= National Intelligence Coordination Committee (Australia) =

Australian Government National Intelligence Coordination Committee

Committee overview
- Formed: 2008
- Headquarters: Department of the Prime Minister and Cabinet
- Committee executive: Nick Warner, Director-General of the Office of National Intelligence
- Parent department: Department of the Prime Minister and Cabinet

The National Intelligence Coordination Committee (NICC) is a peak intergovernmental officials-level body of the Government of Australia responsible for the development and co-ordination of the Australian Intelligence Community in accordance with the National Security Committee of Cabinet. The NICC is chaired by the Director-General of the Office of National Intelligence.

The United Kingdom Joint Intelligence Committee and the United States Office of the Director of National Intelligence have similar but not analogous functions as the NICC.

== History ==
The National Intelligence Coordination Committee can trace its origins back to the Joint Intelligence Committee (JIC) established during the Second World War in 1944 within the Department of Defence. The JIC was chaired by the Controller of Joint Intelligence and responsible for controlling and co-ordinating Defence intelligence policy, the preparation of intelligence reports, and liaison with the Joint Planning Committee of the Department of Defence. The JIC operated concurrently with the Joint Intelligence Bureau (JIB), which was the predecessor to the Joint Intelligence Organisation, following the JIB's establishment in 1947.

In 1969, the JIC was replaced by the National Intelligence Committee (NIC) which was supported by the National Assessments Staff (the predecessor to the Office of National Assessments) within the Joint Intelligence Organisation (the predecessor to the Defence Intelligence Organisation) also established in 1969.

In 1977, the tabled recommendations of the Royal Commission on Intelligence and Security, established on 21 August 1974 by Australia's Prime Minister Gough Whitlam and led by Justice Robert Hope, called for the creation of a national intelligence committee and formation of an independent agency to provide intelligence assessments on political, strategic and economic issues directly to the Prime Minister. As such, Prime Minister Malcolm Fraser established the Office of National Assessments through the Office of National Assessments Act 1977, ensuring the ONA had statutory independence from government. ONA began operations on 20 February 1978, assuming the Joint Intelligence Organisations's National Assessments Staff and foreign intelligence assessment role. The ONA directly supported the NIC.

During the Howard government, the peak officials-level intelligence co-ordination body was the Heads of Intelligence Agencies Meeting (HIAM) chaired by the Director General of the Office of National Assessments. HIAM developed as an informal deliberative and co-ordination body for the heads of the Australian Intelligence Community agencies.

In July 2004, former senior diplomat and Secretary of the Department of Foreign Affairs and Trade Philip Flood who was head of the Inquiry into Australian Intelligence Agencies (also known as the Flood Report) tabled recommendations for the Australian Intelligence Community. Among its findings, the Flood Report recommended that the Office of National Assessments staff be increased to provide improved foreign intelligence co-ordination and evaluation and that the Heads of Intelligence Agencies Meeting be formalised. The ONA then established the Foreign Intelligence Coordination Committee (FICC) with the responsibilities for Australian Intelligence Community co-ordination and capabilities development. The FICC was chaired by the Director General of the Office of National Assessments and was composed of the heads of ASIO, ASIS, DIO, DSD, DIGO and the AFP alongside Deputy Secretary-level representation from the Departments of the Prime Minister and Cabinet, Defence, and Foreign Affairs and Trade.

In 2008, Prime Minister Kevin Rudd revamped the Australian national security framework with the creation of the National Intelligence Coordination Committee which integrated the Foreign Intelligence Coordination Committee and tasked with broader Australian Intelligence Community co-ordination responsibilities. Rudd also created the public service position of National Security Adviser with the rank of Associate Secretary within the Department of the Prime Minister and Cabinet. The National Security Adviser was tasked with Chairing the National Intelligence Coordination Committee alongside a raft of other national security leadership and advice functions. The National Security Adviser was disbanded by Prime Minister Tony Abbott in 2013 and with their roles integrated into the Deputy Secretary of the National Security and International Policy Group within the Department of the Prime Minister and Cabinet.

== Role ==
The National Intelligence Coordination Committee plays a central role in advising National Intelligence Priorities and supporting a coordinated approach by the Australian Intelligence Community according to directions by the National Security Committee of Cabinet and the Secretaries Committee on National Security.

== Membership ==
- Director-General of the Office of National Intelligence (Chair)
- Deputy Secretary (National Security) of the Department of the Prime Minister and Cabinet
- Deputy Secretary (Indo-Pacific) of the Department of Foreign Affairs and Trade
- Deputy Secretary (Strategic Policy and Intelligence) of the Department of Defence
- Deputy Secretary (Intelligence and Capability) of the Department of Home Affairs
- Deputy Secretary (Integrity and International) of the Attorney-General's Department
- Director-General of the Australian Secret Intelligence Service
- Director-General of Security
- Director-General of the Australian Signals Directorate
- Director of the Defence Intelligence Organisation
- Director of the Australian Geospatial-Intelligence Organisation
- Commissioner of the Australian Federal Police
- Commissioner of the Australian Border Force
- Chief Executive Officer of the Australian Criminal Intelligence Commission

Prior to the establishment of the Department of Home Affairs on the 20 December 2017, the Deputy Secretary for National Security of the Attorney-General's Department attended.

== Subcommittees ==
The National Intelligence Coordination Committee is composed of two subcommittees to assist with setting intelligence requirements, evaluating intelligence collection efforts, and developing intelligence capabilities.

The National Intelligence Collection Management Committee (NICMC) is responsible for setting specific requirements and evaluating collection effort against each of the National Intelligence Priorities (NIPs). It is chaired by the Director General of the Office of National Assessments.

The National Intelligence Open Source Committee (NIOSC) is responsible for enhancing the co-ordination and capabilities of the national intelligence community's open source efforts. It is chaired by the Director General of the Office of National Assessments.

== Secretariat ==
The National Security and International Policy Group of the Department of the Prime Minister and Cabinet provides secretariat and support functions to the National Intelligence Coordination Committee and its subcommittees.
