= Office of National Intelligence =

Australian government agency

Office overview
- Formed: 20 December 2018
- Preceding office: Office of National Assessments; DPMC intelligence activities
- Jurisdiction: Australian Government
- Headquarters: Robert Marsden Hope Building, Canberra
- Minister responsible: Anthony Albanese, Prime Minister
- Office executives: Kathy Klugman, Director-General; Nina Davidson, Deputy Director-General; Paul Taloni, Chief Intelligence Scientist
- Parent department: Department of the Prime Minister and Cabinet
- Website: oni.gov.au

The Office of National Intelligence (ONI) is an Australian statutory intelligence agency responsible for advising the prime minister and National Security Committee, the production of all-source intelligence assessments, and the strategic development and enterprise management of the National Intelligence Community. The ONI is directly accountable to the prime minister as a portfolio agency of the Department of the Prime Minister and Cabinet.

ONI is the Australian equivalent of the United States Office of the Director of National Intelligence and the United Kingdom Joint Intelligence Organisation.

== History ==
The origins of ONI stem from recommendations of the Royal Commission on Intelligence and Security (also known as the First Hope Commission) which was established on 21 August 1974 by Australia's Prime Minister Gough Whitlam and led by Justice Robert Hope, for the formation of an independent agency to provide intelligence assessments on political, strategic and economic issues directly to the Prime Minister. The Commission reported in 1977 to the Australian Government led by Malcolm Fraser, and four of its eight reports were tabled in Parliament.

The ONA was established under the Office of National Assessments Act 1977, which ensured ONA's statutory independence from government. ONA began operations on 20 February 1978, assuming the Joint Intelligence Organisation's foreign intelligence assessment role. The Joint Intelligence Organisation retained its defence intelligence assessment role until it was restructured as the Defence Intelligence Organisation in 1990.

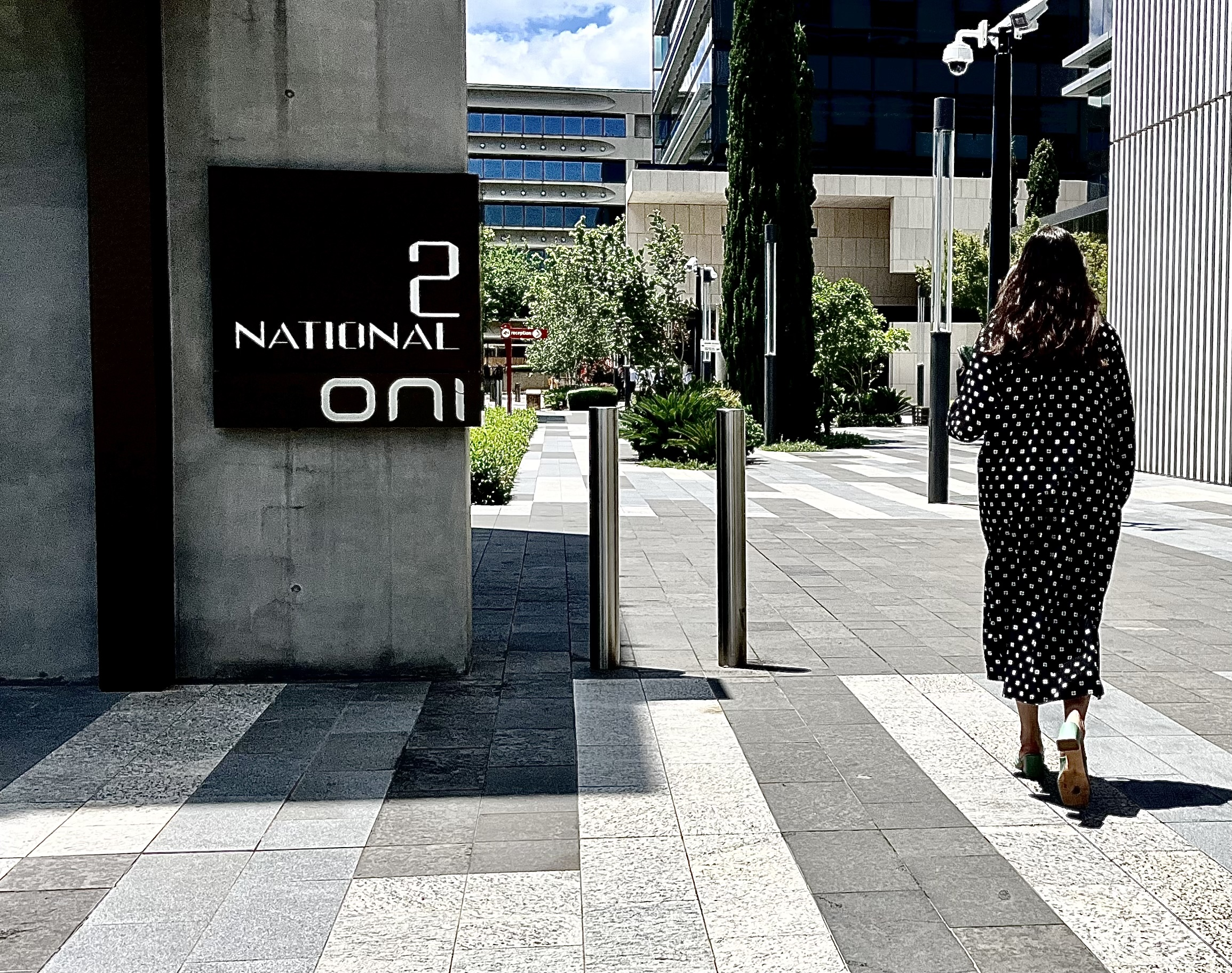
The Office of National Intelligence is based in the Hope Building, on National Circuit in the Australian Capital Territory.

The formation of the Office of National Intelligence was announced by Prime Minister Malcolm Turnbull on the 18 July 2017 in line with recommendations from the 2017 Independent Review of the Australian Intelligence Community led by Michael L'Estrange and Stephen Merchant. The Office of National Intelligence subsumes the Office of National Assessments, with its facilities in the Robert Marsden Hope Building. The expanded role of the agency includes the strategic development and enterprise management of the National Intelligence Community. On the 1 December 2017, Prime Minister Malcolm Turnbull announced Nick Warner, then Director-General of the Australian Secret Intelligence Service and former Secretary of the Department of Defence, to serve as the Director-General of the Office of National Intelligence. ONI was formally stood up on the 20 December 2018.

Following the expiration of Andrew Shearer's term as director-general of the Office of National Intelligence, Kathy Klugman was appointed to the role and thus became the first female occupier of the role in December 2025.

== Role ==
The recommendations of the 2017 Independent Intelligence Review outline that the Office of National Intelligence would serve as the principal advisory agency to the Prime Minister on intelligence matters with new and expanded responsibilities from the Office of National Assessments including:

- convening and chairing the National Intelligence Coordination Committee and a proposed Intelligence Integration Board;
- Proposing the establishment of a National Intelligence Community Science and Technology Advisory Board, National Intelligence Community Innovation Fund, National Intelligence Community Innovation Hub, and Joint Capability Fund;
- producing all-source national assessments and strategic foreign intelligence assessments;
- identifying national intelligence priorities in support of government policy-making;
- overseeing performance evaluations of the Australian Intelligence Community;
- coordinating joint capabilities and shared services across the National Intelligence Community;
- developing an Intelligence Capability Investment Plan for the Forward Estimates period;
- coordinating international intelligence liaison relationships; and
- setting community-wide standards for security, analytic tradecraft and ICT.

== See also ==
- Australian Intelligence Community
- United States Department of State Bureau of Intelligence and Research
- United States Office of the Director of National Intelligence
- New Zealand National Assessments Bureau
- United Kingdom Cabinet Office Joint Intelligence Organisation
