= National Security Committee (Australia) =

National security and major foreign policy body in Australia

Committee overview
- Formed: 1996
- Headquarters: Parliament House, Canberra
- Committee executives: Anthony Albanese, Prime Minister (chair); Richard Marles, Deputy Prime Minister (deputy chair)
- Parent department: Cabinet of Australia

The National Security Committee (NSC), officially known as the National Security Committee of Cabinet, is the paramount decision-making body for national security and major foreign policy (including usage of the Australian Defence Force) matters in the Australian Government. It is a committee of the Cabinet of Australia, though decisions of the NSC do not require the endorsement of the Cabinet itself.

== History ==
The origins of the NSC stem from the 1977 tabled recommendations of the Royal Commission on Intelligence and Security, established on 21 August 1974 by Australia's Prime Minister Gough Whitlam and led by Justice Robert Hope, for the creation of a "ministerial committee on intelligence and security to give general oversight and policy control to the intelligence community".

Prime Minister Malcolm Fraser consequently established the National and International Security Committee in 1977. Prime Minister Bob Hawke also continued the format of the National and International Security Committee as a subcommittee of the Defence and External Relations Committee to consider and report on national security, defence and international relations.

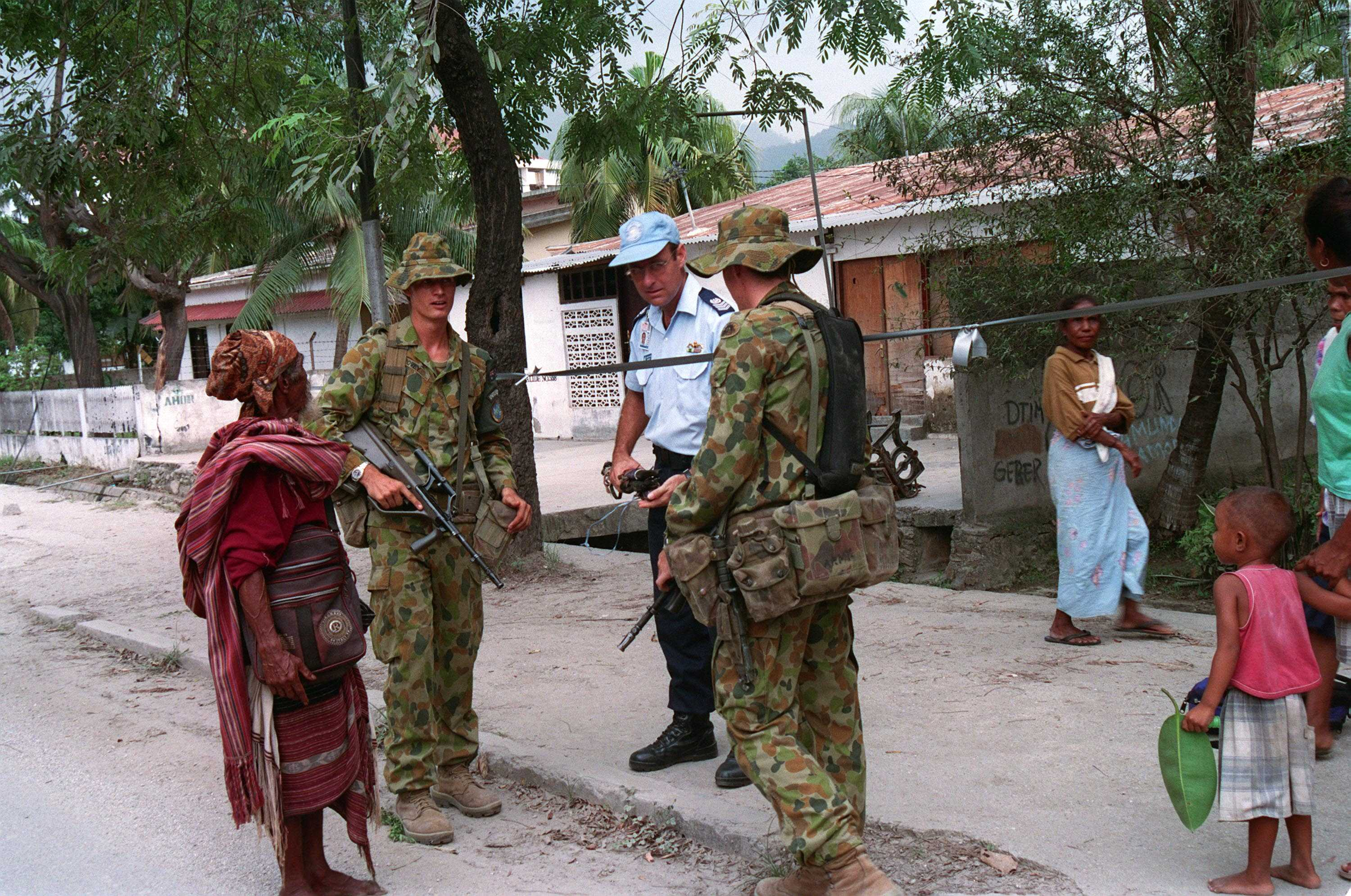
Australian Army and Australian Federal Police personnel of the International Force for East Timor (INTERFET) talk with a citizen in Dili, East Timor in February 2000.

The current format of the National Security Committee was created by Prime Minister John Howard in 1996 with a broad national security mandate including foreign policy and international economic issues. Under Howard the NSC also played a central role in the lead up and during the International Force for East Timor deployment, the formulation of Defence White Papers, and the Australian involvement in the War in Afghanistan and the Iraq War.

In 2008, Prime Minister Kevin Rudd revamped the Australian national security framework with the creation of the intergovernmental officials-level National Intelligence Coordination Committee (NICC) and the public service position of National Security Adviser (NSA) within the Department of the Prime Minister and Cabinet. The National Intelligence Coordination Committee plays a central role in advising national intelligence priorities and supporting a coordinated approach by the National Intelligence Community to directions by the NSC.

The National Security Adviser was created without a statutory footing but was tasked with ranging responsibilities including counterterrorism, emergency management, and defence strategic policy. The role of National Security Adviser was disbanded by Prime Minister Tony Abbott in 2013.

== Role ==
The responsibilities of the National Security Committee include to deliberate and decide on Australia's national security issues, including international security issues of strategic relevance, Australian border security, national responses to domestic and international crises and terrorism, military operations and the deployment of the Australian Defence Force, and the operation and activities of the National Intelligence Community.

The NSC also considers issues of defence acquisition and recommendations from the Department of Defence's Capability Acquisition and Sustainment Group.

Its decisions do not require the endorsement of Cabinet.

=== War powers ===
The Constitution of Australia does not contain a provision that expressly states who is responsible for committing Australia to war. Contemporary practice, is that a decision to commit the Australian Defence Force to an "international armed conflict is an exercise of prerogative power pursuant to section 61 of the Constitution" that is made by the Prime Minister and NSC without involving the Governor-General. The NSC may refer its decision to the full Cabinet for its endorsement. The Commonwealth Government has never been required by the Constitution or legislation to seek parliamentary approval for decisions to deploy military forces overseas or go to war.

=== Biosecurity ===
==== 2020 coronavirus state of emergency ====
The NSC met numerous times in response to the COVID-19 pandemic in Australia, with attendance by the Minister for Health, Greg Hunt, and former Chief Medical Officer, Brendan Murphy, who began Australia's health response to COVID-19.

On 5 March 2020, the Prime Minister, Scott Morrison, announced that the NSC had agreed to new travel restrictions, updated travel advice and implemented new screening measures for COVID-19, aimed to "slow the importation of COVID-19 cases into Australia to enable preparatory measures to continue and to enable a public health response to the initial cases".

On 18 March 2020, a human biosecurity emergency was declared in Australia owing to the risks to human health posed by the coronavirus (COVID-19) pandemic, after the NSC had met the previous day. The Biosecurity Act 2015 specifies that the Governor-General may declare such an emergency exists if the Health Minister (then Greg Hunt) is satisfied that "a listed human disease is posing a severe and immediate threat, or is causing harm, to human health on a nationally significant scale". This gives the Minister sweeping powers, including imposing restrictions or preventing the movement of people and goods between specified places, and evacuations. The Biosecurity (Human Biosecurity Emergency) (Human Coronavirus with Pandemic Potential) Declaration 2020 was declared by the Governor-General, David Hurley, under Section 475 of the Act.

=== Counter-terrorism ===
The NSC receives advice from national security agencies and law enforcement agencies. It met 12 times in the two weeks following the terrorist attack at Bondi Beach on 14 December 2025.

== Ministerial membership ==
The Prime Minister determines the membership of NSC. Under the current Albanese Government, the NSC is chaired by the Prime Minister with the Deputy Prime Minister and Defence Minister as deputy chair. In July 2022, Albanese added Chris Bowen, the Minister for Climate Change to the committee.

Members of the Committee as of June 2025 are:

Image	Office holder	Portfolio
	Anthony Albanese MP	Prime Minister (chair)
	Richard Marles MP	Deputy Prime Minister (deputy chair) Minister for Defence
	Jim Chalmers MP	Treasurer
	Senator Penny Wong	Minister for Foreign Affairs
	Senator Katy Gallagher	Minister for Finance
	Chris Bowen MP	Minister for Climate Change and Energy
	Tony Burke MP	Minister for Home Affairs, Minister for Immigration and Citizenship, Minister for Cyber Security
	Michelle Rowland MP	Attorney-General
	Pat Conroy MP	Minister for Defence Industry Minister for Pacific Island Affairs

Formerly under the Turnbull government, the ministerial Cabinet Secretary was also a member.

== Other attendees ==
As the peak decision-making body on national security, the NSC is also attended and advised by the Secretaries for each respective public service department represented by a Minister on the NSC. As such, NSC attendance also includes the Department of the Prime Minister and Cabinet, the Department of Defence, the Department of Foreign Affairs and Trade, the Department of the Treasury, and the Department of Home Affairs.

The Chief of the Defence Force and other senior ADF officers also attend if requested or required by the NSC.

Other government ministers, such as the Minister for Trade, Tourism and Investment, are invited to attend meetings as required. The Leader of the Opposition is also sometimes invited to attend for important briefings.

As mentioned above, the NSC met numerous times during the 2020 coronavirus pandemic with attendance by the Minister for Health and the Chief Medical Officer.

== Secretaries Committee on National Security ==
The Secretaries Committee on National Security (SCNS) (formerly the Secretaries Committee on Intelligence and Security) serves as the peak officials-level committee considering national security matters and directly supports the NSC. It is an interdepartmental committee which considers all major matters to be put before the NSC and supports the whole-of-government coordination of national security policy.

The SCNS membership is composed of the secretaries for each respective public service department represented by a Minister on the NSC as well as the heads of Australian Intelligence Community agencies and other national security related agencies.

- Secretary of the Department of the Prime Minister and Cabinet
- Secretary of the Department of Defence
- Secretary of the Department of Foreign Affairs and Trade
- Secretary of the Department of the Treasury
- Secretary of the Department of Home Affairs
- Director-General of the Office of National Intelligence
- Director-General of Security
- Director-General of the Australian Secret Intelligence Service
- Director of the Defence Intelligence Organisation
- Director of the Australian Geospatial-Intelligence Organisation
- Director of the Australian Signals Directorate
- Chief of the Defence Force
- Commissioner of the Australian Federal Police
- Commissioner of the Australian Border Force
- Chief Executive Officer of the Australian Criminal Intelligence Commission

== Secretariat ==
The National Security and International Policy Group of the Department of the Prime Minister and Cabinet provides secretariat support functions for the NSC and SCNS.

== See also ==
- National Intelligence Community
- National Cabinet of Australia
- National COVID-19 Coordination Commission Advisory Board
- National Intelligence Coordination Committee
- United Kingdom National Security Council
- United States National Security Council
