= Office of National Assessments =

Australian former intelligence agency

Agency overview
- Formed: 19 October 1977
- Jurisdiction: Commonwealth of Australia
- Headquarters: Robert Marsden Hope Building, Canberra, Australian Capital Territory, Australia
- Employees: 138 (2015)
- Annual budget: $54.7 million (2015)
- Minister responsible: Anthony Albanese MP, Prime Minister
- Agency executive: Nick Warner, Director-General
- Parent agency: Department of the Prime Minister and Cabinet
- Website: ona.gov.au

The Office of National Assessments (ONA) was an Australian statutory intelligence agency established by the Office of National Assessments Act 1977 as an independent statutory body directly accountable to the Prime Minister of Australia as a portfolio agency of the Department of the Prime Minister and Cabinet. ONA provided all-source assessments on international political, strategic and economic developments to the Prime Minister and the National Security Committee of Cabinet. ONA also played a coordination role in the Australian Intelligence Community through evaluating foreign intelligence products, convening the National Intelligence Coordination Committee, and developing relationships with intelligence agencies around the world.

ONA was regarded as the Australian equivalent of the United Kingdom Joint Intelligence Organisation, a combination of the United States Office of the Director of National Intelligence and United States Department of State Bureau of Intelligence and Research, and the New Zealand National Assessments Bureau.

On 18 July 2017, Prime Minister Malcolm Turnbull announced the creation of the Office of National Intelligence in line with recommendations from the 2017 Independent Review of the Australian Intelligence Community led by Michael L'Estrange and Stephen Merchant. ONI was formally stood up on 20 December 2018.

== History ==
The origins of ONA stem from recommendations of the Royal Commission on Intelligence and Security (also known as the First Hope Commission) which was established on 21 August 1974 by Australia's Prime Minister Gough Whitlam and led by Justice Robert Hope, for the formation of an independent agency to provide intelligence assessments on political, strategic and economic issues directly to the Prime Minister. The Commission reported in 1977 to the Australian Government led by Malcolm Fraser, and four of its eight reports were tabled in Parliament.

The ONA was established under the Office of National Assessments Act 1977, which ensured ONA's statutory independence from government. ONA began operations on 20 February 1978, assuming the Joint Intelligence Organisation's foreign intelligence assessment role. The Joint Intelligence Organisation retained its defence intelligence assessment role until it was restructured as the Defence Intelligence Organisation in 1990.

The formation of the Office of National Intelligence was announced by Prime Minister Malcolm Turnbull on 18 July 2017 in line with recommendations from the 2017 Independent Review of the Australian Intelligence Community led by Michael L'Estrange and Stephen Merchant. The Office of National Intelligence subsumes the Office of National Assessments with an expended role in the strategic development and enterprise management of the National Intelligence Community. On 1 December 2017, Prime Minister Malcolm Turnbull announced Nick Warner, then Director-General of the Australian Secret Intelligence Service and former Secretary of the Department of Defence, to serve as the Director-General of the Office of National Intelligence. ONI was formally stood up on 20 December 2018.

=== Media reporting ===
Although not a secret organisation, ONA usually attracts little attention. However, a striking exception occurred in 2001 when Prime Minister John Howard publicly relied upon an ONA assessment to support his claims about asylum seekers on the MV Tampa, in an incident which became known as the "Tampa affair". The ONA assessment was later leaked to the public in its entirety, showing that the assessment was ultimately based on nothing more than press releases from various government ministers.

In 2003, in the lead-up to the 2003 invasion of Iraq, an ONA intelligence officer named Andrew Wilkie resigned from the agency, citing ethical concerns in relation to selective and exaggerated use of intelligence by the Australian Government on the matter of Iraq and weapons of mass destruction.

=== Flood Report ===
ONA has experienced substantial growth since the release of the report into intelligence agencies by Philip Flood which recommended a doubling of the agency's budget and staffing resources and formalisation of the agency's role as a coordinator and evaluator of the other Australian foreign intelligence agencies. The only ONA specific recommendation not implemented from the Flood report was the renaming of ONA to the Australian Foreign Intelligence Assessment Agency (AFIAA).

== Role and responsibilities ==
ONA is an all-source intelligence assessment agency which reports directly to the Prime Minister. ONA provides assessments on international political, strategic and economic developments and analyses intelligence products of the Australian Intelligence Community. ONA plays a leadership role in the Australian Intelligence Community through coordination and evaluation of Australia's foreign intelligence activities. ONA also collects and analyses open-source intelligence.

Ultimately the ONA assessments are designed to assist the Australian Government in strategic decision making and ensure that government is fully briefed on international developments and emerging threats both in the Indo-Pacific region and around world.

== Organisational structure ==
The ONA is divided into analytic branches covering geographic or thematic areas including:

=== Enterprise Management Group ===
The Enterprise Management Group is led by a Deputy Director-General is responsible for interagency and intergovernmental intelligence coordination, integration and engagement functions and the governance and capability development of the Australian Intelligence Community.

==== Coordination ====
The Executive and Foreign Intelligence Coordination Branch (EFIC) supports the coordination of matters of common interest across the Australian Intelligence Community (AIC), in areas such as cross-agency policy, long-term planning and the setting of Australia's foreign intelligence requirements based on the National Intelligence Priorities. EFIC also runs an active foreign relationship program and manages ONA's Cabinet liaison functions. EFIC supports the Department of the Prime Minister and Cabinet and the National Intelligence Coordination Committee.

==== Washington Liaison ====
The ONA Liaison Officer Washington works within the Embassy of Australia, Washington, D.C. and liaises with and develops relationships with the United States Intelligence Community.

==== London Liaison ====
The ONA Liaison Officer London works within the High Commission of Australia, London and liaises with and develops relationships with the United Kingdom Intelligence Community.

=== Assessments Group ===
The Assessments Group is led by a Deputy Director-General and is made up of 2 assessments divisions.

==== North Asia ====
The North Asia Branch monitors and forecasts political, security, social, and economic developments, issues and trends in East Asia (including China, Japan, and the Korean peninsula) and analyses and assesses all-source intelligence products on North Asia from the Australian Intelligence Community.

==== Oceania ====
The Oceania Branch monitors and forecasts political, security, social, and economic developments, issues and trends in Oceania (including Fiji, Papua New Guinea, and the Solomon Islands), and analyses and assesses all-source intelligence products on Oceania from the Australian Intelligence Community.

==== Open Source Centre ====
The Open Source Centre collects, analyses and researches open-source intelligence to support Australian Government intelligence priorities and the work of the Australian Intelligence Community, with a focus on international developments that affect Australia's national interests.

==== Strategic Analysis ====
The Strategic Analysis Branch monitors and forecasts strategic, military and security developments around the world including military-political affairs, science and technology, cybersecurity, space, weapons of mass destruction, global health, and climate change. The Strategic Analysis Branch works also collaborates with the Defence Intelligence Organisation.

==== International Economy ====
The International Economy Branch monitors and forecasts international economic, financial, and trade developments, issues and trends around the world. The International Economy Branch works with the Department of the Treasury.

==== Transnational Issues ====
The Transnational Issues Branch monitors and forecasts transnational issues such as terrorism, illegal drug trade, people smuggling, transnational crime, and human security around the world as well as political, economic, social and strategic developments in Africa and the Americas.

==== South East Asia ====
The South East Asia Branch monitors and forecasts political, security, social, and economic developments, issues and trends in Southeast Asia (including Indonesia, Malaysia, Thailand, and the Philippines), and analyses and assesses all-source intelligence products on South East Asia from the Australian Intelligence Community.

==== South Asia and Middle East ====
The South Asia and Middle East Branch monitors and forecasts political, security, social, and economic developments, issues and trends in South Asia (including India, Pakistan, and Afghanistan) and the Middle East (including Iran, Iraq, Syria, Israel, and Saudi Arabia) and analyses and assesses all-source intelligence products on South Asia and Middle East from the Australian Intelligence Community.

=== Chief Operating Officer Division ===
The Chief Operating Officer Division provides support for human resources, internal security, facilities management, business management, information technology, information management, report production, and administration.

== Directors-General ==
The Director-General of ONA is an independent statutory officer who is not subject to external direction on the content of ONA assessments. ONA has about 150 staff, including 100 analysts. The previous Director-General of ONA was Richard Maude, who was appointed to a five-year term at the agency in April 2013. Maude took leave from ONA in 2017 to prepare the White Paper on Foreign Policy, with Bruce Miller acting in the role. In December 2017, former ASIS director-general Nick Warner was appointed.

- Robert Furlonger (1977–1981)
- Michael Cook (1981–1989)
- Geoff Miller (1989–1995)
- Philip Flood (1995–1996)
- Richard Smith (1996–1998)
- Kim Jones (1998–2003)
- Peter Varghese (2004–2009)
- Allan Gyngell (2009–2013)
- Richard Maude (2013–2017)
- Bruce Miller (acting 2017)
- Nick Warner (2017–present)

== Headquarters ==
In October 2011, ONA moved into the Robert Marsden Hope Building, a refurbished building in the Parliamentary Triangle. The building is named for Justice Hope, who led two Royal Commissions into Australia's intelligence and security agencies and operations, the first of which led to the creation of ONA. Before its move, ONA had been a sub-tenant in the Central Office building of the Australian Security Intelligence Organisation (ASIO) in Russell, Canberra.

== See also ==
- Australian Intelligence Community
- United States Department of State Bureau of Intelligence and Research
- United States Office of the Director of National Intelligence
- New Zealand National Assessments Bureau
- Cabinet Office United Kingdom Joint Intelligence Organisation
