= Joint Intelligence Organisation (Australia) =

The Joint Intelligence Organisation (JIO) was an Australian government intelligence agency that existed between 1969 and 1990 and which was responsible for the analysis of defence and foreign intelligence.

The JIO was staffed by civilian officers of the Department of Defence, foreign service officers of the Department of Foreign Affairs and Trade, and service personnel from the Australian Army, the Royal Australian Navy, and the Royal Australian Air Force. The JIO also maintained the National Assessments Staff (NAS) which supported the National Intelligence Committee (the predecessor to the National Intelligence Coordination Committee) until 1977 when it was assumed by the Office of National Assessments. The NAS was responsible for preparing long–range analytical assessments of international issues.

The foreign intelligence assessment functions of JIO were assumed by the Office of National Assessments (ONA) in 1977 and the JIO was fully replaced by the Defence Intelligence Organisation (DIO) in 1990.

== History ==
Following World War II, defence and foreign intelligence functions were shared between the Royal Australian Navy, the Australian Army and the Royal Australian Air Force. There also existed a Joint Intelligence Bureau (JIB) within the Department of Defence responsible for geographic, infrastructure, economic, scientific and technical intelligence in the Asia-Pacific region.

In 1969, the foreign intelligence functions of the individual armed services were merged into the JIB and the Joint Intelligence Organisation (JIO) was formed. The existence of JIO was initially a secret, but was revealed by Prime Minister William McMahon when he blurted out something about "J-ten".

The 1977 tabled recommendations of the Royal Commission on Intelligence and Security, established on 21 August 1974 by Prime Minister Gough Whitlam and led by Justice Robert Hope, called for an independent authority to provide intelligence assessments on political, strategic and economic issues directly to the Prime Minister.

As such, Prime Minister Malcolm Fraser established the Office of National Assessments (ONA) through the Office of National Assessments Act 1977. ONA assumed the National Assessments Staff and foreign intelligence assessments capabilities of JIO.

Following the formation of the ONA in 1977 to handle assessment of foreign intelligence, the JIO was changed to focus on intelligence relating solely to defence matters. Following a review of intelligence structures, the JIO became the Defence Intelligence Organisation in 1990 as the Department of Defence's strategic, technical, and all-source intelligence assessment agency.

== See also ==
- Defence Strategic Policy and Intelligence Group
- Australian Intelligence Community
- Defence Intelligence Organisation
