= Andrew Shearer =

Andrew Shearer may refer to:

- Andrew N. Shearer (born 1977), underground film-maker, journalist and punk rock musician
- Andrew Shearer (lumber merchant) (1864–1944), Canadian lumber merchant and amateur ice hockey player
- Andrew Shearer (astrophysicist) (born 1953), astrophysicist and observer of pulsars and neutron stars
- Andrew Shearer (public servant), Australian government official and former diplomat
