= Defence Strategic Policy and Intelligence Group =

Group of the Australian Department of Defence

The Defence Strategic Policy and Intelligence Group (SP&I) of the Australian Government Department of Defence is responsible for defence diplomacy, strategic policy, international security, and military intelligence co-ordination and advice to the Prime Minister of Australia, Minister for Defence, Secretary of the Department of Defence, and Chief of the Defence Force. The Defence Strategic Policy and Intelligence Group is led by the Deputy Secretary for Strategic Policy and Intelligence and comprises three policy divisions and two intelligence agencies.

The Group has existed in various forms since the Cold War within the Department of Defence with responsibilities for defence policy, strategy, intelligence, and international policy. It has been known as the Defence Strategy and Intelligence Group, the Defence Strategy Executive, the Defence Intelligence and Security Group, the Defence Intelligence, Security and International Policy Group, and the Defence Intelligence Group. The current SP&I Group was established on 8 February 2016 as a key recommendation of the First Principles Review of the Australian Defence Organisation, integrating all policy, strategy and intelligence functions of the Australian Government Department of Defence.

The Deputy Secretary for Strategic Policy and Intelligence can be seen as the Australian combined equivalent of the Under Secretary of Defense for Intelligence and the Under Secretary of Defense for Policy of the United States Department of Defense.

== Deputy Secretaries ==
The current position of Deputy Secretary Strategic Policy and Intelligence traces its origins back to the position of Deputy Secretary "B", the principal policy official within the Department of Defence. Under the tenure of Secretary of Defence Arthur Tange from 1970 to 1979, the position of Deputy Secretary "B" was responsible for force development and analysis, strategic and international policy, and intelligence and security. The inaugural Deputy Secretary "B" was Gordon Blakers from 1966 to 1978, followed by William Pritchett from 1978 to 1979, George Cawsey from 1979 to 1981, Alan Wrigley from 1982 to 1985, and John M. Moten from 1985 to 1988.

Deputy Secretary "B" was changed to Deputy Secretary Strategy in 1998 with the tenure of Paul Dibb from 1988 to 1991, followed by Allan Hawke from 1991 to 1993, Ric Smith from 1994 to 1995, and Hugh White from 1995 to 2000. White also served as Deputy Secretary for the White Paper in 2000. Richard Brabin-Smith was the Deputy Secretary Strategy in 2000 then Deputy Secretary Strategic Policy from 2001 to 2002.

In 1999 Martin Brady was appointed Chairman Defence Intelligence Broad, a new entity to oversee the three defence intelligence agencies which was then transformed into Deputy Secretary Intelligence and Security from 2001 to 2002 held by Shane Carmody. Shane Carmody also served as the Deputy Secretary Strategic Policy from 2003 to 2006 whilst Ron Bonighton served as Deputy Secretary Intelligence and Security from 2002 to 2005, with Shane Carmody concurrently serving as Deputy Secretary Intelligence and Security and Deputy Secretary Strategy from 2005 to 2006. From 2006, Stephen Merchant was Deputy Secretary Intelligence and Security until 2011 alongside Mike Pezzullo as Deputy Secretary Strategy, Governance and Coordination until 2009. Peter Jennings was Deputy Secretary Strategy from 2009 to 2012, whilst Steve Meekin was Deputy Secretary Intelligence and Security from 2012 to 2016 and Peter Baxter as Deputy Secretary Strategy from 2013 to 2016.

Following the First Principles Review of Defence, Peter Baxter became the first Deputy Secretary Strategic Policy and Intelligence in 2016 and was succeeded by Rebecca Skinner later that year. The current Deputy Secretary Strategic Policy and Intelligence is Hugh Jeffery, succeeding Rebecca Skinner in August 2018

== Intelligence Agencies ==
The Defence Strategic Policy and Intelligence Group also coordinates the policy parameters of the two Australian military intelligence agencies, staffed by civilian and Australian Defence Force personnel, of the Australian Intelligence Community.

=== Defence Intelligence Organisation ===
The Defence Intelligence Organisation (DIO) is the national military intelligence and intelligence assessment agency that provides services and advice at the national security level with the mandate to support the Australian Defence Force, Department of Defence and the Australian Government and national security decision-making and to assist with the planning and conduct of Australian Defence Force operations.

=== Australian Geospatial-Intelligence Organisation ===
The Australian Geospatial-Intelligence Organisation (AGO) was established by amalgamating the Australian Imagery Organisation, the Directorate of Strategic Military Geographic Information, and the Defence Topographic Agency to provide geospatial intelligence, from imagery and other sources, in support of the Australian Defence Force and national security interests.

== Policy Divisions ==
The Defence Strategic Policy and Intelligence Group also combines the strategic, international, and industry policy functions of the Australian Government Department of Defence.

=== Strategic Policy Division ===
The Strategic Policy Division develops policy, military strategy and strategic planning and advice for the Australian Government, senior Defence leaders and other government agencies on the strategic implications of defence and national security matters. The Division comprises 5 branches.

==== Military Strategy Branch ====
The Military Strategy Branch implements strategic policy and provides the necessary strategic guidance including shaping and influencing, strategic reviews and papers, deliberate planning guidance for operations, strategic war gaming and the production of products that direct the deployment, employment and development of the ADF, including capability, through military strategies, future warfare concepts, strategic doctrine and military strategic policy.

==== Strategic Policy Branch ====
The Strategic Policy Branch develops high-level strategic policy guidance for ADF capability development, ADF readiness and Australia's international defence interests; and develops high-level strategic guidance documents, such as the Defence Planning Guidance and Defence Updates.

=== International Policy Division ===
The International Policy Division provides strategic-level foreign policy advice to the Australian Government on the central issues of Australia's defence policy with a focus on the Asia-Pacific region, including international defence relations and Australian Defence Force operations overseas. The Division comprises 4 branches and numerous overseas postings.

==== South and South-East Asia Branch ====
The South and South-East Asia Branch provides policy guidance on Australia's defence interests in South Asia and South East Asia, and manages bilateral defence relationships within the region and engagement with ASEAN. The Branch also manages international engagement on counter-terrorism and multilateral regional issues.

==== Global Interests Branch ====
The Global Interests Branch provides policy guidance on Australia's defence interests, peacekeeping operations, and relationships with Afghanistan, countries in the Middle East including Israel, African countries, Canada, European countries, and multilateral institutions such as the European Union, the North Atlantic Treaty Organization, and the United Nations.

==== Major Powers Branch ====
The Major Powers Branch provides policy guidance on Australia's interests with the United States of America and in North Asia and bilateral defence relationships with the United States of America through the US Alliance Policy Section, and Japan, the Republic of Korea, and the People's Republic of China. The Branch also provides policy guidance on joint facilities and technical programs, such as the Pine Gap defence facility with the United States.

==== Pacific and Timor-Leste Branch ====
The Pacific and Timor-Leste Branch provides policy advice on the implications of developments in the Pacific for Australia's security interests, and manages bilateral defence relationships with Pacific Island countries as well as engagement with the Pacific Islands Forum and the management of the Defence Cooperation Program in the Pacific, including the Pacific Boat Program.

==== Directorate of International Training and Visits ====
The Directorate of International Training and Visits provides protocol advice and logistical support regarding high-profile visits by foreign officials to Australia and by Australian officials overseas as well as international training coordination. Some responsibilities were previously managed by the Defence Cooperation Liaison Office which provided policy advice and liaison with the Australian Defence Force's defence co-operation program involving the Defence Cooperation Scholarship Program, the Pacific Patrol Boat Program, and other initiatives.

==== Directorate of Planning, Innovation and Assessment ====
The Directorate of Planning, Innovation and Assessment is responsible for strategic planning, performance assessment, and innovation development across the International Policy Division.

==== Directorate of Attaché and Overseas Management ====
The Australian Government Department of Defence maintains military attachés and Australian Defence Force staff officers to develop Australia's international defence relationships, usually co-located with the Department of Foreign Affairs and Trade diplomatic missions around the world. In Commonwealth of Nations countries, Australian defence officers posted to Australian High Commissions are titled as Defence Advisers. Otherwise, for all other Australian diplomatic missions, defence officers are titled Defence Attachés. Defence Attachés/Advisers are usually of the rank of Colonel or Lieutenant Colonel (or naval and air equivalents). Uniquely, the Australian Defence Organisation maintains major staffs in Indonesia, the United Kingdom, and the United States. Each Defence Staff is composed of permanent attachés/advisers from the Australian Army, Royal Australian Navy, and Royal Australian Air Force.

===== Defence Staff, Washington =====
The Australian Defence Staff in Washington DC is led by a two-star rank officer and works to build relationships with the United States and promote Australian defence and security interests. It is composed of attaches from each service of the Australian Defence Force. The Royal Australian Navy Naval Attaché serves as the Chief of Navy's representative in North America and provides maritime force advice. The Australian Army Military Attaché serves as the Chief of Army's representative in North America and provides land force advice. The Royal Australian Air Force Air Attaché serves as the Chief of Air Force's representative in North America and provides airpower and aerospace force advice. The Staff is also composed of the Defence Policy Counsellor responsible for international and strategic policy and intelligence functions, the Defence Science Counsellor serving as the Chief Defence Scientist's representative in North America and providing research and development advice, and the Defence Materiel Counsellor serving as the Capability Acquisition and Sustainment Group's representative and providing acquisition advice.

There is also a Defence Liaison at the Australia Consulate-General in Honolulu, Hawaii, responsible for managing relations with the United States Pacific Command.

===== Defence Staff, London =====
The Australian Defence Staff in London is led by a one-star rank officer. It is composed of advisers from each service of the Australian Defence Force. The Royal Australian Navy Naval Adviser is responsible for managing all RAN personnel in the UK, maritime force advice, and liaison with the Royal Navy. The Australian Army Adviser is responsible for military advice, liaison with the British Army, and is the Formation Commander for all Australian Army personnel serving in the UK. The Royal Australian Air Force Adviser is responsible for managing all RAAF personnel in the UK, aerospace force advice, and liaison with the Royal Air Force. The Assistant Defence Adviser for Strategy is responsible for liaison with the Ministry of Defence, strategic interests, and the development of Australia–United Kingdom relations. The Assistant Defence Adviser for Joint Capability and Support is responsible for capability acquisition and joint development. The Defence Science Counsellor is the Chief Defence Scientist's representative and is responsible for liaising and advising on science and technology. The Defence Materiel Counsellor represents the Capability Acquisition and Sustainment Group and works on procurement and defence industry.

===== Defence Staff, Jakarta =====
The Australian Defence Staff in Jakarta is led by a one-star rank officer. It is composed of attaches from each service of the Australian Defence Force. The Royal Australian Navy Naval Attaché provides maritime force advice. The Australian Army Attaché provides land force advice. The Royal Australian Air Force Air Force Attaché provides airpower and aerospace force advice.

===== Multilateral Relations =====
For multilateral relations, there are Australian defence officers at the African Union (Defence Attache), the North Atlantic Treaty Organization and the European Union (Defence Attache), and the United Nations in New York (Military Adviser).

===== Bilateral Relations =====
For bilateral relations, there are Australian defence officers in Cambodia (Defence Attaché), Canada (Defence Adviser), the People's Republic of China (Defence Attaché), East Timor (Defence Attaché), Fiji (Defence Adviser, also to Kiribati, Nauru, Samoa, Tonga, and Tuvalu), France (Defence Attaché), Germany (Defence Attaché), India (Defence Adviser, also to South Africa), Indonesia (Australian Defence Staff), Iraq (Defence Attaché), Japan (Defence Attaché), the Republic of Korea (Defence Attaché), Malaysia (Defence Adviser), New Zealand (Defence Adviser, also to the Cook Islands), Pakistan (Defence Adviser), Papua New Guinea (Defence Adviser), Philippines (Defence Attaché), Saudi Arabia (Defence Attaché also to Bahrain, Oman, Kuwait, and Jordan), Singapore (Defence Adviser, also to Brunei), Solomon Islands (Defence Adviser, also to Vanuatu, Palau, the Federated States of Micronesia and the Republic of Marshall Islands), in Madrid for Southern Europe (Defence Attaché), Thailand (Defence Attaché, also to Myanmar), the United Arab Emirates (Defence Attaché, also to Qatar), the United Kingdom (the Australian Defence Staff, also to Ireland), in Washington DC for United States of America (the Australian Defence Staff), and Vietnam (Defence Attaché, also to Laos).

=== Defence Industry Policy Division ===
The Defence Industry Policy Division has responsibility for the implementation of defence industry policy, engagement and innovation as well as Australian export controls.

==== Defence Industry Branch ====
The Defence Industry Branch is responsible for Defence industry policy and industry capability development.

==== Defence Export Controls Branch ====
The Defence Export Controls Branch is responsible for administering controls on the export of defence and strategic goods and technologies and the granting of authorisations to export, in the form of permits and licenses. The Branch also contributes to Australia's international efforts to prevent the proliferation of weapons of mass destruction through participation in multilateral non-proliferation and export control regimes.

==== Defence Capability and Innovation Branch ====
The Defence Capability and Innovation Branch is responsible for managing a consolidated portfolio of innovation investment under the Defence Innovation Hub.

== See also ==
- Australian Intelligence Community
- Australian Army Intelligence Corps
- Australian Special Operations Command
- Australian Secret Intelligence Service
- Australian Security Intelligence Organisation
- Office of National Assessments
- Central Intelligence Agency
- National Security Agency
- National Geospatial-Intelligence Agency
- National Reconnaissance Office
- Under Secretary of State for Arms Control and International Security Affairs
- Bureau of Political-Military Affairs
- Defense Attaché System
