= Russell Offices =

Headquarters of the ADF and Department of Defence in Canberra, Australia

Coordinates: 35°17′51″S 149°9′6″E

- Canberra, Australia
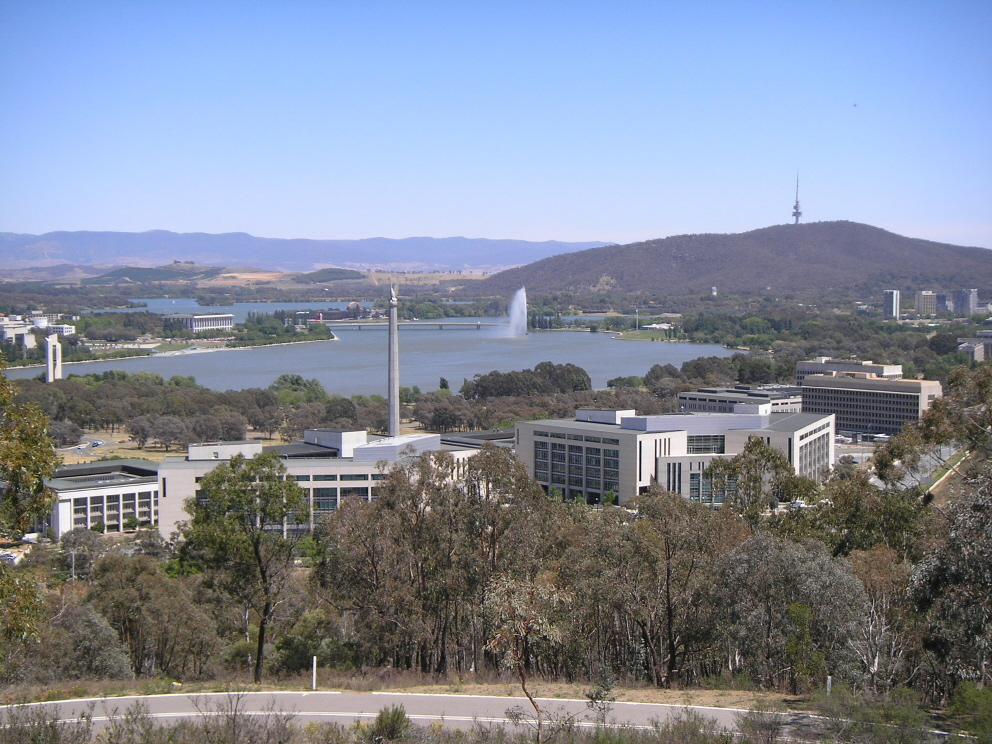
- The Russell Offices photographed from Mount Pleasant

Site information
- Type: Government offices
- Owner: Australian Government
- Controlled by: Australian Department of Defence and the National Capital Authority
- Open to the public: No

Site history
- Built: 1960–1990
- In use: Administrative offices

Garrison information
- Garrison: Australian Defence Organisation
- Occupants: Offices of the Australian Department of Defence and the Australian Defence Force

The Russell Offices, also referred to as Russell or RO, is a complex of office buildings located in Russell, a suburb of Canberra, Australia, constituting the seat of the Department of Defence and part of the administrative headquarters of the Australian Defence Force. The land area of the Russell Offices is managed and secured by the National Capital Authority.

Together with Campbell Park, these two government complexes house the offices of the Department of Defence and contain the administrative headquarters of the Royal Australian Air Force, Royal Australian Navy and the Australian Army. As well as other strategic, military and defence departments including those of the Australian Intelligence Community. The buildings in the complex are informally referred to as R1, R2 and so forth. R1–R4 are located together in the centre of the Russell complex, R5–R7 are located to the north, while R8 and R9 are together at the south.

The Australian Security Intelligence Organisation (ASIO) was located at Russell until their move into the Ben Chifley Building in July 2013.

The Australian Signals Directorate (ASD) occupies Building 5 (R5) and Building 6 (R6) and their annexe. Upgrade works costing an estimated $75M were put to the Parliamentary Standing Committee on Public Works in March 2017. The project is in the Department of Defence budget.

The Australian Geospatial-Intelligence Organisation (AGO) is located in Building 4 (R4).

Security for the Russell Offices Complex is administered by the Australian Federal Police. However, ADF Military Police and the ACT Police occasionally provide security for the area.

== See also ==
- Australian–American Memorial
