= Australian intelligence community =

Security agencies of the Australian Government

Australian Secret Intelligence Service

Australian Signals Directorate

The Australian intelligence community (AIC) and the National Intelligence Community (NIC) or National Security Community of the Australian Government are the collectives of statutory intelligence agencies, policy departments, and other government agencies concerned with protecting and advancing the national security and national interests of the Commonwealth of Australia. The intelligence and security agencies of the Australian Government have evolved since the Second World War and the Cold War and saw transformation and expansion during the global war on terrorism with military deployments in Afghanistan, Iraq and against ISIS in Syria. Key international and national security issues for the Australian Intelligence Community include terrorism and violent extremism, cybersecurity, transnational crime, the rise of China, and Pacific regional security.

The National Security Committee of Cabinet (NSC) is a Cabinet committee and the peak Australian Government decision-making body for national security, intelligence, foreign policy, and defence matters. It is chaired by the Prime Minister and is composed of the Deputy Prime Minister, Attorney-General, Treasurer, Minister for Foreign Affairs, Minister for Defence, and Minister for Home Affairs.

== History ==
Early intelligence gathering efforts in Australia were on an ad hoc basis. Wilson Le Couteur, who has been described as "Australia's first civilian spy", was commissioned by the Barton government to conduct a covert mission in the New Hebrides in 1901, spending three months investigating French activities in the islands. In the lead-up to World War I there were several "spy scares" involving rumours of Japanese agents operating in Queensland, leading to an increase in counter-intelligence activities by military intelligence and state police forces.

In January 1916, the British government established an Australian branch of the Imperial Counter Espionage Bureau, known as the Australian Special Intelligence Bureau (SIB). In 1919 the Commonwealth Police Force and the Special Intelligence Bureau merged to form the Investigation Branch (IB).

During World War II, the Commonwealth Security Service was established.

In 1946, the Commonwealth Investigation Service (CIS) took over security intelligence functions. In 1949 Australian Security Intelligence Organisation (ASIO) was established.

In the late 1940s the Australian Government established a foreign intelligence organisation in the Department of Defence. In 1952 it became the Australian Secret Service, renamed as the Australian Secret Intelligence Service in 1954.

In 1947 a permanent signals intelligence agency in the Department of Defence was established, called the Defence Signals Bureau. It changed its name to the Defence Signals Branch in 1949, the Defence Signals Division in 1964, the Defence Signals Directorate in 1978, and the Australian Signals Directorate (ASD) in 2013.

In 1947 the Department of Defence established the Joint Intelligence Bureau (JIB) which was renamed the Joint Intelligence Organisation (JIO) in 1969 and then the Defence Intelligence Organisation (DIO) in 1989.

In 1977 an additional intelligence analysis agency, the Office of National Assessments (ONA), was created in the Department of the Prime Minister and Cabinet. It was renamed the Office of National Intelligence (ONI) in 2018.

== Overview ==
The Australian government's National Security Strategy includes six core intelligence agencies in the Australian Intelligence Community (AIC), and defines the National Intelligence Community (NIC) as comprising policy departments and other government agencies. The Office of National Intelligence further classifies the six AIC agencies as collection or assessment agencies, and plays a unique all-source intelligence assessment and intergovernmental co-ordination role.

=== Australian Intelligence Community ===
Agency	Department	Role
Office of National Intelligence (ONI)	Department of the Prime Minister and Cabinet	Assessment and Coordination
Australian Security Intelligence Organisation (ASIO)	Department of Home Affairs	Collection and Assessment
Australian Secret Intelligence Service (ASIS)	Department of Foreign Affairs and Trade	Foreign Intelligence Collection
Defence Intelligence Organisation (DIO)	Department of Defence	Assessment
Australian Signals Directorate (ASD)	Department of Defence	Foreign Intelligence Collection
Australian Geospatial-Intelligence Organisation (AGO)	Department of Defence	Foreign Intelligence Collection

=== National Intelligence Community ===
Agency	Department	Role
Australian Federal Police	Department of Home Affairs	Collection
Australian Criminal Intelligence Commission	Department of Home Affairs	Collection and Assessment
Australian Transaction Reports and Analysis Centre	Department of Home Affairs	Collection and Assessment
Australian Border Force	Department of Home Affairs	All Source

== Roles and threats ==
The Australian Government 2008 National Security Strategy defined the Australian Intelligence Community (AIC) as the six core intelligence agencies (Office of National Assessments (ONA), Australian Security Intelligence Organisation (ASIO), Australian Secret Intelligence Service (ASIS), Defence Intelligence Organisation (DIO), Australian Signals Directorate (ASD), Australian Geospatial-Intelligence Organisation (AGO)) and the National Intelligence Community (NIC) as policy departments and other government agencies such as the Department of the Prime Minister and Cabinet and the Australian Federal Police. The Office of National Assessments further classifies the six agencies of the Australian Intelligence Community as collection (ASIO, ASIS, ASD, AGO) or assessment agencies (ONA, DIO). The Office of National Assessments itself plays a unique all-source intelligence assessment and intergovernmental co-ordination role.

As a middle power and G20 economy in the international community and a regional power in the Asia-Pacific and Indo-Pacific, Australia has played a major role in international security. The Australian Government is a member of the Five Eyes intelligence community, the ANZUS treaty, the Five Power Defence Arrangements, and the Commonwealth of Nations. The foreign policy of Australia is guided by its commitment to multilateralism and the United Nations and regionalism with the Pacific Islands Forum and the Association of Southeast Asian Nations alongside strong bilateral relations particularly in Oceania, Southeast Asia, the alliance with the United States, and Australia–China relations.

The Australian Defence Force has also deployed around the world for United Nations peacekeeping, regional peacekeeping operations including with the Regional Assistance Mission to the Solomon Islands and the International Force for East Timor, humanitarian relief, counterterrorism and special operations, border security in Operation Resolute, airborne surveillance operations and maritime monitoring operations in the South China Sea and South West Pacific, counterinsurgency and security assistance such as with the International Security Assistance Force in Afghanistan with Operation Slipper and Operation Highroad, and the fight against Islamic State of Iraq and the Levant with Operation Okra.

Domestically, the rise of violent extremism and threats of both Islamic and right-wing terrorism are key concerns of the Australian Government. Crime in Australia, including cybercrime and transnational crime such as human trafficking, arms trafficking, and the illegal drug trade, are ongoing risks to the security and safety of Australia.

== Governance and Coordination ==
=== National Security Committee of Cabinet ===
The National Security Committee of Cabinet (NSC) is a Cabinet committee and the peak ministerial decision-making body on national security, intelligence and defence matters. Decisions of the Committee do not require the endorsement of the Cabinet. It is chaired by the Prime Minister and the membership includes the Deputy Prime Minister, Attorney-General, Treasurer, Minister for Foreign Affairs, Minister for Defence, Minister for Immigration and Border Protection, and the ministerial Cabinet Secretary. Attendance also includes the Secretaries for each respective public service department, as well as the Chief of the Defence Force, the Director-General of Security and the Directors-General of the Office of National Assessments and the Australian Secret Intelligence Service.

=== Secretaries Committee on National Security ===
The Secretaries Committee on National Security (SCNS) (formerly the Secretaries Committee on Intelligence and Security) is the peak interdepartmental officials-level committee considering national security matters in support of the National Security Committee. It considers all major matters to be put before the NSC and has a strong role in ensuring that Australia maintains a coordinated policy approach on all national security issues. Membership of the SCNS includes the Secretaries of the Department of the Prime Minister and Cabinet, the Attorney-General's Department, the Department of Foreign Affairs and Trade, the Department of Defence, the Department of the Treasury, the Chief of the Australian Defence Force, and the Director-General of the Office of National Assessments. Other senior officials including the Commissioner of the Australian Federal Police, the Commissioner of the Australian Border Force, and the chief executive officerof the Australian Criminal Intelligence Commission, the Director-General of Security (Australian Security Intelligence Organisation), the Director-General of the Australian Secret Intelligence Service, and the Directors of the Defence Intelligence Organisation, the Australian Geospatial-Intelligence Organisation, and the Australian Signals Directorate.

=== National Intelligence Coordination Committee ===
The National Intelligence Coordination Committee (NICC) was formed in 2008 to provide strategic co-ordination for the effectiveness and integration of the national intelligence efforts. It is chaired by the Deputy Secretary of National Security and International Policy of the Department of the Prime Minister and Cabinet. The National Intelligence Coordination Committee comprises the chiefs of the ONA, ASIS, ASIO, DIO, ASD, AGO, AFP, ACIC, ABF, as well as the Deputy Secretary for Strategic Policy and Intelligence of the Department of Defence, the Deputy Secretary for National Security and Emergency Management of the Attorney-General's Department, and the Deputy Secretary responsible for international security of the Department of Foreign Affairs and Trade.

The National Intelligence Collection Management Committee (NICMC) is a subcommittee of the National Intelligence Coordination Committee and is responsible for setting specific requirements and evaluating collection effort against each of the National Intelligence Priorities (NIPs). It is chaired by the Director General of the Office of National Assessments.

The National Intelligence Open Source Committee (NIOSC) is a subcommittee of the National Intelligence Coordination Committee and is responsible for enhancing the co-ordination and capabilities of the national intelligence community's open source efforts. It is chaired by the Director General of the Office of National Assessments.

=== Australia-New Zealand Counter-Terrorism Committee ===
The Australia-New Zealand Counter-Terrorism Committee (ANZCTC) is a bilateral and intergovernmental high level body to co-ordinate counterterrorism capabilities, crisis management, command and control, intelligence and investigation functions composed of representatives from the Australian Government, Australian state and territory governments and the New Zealand Government. Formerly the National Counter-Terrorism Committee (NCTC), in October 2012, the New Zealand Government became members to encourage closer dialogue on matters of bilateral interest relevant to counter-terrorism. It was established by the Inter-Governmental Agreement in October 2002 to contribute to the security of the Australian community through co-ordination of a nationwide cooperative framework, known as the National Counter-Terrorism Plan. The Commonwealth Counter-Terrorism Coordinator is the Co-Chair of the Australia-New Zealand Counter-Terrorism Committee.

=== Australian Counter-Terrorism Centre ===
The Australian Counter-Terrorism Centre (ACTC) is an intergovernmental multi-agency body that coordinates counterterrorism in Australia, overseen by the Joint Counter Terrorism Board (JCTB) consisting of senior government officials. The ACTC provides strategic direction to set strategic counter-terrorism priorities, co-ordinate counter-terrorism policy, inform operational counter-terrorism priorities, evaluate performance on priorities, and identify and fix impediments to effective co-ordination of counterterrorism. Membership of the ACTC includes senior officials from the Australian Security Intelligence Organisation, the Australian Federal Police, the Australian Secret Intelligence Service, the Australian Signals Directorate, the Australian Border Force, the Australian Criminal Intelligence Commission, the Department of Foreign Affairs and Trade, and the Australian Transaction Reports and Analysis Centre. The Commonwealth Counter-Terrorism Coordinator is the Co-Chair of the Joint Counter Terrorism Board.

=== Australian Government Crisis Committee ===
The Australian Government Crisis Committee (AGCC) is the national co-ordination body composed of Ministers and senior officials from Australian Government agencies convened by the Department of the Prime Minister and Cabinet and supported by the Crisis Coordination Centre of Emergency Management Australia. AGCC may convene in response to any crisis, including a terrorist act, where the scope and resourcing of Commonwealth Government support to States and Territories requires senior officials' level co-ordination. The purpose of the AGCC is to ensure effective co-ordination of information, intelligence and response options to support the NSC. The AGCC does not extend to managing the deployment of resources or other activities of operational agencies.

The National Crisis Committee (NCC) is a national intergovernmental body for crisis co-ordination composed of senior officials from Commonwealth, State and Territory governments. It would be convened in the event of a terrorist act to co-ordinate information exchange regarding response and recovery within the Commonwealth Government and with the States and Territories. It is chaired by the Department of the Prime Minister and Cabinet and supported by the Crisis Coordination Centre of Emergency Management Australia.

=== Cyber Security Operations Board ===
The Cyber Security Operations Board (CSOB) is a secretary and agency head-level body responsible for strategic oversight of the government's operational cyber security capabilities and co-ordination of cyber security measures. It specifically oversees the work of the Australian Cyber Security Centre, the intergovernmental and interagency cybersecurity hub hosted by the Australian Signals Directorate. The Board is chaired by the Secretary of the Attorney-General's Department.

== Policy ==
=== Department of the Prime Minister and Cabinet ===
The National Security and International Policy Group of the Department of the Prime Minister and Cabinet, led by the Deputy Secretary for National Security and International Policy, provides advice on Australia's foreign, trade and treaty matters, defence, intelligence, non-proliferation, counter-terrorism, law enforcement, border security and emergency management matters, coordinates security-related science and technology research matters, and plays a co-ordinating leadership role in the development of integrated, whole-of-government national security policy. The National Security and International Policy Group comprises three divisions each led by a First Assistant Secretary as well as the Office of the Counter-Terrorism Coordinator with the rank of Deputy Secretary.

- The International Division provides advice, co-ordination and leadership on Australia's foreign, trade, aid and treaty matters and priorities, including bilateral relations, relationships with regional and international organisations, free trade negotiations and whole-of-government priorities for the overseas aid program. It also includes the South, South-East Asia, Americas and the Middle East Branch and the North Asia, Europe, Pacific, Africa and Trade Branch.
- The National Security Division provides advice, co-ordination and leadership on integrated, whole-of-government policy matters, priorities and strategy in the areas of military operations, defence strategy, domestic security and critical infrastructure protection. This Division is divided into the Defence Branch and the Domestic Security Unit.

=== Department of Home Affairs ===
The Department of Home Affairs was established on the 20 December 2017 through Administrative Arrangements Order bringing together the national security, law enforcement and emergency management functions of the Attorney-General's Department portfolio (including the AFP, and the ACIC), the entire Department of Immigration and Border Protection portfolio and the Australian Border Force, the transport security functions of the Department of Infrastructure and Regional Development, the counter-terrorism and cybersecurity functions of the Department of the Prime Minister and Cabinet, and the multicultural affairs functions of the Department of Social Services. ASIO will be transfer to Home Affairs once enabling legislations is pass by Parliament.

The Department of Home Affairs includes the following departmental units with responsibilities for national security and intelligence policy and coordination:

- Intelligence Division
- National Security and Law Enforcement Policy Division
- Transnational Serious and Organised Crime Division
- Countering Violent Extremism Centre

==== Commonwealth Counter-Terrorism Coordinator ====
The Commonwealth Counter-Terrorism Coordinator and the Centre for Counter-Terrorism Coordination within the Department of Home Affairs (formerly within the Department of the Prime Minister and Cabinet) provides strategic advice and support to the Minister for Home Affairs and the Prime Minister on all aspects of counterterrorism and countering violent extremism policy and co-ordination across government. The Office was created after recommendations from the Review of Australia's Counter-Terrorism Machinery in 2015 in response to the 2014 Sydney hostage crisis. The Commonwealth Counter-Terrorism Coordinator also serves as the Co-Chair and or Chair of the Australian and New Zealand Counter-Terrorism Committee and the Joint Counter-Terrorism Board, with the Centre for Counter-Terrorism Coordination providing secretariat support to the Australian Counter-Terrorism Centre and the Australian and New Zealand Counter-Terrorism Committee. Along with the Deputy Counter-Terrorism Coordinator, the Centre for Counter-Terrorism Coordination is also composed of the Counter-Terrorism Strategic Coordination Branch, the Domestic Operations and Engagement Branch, the Counter-Terrorism Capability Branch, and the Home Affairs Counter-Terrorism Policy Branch.

==== National Cyber Coordinator ====
The National Cyber Coordinator and the Cyber Security Policy Division within the Department of Home Affairs (formerly within the Department of the Prime Minister and Cabinet) is responsible for cyber security policy and the implementation of the Australian Government Cyber Security Strategy. The National Cyber Coordinator also ensures effective partnerships between Commonwealth, state and territory governments, the private sector, non-governmental organisations, the research community and the international partners. The National Cyber Coordinator also works closely with the Australian Cyber Security Centre and the Australian Ambassador for Cyber Issues.

CERT Australia is the national computer emergency response team responsible for cybersecurity responses and providing cyber security advice and support to critical infrastructure and other systems of national interest. CERT Australia works closely with other Australian Government agencies, international CERTs, and the private sector. It is also a key element in the Australian Cyber Security Centre, sharing information and working closely with ASIO, the Australian Federal Police, the Australian Signals Directorate, the Defence Intelligence Organisation and the Australian Criminal Intelligence Commission.

==== Critical Infrastructure Centre ====
The Australian Government Critical Infrastructure Centre (CIC) is responsible for whole-of-government co-ordination of critical infrastructure protection and national security risk assessments and advice. It was established on 23 January 2017 and brings together expertise and capability from across the Australian Government and functions in close consultation states and territory governments, regulators, and the private sector. The Centre also supports the Foreign Investment Review Board.

==== Crisis Coordination Centre ====
The Australian Government Crisis Coordination Centre (CCC) is an all-hazards co-ordination facility, which operates on a 24/7 basis, and supports the Australian Government Crisis Committee (AGCC) and the National Crisis Committee (NCC). The CCC provides whole-of-government all-hazards monitoring and situational awareness for domestic and international events and coordinates Australian Government responses to major domestic incidents. The Crisis Coordination Centre is managed by the Crisis Coordination Branch of Emergency Management Australia.

=== Department of Foreign Affairs and Trade ===
The International Security Division is the international security and foreign intelligence policy and governance co-ordination entity of the Department of Foreign Affairs and Trade. It is divided into three branches each led by an Assistant Secretary:

- The Counter-Terrorism Branch coordinates international counter-terrorism policy and activities. The branch also supports the Australian Ambassador for Counter-Terrorism.
- The Australian Ambassador for Cyber Affairs with the rank of Assistant Secretary is responsible for leading the Australian Government's international efforts in cybersecurity and cybercrime, supporting cyber capacity building in the Asia-Pacific region, and advocating for internet freedoms. The Ambassador will work with the Special Adviser to the Prime Minister on Cyber Security to implement the Cyber Security Strategy and will encourage collaboration between Australian Government, business, academia and communities to improve cyber security.
- The Arms Control and Counter-Proliferation Branch coordinates international arms control, disarmament, and non-proliferation policy.
- The Strategic Issues and Intelligence Branch provides analysis, research and advice on strategic issues, foreign intelligence and other international security affairs. The Branch includes the Intelligence Policy and Liaison Section.

=== Department of Defence ===
The Defence Strategic Policy and Intelligence Group was established on 8 February 2016 as a key recommendation of the First Principles Review of the Australian Defence Organisation. The Group integrates the policy, strategy and intelligence functions of the Australian Defence Organisation to deliver high-quality advice to the Australian Government, the Secretary of the Department of Defence and the Chief of the Defence Force. The Group is led by a Deputy Secretary and comprises four divisions and three intelligence agencies.

- The Strategic Policy Division develops policy, military strategy and strategic planning and advice for the Australian Government, senior Defence leaders and other government agencies on the strategic implications of defence and national security matters. The Division comprises the Military Strategy Branch, the Strategic Policy Branch, the Arms Control Branch, and the Intelligence Policy Integration Branch.
- The International Policy Division provides strategic-level policy advice to the Australian Government on the central issues of Australia's defence policy, including international defence relations and ADF operations. The Division comprises the South East Asia Branch, the Global Interests Branch, the Major Powers Branch, the Pacific and Timor-Leste Branch, and numerous overseas military attaché postings.
- The Contestability Division provides arms-length internal contestability functions across the capability life-cycles as to ensure the capability needs and requirements of the Australian Defence Organisation are aligned with strategy and resources.
- The Defence Industry Policy Division has responsibility for the implementation of defence industry policy, engagement and innovation as well as Australian export controls.

=== Attorney-General's Department ===
The Attorney-General's Department is the chief law office of Australia. On the 20 December 2017 by Administrative Arrangements Order, law enforcement and emergency management functions of the department moved to the newly established Department of Home Affairs. ASIO will remain part of the Attorney-General's Department until legislations is pass for transition to Home Affairs. However, the Attorney-General's Department will have responsibilities for the oversight and integrity of the Australian Intelligence Community through the transfer of the Inspector-General of Intelligence and Security, the Independent National Security Legislation Monitor, and the Commonwealth Ombudsman from the Department of the Prime Minister and Cabinet. The Attorney-General of Australia also retains the responsibility for the authorisation of ASIO operations, the Commonwealth Director of Public Prosecutions, and various other criminal law policy matters.

The Attorney-General's Department includes the Security and Criminal Law Division which is responsible for providing policy and legislative advice with regards to intelligence, criminal, electronic surveillance and counter-terrorism law, anti-corruption, fraud, and protective security policy. The Division is also responsible for international arrangements for anti-corruption, intelligence management within the department, and whole-of-government advice for criminal offences. The Division includes the National Security Coordination Unit, the Communications Security and Intelligence Branch.

== Primary Entities ==
=== Australian Security Intelligence Organisation ===
The Australian Security Intelligence Organisation (ASIO) is Australia's national security service with the main role is to gather information and produce intelligence that will enable it to warn the government about activities or situations that might endanger Australia's national security. The ASIO Act defines "security" as the protection of Australia's territorial and border integrity from serious threats, and the protection of Australia and its people from espionage, sabotage, politically motivated violence, the promotion of communal violence, attacks on Australia's defence system, and acts of foreign interference. ASIO also includes the Counter-Terrorism Control Centre which is responsible for setting and managing counter-terrorism priorities, identifying intelligence requirements, and ensuring the processes of collecting and distributing counter terrorism information are fully harmonised and effective. The National Threat Assessment Centre is also part of ASIO and is responsible for analysis of terrorist threats to Australian interests overseas and terrorist threats and threats from violent protests in Australia.

The Business Liaison Unit (BLU) of ASIO provides a conduit between the private sector and the Australian Intelligence Community. It seeks to provide industry security and risk managers with credible, intelligence-backed reporting that enables them to brief executive management and staff authoritatively, and to use this knowledge for their risk management and continuity planning.

==== National Threat Assessment Centre ====
The National Threat Assessment Centre (NTAC) of ASIO prepares assessments of the likelihood and probable nature of terrorism and protest violence, including against Australia, Australians and Australian interests here and abroad, special events and international interests in Australia. Threat Assessments support jurisdictions and agencies to make risk management decisions to determine how best to respond to the threat and mitigate risk.

==== Counter Terrorism Control Centre ====
The Counter Terrorism Control Centre (CTCC) is a multi-agency located within ASIO which sets and manages counter-terrorism priorities, identifies intelligence requirements, and ensures that the processes of collecting and distributing counter-terrorism information are fully harmonised and effective across the spectrum of Australia's counter-terrorism activity. The CTCC has senior level representation from ASIS, AFP, ASD, and AGO.

==== National Interception Technical Assistance Centre ====
The National Interception Technical Assistance Centre (NiTAC) of ASIO is an inter-agency central point of reference for technical assistance, advice, and support particularly regarding telecommunications interception and signals intelligence.

=== Australian Secret Intelligence Service ===
The Australian Secret Intelligence Service (ASIS) is Australia's overseas secret HUMINT collection agency with the mission to protect and promote Australia's vital interests through the provision of unique foreign intelligence services as directed by Government. ASIS's primary goal is to obtain and distribute secret intelligence about the capabilities, intentions and activities of individuals or organisations outside Australia, which may impact on Australia's interests and the well-being of its citizens.

=== Australian Geospatial-Intelligence Organisation ===
The Australian Geospatial-Intelligence Organisation (AGO) was established by amalgamating the Australian Imagery Organisation, the Directorate of Strategic Military Geographic Information, and the Defence Topographic Agency to provide geospatial intelligence, from imagery and other sources, in support of the Australian Defence Force and national security interests.

==== Geospatial Analysis Centre ====
The AGO hosts the Geospatial Analysis Centre (GAC) outside of Bendigo, Victoria which provides geospatial intelligence support to the Australian Defence Organisation and the Australian Intelligence Community across geospatial information and mapping services including targeting foundation data, and three-dimensional modelling and visualisation products.

=== Australian Signals Directorate ===
The Australian Signals Directorate (ASD) is responsible for collection, analysis and distribution of foreign signals intelligence and is the national authority on communications, information, cyber and computer security. The ASD also includes the Cyber Security Operations Centre which coordinates and assists with operational responses to cyber events of national importance and provides government with a consolidated understanding of the cyber threat through its intrusion detection, analytic and threat assessment capabilities.

==== Joint Defence Facility Pine Gap ====
The Joint Defence Facility Pine Gap is a joint Australia-United States military signals intelligence and satellite ground station outside of Alice Springs, Northern Territory. The Chief of the Facility is a senior official of the United States Intelligence Community (usually the Central Intelligence Agency) and the Deputy Chief serves concurrently as the Assistant Secretary for Technical Intelligence of the Australian Signals Directorate. Personnel from the Australian Geospatial-Intelligence Organisation, the Defence Science and Technology Group, the United States’ Central Intelligence Agency, its National Security Agency, National Geospatial-Intelligence Agency, National Reconnaissance Office, the United States Naval Network Warfare Command, the United States Air Force Twenty-Fifth Air Force (including the 566th Intelligence Squadron of the 544th Intelligence, Surveillance and Reconnaissance Group), the United States Army Intelligence and Security Command, and the Marine Cryptologic Support Battalion are also present.

==== Australian Cyber Security Centre ====
The Australian Cyber Security Centre (ACSC) works across cybersecurity including analysing, investigating and reporting cyber threats and co-ordinating national security capabilities and operations for incidents of cybercrime, cyberterrorism, and cyberwarfare. The ACSC is joint responsibility of the Minister for Defence and the Attorney-General. The Deputy Director of the Australian Signals Directorate serves as the Coordinator of the Australian Cyber Security Centre which integrates the national security cyber capabilities across Defence Intelligence Organisation strategic intelligence analysts, the Computer Emergency Response Team of the Attorney-General's Department, Australian Security Intelligence Organisation cyber investigations and telecommunication security specialists, Australian Federal Police cyber crime investigators, and Australian Criminal Intelligence Commission cyber crime threat intelligence specialists.

=== Defence Intelligence Organisation ===
The Defence Intelligence Organisation (DIO) is the national military intelligence and intelligence assessment agency that provides services and advice at the national security level with the mandate to support the Australian Defence Force, Department of Defence and the Australian Government and national security decision-making and to assist with the planning and conduct of Australian Defence Force operations.

=== Office of National Intelligence ===
The Office of National Intelligence (ONI) produces all-source assessments on international political, strategic and economic developments as an independent body directly accountable to the Prime Minister and provides advice and assessments to other Senior Ministers in the National Security Committee of Cabinet, and Senior Officials of Government Departments. ONI operates under its own legislation and has responsibility for co-ordinating/analysing and verifying/evaluating Australia's foreign intelligence priorities & activities. It draws its information from other intelligence agencies, as well as diplomatic reporting, information and reporting from other government agencies, and open source material.

==== Open Source Centre ====
The Open Source Centre (OSC) of ONI collects, researches, and analyses open source information in support of Australia's national security. In line with ONI's mandate under the ONI Act, the OSC focuses on international developments that affect Australia's national interests. Its principal consumers are the departments and agencies that make up Australia's national intelligence community.

== Secondary Entities ==
=== Australian Federal Police ===
The Australian Federal Police (AFP) is the federal law enforcement agency under the Attorney-General's Department. It provides criminal intelligence and other intelligence capabilities across all operational functions and crime types. Divided into operational intelligence teams, the division collects, collates, analyses and disseminates intelligence on nationally significant criminal issues of interest to the AFP. Areas of intelligence operations extend to crime related to people smuggling, illicit drugs, human trafficking and sexual servitude, financial crime, counter-terrorism, high-tech crime, and child sex tourism.

The Intelligence Division is the criminal intelligence and national security intelligence division of the AFP. The Intelligence Division is project-driven and multi-jurisdictional in its functions, using capabilities from the AFP National Headquarters and the relevant field offices.

==== Joint Counter Terrorism Teams ====
The Joint Counter Terrorism Teams (JCTT) of the Australian Federal Police operate in each state and territory jurisdiction consisting of AFP, state and territory police, and ASIO officers. JCTTs conduct investigations to prevent, respond to and investigate terrorist threats and attacks in Australia.

==== Australian Bomb Data Centre ====
The Australian Bomb Data Centre (ABDC) of the AFP is Australia's primary source of information and intelligence relating to the unlawful use of explosives. The ABDC officially began operations on 1 July 1978, and it is therefore one of the oldest bomb data centres in the world. The ABDC provides statistical reporting on all explosive incidents reported to the Centre by Australian policing and military agencies. This includes any minor incidents or acts of vandalism reported by the relevant agency. The ABDC is concerned both with criminals who use explosives for their own benefit and with those who use explosives and bombs for terrorism. It maintains records of all bomb-related incidents reported to it, regardless of design, target or motive. The ABDC is staffed by members of the AFP as well as members of the Australian Defence Force.

==== Australian High Tech Crime Centre ====
The Australian High Tech Crime Centre (AHTCC) is a national cybercrime and cybersecurity initiative located within the AFP with staff also from the Australian Security Intelligence Organisation and Australian Signals Directorate. The primary role of the AHTCC is to co-ordinate the efforts of Australian law enforcement in combating serious, complex and multi-jurisdictional high tech crimes, especially those beyond the capability of single policing jurisdictions in Australia. Secondary roles include protecting the information infrastructure of Australia, and providing information to other law enforcement to help combat online crime.

=== Australian Criminal Intelligence Commission ===
The Australian Criminal Intelligence Commission (ACIC) is Australia's national criminal intelligence agency with investigative, research and information delivery functions under the Attorney-General's Department. It has a range of statutory functions centred on intelligence collection, dissemination and investigations regarding nationally significant, complex, serious and or major crimes. The ACIC recommends national criminal intelligence priorities (NCIPs), works collaboratively with international partners and federal, state and territory agencies, and maintains ongoing powers similar to a Royal Commission. The ACIC shapes the national agenda on fighting serious crime, provides solutions for national serious crime priorities and maintains a leading capability in national criminal intelligence.

The ACIC is responsible for delivering national policing information services, developing and maintaining national information-sharing services between state, territory and federal law enforcement agencies, consolidating criminal intelligence, and providing national criminal history record checks for accredited agencies. The ACIC maintains and provides the National Automated Fingerprint Identification System (NAFIS), the National Criminal Investigation DNA Database (NCIDD), the National Child Offender System (NCOS), the Child Exploitation Tracking System (CETS), the National Police Reference System (NPRS), the National Firearms Licensing and Registration System (NFLRS), the National Vehicles of Interest Register, the National Police Checking Service, National Missing Persons and Victim System (NMPVS) and is developing the National DNA Investigative Capability (NDIC).

=== Australian Transaction Reports and Analysis Centre ===
The Australian Transaction Reports and Analysis Centre (AUSTRAC) is the national financial intelligence agency under the Department of Home Affairs. It is responsible for gathering intelligence on and regulating money laundering, terrorism financing and major financial crimes.

=== Australian Border Force ===
The Australian Border Force (ABF) of the Department of Home Affairs manages the security and integrity of Australia's borders. It works closely with other government and international agencies to detect and deter unlawful movement of goods and people across the border.

- The Counter Terrorism Unit (CTU) of the ABF are teams of officers based at major international airports who provide a front-line response capability to act when persons of national security interest attempt to cross the border. The CTU randomly assesses individuals and also relies upon intelligence to target individuals.
- The Intelligence Division of the ABF is responsible for the assessment of new and emerging threats to the border and customs and the provision of intelligence and targeting that informs and underpins risk mitigation. The division consists of the Intelligence Analysis and Assessments Branch and the Operational Intelligence Branch.
- The National Border Targeting Centre (NBTC) of the ABF is a border security intelligence organisation established to target high-risk international passengers and cargo, particularly illicit substances and potential terrorists. The NBTC includes staff from the AFP, ASIO, ACC, DFAT, Department of Agriculture, and the Office of Transport Security.
- The Strategic Border Command (SBC) of the ABF is the formal command and control entity for border security, distinct from the Border Protection Command. The SBC comprises the Investigations, Compliance and Enforcement Branch and the Special Investigations and Programmes Branch along with regional commands in NSW/ACT, VIC/TAS, QLD, WA, and Central.
- The Maritime Border Command is a Royal Australian Navy and Australian Border Force joint command which provides security for Australia's offshore maritime areas. Combining the resources and expertise of the ABF and the RAN, and working with the Australian Fisheries Management Authority and other government agencies, it delivers a coordinated national approach to Australia's offshore maritime security.

== Oversight ==
=== Executive Oversight ===
The Inspector-General of Intelligence and Security (IGIS) is the independent statutory office in the Commonwealth of Australia responsible for reviewing the activities of the six intelligence agencies which collectively comprise the Australian Intelligence Community (AIC). With own motion powers in addition to considering complaints or requests from ministers, IGIS is a key element of the accountability regime for Australia's intelligence and security agencies.

The Independent National Security Legislation Monitor (INSLM) is the independent review body of the Australian Government responsible for reviewing the operation, effectiveness and implications of Australia's counter‑terrorism and national security legislation on an ongoing basis. The INSLM also considers whether legislation contains appropriate safeguards for protecting the rights of individuals, remains proportionate to any threat of terrorism or threat to national security or both, and remains necessary. Australian security and intelligence agencies provide the INSLM with information (both classified and unclassified), relevant to the above functions. This is under compulsion in some circumstances. The INSLM makes recommendations on these matters in reports, which are then tabled in Parliament.

The Independent Reviewer of Adverse Security Assessments is an independent official of the Attorney-General's Department with the responsibilities to review Australian Security Intelligence Organisation adverse security assessments given to the Department of Immigration and Border Protection in relation to people who remain in immigration detention and have been found to engage Australia's protection obligations under international law, and not be eligible for a permanent protection visa, or who have had their permanent protection visa cancelled. The Independent Reviewer of Adverse Security Assessments examines all material relied upon by ASIO in making the security assessment, as well as other relevant material, and forms an opinion on whether the assessment is an appropriate outcome. The applicant may also submit material for the Independent Reviewer's consideration. The Independent Reviewer provides their recommendations to the Director-General of Security. The Director-General must respond to the reviewer and may determine whether to take action if he agrees with the reviewer's opinion. The applicant will be told the outcome of the review, including the Director-General's response. The Attorney-General of Australia, Minister for Immigration and Border Protection, and the Inspector-General of Intelligence and Security are also provided with copies of the Independent Reviewer's recommendations.

The Australian Human Rights Commission is the Australian national human rights institution and the independent statutory body with the responsibility for investigating alleged infringements under Australia's anti-discrimination legislation in relation to Commonwealth agencies.

The Commonwealth Ombudsman is the national ombudsman of Australian which has responsibilities to investigate complaints about the actions and decisions of Australian Government agencies and services delivered by most private contractors for the Australian Government, to and oversee complaint investigations conducted by the Australian Federal Police. The Ombudsman can also investigate complaints about delays in processing Freedom of Information requests (FOI) and complaints about FOI charges. The Commonwealth Ombudsman is also the Australian Defence Force Ombudsman, Immigration Ombudsman, Postal Industry Ombudsman, Taxation Ombudsman, and Law Enforcement Ombudsman. In addition, the Ombudsman has a number of statutory oversight functions in relation to law enforcement agency use of special powers, including those under the Telecommunications (Interception and Access) Act 1979, Surveillance Devices Act 2004 and Part 1AB of the Crimes Act 1914.

The Office of the Australian Information Commissioner is an independent Australian Government agency, functioning as the national data protection authority for Australia, and reports to the Parliament of Australia.

The Australian National Audit Office (ANAO) is the national auditor for the Parliament of Australia and Government of Australia. The ANAO supports the Auditor-General of Australia with the main functions and powers under the Auditor-General Act 1997 (Cth) including auditing financial statements of Commonwealth agencies and authorities in accordance with the Financial Management and Accountability Act 1997 (Cth) and conducting performance audits which are tabled in Parliament.

The Australian Commission for Law Enforcement Integrity (ACLEI) is an Australian government statutory agency, created under the Law Enforcement Integrity Commissioner Act 2006. Its role is to support the Law Enforcement Integrity Commissioner, detecting and preventing corruption in the Australian Criminal Intelligence Commission, Australian Border Force, the Australian Federal Police, and Australian Transaction Reports and Analysis Centre. Priority is given to investigations of serious and systemic political corruption. ACLEI supports the Integrity Commissioner by collecting intelligence regarding corruption. The Integrity Commissioner is required to make recommendation to the federal government regarding improvements to legislation that will prevent corrupt practices or their early detection.

The Inspector of Transport Security is the national oversight entity for transport security and the Office of Transport Security. Under the Department of Infrastructure and Regional Development, the Inspector of Transport Security inquires into major transport or offshore security incidents or a pattern or series of incidents that point to a systemic failure or possible weakness of aviation or maritime transport security regulatory systems.

=== Parliamentary Oversight ===
The Parliamentary Joint Committee on Intelligence and Security (PJCIS) is the parliamentary body responsible for oversight for the Australian Security Intelligence Organisation, the Australian Secret Intelligence Service, the Australian Signals Directorate, the Defence Intelligence Organisation, the Australian Geospatial-Intelligence Organisation, and the Office of National Intelligence. The PJCIS's main function is the administrative and expenditure review and oversight of the primary agencies of the Australian Intelligence Community. The Committee does not review intelligence gathering or operational procedures or priorities, nor does it conduct inquiries into individual complaints about the activities of the intelligence agencies. The Committee comprises eleven members: five from the Senate and six from the House of Representatives. Six members are from the Government and five from the Opposition. Serving ministers are not allowed to be members.

The Senate Foreign Affairs, Defence and Trade Committee is a standing committee of the Australian Senate with the responsibilities for the parliamentary oversight of the portfolios of the Department of Defence (Australia) and its agencies (including the Defence Intelligence Organisation, the Australian Signals Directorate, and the Australian Geospatial-Intelligence Organisation) and the Department of Foreign Affairs and Trade and its agencies (including the Australian Secret Intelligence Service). The Committee's purpose is to deal with legislative bills referred by the Senate and to oversee the budget estimates process and performance reporting of the portfolio entities.

The Senate Legal and Constitutional Affairs Committee is a standing committee of the Australian Senate with the responsibilities for the parliamentary oversight of the portfolios of the Attorney-General's Department and its agencies (including the Australian Security Intelligence Organisation, the Australian Transaction Reports and Analysis Centre, and the Australian Criminal Intelligence Commission) and the Department of Home Affairs and its agencies (including the Australian Federal Police and Australian Border Force). The Committee's purpose is to deal with legislative bills referred by the Senate and to oversee the budget estimates process and performance reporting of the portfolio entities.

The Senate Finance and Public Administration Committee is a standing committee of the Australian Senate with the responsibilities for the parliamentary oversight of the portfolios of the Department of the Prime Minister and Cabinet and its agencies (including the Office of National Assessments and the Inspector-General of Intelligence and Security) and the Department of Finance and its agencies. The Committee's purpose is to deal with legislative bills referred by the Senate and to oversee the budget estimates process and performance reporting of the portfolio entities.

The Parliamentary Joint Committee on Law Enforcement is the parliamentary body responsible for oversight for the Australian Criminal Intelligence Commission and the Australian Federal Police. It is tasked with monitoring, reviewing and reporting on the performance of the ACIC and AFP and to examine trends and changes in criminal activities in Australia.

The Joint Standing Committee on Foreign Affairs, Defence and Trade is a joint parliamentary committee, administered through the House of Representatives, with responsibilities to consider and report on such matters relating to the portfolios of the Australian Defence Organisation and the Department of Foreign Affairs and Trade as may be referred to it by either the Parliament or a Minister. The Committee may also inquire into matters raised in annual reports of the portfolio departments and agencies or in reports of the Australian National Audit Office.

=== Judicial Review ===
The Federal Court of Australia is an Australian superior court of record which has jurisdiction to deal with most civil disputes governed by federal law (with the exception of family law matters), along with some summary (less serious) criminal matters. Cases are heard at first instance by single Judges. The Court includes an appeal division referred to as the Full Court comprising three Judges, the only avenue of appeal from which lies to the High Court of Australia. In the Australian court hierarchy, the Federal Court occupies a position equivalent to the Supreme Courts of each of the states and territories. In relation to the other Courts in the federal stream, it is equal to the Family Court of Australia, and superior to the Federal Circuit Court. It was established in 1976 by the Federal Court of Australia Act.

The Administrative Appeals Tribunal includes the Security Division, for appeals of applications regarding national security assessments under the Australian Security Intelligence Organisation Act 1979.

== Related Entities ==
The Defence Science and Technology Group (DST Group) of the Department of Defence provides science and technology support for Australia's defence and national security needs. It is Australia's second largest government-funded science organisation after the Commonwealth Scientific and Industrial Research Organisation. The DST Group provides scientific and technical support to current defence operations, investigates future technologies for defence and national security applications, advises on the purchase and use of defence equipment, develops new defence capabilities, and enhances existing systems by improving performance and safety and reducing the cost of owning defence assets. The DST Group National Security and Intelligence, Surveillance and Reconnaissance Division undertakes advanced scientific research and development into technologies across national security, military, and intelligence capabilities of the Australian Government. Research areas include cybersecurity, border security, forensic science, geospatial intelligence, measurement and signature intelligence, human intelligence analytics, and surveillance and reconnaissance systems.

The Office of Transport Security (OTS) is the protective security regulator for the aviation and maritime sectors and the principal transport security advisory entity of Australia. An entity of the Department of Infrastructure and Regional Development, the OTS works with the states and territories, other government agencies, international bodies, and the aviation and maritime industry to improve security and prevent transport security incidents. The OTS develops and provides transport security intelligence, transport security policy and planning, and transport security regulation and compliance.

The Australian Safeguards and Non-proliferation Office (ASNO) of Department of Foreign Affairs and Trade is responsible for safeguarding and ensuring the non-proliferation of weapons of mass destruction. ASNO consists of the Australian Safeguards Office (ASO), the Chemical Weapons Convention Office (CWCO), and the Australian Comprehensive Test Ban Office (ACTBO). ASNO ensures that Australia's international obligations are met under the Nuclear Non-Proliferation Treaty (NPT), Australia's NPT safeguards agreement with the International Atomic Energy Agency (IAEA), the Convention on the Physical Protection of Nuclear Material (CPPNM) and Australia's various bilateral safeguards agreements. ASNO has four main areas of responsibility in the nuclear area which are application of safeguards in Australia, the physical protection and security of nuclear items in Australia, the operation of Australia's bilateral safeguards agreements, and the contribution to the operation and development of IAEA safeguards and the strengthening of the international nuclear non-proliferation regime. ASNO also ensures that Australia's international obligations under the Chemical Weapons Convention (CWC) and Biological Weapons Convention (BWC) are met whilst promoting their international implementation particularly in the Asia-Pacific. ASNO also contributes to the Comprehensive Nuclear-Test-Ban Treaty (CTBT) and the CTBTO Preparatory Commission.

The Australian Army Intelligence Corps (AUSTINT) is a corps of the Australian Army for strategic, operational and tactical military intelligence. The Corps also provides staff to the Defence Intelligence Organisation, Australian Signals Directorate and Australian Geospatial-Intelligence Organisation as well as major Australian Defence Force command headquarters.

The Australian Special Operations Command is a command within the Australian Defence Force uniting all Australian Army special forces including the Special Air Service Regiment and the Special Operations Engineer Regiment.

The Defence Security and Vetting Service (DSVS) (formerly the Defence Security Authority) supports the Department of Defence and the Australian Defence Force with protective security matters. The DSVS has responsibilities for developing and promulgating security policy that complies with Australian Government protective security policy, monitoring and reporting on security compliance, performance and risks, investigating serious and complex security incidents, granting security clearances for Defence and Defence Industry Security Program members, and conducting clearance revalidations and re-evaluations, assisting Groups and the Services with security policy implementation, and managing the Defence Industry Security Program. The DSVS also oversees the Australian Government Security Vetting Agency.

The Australian Defence Force Investigative Service (ADFIS) is the agency responsible for complex and major investigations involving the Australian Defence Force.

== Legislation ==
- Intelligence Services Act 2001
- Intelligence Services Amendment Act 2004
- Independent National Security Legislation Monitor Act 2010
- Charter of the Australian Security Intelligence Organisation
- Australian Security Intelligence Organisation Act 1979

== International Partnerships ==
- UKUSA Agreement
- ANZUS
- Combined Communications Electronics Board

== Former Entities ==
The National Security Advisor (NSA) was a position that existed under the Rudd government and Gillard government from 2007 to 2013 which was the chief advisor for national security and international security policy and co-ordination, with the rank of Associate Secretary of the National Security and International Policy Group of the Department of the Prime Minister and Cabinet. The National Security Advisor served as the Chair and or Co-Chair of the Australian and New Zealand Counter-Terrorism Committee and the Joint Counter-Terrorism Board.

The Heads of Intelligence Agencies Meeting (HIAM) and Foreign Intelligence Coordination Committee (FCIC) were senior deliberative and co-ordination bodies of the Australian Intelligence Community for the consideration of issues relating specifically to Australia's foreign intelligence activities. It was chaired by the Director General of the Office of National Assessments.

The Defence Intelligence Board (DIB) is a former governance entity with responsibility for the oversight and strategic co-ordination of military intelligence and the Defence Intelligence and Security Group. Chaired by the Deputy Secretary for Intelligence and Security, the DIB included representation from ONA, the Defence Science and Technology Organisation, and Australian Army, the Royal Australian Navy, and the Royal Australian Air Force.

The Joint Intelligence Organisation is the predecessor to the Defence Intelligence Organisation and the Office of National Assessments with former responsibilities for the analysis of defence and foreign intelligence.

The Allied Intelligence Bureau was a joint United States-Australian-Dutch-British human intelligence and covert action agency in the Pacific Ocean theatre of World War II.

The Central Bureau was a joint Allied military intelligence signals intelligence organisation attached to the South West Pacific Command. Central Bureau's role was to research and decrypt intercepted Imperial Japanese Army land and air traffic and work in close co-operation with other signals intelligence units in the US, United Kingdom and India.

Plaque at 21 Henry St, Ascot, Queensland

The Fleet Radio Unit was a joint Royal Australian Navy-United States Navy signals intelligence unit in Melbourne (FRUMEL), attached to the United States Seventh Fleet.

The Combined Field Intelligence Service also known as the Coastwatchers was an Allied military intelligence initiative. The Australian Commonwealth Naval Board first established the coastwatching organisation, operated through the Naval Intelligence Division, in 1922. Originally confined to Australia, it expanded after the outbreak of war in 1939 to New Guinea and to the Solomon Islands. Coastwatchers were stationed on remote Pacific islands during the Pacific Ocean theatre of World War II to observe enemy movements and rescue stranded Allied personnel particularly in the South West Pacific theatre and as an early warning network during the Guadalcanal campaign.

The Services Reconnaissance Department also known as Special Operations Australia (SOA) and the Inter-Allied Services Department was an Australian Defence Force military intelligence and special reconnaissance unit during World War II. It was modelled initially on the British Special Operations Executive (SOE). The Allied Intelligence Bureau acted as its controlling body from 1942, with the Services Reconnaissance Department becoming Section A within the Allied Intelligence Bureau. The Services Reconnaissance Department oversaw intelligence-gathering, reconnaissance and raiding missions in Japanese-occupied areas of New Guinea, the Dutch East Indies (Indonesia), Portuguese Timor (East Timor), the Malayan Peninsula, British Borneo and Singapore.

== See also ==
- List of intelligence agencies
- Intelligence cycle
- List of intelligence gathering disciplines

Australia

- Australian Defence Force
- Australian Special Forces
- Australian Police Tactical Groups
- Australian Law Enforcement

Five Eyes

- ECHELON and Five Eyes
- United States Intelligence Community
- United Kingdom Intelligence Community
- New Zealand Intelligence Community
- Canadian Intelligence Community

Overseas

- Russian Intelligence Community
- Chinese National Security
- Japanese Security Police, National Public Safety Commission and Public Security Intelligence Agency
- Indonesian National Police and Indonesian National Armed Forces
