= Independent National Security Legislation Monitor =

Independent oversight body of the Australian Government

Agency overview
- Formed: 2011
- Jurisdiction: Commonwealth of Australia
- Headquarters: Canberra, Australian Capital Territory, Australia
- Minister responsible: Prime Minister
- Agency executive: Mr Grant Donaldson SC, Independent National Security Legislation Monitor
- Parent agency: Attorney-General's Department
- Website: https://www.inslm.gov.au

The Independent National Security Legislation Monitor (INSLM) is a statutory independent executive oversight body of the Australian Government responsible for the ongoing review of the operation, effectiveness and implications of Australian counter‑terrorism and national security legislation. The INSLM also considers whether legislation contains appropriate safeguards for protecting the rights of individuals, remains proportionate to any threat of terrorism and or threat to national security, and remains necessary. As such the INSLM is a major part of the oversight regime of the Australian Intelligence Community together with the Inspector-General of Intelligence and Security and the Parliamentary Joint Committee on Intelligence and Security.

== History ==
The INSLM was established by the Independent National Security Legislation Monitor Act 2010. The post has many similarities with the role of Independent Reviewer of Terrorism Legislation in the United Kingdom.

== Role ==
Since 2011, the INSLM has conducted inquiries on national security legislative issues and issued reports assessing counter-terrorism and national security legislation and making recommendations for reform. Australian security and intelligence agencies provide the INSLM with information (both classified and unclassified), relevant to the above functions. This is under compulsion in some circumstances. The INSLM makes recommendations on these matters in reports, which are then tabled in Parliament.

== Reports ==
The INSLM has published the following reports in relation to their reviews.

Report	Date	Description
Telecommunications and other Legislation Amendment (Assistance and Access) Act 2018 and related matters	9 July 2020	On 30 June 2020, the INSLM (Dr James Renwick CSC SC) completed his report on Telecommunications and other Legislation Amendment (Assistance & Access) Act 2018 and related matters. This was a matter referred to the INSLM by the Parliamentary Joint Committee on Intelligence and Security (PJCIS).
Review of the terrorism-related citizenship loss provisions in the Australia Citizenship Act 2007	18 September 2019	The Attorney-General the Hon Christian Porter MP, referred for my review the operation, effectiveness and implications of the terrorism-related citizenship loss provisions in the Australian Citizenship Act 2007, to be reported on by 15 August 2019.
The prosecution and sentencing of children for terrorism	2 April 2019	Under s 7 of the INSLM Act, following a suggestion made by the CDPP, Ms Sarah McNaughton SC, the then Prime Minister, the Hon Malcolm Turnbull MP, referred for review the matter of ‘the prosecution and sentencing of children for terrorism offences’.
INSLM Statutory Deadline Reviews	5 March 2018	On 7 September 2017, the INSLM Dr James Renwick SC completed his reports on Statutory Deadline Reviews which includes legislation for: Division 3A of Part 1AA of the Crimes Act (Stop, Search & Seize powers), Sections 119.2 and 119.3 of the Criminal Code (Declared Areas), and Divisions 104 and 105 of the Criminal Code (Control Orders & Preventative Detention Orders) including the interoperability of the control order regime and the High Risk Terrorist Offenders Act 2016.
The prosecution and sentencing of children for terrorism	2 April 2019	Under s 7 of the INSLM Act, following a suggestion made by the CDPP, Ms Sarah McNaughton SC, the then Prime Minister, the Hon Malcolm Turnbull MP, referred for review the matter of ‘the prosecution and sentencing of children for terrorism offences’.
Certain Questioning and Detention Powers in Relation to Terrorism	8 February 2017	
Certain Matters Regarding the Impact of Amendments to the Counter-Terrorism Legislation Amendment (Foreign Fighters) Bill 2014	2 May 2016	On 2 May 2016 the former INSLM, the Hon. Roger Gyles AO QC, completed a report on the impacts of certain amendments proposed to the Counter-Terrorism Legislation Amendment (Foreign Fighters) Bill 2014 by the Parliamentary Joint Committee on Intelligence and Security. This was a matter referred to the INSLM by the Prime Minister.
Section 35P of the ASIO Act	2 February 2016	On 21 October 2015 the former INSLM, the Hon. Roger Gyles AO QC, completed a report on the impact on journalists of section 35P of the Australian Security Intelligence Organisation Act 1979 (ASIO Act). This was a matter referred to the INSLM by the then Prime Minister. This report discusses the impact on journalists of the operation of section 35P of the ASIO Act concerning offences for the disclosure of information relating to a special intelligence operation.
Control Order Safeguards	29 January 2016	On 29 January 2016 the former INSLM, the Hon. Roger Gyles AO QC, completed Part 1 of a report on whether a system of special advocates should be implemented in relation to the control order regime. This was a matter referred to the INSLM by the then Prime Minister. On 20 April 2016, Part 2 of the Control Order Safeguards Report was completed. Part 2 of the Report considered other additional safeguards recommended in the 2013 Council of Australian Government Review of Counter-Terrorism Legislation in relation to the control order regime.

The INSLM also publishes Annual Reports, which contain updates on reviews as well as information on the INSLM's activities throughout the reporting period.

== Office-holders ==
- Mr Bret Walker SC (21 April 2011 to 20 April 2014)
- The Hon Roger Gyles AO QC (20 August 2015 to 31 October 2016)
- Dr James Renwick CSC SC (February 2017 to 30 June 2020)
- Mr Grant Donaldson SC (November 2020 to November 2023)
- Mr Jack Blight (November 2023 to present)

== See also ==
- Australian Intelligence Community
- Inspector-General of Intelligence and Security
