= Australian Defence Organisation =

Australian government agency

Agency overview
- Formed: 9 February 1976
- Jurisdiction: Australia
- Headquarters: Canberra
- Employees: 82,724 (2024–25, estimated)
- Annual budget: A$53.58 billion (2024–25, estimated)
- Ministers responsible: Richard Marles, Minister for Defence; Pat Conroy, Minister for Defence Industry and Capability Delivery; Matt Keogh, Minister for Veterans' Affairs, Minister for Defence Personnel
- Agency executives: Greg Moriarty, Secretary of Defence; David Johnston, Chief of the Defence Force
- Child agencies: Australian Defence Force; Department of Defence
- Website: defence.gov.au

The Australian Defence Organisation (ADO), also known as Defence, is an Australian Government organisation that consists of the Australian Defence Force (ADF), the Department of Defence (the Department, DoD; occaisionally Defence Australia), and other related organisations. Defence's mission and purpose is "to defend Australia and its national interests in order to advance Australia’s security and prosperity".

== Organisation ==
Defence consists of several smaller interrelated military and corporate organisations. The two most significant organisations are the ADF, led by the Chief of the Defence Force, Australia's senior military leader, and the DoD, managed by the Secretary of the Department of Defence who is a senior public servant accountable under the Public Governance, Performance and Accountability Act 2013.

In addition to the two primary organisations, a number of other entities are considered part of Defence:

- The Australian Signals Directorate (ASD) is an independent statutory agency under the Intelligence Services Act 2001.
- The Australian Submarine Agency is a non-corporate Commonwealth entity under the DoD.
- Both the Inspector-General of the ADF and the Defence Honours and Awards Appeals Tribunal are independent statutory offices created by the Defence Act 1903 which operate within the DoD.
- Defence additionally contains a number of independent statutory offices created by the Defence Force Discipline Act 1982.
- Various other trusts and companies support the mission of defence, including the Australian Strategic Policy Institute, Defence Housing Australia and funds and trusts associated with branches of the ADF.

Entities within Defence report to the Minister for Defence, but the defence minster's portfolio and ADO are not identical, for example the Department of Veterans' Affairs reports to the defence minister but is not part of Defence.

For the 2024–25 financial year, as estimated in the Defence Portfolio Budget Statement prepared as part of the 2024 Australian federal budget, Defence's total workforce was 82,724 people (16,331 Navy personnel, 31,339 Army personnel, 15,927 Air Force personnel and 19,127 public servants), and Defence received A$53.58 billion in government funding.

The ADO is understood to be a diarchy, a rare organisational structure intended to take advantage of "the responsibilities and complementary abilities of public servants and military officials". The 2014 First Principles Review, taken up in the 2016 Defence White Paper, recommended moving to operate as a more integrated organisation, amid public criticism of the diarchy structure.

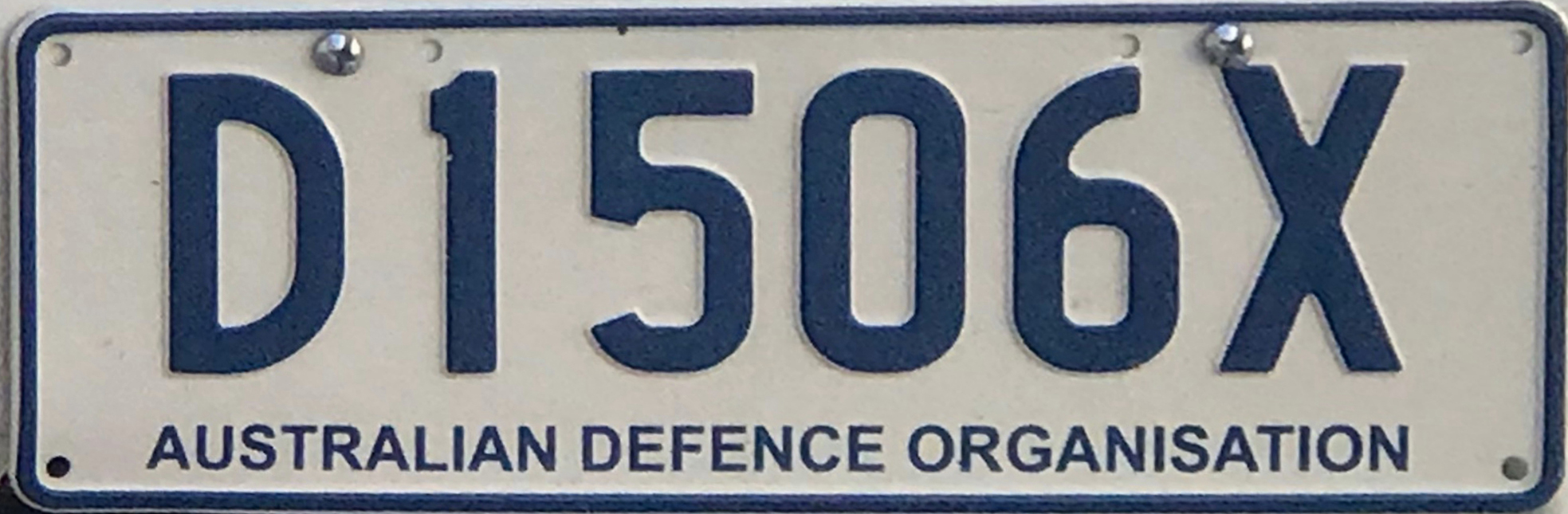

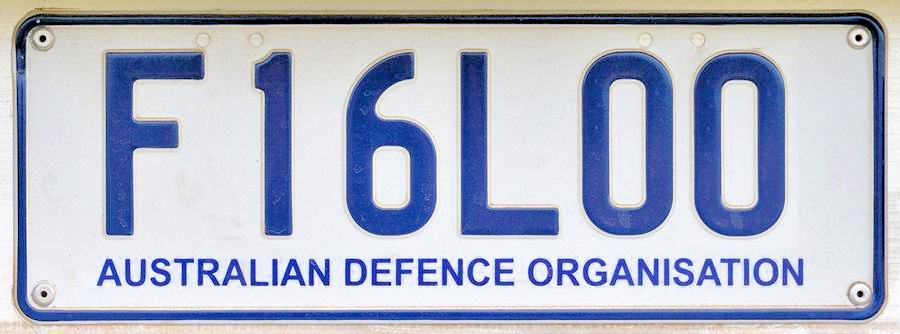
Examples of ADO number plates

While Defence is more commonly used, use of 'Australian Defence Organisation' to refer to the entities collectively is longstanding practice. For example, 'Australian Defence Organisation' can still be seen on the number plates of vehicles managed by the Australian Defence Organisation Commercial Vehicles Fleet, operated by the Australian Army.

== Australian Defence Force ==
The armed forces of Australia are the Australian Defence Force, consisting of three branches: the Royal Australian Navy, Australian Army and Royal Australian Air Force. Command of the Australian Defence Force, under the direction of Defence Minister, is the primary responsibility of the Chief of the Defence Force, currently Admiral David Johnston.

Reporting to the Chief of Defence Force are the Chief of Navy, Chief of Army, and Chief of Air Force. Each Chief manages the day-to-day executive operations of their branch with both discretionary decision making authority and direction from the Chief of the Defence Force and the various Ministers of the defence portfolio and often cooperate with their counterparts from the other services as well as the Department of Defence.

The Vice Chief of the Defence Force, currently Vice Air Marshal Robert Chipman, is responsible for joint force integration, preparedness and military strategy, interoperability, and designing the future force. The Joint Operations Command oversees all joint deployments of the Australian Defence Force and is commanded by the Chief of Joint Operations. The Joint Capabilities Group, commanded by the Chief of Joint Capabilities, provides joint military professional education and training, logistics support, health support and oversees the Joint Logistics Command, Joint Health Command, Australian Defence College, and the Information Warfare Division.

== Department of Defence ==
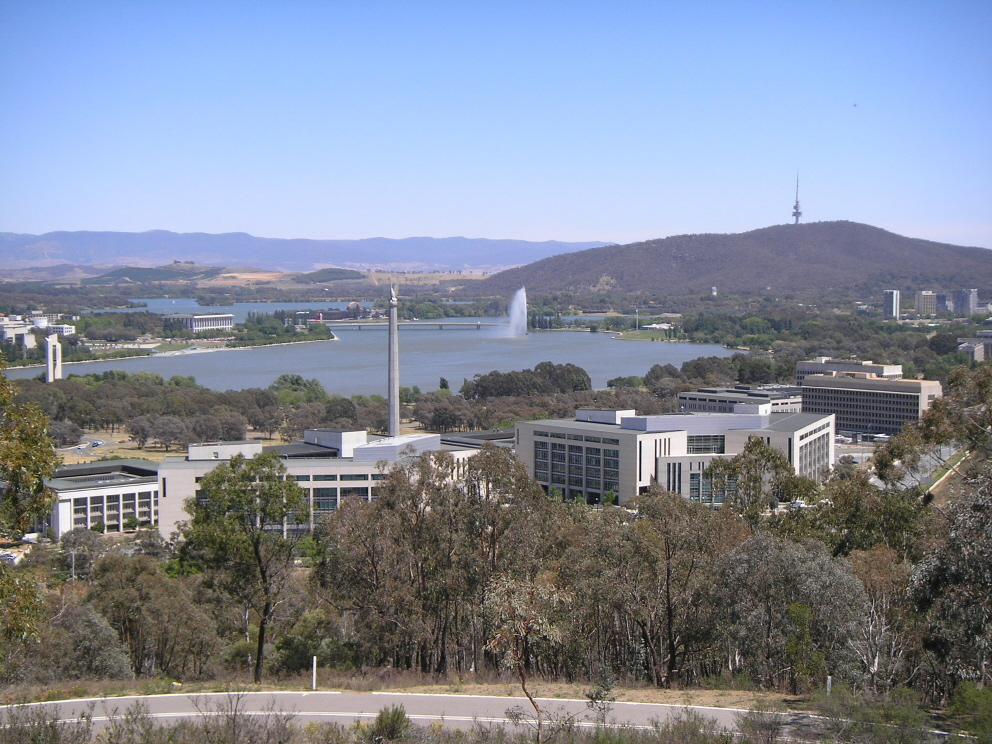
The main offices of the Department of Defence and the Australian Defence Force's administrative headquarters are located in the Russell Offices complex in Canberra

The Department of Defence is one of the three original Australian Government departments created at Federation of Australia in 1901, alongside the Attorney-General's Department and the Treasury. It is the Australian Public Service entity that provides advice, coordination, and program delivery for defence and military policy.

The Department of Defence also manages and oversees a range of public service and defence force agencies and organisations that deliver and develop the capabilities and services that support the Australian Defence Force. Such agencies include the Army and Air Force Canteen Service, the Defence Community Organisation, and Defence Housing Australia.

The department also includes key groups including the Capability Acquisition and Sustainment Group, the Defence Science and Technology Group, and the Defence Strategic Policy and Intelligence Group (which oversees the Australian Signals Directorate, Defence Intelligence Organisation, and Australian Geospatial-Intelligence Organisation).
