= Defence Estate and Infrastructure Group =

Organization within the Australian Department of Defense

Security and Estate Group
Agency overview
- Superseding agency: Defence Estate and Infrastructure Group
- Jurisdiction: Commonwealth of Australia
- Headquarters: Russell, Canberra, Australia
- Employees: 2100 civilian, 550 military
- Annual budget: $3 billion
- Minister responsible: Pat Conroy, Minister for Defence Industry
- Agency executive: Celia Perkins, Deputy Secretary
- Parent agency: Department of Defence (Australia)
- Website: https://www.defence.gov.au/about/who-we-are/organisation-structure/security-estate-group

The Defence Security and Estate Group (abbreviated as SEG) is the infrastructure and service delivery organisation of the Australian Department of Defence responsible for environmental stewardship, land management and facilities maintenance of the Australian Defence Force. The Group is led by the Deputy Secretary for Security and Estate.

== History ==
The agency's name was changed from Defence Support and Reform Group (DSRG) to Defence Estate and Infrastructure Group on 1 July 2015, and later to the Security and Estate Group.

== Role and responsibilities ==
The Security and Estate Group, which oversees a budget in excess of $3 billion, with an asset base with a gross replacement value in excess of $62 billion and around 2,100 civilian and 550 military staff. The Security and Estate Group also maintains environmental stewardship of over 3 million hectares of land with more than 300 managed properties and maintains and operates more than 25,000 buildings.

== Organisational structure ==
=== Infrastructure Division ===
- Capital Facilities and Infrastructure Branch
- Environment and Engineering Branch
- Estate Planning Branch
- Property Management Branch

=== Service Delivery Division ===
- Regional Services Branch
- Estate Service Delivery Branch
- Service Delivery Program Management and Governance Branch

== See also ==
- Department of Infrastructure, Regional Development and Cities
