= Andrew Shearer (public servant) =

Australian public servant

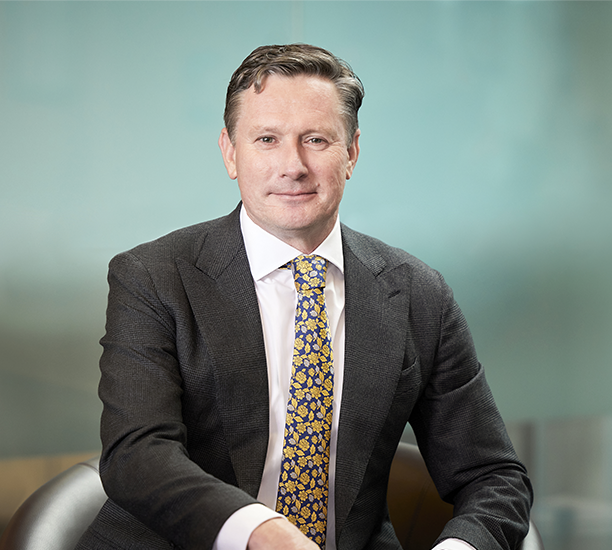
- Employer: Office of National Intelligence

Andrew Shearer is an Australian government official served as director general of the Office of National Intelligence from 2020 to 2026. He previously served as department secretary in the Department of the Prime Minister and Cabinet and as national security adviser to prime ministers John Howard and Tony Abbott.

Following the expiration of Shearer's term at the Office of National Intelligence, he was replaced by Kathy Klugman.

Shearer studied law at the University of Melbourne and received a Master of Philosophy degree in international relations from the University of Cambridge.

In October 2025, Shearer was nominated by the government to become the next Australian Ambassador to Japan.
