= Royal Commission on Intelligence and Security =

Australian government agency

The Royal Commission on Intelligence and Security (RCIS), also known as the First Hope Commission, was a Royal Commission established on 21 August 1974 by Prime Minister of Australia Gough Whitlam to reach findings and make recommendations as to the Australian Intelligence Community.

The commission was conducted by Justice Robert Hope of the NSW Court of Appeal. It concluded its work in 1977, although the reports were gradually handed down from 1975 under Prime Minister Malcolm Fraser.

== Background ==
=== Policy development ===
The Australian Labor Party had come to power in 1972 after over two decades of Liberal Party of Australia rule. Despite having created the Australian Security Intelligence Organisation (ASIO) in 1949, the subsequent actions of the organisation contributed to Labor's long period out of office. One of the first acts of the new Whitlam government was to help US-led efforts in the United Nations General Assembly to combat global terrorism, which had recently gained prominence with the 1972 Munich Olympics and the Croatian nationalist bombings in Sydney. Both Whitlam and Attorney-General Lionel Murphy, emulating President Richard Nixon, stressed that terrorists would be hunted and political violence either to person or property would not be tolerated either inside or outside Australia.

During its first term (1972-1974) the government quickly became embroiled in a political scandal known as the 1973 Murphy raids, in which Murphy suddenly demanded entry to the ASIO headquarters in Melbourne and the Canberra office, after the press had been alerted. The government's inability to justify the raids in Parliament and ASIO's own response - leaking documents which contradicted the prime minister's account - "rendered the reform of the intelligence community both politically untouchable and urgent".

In September 1973, Whitlam publicly indicated that an inquiry into ASIO of some kind would be instigated. Labor took the policy of establishing a judicial inquiry to the 1974 election as part of its policy platform. It was not until the controversial leak of the 'Cairns dossier' (ASIO's view of Deputy Prime Minister Jim Cairns) in June 1974 - although the leak probably occurred much earlier in April 1973 - that an inquiry was called.

=== Terms of reference ===
The Governor-General commissioned Justice Robert Marsden Hope on 21 August 1974 on the advice of Whitlam and Murphy. The terms of reference were made public by Whitlam in a press release on the same day. The most important part of the terms of reference, as Whitlam argued in 1985, was:

In the light of past experience, and having regard to the security of Australia as a nation, the rights and responsibilities of individual persons and future as well as present needs, to make recommendations on the intelligence and security services which the nation should have available to it and on the way in which the relevant organisations can most efficiently and effectively serve the interest of the Australian people and Government...

=== Abolition of ASIO ===
The second volume of the Official History of ASIO, edited by David Horner and written by John Blaxland, suggests the Royal Commission could have brought ASIO to an end. However, this has since been argued to be incorrect as the Whitlam government had no intention of disbanding or abolishing ASIO:

The Royal Commission began a process of reform that consciously depoliticised ASIO, brought it into line with the established practises of the bureaucracy, and refocused it on tangible threats posed to the state. However, the selection of royal commissioner and the terms of reference prevented the Royal Commission from reaching radical conclusions, especially the disbandment of ASIO.

Labor had rejected the policy of abolishment at its 1971 and 1973 conferences. As the US State Department observed secretly, "Seems clear [Whitlam] has no intention of abolishing... He will eventually be able to say that he has had a careful inquiry... and might make some organizational or personnel changes."

== Reports ==
The Hope Royal Commission delivered eight reports, four of which were tabled in Parliament on 5 May 1977 and 25 October 1977.

=== Findings ===
With regards to ASIO, Hope found that its existence was legally, philosophically and practically legitimate. Despite being directed by the terms of reference to examine the history of ASIO, Hope declined:

I found ASIO’s files in such disorder that, in the time that has been available to me, I have been quite unable to establish the truth or otherwise of many of the particulars of matter alleged in evidence, or raised with ASIO as the result of other inquiries. I have taken the view, however, that my task is to make recommendations for the future rather than to seek to track down the truth or otherwise of past errors or alleged past errors.

In his report, Hope asserted that Australia's intelligence agencies were too close to those in the UK and the US, as part of the five-nation UKUSA Agreement (commonly called Five Eyes).

=== Recommendations ===
Hope made many recommendations. With regards to ASIO, Hope wanted it to become truly part of the defence forces of Australia and celebrated as such:

An organisation truly fulfilling [“the defence of the realm”]... is entitled to the confidence and respect of the nation. It is only in performing such a role that ASIO will be able to attain a standing comparable with that of the various defence services. My recommendations will be directed to this end."

Hope recommended that ASIO should continue to be overseen by the Executive (Australian Government) as opposed to Parliament and that the organisation be routinely reviewed to ensure its operational efficacy.

=== Implementation ===
Results from the other reports included the establishment of the Office of National Assessments (ONA) as a statutory body independent from government with the passage of the Office of National Assessments Act 1977, and the reform of ASIO by the Australian Security Intelligence Organisation Act 1979. ONA reported directly to the Prime Minister to provide foreign intelligence assessments on political, strategic and economic issues. ONA began operations on 20 February 1978, and assumed the Joint Intelligence Organisation's foreign intelligence assessment role. The Joint Intelligence Organisation retained its defence intelligence assessment role until it was restructured as the Defence Intelligence Organisation in 1990.

The Defence Signals Division was renamed Defence Signals Directorate.

Aside from the observation that ASIS was 'singularly well run and well managed', the report(s) on ASIS were not released, but on 25 October 1977, Fraser publicly announced the existence of ASIS and its functions on the Commission's recommendation.

== Top secret and undisclosed aspects ==
In a top secret supplement to the report on ASIO Hope stated his suspicion that ASIO had been "penetrated by a hostile intelligence agency" that had succeeded in making the organisation ineffective. He shared the belief of US and UK intelligence agencies that ASIO was fundamentally compromised and that this was part of a global trend or "grand design", possibly referring to the leak of the FBI's COINTELPRO.

In 1998, Hope conducted an interview with the National Library of Australia to be released after his death. In the interview Hope revealed a number of controversial things. According to Hope, the Whitlam government had used Pine Gap to spy on Japanese delegates during 1973 trade negotiations. This was the first of many such instances. By the time of the Second Hope Commission in the 1980s he found the exploitation of Pine Gap had changed and that the Hawke government was handing raw intelligence to major Australian corporations. He said he found ASIO to be dominated by conservatives who were fanatical about the Cold War and that "the whole system was substantially directed to the left wing of politics”. He found that ASIO was "deliberately designed to shield the organisation from external (and internal) scrutiny".

The Secretary of the Department of Defence, Arthur Tange controversially ordered that the Commission "should not be told too much" because this would put the Five Eyes alliance in jeopardy. As a result, the Commission was not granted access to the satellite tracking station at Pine Gap.

== Release of commission papers ==
On 27 May 2008, the records of the commission were partly released to the public. As of 2014, many declassified documents authored by the commission remain redacted.

== See also ==
- Church Committee
- Watergate scandal
