= Department of Defence (Australia) =

Federal department of the Australian Government

- Logo of the Department of Defence

Department overview
- Formed: 14 April 1942
- Preceding department: Department of Defence Co-ordination
- Jurisdiction: Australia
- Headquarters: Canberra
- Employees: 16,272 (2020)
- Annual budget: A$37.82 billion (2019–20)
- Minister responsible: Richard Marles, Minister for Defence
- Department executive: Meghan Quinn PSM, Secretary of the Department of Defence
- Child agencies: Defence Intelligence Organisation; Australian Geospatial-Intelligence Organisation; Australian Signals Directorate; Australian Submarine Agency
- Website: defence.gov.au

The Department of Defence is the department of the Australian Government responsible for national defence policy, supporting the Australian Defence Force (ADF) and ensuring the overall defence of Australia and its national interests. Along with the ADF and other agencies, it forms part of the Australian Defence Organisation (ADO). The Department is accountable to the Parliament of Australia, on behalf of the Australian people, for its spending of public funds and implementation of government policy. Defence staff are primarily based out of the Russell Offices and Campbell Park Offices in Canberra, in the Australian Capital Territory.

The executive head of the department, who leads it on a day-to-day basis, independent of a change in government, is the Secretary of the Department of Defence (SECDEF), currently Meghan Quinn PSM. SECDEF reports to the Minister for Defence, currently Richard Marles.

== History ==
Australia has had at least one defence-related government department since Federation in 1901. The first Department of Defence existed from 1901 until 1921. In 1915, during World War I, a separate Department of the Navy was created. The two departments merged in 1921 to form the second Department of Defence, regarded as a separate body.

A major departmental reorganisation occurred in the lead-up to World War II. The Department of Defence was abolished and replaced with six smaller departments – the Defence Co-ordination (for defence policy, financial, and administrative matters), three "service departments" (Army, Navy, and Air), the Supply and Development (for munitions and materiel), and Civil Aviation. The current Department of Defence was formally created in 1942, when Prime Minister John Curtin renamed the previous Department of Defence Co-ordination. The other defence-related departments underwent a series of reorganisations, before being merged into the primary department over the following decades. This culminated in the abolition of the three service departments in 1973. A new Department of Defence Support was created in 1982, but abolished in 1984.

In May 2022, The Canberra Times reported that department had been renamed Defence Australia. However, the department's corporate documents continue to refer to it as the Department of Defence.

The Australian Department of Defence, along with Australian state and other governments, partially fund the Australian Strategic Policy Institute (ASPI), a defence and strategic policy think tank also based in Canberra, Australian Capital Territory.

== Defence Committee ==
The Defence Committee is the primary decision-making committee in the Department of Defence. It is supported by six subordinate committees, groups and boards. The Defence Committee is focused on major capability development and resource management for the Australian Defence Organisation and shared accountabilities of the Secretary and the Chief of the Defence Force.

The members of the Defence Committee are:

- Secretary of the Department of Defence (SECDEF)
- Chief of the Defence Force (CDF)
- Vice Chief of the Defence Force (VCDF)
- Associate Secretary
- Chief of Navy (CN)
- Chief of Army (CA)
- Chief of Air Force (CAF)
- Chief of Joint Operations (CJOPS)
- Deputy Secretary for Capability Acquisition and Sustainment
- Deputy Secretary for Strategic Policy and Intelligence
- Chief Defence Scientist (CDS)
- Chief of Joint Capabilities (CJC)
- Chief Finance Officer (CFO)
- Deputy Secretary for People
- Deputy Secretary for Estate and Infrastructure
- Chief Information Officer (CIO)

== Organisational groups ==
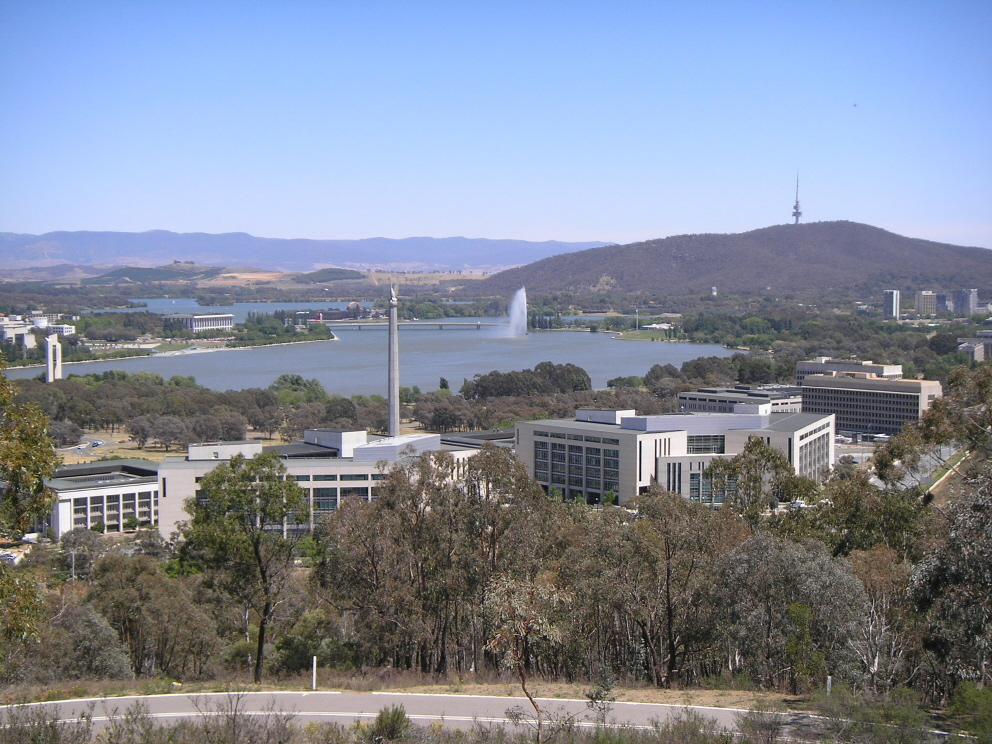
Department headquarters at the Russell Offices complex in Canberra

As of 2016, the Department of Defence consists of ten major organisational groups:

- Associate Secretary Group – provides administrative, legal and governance services including audit and fraud control, security and vetting, the Judge Advocate General, and communications and ministerial support.
- Chief Information Officer Group – leads the integrated design, cost effective delivery, and sustained operation of Defence information
- Chief Finance Officer Group – to drive the financial and management improvement programs for Defence
- Capability Acquisition and Sustainment Group (CASG) – Australia's largest project management organisation and its mission is to acquire and sustain equipment for the Australian Defence Force, created through the amalgamation of the Capability Development Group and Defence Materiel Organisation in 2015.
- Defence People Group – human resource outcomes across the Defence employment cycle from strategy and policy development, through to implementation and service delivery
- Defence Estate and Infrastructure Group – consolidated service delivery organisation for Defence that enables Defence capability by working in partnership to deliver integrated services through a highly capable workforce
- Defence Science and Technology Group – lead agency charged with applying science and technology to protect and defend Australia and its national interests
- Defence Strategic Policy and Intelligence Group – provides policy advice and coordination for strategy and intelligence for Defence, including overseeing the Defence Intelligence Organisation, Australian Signals Directorate, and the Australian Geospatial-Intelligence Organisation

== Diarchy ==
The Chief of the Defence Force (CDF) and the Secretary of the Department of Defence (SECDEF) jointly manage the Australian Defence Organisation (ADO) under a diarchy in which both report directly to the Minister for Defence and the Assistant Minister for Defence. The ADO diarchy is a governance structure unique in the Australian Public Service.

== List of departmental secretaries ==
The Secretary of the Department of Defence (SECDEF) is a senior public service officer and historically the appointees have not come from military service.

| Name | Post-nominlal's | Date appointment commenced | Date appointment ceased | Term in office | Notes | Ref(s) |
|---|---|---|---|---|---|---|
| Captain Sir Muirhead Collins | KCMG, PVNF | 1901 | 1910 | 9 years, 0 days | Pethebridge was acting Secretary 1906–1910 | |
| Brigadier General Sir Samuel Pethebridge | KCMG | 1910 | 1918 | 8 years, 0 days | Trumble was acting Secretary 1914–1918 | |
| Thomas Trumble | CMG, CBE | 1918 | 1927 | 9 years, 0 days | | |
| Malcolm Shepherd | CMG, ISO | 1927 | 1937 | 10 years, 0 days | | |
| Sir Frederick Shedden | KCMG, OBE | 1937 | 1956 | 19 years, 301 days | | |
| Sir Edwin Hicks | CBE | 28 October 1956 | 5 January 1968 | 11 years, 69 days | | |
| Sir Henry Bland | | 1 May 1968 | 1970 | 1 year, 361 days | | |
| Sir Arthur Tange | AC, CBE | March 1970 | August 1979 | 9 years, 92 days | | |
| Bill Pritchett | AO | August 1979 | 6 February 1984 | 4 years, 189 days | | |
| Sir William Cole | | 6 February 1984 | 15 October 1986 | 2 years, 251 days | | |
| Alan Woods | AC | December 1986 | 31 July 1988 | 1 year, 243 days | | |
| Tony Ayers | AC | 1 August 1988 | February 1998 | 9 years, 184 days | | |
| Paul Barratt | AO | February 1998 | 31 August 1999 | 1 year, 211 days | Appointment terminated by the Governor-General on the recommendation of Prime Minister Howard. Barratt fought the decision in the Federal Court, losing on appeal. | |
| Dr Allan Hawke | AC | 21 October 1999 | 20 October 2002 | 2 years, 364 days | | |
| Ric Smith | AO, PSM | 11 November 2002 | 3 December 2006 | 4 years, 22 days | | |
| Nick Warner | AO, PSM | 4 December 2006 | 13 August 2009 | 2 years, 252 days | | |
| Dr Ian Watt | AO | 13 August 2009 | 5 September 2011 | 2 years, 23 days | | |
| Major General Duncan Lewis | AO, DSC, CSC | 5 September 2011 | 18 October 2012 | 1 year, 43 days | | |
| Dennis Richardson | AO | 18 October 2012 | 12 May 2017 | 4 years, 206 days | | |
| Greg Moriarty | AO | 4 September 2017 | 1 April 2026 | 8 years, 356 days | | |

== See also ==
- Australian Defence Organisation
- Current senior Australian Defence Organisation personnel
- Minister for Defence
- Minister for Defence Science and Personnel
- Minister for Veterans' Affairs
- Minister for Defence Industry
- List of Australian Commonwealth Government entities
- Department of the Army (Australia)
- Department of the Navy (Australia)
- Department of Air (Australia)
- United States Department of Defense
- United Kingdom Ministry of Defence
- Canadian Department of National Defence
- New Zealand Ministry of Defence
