= Robert Marsden Hope =

Former Justice of the New South Wales Court of Appeal (1919 – 1999)

The Hon. Justice Robert Marsden Hope AC CMG, LLB (Syd) QC

Judge of Appeal of the New South Wales Supreme Court
- In office 1972–1989

Judge of the New South Wales Supreme Court
- In office 1969–1972

Royal Commissioner on Australia's Security and Intelligence Agencies
- In office 17 May 1983 – 22 May 1985
- Appointed by: Prime Minister Bob Hawke

Royal Commissioner on Intelligence and Security
- In office 21 August 1974 – 25 October 1977
- Appointed by: Prime Minister Gough Whitlam

Royal Commissioner into the National Estate
- In office 1973–1974
- Appointed by: Prime Minister Gough Whitlam

Personal details
- Born: 24 July 1919
- Died: 12 October 1999 (aged 80)
- Spouse: June Hope
- Profession: Barrister and Judge

Robert Marsden Hope, AC CMG QC (24 July 1919 – 12 October 1999) was a Justice of the New South Wales Court of Appeal and Royal Commissioner on three occasions, most notably the Royal Commission on Intelligence and Security. As a judge Hope was known for his legal positivism and as a royal commissioner he "instilled a sense of impartiality".

== Career ==
Justice Hope received his Bachelor of Laws from the University of Sydney before being called to the New South Wales Bar on 26 October 1945. During his time at university he had attempted to join the Communist Party of Australia but due to "administrative incompetence" he had failed to do so.

By his own admission in 1998, the 1960s had brought Hope considerable professional success owing to his strategic decision to join the Liberal Party of Australia. Hope was appointed a Queen's Counsel in 1960. He became President of the NSW Council of Civil Liberties "but within weeks" he was then appointed Justice of the New South Wales Supreme Court. Hope was finally made a Justice of Appeal of the Supreme Court, the highest court in the New South Wales judiciary system in 1972, a position he held until his retirement in 1989. He also acknowledged that on two occasions he had allowed himself to be pressured by President Athol Moffitt into reaching decisions "he would have otherwise not made".

Justice Hope was appointed to the Australian Council for the Arts in 1974 and awarded the honour of Companion of the Order of St Michael and St George (CMG) in 1977. In 1989 he was made a Companion of the Order of Australia (AC), Australia's highest civilian honour. Hope was known as a "university senator and chancellor, a patron and promoter of the performing arts, (and) a civil libertarian". He held a seat on the Senate of the University of Sydney from 1970 till 1975 when he became the first Chancellor of the University of Wollongong, a position he held until 1997. Hope was the Chairman of the New South Wales Heritage Council from 1978 to 1993 and was also the Chairman of the Law Reform Commission from 1990 to 1993.

=== Death ===
Hope died in 1999 at the age of 80. After his death, the University of Wollongong awarded him an honorary Doctorate in Law. He was survived by his wife, June Hope. In 2002, a park in the Northern Canberra suburb of Watson was named in his honour in recognition of his (unrealised) environmental work. The park is known for its biodiversity. In 2011 the Patent Office Building in Canberra was renamed the Robert Marsden Hope Building in recognition of his achievements.

== Royal commissions and inquiries ==
=== National Estate (cultural heritage and environment) ===
In 1973, Hope was appointed the head commissioner in National Estate Committee of Inquiry (1973–1974). This commission dealt with Australia's cultural heritage, both architectural and environmental. Its findings formed the backbone of the Whitlam government's heritage and environmental agenda although its landmark recommendations were never realised.

=== Australian Intelligence Community ===
In 1974, Prime Minister Gough Whitlam appointed Justice Hope to head the Royal Commission on Intelligence and Security (RCIS). Completed in 1977, Hope's recommendations – most of which had been pre-empted by the Whitlam government – would secure the new bipartisan support for the Australian Security Intelligence Organisation (ASIO). Later, in 1998, Hope revealed that he regretted a number of his core recommendations and that he found ASIO to be a highly partisan and incompetent organisation.

Hope was again commissioned only a year later in 1978 to conduct the Protective Security Review (PSR) into protective security arrangements for the Commonwealth as well as co-operation between national and state cooperation on protective security following the bombing of the Hilton Hotel in Sydney during the Commonwealth Heads of Government Regional Meeting (CHOGRM). While the review nominally targeted "protective security", it was the threat of international terrorism in Australia that was at the heart of Prime Minister Malcolm Fraser's decision to use Hope's experience in the area of Australia's intelligence services. When completed in 1979, the review essentially ended up probing, "in a broad sense, terrorism possibilities in Australia, and ways, and means of State, Territory and Commonwealth co-operation in dealing with the threat of terror". Again as a direct result of his recommendations, government policy on intelligence and security changed. Hope designated ASIO as the agency responsible for producing national threat assessments in the field of terrorism and politically motivated violence and at the end of 1979, a new ASIO Act came into being which implemented many of Hope's recommendations from the RCIS and the PSR. At the same time, the Security Appeals Tribunal, another of Hope's RCIS recommendations, was bought into being.

In 1983, the Hawke government requested that Hope once again become commissioner for the Royal Commission into Australia's Security and Intelligence Agencies. Soon after this request was made the government became embroiled in the Combe-Ivanov affair, which involved an expelled Soviet agent, Valery Ivanov, who had been the First Secretary for the Soviet Embassy. The publicity surrounding the affair saw the Hawke Government commission Hope again to look into intelligence issues. Hope completed the Royal Commission into Australia's Security and Intelligence Agencies (RCASIA) in 1984 and made a range of logical and basic recommendations (in terms of the evolution of policies of the time) that again altered the parameters that Australia's intelligence agencies operated under and bought them into the political and cultural paradigms of the 1980s. One of Justice Hope's RCASIA recommendations was that "the ASIO Act expressly provide that it is not the purpose of the Act that the right of lawful advocacy, protest or dissent should be affected or that exercising those rights should, by themselves, constitute activity prejudicial to security". This recommendation was important from a cultural aspect in the sense that it effectively removed security agencies from suppression of civil protest and dissent in Australia. He also recommended the creation of the office of Inspector-General of Intelligence and Security to oversee and hold accountable the various agencies. As if to highlight the need for such a position, only the same year RCASIA was commissioned, the Security Appeals Tribunal ruled in a case against ASIO where they had given an unfavourable security assessment on a member of the Australian Communist Party, that "membership of the Communist Party of Australia did not warrant a recommendation against the grant of access to classified national security material (such as required by their job – Ed.). A nexus between the applicant and particular activities of security interest needed to be shown" – all very much in keeping with Hope's civil libertarian position and a marker of where the Australian intelligence and security agencies saw their priorities in the pre-Hilton Bombing environment.

In 1986 the ASIO Act was amended to take into consideration the recommendations of Hope in the RCASIA.

== Sources ==
New South Wales Attorney General's Department (2004). "HOPE – Robert Marsden – Law Reform Commission : Lawlink NSW". Lawlink NSW website. New South Wales Attorney General's Department.

The University of Wollongong (2006). "University of Wollongong – Honorary Graduates, Emeritus Professors and Fellows" (PDF). The University of Wollongong. Archived from the original (PDF) on 29 May 2008.

Crown, James (1986). Australia: The Terrorist Connection. Melbourne: Sun Books – The Macmillan Company of Australia. pp. 18–19. 0-725-10508-9.

The Commonwealth of Australia (2008). "Significant events in ASIO's history". The Australian Security Intelligence Organisation Website. eDIME Internet Agency. Archived from the original on 13 October 2007.

The Commonwealth of Australia (2007). "Australian Security Intelligence Organisation Act 1979 (2007)" (PDF). ComLaw – Commonwealth of Australia Law Website.

The Commonwealth of Australia (2006). "ASIO Speeches – 11 September five years later: Where to from here?". Australian Security Intelligence Organisation Website. eDIME Internet Agency.

The University of Wollongong (2002). "Robert Hope scholarship launched". The University of Wollongong Website News Archives. The University of Wollongong News and Media Unit. Archived from the original on 3 September 2007.

The University of Sydney (2008). "The University of Sydney Senate Website". The University of Sydney Website. The University of Sydney.

Academic offices
New title	Chancellor of the University of Wollongong; 1975 – 1996	Succeeded by Mike Codd
