= Defence Intelligence Organisation =

Australian military intelligence agency

Agency overview
- Formed: 1990; 36 years ago
- Preceding agencies: Joint Intelligence Organisation; Joint Intelligence Bureau
- Headquarters: Russell Offices, Canberra
- Agency executives: Lieutenant General Gavan Reynolds, Chief of Defence Intelligence; Major General Matthew Hall, Director of the Defence Intelligence Organisation
- Parent agency: Defence Intelligence Group
- Website: defence.gov.au/dio/

The Defence Intelligence Organisation (DIO) is an Australian government military intelligence agency responsible for strategic intelligence and technical intelligence assessments, advising defence and government decision-making on national security and international security issues, and the planning and conduct of Australian Defence Force operations. The DIO does not collect intelligence or conduct covert action, but works on defence economics, transnational terrorism, and WMD.

The DIO is an agency of the Australian Intelligence Community and is part of the Defence Intelligence Group (DIG) with the Australian Geospatial-Intelligence Organisation (AGO). The head of the DIO is the Chief of Defense Intelligence, currently Tom Hamilton.

== History ==
=== Joint Intelligence Bureau ===
In the post-World War II period, the military intelligence and strategic assessments functions were shared between the Navy, Army and Air Force intelligence directorates and the Joint Intelligence Bureau (JIB) from 1947 to 1969. JIB was responsible for geographic, infrastructure and economic intelligence – mainly in Australia's region. In 1957, JIB's responsibilities were expanded to include scientific and technical intelligence.

=== Joint Intelligence Organisation ===
In 1969, most of the foreign assessment elements of the three armed services were merged to form the Joint Intelligence Organisation (JIO). The Royal Commission on Intelligence and Security (also called the first Hope Commission) in 1977 recommended the establishment of the Office of National Assessments (ONA) as an independent statutory agency to provide all-source assessments on international political, strategic and economic developments to the Prime Minister and to assume the foreign intelligence assessment role of JIO. JIO was then reoriented to focus more closely on defence intelligence and strategic interests. The second Hope Commission endorsed these arrangements in 1984. In 1989, counterterrorism was added to JIO's responsibilities.

=== Defence Intelligence Group ===
On the 1st of September 2020, following the Defence Intelligence Review of 2019–2020, the Defence Intelligence Group (DIG) was created, folding the DIO in as one of its divisions. The DIG reports to the Chief of Defence Intelligence; a position which is now also the head of the DIO.

== Overview ==
A review of Defence intelligence in 1989 by Major General John Baker led to the establishment in 1990 of the Defence Intelligence Organisation (DIO) as the sole strategic level, all-source intelligence assessment agency for the Department of Defence. Baker became the first Director of DIO in 1990 until 1992.

DIO is the strategic-level, all-source intelligence assessment agency for the Department of Defence. It is not an autonomous body; unlike ONA, DIO is a subordinate organisation within the Department of Defence with no separate statutory mandate or direct budget line. The organisation's character and purpose is defined by its position within the Defence portfolio.

DIO is an integrated civilian–military organisation, with the majority of staff being public servants recruited through either the defence graduate program or direct entry.

== Operations ==
DIO's assessments focus on the Asia-Pacific region and cover strategic, political, defence, military, economic, scientific and technical areas. DIO's intelligence products help inform decisions about Australia's military activities at home and abroad, defence acquisition processes, force readiness decisions, strategic policy, international relations and defence scientific developments.

DIO also maintains close links with intelligence agencies of other allied countries. In addition, it maintains links with intelligence agencies of a range of other countries to foster dialogue and the exchange of information and as a contribution to defence relationships with regional countries.

Australian troops deploying to Afghanistan and Iraq were briefed by DIO on enemy weapons and forces.

== Directors ==
The position of Director of the Defence Intelligence Organisation is a two-star rank position.

Title/Rank	Name	Postnominals	Term
Director Joint Intelligence Bureau
Mr	Allan Fleming	CBE	1947–1949
Commander	Arthur Storey	DSC	1949–1952
Major General	Sir Walter Cawthorn	CB, CIE, CBE	1952–1954
Mr	W. Harold King	MBE	1954–1968
Mr	Arthur McMichael	OBE	1968–1969
Director Joint Intelligence Organisation
Mr	Robert Furlonger	CB	1969–1972
Mr	Gordon Jockel	CBE	1972–1978
Mr	Arthur McMichael	OBE	1978–1982
Mr	Jim Furner	CBE	1982–1984
Mr	G.R. Marshall		1984–1987
Dr	Paul Dibb		1987–1988
Major General	John Baker	AO	1989–1990
Director Defence Intelligence Organisation
Major General	John Baker	AO	1990–1992
Major General	John Hartley	AO	1992–1995
Major General	James Connolly	AO	1995–1996
Major General	William Crews	AO	1997–1999
Mr	Frank Lewincamp	PSM	1999–2005
Major General	Maurie McNarn	AO	2005–2009
Major General	Richard Wilson	AO	2009–2011
Major General	Paul Symon	AO	2011–2014
Air Vice Marshal	John McGarry	AM, CSC	2014–2016
Major General	Matthew Hall	AO, CSC	2017 – before 1 September 2020
Chief of Defence Intelligence
Lieutenant General	Gavan Reynolds	AO	2020–2024
Mr	Tom Hamilton		2024–present

== See also ==
- Australian Intelligence Community
- Australian Signals Directorate
- Australian Security Intelligence Organisation
