= Australian Geospatial-Intelligence Organisation =

Geo-spatial intelligence organisation within the Australian Department of Defence

Agency overview
- Formed: 2000; 26 years ago (as Defence Imagery and Geospatial Organisation)
- Preceding agencies: Australian Imagery Organisation; Directorate of Strategic Military Geographic Information; Defence Topographic Agency
- Jurisdiction: Australia
- Headquarters: Russell Offices, Russell, Canberra, ACT
- Minister responsible: Richard Marles, Minister for Defence
- Agency executives: Lieutenant General Gavan Reynolds AM, Chief of Defence Intelligence; Scott Dewar, Director
- Parent agency: Defence Intelligence Group
- Website: defence.gov.au/AGO/

The Australian Geospatial-Intelligence Organisation (AGO) is an Australian government intelligence agency that is part of the Department of Defence responsible for the collection, analysis, and distribution of geospatial intelligence (GEOINT) in support of Australia's defence and national interests. The AGO is one of six agencies that form the Australian Intelligence Community.

== History ==
Defence Imagery and Geospatial Organisation (DIGO) was originally formed in 2000 when the Australian Imagery Organisation, the Defence Topographic Agency and the Directorate of Strategic Military Geographic Information were brought together to form the DIGO.

DIGO was renamed Australian Geospatial-Intelligence Organisation (AGO) on 3 May 2013. AGO is part of the Australian Department of Defence.

== Operations ==
During 2014, the AGO assisted in the search for the remains of Malaysia Airlines Flight 370.

The operations of the agency are subject to independent statutory oversight by the Inspector-General of Intelligence and Security.
