= Senior Australian Defence Organisation Positions =

The Australian Defence Organisation (ADO) is composed of the armed forces of the Commonwealth of Australia, the Australian Defence Force (ADF), and the Australian Public Service government department, the Department of Defence which is composed of a range of civilian support organisations.

The Chief of the Defence Force (CDF) leads the Australian Defence Force and the Secretary of Defence leads the Department of Defence though both jointly manage the Australian Defence Organisation under a diarchy, and both report directly to the Minister for Defence.

The highest active rank in the Australian Defence Force is reserved for the Chief of the Defence Force. This is a four-star rank and the CDF is the only Australian military officer at that level. As a result of the diarchy, the Secretary of the Department of Defence is of the equivalent civilian four-starlevel in the Senior Executive Service of the Australian Public Service.

== Command and Control ==
The Commander-in-Chief of the Australian Defence Force is set out under Section 68 of the Constitution of Australia, stating "the command in chief of the naval and military forces of the Commonwealth is vested in the Governor-General as the Queen's representative". In practice, the Governor-General is the ceremonial head of the Australian Defence Force and command and control power is delegated to the Prime Minister and the Minister for Defence. The National Security Committee of Cabinet also plays an important role in the strategic direction of the Australian Defence Organisation including directing overseas deployments and going to war.

== Five-star level ==
Currently the five-star level is not an active serving rank in the Australian Defence Force. The first holder of this rank was William Birdwood, who was appointed as Field Marshal on 20 March 1925. George VI was appointed Marshal of the Royal Australian Air Force, maintaining the rank from 2 June 1939 until his death on 6 February 1952. Also, Prince Philip maintains the ranks of Field Marshal, Admiral of the Fleet, and Marshal of the Royal Australian Air Force. He was appointed to each rank on 2 April 1954. Australia has only had one active serving five-star rank officer within the armed forces of the Commonwealth of Australia, Thomas Blamey, who was appointed Field Marshal in the Australian Army in June 1950. He was presented his field marshal's baton by the then Governor-General William McKell in hospital that September, and Blamey, who was seriously ill at the time, died in May 1951.

== Four-star level ==
In the Australian Defence Force, guided by the Defence Force Regulations 1952, the level of four-star rank is that of commissioned officer O-10 in the Australian Defence Force ranks code. This means the Australian Army rank of general, the Royal Australian Navy rank of admiral, and the Royal Australian Air Force rank of air chief marshal.

In the Australian Public Service, guided by the Public Service Act 1999, the level of four-star rank is the equivalent civilian level of Senior Executive Service Band 4, which is styled as secretary with the leadership of a department.

- Chief of the Defence Force (CDF)
- Secretary of Defence (SECDEF)
- Director-General of the Australian Signals Directorate (DGASD)

== Three-star level ==
In the Australian Defence Force, guided by the Defence Force Regulations 1952, the level of three-star rank is that of commissioned officer O-9 in the Australian Defence Force ranks code. This means the Australian Army rank of lieutenant general, the Royal Australian Navy rank of vice admiral, and the Royal Australian Air Force rank of air marshal.

In the Australian Public Service, guided by the Public Service Act 1999, the level of three-star rank is the equivalent civilian level of Senior Executive Service Band 3, which is styled as associate secretary or deputy secretary (DEPSEC) or a chief portfolio officer, with the leadership of a group or agency.

=== Australian Defence Force ===
- Vice Chief of the Defence Force (VCDF)
- Chief of Navy (CN)
- Chief of Army (CA)
- Chief of Air Force (CAF)
- Chief of Joint Operations (CJOPS)
- Chief of Joint Capabilities (CJC)
- Chief of Defence Intelligence (CDI)

=== Department of Defence ===
- Associate Secretary of the Department of Defence
- Deputy Secretary for Strategy, Policy and Industry
- Deputy Secretary for Capability Acquisition and Sustainment
- Deputy Secretary for National Naval Shipbuilding
- Deputy Secretary for People
- Deputy Secretary for Security and Estate
- Chief Finance Officer
- Chief Information Officer
- Chief Defence Scientist
- Chief, Nuclear-Powered Submarine Task Force

=== Australian Signals Directorate ===
- Deputy Director-General for SIGINT and Effects
- Deputy Director-General for Capability and Transformation
- Head of the Australian Cyber Security Centre
- Chief Operating Officer

== Two-star level ==
In the Australian Defence Force, guided by the Defence Force Regulations 1952, the level of two-star rank is that of commissioned officer O-8 in the Australian Defence Force ranks code. This means the Australian Army rank of major general, the Royal Australian Navy rank of rear admiral, and the Royal Australian Air Force rank of air vice marshal.

In the Australian Public Service, guided by the Public Service Act 1999, the level of two-star rank is the equivalent civilian level of Senior Executive Service Band 2 which is styled as First Assistant Secretary (FAS), general manager, chief or head with the leadership of a division or agency.

=== Vice Chief of the Defence Force Group ===
- Head of Force Design
- Head of Force Integration
- Head of Military Strategic Planning
- Head of Military Strategic Commitments
- Head of Summary Discipline Implementation

=== Joint Capabilities Group ===
- Deputy Chief of Joint Capabilities and Head of Information Warfare
- Commander of the Australian Defence College
- Commander of the Joint Logistics Command
- Commander Joint Health Command and Surgeon General
- Executive Director of the Australian Civil-Military Centre
- Head of the Reserve and Youth Division and Commander of the Australian Defence Force Cadets

=== United States Army Pacific ===
- Deputy Commanding General – North of the United States Army Pacific

=== Capability Acquisition and Sustainment Group ===
- Head of Joint Systems
- Head of Maritime Systems
- General Manager for Submarines
- Head of Future Submarine Program
- General Manager for Ships
- Head of Land Systems
- Head of Helicopter Systems
- Head of Aerospace Systems
- Head of Joint Strike Fighter Program
- General Counsel and First Assistant Secretary for Commercial
- First Assistant Secretary for Program Performance
- Group Business Manager
- Chief Finance Officer

=== Strategic Policy and Intelligence Group ===
- Head of the Australian Defence Staff, Washington DC
- Military Representative to the North Atlantic Treaty Organization and the European Union
- Director of the Defence Intelligence Organisation (DIO)
- Director of the Australian Geospatial-Intelligence Organisation (AGO)
- First Assistant Secretary for International Policy
- First Assistant Secretary for Strategic Policy
- First Assistant Secretary for Defence Industry Policy

=== Australian Signals Directorate ===
- First Assistant Director-General (Network Operations and Access)
- First Assistant Director-General (Corporate)
- First Assistant Director-General (Strategic Communications)
- First Assistant Director-General (Protect, Assure and Enable)
- First Assistant Director-General (Intelligence)
- First Assistant Director-General (General Counsel)
- First Assistant Director-General (Capability)
- First Assistant Director General (Engagement, Operations and Intelligence)

=== Australian Army ===
- Deputy Chief of Army (DCA)
- Commander of the Forces Command (CFC)
- Head of Land Capability
- Special Operations Commander Australia
- Commander of the 1st Division (Deployable Joint Forces Headquarters)
- Commander of the 2nd Division

=== Joint Operations Command ===
- Commander of the Maritime Border Command
- Deputy Chief of Joint Operations (DCJOPS)
- Commander of the Joint Task Force 633 (Middle East Area of Operations)

=== Royal Australian Navy ===
- Deputy Chief of Navy (DCN) and Head of Navy People, Training and Resources
- Commander Australian Fleet (COMAUSFLT)
- Head of Navy Capability
- Head of Navy Engineering

=== Royal Australian Air Force ===
- Deputy Chief of Air Force (DCAF)
- Air Commander Australia (ACAUST)

=== Defence Science and Technology Group ===
- Deputy Chief Defence Scientist for Research Services
- Chief of Science Strategy and Program
- Chief of Science Partnerships and Engagement
- Chief of Research Services
- Chief of Maritime
- Chief of Land
- Chief of Aerospace
- Chief of Joint and Operations Analysis
- Chief of National Security and Intelligence, Surveillance and Reconnaissance
- Chief of Cyber and Electronic Warfare
- Chief of Weapons and Combat Systems
- Chief Technology Officer for National Security

=== Chief Information Officer Group ===
- Chief Technology Officer
- Head of ICT Operations
- Head of ICT Delivery
- Head of Infrastructure Transformation Program

=== Defence People Group ===
- First Assistant Secretary for People Capability
- First Assistant Secretary for People Policy and Culture
- First Assistant Secretary for People Services

=== Defence Security and Estate Group ===
- First Assistant Secretary for Service Delivery
- First Assistant Secretary for Infrastructure

=== Chief Finance Officer Group ===
- First Assistant Secretary for Financial Services
- First Assistant Secretary for Resource and Assurance

=== Associate Secretary Group ===
- First Assistant Secretary for Ministerial and Executive Coordination and Communication
- First Assistant Secretary for Governance and Reform
- First Assistant Secretary for Audit and Fraud Control
- First Assistant Secretary for Security and Vetting Service
- Inspector General
- Judge Advocate General (JAG)
- Chief Judge Advocate
- Head of Defence Legal
- Program Manager of Enterprise Resource Planning

=== United Nations ===
- Force Commander of the United Nations Peacekeeping Force in Cyprus

== One-star level ==
In the Australian Defence Force, guided by the Defence Force Regulations 1952, the level of one-star rank is that of commissioned officer O-7 in the Australian Defence Force ranks code. This means the Australian Army rank of brigadier, the Royal Australian Navy rank of commodore, and the Royal Australian Air Force rank of air commodore.

In the Australian Public Service, guided by the Public Service Act 1999, the level of one-star rank is the equivalent civilian level of Senior Executive Service Band 1 which is styled as Assistant Secretary (AS) or director-general with the leadership of a branch.

=== Office of the Chief of the Defence Force ===
- Liaison Officer to the Chairman of the United States Joint Chiefs of Staff

=== Vice Chief of the Defence Force Group ===
- Director General of Joint Force Analysis
- Deputy Director of the Australian Civil-Military Centre
- Director General of Military Information Effects
- Director General of Military Strategic Commitments
- Head of the Centenary of ANZAC Planning Team
- Director General of Command, Control, Communications, Computers, and Intelligence and Training Support
- Commander of the Joint Counter Improvised Threats Task Force

=== Australian Signals Directorate ===
- Commander of the Defence SIGINT and Cyber Command

=== Joint Capabilities Group ===
- Principal of the Centre for Defence and Strategic Studies
- Commandant of the Australian Defence Force Academy
- Principal of the Australian Command and Staff College
- Director General of C4I and Training Support
- Director General of Capability Integration Test and Evaluation
- Director General of Capability Workstream
- Director General of Joint Counter Improvised Threats Task Force
- Director General of Joint Information Environment Warfare
- Chief of Staff and Executive Director of Corporate Management of the Joint Logistics Command
- Director General of Explosive Ordnance
- Director General of Fuel Services
- Director General of Logistics Assurance
- Director General of Logistics Systems
- Director General of Strategic Logistics
- Director General of Supply Chain
- Director General of Garrison Health Operations
- Director General of Health Capability
- Director General of Mental Health, Psychology and Rehabilitation
- Director General of Strategic Health Coordination

=== Capability Acquisition and Sustainment Group ===
- Assistant Secretary for Intelligence, Surveillance, Reconnaissance and Electronic Warfare
- Assistant Secretary for Critical Systems
- Assistant Secretary for Communication Systems
- Assistant Secretary for Air and Space Surveillance Control
- Assistant Secretary for Explosive Materiel
- Assistant Secretary for Major Surface Ships
- Assistant Secretary for Specialist Ship
- Assistant Secretary for Maritime Support
- Assistant Secretary for Integrated Soldier Systems
- Assistant Secretary for Land Manoeuvre Systems
- Assistant Secretary for Land Vehicle Systems
- Assistant Secretary for Combined Arms Fighting System
- Assistant Secretary for Land Engineering Agency
- Assistant Secretary for Commodity Reform Program
- Assistant Secretary for Army Aviation Systems
- Assistant Secretary for Navy Aviation Systems
- Assistant Secretary for Airlift and Tanker Systems
- Assistant Secretary for Aerospace Combat Systems
- Assistant Secretary for Aerospace Maritime, Training and Surveillance
- Assistant Secretary for Governance and Management
- Assistant Secretary for Acquisition and Sustainment Policy
- Assistant Secretary for Program Management
- Assistant Secretary for Disposals and Sales

=== Strategic Policy and Intelligence Group ===
- Deputy Director of the Australian Geospatial-Intelligence Organisation
- Deputy Director of the Defence Intelligence Organisation
- Assistant Secretary for Arms Control
- Assistant Secretary for Military Strategy
- Assistant Secretary for Strategic Policy
- Assistant Secretary for Intelligence Policy Integration
- Assistant Secretary for Global Interests
- Assistant Secretary for Major Powers
- Assistant Secretary for Pacific and Timor-Leste
- Assistant Secretary for South East Asia
- Assistant Secretary for Defence Industry
- Assistant Secretary for Defence Export Controls
- Assistant Secretary for Defence Capability and Innovation
- Head of the Australian Defence Staff in London
- Head of the Australian Defence Staff in Jakarta
- Air Force Attaché of the Australian Defence Staff in Washington DC
- Military Attaché of the Australian Defence Staff in Washington DC
- Naval Attaché of the Australian Defence Staff in Washington DC

=== Australian Army ===
- Commanding Officer of the 1st Brigade
- Commanding Officer of the 3rd Brigade
- Commanding Officer of the 6th Brigade
- Commanding Officer of the 7th Brigade
- Commanding Officer of the 16th Aviation Brigade
- Commanding Officer of the 17th Sustainment Brigade
- Commanding Officer of the 4th Brigade
- Commanding Officer of the 5th Brigade
- Commanding Officer of the 8th Brigade
- Commanding Officer of the 9th Brigade
- Commanding Officer of the 11th Brigade
- Commanding Officer of the 13th Brigade
- Commandant of the Royal Military College, Duntroon
- Director-General of Future Land Warfare
- Director-General of Development and Plans
- Director-General of Reserves
- Commander - Australian Army Cadets

=== Joint Operations Command ===
- Commander of the Northern Command
- Commander of Task Group Afghanistan
- Commander of the Australian Air Task Group in Iraq
- Chief of Staff

=== Royal Australian Navy ===
==== Strategic Command ====
- Chief of Staff of the Strategic Command
- Australian Hydrographer
- Director-General of Capability Plans and Engagement
- Director-General of Navy Business and Governance
- Director-General of Navy Capability Transition and Sustainment
- Director-General of Navy Communications and Coordination
- Director-General of Navy Communications and Information Warfare
- Director-General of Navy Submarine Capability
- Navy Scientific Adviser
- Director-General of Australian Navy Cadets and Reserves
- Director-General of Chaplaincy
- Director-General of Navy Certification and Safety
- Director-General of Navy Health Services / Director-General of Navy Health Reserves
- Director-General of Navy People
- Commodore of Training

==== Fleet Command ====
- Director-General of Maritime Operations
- Chief of Staff of the Fleet Command
- Commander of the Fleet Air Arm
- Commander of the Surface Force
- Commodore of the Shore Force
- Commodore of Warfare
- Commander of the Information Warfare Force

=== Royal Australian Air Force ===
- Director-General of Strategy and Planning
- Director-General of Capability Planning
- Director-General of Personnel
- Director-General of Reserves
- Director-General of Logistics
- Commander of the Air Warfare Centre

=== Defence People Group ===
- Assistant Secretary for Human Resources Services
- Assistant Secretary for Pay and Administration
- Assistant Secretary for Work Health and Safety
- Assistant Secretary for Culture and People Development
- Assistant Secretary for Defence Learning
- Assistant Secretary for People Policy and Employment Conditions
- Assistant Secretary for Workforce Planning
- Director General of Defence Force Recruiting
- Director General of the Defence Community Organisation
- Director General of Project Suakin

=== Defence Security and Estate Group ===
- Assistant Secretary for Capital Facilities and Infrastructure
- Assistant Secretary for Environment and Engineering
- Assistant Secretary for Estate Planning
- Assistant Secretary for Property Management
- Assistant Secretary for Regional Services
- Assistant Secretary for Estate Service Delivery
- Assistant Secretary for Service Delivery Program Management and Governance
- Director General of Base Planning Engagement and Service Performance

=== Chief Finance Officer Group ===
- Assistant Secretary for Finance Business Information
- Assistant Secretary for Costing and Coordination
- Assistant Secretary for Financial Coordination

=== Associate Secretary Group ===
- Assistant Secretary for Fraud Control and Investigations
- Assistant Secretary for Audit
- Assistant Secretary for Security Operations
- Assistant Secretary for Security Policy and Plans
- Assistant Secretary for Vetting
- Assistant Secretary for Enterprise Governance
- Assistant Secretary for Enterprise Reform
- Assistant Secretary for Information Management and Access
- Assistant Secretary for Communication
- Assistant Secretary for Ministerial and Parliamentary
- Deputy Judge Advocate General - Army
- Deputy Judge Advocate General - Navy
- Deputy Judge Advocate General - Air Force
- Director of Military Prosecutions
- Deputy Inspector-General of the Australian Defence Force
- Defence General Counsel
- Defence Special Counsel
- Director General of Australian Defence Force Legal Services
- Program Manager of the United States Force Posture Initiatives and Singapore Joint Development Implementation

== See also ==
- Current senior Australian Defence Organisation personnel
