= Current senior Australian Defence Organisation personnel =

The Australian Defence Organisation (ADO) is composed of the armed forces of the Commonwealth of Australia, the Australian Defence Force (ADF), and the Australian Public Service government department, the Department of Defence which is composed of a range of civilian support organisations.

The Chief of the Defence Force (CDF) leads the Australian Defence Force and the Secretary of Defence leads the Department of Defence though both jointly manage the Australian Defence Organisation under a diarchy, and both report directly to the Minister for Defence.

The highest active rank in the Australian Defence Force is reserved for the Chief of the Defence Force. This is a four-star rank and the CDF is the only Australian military officer at that level. As a result of the diarchy, the Secretary of the Department of Defence is of the equivalent civilian four-star level in the Senior Executive Service of the Australian Public Service.

== Command and Control ==
The Commander-in-Chief of the Australian Defence Force is set out under Section 68 of the Constitution of Australia, stating "the command in chief of the naval and military forces of the Commonwealth is vested in the Governor-General as the King's representative".

In practice, the Governor-General is the ceremonial head of the Australian Defence Force and command and control power is delegated to the Prime Minister and the Minister for Defence. The National Security Committee of Cabinet also plays an important role in the strategic direction of the Australian Defence Organisation including directing overseas deployments and going to war.

== Five-star level ==
Currently the five-star level is not an active serving rank in the Australian Defence Force. Australia has only had one active serving five-star rank officer within the armed forces of the Commonwealth of Australia. This was Sir Thomas Blamey who was appointed Field Marshal in the Australian Army in 1950 and presented his field marshal's baton by the then Governor-General William McKell. Blamey was seriously ill at the time and died three months later.

Until his death, His Royal Highness Prince Philip, Duke of Edinburgh held the ranks of Field Marshal, Admiral of the Fleet, and Marshal of the Royal Australian Air Force. He was appointed to each rank on 2 April 1954.

His Majesty George VI was also appointed Marshal of the Royal Australian Air Force, maintaining the rank from 2 June 1939 until his death on 6 February 1952.

== Four-star level ==
In the Australian Defence Force, guided by the Defence Force Regulations 1952, the level of four-star rank is that of commissioned officer O-10 in the Australian Defence Force ranks code. This means the Australian Army rank of general, the Royal Australian Navy rank of admiral, and the Royal Australian Air Force rank of air chief marshal.

In the Australian Public Service, guided by the Public Service Act 1999, the level of four-star rank is the equivalent civilian level of Senior Executive Service Band 4, which is styled as secretary with the leadership of a department.

- Chief of the Defence Force (CDF)
- Secretary of Defence (SECDEF)
- Director-General of the Australian Signals Directorate (ASD)

== Three-star level ==
In the Australian Defence Force, guided by the Defence Force Regulations 1952, the level of three-star rank is that of commissioned officer O-9 in the Australian Defence Force ranks code. This means the Australian Army rank of lieutenant general, the Royal Australian Navy rank of vice admiral, and the Royal Australian Air Force rank of air marshal.

In the Australian Public Service, guided by the Public Service Act 1999, the level of three-star rank is the equivalent civilian level of Senior Executive Service Band 3, which is styled as associate secretary or deputy secretary (DEPSEC) or a chief portfolio officer, with the leadership of a group or agency.

=== Australian Defence Force ===
- Vice Chief of the Defence Force (VCDF)
- Chief of Navy (CN)
- Chief of Army (CA)
- Chief of Air Force (CAF)
- Chief of Joint Operations (CJOPS)
- Chief of Joint Capabilities (CJC)
- Chief of Defence Intelligence (CDI)
- Chief of Personnel (CP)
- Chief of Guided Weapons and Explosive Ordnance (CGWEO)
- Principal Deputy Director-General of the Australian Signals Directorate

=== Department of Defence ===
- Associate Secretary of the Department of Defence
- Deputy Secretary for Strategic Policy and Intelligence
- Deputy Secretary for Capability Acquisition and Sustainment
- Deputy Secretary for People
- Deputy Secretary for Estate and Infrastructure
- Chief Finance Officer
- Chief Information Officer
- Chief Defence Scientist

== Two-star level ==
In the Australian Defence Force, guided by the Defence Force Regulations 1952, the level of two-star rank is that of commissioned officer O-8 in the Australian Defence Force ranks code. This means the Australian Army rank of major general, the Royal Australian Navy rank of rear admiral, and the Royal Australian Air Force rank of air vice marshal.

In the Australian Public Service, guided by the Public Service Act 1999, the level of two-star rank is the equivalent civilian level of Senior Executive Service Band 2, which is styled as First Assistant Secretary (FAS), General Manager, Chief or Head with the leadership of a division or agency.

=== Vice Chief of the Defence Force Group ===
- Head of Force Design
- Head of Centenary of ANZAC
- Head of Joint Capability Management and Integration
- Head of Military Strategic Commitments
- Head of Reserve and Youth and Commander of the Australian Defence Force Cadets
- Executive Director of the Australian Civil-Military Centre

=== Joint Capabilities Group ===
- Commander of Joint Capabilities (CJC)
- Commander of the Australian Defence College
- Commander of the Joint Logistics Command
- Commander Joint Health and Surgeon General
- Head of Information Warfare

=== Capability Acquisition and Sustainment Group ===
- Head of Joint Systems
- Head of Maritime Systems
- General manager for Submarines
- Head of Future Submarine Program
- General manager for Ships
- Head of Land Systems
- Head of Helicopter Systems
- Head of Aerospace Systems
- Head of Joint Strike Fighter Program
- General Counsel and First Assistant Secretary for Commercial
- First Assistant Secretary for Program Performance
- Group Business Manager
- Chief Finance Officer

=== Strategic Policy and Intelligence Group ===
- Head of the Australian Defence Staff, Washington DC
- Director of the Defence Intelligence Organisation (DIO)
- Director of the Australian Geospatial-Intelligence Organisation (AGO)
- First Assistant Secretary for International Policy
- First Assistant Secretary for Strategic Policy
- First Assistant Secretary for Defence Industry Policy
- First Assistant Secretary for Contestability
- First Assistant Secretary for the Naval Shipbuilding Taskforce

=== Australian Army ===
- Deputy Chief of Army (DCA)
- Commander of the Forces Command (CFC)
- Head of Land Capability
- Special Operations Commander Australia
- Commander of the 1st Division (Deployable Joint Forces Headquarters)
- Commander of the 2nd Division

=== Joint Operations Command ===
- Commander of the Maritime Border Command
- Deputy Chief of Joint Operations (DCJOPS)
- Commander of Joint Task Force 633 (Middle East Region)

=== Royal Australian Navy ===
- Deputy Chief of Navy (DCN) and Head of Navy People Training and Resources
- Commander Australian Fleet (COMAUSFLT)
- Head of Navy Capability
- Head of Navy Engineering

=== Royal Australian Air Force ===
- Deputy Chief of Air Force (DCAF)
- Air Commander Australia (ACAUST)

=== Defence Science and Technology Group ===
- Chief of Science Strategy and Program
- Chief of Science Partnerships and Engagement
- Chief of Research Services
- Chief of Maritime
- Chief of Land
- Chief of Aerospace
- Chief of Joint and Operations Analysis
- Chief of National Security and Intelligence, Surveillance and Reconnaissance
- Chief of Cyber and Electronic Warfare
- Chief of Weapons and Combat Systems

=== Chief Information Officer Group ===
- Chief Technology Officer
- Head of ICT Operations
- First Assistant Secretary for ICT Delivery

=== Defence People Group ===
- First Assistant Secretary for People Capability
- First Assistant Secretary for People Policy and Culture
- First Assistant Secretary for People Services

=== Defence Security and Estate Group ===
- First Assistant Secretary for Service Delivery
- First Assistant Secretary for Infrastructure

=== Chief Finance Officer Group ===
- First Assistant Secretary for Financial Services
- First Assistant Secretary for Resource and Assurance

=== Associate Secretary Group ===
- First Assistant Secretary for Ministerial and Executive Coordination and Communication
- First Assistant Secretary for Governance and Reform
- First Assistant Secretary for Audit and Fraud Control
- First Assistant Secretary for Security and Vetting Service
- Inspector General
- Judge Advocate General (JAG)
- Chief Judge Advocate
- Head of Defence Legal

== See also ==
- Senior Australian Defence Organisation Positions
