= Ranks and insignia of the Royal Australian Air Force =

Rank structure of the Royal Australian Air Force (RAAF)

The rank structure of the Royal Australian Air Force (RAAF) has been inherited from the Royal Air Force (RAF). The RAF based its officer ranks on the Royal Navy, and its airmen ranks on the British Army.

Unlike the RAF, RAAF rank abbreviations are always written in uppercase without spaces (e.g. Pilot Officer is written as PLTOFF, not Plt Off).

The rank insignia is very similar to that of the RAF for Corporal and above and for all officers. However the RAAF does not have the ranks of Senior Aircraftman, Junior Technician, Chief Technician or Master Aircrew. In 2022 the RAF renamed their lower ranks of Aircraftman (AC) to Air Recruit (AR) and Leading Aircraftman (LAC) to the ranks of Air Specialist '(Class 2 and 1)' and '(Class 1) Technician' to be more inclusive as they did not have the Aircraftwoman title for female service members. Both officers and airmen wear rank insignia on the chest when wearing General Purpose Uniform or Disruptive Pattern Combat Uniform. Rank insignia is worn on the shoulder in all other orders of dress with the exception of the Service Dress tunic where it is worn on the cuff for officers and lower sleeve for Warrant Officers and the upper sleeve for airmen in their tunic and the sleeve of all enlisted Physical Training Instructors (PTIs) working uniform. The word 'Australia' appears immediately below all rank insignia worn on the shoulder or chest.

The most senior active rank of the RAAF, Air Marshal – a three-star rank, is held by the Chief of Air Force. (Note: Other joint 3-star positions available to RAAF officers are VCDF, CJOPS, and CCDG.) On the occasions that the Chief of the Defence Force is an officer of the RAAF, the rank of Air Chief Marshal is awarded. The rank of Marshal of the Royal Australian Air Force has never been held as an active rank, however it is held as an honorary rank; previously by Prince Philip, Duke of Edinburgh until his death in 2021, and currently by Charles III, King of Australia.

== Officer ranks ==
=== Air Officers ===
Insignia					
Title	Marshal of the RAAF	Air Chief Marshal	Air Marshal	Air Vice-Marshal	Air Commodore
Abbreviation	MRAAF	ACM	AIRMSHL	AVM	AIRCDRE
ADF Code	-	O-10	O-9	O-8	O-7
NATO Code	OF-10	OF-9	OF-8	OF-7	OF-6
Army Equivalent	Field marshal	General	Lieutenant general	Major general	Brigadier (Note: Note that although all three ranks are equivalent, and all three ranks are "1 star" positions, an Air Commodore is considered an "Air Officer", a Commodore is considered an "Admiral", but a Brigadier is not a "General". Until about 1922, many Commonwealth nations used the rank of Brigadier General, with a similar rank insignia, but by the end of the 1920s, Australia had replaced it with the rank of Brigadier, and a rank insignia similar to that of the Senior Officer rank of Colonel. Hence, in the Australian army, a Brigadier is a Senior Officer, not a General.)
Navy Equivalent	Admiral of the Fleet	Admiral	Vice Admiral	Rear Admiral	Commodore

=== Senior Officers ===
Insignia			
Title	Group Captain	Wing Commander	Squadron Leader
Abbreviation	GPCAPT	WGCDR	SQNLDR
ADF Code	O-6	O-5	O-4
NATO Code	OF-5	OF-4	OF-3
Army Equivalent	Colonel	Lieutenant Colonel	Major
Navy Equivalent	Captain	Commander	Lieutenant Commander

=== Junior Officers ===
Insignia				
Title	Flight Lieutenant	Flying Officer	Pilot Officer	Officer Cadet
Abbreviation	FLTLT	FLGOFF	PLTOFF	OFFCDT
ADF Code	O-3	O-2	O-1	O-0
NATO Code	OF-2	OF-1	OF-1	
Army Equivalent	Captain	Lieutenant	Second Lieutenant	
Navy Equivalent	Lieutenant	Sub Lieutenant	Acting Sub Lieutenant	Midshipman

== Enlisted ranks ==
=== Warrant Officer ===
Insignia	Warrant Officer
Title	Warrant Officer
Abbreviation	WOFF
ADF Code	E-9
NATO Code	OR-9
Army Equivalent	Warrant Officer Class 1
Navy Equivalent	Warrant Officer

=== Non-Commissioned Officers ===
Insignia	Flight Sergeant	Sergeant	Corporal
Title	Flight Sergeant	Sergeant	Corporal
Abbreviation	FSGT	SGT	CPL
ADF Code	E-8	E-6	E-5
NATO Code	OR-8	OR-6	OR-5
Army Equivalent	Warrant Officer Class 2	Sergeant	Corporal
Navy Equivalent	Chief Petty Officer	Petty Officer	Leading Seaman

=== Aircraftmen/women ===
Insignia	Leading Aircraftman	Aircraftman
Title	Leading Aircraftman/Leading Aircraftwoman	Aircraftman/Aircraftwoman
Abbreviation	LAC/LACW	AC/ACW
ADF Code	E-3	E-1/2
NATO Code	OR-3	OR-1/2
Army Equivalent	Private Proficient	Private
Navy Equivalent	Able Seaman	Seaman

== Special insignia ==
Insignia	Warrant Officer of the Air Force
Title	Warrant Officer of the Air Force
Abbreviation	WOFF-AF
Rank	WOFF
ADF Code	E-10
NATO Code	OR-9
Army Equivalent	Regimental Sergeant Major of the Army; Rank: Warrant Officer
Navy Equivalent	Warrant Officer of the Navy; Rank: Warrant Officer

== See also ==
- Australian Defence Force ranks and insignia
- Australian Army officer rank insignia
- Australian Army enlisted rank insignia
