= Comparative air force officer ranks of Anglophone countries =

Rank comparison chart of officers for air forces of Anglophone states.

== Officers ==
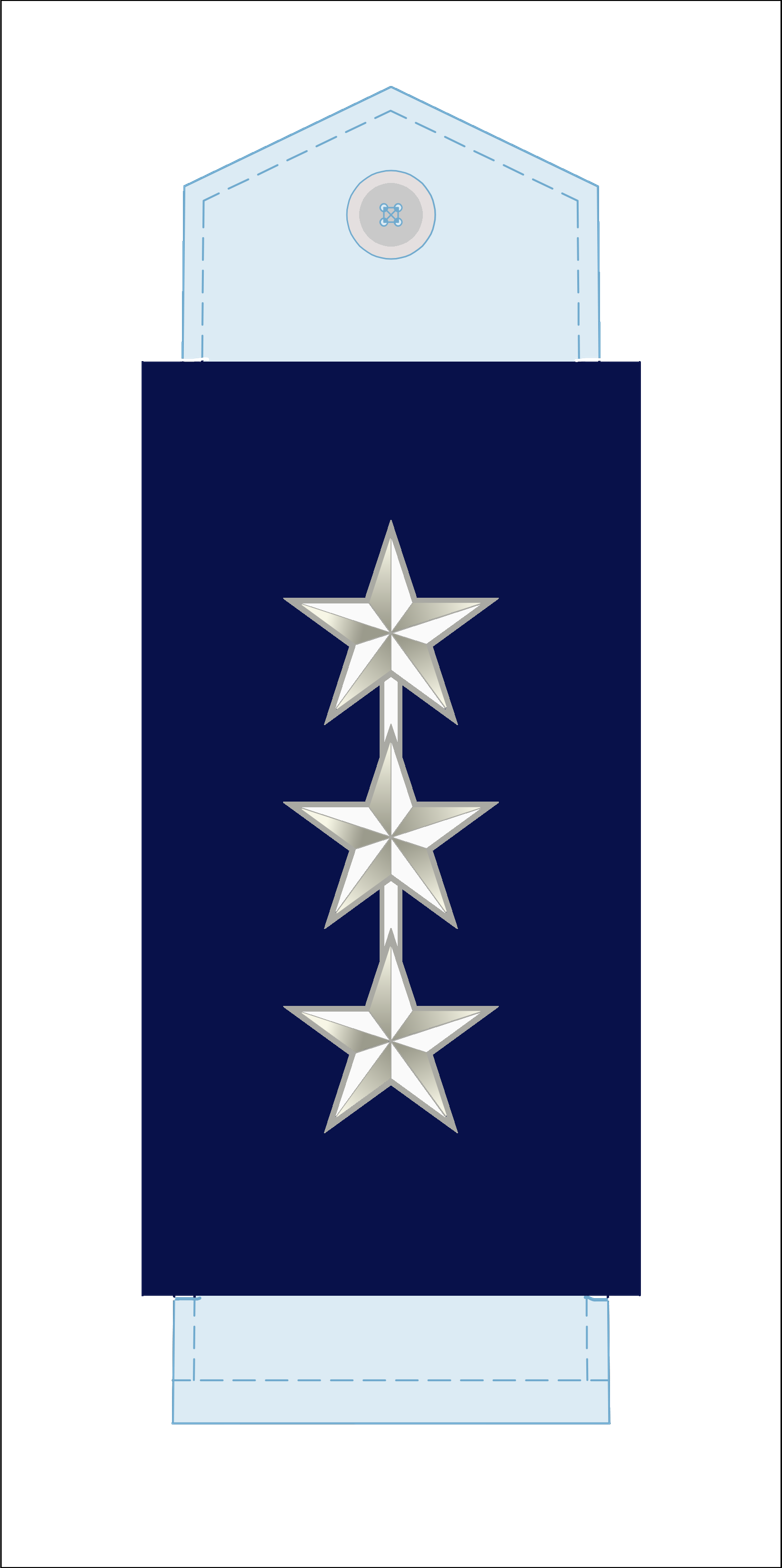
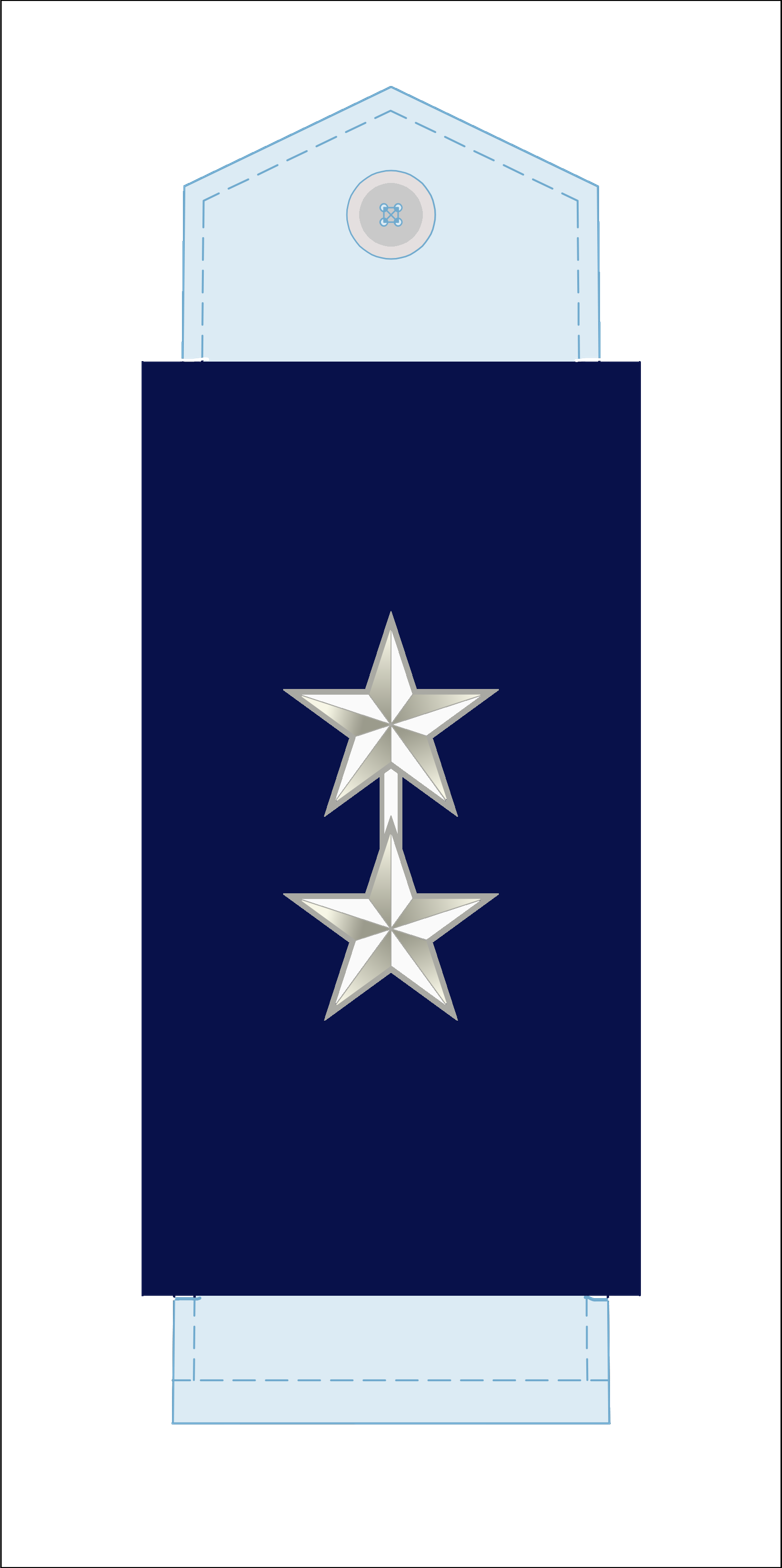
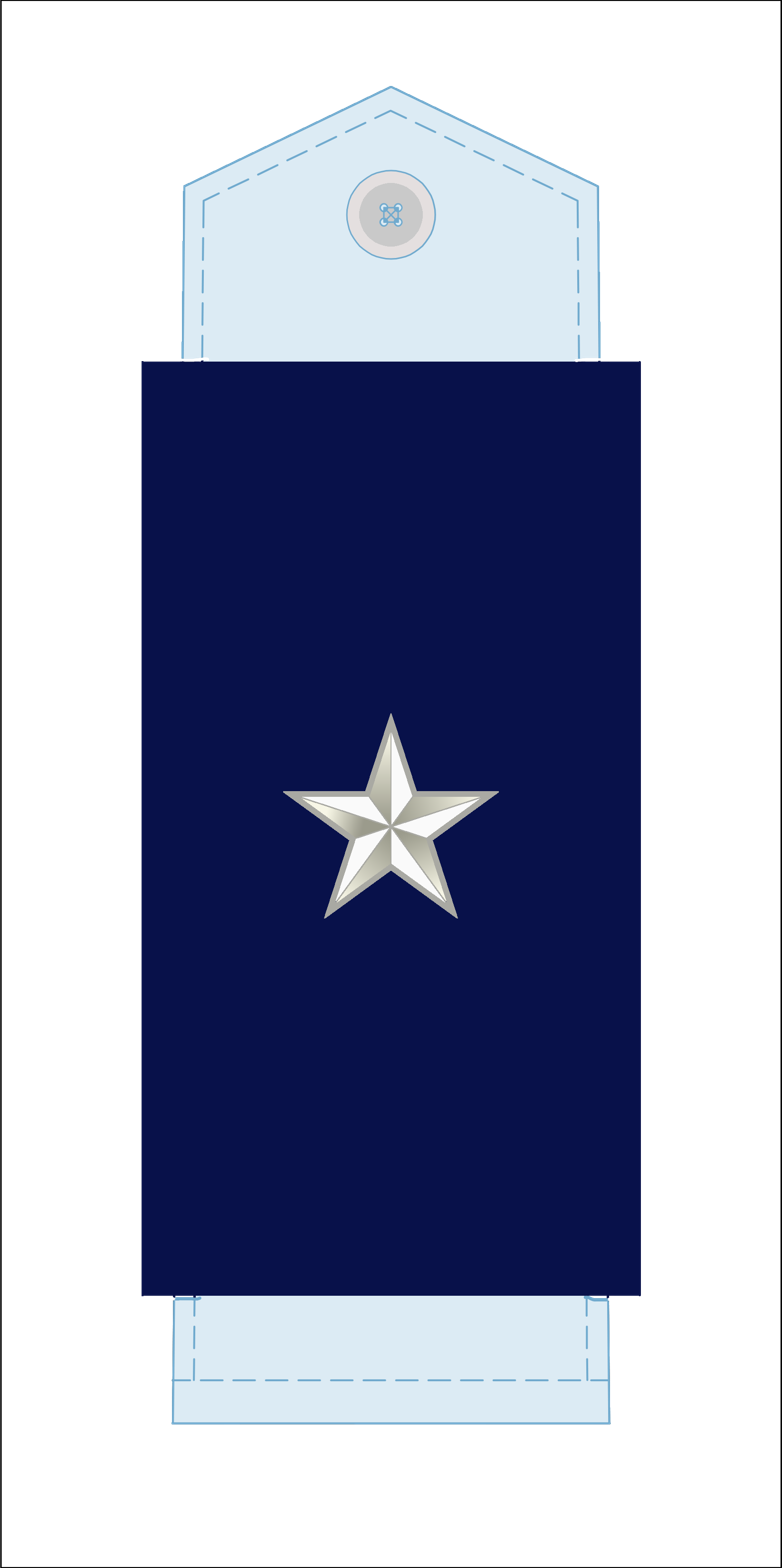
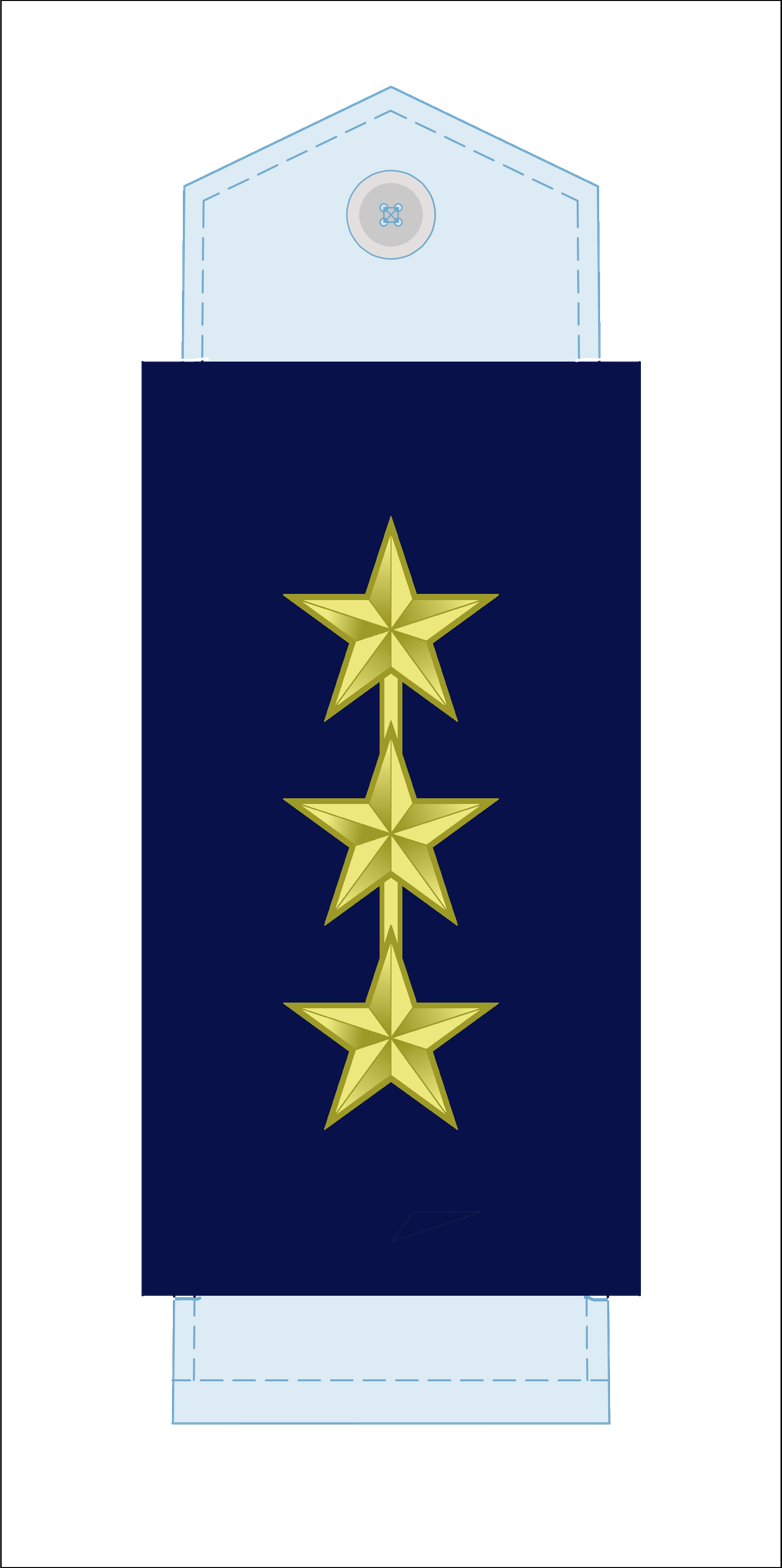
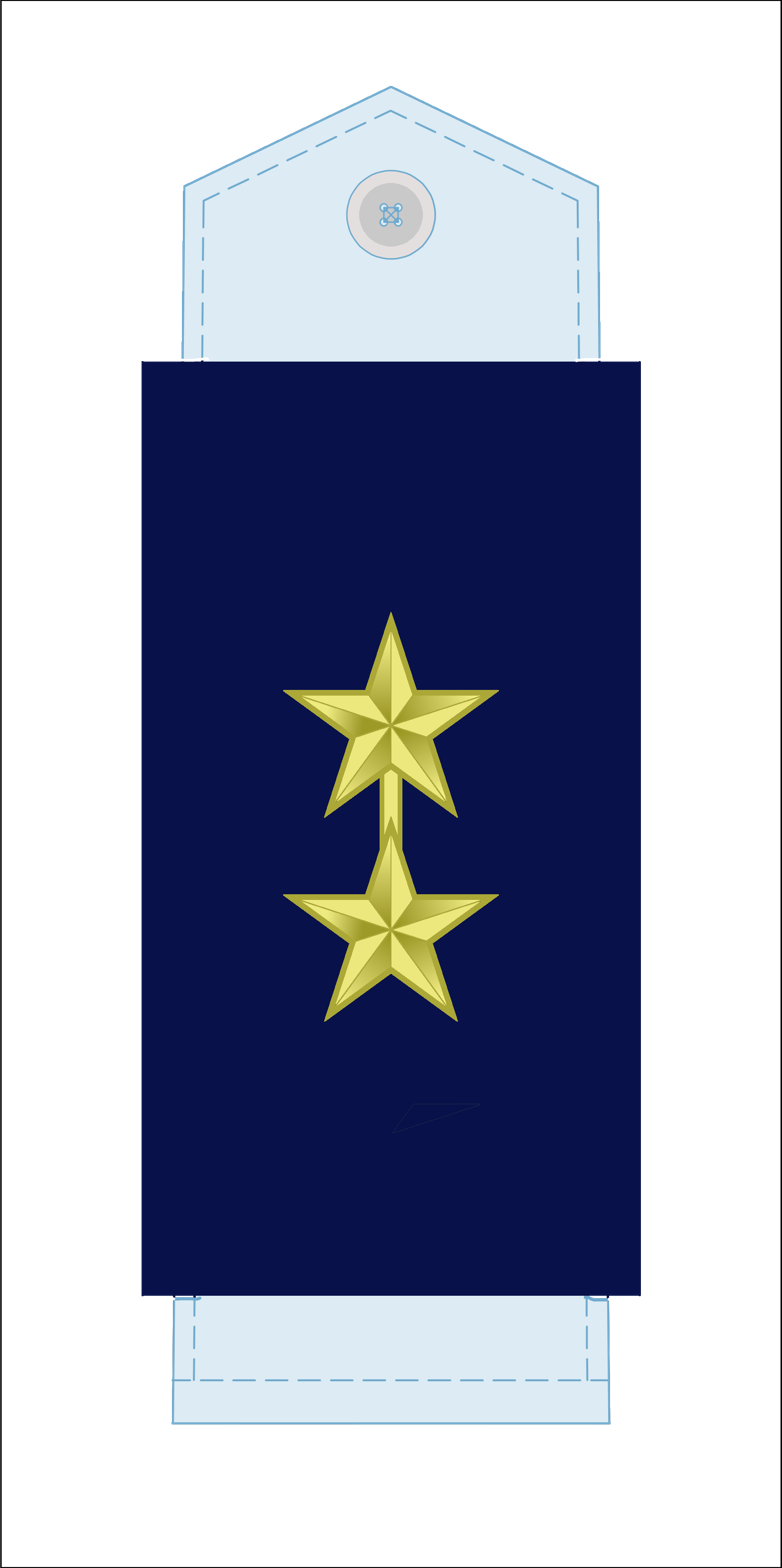
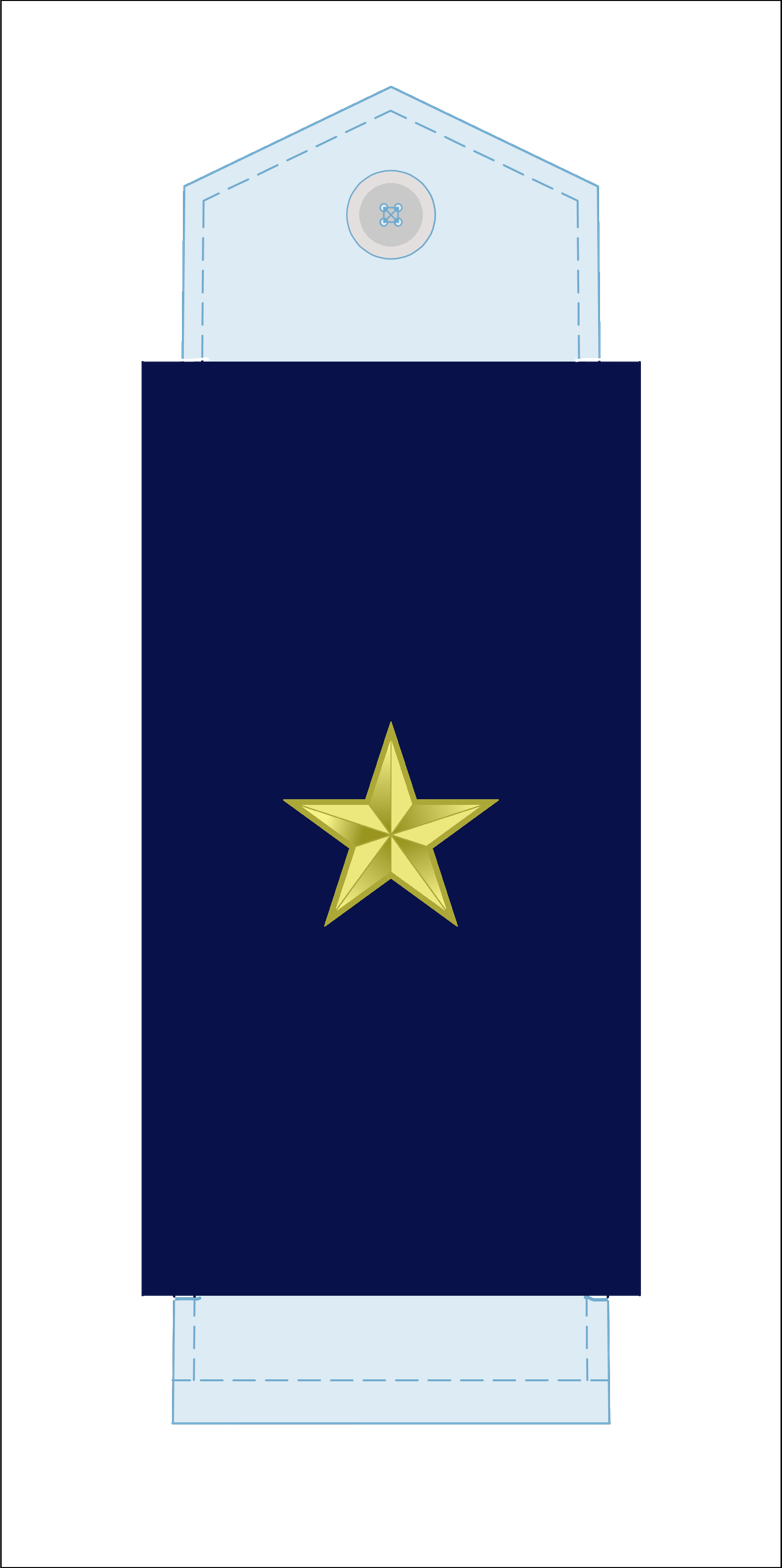
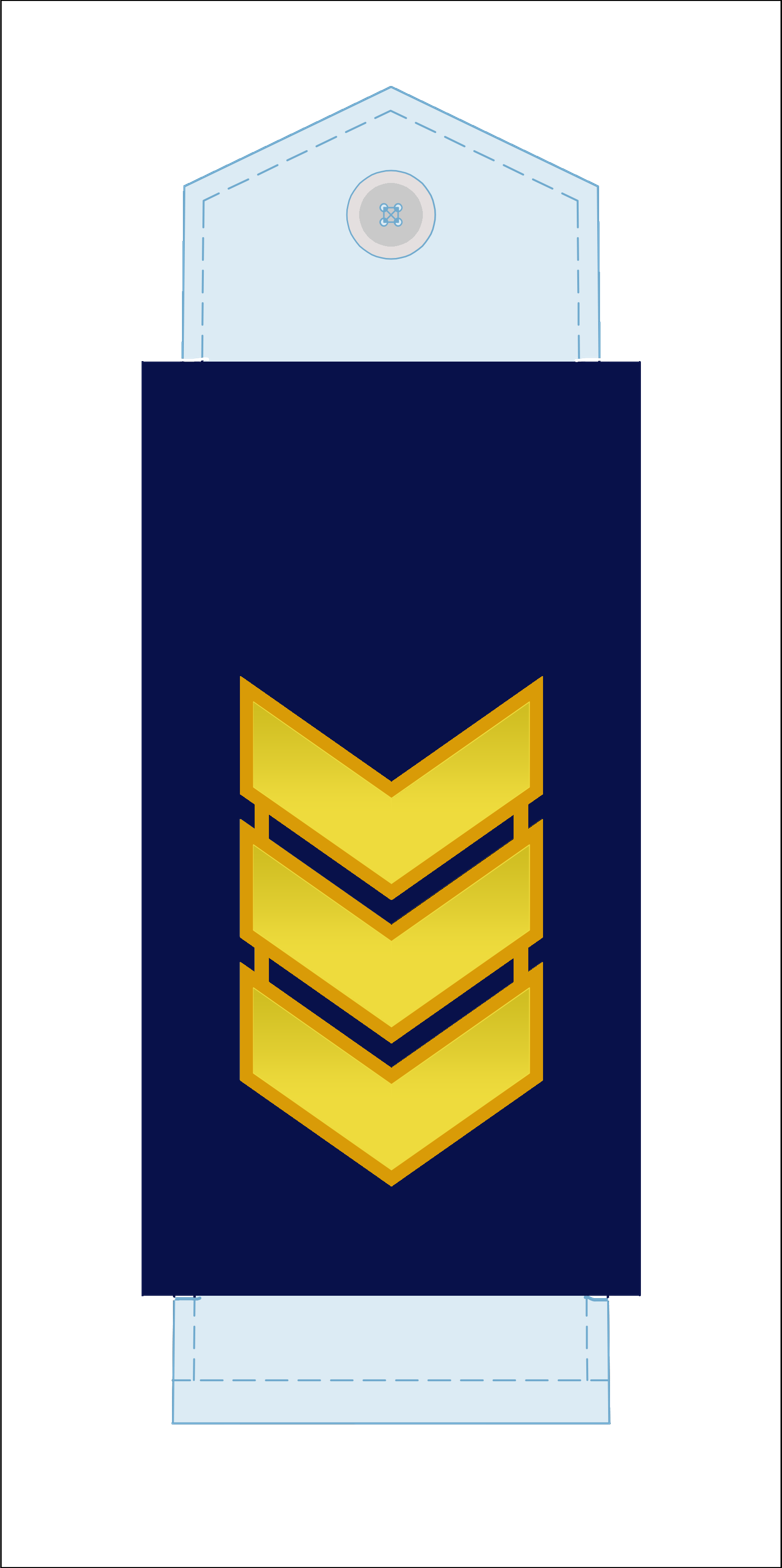
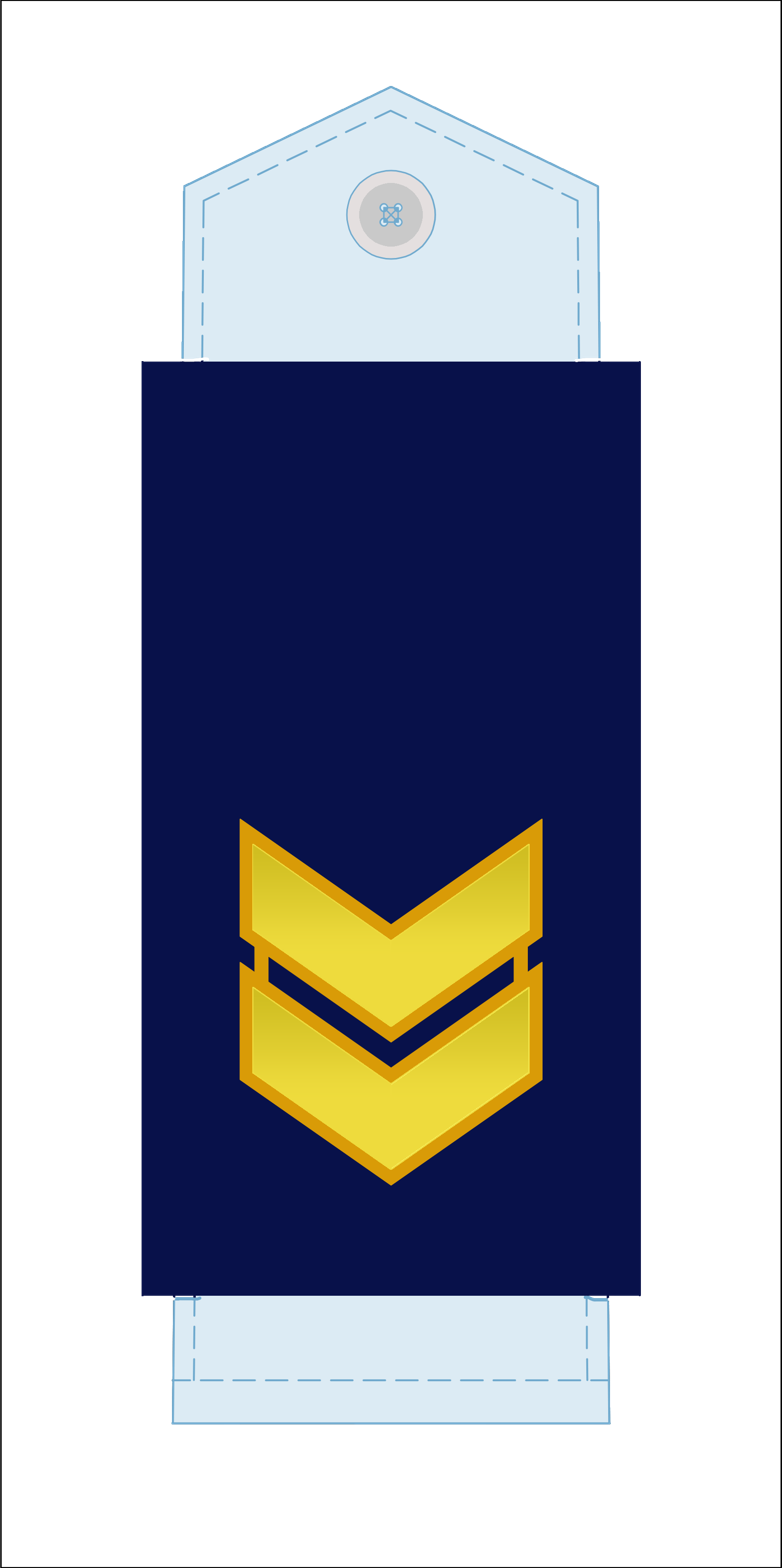
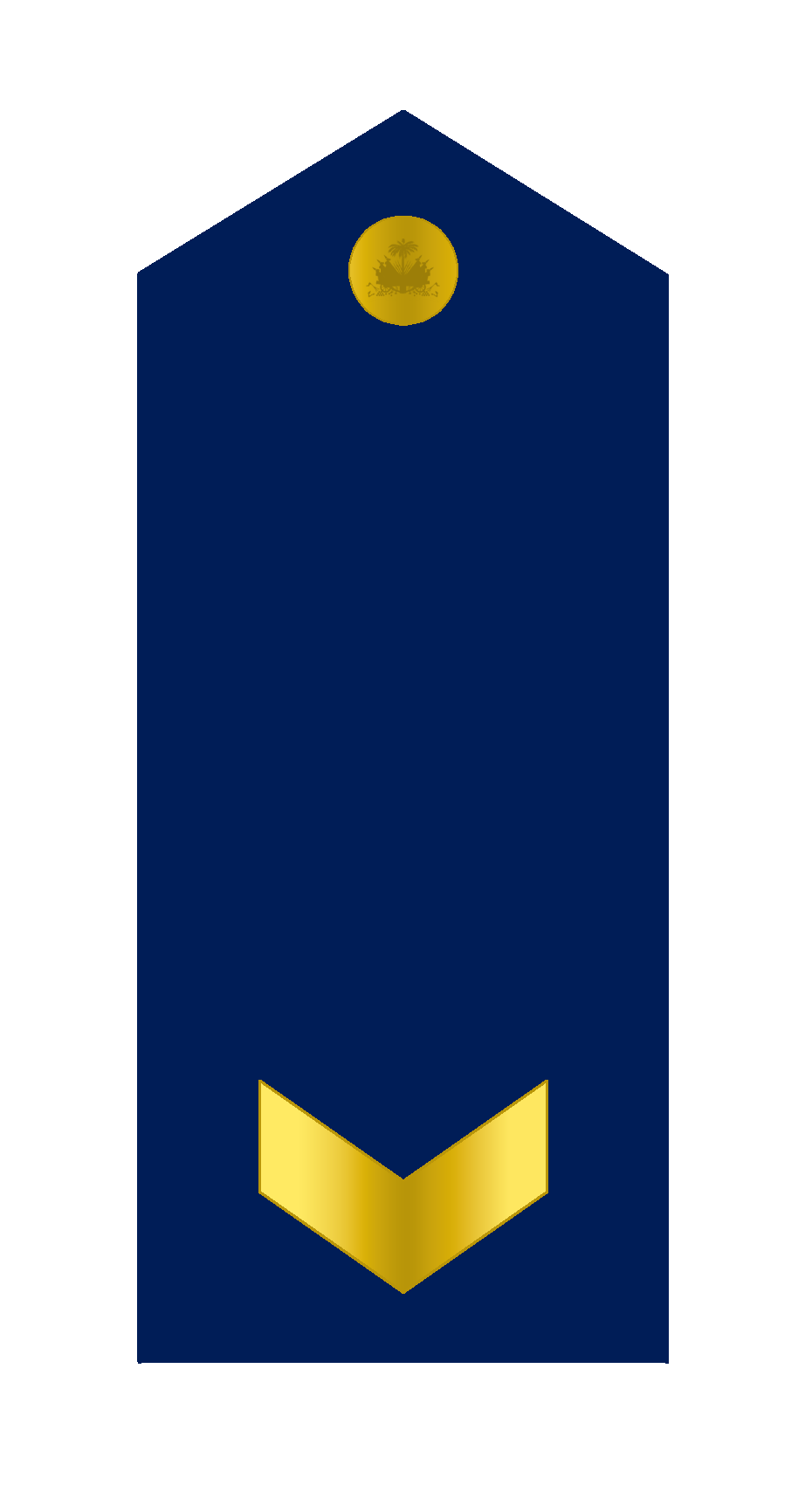
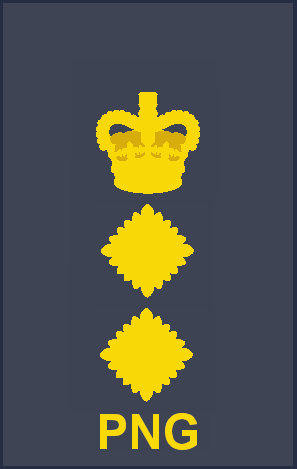
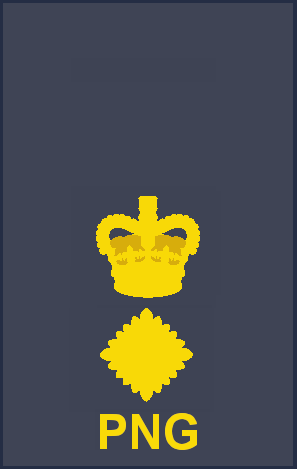
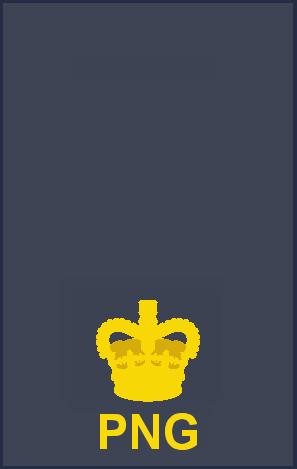
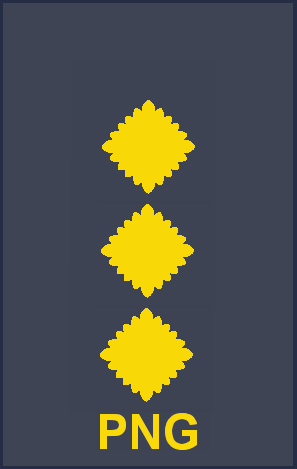
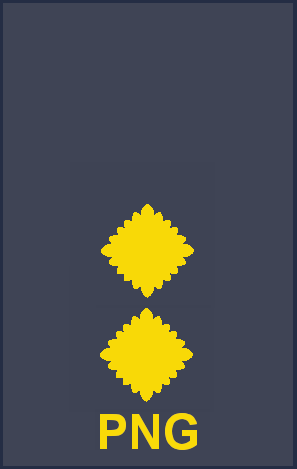
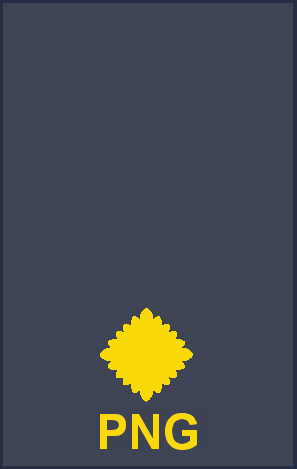
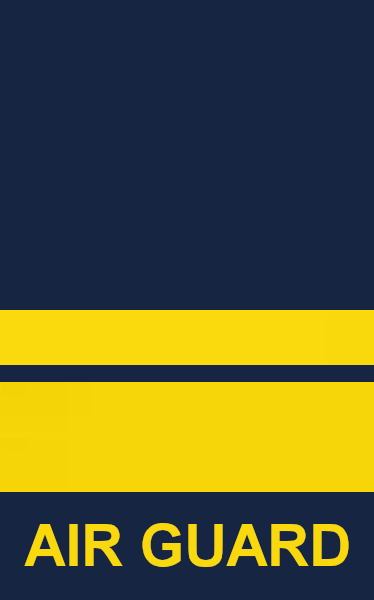
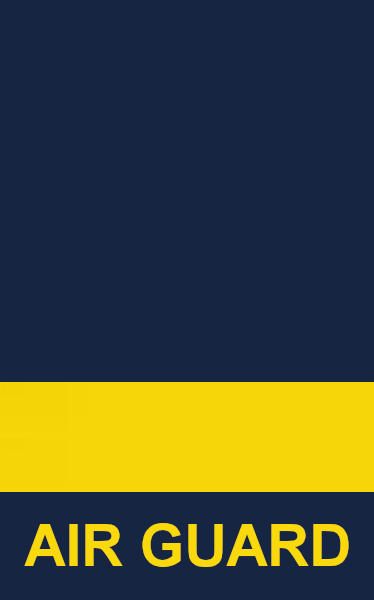
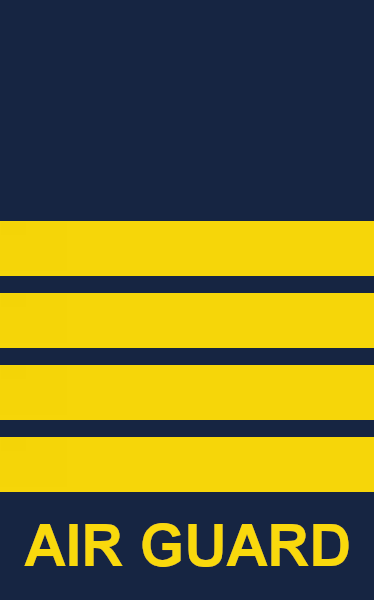
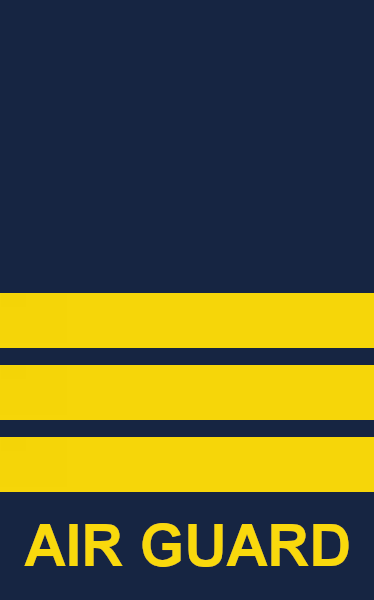
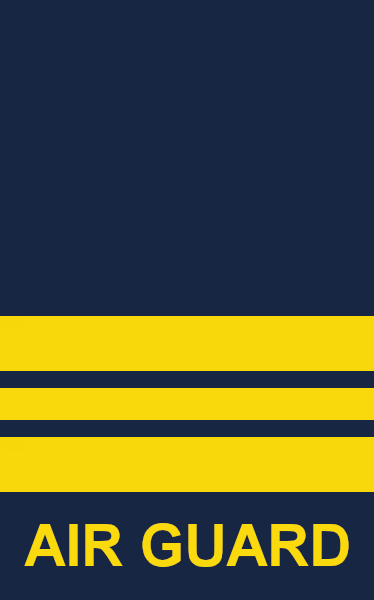
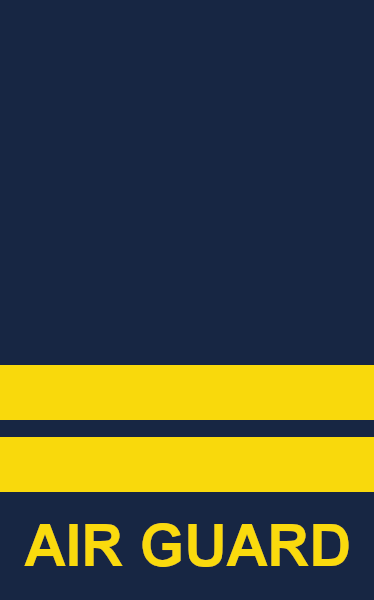
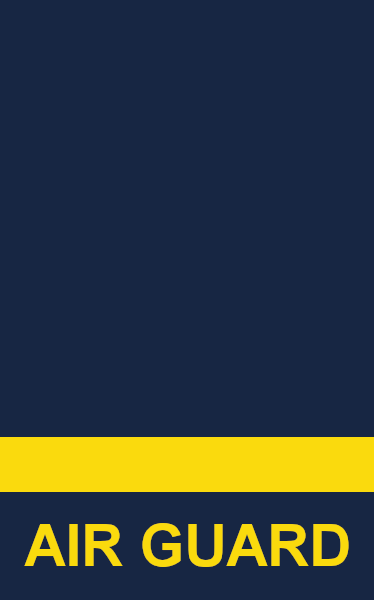
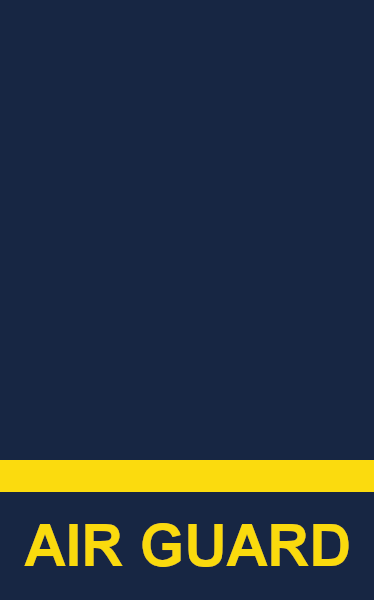
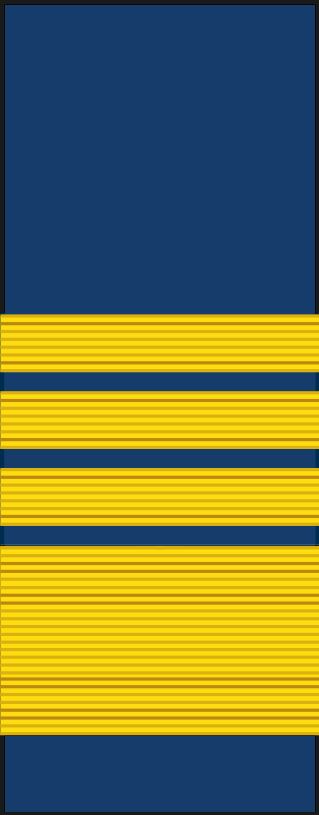
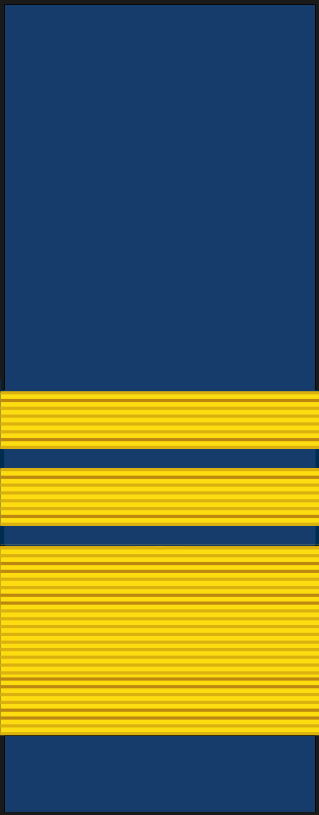
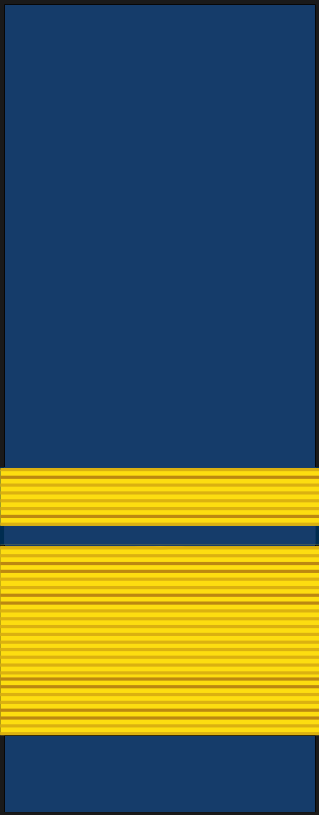
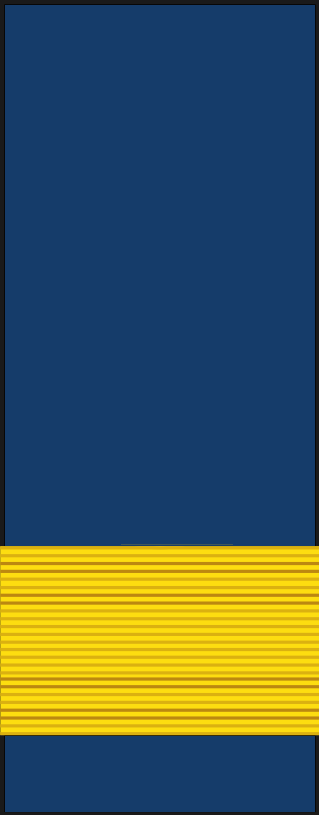
Rank group	General/Flag/Air officers					Senior officers					Junior officers
Antigua and Barbuda	No air force
Royal Australian Air Force
Royal Australian Air Force	Marshal of the RAAF	Air chief marshal	Air marshal	Air vice-marshal	Air commodore	Group captain		Wing commander		Squadron leader	Flight lieutenant	Flying officer	Pilot officer
(The Bahamas) Bahamas	No air force
Barbados	No air force
Belize Defence Force Air Wing
Belize Defence Force Air Wing										Major	Captain	Lieutenant	Second lieutenant
Botswana Defence Force Air Wing
Botswana Defence Force Air Wing				Major general	Brigadier	Colonel		Lieutenant colonel		Major	Captain	First lieutenant	Second lieutenant
Burundi	No air force
Cameroon Air Force
Cameroon Air Force		Général d'armée aérienne	Général de corps aérien	Général de division aérienne	Général de brigade aérienne	Colonel		Lieutenant-Colonel		Commandant	Capitaine	Lieutenant	Sous-Lieutenant
Royal Canadian Air Force
Royal Canadian Air Force		General	Lieutenant-general	Major-general	Brigadier-general	Colonel		Lieutenant-colonel		Major	Captain	Lieutenant	Second lieutenant
Royal Canadian Air Force		Général(e)	Lieutenant(e)-général(e)	Major(e)-général(e)	Brigadier(ère)-général(e)	Colonel(le)		Lieutenant(e)-colonel(le)		Major(e)	Capitaine	Lieutenant(e)	Sous-lieutenant(e)
Dominica	No air force
Fiji	No air force
(The Gambia) Gambia	No air force
Ghana Air Force
Ghana Air Force		Air chief marshal	Air marshal	Air vice-marshal	Air commodore	Group captain		Wing commander		Squadron leader	Flight lieutenant	Flying officer	Pilot officer
Grenada	No air force
Guyana Air Corps
Guyana Air Corps								Lieutenant Colonel		Major	Captain	Lieutenant	Second lieutenant
Haitian Aviation Corps
Haitian Aviation Corps			Lieutenant général	Major général	Général de brigade	Colonel		Lieutenant-colonel		Major	Capitaine	Lieutenant	Sous-lieutenant
Haitian Aviation Corps			Lyetnan jeneral	Majò jeneral	Jeneral brigad	Kolonèl		Lyetnan kolonèl		Majò	Kapitèn	Lyetnan	Soulyetnan
Indian Air Force
Indian Air Force	Marshal of the Indian Air Force मार्शल ऑफ द इंडियन एयरफोर्स	Air chief marshal एयर चीफ मार्शल	Air marshal एयर मार्शल	Air vice marshal एयर वाइस मार्शल	Air commodore एयर कमोडोर	Group captain ग्रुप कैप्टन		Wing commander विंग कमांडर		Squadron leader स्क्वाड्रन लीडर	Flight lieutenant फ्लाइट लैफ्टिनेंट	Flying officer फ्लाइंग अफसर
Irish Air Corps
Irish Air Corps			Lieutenant-general	Major-general	Brigadier-general	Colonel		Lieutenant-colonel		Commandant	Captain	Lieutenant	Second-lieutenant
Irish Air Corps			Lefteanant-ghinearál	Maor-ghinearál	Briogáidire-ghinearál	Cornal		Lefteanant-chornal		Ceannfort	Captaen	Lefteanant	Dara-lefteanant
Jamaican Air Wing
Jamaican Air Wing								Lieutenant colonel		Major	Captain	First lieutenant	Second lieutenant
Kenya Air Force
Kenya Air Force	Commander-in-Chief	General	Lieutenant general	Major general	Brigadier	Colonel		Lieutenant colonel		Major	Captain	Lieutenant	Second lieutenant
Kiribati	No air force
Lesotho Air Squadron
Lesotho Air Squadron			Lieutenant general	Major general	Brigadier	Colonel		Lieutenant colonel		Major	Captain	First lieutenant	Second lieutenant
Liberian Air Wing
Liberian Air Wing						Colonel		Lieutenant colonel		Major	Captain	Lieutenant	Second lieutenant
Malawi Air Force
Malawi Air Force		General	Lieutenant general	Major general	Brigadier general	Colonel		Lieutenant colonel		Major	Captain	First lieutenant	Second lieutenant
Malian Air Force
Malian Air Force		Général d'armée	Général de corps d'armée	Général de division	Général de brigade	Colonel-major	Colonel	Lieutenant-colonel		Commandant	Capitaine	Lieutenant	Sous-lieutenant
Marshall Islands	No air force
Mauritius	No air force
Federated States of Micronesia	No air force
Namibian Air Force
Namibian Air Force		Chief air marshal	Air marshal	Air vice marshal	Air commodore	Group captain		Wing commander		Squadron leader	Flight lieutenant	Flying officer	Pilot officer
Nauru	No air force
Royal New Zealand Air Force
Royal New Zealand Air Force	Marshal of the RNZAF		Air marshal	Air vice-marshal	Air commodore	Group captain		Wing commander		Squadron leader	Flight lieutenant	Flying officer	Pilot officer
Nigerian Air Force
Nigerian Air Force	Marshal of the air force	Air chief marshal	Air marshal	Air vice-marshal	Air commodore	Group captain		Wing commander		Squadron leader	Flight lieutenant	Flying officer	Pilot officer
Pakistan Air Force
Pakistan Air Force	Marshal of the Pakistan Air Force	Air chief marshal	Air marshal	Air vice marshal	Air commodore	Group captain		Wing commander		Squadron leader	Flight lieutenant	Flying officer	Pilot officer
Pakistan Air Force	سالار فضائیہ	امیرسالار فضائیہ	سالار فضائیہ	سالار فضائیہ مقابل	عَمِيد الفضاء	سردار جماعت		شارف الجناح		قائدِ دستہ	نقیبِ پرواز	منصبِ طیار	منصبِ پائلٹ
Palau	No air force
Papua New Guinea Air Element
Papua New Guinea Air Element						Colonel		Lieutenant colonel		Major	Captain	First lieutenant	Second lieutenant
Papua New Guinea Air Element						Kolonel		Leftenan kolonel		Meja	Kepten	Leftenan	Namba tu leftenan
Philippine Air Force
Philippine Air Force		General	Lieutenant general	Major general	Brigadier general	Colonel		Lieutenant colonel		Major	Captain	First lieutenant	Second lieutenant
Rwandan Air Force
Rwandan Air Force		General	Lieutenant general	Major general	Brigadier general	Colonel		Lieutenant colonel		Major	Captain	Lieutenant	Second lieutenant
Saint Kitts and Nevis	No air force
Saint Lucia	No air force
Saint Vincent and the Grenadines	No air force
Samoa	No air force
Seychelles Air Force
Seychelles Air Force					Brigadier	Colonel		Lieutenant colonel		Major	Captain	Lieutenant	Second lieutenant
Sierra Leone	No air force
Republic of Singapore Air Force		No insignia yet
Republic of Singapore Air Force		General	Lieutenant general	Major general	Brigadier general	Colonel		Senior lieutenant colonel	Lieutenant colonel	Major	Captain	Lieutenant	Second lieutenant
Solomon Islands	No air force
South African Air Force
South African Air Force		General	Lieutenant general	Major general	Brigadier general	Colonel		Lieutenant colonel		Major	Captain	Lieutenant	Second lieutenant
South Sudan Air Force
South Sudan Air Force	Air marshal	General	Lieutenant general	Major general	Brigadier general	Colonel		Lieutenant colonel		Major	Captain	First lieutenant	Second lieutenant
Sudanese Air Force
Sudanese Air Force	مشیر; Mushir	فريق أول; Fariq 'awal	فريق; Fariq	لواء; Liwa	عميد; Amid	عقيد; Aqid		مقدم; Muqaddam		رائد; Ra'id	نقيب; Naqib	ملازم أول; Mulazim awwal	ملازم; Mulazim
Tanzania Air Force
Tanzania Air Force		Jenerali	Luteni jenerali	Meja jenerali	Brigedia jenerali	Kanali		Luteni kanali		Meja	Kapteni	Luteni	Luteni usu
Trinidad and Tobago Air Guard
Trinidad and Tobago Air Guard				Air vice marshal	Air commodore	Group captain		Wing commander		Squadron leader	Flight lieutenant	Flying officer	Pilot officer
Tuvalu	No air force
Ugandan Air Force
Ugandan Air Force		General	Lieutenant general	Major general	Brigadier	Colonel		Lieutenant colonel		Major	Captain	Lieutenant	Second lieutenant
Royal Air Force
Royal Air Force	Marshal of the RAF	Air chief marshal	Air marshal	Air vice-marshal	Air commodore	Group captain		Wing commander		Squadron leader	Flight lieutenant	Flying officer	Pilot officer /acting pilot officer
United States Air Force
United States Air Force	General of the Air Force	General	Lieutenant general	Major general	Brigadier general	Colonel		Lieutenant colonel		Major	Captain	First lieutenant	Second lieutenant
Vanuatu	No air force
Zambian Air Force
Zambian Air Force		General	Lieutenant general	Major general	Brigadier	Colonel		Lieutenant colonel		Major	Captain	Lieutenant	Second lieutenant
Air Force of Zimbabwe
Air Force of Zimbabwe		Air chief marshal	Air marshal	Air vice-marshal	Air commodore	Group captain		Wing commander		Squadron leader	Flight lieutenant	Air lieutenant	Air sub-lieutenant
Rank group	General/Flag/Air officers					Senior officers					Junior officers
