= Ranks and insignia of the officers of the Australian Army =

Distinguishing symbols worn by various officers in the Australian army

Australian Army officers receive a commission from the Governor-General of Australia, who is also the Commander-in-Chief of the Australian Defence Force. The commission is signed by both the Governor-General and the Minister of Defence. Rank insignia for commissioned officers is identical to that of the British Army, with the addition of a band containing the word "Australia" beneath the insignia.

== Ranks and rank grades ==
Officer ranks in the Australian Army are organised into grades for administrative and promotional purposes. The rank grades also give an indication of what that particular officer's role or position may be, although 'rank grade' is not an official term. The ranks are organised below from highest to lowest:

=== Appointed Officer ranks ===
- Governor-General of Australia. This rank is the highest appointed rank in the Australian Army, and is its Commander-in-Chief.
- State Governor. This rank insignia is worn by state governors.
- Field Marshal (Abbreviated: FM) – O11. This rank is generally reserved for wartime and ceremonial purposes; there are no regular appointments to the rank. Four people have been promoted to this rank in the Australian Army: Sir Thomas Blamey; Lord Birdwood; Prince Philip, Duke of Edinburgh; and King Charles III.

=== General Officer ranks ===
- General (Abbreviated: GEN) – O10. Since the end of the Second World War, this rank has only been held when an Army officer is appointed as Chief of the Defence Force.
- Lieutenant General (Abbreviated: LTGEN) – O9. Held by Chief of Army and, when Army officers are appointed to the Joint positions, Vice Chief of the Defence Force, Chief of Joint Operations and Chief of Capability Development.
- Major General (Abbreviated: MAJGEN) – O8.

=== Senior Officer ranks ===
- Brigadier (Abbreviated: BRIG) – O7. Like the United Kingdom, prior to 1922 Australia used the rank Brigadier General. (Note: An Australian brigadier is not classed as a "general", whereas an Australian brigadier general was. The British Army replaced the rank of brigadier general with colonel-commandant in 1922, and then with brigadier in 1928. The rank insignia was changed from crossed sabre and baton to crown with three stars ("pips") to reflect that a brigadier is a senior colonel rather than a junior general. The Australian Army did something similar.)
- Colonel (Abbreviated: COL) – O6.

=== Field Grade Officer ranks ===
- Lieutenant Colonel (Abbreviated: LTCOL) – O5.
- Major (Abbreviated: MAJ) – O4.

=== Company Grade Officer ranks ===
- Captain (Abbreviated: CAPT) – O3.
- Lieutenant (Abbreviated: LT) – O2. (Note: In the Australian Army, lieutenant is pronounced "lef-tenant")
- Second Lieutenant (Abbreviated: 2LT) – O1.

The rank of second lieutenant has been phased out of the Australian Army, with officer recruits now graduating from the Royal Military College, Duntroon with the rank of lieutenant.

=== Officer Trainee rank ===
- Staff Cadet (Abbreviated SCDT)
- Officer Cadet (Abbreviated: OCDT)

==== Cadet rank insignia ====
SCDT and OCDT are equivalent rank titles. The rank of Officer Cadet is given to those who are studying at the Australian Defence Force Academy. Their rank is then changed to Staff Cadet upon entry to the Royal Military College, Duntroon (RMC-D) where they become a part of the Corps of Staff Cadets. Officer cadets wear a 10mm wide white stripe, on a DPCU slide or hard shoulder board, as their rank insignia. Officer Trainees in University Regiments undergoing Army Reserve Officer Training have also been known as Officer Cadets as of November, 2009. Previous to this they administratively belonged to RMC-D and were known as Staff Cadets. Staff Cadets are presently only full-time RMC-D officer trainees. Staff Cadets wear "RMC" on their rank slides in order to distinguish them from other training establishments.

== Officer rank insignia of the Australian Army ==
The insignia worn by officers in the Australian Army use three symbols which are also used in the insignia of the British Army:

- The star, commonly called a 'pip', is derived from the Star of the Knight Grand Cross of the Military Division of the Most Honourable Order of the Bath.
- The crown has varied in the past, with the Tudor Crown being used from 1910 until 1953, when it was replaced by the St Edward's Crown from 1953 until 2025, then changed back to the Tudor Crown from 2025.
- The crossed sword and baton has been in use by generals of the British Army since at least 1800.

=== Insignia ===
Rank insignia of the commissioned officers of the Australian Army
Rank group	Field marshals	General officers			Field officers				Junior officers			Officer cadets
ADF code	O-11	O-10	O-9	O-8	O-7	O-6	O-5	O-4	O-3	O-2	O-1	N/A
Insignia												
Rank	Field marshal	General	Lieutenant-general	Major-general	Brigadier	Colonel	Lieutenant colonel	Major	Captain	Lieutenant	Second lieutenant	Officer cadet (Note: Officer cadets at the Royal Military College, Duntroon, use the honorary title of 'staff cadet')
Abbreviation	FM	GEN	LTGEN	MAJGEN	BRIG	COL	LTCOL	MAJ	CAPT	LT	2LT	OCDT

Viceroy insignia
Governor general	State governor

== Former ranks ==
Rank group	General / flag officers					Senior officers			Junior officers
Australian Army (1953–2025)
Australian Army (1953–2025)	Field marshal	General	Lieutenant general	Major general	Brigadier	Colonel	Lieutenant colonel	Major	Captain	Lieutenant	Second lieutenant

Brigadier General
(abolished 1921) (Note: An Australian brigadier is not considered as a "general", but rather a senior colonel or field officer. In 1921 the British Army replaced the rank of brigadier-general with both Colonel-Commandant and Colonel-of-the-Staff depending on the appointment. These ranks were given the rank insignia of a Crown and three stars (pips). After issues with those ranks arose, particularly the loss of precedent and respect and prestige being equated to a colonel, in 1928 the rank brigadier was introduced and replaced Colonel-Commandant and Colonel-of-the-Staff but retained the same rank insignia to reflect that a brigadier is a senior colonel and field officer, and not a junior general. The Australian Imperial force followed the same order to abolish the brigadier-general rank effective 1 January 1921, and the Australian army followed the same rank structure once efforts to establish a regular infantry force in 1938.)

== See also ==
- Australian Army enlisted rank insignia
- Australian Defence Force ranks
- List of Australian generals and brigadiers
- Uniforms of the Australian Army
