= Ranks and insignia of the Australian Defence Force =

The Australian Defence Force (ADF) utilises ranks for the officers and non-commissioned personnel of its three service branches: the Royal Australian Navy (RAN), the Australian Army, and the Royal Australian Air Force (RAAF). Each of the branches largely inherited the rank structure and rank insignia from their counterparts in the British Armed Forces.

The following tables show the "equivalent rank and classifications" for the three services, as defined in the ADF Pay and Conditions Manual. "Equivalent rank" means the corresponding rank set out under Regulation 8 of the Defence Force Regulations 1952.

== Commissioned officer ranks ==
NATO code	Aus code	Navy	Army	RAAF
Flag/General/Air officers
OF-10	O-11 (Note: O-11 ranks - admiral of the fleet, field marshal and marshal of the RAAF - may only be used in wartime and for honorary appointments.)	Admiral of the Fleet	Field Marshal	Marshal of the RAAF
OF-9	O-10 (Note: O-10 ranks - The Chief of the Defence Force is the sole O-10 ranked appointment.)	Admiral	General	Air Chief Marshal
OF-8	O-9 (Note: O-9 ranks - The Vice chief of the Defence Force, chief of joint operations, chief of the capability development executive and chiefs of the Navy, Army and Air Force comprise the six O-9 ranked appointments.)	Vice Admiral	Lieutenant general	Air Marshal
OF-7	O-8	Rear Admiral	Major General	Air Vice Marshal
OF-6	O-7 (Note: Chaplains: In the Royal Australian Air Force and Australian Army, Chaplains wear normal rank insignia.; O5 ranks - In the Royal Australian Navy, Chaplains and MSWOs are commissioned officers without rank. For reasons of protocol, ceremonial occasions and for saluting purposes, they are, where appropriate, normally grouped with Commanders (O-5).; O6-O7 ranks - The more senior Division 4 Senior Chaplains are grouped with Captains (O-6) and Division 5 Principal Chaplains are grouped with Commodores (O-7).; O8 ranks - The heads of the various churches and religions officially associated to the ADF's Religious Advisory Committee, such as the Anglican and Catholic bishops of the military, are equivalent to a brigadier, air vice marshall, or rear admiral (O-8).)			Air Commodore
Senior officers
OF-6	O-7^{[d]}	Commodore; Principal Chaplain; Principal MSWO	Brigadier	—
OF-5	O-6^{[d]}	Captain (RAN); Senior Chaplain (Class 4); Principal MSWO (Class 4)	Colonel	Group Captain
OF-4	O-5^{[d]}	Commander; Chaplain/MSWO (Div/Class 1-3)	Lieutenant Colonel	Wing Commander
OF-3	O-4^{[d]}	Lieutenant Commander	Major	Squadron Leader
Junior officers
OF-2	O-3^{[d]}	Lieutenant	Captain (Army)	Flight Lieutenant
OF-1	O-2	Sub Lieutenant	Lieutenant	Flying Officer
OF-1	O-1	Acting Sub Lieutenant	Second Lieutenant	Pilot Officer
—	O-0	Midshipman	—	Officer Cadet
Cadets
—	—	—	Officer Cadet/Staff Cadet(RMC)	-

== Warrant Officer ranks ==
NATO code	Aus/ code	Navy	Army	RAAF
Warrant officers
OR-9	E-10	SEAC	SEAC	SEAC
OR-9	E-10	WO-N	RSM-A	WOFF-AF
OR-9	E-9	Warrant Officer	Warrant Officer Class 1	Warrant officer
OR-8	E-8	—	Warrant Officer Class 2	—

Note that the most senior Warrant Officer in each of the three services is appointed and promoted to either Warrant Officer of the Navy (WO-N), Regimental Sergeant Major of the Army (RSM-A), or Warrant Officer of the Air Force (WOFF-AF), as appropriate. Although these are positional appointments, these three members hold the rank of Warrant Officer in their respective services and each wear special insignia, different from the rank insignia worn by other warrant officers.

In 2023 the E10 position of Senior Enlisted Advisor to the Chief of the Defence Force (SEAC) was created. This position can be staffed by a member from any of the three services and is rotational.

The RAN and the RAAF have two warrant officer ranks, the army has three. The soldier appointed Regimental Sergeant Major of the Army (RSM-A) holds the unique Army rank of Warrant Officer (introduced in 1991 and senior to WO1). The Army rank of WO2 is the equivalent of the RAN and the RAAF's most senior NCOs, (i.e. Chief Petty Officer and Flight Sergeant). As Army WO2s hold a Warrant, while the RAN CPO and RAAF FSGT do not, WO2s are addressed as "Sir" or "Ma'am" by junior ranks, which extends to OCDTs and SCDTs.

== Non-Commissioned Officer ranks ==
NATO code	Aus code	Navy	Army	RAAF
Senior non-commissioned officers
OR-8	E-8	Chief Petty Officer	—	Flight Sergeant
OR-7	E-7	—	Staff Sergeant (Note: Without prejudice to existing holders of the rank, the Army has ceased to promote soldiers to the rank of staff sergeant.)	—
OR-6	E-6	Petty Officer	Sergeant	Sergeant
Junior non-commissioned officers
OR-5	E-5	Leading Seaman	Corporal/Bombardier	Corporal
OR-4	E-4	—	Lance Corporal/Bombardier	—

== Other ranks ==
NATO Code	Aus Code	Navy	Army	RAAF
Enlisted
OR-3	E-3	Able Seaman	Private proficient (Note: Private proficient is not an ADF rank. It is a proficiency point for which a higher rate of salary is provided.)	Leading Aircraftman/Leading Aircraftwoman
OR-2	E-2	Seaman	Private	Aircraftman/Aircraftwoman

== Insignia ==
=== Commissioned officer ranks ===
The rank insignia of commissioned officers.

Rank group	General / flag officers					Senior officers			Junior officers
Royal Australian Navy
Royal Australian Navy	Admiral of the fleet	Admiral	Vice admiral	Rear admiral	Commodore	Captain	Commander	Lieutenant commander	Lieutenant	Sub lieutenant	Acting sub lieutenant
Australian Army
Australian Army	Field marshal	General	Lieutenant general	Major general	Brigadier	Colonel	Lieutenant colonel	Major	Captain	Lieutenant	Second lieutenant
Royal Australian Air Force
Royal Australian Air Force	Marshal of the RAAF	Air chief marshal	Air marshal	Air vice-marshal	Air commodore	Group captain	Wing commander	Squadron leader	Flight lieutenant	Flying officer	Pilot officer
Rank group	General / flag officers					Senior officers			Junior officers

==== Student officer ranks ====
Rank group	Student officer
Royal Australian Navy
Royal Australian Navy	Midshipman
Australian Army
Australian Army	Officer cadet	Staff cadet
Royal Australian Air Force
Royal Australian Air Force	Officer cadet

=== Other ranks ===
The rank insignia of non-commissioned officers and enlisted personnel.

Rank group	Senior NCOs			Junior NCOs		Enlisted
Royal Australian Navy
Royal Australian Navy	Warrant officer	Chief petty officer	Petty officer	Leading seaman		Able seaman	Seaman
Australian Army						No insignia
Australian Army	Warrant officer class 1	Warrant officer class 2	Sergeant	Corporal	Lance corporal	Private (or equivalent)
Royal Australian Air Force
Royal Australian Air Force	Warrant officer	Flight sergeant	Sergeant	Corporal		Leading aircraftman/ aircraftwoman	Aircraftman/ aircraftwoman
Rank group	Senior NCOs			Junior NCOs		Enlisted

==== Appointments ====
Rank group	Senior appointments
Royal Australian Navy
Royal Australian Navy	Warrant Officer of the Navy
Australian Army
Australian Army	Regimental sergeant major of the army
Royal Australian Air Force
Royal Australian Air Force	Warrant Officer of the Air Force

== History of Royal Australian Navy ranks ==
The historical changes to rank insignia for enlisted personnel of the navy.

Rank group	General/flag officers					Senior officers			Junior officers
Royal Australian Navy (1995–2025)
Royal Australian Navy (1995–2025)	Admiral of the fleet	Admiral	Vice admiral	Rear admiral	Commodore	Captain	Commander	Lieutenant commander	Lieutenant	Sub lieutenant	Acting sub lieutenant

Rank group	Senior NCOs					Junior NCOs	Enlisted
Royal Navy (1827–1853)							No insignia
Royal Navy (1827–1853)				Petty officer 1st class	Petty officer 2nd class		Able seaman	Ordinary seaman
Royal Navy (1853–1890)							No insignia
Royal Navy (1853–1890)			Chief petty officer	Petty officer 1st class	Petty officer 2nd class	Leading seaman	Able seaman	Ordinary seaman
Royal Navy (1890–1901)			Arm badge replaced by lapel badges				No insignia
Royal Navy (1890–1901)			Chief petty officer	Petty officer 1st class	Petty officer 2nd class	Leading seaman	Able seaman	Ordinary seaman
Rank group	Senior NCOs					Junior NCOs	Enlisted
(Australia) Royal Australian Navy (1901–1907)			Arm badge replaced by lapel badges				No insignia
(Australia) Royal Australian Navy (1901–1907)			Chief petty officer	Petty officer 1st class	Petty officer 2nd class	Leading seaman	Able seaman	Ordinary seaman
(Australia) Royal Australian Navy (1907–1925)			Arm badge replaced by lapel badges				No insignia
(Australia) Royal Australian Navy (1907–1925)			Chief petty officer	Petty officer		Leading seaman	Able seaman	Ordinary seaman
(Australia) Royal Australian Navy (1925–1953)			Three cuff buttons				No insignia
(Australia) Royal Australian Navy (1925–1953)			Chief petty officer	Petty officer		Leading seaman	Able seaman	Ordinary seaman
Rank group	Senior NCOs					Junior NCOs	Enlisted
(Australia) Royal Australian Navy (1953–1966)							No insignia
(Australia) Royal Australian Navy (1953–1966)			Chief petty officer	Petty officer		Leading seaman	Able seaman	Ordinary seaman
Royal Australian Navy (1966–1971)							No insignia
Royal Australian Navy (1966–1971)			Chief petty officer	Petty officer		Leading seaman	Able seaman	Ordinary seaman
Royal Australian Navy (1971–1974)							No insignia
Royal Australian Navy (1971–1974)	Warrant officer		Chief petty officer	Petty officer		Leading seaman	Able seaman	Ordinary seaman
Rank group	Senior NCOs					Junior NCOs	Enlisted
Royal Australian Navy (1974–1991)							No insignia
Royal Australian Navy (1974–1991)	Warrant officer		Chief petty officer	Petty officer		Leading seaman	Able seaman	Seaman
Royal Australian Navy (1991–1993)
Royal Australian Navy (1991–1993)	Warrant officer		Chief petty officer	Petty officer		Leading seaman	Able seaman	Seaman
Royal Australian Navy (1993–2025)
Royal Australian Navy (1993–2025)	Warrant Officer of the Navy	Warrant officer	Chief petty officer	Petty officer		Leading seaman	Able seaman	Seaman
Royal Australian Navy (2025–present)			TBU	TBU
Royal Australian Navy (2025–present)	Warrant Officer of the Navy	Warrant officer	Chief petty officer	Petty officer		Leading seaman	Able seaman	Seaman
Rank group	Senior NCOs					Junior NCOs	Enlisted

== History of Australian Army ranks ==
Rank group	General / flag officers					Senior officers			Junior officers
Australian Army (1953–2025)
Australian Army (1953–2025)	Field marshal	General	Lieutenant general	Major general	Brigadier	Colonel	Lieutenant colonel	Major	Captain	Lieutenant	Second lieutenant

Rank group	Senior NCOs					Junior NCOs		Enlisted
Australian Army (–2019)								No insignia
Australian Army (–2019)	Regimental sergeant major of the army	Warrant officer class 1	Warrant officer class 2	Staff sergeant (Note: Staff sergeants still exist, but no one is promoted into the role.)	Sergeant	Corporal	Lance corporal	Private (or equivalent)
Australian Army (2019–2025)								No insignia
Australian Army (2019–2025)	Regimental sergeant major of the army	Warrant officer class 1	Warrant officer class 2		Sergeant	Corporal	Lance corporal	Private (or equivalent)

== See also ==
- Ranks and insignia of NATO
- British Army officer rank insignia
- New Zealand military ranks
