= Admiral of the fleet (Australia) =

Rank in the Royal Australian Navy

- Shoulder and sleeve insignia
- Country: Australia
- Service branch: Royal Australian Navy
- Abbreviation: AF
- Rank group: General officer
- Rank: Five-star
- Non-NATO rank: OF-10
- Pay grade: O-11
- Formation: 2 June 1938 (ceremonial)
- Next lower rank: Admiral
- Equivalent ranks: Field marshal (Army); Marshal of the Air Force (RAAF)

Admiral of the fleet (AF) is the highest rank in the Royal Australian Navy (RAN) and is currently held by Charles III, King of Australia. The rank of Admiral of the fleet is a ceremonial, not active or operational, rank. It equates to the NATO rank grade OF-10. Equivalent ranks in the other services of the Australian Defence Force are field marshal and marshal of the Royal Australian Air Force. Like those ranks, admiral of the fleet is a five-star rank.

The subordinate naval rank, and highest active rank in the RAN, is admiral. This rank is only held when the Chief of the Defence Force is a naval officer. The highest continuously filled rank in the RAN is vice admiral, held by the Chief of Navy.

== History ==
The rank evolved from the ancient sailing days and the admiral distinctions then used by the Royal Navy. The British fleet was divided into three divisions and each designated a colour, that of red, white, or blue. Each coloured division was assigned an admiral, who in turn had command over a vice admiral and a rear admiral. In the 18th century, the original nine ranks began to be filled by more than one person per rank. The admiral of the fleet commanded the admirals of the various divisions and thus, the entirety of the British fleet.

The organisation of the British fleet into coloured squadrons was abandoned in 1864, with the Royal Navy keeping the White Ensign. By this time, the position admiral of the fleet had already become an honorary promotion; when the position of professional head of the Royal Navy was given the name of First Naval Lord in 1828 (renamed First Sea Lord in 1904), admiral of the fleet became an honorary promotion for retiring First Naval Lords. This allowed multiple honorary admirals of the fleet to co-exist throughout the history of the rank. With the establishment of the Royal Australian Navy in 1911, the navy inherited the same ranks as its Royal Navy predecessor. However, with the highest ranks remaining the traditional reserve as a wartime rank and did not take on the regular honorary appointments that its British counterpart did until 1996.

== Admirals of the Fleet (Royal Australian Navy) ==
Appointed	Name	Born	Died	
2 June 1938	King George VI	1895	1952	King of Australia
1 April 1954	Prince Philip, Duke of Edinburgh	1921	2021	Consort to Queen Elizabeth II of Australia
19 October 2024	King Charles III	1948	Living	King of Australia

== See also ==
- Ranks of the Royal Australian Navy
- Australian Defence Force ranks and insignia
