= Major general (Australia) =

Senior rank of the Australian Army

- The MAJGEN insignia of Order of the Bath (pip) above a crossed sword and baton, with the word 'Australia' at the bottom.
- Country: Australia
- Service branch: Australian Army
- Abbreviation: MAJGEN
- Rank: Two-star
- NATO rank code: OF-7
- Non-NATO rank: O-8
- Next higher rank: Lieutenant general
- Next lower rank: Brigadier
- Equivalent ranks: Rear admiral (RAN); Air vice-marshal (RAAF)

Major general (abbreviated MAJGEN) is a senior rank of the Australian Army, and was created as a direct equivalent of the British military rank of major general. It is the third-highest active rank of the Australian Army (the rank of field marshal not being held by any currently serving officer), and is considered to be equivalent to a two-star rank. A major general commands a division or the equivalent.

Major general is a higher rank than brigadier, but lower than lieutenant general. (Note: Many people are confused that "major general" is a lower rank than "lieutenant general", because they expect it to reflect that "major" is higher rank than "lieutenant". The reason is that the title "major general" is derived from "sergeant major general" while "lieutenant" means deputy.) Major general is the equivalent of rear admiral in the Royal Australian Navy and air vice marshal in the Royal Australian Air Force.

The insignia for a major general is the star (or 'pip') of the Order of the Bath (despite membership of the Order no longer being awarded to Australians), above a crossed Mameluke sword and baton. (Note: Australian Army officer rank insignia are identical to British Army officer rank insignia, with the difference that Australian insignia have the word "Australia" below them.)

== See also ==
- Australian Defence Force ranks and insignia
- Australian Army officer rank insignia
- List of Australian Army generals
