= General (Australia) =

Military rank of Australia

- The GEN insignia of the Tudor Crown above a star of the Order of the Bath above a crossed sword and baton, with the word 'Australia' at the bottom.
- Country: Australia
- Service branch: Australia
- Abbreviation: GEN
- Rank: Four-star
- NATO rank code: OF-9
- Non-NATO rank: O-10
- Formation: 1917
- Next higher rank: Field marshal
- Next lower rank: Lieutenant general
- Equivalent ranks: Admiral (RAN); Air chief marshal (RAAF)

General (abbreviated GEN) is the second-highest rank, and the highest active rank, of the Australian Army and was created as a direct equivalent of the British military rank of general; it is also considered a four-star rank.

Prior to 1958, Australian generals (and field marshals) were only appointed in exceptional circumstances. In 1958, the position which is currently called Chief of the Defence Force was created, and since 1966, the rank of general has been held when an army officer is appointed to that position.

General is a higher rank than lieutenant general, but is lower than field marshal. General is the equivalent of admiral in the Royal Australian Navy and air chief marshal in the Royal Australian Air Force.

A general's insignia is St Edward's Crown above a star of the Order of the Bath (or 'pip') above a crossed sword and baton, with the word 'Australia' at the bottom. (Note: Australian Army officer rank insignia are identical to British Army officer rank insignia, with the difference that Australian Army insignia have the word "Australia" below them.)

== Australian generals ==
This along with the * (asterisk) indicates that the officer was subsequently promoted to field marshal.
This along with the + (plus sign) indicates that the officer was promoted to the honorary rank of general.

The following have held the rank of general in the Australian Army:

Name	Date promoted	Senior command(s) or appointment(s) in rank	Notes
Sir William Birdwood+	29 January 1920	General Officer Commanding Australian Imperial Force (1915–20)	(Note: When Birdwood was promoted to field marshal in the British Army in 1925, he was given the honorary rank of field marshal in the Australian Army.)
Sir Harry Chauvel	11 November 1929	Inspector-in-Chief Volunteer Defence Corps (1940–45), Chief of the General Staff (1923–30)	
Sir John Monash	11 November 1929 (Note: Monash had transferred to the Unattached List in 1920.)		
Sir Brudenell White	18 March 1940	Chief of the General Staff (1920–23, 1940)	
Sir Thomas Blamey*	24 September 1941	Commander of Allied Land Forces, South West Pacific Area (1942–45), General Officer Commanding-in-Chief Australian Military Forces (1942–45), Deputy Commander-in-Chief Middle East Command (1941–1942)	
Sir John Wilton	1 September 1968	Chairman, Chiefs of Staff Committee (1966–70)	
Sir Frank Hassett	24 November 1975	Chief of the Defence Force Staff (1976–77), Chairman, Chiefs of Staff Committee (1975–76)	
Sir Arthur MacDonald	21 April 1977	Chief of the Defence Force Staff (1977–79)	
Sir Phillip Bennett	13 April 1984	Chief of the Defence Force (1984–87)	
Peter Gration	1987	Chief of the Defence Force (1987–93)	
John Baker	1995	Chief of the Defence Force (1995–98)	
Sir Peter Cosgrove	2002	Chief of the Defence Force (2002–05)	
David Hurley	2011	Chief of the Defence Force (2011–14)	
Angus Campbell	2018	Chief of the Defence Force (2018–24)	

In addition, Sir John Northcott held the honorary rank of general while acting as Governor-General of Australia in 1951 and 1956. The Australian-born Sir John Hackett also attained the rank of general in the British Army.

== See also ==
- Australian Defence Force ranks and insignia
- Australian Army officer rank insignia
- List of Australian Army generals
