= Air commodore =

Air officer rank

Air commodore (Air Cdre or Air Cmde) is an air officer rank used by some air forces, with origins from the Royal Air Force. The rank is also used by the air forces of many countries which have historical British influence and it is sometimes used as the English translation of an equivalent rank in countries which have a non-English air force-specific rank structure.

Air commodore is immediately senior to group captain and immediately subordinate to air vice-marshal. It is usually equivalent to a commodore or a brigadier/brigadier general.

The equivalent rank in the Women's Auxiliary Air Force, Women's Royal Air Force (until 1968) and Princess Mary's Royal Air Force Nursing Service (until 1980) was "air commandant".

== Canada ==
The rank was used in the Royal Canadian Air Force (RCAF) until the 1968 unification of the Canadian Forces, when army-type rank titles were adopted. Canadian air commodores then became brigadier-generals. In official Canadian French usage, the rank title was commodore de l'air. The position of honorary air commodore still exists in the Royal Canadian Air Cadets.

== United Kingdom ==
Air Commodore
- Shoulder board and sleeve insignia

- Masthead distinguishing flag

- Motor car star plate
- Country: United Kingdom
- Service branch: Royal Air Force
- Abbreviation: Air Cdre / AIRCDRE
- Rank group: Officers of air rank
- Rank: One-star rank
- NATO rank code: OF-6
- Formation: 1 August 1919
- Next higher rank: Air vice-marshal
- Next lower rank: Group captain
- Equivalent ranks: Commodore (RN); Brigadier (British Army; RM)

In the present-day RAF, air commodores typically hold senior appointments within groups, acting directly in support of the air officer commanding. However, during the inter-war period, and in the case of the contemporary No. 83 Expeditionary Air Group, the air officer commanding held or holds air commodore rank. In the Air Training Corps, an appointed air commodore holds ultimate authority over the cadet organisation as the Commandant Air Cadets.

=== Origins ===
On 1 April 1918, the newly created RAF adopted its officer rank titles from the British Army, with officers at what is now air commodore holding the rank of brigadier-general. In response to the proposal that the RAF should use its own rank titles, it was suggested that the RAF might use the Royal Navy's officer ranks, with the word "air" inserted before the naval rank title. Although the Admiralty objected to this simple modification of their rank titles, it was agreed that the RAF might base many of its officer rank titles on Navy officer ranks with differing pre-modifying terms. It was also suggested that air-officer ranks could be based on the term "ardian", which was derived from a combination of the Gaelic words for "chief" (ard) and "bird" (eun), with the term "fourth ardian" or "flight ardian" being used for the equivalent to brigadier-general and commodore. However, the rank title based on the Navy rank was preferred and air commodore was adopted in August 1919.

=== RAF insignia, command flag and star plate ===
The rank insignia is a light-blue band on a broad black band worn on both the lower sleeves of the tunic or on the shoulders of the flying suit or the casual uniform. On the mess uniform, air commodores wear a broad gold ring on both lower sleeves.

The command flag of an air commodore has one narrow red band running through the centre and is rectangular with a cut-away section giving it two tails. It is the only RAF command flag of this shape and it is similar in shape to that of a Royal Navy commodore's broad pennant. The vehicle star plate for an air commodore depicts a single white star (air commodore is equivalent to a one-star rank) on an air force blue background. RAF air commodores are classed as air officers and as such have two rows of gold oak leaves on the peak of their service dress hats.

An RAF air commodore's sleeve mess insignia

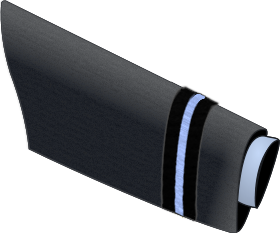
An RAF air commodore's sleeve on No. 1 service dress uniform

An air commodore's command flag

=== Honorary air commodores, air commodores-in-chief and air commandants ===
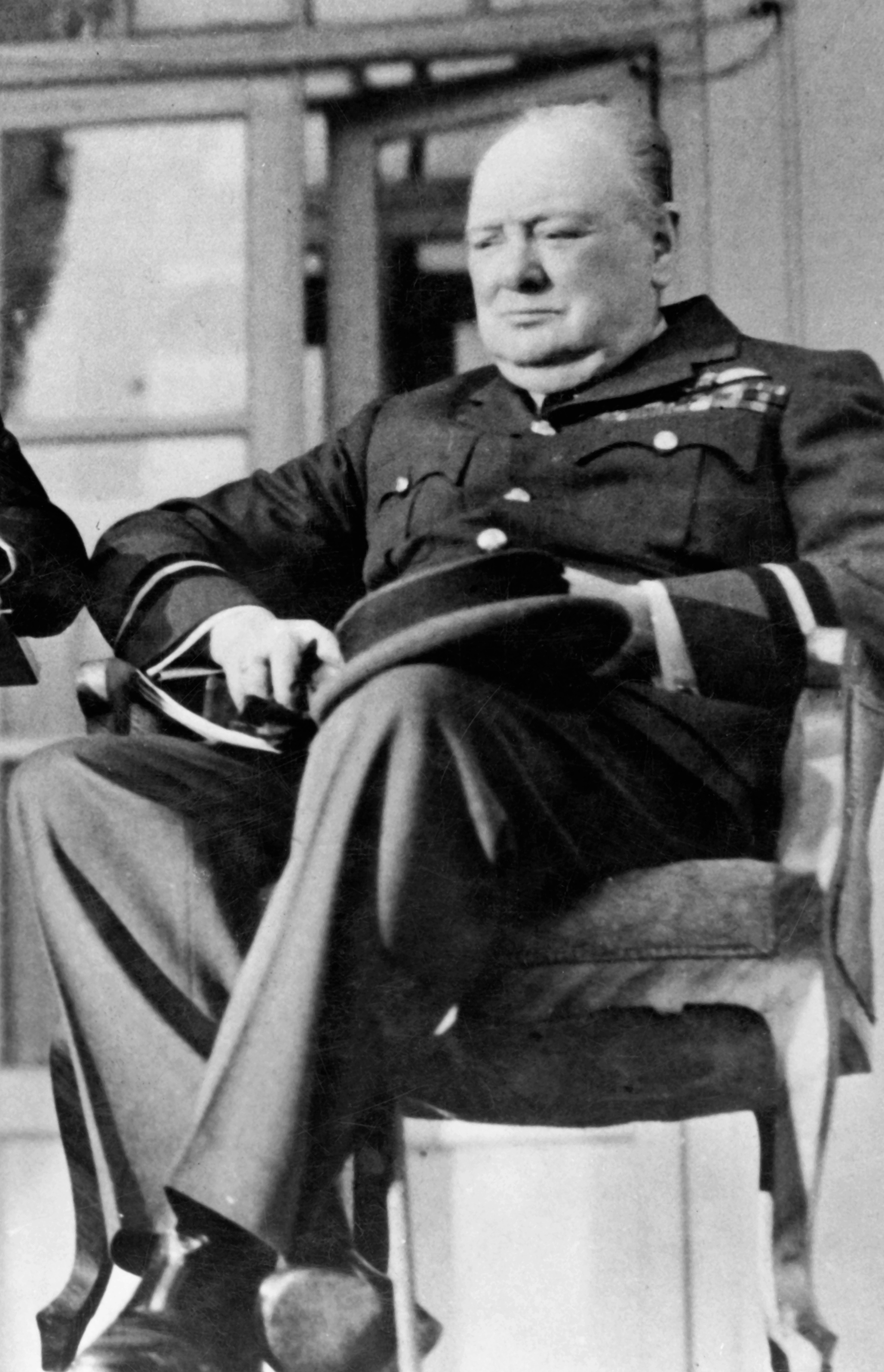
Churchill in his air commodore's uniform at the 1943 Tehran Conference

The reigning monarch may appoint honorary air commodores for RAF flying squadrons and stations. For example, Prince William is RAF Valley's honorary air commodore and Winston Churchill was 615 Squadron's honorary air commodore. As the title suggests, this is an honorary position bestowed by the reigning monarch and it does not grant the recipient command of a unit or formation. It is designed to strengthen the bond between the military unit and the individual and promote the role of the air force among the public.

Serving officers may be granted an equivalent appointment to the honorary rank. In such cases the individual is made an honorary air commandant and they retain their regular rank.

Larger air force organisations or formations may be honoured by having an air commodore-in-chief appointed in their name. These RAF appointments are rare and to date (2020) have been given to just five senior members of the royal family, of whom three were reigning or future monarchs of the United Kingdom. Air commodore-in-chief is not a rank and such an appointment does not convey the rank of air commodore upon the recipient.

== Gallery ==
(Royal Australian Air Force)

(Bangladesh Air Force)

(Ghana Air Force)

(Indian Air Force)

(Namibian Air Force)

(Nigerian Air Force)

(Pakistan Air Force)

(Sri Lanka Air Force)

(Royal Air Force)

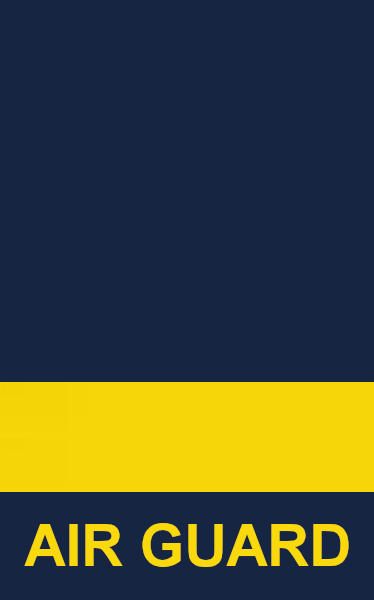
(Trinidad and Tobago Air Guard)

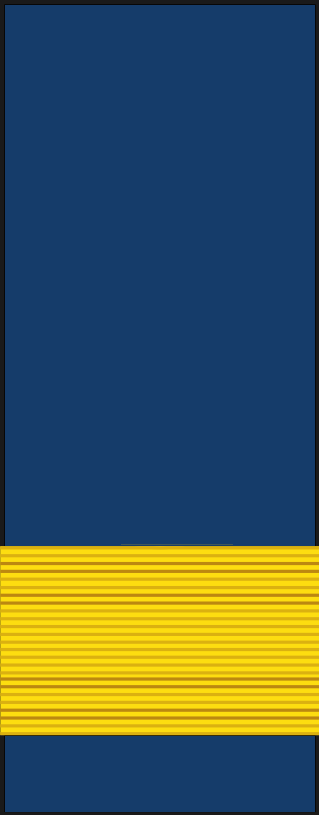
(Air Force of Zimbabwe)

== See also ==
- Air force officer rank insignia
- Comparison of United Kingdom and United States military ranks
- List of comparative military ranks
- RAF officer ranks
- Ranks of the Royal Australian Air Force
