= Marshal of the Royal Australian Air Force =

Rank in Royal Australian Air Force

- The MRAAF insignia
- Country: Australia
- Service branch: Royal Australian Air Force
- Abbreviation: MRAAF
- Rank: Five-star
- NATO rank code: OF-10
- Non-NATO rank: O-11
- Formation: 2 June 1938 (honorary)
- Next lower rank: Air chief marshal
- Equivalent ranks: Admiral of the Fleet (RAN); Field marshal (Army)

Marshal of the Royal Australian Air Force (MRAAF) is the highest rank of the Royal Australian Air Force, and is currently held by Charles III, King of Australia. The rank was created as a direct equivalent of the British Royal Air Force rank of Marshal of the Royal Air Force. It is considered a five-star rank.

It has been awarded only three times, each time as an honorary rank to a senior member of the royal family. On 2 June 1938, King George VI assumed the rank which he held until his death in 1952. Two years later, the Duke of Edinburgh was granted the rank. He was present at the 50th anniversary celebrations of the Royal Australian Air Force in March 1971 as a Marshal of the RAAF; and continued to hold the rank until his death in 2021. Most recently it was granted to King Charles III during a visit to Australia in October 2024.

Marshal of the Royal Australian Air Force is a higher rank than air chief marshal. Marshal of the Royal Australian Air Force is a direct equivalent of admiral of the fleet in the Royal Australian Navy and field marshal in the Australian Army.

The insignia is four light blue bands (each on a slightly wider black band) over a light blue band on a black broad band.

== Marshals of the Royal Australian Air Force ==
Appointed	Name	Born	Died	Notes
2 June 1938	King George VI	14 December 1895	6 February 1952	King of Australia
1 April 1954	Prince Philip, Duke of Edinburgh	10 June 1921	9 April 2021	Consort to HM Queen Elizabeth II of Australia
19 October 2024	King Charles III	14 November 1948	Living	King of Australia

== See also ==
- Ranks of the RAAF
- Australian Defence Force ranks and insignia
- Air force officer rank insignia
