= Field marshal (Australia) =

Rank in Australian Army

Field Marshal
- The FM insignia of the Tudor Crown mounted above two crossed batons that are circled by a wreath of oak leaves.

- Charles III, King of Australia, is the only current Field Marshal of the Australian Army, appointed in 2024.

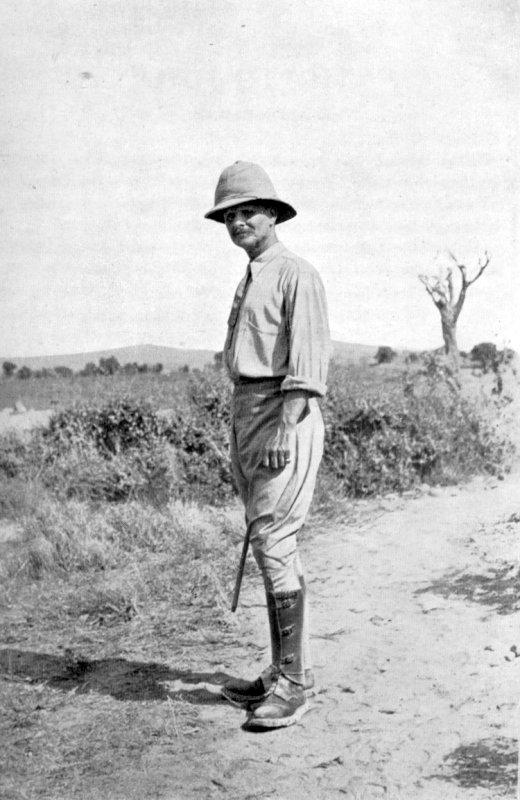
- Australia's first appointed field marshal (honorary), the then Lieutenant General Sir William Birdwood, photographed near Hill 60, Gallipoli. Photograph by C.E.W. Bean, October 1915.
- Country: Australia
- Service branch: Australian Army
- Abbreviation: FM
- Rank: Five star
- NATO rank code: OF-10
- Non-NATO rank: O-11
- Formation: 1925
- Next lower rank: General
- Equivalent ranks: Admiral of the Fleet (RAN); Marshal of the Air Force (RAAF)

Field marshal is the highest rank of the Australian Army, and is currently held by Charles III, King of Australia. The rank was created as a direct equivalent of the British military rank of field marshal. It is a five-star rank, equivalent to the ranks in the other armed services of Admiral of the Fleet in the Royal Australian Navy, and Marshal of the Royal Australian Air Force. The subordinate army rank is general.

Three of the five field marshals were honorary appointments to members of the Royal Family and one an honorary appointment to a British Army officer. The only Australian appointed was Sir Thomas Blamey, who was on the retired list when he was proposed for the rank. Blamey was recalled to active duty and promoted.

== Appointed field marshals ==
=== Lord Birdwood, 1925 ===
Field Marshal Sir William Birdwood (later created The 1st Baron Birdwood) was a British Army officer who commanded the Australian Imperial Force (AIF) in the First World War. As such, he was made a general in the AIF in 1917, and in the Australian Army in 1920. When he was promoted to the rank of field marshal in the British Army on 20 March 1925, Birdwood was also made an honorary field marshal in the Australian Military Forces. He held the rank until his death on 17 May 1951, and his baton is kept in the Australian War Memorial.

=== King George VI, 1938 ===
King George VI was appointed a field marshal in the Australian Army on 2 June 1938.

=== Sir Thomas Blamey, 1950 ===
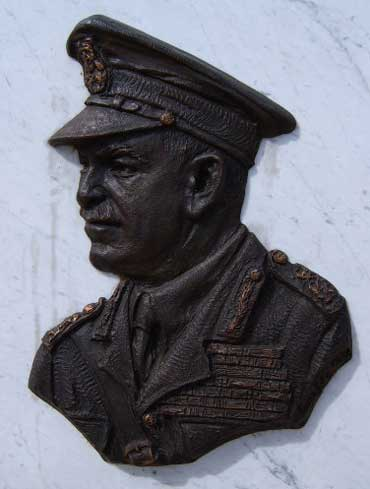
Field Marshal Sir Thomas Blamey – Relief from Blamey Square, Canberra.

Field Marshal Sir Thomas Blamey was the first, and so-far is the only, Australian-born field marshal of the Australian Army. He was promoted to the rank on the insistence of the then Australian Prime Minister, Sir Robert Menzies. Blamey served in the First World War in the First Australian Imperial Force (AIF), from the horrors of trench warfare at the ANZAC positions at Gallipoli to duties as chief of staff to Lieutenant General Sir John Monash, Commander of the Australian Corps in France and Belgium. Blamey attained the rank of brigadier general by the war's end. During the inter-war years he served as chief commissioner of the Victoria Police. During the 1920s and 1930s he expressed public concern over the state of the Australian Military Forces due to financial restrictions brought about by the Great Depression.

During the Second World War he commanded the 2nd Australian Imperial Force. He was promoted to general in 1941 and became Commander-in-Chief of the Australian Military Forces and Commander of Allied Land Forces in the South West Pacific Area under the overall command of United States General Douglas MacArthur. Blamey attended Japan's ceremonial surrender in Tokyo Bay on 3 September 1945 and signed the Instrument of Surrender on behalf of Australia. He later personally accepted the Japanese surrender at Morotai. In his address to the surrendering Japanese commander, Blamey declared: "...in receiving your surrender, I do not recognise you as an honourable and gallant foe...". This speech is also on display in the Australian War Memorial, Canberra.

It is a common but erroneous belief that the then British Chief of the Imperial General Staff (CIGS), Sir William Slim, himself a field marshal (and later Governor-General of Australia), resisted Menzies' recommendation for Blamey's promotion, on the grounds that Dominion generals could not be made field marshals. At the time, the CIGS was the final authority in the entire British Empire, including the then British Commonwealth, for such promotions. The various statutes and declarations from the Balfour doctrine of 1926 meant that it was Australia's decision. Slim was never consulted on the matter. The protocol for making many of these decisions was set as early as the Report of the Inter-Imperial Relations Committee of the Imperial Conference 1926, which read: "It is the right of the Government of each Dominion to advise the Crown on all matters relating to its own affairs. Consequently, it would not be in accordance with constitutional practice for advice to be tendered to His Majesty by His Majesty's Government ... [on a Dominion matter] against the views of the Government of that Dominion". Sir William Slim was not the arbiter of such promotions even in the United Kingdom as promotion to field marshal is a Royal appointment. The concerns came from the palace as there was a concern that other retired officers might lobby for a field marshal's baton. Menzies wanted the King to sign off on the promotion so that Blamey would count not just as an Australian field marshal but a British one too. Canberra thought that the opposition was based on Blamey's dominion status and Menzies pointed out that Field Marshal Jan Smuts was a Dominion general.

Sir Alan Lascelles countered by saying (untruthfully) that Blamey was a retired officer, and retired officers could not be promoted to field marshal. Menzies got around this restriction by recalling Blamey from retirement. Blamey was, at the time of his promotion, seriously ill and mostly bed-ridden in the Heidelberg Repatriation Hospital. He was promoted to field marshal in the King's Birthday Honours of 8 June 1950, and was presented with his field marshal's baton at a ceremony held in the hospital's sun room by the then governor-general, Sir William McKell. Field Marshal Blamey died after a long illness on 27 May 1951.

==== Baton ====
Blamey's field marshal's baton is on display in the Second World War galleries at the Australian War Memorial in Canberra. It is about 40 centimetres (16 inches) long and at its top has a golden mount with two rings of roses, thistles and shamrocks surmounted by a miniature figure of Saint George mounted on his horse and battling a dragon with his lance. The miniature is about 8 centimetres (3 inches) high. The shaft of the baton is covered in scarlet velvet inlaid with a succession of golden lions passant along its length and around its circumference. The pommel (bottom end) of the baton is ornate solid gold with the details of the presentation to Blamey engraved on the base. It is identical to those of all field marshals of the United Kingdom since The 1st Duke of Wellington in 1813, all of which have been made by the same firm, R. & S. Garrard & Co, Crown Jewellers, of London. The design is based upon that of the Marshal of France, the baton of Marshal Jean-Baptiste Jourdan captured by Wellington at Battle of Vitoria being used as a model. Blamey also appears in the list of field marshals of the British Army.

=== Prince Philip, Duke of Edinburgh, 1954 ===
Most recently, the Australian field marshal that was not the sovereign was the father of the current sovereign, Prince Philip, Duke of Edinburgh, who was promoted to the rank of field marshal in the Australian Army on 1 April 1954—over a year after he attained that rank in the British Army on 15 January 1953. (He did not, in fact, become a British prince until 1957.) However, as consort of Queen Elizabeth II, Philip's rank was purely ceremonial—he had no command or control role in the Australian Defence Force (ADF), and was not part of the ADF's operational structure.

He first paraded in Australia in field marshal's uniform, complete with baton, in Canberra on 17 February 1954 when he and the Queen attended a meeting of 4,000 Australian ex-servicemen in front of (Old) Parliament House. At the base of the memorial statue of King George V, the royal couple were greeted by presidents of ex-service organisations, after which they talked to 100 disabled men and proceeded to slowly drive through the ranks. Later the same day, the prince wore the uniform when he attended the presentation of new colours ceremony at the Royal Military College Duntroon, conducted by the Queen. During the proceedings, described in contemporary accounts as "poignant" and "spectacular", the new colours replaced those presented to the Royal Military College on the same parade ground by her late father King George VI in 1927 (then the Duke of York).

=== King Charles III, 2024 ===
King Charles III was appointed field marshal of the Australian Army (as well as marshal of the Royal Australian Air Force and admiral of the fleet of the Royal Australian Navy) on 19 October 2024 during his first visit to Australia as sovereign.

== Current protocol ==
Governor-general's rank insignia

Only the Governor-General of Australia, as Commander-in-Chief of the Australian Defence Force, and by convention on the recommendation of the prime minister of Australia, can appoint officers to the rank of field marshal. The badge of rank is St. Edward's Crown mounted above two crossed batons that are circled by a wreath of oak leaves.

Other than the King, the most senior rank held in the Australian Army is general, which is held by the Chief of the Defence Force (when filled by an Army officer). The most senior appointment within the nominal Army organisation (excluding Chief of the Defence Force) is the Chief of Army at the rank of lieutenant general. Other three-star positions potentially available to Australian Army officers are Vice Chief of the Defence Force (VCDF), Chief of Joint Operations (CJOPS), Chief of Joint Capabilities (CJC) and Chief of Personnel (CP).

== See also ==
- Australian Defence Force ranks and insignia
- Australian Army officer rank insignia
- List of Australian generals and brigadiers
