= Air chief marshal (Australia) =

Rank of the Royal Australian Air Force

- Rank Insignia for Air Chief Marshal

- RAAF ACM Command Flag (CDF)
- Country: Australia
- Service branch: Royal Australian Air Force
- Abbreviation: ACM
- Rank group: Air officer
- Rank: Four-star
- Pay grade: O10
- Formation: 1965
- Next higher rank: Marshal of the RAAF
- Next lower rank: Air marshal
- Equivalent ranks: Admiral (RAN); General (Army)

Air chief marshal (abbreviated as ACM) is the highest active rank of the Royal Australian Air Force and was created as a direct equivalent of the British Royal Air Force rank of air chief marshal. It is also considered a four-star rank. The only time the rank is held is when the Chief of the Defence Force is an Air Force officer.

Air chief marshal is a higher rank than air marshal and is a lower rank than Marshal of the Royal Australian Air Force, which has only ever been awarded as an honorary rank. Air chief marshal is a direct equivalent of admiral in the Royal Australian Navy and general in the Australian Army.

== Insignia ==
The insignia worn on the uniform is three light blue bands (each on a slightly wider black band) over a light blue band on a black broad band.

Australian air chief marshals may also fly an officer distinguishing flag. For air chief marshals this comprises five horizontal stripes which from top to bottom are coloured: dark blue, light blue, red (double thickness), light blue and dark blue with four stars imposed in a line on the red stripe.

== Australian air chief marshals ==
With the establishment of the Australian Air Board on 9 November 1920, Australian Air Corps officers dropped their army ranks in favour of those based on the Royal Air Force. However, it was not until 1965, when Frederick Scherger became Chairman of the Chiefs of Staff Committee and was promoted to air chief marshal, that an RAAF officer attained the rank.

Throughout the history of the RAAF, only four of its officers have held the rank:

Name	Postnominals	Promoted	Retired	Died
Sir Frederick Scherger	KBE, CB, DSO, AFC	1961	18 May 1966	16 January 1984
Sir Neville McNamara	KBE, AO, AFC, AE	1982	1984	7 May 2014
Sir Angus Houston	AK, AFC	2005	3 July 2011	living
Mark Binskin	AC	30 June 2014	2018	living

== See also ==
- Air Chief Marshal, rank for other Commonwealth air forces
- Ranks of the RAAF
- Australian Defence Force ranks and insignia
- Air force officer rank insignia
- Douglas Evill, an Australian born officer who reached the rank of air chief marshal in the RAF
- Charles Burnett (RAF officer), An RAF air chief marshal who held the rank while serving as the Australian Chief of the Air Staff
