= Chief of the Defence Force (Australia) =

Head of the Australian Defence Force

- Incumbent; Mark Hammond since 9 July 2026
- Style: Admiral; General; Air Chief Marshal
- Abbreviation: CDF
- Member of: Australian Defence Force
- Reports to: Minister for Defence
- Term length: Four years
- Formation: 23 March 1958
- First holder: Lieutenant General; Sir Henry Wells
- Deputy: Vice Chief of the Defence Force
- Website: Official website

The chief of the Defence Force (CDF) is the highest-ranking and most senior military officer in the Australian Defence Force (ADF) and is the principal military advisor to the National Security Committee and the minister for defence. The current chief of the Defence Force is Admiral Mark Hammond, who took office on 9 July 2026.

== Responsibilities ==
The CDF commands the ADF under the direction of the Minister for Defence and provides advice on matters that relate to military activity, including military operations. In a diarchy, the CDF serves as co-chairman of the Defence Committee, conjointly with the Secretary of Defence, in the command and control of the Australian Defence Organisation.

The CDF is the Australian equivalent position of what in NATO and the European Union is known as the chief of defence, in the United Kingdom is known as the chief of the Defence Staff, and in the United States is known as the chairman of the Joint Chiefs of Staff, although with the latter prohibited by law from having operational command authority over the US Armed Forces.

Constitutionally, the governor-general of Australia, is the de jure commander-in-chief of the Australian Defence Force. However, in practice, the Australian Government de facto exercises executive power via the Federal Executive Council. The CDF is appointed by the governor-general on the advice of his/her ministers. The appointment is politically neutral, as are all military positions, and not affected by a change of government.

Since 4 July 2014, the CDF is appointed for a fixed four-year term under the Defence Act (1903). Prior to this date, the appointment was for three years. The position of CDF is notionally rotated between the Royal Australian Navy, the Australian Army and the Royal Australian Air Force. However, in practice this has not been the case; of twenty appointees, ten have been from the Army, six from the Navy and four from the Air Force.

During peacetime, the chief of the Defence Force is the only four-star officer in the ADF (admiral, general, or air chief marshal). The CDF is assisted by the vice chief of the Defence Force (VCDF) and serves as the Chairman of the Chiefs of Service Committee, composed of the service chiefs: the chief of Navy (CN), chief of Army (CA), and chief of Air Force (CAF), all of whom are three-star officers (vice admiral, lieutenant general, and air marshal), as is the VCDF.

== History ==
Prior to 1958 there was no CDF or equivalent; a Chiefs of Staff Committee (COSC) existed but no separate position was established as its senior officer. Instead, the senior service chief served as Chairman of the Chiefs of Staff Committee. In March 1958, Lieutenant General Sir Henry Wells was appointed Chairman, Chiefs of Staff Committee, a role independent of and notionally senior to the Army, Navy and Air Force chiefs. However, Wells and his successors did not command the Australian armed forces in any legal sense; the chairman had only an advisory role in the running of the separate services. In February 1976, COSC was dissolved and the new position of Chief of Defence Force Staff (CDFS) was created with command authority over the ADF. In October 1984 the position was renamed Chief of the Defence Force to more clearly reflect the role and its authority.

== Appointments ==
The following list chronologically records those who have held the post of Chief of the Defence Force or its preceding positions. The official title of the position at that period of time is listed immediately before the officers who held the role. The honours are as at the completion of the individual's term.

No.	Portrait	Name	Took office	Left office	Time in office	Defence branch
Chairman, Chiefs of Staff Committee
1	Sir Henry Wells KBE, CB, DSO	Lieutenant General; Sir Henry Wells KBE, CB, DSO (1898–1973)	23 March 1958	22 March 1959	364 days	Army
2	Sir Roy Dowling KBE, CB, DSO	Vice Admiral; Sir Roy Dowling KBE, CB, DSO (1901–1969)	23 March 1959	27 May 1961	2 years, 65 days	Navy
3	Sir Frederick Scherger KBE, CB, DSO, AFC	Air Chief Marshal; Sir Frederick Scherger KBE, CB, DSO, AFC (1904–1984)	28 May 1961	18 May 1966	4 years, 355 days	Air force
4	Sir John Wilton KBE, CB, DSO	General; Sir John Wilton KBE, CB, DSO (1910–1981)	19 May 1966	22 November 1970	4 years, 187 days	Army
5	Sir Victor Smith AC, KBE, CB, DSC	Admiral; Sir Victor Smith AC, KBE, CB, DSC (1913–1998)	23 November 1970	23 November 1975	5 years, 0 days	Navy
6	Frank Hassett AC, CB, CBE, DSO, LVO	General; Frank Hassett AC, CB, CBE, DSO, LVO (1918–2008)	24 November 1975	8 February 1976	76 days	Army
Chief of Defence Force Staff
6	Sir Frank Hassett AC, KBE, CB, DSO, LVO	General; Sir Frank Hassett AC, KBE, CB, DSO, LVO (1918–2008)	9 February 1976	20 April 1977	1 year, 70 days	Army
7	Sir Arthur MacDonald KBE, CB	General; Sir Arthur MacDonald KBE, CB (1919–1995)	21 April 1977	20 April 1979	1 year, 364 days	Army
8	Sir Anthony Synnot KBE, AO	Admiral; Sir Anthony Synnot KBE, AO (1922–2001)	21 April 1979	20 April 1982	2 years, 364 days	Navy
9	Sir Neville McNamara KBE, AO, AFC, AE	Air Chief Marshal; Sir Neville McNamara KBE, AO, AFC, AE (1923–2014)	21 April 1982	12 April 1984	1 year, 357 days	Air force
10	Sir Phillip Bennett AC, KBE, DSO	General; Sir Phillip Bennett AC, KBE, DSO (1928–2023)	13 April 1984	25 October 1984	195 days	Army
Chief of the Defence Force
10	Sir Phillip Bennett AC, KBE, DSO	General; Sir Phillip Bennett AC, KBE, DSO (1928–2023)	26 October 1984	12 April 1987	2 years, 168 days	Army
11	Peter Gration AC, OBE	General; Peter Gration AC, OBE (born 1932)	13 April 1987	16 April 1993	6 years, 3 days	Army
12	Alan Beaumont AC	Admiral; Alan Beaumont AC (1934–2004)	17 April 1993	6 July 1995	2 years, 80 days	Navy
13	John Baker AC, DSM	General; John Baker AC, DSM (1936–2007)	7 July 1995	3 July 1998	2 years, 361 days	Army
14	Chris Barrie AC	Admiral; Chris Barrie AC (born 1945)	4 July 1998	3 July 2002	3 years, 364 days	Navy
15	Peter Cosgrove AC, MC	General; Peter Cosgrove AC, MC (born 1947)	4 July 2002	3 July 2005	2 years, 364 days	Army
16	Angus Houston AC, AFC	Air Chief Marshal; Angus Houston AC, AFC (born 1947)	4 July 2005	3 July 2011	5 years, 364 days	Air force
17	David Hurley AC, DSC	General; David Hurley AC, DSC (born 1953)	4 July 2011	30 June 2014	2 years, 361 days	Army
18	Mark Binskin AC	Air Chief Marshal; Mark Binskin AC (born 1960)	30 June 2014	6 July 2018	4 years, 6 days	Air force
19	Angus Campbell AO, DSC	General; Angus Campbell AO, DSC (born 1963)	6 July 2018	10 July 2024	6 years, 4 days	Army
20	David Johnston AC	Admiral; David Johnston AC (born 1962)	10 July 2024	9 July 2026	1 year, 364 days	Navy
21	Mark Hammond AO	Admiral; Mark Hammond AO (born 1967)	9 July 2026	Incumbent	100 days	Navy
