= Air marshal (Australia) =

Second-highest active rank of the Royal Australian Air Force

- An Australian air marshal's rank insignia

- RAAF AIRMSHL Command Flag
- Country: Australia
- Service branch: Royal Australian Air Force
- Abbreviation: AIRMSHL
- Rank: Three-star
- NATO rank code: OF-8
- Non-NATO rank: O-9
- Formation: 1940
- Next higher rank: Air chief marshal
- Next lower rank: Air vice-marshal
- Equivalent ranks: Vice Admiral (RAN); Lieutenant general (Army)

Air marshal (abbreviated as AIRMSHL) is the second-highest active rank of the Royal Australian Air Force and was created as a direct equivalent of the British Royal Air Force rank of air marshal, it is also considered a three-star rank. The rank is held by the Chief of Air Force (CAF), and when the Vice Chief of the Defence Force (VCDF), the Chief of Joint Operations (CJOPS) and/or the Chief of the Capability Development executive (CCDE) are Air Force officers.

Air marshal is a higher rank than air vice-marshal and is lower than air chief marshal. It is a direct equivalent of vice admiral in the Royal Australian Navy and lieutenant general in the Australian Army.

The insignia is two light blue bands (each on a slightly wider black band) over a light blue band on a black broad band.

The Australian Air Corps adopted the RAF rank system on 9 November 1920 and this usage was continued by its successor, the Royal Australian Air Force. However, the rank of air marshal was not used by the Australian Armed Forces until 1940 when Richard Williams, a RAAF officer, was promoted.

== See also ==
- Air force officer rank insignia
- Australian Defence Force ranks and insignia
- List of Australian air marshals
- Ranks of the RAAF
