= Military star ranking =

Terminology for general and flag officers

Military star ranking is military terminology, used in mainly English speaking countries, to describe general and flag officer/admirals. Within NATO forces, the 1–5 star ranks are equivalent to NATO codes OF-6–10, respectively.

== Star ranking ==
=== One-star ===
A one-star rank is usually the lowest ranking general or flag officer. In many Commonwealth countries, the one-star army rank of Brigadier is considered the highest field officer rank.

=== Two-star ===
A two-star rank is usually the second lowest ranking general or flag officer.

=== Three-star ===
A three-star rank is usually the second or third highest general or flag officer.

=== Four-star ===
A four-star rank is usually the highest or second highest ranking general or flag officer.

=== Five-star ===
A five-star rank is usually the highest ranking general or flag officer. This rank is usually a field marshal, general of the army, admiral of the fleet or marshal of the air force.

=== Proposed six-star ===
In the United States Armed Forces, a six-star rank is a proposed rank immediately superior to a five-star rank, possibly to be worn by the General of the Armies or Admiral of the Navy. This proposal has not been officially recognized by the military or Congress.

== List of countries ==
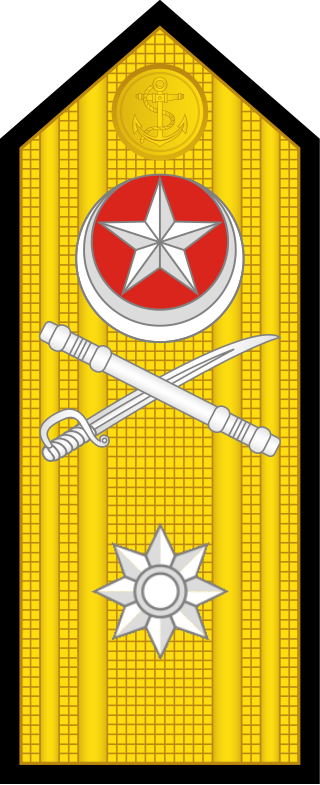
Star rank	Five-star rank	Four-star rank	Three-star rank	Two-star rank	One-star rank	Ref. (Note: Upper references are the Star ranking. Lower references are the insignia.)
Australian Army
Australian Army	Field marshal	General	Lieutenant general	Major general	Brigadier
Royal Australian Navy
Royal Australian Navy	Admiral of the fleet	Admiral	Vice admiral	Rear admiral	Commodore
Royal Australian Air Force
Royal Australian Air Force	Marshal of the RAAF	Air chief marshal	Air marshal	Air vice-marshal	Air commodore
Star rank	Five-star rank	Four-star rank	Three-star rank	Two-star rank	One-star rank	Ref.
Bangladesh Army						–
Bangladesh Army		General জেনারেল	Lieutenant general লেফটেন্যান্ট জেনারেল	Major general মেজর জেনারেল	Brigadier general ব্রিগেডিয়ার জেনারেল	–
Bangladesh Navy
Bangladesh Navy		Admiral অ্যাডমিরাল	Vice admiral ভাইস অ্যাডমিরাল	Rear admiral রিয়ার অ্যাডমিরাল	Commodore কমোডোর
Bangladesh Air Force
Bangladesh Air Force		Air chief marshal এয়ার চিফ মার্শাল	Air marshal এয়ার মার্শাল	Air vice-marshal এয়ার ভাইস মার্শাল	Air commodore এয়ার কমোডর
Star rank	Five-star rank	Four-star rank	Three-star rank	Two-star rank	One-star rank	Ref.
Pakistan Army						–
Pakistan Army	Field marshal فیلڈ مارشل	General جنرل	Lieutenant general لیفٹیننٹ جنرل	Major general میجر جنرل	Brigadier بریگیڈیئر	–
Pakistan Navy						–
Pakistan Navy		Admiral ایڈمرل	Vice admiral وائس ایڈمرل	Rear admiral بحریہ کا امیر	Commodore کموڈور	–
Pakistan Air Force						–
Pakistan Air Force		Air chief marshal امیرسالار فضائیہ	Air marshal سالار فضائیہ	Air vice marshal سالار فضائیہ مقابل	Air commodore عَمِيد الفضاء	–
Star rank	Five-star rank	Four-star rank	Three-star rank	Two-star rank	One-star rank	Ref.
Sri Lanka Army
Sri Lanka Army	Field marshal ෆීල්ඩ් මාර්ෂල්	General ජෙනරාල්	Lieutenant general ලුතිනන් ජෙනරාල්	Major general මේජර් ජෙනරාල්	Brigadier බ්‍රිග‌ේඩියර්
Sri Lanka Navy
Sri Lanka Navy	Admiral of the fleet	Admiral අද්මිරාල්	Vice admiral වයිස් අද්මිරාල්	Rear admiral රියර් අද්මිරාල්	Commodore කොමදෝර්
Sri Lanka Air Force
Sri Lanka Air Force	Marshal of the Air Force	Air chief marshal එයාර් චීෆ් මාර්ෂල්	Air marshal එයාර් මාර්ෂල්	Air vice-marshal එයාර් වයිස් මාර්ෂල්	Air commodore ගුවන් කොමදෝරු
Star rank	Five-star rank	Four-star rank	Three-star rank	Two-star rank	One-star rank	Ref.
British Army						–
British Army	Field marshal	General	Lieutenant-general	Major-general	Brigadier	–
Royal Navy
Royal Navy	Admiral of the Fleet	Admiral	Vice admiral	Rear admiral	Commodore
Royal Air Force
Royal Air Force	Marshal of the RAF	Air chief marshal	Air marshal	Air vice-marshal	Air commodore
Star rank	Five-star rank	Four-star rank	Three-star rank	Two-star rank	One-star rank	Ref.
United States Army
United States Army	General of the Army	General	Lieutenant general	Major general	Brigadier general
United States Navy
United States Navy	Fleet admiral	Admiral	Vice admiral	Rear admiral	Rear admiral (lower half)
United States Air Force
United States Air Force	General of the Air Force	General	Lieutenant general	Major general	Brigadier general
Star rank	Five-star rank	Four-star rank	Three-star rank	Two-star rank	One-star rank	Ref.

== See also ==
- Star (classification)
- Highest military ranks
- Ranks and insignia of NATO
