= John Blaxland (historian) =

Australian historian and academic (born 1963)

Professor John Blaxland SFHEA FRSN FAIIA
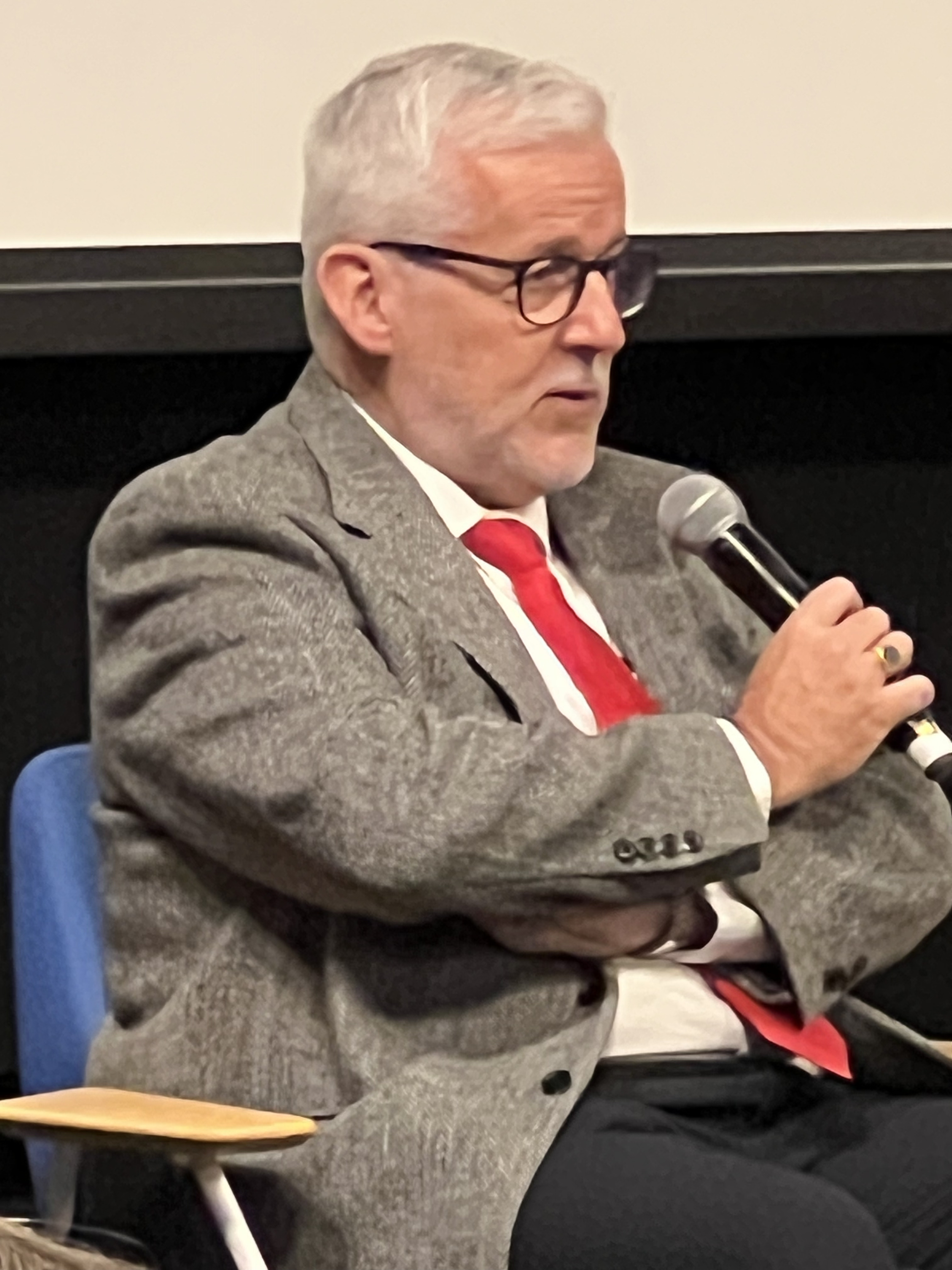
- Blaxland c. 2023
- Born: 1963 (age 62–63); Santiago, Chile
- Occupations: Historian, academic and former Australian Army officer
- Title: Professor of International Security and Intelligence Studies
- Awards: Fellow of the Royal Society of New South Wales; Senior Fellow of the Higher Education Academy; Fellow of the Australian Institute of International Affairs

Academic background
- Education: Barker College; University of New South Wales (BA [Hons]); Australian National University (MA); Royal Military College of Canada (PhD)
- Alma mater: Australian National University

Academic work
- Discipline: History
- Sub-discipline: International Relations; Strategic and Security Studies; Military History; Intelligence; Defence
- Institutions: Australian National University
- Notable works: The Protest Years: The Official History of ASIO, Vol. II, 1963-1975. The Secret Cold War: The Official History of ASIO, Vol. III 1975-1989. Revealing Secrets: An Unofficial History of Australian Signals Intelligence and the Advent of Cyber.
- Website: https://www.johnblaxland.au/

John Charles Blaxland (born 1963) is an Australian historian, academic, and former Australian Army officer. He is a Professor of International Security and Intelligence Studies at the Strategic and Defence Studies Centre at the Australian National University. He is also currently Director of the Australian National University's North America Liaison Office in Washington, D.C.

== Early life and military career ==
Blaxland was born in Chile in 1963 and attended school at Barker College, Sydney. He graduated from the Royal Military College, Duntroon in 1986 and was commissioned as a Lieutenant into the Australian Army's Intelligence Corps. In 1987, he completed his Honours thesis in History at the Australian Defence Force Academy. He completed his regimental training with the Royal Australian Corps of Signals during which he wrote Signals – Swift and Sure: A History of the Royal Australian Army Corps of Signals 1947–1972.

Blaxland graduated from the Royal Thai Army Command and Staff College in 1997. He was a member of the International Force East Timor in 1999. He was posted as an exchange officer at the U.S. Defense Intelligence Agency in Washington D.C. and was awarded a U.S. Meritorious Service Medal for his contribution. He was director of joint intelligence operations at Headquarters Joint Operations Command. He was Australia’s Defence Attaché to Thailand and Myanmar from 2008 to 2010. He retired from the Australian Army in 2011 at the rank of Colonel.

== Education and academic career ==
Blaxland holds a Bachelor of Arts from the University of New South Wales, a Master of Arts in History from the Australian National University, and a Doctor of Philosophy in War Studies from the Royal Military College of Canada.

Blaxland is a Fellow of the Royal Society of New South Wales, Senior Fellow of the Higher Education Academy and a Fellow of the Australian Institute of International Affairs. In 2015 he was the first Australian recipient of a U.S. Department of Defense's Minerva Research Initiative grant.

In 2018 Blaxland won the U.S. Association of Former Intelligence Officers Best Foreign Intelligence Book Award along with Dr. Rhys Crawley for The Secret Cold War: The Official History of ASIO, Vol. III, 1975–1989.

Blaxland was selected in July 2019 to lead an Australian National University team responsible for writing the official history of the Australian Signals Directorate. He stepped down from leading the ANU's Strategic and Defence Studies Centre in order to work on the official history. ASD Director-General Rachel Noble cancelled the ANU's contract in August or September 2020. At this time, Blaxland was reported to have completed half of the first of two planned volumes. Both ASD and the ANU stated that the contract was cancelled by mutual agreement. The Sydney Morning Herald reported that Noble's decision was motivated by a desire to exercise greater control over the official history project.

Blaxland's research interests include Australian military history and strategy, public policy, security, defence, international relations, Southeast Asia (Thailand, Myanmar, East Timor), North America (Canada) and military operations in Afghanistan and Iraq.

Blaxland proposed a new flag design for Australia in 2013.

== Bibliography ==
Blaxland's publications include:

- Conde, Jorge; Blaxland, John (2025). "Challenging the Kremlin's hyperreality construct". Australian Journal of International Affairs. 79 (5): 804–808. doi:10.1080/10357718.2025.2481058. hdl:1885/733796945.
- Blaxland, John, ed. (2025). Mobilising the Australian Army. Cambridge University Press. doi:10.1017/9781009565257. ISBN 978-1-009-56525-7.
- Blaxland, J. (2024). 'Revealing Secrets About Deep Australia-UK-US Intelligence Connections' in Georgetown Journal of International Affairs. Volume 25, Number 1. Georgetown University, Washington D.C.
- Blaxland, J. (2024). Canada's Defence Challenges in the Indo-Pacific: A View from Down Under. Policy Insights Forum, Canada. Volume 2, Number 1.
- Blaxland, J. & Bergin, C., (2023). Revealing Secrets: An Unofficial History of Australian Signals Intelligence and the Advent of Cyber. UNSW Press Ltd. ISBN 978-1-74223-794-7
- Blaxland, John (2023). "Craig stockings' fiery official history of the East Timor crisis". Australian Journal of International Affairs. 77 (3): 333–344. doi:10.1080/10357718.2023.2189219.
- Blaxland, John (2022). "Fear, honour and interests: Cooperation, competition and contestation and Australia's engagement in the Indo-Pacific". Melbourne Asia Review. 9. doi:10.37839/MAR2652-550X9.14.
- Blaxland, John; Bose, Srinjoy; Lushenko, Paul (2021). "The significance—and potential—of a fourth wave of drone warfare scholarship". Drones and Global Order. Routledge. pp. 245–259. doi:10.4324/9781003139676-13. ISBN 978-1-003-13967-6.
- Blaxland, John (2021). "Australia's military after the Second World War: Legacies and challenges". Fighting Australia's Cold War: The Nexus of Strategy and Operations in a Multipolar Asia, 1945–1965. Canberra: ANU Press. pp. 35–52. doi:10.22459/FACW.2021.02. ISBN 978-1-76046-482-0.
- Raymond, G. & Blaxland, J. (2021). The US-Thai Alliance and Asian International Relations: History, Memory and Current Developments. Routledge, New York. ISBN 978-1-032-01006-9
- Blaxland, John; Fielding, Marcus; Gellerfy, Thea, eds. (2020). Niche Wars: Australia in Afghanistan and Iraq, 2001–2014. Canberra: ANU Press. doi:10.22459/NW.2020. ISBN 978-1-76046-402-8.
- Blaxland, John; Kelly, Michael; Brewin Higgins, Liam, eds. (2020). In from the Cold: Reflections on Australia's Korean War. Canberra: ANU Press. doi:10.22459/IFTC.2019. ISBN 978-1-76046-272-7.
- Blaxland, J. (2019). A Geostrategic SWOT Analysis for Australia. Strategic and Defence Studies Centre, Australian National University, Canberra.
- Blaxland, J. & Raymond, G. (2017). Tipping the Balance in Southeast Asia? Thailand, the United States and China. Strategic and Defence Studies Centre, Australian National University, Canberra.
- Blaxland, J. & Crawley, R. (2016). The Secret Cold War: The Official History of ASIO, Vol. III, 1975–1989. Allen & Unwin, Sydney. ISBN 978-1-76029-742-8
- Blaxland, J. (2016). The Protest Years: The Official History of ASIO, Vol. II, 1963-1975. Allen and Unwin, Sydney. ISBN 978-1-76029-418-2
- Blaxland, J. (2016). MANIS: Time for a New Forum to Sweeten Regional Cooperation. Strategic and Defence Studies Centre, Australian National University, Canberra.
- Dean, Peter, ed. (2015). Australia 1944–45. Cambridge University Press. doi:10.1017/CBO9781316015445. ISBN 978-1-107-08346-2.
- Blaxland, J. (2015). 'Return to Turmoil: Timor-Leste 2006', in G. Wahlert, ed., Anzac Cove to Afghanistan: The History of the 3rd Brigade. Big Sky Publishing, Sydney. pp. 289–298. ISBN 9781925275551
- Blaxland, J. ed. (2015). East Timor Intervention: A Retrospective on INTERFET. Melbourne University Publishing Ltd, South Carlton. ISBN 978-0-522-86776-3
- Blaxland, John (2013). The Australian Army from Whitlam to Howard. Cambridge University Press. doi:10.1017/CBO9781107445246. ISBN 978-1-107-04365-7.
- Blaxland, J. (2006). Revisiting Counterinsurgency: A Manoeuvrist Response to the 'War on Terror' for the Australian Army. Land Warfare Studies Centre, Canberra.
- Blaxland, J. (2006). Strategic Cousins: Australian and Canadian Expeditionary Forces and the British and American Empires. McGill-Queen's University Press, Canada. ISBN 978-0-7735-3064-5
- Blaxland, J. (2002). Information-Era Manoeuvre: The Australian-led Mission to East Timor. Land Warfare Studies Centre, Canberra. ISBN 978-0-642-29566-8
- Blaxland, J. (1998). Signals – Swift and Sure: A History of the Royal Australian Army Corps of Signals 1947–1972. Royal Australian Corps of Signals Corps Committee, Canberra. ISBN 978-0-646-36551-0
- Blaxland, J. (1989). Organising an Army: The Australian Experience 1957-1965. Strategic and Defence Studies Centre, Australian National University, Canberra. ISBN 978-0-7315-0530-2
