= Parliamentary Joint Committee on Intelligence and Security =

The Parliamentary Joint Committee on Intelligence and Security (PJCIS) is a joint committee of the Parliament of Australia which oversees Australia's primary agencies of the Australian Intelligence Community: Australian Security Intelligence Organisation (ASIO), the Australian Secret Intelligence Service (ASIS), the Australian Signals Directorate (ASD), the Defence Intelligence Organisation (DIO), the Australian Geospatial-Intelligence Organisation (DIGO), and the Office of National Assessments (ONA).

The committee, then called the Parliamentary Joint Committee on ASIO, ASIS and DSD, was established pursuant to the Intelligence Services Act 2001 and was first appointed in March 2002.

== History ==
The Parliamentary Joint Committee on ASIO, ASIS and DSD (PJCAAD) was established pursuant to the Intelligence Services Act 2001 and replaced the Parliamentary Joint Committee on ASIO (which was established in 1988) and the Joint Select Committee on the Intelligence Services. The PJCIS's purview was expanded from 1 July 2004 to include DIO, DIGO and ONA, following the recommendations from the flood inquiry. On 2 December 2005, the name of the committee was changed to the Parliamentary Joint Committee on Intelligence and Security (PJCIS).

The members of the first committee were appointed in March 2002.

== Functions ==
The PJCIS's main function is administrative and expenditure review and oversight of ASIO, ASIS and DSD. The committee can also review matters relating to the three agencies referred to them by Parliamentary Resolution, or by a request from the Minister responsible for the agency in question. The committee does not review intelligence gathering or operational procedures or priorities, nor does it conduct inquiries into individual complaints about the activities of ASIO, ASIS or DSD.

== Reforms ==
Several major security reforms have been introduced to Commonwealth law, as a result of PJCIS reviews. They include the following:

=== Assistance and Access Act ===
The committee carried the Telecommunications and Other Legislation Amendment (Assistance and Access) Act 2018 through to legislation enabling security agencies to access otherwise encrypted communications by people who intend harm to Australians. Members of the committee expressed satisfaction on the bill becoming law, as it would enable security agencies to "surgically strike terrorists, spies, drug traffickers and paedophiles."

=== Security of Critical Infrastructure Act ===
Prompted by the sale of the Port Darwin to interests connected to the Chinese Communist Party, the committee made recommendations for the Security of Critical Infrastructure Act 2018 (Cth) (Act)— placing a national security test to any foreign investment into energy or water assets and, notably, ports.

=== Espionage and Foreign Interference Act ===
In early 2018, the joint committee heard submissions from the intelligence services that indicated Australia was facing an unprecedented threat from espionage and foreign interference. The committee made "60 bipartisan recommendations on the government's separate espionage and foreign interference laws, which include greater protections for journalists."

=== Foreign Influence Transparency Scheme ===
The committee also contributed amendments to the Foreign Influence Transparency Scheme Act 2018. At this time, ZTE and Huawei and other "high-risk vendors" were deemed as unsuitable technology partners for the rollout of Australia's 5G network. Overshadowed by the leadership controversy, these security decisions went largely unreported. However, security partners, such as Congressman Mike Gallagher would later see that Australia was both the first Western democracy to be targeted by China and the first to protect itself:

Australia was not only the canary in the coal mine for the expansion of Chinese influence, and just the way that they ruthlessly waged economic and ideological warfare; but was also the leader of the free world, the first country to take massive steps to counter that.

== Membership ==
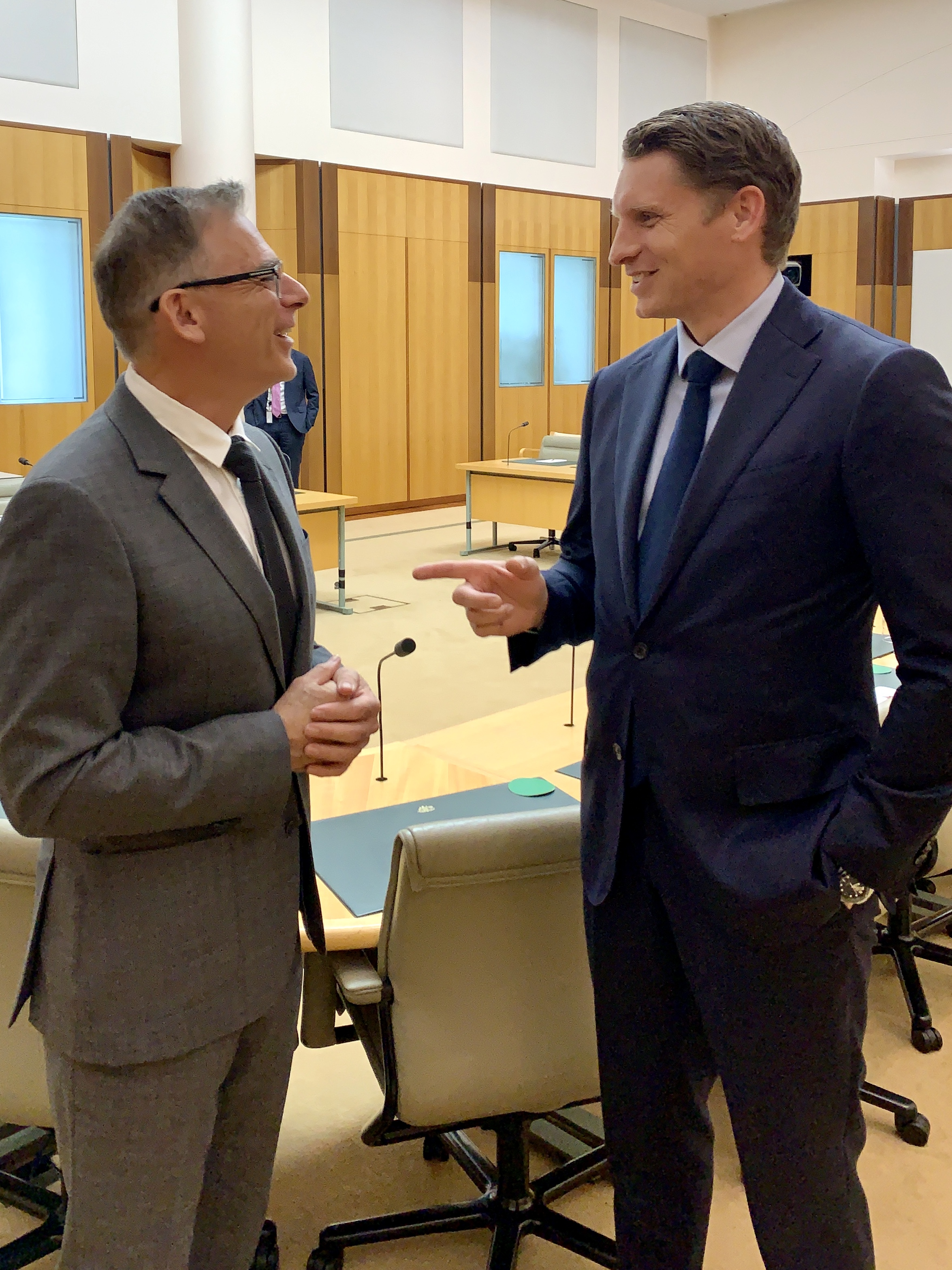
Anthony Byrne, a Labor MP and former Deputy Chair of the Parliamentary Joint Committee on Intelligence and Security with former Chair, Andrew Hastie MP.

The committee consists of eleven members: five from the Senate and six from the House of Representatives. Six members are from the Government and five from the Opposition. Serving ministers are not allowed to be members, but members may previously have held ministerial positions. Members of the committee cease to be members when Parliament is dissolved, and new members are appointed after the new Parliament convenes.

The members of the committee as of 15 July 2026 were:

- Senator Raff Ciccone (chair) (ALP, VIC)
- Mr Andrew Wallace MP (deputy chair) (LNP, Member for Fisher, QLD)
- Senator the Hon Michaelia Cash (Lib, WA)
- Ms Sharon Claydon MP (ALP, Member for Newcastle, NSW)
- Senator the Hon Jonathon Duniam (Lib, TAS)
- Senator Karen Grogan (ALP, SA)
- Ms Tania Lawrence MP (ALP, Member for Hasluck, WA)
- Mr Jerome Laxale MP (ALP, Member for Bennelong, NSW)
- Senator Susan McDonald (LNP, QLD)
- Dr Gordon Reid MP (ALP, Member for Robertson, NSW)
- Senator Marielle Smith (ALP, SA)
- Mr Phillip Thompson OAM MP (LNP, Member for Herbert, QLD)

== See also ==
=== Intelligence agencies ===
- Australian Security Intelligence Organisation
- Australian Secret Intelligence Service
- Defence Signals Directorate
- Defence Intelligence Organisation
- Defence Imagery and Geospatial Organisation
- Office of National Assessments

=== Legislation ===
- Intelligence Services Act 2001
- Intelligence Services Amendment Act 2004
