= Australian Security Intelligence Organisation =

Australian domestic intelligence agency

Coordinates: 35°17′33.6″S 149°8′40.1″E

Agency overview
- Formed: 16 March 1949; 77 years ago
- Jurisdiction: Australian Government
- Headquarters: Ben Chifley Building, Parkes, Australian Capital Territory
- Employees: ~2000 (Note: The current headcount of ASIO is not publicly available content and has been redacted from the publicly-released 2023–24 annual report. At the end of 2018, there was 1,980 employees and at least 200 additional employees were on-boarded during the 2023–24 financial year.)
- Annual budget: A$594.3 million (2024–25)
- Minister responsible: Minister for Home Affairs
- Agency executive: Mike Burgess, Director-General
- Parent department: Department of Home Affairs
- Website: asio.gov.au

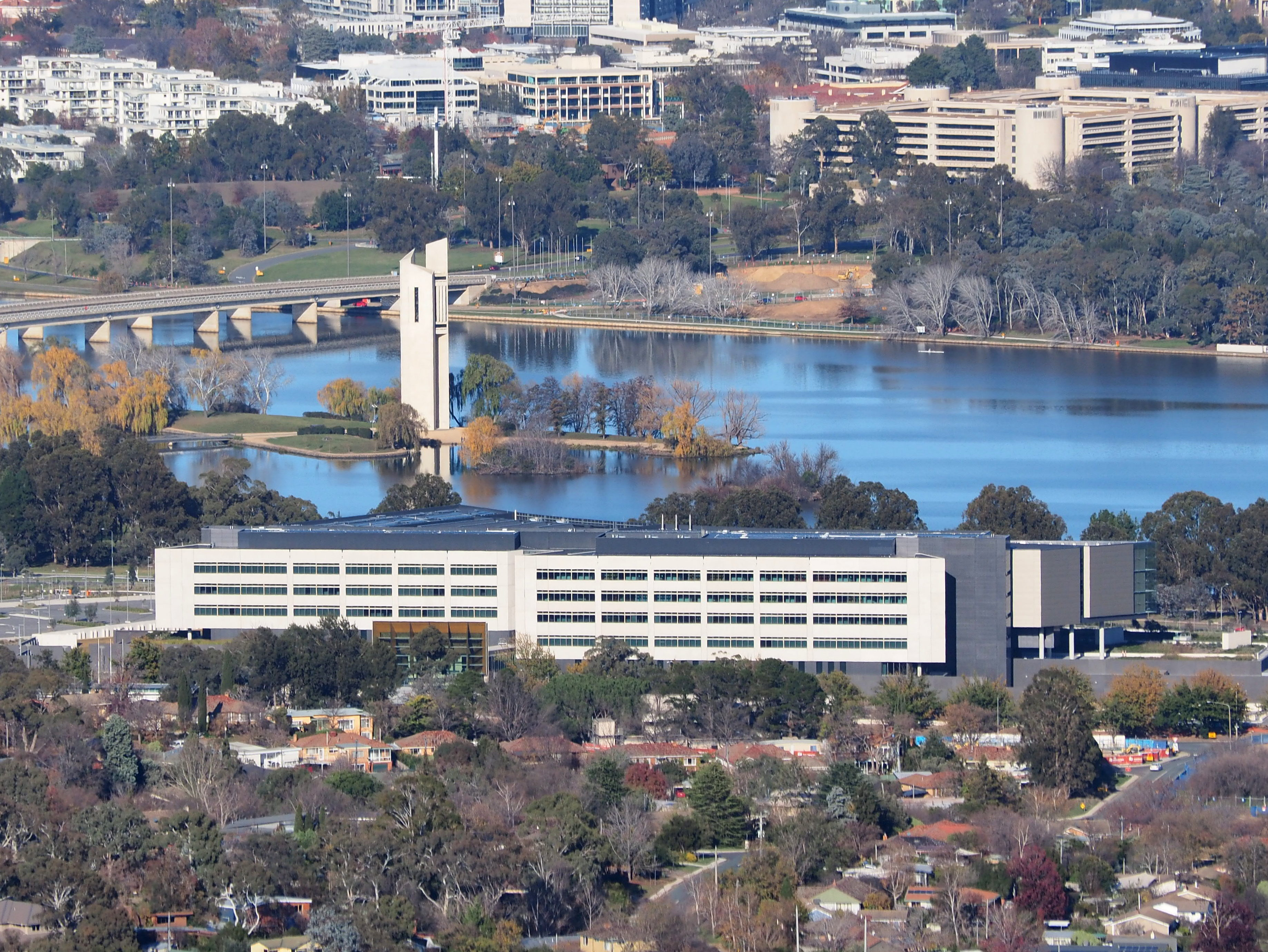
ASIO's Central Office building in the Parliamentary Triangle, Canberra

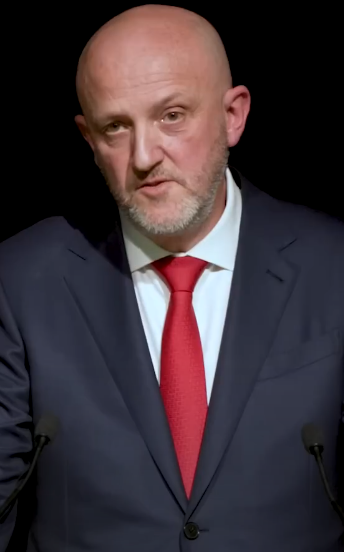
Director-general of ASIO Mike Burgess

The Australian Security Intelligence Organisation (ASIO /ˈeɪzioʊ/) is the national security and intelligence agency of the Australian Government, responsible for protecting Australia and its citizens from espionage, sabotage, foreign interference, politically motivated violence, terrorism, and attacks on the national defence system. ASIO is a primary entity of the Australian Intelligence Community, and is comparable to that of the United States' FBI or the British MI5. As of 2026 the director-general of ASIO is Mike Burgess.

ASIO has a wide range of surveillance powers to collect human and signals intelligence. Generally, ASIO operations requiring police powers of arrest and detention under warrant are co-ordinated with the Australian Federal Police (AFP) and/or with state and territory police forces.

== Governance and structure ==
=== Background ===
ASIO was stablished in 1949 by Prime Minister Ben Chifley's Directive for the Establishment and Maintenance of a Security Service under the executive power of the Constitution, under the control of the Director-General of Security and responsible to the Attorney-General. The Australian Security Intelligence Organisation Act 1956 established ASIO as a statutory body.

=== Current governance ===
Australian Security Intelligence Organisation Act 1979

Parliament of Australia
- Long title: An Act relating to the Australian Security Intelligence Organisation
- Royal assent: 25 October 1979

Related legislation
- Intelligence Services Act 2001
- Status: Current legislation

The Australian Security Intelligence Organisation Act 1979 (the "ASIO Act") is an Act of the Parliament of Australia which replaced the Australian Security Intelligence Organisation Act 1956. The ASIO Act established and regulates ASIO in its current form. ASIO is responsible to the federal parliament through the Minister for Home Affairs. ASIO also reports to the Parliamentary Joint Committee on Intelligence and Security and the Senate's Legal and Constitutional Affairs Committee, and is also subject to independent review by the Inspector-General of Intelligence and Security. The head of ASIO is the Director-General of Security, who oversees the strategic management of ASIO within guidelines issued by the Attorney-General.

As of 2026 the director-general of security is Mike Burgess, who assumed office on 16 September 2019.

=== Officers of the organisation ===
Officers of ASIO are employed under the ASIO Act, and are classed as "Officers of the Commonwealth" for the purposes of the Crimes Act 1914, which among other provisions makes impersonating an ASIO officer a criminal offence. The ASIO Act also makes the identification of ASIO officers a criminal offence punishable by one year imprisonment.

In 2018, ASIO had an average of 1,980 staff. Changes since to security measures have meant that the specific headcount is classified and not publicly available. The identity of ASIO officers other than the director-general and deputy director-generals remains an official secret.

After passage of the National Security Legislation Amendment Act 2014 by the Australian Parliament, ASIO officers are exempt from prosecution for a wide range of illegal activities in the course of conducting operations. ASIO officers may carry arms, and the Minister responsible has the ability under certain conditions to approve the provision of any weapon or training to any specified person, even outside of ASIO officers.

== Description and functions ==
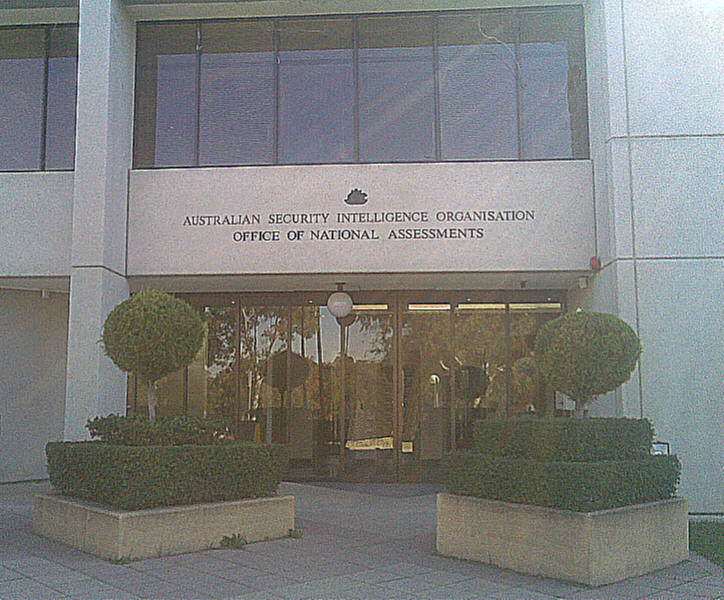
The ASIO's old Central Office

ASIO is the Australian Government's national security and intelligence agency, and therefore a primary entity of the Australian Intelligence Community. It is responsible for protecting Australia and its citizens from espionage, sabotage, foreign interference, politically motivated violence, terrorism, and attacks on the national defence system.

ASIO Central Office is in Canberra, with a local office being located in each mainland state and territory capital. A new central office building named the Ben Chifley Building, after Ben Chifley, the prime minister who created the organisation, was officially opened by then-prime minister Kevin Rudd on 23 July 2013.

== Powers and accountability ==
ASIO has a wide range of surveillance powers to collect human and signals intelligence. The organisation is comparable to that of the United States' FBI or the British MI5.

Generally, ASIO operations requiring police powers of arrest and detention under warrant are co-ordinated with the Australian Federal Police (AFP) and/or with state and territory police forces.

=== Special investigative powers ===
The special investigative powers available to ASIO officers under warrant signed by the attorney-general include:

- Interception of telecommunications,
- Examination of postal and delivery articles,
- Use of clandestine surveillance and tracking devices,
- Remote access to computers, including alteration of data to conceal that access,
- Covert entry to and search of premises, including the removal or copying of any record or thing found therein, and
- Conduct of an ordinary or frisk search of a person if they are at or near a premises specified in the warrant.

The director-general also has the power to independently issue a warrant should a serious security situation arise and a warrant requested of the attorney-general has not yet been granted.

An ASIO officer may, without warrant, ask an operator of an aircraft or vessel questions about the aircraft or vessel, its cargo, crew, passengers, stores or voyage; and to produce supporting documents relating to these questions.

=== Special terrorism investigative powers ===
When investigating terrorism, the director-general may seek a warrant from an independent judicial authority to allow:

- The compulsory questioning of suspects,
- The detention of suspects by the AFP, and their subsequent interrogation by ASIO officers,
- Ordinary, frisk or strip search of suspects by AFP officers upon their detainment,
- The seizure of passports, and
- The prevention of suspects leaving Australia.

=== Immunity from prosecution ===
The Act does not specifically state the types of crimes that ASIO officers receive immunity from, rather stating the exceptions in which an officer would not be indemnified by the Commonwealth. Section 35k (1) defines these activities as not being immune from liability for special intelligence conduct during special intelligence operations. An ASIO officer would be deemed to have committed a crime if they were to participate in any of the following activities under any circumstances:

- An activity that causes death or serious injury,
- Torture,
- If the activity involves the commission of a sexual offence against any person, or
- If the activity causes significant loss of, or serious damage to property.

=== Collection of foreign intelligence ===
ASIO's authority relates exclusively to domestic intelligence and intervention, however ASIO may take part in domestic intelligence gathering relating to a foreign threat alongside the Australian Secret Intelligence Service, Australian Signals Directorate and Australian Geospatial-Intelligence Organisation. ASIO has the power to collect foreign intelligence within Australia on the issuance of a warrant by the Attorney-General.

=== Accountability ===
Because of the nature of its work, ASIO does not make details of its activities public and law prevents the identities of ASIO officers from being disclosed. ASIO and the Australian Government say that operational measures ensuring the legality of ASIO operations have been established.

ASIO briefs the attorney-general on all major issues affecting security and they are also informed of operations when considering granting warrants enabling the special investigative powers of ASIO. Furthermore, the attorney-general issues guidelines with respect to the conduct of ASIO investigations relating to politically motivated violence and its functions of obtaining intelligence relevant to security.

ASIO reports to several governmental and parliamentary committees dealing with security, legislative and financial matters. This includes the Parliamentary Joint Committee on Intelligence and Security and the Senate's Legal and Constitutional Affairs Committee. A classified annual report is provided to the government, an unclassified edited version of which is tabled in federal parliament.

The Office of the Inspector-General of Intelligence and Security was established in 1986 to provide additional oversight of Australia's security and intelligence agencies. The inspector-general has complete access to all ASIO records and has a range of inquisitorial powers.

== Relationships with other agencies and services ==
=== Domestic ===
ASIO works in close collaboration with the Australian Secret Intelligence Service (ASIS), Australian Signals Directorate (ASD), Office of National Assessments (ONA), Defence Intelligence Organisation (DIO), Australian Geospatial-Intelligence Organisation (AGO), as well as the AFP and police forces of the states and territories.

In November 2026, a new unit called the Counter Terrorism Online Centre (CTOC) opened in Sydney. Run jointly by the AFP and ASIO, its aim is to identify at-risk youth online, and to prevent radicalisation and grooming that leads to acts of terrorism. The centre will employs both human investigators and AI tools to improve threat detection. Using specialist intelligence analystss, counter-terrorism investigators, and covert capabilities from both agencies, ASIO and the AFP are more easily able to share intelligence and coordinate their responses to possible threats.

=== Foreign ===
Australia's intelligence and security agencies maintain close working relationships with the foreign and domestic intelligence and security agencies of other nations. As of 22 October 2008, ASIO had established liaison relationships with 311 authorities in 120 countries.

== History ==
=== Pre-ASIO ===
The Australian Government assumed responsibility for national security and intelligence on federation in 1901, and took over various state agencies and had to rationalise their functions. There was considerable overlap between the civil and military authorities. Similarly, there was also no Commonwealth agency responsible for enforcing federal laws. At the outbreak of World War I, no Australian government agency was dedicated to security, intelligence or law enforcement. The organisation of security intelligence in Australia took on more urgency with a perceived threat posed by agents provocateurs, fifth columnists and saboteurs within Australia.

In 1915, the British government arranged for the establishment of a Commonwealth branch of the Imperial Counter Espionage Bureau in Australia. The branch came to be known as the Australian Special Intelligence Bureau (SIB) in January 1916, and maintained a close relationship with state police forces, and later with the Commonwealth Police Force, created in 1917, to conduct investigations independent of state police forces. After the war, on 1 November 1919, the SIB and Commonwealth Police were merged to form the Investigation Branch within the Attorney General's Department.

Provoked by World War II, the Commonwealth Security Service was formed in 1941 to investigate organisations and individuals considered likely to be subversive or actively opposed to national interests; to investigate espionage and sabotage; to vet defence force personnel and workers in defence-related industries; to control the issue of passports and visas; and was responsible for the security of airports and wharves, and factories engaged in manufacture of munitions and other items necessary for Australia's war effort. It was also responsible for radio security. In June 1945 it produced a report warning of the danger of the Communist Party of Australia.

Robert Frederick Bird Wake, one of the foundation directors of ASIO, is credited the creation of the Australian intelligence community in 1949, as claimed by Valdemar Wake, in his biography No Ribbons or Medals of his father's work as a counter espionage officer. Wake worked closely with Director-General Reed. During World War II, Reed conducted an inquiry into Wake's performance as a security officer and found that he was competent and innocent of the charges laid by the Army's commander-in-chief, General Thomas Blamey. This was the start of a relationship between Reed and Wake that lasted for more than 10 years. Wake was seen as the operational head of ASIO.

=== Establishment and 'The Case' ===
Following the end of World War II, the joint United States-UK Venona project uncovered sensitive British and Australian government data being transmitted through Soviet diplomatic channels. Officers from MI5 were dispatched to Australia to assist local investigations. The leak was eventually tracked to a spy ring operating from the Soviet Embassy in Canberra. Allied Western governments expressed disaffection with the state of security in Australia.

On 9 March 1949, Prime Minister Ben Chifley created the post of Director-General of Security and appointed South Australian Supreme Court Justice Geoffrey Reed to the post. On 16 March 1949, Chifley issued a Directive for the Establishment and Maintenance of a Security Service. The Security Service's first authorised telephone interceptions were in June 1949, followed in July by a raid on the Sydney office of the Communist Party of Australia. In August 1949, Reed advised the Prime Minister that he had decided to name the service the 'Australian Security Intelligence Organization' [sic].

The new service was to be modelled on the Security Service of the United Kingdom MI5 and an MI5 liaison team (including Sir Roger Hollis) was attached to the fledgling ASIO during the early 1950s. Historian Robert Manne describes this early relationship as "special, almost filial" and continues "ASIO's trust in the British counter-intelligence service appears to have been near-perfect".

The Labor Government was defeated at the December 1949 federal election, and in March 1950 the new prime minister, Robert Menzies, appointed the Deputy Director of Military Intelligence, Charles Spry, as the second Director-General of Security, commencing on 9 July 1950. Wake resigned shortly after Spry's appointment. On 6 July 1950, a Directive of Prime Minister Menzies set out the Charter of the Australian Security Intelligence Organization, which expanded on Chifley's 1949 Directive. ASIO was converted to a statutory body on 13 December 1956 by the Australian Security Intelligence Organisation Act 1956 (later repealed by the Australian Security Intelligence Organisation Act 1979, the current legislation as amended to 2007). Spry would continue to hold the post until January 1970. The spelling of the organisation was amended by legislation in 1999 to bring it into line with the Australian standard form 'organisation'.

The operation to crack the Soviet spy ring in Canberra consumed much of the resources of ASIO during the 1950s. This operation became internally known as "The Case". Among the prime suspects of the investigations were Wally Clayton, a prominent member of the Australian Communist Party, and two diplomats with the Department of External Affairs, Jim Hill and Ian Milner. However, no charges resulted from the investigations, because Australia did not have any laws against peacetime espionage at the time.

=== The Petrov Affair ===
5 February 1951 saw the arrival in Sydney of Vladimir Mikhaylovich Petrov, Third Secretary of the Soviet Embassy. An ASIO field officer identified Petrov as a possible 'legal', an agent of the Soviet Ministry of State Security (MGB, a forerunner to the KGB) operating under diplomatic immunity. The Organisation began gently cultivating Petrov through another agent, Dr. Michael Bialoguski, with the eventual goal of orchestrating his defection. Ultimately, Petrov was accused by the Soviet Ambassador of several lapses in judgement that would have led to his imprisonment and probable execution upon his return to the Soviet Union. Petrov feared for his life and accepted the defection life-line provided by ASIO.

The actual defection occurred on 3 April 1954. Petrov was spirited to a safe house by ASIO officers, but his disappearance and the seeming reluctance of Australian authorities to search for him made the Soviets increasingly suspicious. Fearing a defection by Petrov, MVD officers dramatically escorted his wife Evdokia to a waiting aeroplane in Sydney. There was doubt as to whether she was leaving by choice or through coercion and so Australian authorities initially did not act to prevent her being bundled into the plane. However, ASIO was in communication with the pilot and learned through relayed conversations with a flight attendant that if Evdokia spoke to her husband she might consider seeking asylum in Australia.

An opportunity to allow her to speak with her husband came when the Director-General of Security, Charles Spry, was informed that the MVD agents had broken Australian law by carrying firearms on an airliner in Australian airspace and so could be detained. When the aeroplane landed in Darwin for refuelling, the Soviet party and other passengers were asked to leave the plane. Police, acting on ASIO orders, quickly disarmed and restrained the two MVD officers and Evdokia was taken into the terminal to speak to her husband via telephone. After speaking to him, she became convinced he was alive and speaking freely and asked the Administrator of the Northern Territory for political asylum.

The affair sparked controversy in Australia when circumstantial links were noted between the leader of the Australian Labor Party and the Communist Party of Australia (and hence to the Soviet spy ring). H.V. Evatt, the leader of the Labor Party at the time, accused Prime Minister Robert Menzies of arranging the Petrov defection to discredit him. The accusations lead to a disastrous split in the Labor party.

Petrov was able to provide information on the structure of the Soviet intelligence apparatus in the mid-1950s, information that was highly valuable to the United States. It was by obtaining this information that the Organisation's reputation in the eyes of the United States was greatly enhanced.

In fact, when Brigadier Spry retired, the Deputy Director of the CIA sent the following tribute:

The relationship between the CIA and ASIO started as a very personal one. The real substantive relationship started with Sir Charles' visit in 1955... Since Sir Charles' first visit, the relationships with ASIO have continued to become closer and closer until today we have no secrets, regardless of classification or sensitivity, that are not made available to ASIO if it is pertinent to Australia's internal security... I feel, as does the Director, a type of mutual trust in dealing with ASIO that is exceeded by no other service in the world today.

=== The Cold War ===
ASIO's counter-intelligence successes continued throughout the Cold War. Following an elaborate investigation between 1961 and 1963, ASIO recommended the ejection of the First Secretary of the Soviet Embassy, Ivan Skripov, and his declaration as persona non grata. Skripov had been refining Kay Marshall, an English-Australian woman as an agent for Soviet intelligence; however, she was in fact an agent of ASIO.

In April 1983, ASIO uncovered more Soviet attempts at espionage and Valery Ivanov, who also held the post of First Secretary at the Soviet Embassy, was declared persona non grata. He was ejected from Australia on the grounds that he had performed duties in violation of his diplomatic status.

=== Penetration by the KGB ===
These successes were marred, however, by the penetration of ASIO by a KGB mole in the 1970s. Due to the close defence and intelligence ties between Australia and the United States, ASIO became a backdoor to American intelligence. Upon realising ASIO was compromised, the United States pulled back on the information it shared with Australia.

Following a strenuous internal audit and a joint Federal Police investigation, George Sadil was accused of being the mole. Sadil had been a Russian interpreter with ASIO for some 25 years and highly classified documents were discovered in his place of residence. Federal Police arrested Sadil in June 1993 and charged him under the Crimes Act 1914 with several espionage and official secrets related offences. However, parts of the case against him collapsed the following year.

Sadil was committed to trial in March 1994, but the Director of Public Prosecutions decided not to proceed with the more serious espionage-related charges after reviewing the evidence against him. Sadil's profile did not match that of the mole and investigators were unable to establish any kind of money trail between him and the KGB.

Sadil pleaded guilty in December 1994 to thirteen charges of removing ASIO documents contrary to his duty, and was sentenced to three months imprisonment. He was subsequently released on a 12-month good behaviour bond. It is believed that another ASIO officer, now retired, is suspected of being the mole but no prosecution attempts have been made.

In November 2004, former KGB Major-General Oleg Kalugin confirmed to the Australian Broadcasting Corporation's Four Corners programme that the KGB had in fact infiltrated ASIO in the late 1970s and early 1980s.

ASIO acknowledged in October 2016 that it had been infiltrated.

In 2023, the mole was identified as Ian George Peacock. Peacock's code name within the KGB was "Mira".

=== Sydney 2000 Olympic Games ===
ASIO began planning for the 2000 Olympic and Paralympic Games, held in Sydney, as early as 1995. A specific Olympics Coordination Branch was created in 1997, and began recruiting staff with "specialised skills" the following year. In 1998, ASIO "strengthened information collection and analytical systems, monitored changes in the security environment more broadly, improved its communications technology and provided other agencies with strategic security intelligence assessments to assist their Olympics security planning".

The Olympics Coordination Branch also began planning for the Federal Olympic Security Intelligence Centre (FOSIC) in 1998. FOSIC was to "provide security intelligence advice and threat assessments to State and Commonwealth authorities during the Sydney 2000 Games".

=== Surveillance of anti-coal activists ===
In 2012 it was reported that ASIO had been monitoring the actions of Australians protesting against the coal industry, and was increasing its efforts from previous years. Minister Martin Ferguson said that he was particularly concerned about protests relating to the Hazelwood power station in Victoria. An unnamed security source told The Age newspaper that "providing advice and intelligence to safeguard [critical infrastructure] is clearly within ASIO's responsibilities... ASIO has a clear role, including protection against sabotage. And it's clear [environmental] activists pose a greater threat to energy facilities than terrorists." A spokesperson for Attorney General Nicola Roxon described ASIO's responsibility in monitoring political action groups as "limited to activity that is, or has the potential to be, violent for the purposes of achieving a political objective". Australian Greens party leader Bob Brown described ASIO monitoring environmentalists as a "political weapon" used by the Government for the benefit of "foreign-owned mining corporations".

=== Chinese intelligence activity ===
Nicola Roxon, the Attorney-General of Australia, blocked Chinese, state-owned company Huawei from seeking a supply contract for the National Broadband Network, on the advice of the ASIO. The Australian government feared Huawei would provide backdoor access for Chinese cyber espionage.

In May 2013, ABC News claimed that China stole blueprints to the headquarters of the ASIO.

Sheri Yan and Roger Uren were investigated by ASIO on suspicion of spying for China. Uren, former Assistant Secretary responsible for the Asia section of the Office of National Assessments, was found to have removed documents pertaining to Chinese intelligence operations in Australia, and kept them in his apartment. Yan was suspected of undertaking influence operations on behalf of the Chinese Communist Party, and introducing Colonel Liu Chaoying, a military intelligence officer, to Australian contacts.

=== Expansion of powers, 2020 ===
In 2020, Peter Dutton, then Minister for Home Affairs, introduced the Australian Security Intelligence Organisation Amendment Bill 2020, which expanded ASIO's questioning powers to cover espionage, foreign interference, and political violence, while the age which ASIO can compulsively question minors has been reduced to 14 from 16. Furthermore, ASIO can authorize the usage of tracking devices without warrants. The Law Council of Australia criticized the bill and compared it to the 2020 Hong Kong national security law, due to its expansion of questioning powers to cover political violence, which the LCA argued could be used against acts of lawful protest, a claim that ASIO head Mike Burgess rejected.

In March 2021, ASIO's director-general Mike Burgess told The Guardian Australia that the agency had removed a "nest of spies" from an unidentified country in 2020. Burgess also acknowledged that ASIO's counter-terrorism case load relating to right-wing extremism had increased from 30% to 40% since the Christchurch mosque shootings in New Zealand. During a 2021 speech, Burgess also confirmed that ASIO would use new terminology including "ideologically motivated violent extremism" to refer to right-wing extremism and "religiously motivated violent extremism" to refer to Islamic extremism.

In early May 2024, The Washington Post reported that ASIO had expelled two officers from India's foreign intelligence service, the Research and Analysis Wing in 2020, alleging they were part of a "nest of spies" who had sought to cultivate politicians, monitor diaspora communities and obtain classified information. The Post reported that the 2020 incident was part of a series of clashes between RAW and other Western domestic security services in Germany and the United Kingdom.

In early November 2025, Burgess stated that three unidentified countries were capable of assassinating perceived political dissidents in Australia. He also confirmed that ASIO had disrupted a foreign intelligence gathering operation involving an Australian citizen, who had been instructed to gather information about Australia's economy, critical minerals and the AUKUS defence pact.

=== Iranian state-sponsored terrorism ===
In late August 2025, an ASIO investigation found that Islamic Revolutionary Guard Corps (IGRC) was implicated in an arson attack on a Jewish restaurant in Sydney in October 2024 and a Melbourne synagogue in December 2024. In response, the Australian Prime Minister Anthony Albanese declared the Iranian Ambassador Ahmad Sadeghi and three other Iranian officials persona non grata and withdrew Australian diplomats from Tehran. The Australian Government also confirmed it would designate the IRGC as a terrorist organisation.

== Royal commissions, inquiries and reviews ==
=== Royal Commission on Intelligence and Security, 1974–77 ===
On 21 August 1974, Prime Minister Gough Whitlam announced the establishment of the Royal Commission on Intelligence and Security to inquire into Australia's intelligence agencies. Justice Robert Hope of the Supreme Court of New South Wales was appointed as Royal Commissioner. In 1977 the First Hope Commission made many findings about, and recommendations on, ASIO in the Fourth Report, some of which had been preempted by the Whitlam and Fraser governments. The commission marked the first review of the organisation and was fundamental to securing it as part of Australia's state defensive apparatus. In a secret supplementary report, much of which remains classified, Hope indicated his belief that ASIO's past conduct was the result of its infiltration by a hostile foreign intelligence agency. In a 1998 interview Hope stated that saw some of his major recommendations as having been wrong.

The Commission found that ASIO provided the CIA with information about prominent Australian politicians and government officials. The information included accusations of subversive activities and details of private lives.

=== Protective Security Review, 1978–79 ===
Following the Sydney Hilton bombing in 1978, the government commissioned Justice Hope with conducting a review into national protective security arrangements and into co-operation between Federal and State authorities in regards to security. In the report concluded in 1979, Justice Hope designated ASIO as the agency responsible for national threat assessments in terrorism and politically motivated violence. He also recommended that relations between ASIO and State and Territory police forces be regulated by arrangements between governments.

=== Royal Commission on Australian Security and Intelligence Agencies, 1983–84 ===
Following the publicity surrounding the expulsion of Valery Ivanov, First Secretary at the Soviet Embassy in Canberra, the Government established a Royal Commission to review the activities of Australian security and intelligence agencies. Justice Hope was again Royal Commissioner.

Justice Hope completed his report in December 1984. His recommendations included that:

- The security related activities which ASIO should investigate be redefined. References to subversion and terrorism be removed and replaced with politically motivated violence, attacks on Australia's defence system and promoting communal violence;
- ASIO be given additional functions of collecting foreign intelligence and providing protective security advice; and that
- A separate office of Inspector-General of Intelligence and Security be established.

Justice Hope also recommended that amendments to the ASIO Act provide that "it is not the purpose of the Act that the right of lawful advocacy, protest or dissent should be affected or that exercising those rights should, by themselves, constitute activity prejudicial to security".

=== Post-Cold War review, 1992 ===
In early 1992, Prime Minister Paul Keating commissioned a review "of the overall impact of changes in international circumstances on the roles and priorities of the Australian intelligence agencies". In his statement of 21 July 1992, Keating said:

Consistent with the philosophy of a separation of the assessment, policy and foreign intelligence collection functions, the Government considers that the existing roles of the individual agencies remain valid in the 1990s. The rationale outlined by Mr Justice Hope for ASIO as a freestanding, non-executive, advisory intelligence security agency remains relevant in the 1990s and the Government has therefore decided that ASIO should continue to have the roles and responsibilities laid down in existing legislation.

The Soviet threat certainly formed an important component of ASIO's activities, but threats from other sources of foreign interference and politically motivated violence have been important to ASIO for some time, and will remain so. However, the implications for ASIO of the changes in the former Soviet Union and Eastern Europe are more far-reaching than for the other agencies. The Government has therefore decided that while ASIO's capacity to meet its responsibilities must be maintained, there is scope for resource reductions.

The resource reductions mentioned were a cut of 60 staff and a $3.81 million budget decrease.

=== Inquiry into National Security, 1993 ===
Following the trial of George Sadil over the ASIO mole scandal and from concern about the implications of material having been removed from ASIO without authority, the Prime Minister announced the appointment of Mr Michael Cook AO (former head of the Office of National Assessments) to inquire into various aspects of national security. The review was completed in 1994.

=== Parliamentary Joint Committee inquiries ===
The Parliamentary Joint Committee completed several reviews and inquiries into ASIO during the 1990s. The first concerned the security assessment process. Another was held in September into "the nature, scope and appropriateness of the way in which ASIO reports to the Australian public on its activities". The Committee concluded that "the total package of information available to the Australian community about ASIO's operations exceeds that available to citizens in other countries about their domestic intelligence agencies." Pursuant to this, recommendations were made regarding the ASIO website and other publicly accessible information.

=== Transfer to Home Affairs ===
In July 2018, then-Prime Minister Malcolm Turnbull announced the creation of the Department of Home Affairs - a new ministry to include the Australian Federal Police, the Australian Border Force, and the Australian Security Intelligence Organisation. This meant the transfer of ASIO away from the Attorney-General's Department, although the Attorney-General would remain responsible for approving ASIO warrants. This move was somewhat criticised, with John Blaxland from the Australian National University warning against tampering with a system that was "arguably the envy of the world", saying "I have yet to see any compelling evidence that what we have is not working, or that there is a compellingly better option out there."

In July 2024, it was reported that ASIO was to be moved back to its original setting within the Attorney-General's Department. Under the new arrangement, the Department of Home Affairs retains responsibility for national security policy, its design and implementation, while operational control of ASIO shifts back to the Attorney-General's Department.

== Criticisms and controversies ==
=== Infiltration by Soviet spies ===
From the earliest years of ASIO's existence, possibly from its inception, the organization had been infiltrated by Soviet spies. This was admitted by ASIO beginning in 2016, though other sources had made earlier allegations that Soviet spies had deeply infiltrated ASIO at nearly all levels of intelligence and operations.

Over a period of at least five years in the 1970s, a senior officer named Ian George Peacock, who was in the counterespionage unit of ASIO, stole highly classified intelligence documents that had been shared with Australia and sold them to the Soviet Union. Peacock held the title of supervisor-E (espionage) and had top-secret security clearance. He retired from the ASIO in 1983 and died in 2006.

=== Raids on ASIO Central Office, 1973 ===
Accusations against ASIO were raised by the Attorney-General Lionel Murphy following a series of bombings from 1963 to 1970 on the consulate of Communist Yugoslavia in Australia by Croatian far-right militia. Murphy alleged that ASIO had withheld information on the group which could have led to preventative measures taken against further bomb attacks (however, Murphy was a member of the recently sworn in Labor government, which still held a deep-seated suspicion of ASIO).

On 15 March 1973, Murphy and the Commonwealth Police raided the ASIO offices in Melbourne. While some claim the raid was disastrous, serving little purpose other than to shake-up both ASIO and the Whitlam government, the findings of such investigations were not published.

=== The Sydney Hilton bombing allegations of conspiracy, 1978 ===
On 13 February 1978, the Sydney Hilton Hotel was bombed, one of the few domestic terrorist incidents on Australian soil. The Hotel was the location for the Commonwealth Heads of Government Meeting (CHOGM). Three people in the street were killed – two council workers and a policeman – and several others injured. Former police officer Terry Griffiths, who was injured in the explosion, provided some evidence that suggested ASIO might have orchestrated the bombing or been aware of the possibility and allowed it to proceed. In 1985, the Director-General of Security issued a specific denial of the allegation. In 1991 the New South Wales parliament unanimously called for a joint State-Federal inquiry into the bombing. However, the Federal government vetoed any inquiry.

=== Anti-terrorism bungle, 2001 ===
A few weeks after the 11 September 2001 attacks on the United States, mistakes led ASIO to incorrectly raid the home of Bilal Daye and his wife. It has been revealed that the search warrant was for a different address. The couple subsequently sought damages and the embarrassing incident was settled out of court in late 2005, with all material relating to the case being declared strictly confidential.

=== Kim Beazley-Ratih Hardjono investigation, 2004 ===
In June 2004, Kim Beazley was accused of having a "special relationship" with Ratih Hardjono when he was defence minister. Hardjono was allegedly accused of "inappropriately" photographing a secure Australian Defence facility, working with the embassy ID, and having a close working relationship with her uncle, a senior officer in BAKIN (Indonesian Intelligence). In July, journalist Greg Sheridan contacted the then head of ASIO, Dennis Richardson, and discussed a classified operational investigation. Later in July members of the Attorney General's department were still investigating the original allegation, making Richardson's comments premature and inaccurate. The whole episode was a salient reminder to politicians in Canberra of the British experience of 'agents of influence' and honeypots. Ratih Hardjono was married to Bruce Grant in the 1990s.

=== Detention and removal of Scott Parkin, 2005 ===
In September 2005, the visa of American citizen, Scott Parkin, was cancelled after Director-General of Security, Paul O'Sullivan, issued an adverse security assessment of the visiting peace activist. Parkin was detained in Melbourne and held in custody for five days before being escorted under guard to Los Angeles, where he was informed that he was required to pay the Australian Government A$11,700 for the cost of his detention and removal. Parkin challenged the adverse security assessment in the Federal Court in a joint civil action with two Iraqi refugees, Mohammed Sagar and Muhammad Faisal, who faced indefinite detention on the island of Nauru after also receiving adverse security assessments in 2005.

Prior to his removal, Parkin had given talks on the role of U.S. military contractor Halliburton in the Iraq war and led a small protest outside the Sydney headquarters of Halliburton subsidiary KBR. The Attorney-General at that time, Philip Ruddock, refused to explain the reasons for Parkin's removal, leading to speculation that ASIO had acted under pressure from the United States. This was denied by O'Sullivan before a Senate committee, where he gave evidence that ASIO based its assessment only on Parkin's activities in Australia. O'Sullivan refused to answer questions before a later Senate committee hearing after his legal counsel told the Federal Court that ASIO did not necessarily base its assessment solely on Parkin's activities in Australia.

=== Kidnap and false imprisonment of Izhar ul-Haque, 2007 ===
On 12 November 2007, the Supreme Court of New South Wales dismissed charges brought against a young medical student, Izhar ul-Haque. ASIO and the Australian Federal Police had investigated ul-Haque for allegedly training with Lashkar-e-Toiba in Pakistan, a declared terrorist organisation under the Security Legislation Amendment (Terrorism) Act 2002. However, the case against the medical student collapsed when it was revealed that ASIO officers had engaged in improper conduct during the investigation. Justice Michael Adams determined that because ul-Haque was falsely led to believe that he was legally compelled to comply with the ASIO officers, the conduct of at least one of the investigating ASIO officers constituted false imprisonment and kidnap at common law, and therefore key evidence against ul-Haque was inadmissible.

== Archival material ==
Non-current ASIO files are stored at the National Archives of Australia, and can be released to the public under the Archives Act 1983 after 30 years, unless they fall into any of 16 exemption categories itemised in section 33 of the Archives Act.

== See also ==
- Australian Federal Police (AFP)
- National Security Committee
- Australian Intelligence Community
  - Australian Secret Intelligence Service (ASIS)
  - Australian Signals Directorate (ASD)
  - Office of National Assessments (ONA)
  - Defence Intelligence Organisation (DIO)
  - Australian Geospatial-Intelligence Organisation (AGO)
- Oversight bodies
  - Parliamentary Joint Committee on Intelligence and Security (PJCIS)
  - Inspector-General of Intelligence and Security (IGIS)
- Relevant legislation
  - Australian Security Intelligence Organisation Act 1979 (ASIO Act)
  - Intelligence Services Act 2001 (ISA)
  - Intelligence Services Amendment Act 2004
- Overseas counterparts
  - Canada: Canadian Security Intelligence Service (CSIS)
  - China: Chinese Ministry of State Security (MSS)
  - New Zealand: New Zealand Security Intelligence Service (NZSIS)
  - UK: Security Service (MI5) and GCHQ
  - US: National Security Branch of the Federal Bureau of Investigation (NSB/FBI)
  - Russia: Federal Security Service (FSB)
  - Japan: Japanese National Police Agency and Public Security Intelligence Agency (PSIA)
