= Scott Parkin =

American activist (born 1969)

Scott Parkin (born 1969, Garland, Texas) is an anti-war, environmental and global justice organizer, former community college history instructor, and a founding member of the Houston Global Awareness Collective. He has been a vocal critic of the American invasion of Iraq, and of corporations such as ExxonMobil and Halliburton. Since 2006, he has worked as a campaigner for the Rainforest Action Network, organizing campaigns against Bank of America, Citibank, TXU and the Keystone XL Pipeline. He also organizes with Rising Tide North America. He is also the co-host and co-producer of the Green and Red Podcast.

== Detention and removal by Australian government ==
While Parkin was visiting Australia in 2005, the Australian Security Intelligence Organisation (ASIO) contacted him to request an interview, which he declined after being advised that it was not compulsory. Shortly after, he was assessed by ASIO to represent a threat to national security, leading to the cancellation of his visa and his detention by Australian Federal Police and immigration officials on September 10, 2005.

Parkin was kept in solitary confinement in a Victorian prison until he was removed on the September 15. He was not charged with any offence or provided with any explanation for his treatment beyond the advice that a "competent authority" considered him a threat to Australia's national security.

Upon his arrival in Los Angeles, Parkin was told that he was expected to pay -A$11,700 to the Australian government for the cost of his detention, the flight back to the US for himself and two Australian government escorts and their accommodation in Los Angeles for four nights (September 15-September 19).

While in Australia, Parkin participated in an anti-war protest outside the Sydney headquarters of then-Halliburton subsidiary KBR on August 31, and was also reported to have attended the 2005 Forbes Global CEO Conference protest. On the day of his detention, he was due to give a workshop entitled: "Bringing Down The Pillars - People power strategies against war and capitalism".

After Parkin's removal, The Australian reported that sources alleged he may have intended to advocate techniques such as throwing marbles underneath police horses. Parkin said he would never encourage such behaviour and a subsequent report issued on December 6 (see below) by the Inspector-General of Intelligence and Security said that these claims were "not a reliable guide to the ASIO assessment".

Despite the lack of details being provided by ASIO, it has been suggested that Scott Parkin may have been deported to test the Australian public's reaction to anti-terror laws being introduced around the same time as the deportation, a claim that has been denied by Australian Attorney-General Philip Ruddock.

On October 31, 2005, Director-General of Security Paul O'Sullivan gave evidence before a Senate Estimates Committee that Parkin was not involved in any violent activity in Australia. O'Sullivan also told the Committee that the adverse security assessment was related to Parkin's "behaviour subsequent to his arrival in Australia".

On 6 December 2005, the Attorney-General released the public version of a classified report by the Inspector-General of Intelligence and Security, Ian Carnell, detailing his investigation into the circumstances of Parkin's deportation. The public version of the report concluded that the adverse security assessment was made in accordance with legislative requirements. The report dismissed media allegations that Parkin had advocated "rolling marbles under the hooves of police horses", but did not detail any other specific allegations against Parkin. Carnell wrote:

While the precepts of natural justice would point to providing Mr Parkin with the details of the security assessment and allowing him to respond and suggest ways in which the evidence and considerations might be tested, security considerations ... would appear to reasonably preclude this.

In January 2006, Newsweek reported that the Pentagon's Counterintelligence Field Activity (CIFA) agency had monitored and filed a report on a June 2004 protest organised by Parkin's group, Houston Global Awareness Collective. According to Newsweek, CIFA filed a report on the protest in its database after 10 members of Parkin's group distributed peanut butter sandwiches to employees at Halliburton's Houston headquarters, in protest at allegations that Halliburton overcharged for military food contracts in Iraq.

On May 22, 2007, Parkin's supporters released a report, Where the bloody hell are you?, which included 26 statutory declarations detailing Parkin's political activities in Australia prior to the adverse security assessment. On the same day, legal counsel for ASIO head Paul O'Sullivan told the Federal Court that ASIO did not rely solely on information relating to Parkin's activities in Australia. The following day, O'Sullivan refused to answer questions before a Senate committee about the accuracy of his previous evidence that Parkin's security assessment was related to his activities in Australia.

== Federal court challenge ==
In December 2005, lawyers acting for Parkin lodged a Federal Court challenge seeking to quash the adverse security assessment. Parkin's lawyers were also acting for two Iraqi refugees, Mohammed Sagar and Muhammad Faisal, who received adverse security assessments from ASIO and were held in immigration detention for over five years. The case may test the power of the Attorney General, under the National Security Information Act, to prevent particular evidence from being heard in an open court.

Parkin's barrister was Julian Burnside, QC. In an interview on Radio National, Burnside said it may be difficult to appeal the adverse security assessment, and showed concern for the degradation of due process and transparency:

The difficulty that confronts us, potentially, is that the Attorney-General has got power under the National Security Information Act to certify conclusively that revealing the contents of the report would adversely affect Australia’s national security interests. And if he certifies that, then any court hearing our challenge will have to hold a private hearing in which the court considers whether or not to allow the evidence to be produced in court. And in that process the statute directs the Judge to give primary weight to the conclusive certificate of the Attorney, which looks (and it’s never been tested) but it looks as though it gives him the chance to stymie the process of examining the basis for the report.

On November 3, 2006, the Federal Court ruled that lawyers for Parkin and ASIO confer on the release of documents detailing the allegations against Parkin. On November 3, 2006 the ABC reported that Parkin, Sagar and Faisal won "the right to know why ASIO gave them adverse security assessments".

On November 28, 2006 ASIO was granted leave to appeal this decision after lawyers for the security agency argued that providing a list of documents relevant to the Parkin, Sagar and Faisel case would cause "irreparable harm" to Australia's national security. On May 22, 2007, the full bench of the Federal Court revoked ASIO's leave to appeal and ordered the matters be heard by the primary judge.

On November 2, 2007, Sundberg ordered discovery of documents related to the case, including Parkin's adverse security assessment, a classified ASIO "determination" setting out the criteria applied by ASIO in making the security assessment and records of ASIO's advice to the Minister for Immigration which led to the cancellation of Parkin's visa

ASIO's appeal of the order was heard by the full bench of the Federal Court in Melbourne on 28 February 2008. On July 18, 2008, Justices Jessup, North and Ryan rejected the appeal and ordered ASIO to produce the list of documents.

Parkin's solicitor, Ms Ann Gooley, said that counsel for ASIO acknowledged that the adverse security assessment may have been made because of people who Parkin associated with, even if Parkin was not aware of the implications of the associations at the time. Gooley noted that the Haneef case showed the dangers of using an "association" as the basis for decision making.

On 30 September 2009, the Federal Court ruled that ASIO did not need to produce the supporting documents.
