= Australian Secret Intelligence Service =

Australian foreign intelligence agency

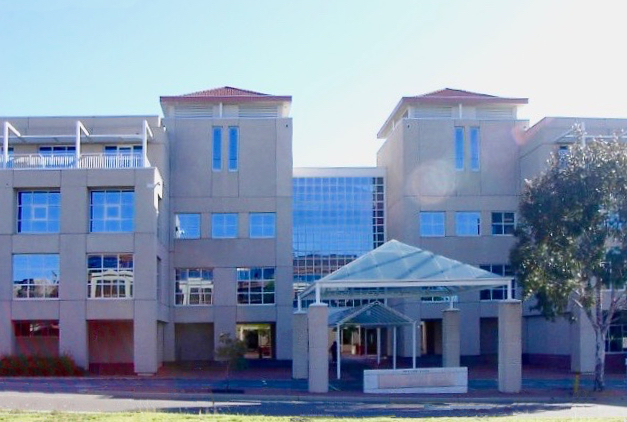
- The R.G. Casey Building, Canberra in 2004

Intelligence agency overview
- Formed: 13 May 1952; 74 years ago
- Type: Intelligence agency
- Jurisdiction: Australian Government
- Headquarters: R.G. Casey Building, Canberra, Australia
- Annual budget: A$840.02 million (US$631.59 million) (2025–26)
- Minister responsible: Penny Wong, Minister for Foreign Affairs
- Assistant Minister responsible: Tim Watts, Assistant Minister for Foreign Affairs
- Intelligence agency executives: Kerri Hartland, Director-General; Fabio Meloni, Deputy Director-General Operations
- Parent department: Department of Foreign Affairs and Trade
- Key documents: s. 61 of the Constitution, Intelligence Services Act 2001, Intelligence Services Amendment Act 2004
- Website: www.asis.gov.au

The Australian Secret Intelligence Service (ASIS /ˈeɪsɪs/) is the foreign intelligence agency of the Commonwealth of Australia, responsible for gathering, processing, and analysing national security information from around the world, primarily through the use of human intelligence. The service was formed in 1952; however, its existence remained secret within much of the government and to the public until 1972. ASIS is a primary entity of the Australian Intelligence Community.

ASIS is part of the Department of Foreign Affairs and Trade (DFAT) portfolio and has its headquarters in Canberra. Its director-general, currently Kerri Hartland, reports to the minister for foreign affairs. The service is comparable to the CIA (US) and MI6 (UK).

== History ==
On 13 May 1952, in a meeting of the Executive Council, Prime Minister Robert Menzies established ASIS by executive order under s. 61 of the Australian constitution, appointing Alfred Deakin Brookes as the first director-general of ASIS. The existence of ASIS remained secret even within the Australian Government until 1972.

Its Charter of 15 December 1954 described ASIS's role as 'to obtain and distribute secret intelligence, and to plan for and conduct special operations as may be required'. ASIS was expressly required to "operate outside Australian territory". A Ministerial Directive of 15 August 1958 indicated that its special operations role included conducting "special political action". It also indicated that the organisation would come under the control and supervision of the Minister for External Affairs rather than the Minister for Defence. At the time, ASIS was substantially modelled on the United Kingdom's Secret Intelligence Service, also known as MI6. ASIS was at one time referred to as MO9.

On 1 November 1972, the existence of ASIS was sensationally revealed by The Daily Telegraph which ran an exposé of recruitment of ASIS agents from Australian universities for espionage activities in Asia. Soon after The Australian Financial Review published a more in-depth piece on ASIS, the Australian Security Intelligence Organisation (ASIO), and the then Joint Intelligence Organisation (JIO), Defence Signals Division (DSD) and Office of National Assessments (ONA). It stated that "[t]he ASIS role is to collect and disseminate facts only. It is not supposed to be in the analytical or policy advising business though this is clearly difficult to avoid at times". The Ministerial Statement of 1977 stated that the "main function" of ASIS was to "obtain, by such means and subject to such conditions as are prescribed by the Government, foreign intelligence for the purpose of the protection or promotion of Australia or its interests".

On 21 August 1974, Prime Minister Gough Whitlam established the Royal Commission on Intelligence and Security (the first Hope Royal Commission, 1974–77) to investigate the country's intelligence agencies. On 25 October 1977, Prime Minister Malcolm Fraser publicly announced the existence of ASIS and its functions on a recommendation of the Commission.

In 1992, two reports were prepared on ASIS by officers within the Department of Prime Minister and Cabinet and the Office of National Assessments for the Secretaries Committee on Intelligence and Security (SCNS) and the National Security Committee (NSC). The Richardson Report in June examined the roles and relationships of the collection agencies (ASIO, ASIS and DSD) in the post-Cold War era. The Hollway Report in December examined shortfalls in Australia's foreign intelligence collection. Both reports endorsed the structure and roles of the organisations and commended the performance of ASIS.

The Intelligence Services Act 2001 (ISA) converted ASIS to a statutory body. The Act set out the functions of ASIS and the limits on those functions. Use of weapons by ASIS were prohibited (except for self-defence). Conduct of violent or para-military operations was also curtailed. The Act authorised the responsible minister to issue directions to the agency and required Ministerial authorisation for intelligence collection activities involving Australians, but limited the circumstances in which that could be done. The Act requires the responsible minister to make rules regulating the communication and retention of intelligence information concerning Australian persons, and provides for the establishment of a parliamentary oversight committee, then called the Parliamentary Joint Committee on ASIO, ASIS and DSD.

The Intelligence Services Amendment Act 2004 removed ISA prohibitions on ASIS operatives carrying firearms (but only for protection) and allows ASIS to work with foreign intelligence agencies such as the CIA or MI6 in the planning of paramilitary and combat operations provided ASIS is not involved in the execution of the operations.

== Royal Commissions examining ASIS ==
Three Royal Commissions have examined, among other things, ASIS and its operations: in 1974 and 1983 (the Hope Royal Commissions), and in 1994 (the Samuels and Codd Royal Commission).

=== First Hope Royal Commission ===
On 21 August 1974, the Whitlam Government appointed Justice Robert Hope to conduct a Royal Commission into the structure of Australian security and intelligence services, the nature and scope of the intelligence required and the machinery for ministerial control, direction and coordination of the security services. The Hope Royal Commission delivered eight reports, four of which were tabled in Parliament on 5 May 1977 and 25 October 1977. Aside from the observation that ASIS was "singularly well run and well managed", the report(s) on ASIS were not released. Results from the other reports included the Australian Security Intelligence Organisation Act 1979, the establishment of the ONA and the passage of the Office of National Assessments Act 1977.

=== Second Hope Royal Commission ===
On 17 May 1983, the Hawke Government reappointed Justice Hope to conduct a second Royal Commission into Australia's intelligence agencies. The inquiry was to examine progress in implementing the previous recommendations; arrangements for developing policies, assessing priorities and coordinating activities among the organisations; ministerial and parliamentary accountability; complaints procedures; financial oversight and the agencies' compliance with the law. As with the first Hope Royal Commission, the reports on ASIS and DSD, which included draft legislation on ASIS, were not made public.

=== Samuels and Codd Royal Commission ===
In response to a Four Corners TV program aired on 21 February 1994, the Minister for Foreign Affairs Gareth Evans announced on 23 February 1994 a "root and branch" review of ASIS. The Government appointed Justice Gordon Samuels and Mr Mike Codd to inquire into the effectiveness and suitability of existing arrangements for control and accountability, organisation and management, protection of sources and methods, and resolution of grievances and complaints. The Royal Commission reported in March 1995.

Four Corners reporter Ross Coulthart made allegations regarding intelligence held by ASIS on Australians. He claimed that "ASIS secretly holds tens of thousands of files on Australian citizens, a database completely outside privacy laws". The allegation was investigated and denied by Samuels and Codd (see below), but the Minister did acknowledge that ASIS maintained files. The Minister said: "ASIS does have some files, as one would expect in an organisation of that nature, even though its brief extends to activities outside the country rather than inside. They are essentially of an administrative nature." However, Samuels and Codd did find that certain grievances of the former officers were well founded. They appeared to support the officers' concerns regarding the grievance procedures:

Bearing in mind the context in which the members of ASIS work, it is not surprising that there should develop a culture which sets great store by faithfulness and stoicism and tends to elevate conformity to undue heights and to regard the exercise of authority rather than consultation as the managerial norm.

However, Samuels and Codd observed that the information published in the Four Corners program was "skewed towards the false", that "the level of factual accuracy about operational matters was not high", and, quoting an aphorism, that "what was disturbing was not true and what was true was not disturbing". They concluded that the disclosure of the information was unnecessary and unjustifiable and had damaged the reputation of ASIS and Australia overseas. The commissioners stated that "evidence presented to us of action and reaction in other countries satisfies us that the publication was damaging": They rejected any suggestion that ASIS was unaccountable or "out of control". They said, "its operational management is well structured and its tactical decisions are thoroughly considered and, in major instances, subject to external approval". They recommended that complaints regarding ASIS operations continue to be handled by the Inspector-General of Intelligence and Security (IGIS) but that staff grievances be handled by the Administrative Appeals Tribunal.

In addition to their recommendations, Samuels and Codd put forward draft legislation to provide a statutory basis for ASIS and to protect various information from disclosure. The Samuels and Codd Bill, like the bulk of the reports, was not made public.

== Activities ==
Since 2004, ASIS has been running anti-people smuggling operations inside countries such as Pakistan, Sri Lanka and Indonesia.

In 2013, intelligence provided by ASIS was crucial to the capture, after a 14-month manhunt, of a rogue soldier from the Afghan National Army, who had killed three Australian soldiers. The joint operation involved ASIS, AGO, the Defence Intelligence Organisation and Australian Signals Directorate, along with Britain's MI6 and Special Air Service, the United States' CIA and National Security Agency, and Pakistan's Inter-Services Intelligence.

In 2021, ASIS had deployed a small team to provide security and to help with the evacuation of Australian nationals and the nation's informants during the Kabul airlift in Afghanistan.

== Controversies ==
=== ASIS in Chile 1973 ===
An ASIS station was established in Chile out of the Australian embassy in July 1971 at the request of the CIA and authorised by then Liberal Party Foreign Minister William McMahon. New Labor Prime Minister Gough Whitlam was informed of the operation in February 1973 and signed a document ordering the closure of the operation several weeks later. On 1 July 1973, the ASIS station in Chile reported that it had shut down and destroyed all records. However, the last ASIS agent did not leave Chile until October 1973, one month after the CIA-backed 1973 Chilean coup d'état had brought down the Allende government. Two officers of ASIO were also based in Santiago, working as migration officers during this period. The incident was one of two that caused a confrontation between Whitlam and Bill Robertson, the director-general of ASIS, which culminated in Robertson's sacking on 21 October 1975, with effect from 7 November, just four days before Whitlam's own dismissal in the 1975 Australian constitutional crisis. Whitlam said Robertson had disobeyed instructions by delaying the closure of the ASIS station in Chile in 1973 and not informing Whitlam that ASIS had an active agent in East Timor in 1975. Robertson disputed the details in a personal statement lodged with the National Archives in 2009.

ASIS's involvement in Chile was revealed in 1974 when Whitlam set up the First Hope Royal Commission to investigate Australia's security services. Whitlam told parliament that "when my government took office, Australian intelligence personnel were working as proxies of the CIA in destabilising the government of Chile". After the coup by Augusto Pinochet, Whitlam's government created a special program for Chilean refugees to come to Australia. Under the program, about 6,000 Chileans came to Australia between 1974 and 1981 and hundreds more joined them as part of a family reunion program.

The National Archives of Australia holds documents related to ASIS operations to help the CIA undermine the government of Allende in the years 1971–1974. In 2021, the archives refused a request from Clinton Fernandes, professor of International and Political Studies at the University of New South Wales, to access records relating to ASIS operations in Chile. Heavily redacted versions of some documents were released to Fernandes in June 2021. The documents show that the ASIS base in Chile assisted the CIA's destabilisation of Allende's government by handling CIA-recruited Chilean assets and filing intelligence reports to CIA headquarters in Langley, Virginia. In November 2021, the Administrative Appeals Tribunal (AAT) upheld the decision to reject Fernandes's request for access to the documents. The AAT said the release of documents would "cause damage to the security, defence or international relations of the Commonwealth". Most of the AAT hearing was held behind closed doors, because Attorney-General Michaelia Cash issued a public interest certificate, suppressing the disclosure of evidence provided by ASIS, ASIO and the Department of Foreign Affairs and Trade.

=== The Favaro affair ===
During the lead-up to Indonesia's invasion of East Timor in 1975, ASIS paid a Dili-based Australian businessman, Frank Favaro, for information on local political developments. The leaking of his identity in late 1975 was another factor in the confrontation between Whitlam and Robertson. Bill Robertson disputed the reason for his dismissal in documents lodged with the National Archives in 2009.

=== The Sheraton Hotel incident ===
On 30 November 1983, ASIS garnered unwanted negative attention when a training operation held at the Sheraton Hotel, now the Mercure (Spring Street), in Melbourne went wrong. The exercise was to be a mock surveillance and hostage rescue of foreign intelligence officers. In March 1983, ASIS had begun training a covert team of civilians at Swan Island in Victoria whose role was to protect or release Australians who may be threatened or captured by terrorists overseas. The military in 1981 had established a counter-terrorist unit for operations only in Australia. The personnel involved in the training operation included ten operators, four ASIS officers and six ASIS civilian trainees, and two commandos from the Army Reserve 1st Commando Regiment with a sergeant participating as an observer in the hotel foyer.

The training operation involved junior officers who had undergone three weeks' prior training and who were given considerable leeway in planning and executing the operation. The mock hostage rescue was staged on the 10th floor of the hotel without the permission of the hotel's owner or staff. When ASIS operators were refused entry into a hotel room, they broke down the door with sledgehammers. The hotel manager, Nick Rice, was notified of a disturbance on the 10th floor by a hotel guest. When he went to investigate, he was forced back into the lift by an ASIS operator who rode the lift down to the ground floor and forcibly ejected Rice into the lobby. Believing a robbery was in progress, Rice called the police. When the lift started returning to the ground floor, ASIS operators emerged wearing masks and openly brandishing 9mm Browning pistols and Heckler & Koch MP5 submachine guns, two of them with silencers. They forced their way through the lobby to the kitchen, where two getaway cars were waiting outside the kitchen door. Police stopped one of the cars and arrested the occupants – two ASIS officers and three ASIS civilian trainees – who refused to produce any form of identification.

Within two days, the minister for foreign affairs, Bill Hayden announced that an "immediate and full" investigation would be conducted under the auspices of the second Hope Royal Commission, which was still in progress. A report was prepared and tabled by February 1984. It described the exercise as being "poorly planned, poorly supervised and poorly run", and recommended that measures be taken in training to improve planning and eliminate adverse impacts on the public.

Victoria Police conducted their own investigation but were frustrated because ASIS Director-General John Ryan refused to cooperate. Bill Hayden offered to provide the real names of the seven officers involved, in confidence. Premier of Victoria John Cain told Hayden that "as far as the police were concerned, there was no such thing as information in confidence".

Following the incident, The Sunday Age disclosed the names, or the assumed names, of five of the operators involved. The journalist noted that "according to legal advice taken by The Sunday Age there is no provision that prevents the naming of an ASIS agent". Although not included within the public version of the report, the Hope Royal Commission prepared an appendix that would appear to have dealt with the security and foreign relations consequences of The Sunday Age's disclosure of participants' names. Subsequently, in A v Hayden, the High Court held that the Commonwealth owed no enforceable duty to ASIS officers to maintain confidentiality of their names or activities. This is no longer the case following the assent of the Intelligence Services Act of 2001, whereby disclosing a person as "being, or having been, an agent or staff member of ASIS" is punishable by 10 years in prison.

At the time of the Sheraton Hotel incident, the extant Ministerial Directive permitted ASIS to undertake "covert action", including "special operations" which, roughly described, comprised "unorthodox, possibly para-military activity, designed to be used in case of war or some other crisis". Following the incident and the recommendations of the Royal Commission, the covert action function was apparently abolished. The functions of ASIS can be found in section 6 of the Intelligence Services Act, as can those functions which are proscribed by the act.

Ultimately, in executing the operation, the operators were found to have used considerable force, menacing a number of the staff and guests with weapons and physically assaulting the hotel manager. Hope found Ryan to be at fault for authorising the training operation in a public place using concealed weapons. Ryan resigned in February 1984. Hope said it was not part of his terms of reference to make findings or recommendations on whether any individual had committed any offence. However, he did note that the individuals could potentially be prosecuted by the State of Victoria with a long list of criminal offences, including possession of firearms without a licence, possession of prohibited implements (including machine guns, silencers and housebreaking tools), aggravated burglary in possession of a firearm, common assault, wilful damage to property, possession of a disguise without lawful excuse and numerous motor vehicle offences. More than a year after the raid, the Victorian Director of Public Prosecutions concluded that while certain offences had been committed, including criminal damage and assault with a weapon, there was insufficient evidence to charge any person with a specific offence.

Victorian Holdings Ltd, the company managing the hotel, subsequently took legal action against the Commonwealth on behalf of itself and 14 hotel staff. The matter was settled out of court; the hotel was offered $300,000 in damages. The total payout to the hotel and staff was $365,400.

=== Involvement in Papua New Guinea ===
Between 1989 and 1991, ASIS came under scrutiny following allegations relating to its role and activities in Papua New Guinea. It was alleged that ASIS had been involved in training Papua New Guinean troops to suppress independence movements in Irian Jaya and Bougainville. In 1997 it was alleged that ASIS and DSD had failed to collect, or the Government had failed to act upon, intelligence regarding the role and presence of Sandline contractors in relation to the independence movement in Bougainville.

=== Four Corners program ===
Towards the end of 1993, ASIS became the subject of media attention after allegations were made by former ASIS officers that ASIS was unaccountable and out of control. The Sunday Telegraph alleged that "ASIS regularly flouted laws, kept dossiers on Australian citizens ... and hounded agents out of the service with little explanation". In particular, it alleged that agents were being targeted in a purge by being threatened with criminal charges relating to their official conduct, reflecting a pattern which suggested to some that ASIS or a senior ASIS officer had been "turned" by a foreign intelligence service.

On 21 February 1994, Four Corners ran a program which aired the key allegations. Two former ASIS officers made claims regarding cultural and operational tensions between ASIS and the Department of Foreign Affairs and Trade. They claimed that embassy staff had maliciously or negligently compromised activities involving the running of foreign informants and agents and the defection of foreign agents to Australia. They claimed that their grievances had been ignored and that they were "deserted in the field" and made scapegoats by ASIS. The officers and the reporter, Ross Coulthart, also made claims regarding operational activities and priorities: the officers claimed that ASIS advice had been ignored by DFAT and the reporter repeated claims regarding ASIS operations aimed at destabilising the Aquino Government in the Philippines. He also made claims regarding ASIS assistance to MI6 in the Falklands War, in Hong Kong and in Kuwait for the benefit of British interests, including commercial interests, and potentially to the detriment of Australian national interests. The bulk of the personal statements by the officers concerned their private grievances. They raised two issues of public interest regarding the effect of secrecy on the operation of grievance procedures and the extent to which the Minister for Foreign Affairs and Trade was aware of or in control of ASIS operations. The reporter directly raised the issue of the appropriateness of ASIS operations, particularly with respect to priority setting in overseas postings and operations, cooperation with foreign intelligence services, and the privacy of Australian persons and organisations. By implication, the program queried the extent to which ASIS was or should be accountable to the Minister, to Government and to Parliament.

The following day, the Shadow Minister for Foreign Affairs called for an independent judicial inquiry into the allegations. He expressed particular concern about the nature of ASIS cooperation with foreign agencies and the defects in ASIS grievance procedures. He later called for the inquiry to examine the "poisoned relationship between ASIS and DFAT". A Democrats spokesperson called for a standing parliamentary committee.

Two days after the program aired, the Samuels and Codd Royal Commission was convened by Minister for Foreign Affairs Gareth Evans.

=== Ratih Hardjono, Bruce Grant and Gareth Evans ===
On 19 February 2000, Singapore journalist Susan Sim accused Ratih Harjono of working for her uncle, a senior BAKIN (Indonesian intelligence service) intelligence officer while working for the President of Indonesia. Earlier in her career as a journalist, Ratih was married to Bruce Grant, who during this period was senior policy adviser to Gareth Evans, co-authoring the book, Australia's foreign relations: in the world of the 1990s. Gareth Evans was responsible for ASIS from 1988 to 1996.

=== Alleged management and staffing problems ===
In 2005, The Bulletin ran an article based on allegations by serving ASIS officers that alluded to gross mismanagement of intelligence operations, staff assignments, and taskings, particularly with respect to the war on terrorism. The unnamed officers pointed out various problems within the agency that were plaguing the organisation's ability to collect vital and timely intelligence. By this, they meant the recruitment of "young mostly white university educated agents with limited language skills and little knowledge of Islam against poor, zealous extremists intent on becoming suicide bombers", the "inappropriate" assignment of "young female IOs [intelligence officers] against Islamic targets", in addition to poor staff retention rates, and general lack of officers possessing significant practical field experience. The officers also cited a lack of proper support given to intelligence officers tasked against terrorist targets, and the doctoring of intelligence by ASIS management, as also contributing to the lack of progress of the agency in the war on terrorism.

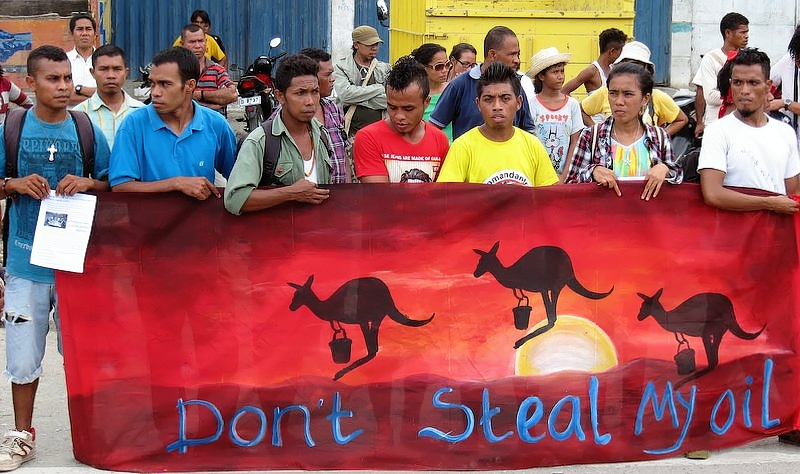
Demonstration in front of Australian embassy against the CMATS-treaty, December 2013

=== Australia–East Timor spying scandal ===
It was revealed in 2013 that ASIS planted devices to listen to the East Timorese government during negotiations over the Greater Sunrise oil and gasfields.

== See also ==
- Australian intelligence agencies

== Notes ==
=== References ===
- Samuels, Gordon J.; Codd, Michael H. (1995). Commission of Inquiry into the Australian Secret Intelligence Service, Report on the Australian Secret Intelligence Service (PDF) (Public ed.). Australian Government Publishing Service. ISBN 0-644-43201-2. Archived from the original (PDF) on 5 March 2016.
- Toohey, Brian; Pinwill, William (1989). Oyster: the Story of the Australian Secret Intelligence Service. Melbourne: Heinemann. ISBN 9780855612504.

== Credit ==
A large portion of the history of ASIS in this article was adapted from the Parliament of Australia Bills Digest No. 11 of 2001–02 of Intelligence Services Act 2001.
