= Mohammed Sagar =

Iraqi Shi'a Muslim refugee (born 1976)

Mohammed Sagar (born 1976, in Najaf) is an Iraqi, who was detained on Manus Island and Nauru between 2001 and 2006. Sagar became the last of approximately 1,300 refugees from the Middle East to be detained on Nauru under the Australian Government's "Pacific Solution" after an adverse security assessment was issued by the Australian Security Intelligence Organisation (ASIO). He resettled in Sweden in 2007 after the UN High Commissioner for Refugees' efforts to secure asylum in a third country finally met with success.

== Experiences as a refugee ==
At the age of 15, Sagar fled Najaf with his family during the massacre which followed the 1991 Shi'a Muslim uprising against Sadaam Hussein. Upon their return, his family found their home destroyed by a rocket, and Sagar was injured by an unexploded bomb as he helped to clear rubble. In 1997, after hearing rumours that his family was in danger, Sagar abandoned his microbiology studies and fled Iraq for Iran with his parents and siblings. In May 2001, he left Iran alone, travelling to Malaysia and Indonesia.

In October 2001, he boarded the Olong, a boat bound for Australian waters carrying 223 asylum seekers. Shortly after entering Australian waters, the Olong, which was designated Suspected Illegal Entry Vessel IV (SIEV IV) by the Australian Government, was intercepted by the Australian Navy vessel HMAS Adelaide and forced to return to international waters. After SIEV IV sank, its passengers were rescued by the crew of the Adelaide. The sinking of the SIEV IV triggered the children overboard scandal after then Immigration Minister Phillip Ruddock, Defence Minister Peter Reith and Prime Minister John Howard falsely claimed that passengers of SIEV IV had thrown their own children overboard.

Sagar was sent to Manus Island, Papua New Guinea with other asylum seekers from the SIEV IV. He was transferred to Nauru in September 2002.

== ASIO security assessment ==
While on Nauru, Sagar was interviewed by officers from the ASIO. In August 2005, Sagar and another Iraqi refugee, Muhammad Faisal, were notified that they had been assessed to represent a "risk to Australia's national security" and therefore would not be permitted to settle in Australia. Neither Faisal nor Sagar were informed of the reasons for the adverse assessment.

ASIO's adverse assessments effectively exposed Sagar and Faisal to the prospect of indefinite detention on Nauru, despite the Australian Government's recognition that their fears of persecution if returned to Iraq were genuine. The adverse assessments also undermined attempts by the UN High Commissioner for Refugees to secure asylum for Sagar and Faisal in a country other than Australia.

While in detention, Sagar set up a website, Refugees Left on Nauru, on which he posted photographs of the almost deserted refugee camp and described the psychological challenges faced by the last two refugees remaining on the island:

There might be people who are not aware of the real meaning of the word "detention." It simply means that you do not own your life any more, or in other words, you can't feel alive any more. Especially when you are held in the same situation for a long time with no signs of any changes that might happen in the near future.

In September 2006, Faisal became suicidal and was evacuated to a hospital in Brisbane, Australia, where he was able to apply directly for asylum to the Australian Government. This triggered a second ASIO security assessment, which found that Faisal did not present a risk to national security. In early 2007 Faisal was granted a permanent visa and allowed to stay in Australia. Sagar's adverse security assessment, however, remains intact.

== Federal Court case ==
In February 2006, Sagar and Faisal launched civil action against the Director-General of Security, Paul O'Sullivan in the Federal Court of Australia, seeking orders to quash the adverse security assessments.

On November 3, 2006 the ABC reported that Mohammed Sagar and Muhammad Faisal, along with deported US peace activist Scott Parkin won "the right to know why ASIO gave them adverse security assessments". ASIO subsequently appealed to the full court. Justices Ryan, North and Jessup are due to deliver their judgement on 18 July.

== Settlement in Sweden ==
In December 2006, the Swedish Government agreed to allow Sagar to settle in that country. In February the following year he left Nauru. He currently lives in Örnsköldsvik, a city in the north of Sweden.
