= George Sadil =

George Sadil (born circa 1936–37) is a former Russian analyst and translator who worked with the Australian Security Intelligence Organisation (ASIO) for nearly 25 years including during the height of the Cold War. After it had been revealed the ASIO had been compromised by a Russian KGB (Komitet Gosudarstvennoy Bezopasnosti) 'mole', investigations were held and after internal audits conducted by both ASIO (Jabaroo) and the Australian Federal Police (Operation Liver), Sadil was accused of being the mole. After raids on the homes of many of their analysts and translators, the authorities found highly classified documents in Sadil's home, he was then charged with possessing classified federal documents under the Crimes Act 1914. In 1994 the case against him collapsed. Sadil's profile did not match that of the mole in question, and prosecutors were unable to establish any kind of money trail between Sadil and the KGB.

Sadil had worked for ASIO since 1968.

Former KGB general Oleg Kalugin said Australian authorities never discovered the identity of the Canberra-based spy, who was paid thousands of dollars. Kalugin said Moscow used the information to penetrate deep into MI5, MI6, the CIA, and the FBI.

In 2023, the mole was identified as Ian George Peacock.
