= Rachel Noble =

Australian public servant

Rachel Noble PSM was the Director-General of the Australian Signals Directorate. She was appointed to the position in February 2020 and was the first woman to hold the position.

== Career ==
Noble was employed at the Australian Cyber Security Centre and prior to her ASD appointment had spent 20 years working in the public service.

Prior senior executive roles have included acting as Australia’s first national security CIO within the Department of the Prime Minister and Cabinet, and Deputy chief of the Australia-US satellite tracking facility at Pine Gap in the Northern Territory. She is also a former National Director of Intelligence and Chief Information Officer at the Australian Customs and Border Protection Service and Assistant secretary of governance, responsible for the overall governance and assurance framework for the Department of Defence.

Government offices
Preceded by Mike Burgess	Director-General of the Australian Signals Directorate; 2020–2024	Succeeded by Abigail Bradshaw
