= Charter of the Australian Security Intelligence Organization =

On July 6, 1950, Robert Menzies, Australian Prime Minister, issued a Directive titled the Charter of the Australian Security Intelligence Organization. The charter was an expanded and more specific form of the 1949 Directive for the Establishment and Maintenance of a Security Service issued by Ben Chifley.

Note the spelling 'organization' used in the Directive. The official title of ASIO was amended by legislation in 1999 to remove this spelling and apply the Australian standard spelling of 'organisation.'

== Text of the Directive ==
Charter of the Australian Security Intelligence Organization (A directive from the Prime Minister to the Director-General of Security.)

1. By virtue of your appointment as Director-General of Security, it is your duty to direct and maintain the Security Service established under the name of the Australian Security Intelligence Organization (hereinafter referred to as "the Organization").
2. The Organization forms part of the Attorney-General's Department, and the Attorney-General will be responsible for it to Parliament.
3. As Director-General of Security you will have direct access to the Prime Minister on all matters of moment affecting security which you think should be considered by or on behalf of the Government as a whole.
4. It is your responsibility to keep each Minister informed of all matters affecting security coming to your knowledge and which fall within the scope of his Department, and to confer as necessary with the Public Service Board with regard to matters affecting security in the Public Service of the Commonwealth.
5. The Organization is part of the defence system of the Commonwealth, and save as herein expressed has no concern with the enforcement of the criminal law. Its task is the defence of the Commonwealth and its Territories from external and internal dangers arising from attempts at espionage and sabotage, or from actions of persons and organizations, whether directed from within or without the country, which may be judged to be subversive of the security of Australia.
6. You will take especial care to ensure that the work of the Organization is strictly limited to what is necessary for the purposes of this task, and that you are fully aware of the extent of its activities. It is essential that the Organization should be kept absolutely free from any political bias or influence, and nothing should be done that might lend colour to any suggestion that it is concerned with the interest of any particular section of the community, or with any matters other than the safety of Australia. You will impress on your staff that they have no connexion whatever with any matters of a party political character and that they must be scrupulous to avoid any action which could be so construed.
7. No enquiry is to be carried out on behalf of any Government Department unless you are satisfied that an important public interest bearing on the safety of the Commonwealth as defined in paragraph 5 is at stake.
8. You and your staff will maintain the well-established convention whereby Ministers do not concern themselves with the detailed information which may be obtained by the Organization in particular cases, but are furnished with such information only as may be necessary for the determination of the issue.
9. Within the appropriation provided by Parliament, you are authorized in your discretion to appoint and dismiss staff, determine the establishment of the Organization, and arrange such methods and conditions of working for your staff as are necessary to ensure efficiency and secrecy. The terms and conditions of employment of your staff will be determined by agreement between yourself, the Solicitor-General and Secretary Attorney-General's Department, and the Chairman of the Public Service Board, and in default of such agreement by direction of the Prime Minister.
10. You will make with the Secretary, Department of the Treasury, and with the Auditor-General such financial arrangements as are necessary to preserve the confidential character of the Organization and its operations.
11. You will establish a comprehensive set of security records. In order to do this you will arrange that all Government Departments and agencies submit to you for inclusion in your records all information bearing on security which may be in or come into their possession. You will also arrange to have such access to the records of Government Departments and agencies as you may deem necessary for the purposes of your work.
12. For the purposes of the Organization you will establish the maximum co-operation with other agencies, whether of the Commonwealth or of the States, operating in the field of security (and, where appropriate, in the field of law-enforcement) in Australia, and will maintain effective contact with appropriate security agencies in other countries.

DATED the 6th day of July, 1950.

(Signed by R.G. Menzies)

Prime Minister.

== Expansion and revision ==
Both the Establishment and Charter Directives have been now largely superseded by federal legislation, notably by the Australian Security Intelligence Organisation Act 1979.
