= Australian Cyber Security Centre =

Australian Government lead agency for cybersecurity

- Program logo

Agency overview
- Formed: 27 November 2014; 11 years ago
- Jurisdiction: Australian Government
- Headquarters: Brindabella Business Park, Canberra, Australia
- Employees: 300
- Minister responsible: Richard Marles, Minister for Defence
- Agency executive: Rachel Noble, Head
- Parent agency: Australian Signals Directorate
- Website: cyber.gov.au

The Australian Cyber Security Centre (ACSC), the successor to the Cyber Security Operations Centre, is the Australian Government's lead agency for cyber security. The ACSC is part of the Australian Signals Directorate and is based at the Australian Security Intelligence Organisation headquarters in Brindabella Business Park in Canberra. The centre is overseen by the Cyber Security Operations Board and is the joint responsibility of the Minister for Defence.

== History ==
The Australian Cyber Security Centre was established in 2014, replacing the Cyber Security Operations Centre, also housed by the Australian Signals Directorate. In line with the recommendations of the 2017 Independent Review of the Australian Intelligence Community led by Michael L'Estrange and Stephen Merchant, Prime Minister Malcolm Turnbull announced that the role of the Australian Cyber Security Centre would be strengthened and that the Prime Minister's Special Adviser on Cyber Security, Alastair MacGibbon, would assume the responsibilities as the Head of the Centre within the Australian Signals Directorate, which was established as a statutory agency. The Special Adviser position was removed when MacGibbon left the public service in May 2019.

According to the seventh Annual Cyber Threat Report of the Australian Signals Directorate, which covered the 2025–26 financial year, the ACSC received more than 82,000 cybercrime reports during that year and responded to over 1,500 cyber security incidents.

== Role and responsibilities ==
The role of the Australian Cyber Security Centre is to:

- lead the Australian Government's operational response to cyber security incidents
- organise national cyber security operations and resources
- encourage and receive reporting of cyber attacks and cyber security incidents
- raise awareness of the level of cyber threats to Australia
- study and investigate cyber threats

The ACSC integrates the national security cyber capabilities across the Australian Signals Directorate cyber security mission, cyber security experts from the Digital Transformation Agency, the Defence Intelligence Organisation strategic intelligence analysts, the Computer Emergency Response Team, the Cyber Security Policy Division of the Department of Home Affairs, Australian Security Intelligence Organisation cyber and telecommunications specialists, Australian Federal Police cyber crime investigators, and Australian Criminal Intelligence Commission cybercrime threat intelligence specialists. The centre is also a hub for collaboration and information sharing with the private sector and critical infrastructure providers, state and territory governments, academia and international partners.

== Governance ==
The Head of the Australian Cyber Security Centre is a concurrent Deputy Director-General of the Australian Signals Directorate. The Special Adviser to the Prime Minister on Cyber Security within the Department of the Prime Minister and Cabinet previously served concurrently as the Head of the centre. The Special Adviser then became the National Cyber Coordinator within the Department of Home Affairs. In 2025, Defence Minister Richard Marles announced that Stephanie Crowe had been appointed head of the ACSC.

== Information Security Manual ==
The Information Security Manual (ISM) is a comprehensive cybersecurity framework produced by the Australian Signals Directorate and ACSC. It is designed for Australian organisations to apply to their own risk management frameworks and enhance their cybersecurity posture, to better protect information technology and operational technology systems, applications and data from cyber threats.

== See also ==
- Australian Signals Directorate
- Australian Cyber Collaboration Centre
- Australian Intelligence Community
- ECHELON
- National Cyber Security Centre (disambiguation)
