= Mike Burgess (intelligence chief) =

Australian intelligence chief

Mike Burgess AM
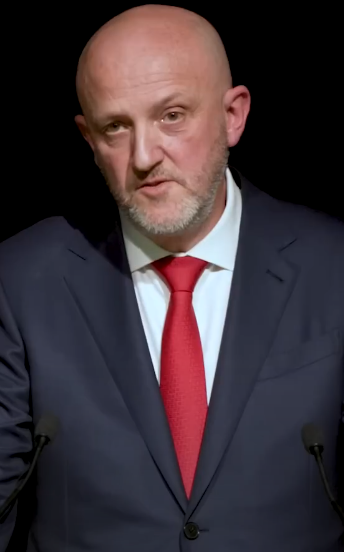
- Burgess in 2023.

14th Director-General of Security
- Incumbent
- Assumed office 16 September 2019
- Prime Minister: Scott Morrison; Anthony Albanese
- Preceded by: Duncan Lewis

Personal details
- Born: 1965 or 1966 England, United Kingdom
- Profession: Intelligence officer

Michael Paul Burgess AM (born 1965 or 1966) is an Australian intelligence official, and the current Director-General of Security in charge of the Australian Security Intelligence Organisation (ASIO). Prior to his appointment to this role on 16 September 2019, Burgess was director-general of the Australian Signals Directorate (ASD).

== Early life and education ==
Michael Paul Burgess was born in England in 1965 or 1966, and immigrated with his family to Adelaide, South Australia, in 1973 at the age of seven.

He was the first member of his family to study in higher education, receiving a degree in electronics engineering from the South Australian Institute of Technology in 1988.

== Intelligence career ==
Burgess has worked for his whole career as an intelligence, security, and technology professional, in both the public and private sectors.

Burgess joined the Defence Signals Directorate (later renamed Australian Signals Directorate, or ASD) in 1995, and worked there for 18 years, most notably as deputy director for cyber and information security, before leaving to work in the private sector. Working in the private sector, Burgess served as the chief information security officer at Telstra, before finding work as a cyber-security consultant and advisor. He also served on the federal government's naval shipbuilding advisory board. In early 2018, he returned to ASD as director-general.

In August 2019, prime minister Scott Morrison and minister for home affairs Peter Dutton announced Burgess had been appointed to replace the retiring Duncan Lewis as the head of ASIO.

In February 2022, Burgess announced that ASIO had foiled a plot by foreign interference that involved an attempt by a foreign government to install political candidates.

In November 2025, while warning about attempts allegedly made by the Chinese government to access the critical infrastructure of Australia through groups like Salt Typhoon and Volt Typhoon, Burgess vowed to continue speaking out despite Chinese officials complaining about him to the Australian Government and business groups.

In February 2026, Burgess met with Israeli President Isaac Herzog during the latter's state visit to Australia following the 2025 Bondi Beach shooting.

== Honours ==
In the 2024 King's Birthday Honours, he was appointed a Member of the Order of Australia, "for significant service to public administration, particularly national security and intelligence".

== Public face ==
Journalist Michelle Grattan described him in 2025 as "better known than some junior ministers" and a "relentless public promoter of ASIO's role and successes".

Government offices
| Preceded by Duncan Lewis | Director-General of Security; 2019–present | Incumbent |
| Preceded by Paul Taloni | Director-General of the Australian Signals Directorate; 2017–2019 | Succeeded by Rachel Noble |
