= Intelligence Services Act 2001 =

The Intelligence Services Act 2001 (ISA) is an Act of the Parliament of Australia, which made significant changes to the Australian Intelligence Community (AIC). The bill was introduced into Parliament on 27 June 2001 by then Minister for Foreign Affairs Alexander Downer. The Act was passed by Parliament on 29 September 2001 and came into effect on 29 October 2001.

The Act introduced three main reforms:

- it provided a statutory basis for the Australian Secret Intelligence Service (ASIS) and the Australian Signals Directorate (at the time called the Defence Signals Directorate, DSD), both of which had been previously established by and operated under executive order.
- increased powers for the Australian Security Intelligence Organisation (ASIO), ASIS and DSD.
- established the Parliamentary Joint Committee on ASIO, ASIS and DSD to replace the former Parliamentary Joint Committee on ASIO (which was established in 1988) and the Joint Select Committee on the Intelligence Services. The committee was appointed in March 2002. The committee's purview was expanded from 1 July 2004 to include DIO, DIGO and ONA, following the recommendations of the Flood Inquiry. On 2 December 2005, the name of the committee was changed to the Parliamentary Joint Committee on Intelligence and Security (PJCIS).

== See also ==
- Intelligence Services Amendment Act 2004
