= Intelligence Services Amendment Act 2004 =

The Intelligence Services Amendment Act 2004 was passed by the Parliament of Australia on 1 April 2004 as an amendment to the Intelligence Services Act 2001 (ISA) to grant controversial new powers to the Australian Secret Intelligence Service. The bill reverses ISA prohibitions on ASIS operatives carrying firearms and allows ASIS to work with foreign intelligence agencies to carry out paramilitary and violent activities provided ASIS is not involved in the execution of the operations.

The Intelligence Services Amendment Bill 2003 was introduced into Parliament on 15 October 2003 by Foreign Minister Alexander Downer, as an amendment to ISA. The Bill sought to amend ISA to allow ASIS to be involved in the planning and undertaking of paramilitary or violent activities by others, and provide, train with, and use weapons and self-defence techniques in certain circumstances (that is, where the responsible minister deems the circumstances suitable). The Bill proposed to allow ASIS to work with other organisations (such as the CIA or MI6) in paramilitary operations, provided ASIS staff and agents were not personally involved in carrying them out.

== See also ==
=== Legislation ===
- Intelligence Services Act 2001

=== Intelligence agencies ===
- Australian Security Intelligence Organisation (ASIO)
- Australian Secret Intelligence Service (ASIS)
- Australian Signals Directorate (ASD)
