= Directive for the Establishment and Maintenance of a Security Service =

On 16 March 1949, the Australian prime minister, Ben Chifley, issued a Directive for the Establishment and Maintenance of a Security Service, appointing South Australian Supreme Court Justice Geoffrey Reed as the first Director-General of Security. The need for an Australian security service (to be modelled on the United Kingdom Security Service, MI5) became apparent with the United States administration of the day expressing disaffection with the state of security in Australia, particularly in counter-intelligence.

Justice Reed advised the Prime Minister in August 1949 that he had decided to christen the service the Australian Security Intelligence Organisation (ASIO).

== Text of the Directive ==
Prime Minister's Memorandum to the Director-General of Security, being a Directive for the establishment and maintenance of a Security Service

1. You are appointed Director General of Security, and it is your duty to establish and maintain a Security Service.
2. The Security Service forms part of the Attorney General’s Department, and the Attorney General will be responsible for it to Parliament.
3. As Director General of Security you will have direct access to the Prime Minister at all times.
4. It is your responsibility to keep each Minister informed of all matters affecting security coming to your knowledge and which fall within the scope of his Department.
5. The Security Service is part of the Defence Forces of the Commonwealth and save as herein expressed has no concern with the enforcement of the criminal law. Its task is the defence of the Commonwealth from external and internal dangers arising from attempts at espionage and sabotage, or from actions of persons and organizations, whether directed from within or without the country, which may be judged to be subversive of the security of the Commonwealth.
6. You will take especial care to ensure that the work of the Security Service is strictly limited to what is necessary for the purposes of this task and that you are fully aware of the extent of its activities. It is essential that the Security Service should be kept absolutely free from any political bias or influence, and nothing should be done that might lend colour to any suggestion that it is concerned with the interests of any particular section of the community, or with any matters other than the defence of the Commonwealth. You will impress on your staff that they have no connection whatever with any matters of a party political character and that they must be scrupulous to avoid any action which could be so construed.
7. No enquiry is to be carried out on behalf of any Government Department unless you are satisfied that an important public interest bearing on the defence of the Commonwealth as defined in paragraph 5 is at stake.
8. You and your staff will maintain the well established convention whereby Ministers do not concern themselves with the detailed information which may be obtained by the Security Service in particular cases, but are furnished with such information only as may be necessary for the determination of the issue.
9. You are authorised in your discretion to engage and dismiss staff and to arrange such methods and conditions of working for your staff as are necessary to ensure efficiency and secrecy.
10. You will establish a comprehensive set of security records. In order to do this you will arrange that all Government Departments and agencies submit to you for inclusion in your records all information bearing on security which may be in or come into their possession. You will also arrange to have such access to the records of Government Departments and agencies as you may deem necessary for the purposes of your work.

DATED the 16th day of March, 1949.

(signed by Ben Chifley)

Prime Minister.

== Expansion and revision ==
On 6 July 1950 Prime Minister Robert Menzies issued an expanded and more specific Directive titled Charter of the Australian Security Intelligence Organization on the appointment of Colonel Charles Spry as the new Director-General of Security.

Both the Establishment and Charter Directives have been now largely superseded by federal legislation, notably by the Australian Security Intelligence Organisation Act 1979.
