= Muhammad Faisal =

Iraqi refugee

Muhammad Faisal is an Iraqi refugee who was detained on the island of Nauru between 2001 and 2006 under the Australian Government's "pacific solution". Faisal became the second last Iraqi refugee to leave Nauru after he was initially refused a protection visa on the basis of an adverse security assessment issued by the Australian Security Intelligence Organisation (ASIO).

== Attempt to apply for asylum ==
Faisal was one of 227, mostly Iraqi, refugees who boarded an Indonesian vessel, the Aceng, in August 2001. After a nine-day journey, the Aceng approached the Ashmore Islands, an Australian territory where the refugees believed they could apply for asylum. The Aceng was intercepted by Royal Australian Navy vessels acting under Operation Relex, an Australian Government operation designed to prevent asylum seekers reaching the Australian migration zone by sea.

After attempts to force the Aceng to leave the Ashmore Islands contiguous zone were abandoned, the passengers of the Aceng were transferred to the warship HMAS Manoora. Manoora, which had a capacity for only 450 people, was already carrying approximately 400 mostly Afghan asylum seekers transferred from the MV Tampa, the Norwegian cargo ship at the centre of the diplomatic crisis which triggered the Australian Government's policy of off-shore detention.

Manoora sailed to a location in international waters off Darwin, where she was reprovisioned. The then Prime Minister, John Howard, told journalists: "At no stage did this latest vessel reach Australian territorial waters. As a result questions of application for asylum status do not arise."

Upon Manoora’s arrival in Nauru, many of the Iraqi asylum seekers refused to leave the vessel. After 12 days, they were removed from Manoora by force.

== ASIO security assessments ==
While Faisal's claim to asylum was recognised by the Australian Government, his resettlement was prevented after the Australian Security Intelligence Organisation (ASIO) assessed both he and another Iraqi refugee, Mohammed Sagar, to be "direct or indirect" threats to Australia's national security in 2005.

While in detention, Faisal suffered severe depression, leading to his evacuation to Brisbane in September 2006. A second security assessment conducted by ASIO found that Faisal was not a security threat and he was permitted to settle in Australia. Faisal has never been informed of the reasons for the initial adverse assessment.

== Legal challenge ==
Faisal and Sagar are suing the Director-General of Security, Paul O'Sullivan in the Federal Court in an effort to determine the reasons for ASIO's adverse assessments. In November 2007, the court ordered discovery of documents including Faisal and Sagar's adverse security assessments, but ASIO appealed to the Full Court. Justices Ryan, North and Jessup were due to deliver their judgement on 18 July.

The court upheld the right of the court upheld the right of the ASIO to keep the grounds of the assessments secret. A further appeal was also rejected by the government.
