= Bruce Grant (writer) =

Australian journalist (1925–2022)

- Grant in the 1960s
- Born: 4 April 1925; Perth, Western Australia, Australia
- Died: 3 August 2022 (aged 97); Melbourne, Victoria, Australia
- Education: University of Melbourne
- Occupations: Journalist; foreign correspondent; government advisor; diplomat; novelist; political commentator
- Spouses: Enid; Joan; Ratih
- Children: Susan; Johanna; Jaems; David; Ben
- Writing career
- Period: 1950s–2017
- Genres: Journalism, fiction, history
- Subjects: Cinema, theatre, politics
- Notable works: Grant, Bruce (1964), Indonesia, Melbourne University Press and Cambridge University Press *Grant, Bruce (1979), The boat people, Harmondsworth, Penguin, ISBN 978-0-14-005531-3
- Notable awards: Distinguished Fellow, Australian Institute of International Affairs (2010); Doctor of Letters (honoris causa), Monash University (2013)

Bruce Alexander Grant (4 April 1925 – 3 August 2022) was an Australian journalist, foreign correspondent, government advisor, diplomat, novelist and author of several books on Australian politics and foreign policy.

== Early life ==
Grant was born in Perth on 4 April 1925, and grew up in Kalgarin in outback Western Australia. His success in a state exam won him a place at Perth Modern School.

== Journalist ==
Grant cut short his final year of secondary schooling to join Perth afternoon newspaper, the Daily News as a reporter. After military service, in 1946 he married Enid Mary Walters and they lived with children Susan, Johanna and James at 3 Hawthorn Gve. Hawthorn. He studied arts at the University of Melbourne, under Manning Clark (to whom later in London he became close), and where he could combine the academic study with a diploma course in journalism. From that he launched a career writing criticism on Australian film and theatre noting in 1958, that;

If we get a dramatist with the same poetic vision for lonely heroism as the painter Sidney Nolan and novelist Patrick White, the stage will need more air .

From 1951 was employed as film critic, by Melbourne's The Age newspaper where he was the only university graduate on staff. From 1953 he also presented film reviews in a radio program on 3AR, and promoted the idea of a Melbourne film festival. In 1954, then living at 29 Torbay St., Macleod, he left the country to become the paper's London correspondent, writing a column entitled "A Window In London", then was joined by wife Enid, whose father died in an accidental drowning shortly before her departure.

In the UK Grant covered subjects as diverse as Britain's "Color Problem," buskers, Labour party disunity, Malta's bid for independence, London's premiere of the Australian play Summer of the Seventeenth Doll; Robert Menzies' 1956 failed attempt to negotiate with Egypt's president Gamal Nasser during the Suez Crisis; and the Hungarian revolution. Conversely he was writing features on Australian subjects, such as the Eureka Stockade, a shearers' strike, and education in the Outback, for The Guardian, and occasionally for its sister paper The Observer, whose Guy Wint wrote one of the first reviews of Grant's Indonesia in 1964, which he said; "must be the model of its kind."

In September 1958 he flew from the UK to Harvard University via New York.

In 1964, Grant resigned as The Age’s Washington correspondent, having reported from there during the terms of two Presidents, Kennedy and Johnson.

== Intellectual, creative and administrative contributions to the arts ==
Grant also wrote for magazines as varied as Walkabout, The New Yorker, Mademoiselle, Playboy, Cleo, The Port Phillip Gazette, The Bulletin, Quadrant, Overland and Meanjin, and was an author of three novels on the theme 'Love in the Asian Century', and of short stories, poetry, and essays including "The Great Pretender at the Bar of Justice," written at the trial of Slobodan Milošević, published in The Best Australian Essays 2002; and "Bali: The Spirit of Here and Now," written after the October 2002 bombings, published in The Best Australian Essays 2004.

He spent periods researching and teaching in universities, including as a Nieman Fellow at Harvard, and a member of the councils of Monash, where he lectured in statecraft to young diplomats, and Deakin universities.

Grant promoted Australian culture, and its links with Asia as chair of the Australian Dance Theatre, and the Victorian Premier's Literary Awards, and president of Melbourne's International Film Festival, and of the Spoleto Festival, which became the Melbourne International Arts Festival.

== Foreign affairs ==
Grant's first book Indonesia of 1964 came at a time of high tension between Britain and Indonesia over the year-old Federation of Malaysia, which Indonesian leaders opposed and which resulted in the Indonesia–Malaysia confrontation. He was subsequently witness to, and an influence on, centres of power in Australia for several decades, as journalist and foreign correspondent, diplomat, public intellectual, and advisor to Menzies, whose letter of reference to ambassadors facilitated his reporting as Asian correspondent, and to subsequent governments from Whitlam to Hawke and Keating.

Grant was chairman of the Australia-Indonesia Institute and his book Indonesia (1964) is widely regarded as an important study of Australia's relationship with its regional neighbour.

From 1972 Grant advised the new prime minister Gough Whitlam, who “startled officials at a meeting by introducing me as his Dr Kissinger,” and appointed Grant as Australian High Commissioner to India (1973–1976) in which post he was an early advocate of the importance of Asia to Australia, having asked as he diverged from his career as journalist;

Can the newspapers stop Australia from turning inward, from becoming isolationist? (Roy Milne Memorial Lecture, 7 August 1969)

Grant campaigned to abolish the White Australia policy, opposed the Vietnam war as counterproductive to Australia's credibility in S.E. Asia, and joined the Australian Committee for a New China Policy, urging recognition of the People's Republic of China. Through his The Boat People he analysed, and promoted understanding of, the political causes and social ramifications of increasing numbers of Vietnamese refugees arriving by boat on Australia's shores.

Consultant to the federal Minister for Foreign Affairs and Trade, Gareth Evans, 1988–91, they co-wrote Australia's Foreign Relations in the World of the 1990s (1991).

In 2008, Grant initiated the colloquium 'Australia as a Middle-Ranking Power' hosted in Canberra at Manning Clark House in Conjunction with the Australian Institute of International Affairs.

== Legacy ==
In 2017, Grant released his memoir Subtle moments: scenes on a life's journey, named from a phrase from Albert Camus who wrote of "that subtle moment when man glances backward over his life ... contemplat[ing] that series of unrelated actions which become his fate"

Bruce Grant died 3 August 2022, at the age of 97. He was survived by his sister, Jocelyn, and four of his five children; Susan, Jaems, David and Ben, six grandchildren and two great-grandchildren. He was predeceased by his sister Audrey, daughter Johanna, and first wife Enid.

== Awards ==
- 2003: Doctor of Letters (honoris causa), Monash University
- 2010: Distinguished Fellow, Australian Institute of International Affairs

== Books ==
- Grant, Bruce (1964). Indonesia (1st ed.). Melbourne University Press and Cambridge University Press.
- Grant, Bruce; Australian Institute of International Affairs (1969), Foreign affairs and the Australian press, Australian Institute of International Affairs
- Laking, G. R. (George Robert); Grant, Bruce, 1925–; Castle, L. V; New Zealand Institute of International Affairs (1970), New Zealand and Australia : foreign policy in the 1970s : papers read at the 1969 Conference of the Institute, Price Milburn for the New Zealand Institute of International Affairs, ISBN 978-0-7055-0266-5
- Grant, Bruce; Australian Institute of International Affairs (1972), The crisis of loyalty : a study of Australian foreign policy (Rev. ed.), Angus and Robertson [for] the Australian Institute of International Affairs, ISBN 978-0-207-12472-3
- Whitlam, Gough; Grant, Bruce, 1925- (1973), Labor in power, Victorian Fabian Society
- Hickman, Arthur Thomas Godfrey (1977), Grant, Bruce (ed.), Arthur and Eric : an Anglo-Australian story from the journal of Arthur Hickman, Heinemann Australia, ISBN 978-0-85561-041-8
- Grant, Bruce (1978), The security of South-East Asia, International Institute for Strategic Studies, ISBN 978-0-86079-017-4
- Grant, Bruce; Flinders University (1978), Asia, war and peace, Flinders University of South Australia
- Grant, Bruce (1980), Cherry Bloom, Aurora Press; [London] : [Distributed by H.F.L.], ISBN 978-0-86748-000-9
- Grant, Bruce (1979), The boat people, Harmondsworth, Penguin, ISBN 978-0-14-005531-3
- Grant, Bruce; Grant, Bruce, 1925- (1982), Gods & politicians, Allen Lane; Ringwood, Vic. : Penguin Australia, ISBN 978-0-7139-1426-9
- Grant, Bruce (1983), The Australian dilemma : a new kind of Western society, Macdonald Futura Australia, ISBN 978-0-86771-003-8
- Grant, Bruce (1985), Australia and the twenty-first century, Australian National University, ISBN 978-0-86784-751-2
- Grant, Bruce (1988), What kind of country? : Australia and the twenty-first century, Penguin, ISBN 978-0-14-010681-7
- Grant, Bruce, 1925-; H.V. Evatt Memorial Foundation (1989), Australia in a world economy : proceedings of a seminar Oct 15, 1988, H.V. Evatt Memorial Foundation
- Grant, Bruce (1995), The Budd family, Hyland House, ISBN 978-1-875657-53-7
- Evans, Gareth; Grant, Bruce, 1925-; Evans, Gareth, 1944- (1995), Australia's foreign relations : in the world of the 1990s (2nd ed.), Melbourne University Press, ISBN 978-0-522-84657-7
- Grant, Bruce (1996), Indonesia (3rd ed.), Melbourne University Press, ISBN 978-0-522-84745-1
- Grant, Bruce (1999), A furious hunger : America in the 21st century, Melbourne University Press, ISBN 978-0-522-84792-5
- Grant, Bruce (2004), Fatal attraction : reflections on the alliance with the United States, Black Inc., ISBN 978-0-9750769-3-4
- Grant, Bruce; Masters, Diane; Royal Botanic Gardens, Melbourne (2006), The Governor's moment, Grant Pub, ISBN 978-0-646-46657-6
- Marsella, Anthony J.; Aukahi Austin, Ayda; Grant, Bruce, eds. (2006). Social Change and Psychosocial Adaptation in the Pacific Islands: Cultures in Transition (International and Cultural Psychology). USA: Springer.
- Conley Tyler, Melissa H; Miller, Geoff (2008), Australia as a Middle Power : Report of a Colloquium on 'Australia as a Middle-Ranking Power' Proposed by Bruce Grant, Leading Writer on International Affairs, and Hosted in Canberra by Manning Clark House in Conjunction with the Australian Institute of International Affairs, Australian Institute of International Affairs, ISBN 978-0-909992-55-2
- Grant, Bruce (2014), A young woman from China, [South Yarra, Victoria] Bruce Grant, ISBN 978-0-9925514-0-7
- Grant, Bruce (3 December 2014), The last kiss, [Melbourne?, Victoria] [Bruce Grant] (published 2014), ISBN 978-0-9925514-2-1
- Boston, Melbourne, Oxford, Vancouver Conversazioni on Culture and Society; Pizzey, Dorothy, (writer of introduction.); Grant, Bruce (writer of introduction.); Blainey, Geoffrey; Burnside, Julian; Kelly, Paul; Kimball, Roger; Lawriwsky, Michael L.; Boston, Melbourne, Oxford, Vancouver Conversazioni on Culture and Society (issuing body) (2014), The Great War : causes, consequences, reconsiderations : 4 August 2014 Melbourne, Vancouver Conversazioni on Culture and Society, Boston, Melbourne, Oxford
- Grant, Bruce (25 March 2015), Crossing the Arafura Sea, [Melbourne?, Victoria] [Bruce Grant] (published 2015), ISBN 978-0-9925514-4-5
- Grant, Bruce (2017), Subtle moments : scenes on a life's journey, Monash University Publishing, ISBN 978-1-925495-35-5
