= United States Department of Defense China Task Force =

Task force announced by Joe Biden in Early 2021

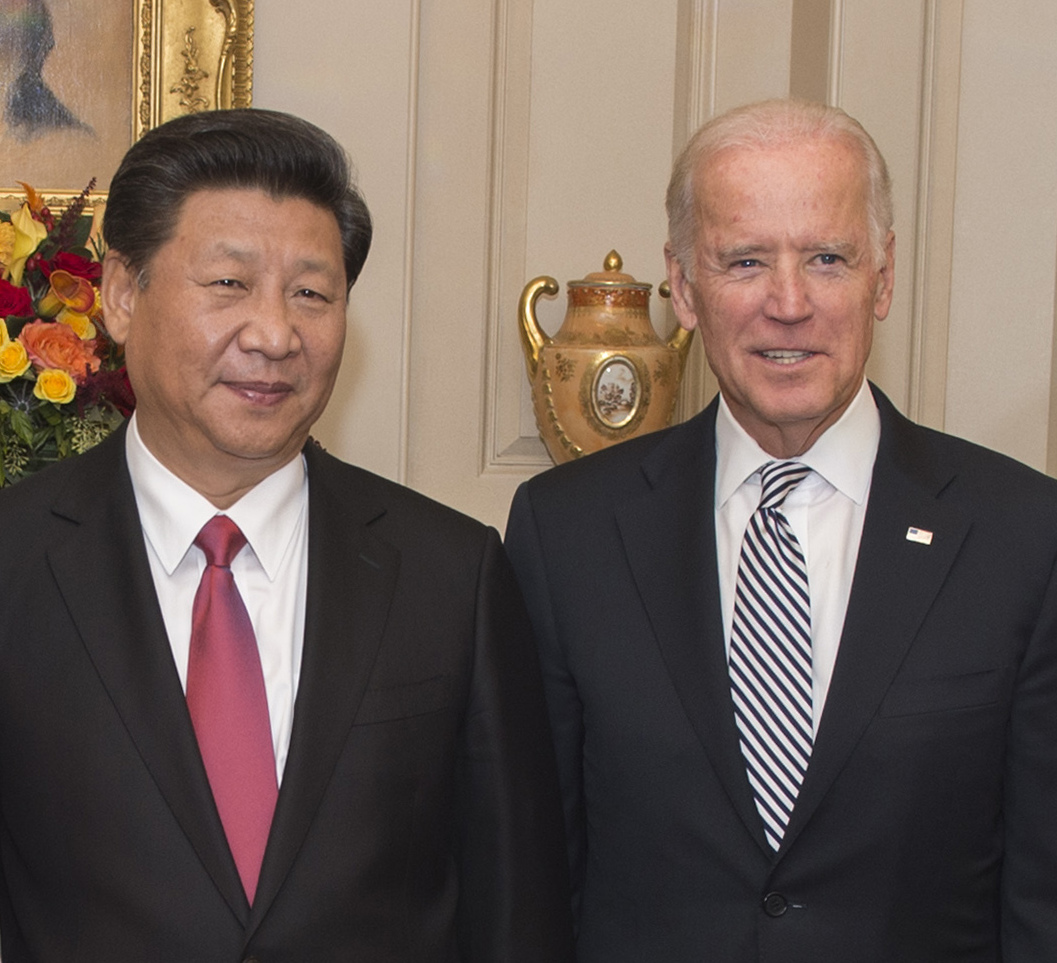
Chinese leader Xi Jinping and then-US Vice President Joe Biden in 2015. Announcing a Defense Department China Task Force in 2021, Biden said it would help the US "win the competition of the future." Xi said that China sought cooperation and that confrontation would be catastrophic.

The United States Department of Defense China Task Force was announced by the United States president Joe Biden on February 10, 2021. Biden said the task force would help the United States "win the competition of the future" with China. According to the DOD News service, the task force will be led by Ely Ratner, an assistant to US Secretary of Defense Lloyd Austin III. On the day the task force was announced, Chinese leader Xi Jinping said that China sought cooperation with the United States, but that confrontation would be "definitely catastrophic for both countries and the world."

== Background ==
=== Trump administration ===
A "China task force" was first announced by Republican Party congressmen to the United States House of Representatives in May 2020, and was composed of 15 Republican representatives. In September 2020, the task force unveiled over 400 policy recommendations for the United States concerning China, recommending a focus on human rights in China, the COVID-19 pandemic, and China's growing influence in the world. The task force was led by Republican Mike McCaul of Texas, who was at the time the senior member of the House Foreign Affairs Committee.

=== Biden administration ===
According to the Financial Times and the German Tagesschau, US-China relations were at their lowest point in four decades when Biden took the office of US president in 2021, and Biden indicated his administration would continue a "tough posture towards Beijing." CNBC stated that China became more influential in global commerce and international relations prior to the creation of the task force. A former Trump official who helped shape a more aggressive foreign policy stance towards China, Elbridge Colby, endorsed the work of the task force, saying that the Biden administration had "downplay[ed] the importance of hard power." Another Trump advisor, director of the Hudson Institute Michael Pillsbury, also endorsed the task force, saying "If China is our main challenge, we’re going to need a new command structure and some kind of czar over all the [Pentagon] units involved in our relationship with China."

Announcing the creation of the task force, US President Biden described China as the "most serious competitor" of America, and said that the task force would allow the United States to "win the competition in the future." According to Biden, the task force would help defend American interests in Asia and globally. Biden officials had criticized China over disagreements regarding Hong Kong, the Xinjiang region, and Taiwan before the creation of the task force.

=== US Military view ===
US Secretary of Defense Lloyd J. Austin III and his deputy secretary Kathleen Hicks have described China as a "pacing threat" to the United States. Before the creation of the China task force, the US military conducted maneuvers in the South China sea using two aircraft carriers, the USS Nimitz and the USS Theodore Roosevelt (CVN-71). In widely reported statements, Austin said that if China intends to build a military comparable to that of the United States by 2050, "I intend to make sure that never happens."

=== Chinese view ===
In a phone call between Chinese leader Xi Jinping and Biden hours after the announcement of the task force, Xi said that cooperation between the US and China was preferable, and that confrontation would be "definitely catastrophic for both countries and the world."

== Structure ==
The task force will be composed of 15 members drawn from the US Army, the US intelligence community, and the offices of the Secretary of Defense and the Joint Chiefs of Staff. It will be directed by Pentagon official Ely Ratner. Ratner had earlier worked for the US State Department on Chinese and Mongolian affairs, and had later worked as Biden's deputy national security advisor.

== Operations ==
=== Diplomatic ===
The task force was announced hours before a phone call between US President Joe Biden and Chinese leader Xi Jinping. On the same day, US officials met with a Taiwanese representative in the US, and the US State Department announced it would be "deepening ties with Taiwan." The statement said that alliances would be an important method of US competition against China and a focus of the task force.

=== Military ===
According to US Defense Department officials, the task force would address issues including the deployment of military forces, intelligence, and alliances.

Announcing the creation of the task force, the DOD News service said that the United States would conduct military operations in the waters surrounding China.

The Pentagon announced that the task force would deliver a report, which would not be made public, to Lloyd Austin and some members of Congress within four months.

== See also ==
- China–United States relations
- China–United States trade war
- Quadrilateral Security Dialogue
