= Ratih Hardjono =

Indonesian journalist (born 1960)

- Born: 6 December 1960 (age 65)
- Known for: Journalism, State Secretary

Ratih Hardjono (born 6 December 1960) is an Indonesian journalist for Kompas, an author, and a public affairs consultant. Her first book, White Tribe of Asia, a discussion of Australia's culture, history and politics, was published in 1993. She was Presidential Secretary to Abdurrahman Wahid, and in 2000, she served as Programme Coordinator Information and Publication for United Nations Development Programme (UNDP) Indonesia. Two years later, she co-edited a book, The Poor Speak Up, 17 Stories of Corruption, for the World Bank. Hardjono married Fajrul Falaakh, vice dean of law at Gadjah Mada University.

== Biography ==
=== Early years ===
Hardjono is from Kramat Jati, East Jakarta and was born on 6 December 1960. Her father followed the Javanese beliefs of Kejawaen, while her mother, Joan Hardjono, was born in Australia and was Catholic. Hardjono studied at the University of Sydney, Australia. In 1993, it was announced that she had received a Nieman Fellowship (1994) from Harvard University, Boston. She was the third Indonesian to receive such a scholarship, after the journalist Sabam Siagian and poet Goenawan Mohamad.

=== Press career ===
Harjono worked with the Indonesian daily Kompas for several years. She was one of their correspondents in Australia but also wrote much about the transition of countries from military rule to democracy, as well as the dissolution of the Soviet Union, military coups, and elections in the United States and Australia.

=== Political career ===
Hardjono became an assistant to Abdurrahman Wahid in 1998. After Wahid was elected president, she served as his State Secretary beginning in November 1999. As State Secretary, she worked to promote freedom of the press and is noted as having built the first civilian Presidential office since the fall of Sukarno 35 years prior. Her other duties included the preparation for state functions attended by the president and vice president as well as presidential tours. She also dealt with the press and performed administration duties, which included the supervision of 500 civil servants in charge of the maintenance of the presidential residences. However, according to The Jakarta Post sources at the Merdeka Palace reported that she did not get along well with Wahid's wife Sinta Nuriyah; Furthermore, she was also unpopular with clerics within the Muslim organisation Nahdlatul Ulama, which served as Wahid's political power base, because they disputed her claims that she was descended from an eminent 19th century kyai. Ratih was also accused of being an Australian spy due to her connections to Australia. Greg Sheridan, foreign editor of The Australian, has dismissed the spying accusations as having no shred of evidence, and attributes it to internal government politicking against Kim Beazley.

Hardjono resigned in mid-March 2000 with effect from 1 April to prepare for her wedding and to "avoid corruption, collusion, and nepotism". She was replaced by Djoko Mulyono.

=== After politics ===
After her resignation, Hardjono became Programme Coordinator, Information and Publication for the United Nations Development Programme, representing Indonesia. She also coedited The Poor Speak Up, 17 Stories of Corruption in 2002. She still writes as a freelancer.

Ratih has been Secretary General for the NGO Indonesian Community for Demokrasi (KID) since 2005, which is an NGO working in adult education in democracy by establishing Schools of Democracy at the District levels across Indonesia.

She also is a Senior Advisor at Albright Stonebridge Group.

== Personal life ==
Hardjono is married to Fajrul Falakh, vice dean of law at Gadjah Mada University, a politician and once deputy chair of the Nahdlatul Ulama with whom she resides in Jakarta and by whom she has twin sons. Her first husband was Australian journalist Bruce Grant.

== Selected publications ==
- 1992, Suku putihnya Asia : perjalanan Australia mencari jati dirinya
- 1993, White tribe of Asia : an Indonesian view of Australia
- 1995, Australian business people in Asia
- 2001, Women and Journalism – Reporting on War, Listening to Women
- 2002, The poor speak up : 17 stories of corruption
