= Australian Signals Directorate =

Australian signals intelligence agency

- Agency logo

- Program logo

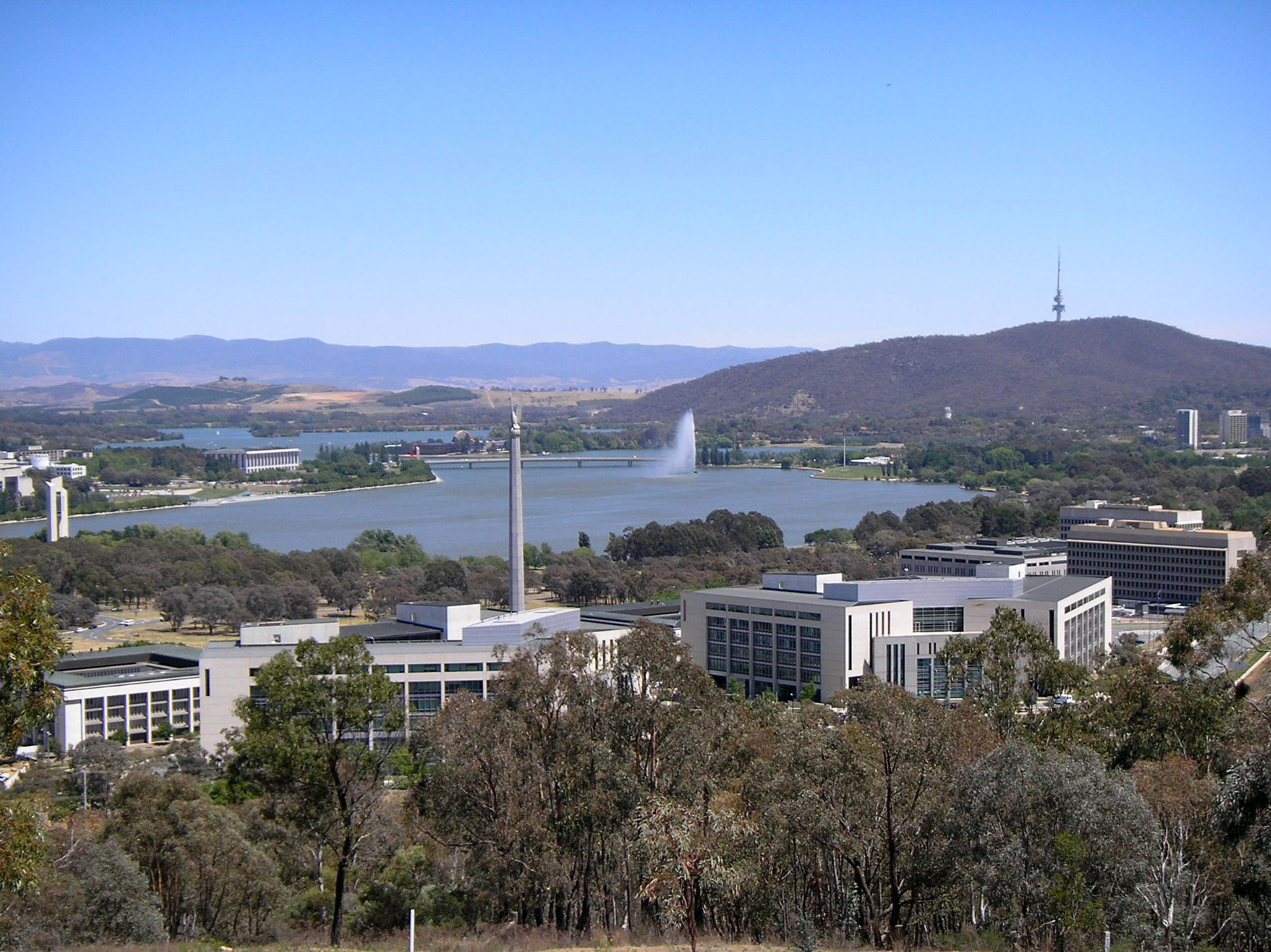
- The Russell Offices, Canberra in 2006

Agency overview
- Formed: 12 November 1947; 79 years ago
- Jurisdiction: Commonwealth of Australia
- Headquarters: Russell Offices, Canberra, Australia
- Motto: "Reveal their secrets, protect our own"
- Employees: Not published (2025–26)
- Annual budget: $2.48 billion (2025–26)
- Minister responsible: Richard Marles, Minister for Defence
- Agency executive: Abigail Bradshaw, Director-General
- Parent agency: Department of Defence
- Child agency: Australian Cyber Security Centre
- Website: www.asd.gov.au

The Australian Signals Directorate (ASD), formerly the Defence Signals Directorate, is a statutory agency of the Government of Australia responsible for signals intelligence, providing intelligence support to Australian military operations, conducting cyberwarfare and ensuring information security. The ASD is a part of the larger Australian Intelligence Community, and its role within the so-called Five Eyes intelligence-sharing alliance is to monitor signals intelligence in South and East Asia. The Australian Cyber Security Centre (ACSC) is an agency within the ASD.

The unit was established in 1947 by executive order as the Defence Signals Bureau within the Department of Defence, and underwent several name changes until its current name ASD was adopted in 2013. ASD was converted to a statutory body by the Intelligence Services Act 2001. ASD is based in Canberra, at the Defence Department Headquarters at Russell Offices. As of May 2026, Abigail Bradshaw is the Director-General of ASD, replacing Rachel Noble in September 2024.

In April 2018, a proposal to empower ASD to collect intelligence on Australians was backed by former Minister for Home Affairs Peter Dutton, but was strongly opposed by some in Cabinet who argued it was not necessary. Under legislation, the Australian Security Intelligence Organisation (ASIO) and the Australian Federal Police (AFP) are already allowed to seek assistance from ASD in conducting investigations on Australian citizens and businesses.

== History ==
The Directorate has operated under a number of different names since its founding:

- 1947 – Defence Signals Bureau established within the Department of Defence
- 1949 – name changed to Defence Signals Branch
- 1964 – name changed to Defence Signals Division
- 1977 – name changed to Defence Signals Directorate on recommendation of the Royal Commission on Intelligence and Security (Hope Commission)
- 2013 – name changed to Australian Signals Directorate

ASD commissioned an official history in 2019, which will cover the organisation's history from its establishment to 2001.

In the 2022–23 federal budget, the government announced REDSPICE, a $9.9 billion investment in ASD over ten years.

== Roles and responsibilities ==
The principal functions of ASD are to collect and disseminate foreign signals intelligence (SIGINT) and to provide information security products and services to the Australian Government and Australian Defence Force (ADF), its foreign partners and militaries.

ASD operates at least three receiving stations:

- the Australian Defence Satellite Communications Station (ADSCS), located at Kojarena, near Geraldton, Western Australia,
- the Shoal Bay Receiving Station, located at Shoal Bay, Northern Territory, and
- a small station on the Cocos (Keeling) Islands.

ASD also maintains a workforce at Pine Gap in central Australia.

ADSCS and Shoal Bay are part of the United States signals intelligence and ECHELON analysis network. These stations also contribute signals intelligence for many Australian Government bodies, as well as the other UKUSA partners.

Electronic warfare operators in the Royal Australian Corps of Signals work closely with ASD. 7 Signal Regiment (Electronic Warfare) at Borneo Barracks, Cabarlah, Queensland is also associated with ASD.

In addition, it has been reported that many Australian embassies and overseas missions also house small facilities which provide a flow of signals intelligence to ASD.

=== UKUSA Agreement (Five Eyes) ===
Australia joined the UKUSA Agreement in 1948, a multilateral agreement for cooperation in signals intelligence between Australia, Canada, New Zealand, the United Kingdom, and the United States. The alliance is also known as the Five Eyes. Other countries, known as "third parties", such as West Germany, the Philippines, and several Nordic countries also joined the UKUSA community. As the Agreement was a secret treaty, its existence was not even disclosed to the Australian Prime Minister until 1973, when Gough Whitlam insisted on seeing it. The existence of the UKUSA Agreement was discovered by the Australian government during the 1973 Murphy raids on the headquarters of the Australian Security Intelligence Organisation (ASIO). After learning about the agreement, Whitlam discovered that Pine Gap, a secret surveillance station close to Alice Springs, Australia, had been operated by the U.S. Central Intelligence Agency (CIA). Pine Gap is now operated jointly by both Australia and the United States.

The existence of the Agreement was not disclosed to the public until 2005. On 25 June 2010, for the first time, the full text of the agreement was publicly released by the United Kingdom and the United States, and can now be viewed online. Under the agreement, ASD's intelligence is shared with UKUSA signals intelligence partner agencies:

- the National Security Agency (NSA) – United States,
- the Government Communications Headquarters (GCHQ) – United Kingdom,
- the Communications Security Establishment (CSE) – Canada, and
- the Government Communications Security Bureau (GCSB) – New Zealand.

== Organisational structure ==
The Australian Signals Directorate is led by a Director-General and a Principal Deputy Director-General who oversee strategy. The ASD also comprises the Australian Cyber Security Centre, a Signals Intelligence and Network Operations Group, and a Corporate and Capability Group.

=== SIGINT and Network Operations Group ===
The Signals Intelligence and Network Operations Group is responsible for signals intelligence collection, analysis and production, and ASD's network based access and effects operations. The Group comprises an Intelligence Division and a Network Operations and Access Division responsible for foreign signals intelligence and offensive cyber operations.

=== Defence SIGINT and Cyber Command ===
The Defence Signals-Intelligence (SIGINT) and Cyber Command (DSCC) was established in January 2018 by the Chief of the Defence Force consolidating all ADF personnel within the ASD within the Joint Cyber Unit and Joint SIGINT Unit. The Commander of the DSCC is responsible to the Head of Information Warfare under the Chief of Joint Capabilities to the Chief of the Defence Force.

== Leadership ==
=== Director/Director-General ===
Name	Term began	Term ended
Teddy Poulden	1 April 1947	1949
R.N. Thompson	1949	1977
R.D. Botterill	1977	1982
Tim James	1982	1994
Martin Brady	1994	1999
Ron Bonighton	1999	2002
Stephen Merchant	2002	May 2007
Ian McKenzie	May 2007	November 2013
Paul Taloni	November 2013	3 December 2017
Mike Burgess	4 January 2018	15 September 2019
Rachel Noble	February 2020	September 2024
Abigail Bradshaw	September 2024	Incumbent

== See also ==
- Australian Intelligence Community
- List of intelligence agencies
- Espionage
- ECHELON
