= Project Waler =

1980–85 failed Australian defence procurement

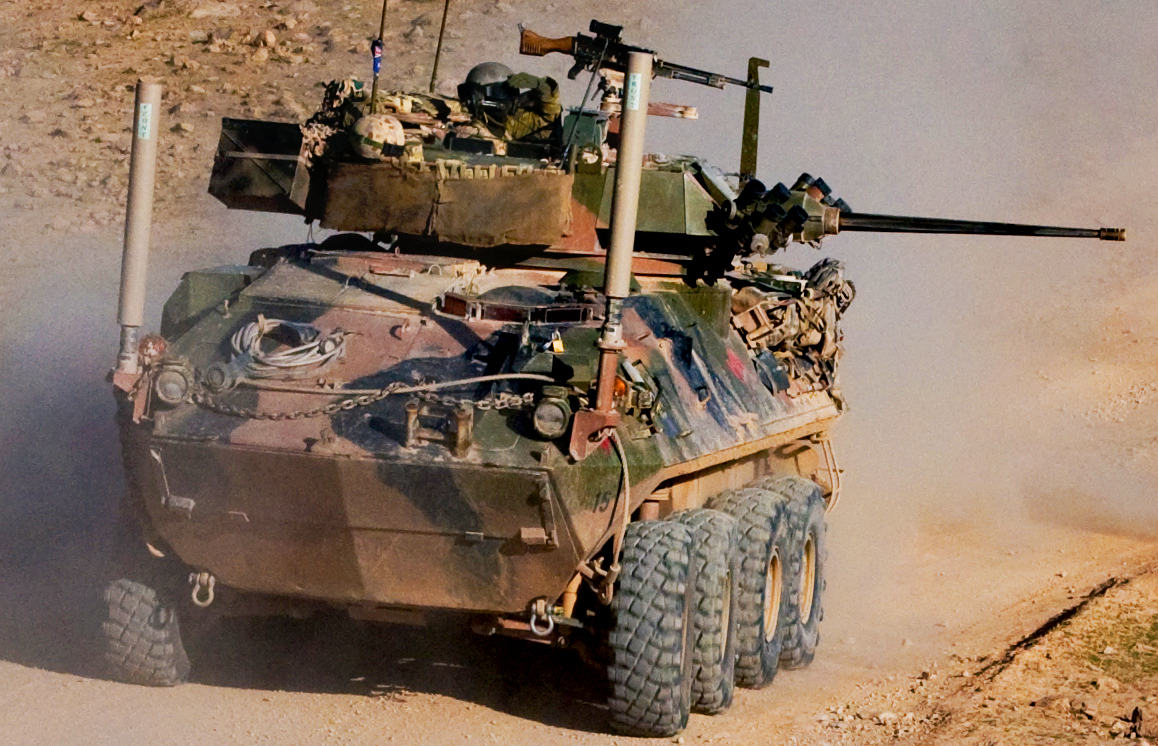
- An Australian Army ASLAV in 2011. These armoured fighting vehicles are similar to those considered during Project Waler and were acquired several years after it was cancelled.
- Type: Infantry fighting vehicle and other variants
- Place of origin: Australia

Production history
- Designed: 1980–1985 (scoping studies and initial design work only)
- No. built: Between 500 and 1,000 planned. None built.
- Drive: Tracked and wheeled designs considered

Project Waler was an unsuccessful Australian defence procurement project which sought to replace the Australian Army's M113 armoured personnel carriers with more capable armoured fighting vehicles (AFVs). It was initiated in 1980 and cancelled in 1985 without any vehicles being procured.

The goal of the project was to replace the Army's M113s during the mid-1990s with between 500 and 1,000 AFVs optimised for Australian conditions. These vehicles were to be built in Australia to support the local manufacturing industry. After initial scoping work, proposals were sought from companies during 1981. These proposals were submitted in 1982, and further studies were undertaken in 1983. While the scoping studies demonstrated that it would be feasible to build the vehicles in Australia, a planned tender to acquire them was not issued. Instead, Project Waler was cancelled by the Australian Government in July 1985 due to concerns over the cost and capabilities of the proposed vehicles. The M113s used by the Army's armoured reconnaissance units were replaced by ASLAV wheeled armoured fighting vehicles that were similar to the designs considered under Project Waler. Most of the remaining fleet of M113s were upgraded.

Project Waler is sometimes cited as an example of a mismanaged Australian defence procurement process, with commentators noting that it had been over-ambitious and not enough emphasis was placed on keeping costs down. The M113 upgrade project was also unsuccessful, with the resultant vehicles being unfit for combat, and the Australian Government launched a new project in 2018 to replace them.

== Background ==
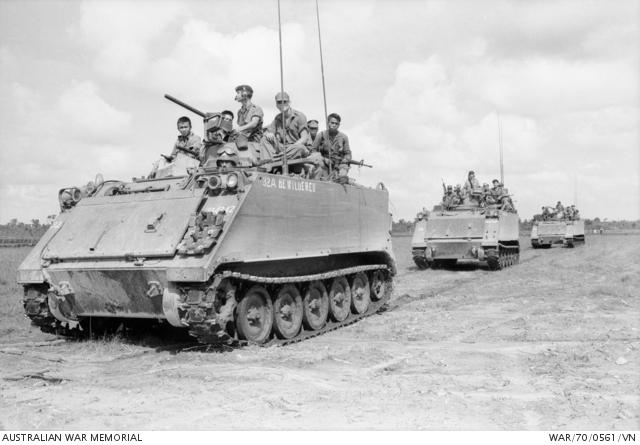
Three Australian M113s in South Vietnam during 1970

The Australian Government placed its first orders for M113s during the 1963–1964 financial year. At this time, it was planned to retain the type until 1995. The Australian Army began operating M113s in March 1965, and they were successfully used in combat during the Vietnam War. Multiple orders for M113s were placed, totalling either 817 or 840. These comprised nine variants tailored for different roles, with the majority being M113A1 armoured personnel carriers. Deliveries were completed in 1979. From 1970 the M113 was the standard vehicle for all of the Army's armoured units other than the 1st Armoured Regiment, which operated tanks.

During the late 1970s and early 1980s, the Australian Defence Force (ADF) was partially restructured in line with the Defence of Australia policy. This policy was focused on protecting continental Australia, and especially northern Australia, from attack and represented a move away from previous policies which had been based around expeditionary warfare. It also included an emphasis on self-reliance. However, force structure design was hampered by unclear strategic guidance and budget limitations. The Army began preparing for conventional warfare in Australia, but there was an institutional belief that an invasion was highly unlikely. The Liberal-Country party coalition Fraser government that was in power from 1975 to March 1983 and the Hawke government of the Australian Labor Party that succeeded it had similar defence policies during this period.

There were differences of opinion between the ADF and the civilian Department of Defence over the nature of the threats that should be used as a basis for force design. This arose from assessments that found that there was no imminent threat to the country's security. The department believed that the ADF should focus on preparing for low-intensity conflicts, and placed a low priority on the Army's armoured forces and artillery. This was not a monolithic view, and priorities for the defence budget varied between areas of the department. The Army and the other services (the Royal Australian Navy and the Royal Australian Air Force [RAAF]) judged that there was a need to prepare for medium-intensity combat and an expanded military if Australia's security situation worsened. In line with this view, the Army's leaders took advantage of the discord within the Department of Defence to pursue a force structure optimised for conventional warfare and rapid deployment overseas. The three services did not coordinate their force structure planning. This contributed to each adopting force structure goals that were unaffordable and had unrealistic elements.

== Project history ==
=== Goals ===
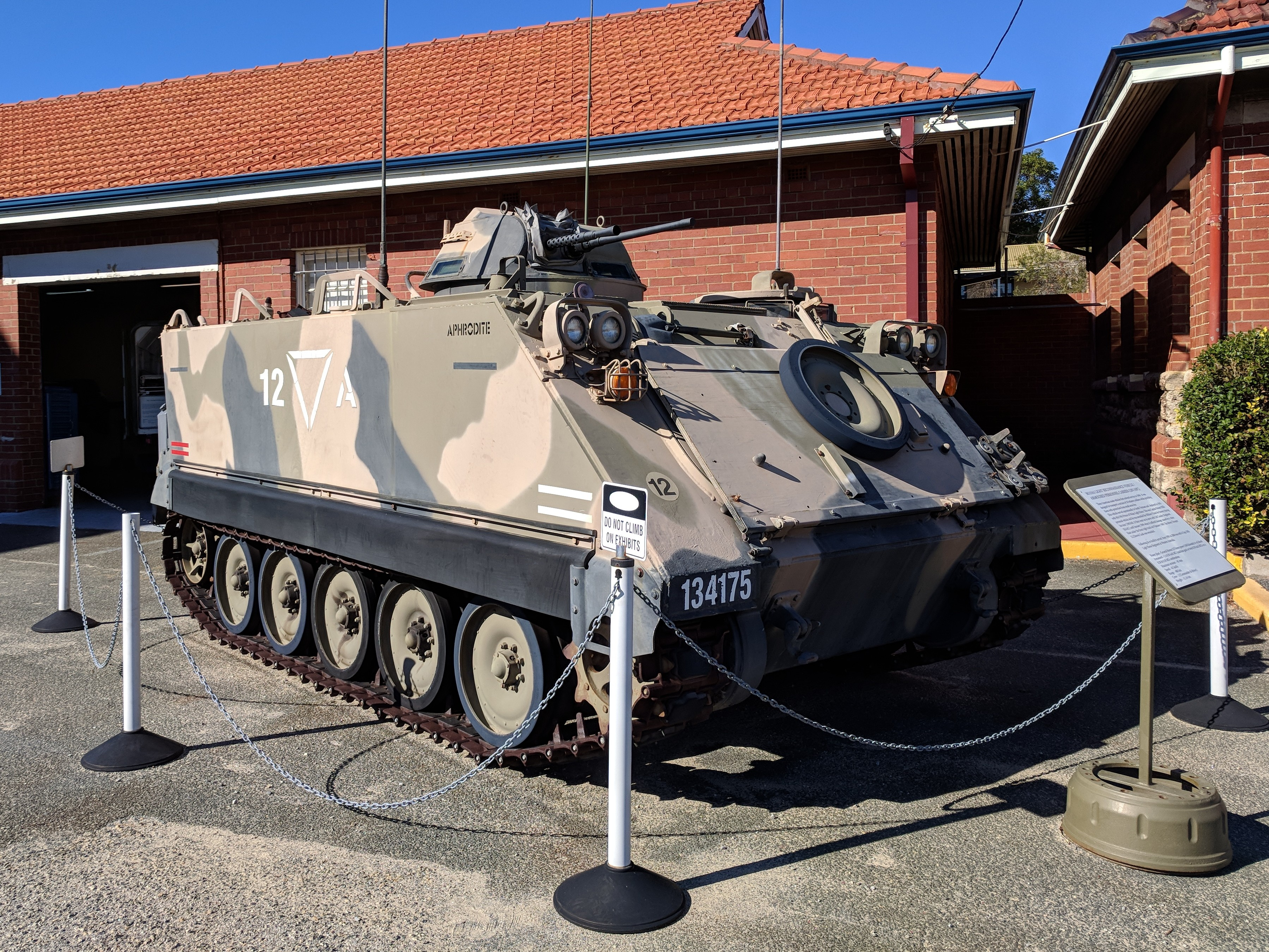
A retired Australian Army M113 on display at a museum. The vehicle is illustrative of the type's features during the 1980s.

The Army began considering acquiring Australian-built light armoured fighting vehicles (AFVs) to replace its M113s in 1973, but formal work to explore this option did not commence until 1980. Project Waler was authorised by Minister for Defence James Killen in April 1980. It aimed to replace the M113s with new light AFVs that were optimised for operations in Australia. The first of these vehicles were to enter service in the mid-1990s. The project was named after the Waler horses that had been used by Australian Light Horse units in the Middle East during World War I.

Following Killen's authorisation, the Army developed a staff target that formally documented the goals for the project. This was completed in October 1980. While the number of AFVs to be acquired was not specified at this time, in mid-1981 the project coordinator, Lieutenant Colonel Bernie Sullivan, stated that the eventual fleet would be between 500 and 1,000 AFVs. The Army was open to using wheeled or tracked armoured vehicles. They were to include variants optimised for transporting troops, reconnaissance, command and control, ambulance functions, repairing and recovering armoured vehicles, carrying radar and moving cargo. The Army also hoped to acquire a large training area in western New South Wales as part of Project Waler. This area would provide a mechanised brigade with opportunities to practise conventional warfare in open country. Sullivan described Project Waler as "the biggest and most ambitious armoured vehicle project ever attempted by the Australian Army". There was not universal support for Project Waler within the Army. Some elements of the service believed that acquiring new battlefield helicopters was a higher priority than replacing the M113s.

The government saw Project Waler as a significant opportunity for the Australian manufacturing industry to produce technologically advanced military equipment. Building the vehicles in Australia was also considered to be an important element of the government's "policy of increasing self-reliance in defence". Studies undertaken by the Department of Defence concluded that the Australian defence industry was capable of designing and producing the vehicles as long as some technologies were transferred from overseas. The Department of Defence's annual report for the 1981–1982 financial year stated that "as far as practical" the Project Waler vehicles "are to be designed, developed and made in Australia". Accordingly, the project included elements that encouraged Australian industry involvement, including through the government supporting the development of necessary industrial capabilities while the vehicles were still being scoped. Due to its strategic importance, Project Waler was also identified in 1983 as a procurement exercise where the government was willing to pay a premium for manufacturing the vehicles in Australia rather than importing them. In December 1981 Killen argued in favour of continued trade protections for the Australian automotive industry. This reflected the Department of Defence's view that the industry was necessary on security grounds and could play a role in Project Waler.

It was hoped that Project Waler vehicles could be sold for export. Project Waler was identified in the early 1980s as being one of three major defence procurement exercises where Australia and New Zealand could collaborate. The New Zealand Army discussed joining the project with the Australian Government as a means of replacing its own fleet of M113s.

=== Feasibility studies ===
Exploratory studies undertaken by the Department of Defence at the outset of Project Waler broadly identified the characteristics considered desirable for the AFVs. The Government then launched what was intended to be a four-phase process to develop and produce the vehicles. The first phase was to be a feasibility study. The second phase would involve first developing a detailed project definition and then selecting an AFV through a competitive process. As part of the third phase the winning company was to finalise the design. The type would then be produced as the fourth phase. At this time the Australian defence procurement process was very complex, with projects being required to pass through fourteen steps between an initial feasibility study and final approval. These steps involved several committees and working parties and required the defence industry to submit very detailed proposals that were costly to prepare. It typically took at least five years for procurements to be approved, by which time the military's requirements had often changed.

The first phase of Project Waler began in September 1981. The Department of Defence sought proposals that needed to cover how the vehicles could be built and maintained in Australia and the estimated costs of doing so. The lead contractor for each proposal was required to be an Australian firm, but they could partner with foreign companies.

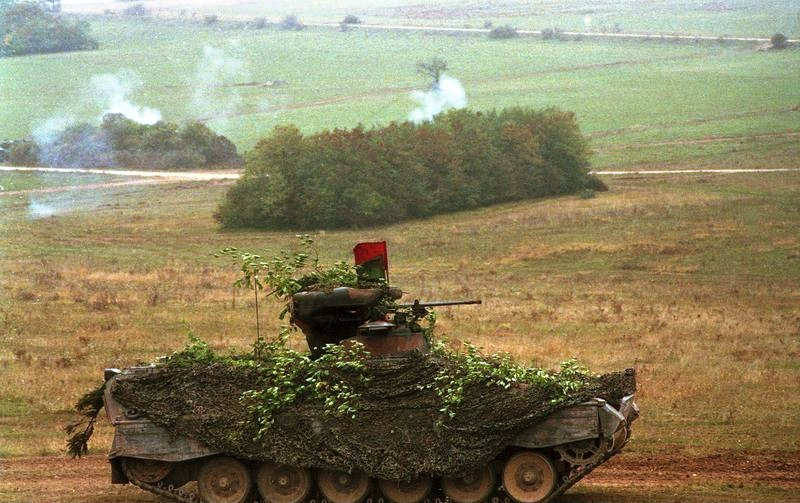
A German Marder infantry fighting vehicle in 1986; this design was similar to the Army's requirements for Project Waler

A total of 14 companies submitted proposals by the deadline in February 1982. The Sun-Herald reported that a company that had considered submitting a proposal had asked the Japanese embassy in Canberra for the invasion plans drawn up by the Japanese military during World War II to use as the basis of a scenario that the AFVs could counter. The Japanese defence attaché rejected this request but complimented the company for its enterprise. Three proposals were selected in July 1982 for further consideration. These were the proposals submitted by the Australian branch of EASAMS which was teamed with EASAMS and Vickers Defence Systems of the United Kingdom, Evans Deakin Industries which had partnered with the French firms SOFMA and GIAT, and Goninan which was teamed with the American FMC Corporation.

The three companies were funded by the Department of Defence to conduct further studies to "provide the Army with information upon which to base realistic vehicle requirements" and identify the feasible extent of Australian content in the vehicles. The studies also investigated whether the vehicles should be tracked or wheeled, and what engines and armament should be fitted. Each company was required to submit four designs for infantry fighting vehicles (IFVs), including tracked and wheeled vehicles. The Army did not set specifications for the vehicles at this stage, as it wanted to encourage the companies to propose solutions which met its requirements. The Bulletin noted that this was a good example of the approach the military was taking at the time to involve the defence industry in procurement processes.

After each company submitted four designs the Army selected two of them and asked that they be further developed. In doing so the Army favoured the designs which fully met its requirements, even though they would be the most expensive to produce. The development work involved the companies providing outline designs for other variants, as well as information on the expected costs and how the vehicles could be built in Australia. At this time a tender for formal proposals to design and build the new vehicles was to be issued as the next stage of the project.

The studies were completed in early 1983. In December that year the Minister for Defence, Gordon Scholes, announced that the studies confirmed that it would be feasible to build the vehicles in Australia. It was expected that, subject to further approvals by the government, tenders for the project definition phase of the process would be advertised in August 1984. This phase of the project was expected to cost $25 million. By mid-1984 the date for the project definition phase had been pushed back, and it was now scheduled to take place between 1986 and 1988. It was intended to select two firms to undertake this work, leading to a single lead contractor being selected. This firm was to then conduct further development work between 1989 and 1995. Production of the vehicles was to begin during the 1996–1997 financial year.

Project Waler was expected to be expensive, and the estimated costs increased over time. In 1981 it was expected that acquiring 700 vehicles would cost $500 million. By 1984 the cost of designing and then building 650 vehicles was estimated to be $638 million. The Sydney Morning Herald reported in 1985 that manufacturing the Project Waler vehicles in Australia was now expected to cost $800 million. The Age stated in the same year that the project as a whole could cost up to $1 billion. The vehicles would be more expensive than comparable designs produced overseas as Australian industry would not be able to achieve economies of scale due to the relatively small number to be procured.

Other work related to Project Waler was conducted separately from the feasibility studies. The Department of Defence Support assisted the Australian defence industry to establish the capacities needed to produce the advanced optical instruments that the new armoured vehicles would require. The Department of Defence's Materials Research Laboratories also conducted metallurgical research on vehicle armour that was to be applied to the new AFVs. A terrain analysis study of north western Australia was undertaken using geographic information system software to identify the most important environmental factors to be considered when designing the vehicles.

=== Cancellation ===
Increasing demands on the defence budget during the mid-1980s contributed to a reassessment of Project Waler, as the military needed to focus funds on its highest priorities. In February 1985 The Canberra Times reported that the government was considering ending the program as a cost-savings measure. This story also stated that the government was attracted to a proposal from the United States that the M113s be upgraded instead of replaced, with such a modification program providing opportunities for the Australian defence industry. In response to this story, the federal opposition's defence spokesman Ian Sinclair issued a statement arguing that cancelling Project Waler would be "yet another nail in the defence coffin" as the Army needed new armoured vehicles and building them would create employment in manufacturing industries.

The Department of Defence recommended to the government in May 1985 that Project Waler be deferred by five years. This was based on an assessment by the department that the Army's plans to obtain a large number of armoured vehicles were ill-founded. The Sydney Morning Herald reported that Minister for Defence Kim Beazley shared this view, as he believed that the Army needed to become more mobile by using vehicles that were easier to transport between locations. The newspaper also stated that a five-year deferral was likely to lead to the project being cancelled.

The government decided to cancel Project Waler on 24 July 1985, and directed the Army to prepare new plans for recapitalising its fleet of transport vehicles that were focused on increasing its mobility rather than its armoured protection or firepower. In doing so, the Army was asked to explore the feasibility of using wheeled rather than tracked AFVs as well as lightly armed and armoured off-road vehicles. It was believed that such vehicles would be well suited to conditions in northern Australia, which required AFVs capable of travelling long distances independently rather than heavy tracked vehicles which needed to be moved by tank transporter trucks. The Army was also told to develop options to upgrade the M113s. Beazley stated at this time that while the designs under consideration for Project Waler were superior to the M113, they would be very costly to procure. He also noted that the cost of the project had doubled in real terms since it began. Following Project Waler's cancellation the partnerships between Australian and foreign firms which had been established to prepare proposals were dissolved.

The Canberra Times reported that it had proven difficult to tailor the Project Waler designs to Australian conditions, and that the government regarded them as unsuited to Australia's needs. The defence industry analyst Stanley S. Schaetzel has suggested that the Army may have not been fully committed to the project and had greatly underestimated its cost, and was surprised by the cost estimates in the scoping studies. Schaetzel has also noted that the Army became interested in upgrading rather than replacing the M113s when the United States Army began an M113 upgrade project in the early 1980s.

The federal opposition criticised the decision to cancel Project Waler, which had been initiated while it was in office. Sinclair argued that the M113s needed to be replaced as they were obsolete and in poor repair. During a parliamentary question time session in May 1986, Beazley stated that the requirements which had been set for the Project Waler vehicles were unsuitable given Australia's needs. He gave as examples the expected weight of the vehicles' armour preventing them from being carried by the RAAF's C-130 Hercules transport aircraft and the project documents requiring that they have the capacity "to keep going for a period of one hour after a nuclear attack on the battlefield with a loss of half its crew".

== Aftermath ==
=== M113 upgrades and alternatives ===
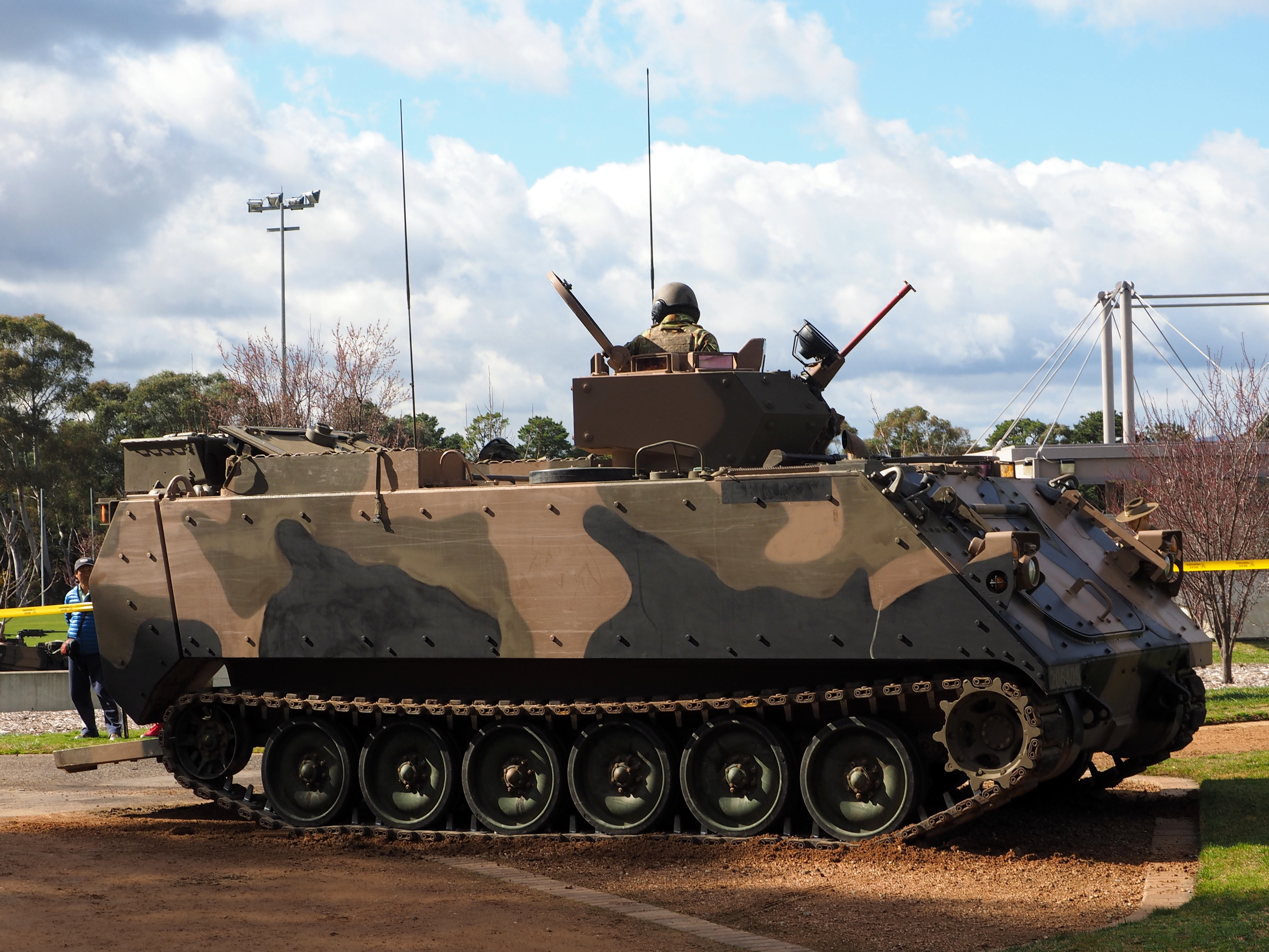
An upgraded Australian Army M113 in 2015

The Dibb Report, a review commissioned by Beazley of Australia's defence policy that was published in March 1986, recommended that the Army consider acquiring new AFVs suited to conditions in northern Australia. It argued that there was not an urgent need for them though, and they should be acquired only after the Army had amassed further experience of operating M113s and other types of vehicles in this region. The report stated that the eventual new vehicles "should be able to be easily transported to the area of operations, including by whatever strategic transport aircraft would then be in operation, and that its basic attributes would be a high degree of tactical mobility, modest but adequate fire-power, and protection against small arms, mortars and mines". During the preparation of the report the Army informed its author Paul Dibb that the Project Waler vehicles would have met these criteria. Dibb stated in the report that other military and civilian experts had disagreed with this view, including by noting that it would have been difficult to transport the Waler vehicles by air. He was also critical of the plans to acquire a large training area in New South Wales that had formed part of Project Waler. Dibb believed that this was not necessary, as the Army should be focused on preparing small units for the tropical conditions in northern Australia.

The 1987 Defence White Paper, which was influenced by the Dibb Report, included commitments to upgrade some of the M113s and purchase "faster, more mobile wheeled light armoured fighting vehicles, carrying weapons and surveillance equipment suitable for northern contingencies". The new vehicles were to replace the 2nd Cavalry Regiment's M113s as part of a project that would also see this unit transferred to Darwin, Northern Territory. The Canberra Times noted that the vehicles would be similar to those that had been considered under Project Waler. The ASLAV was selected in 1991 and phased into service during 1995 and 1996. The basic vehicles were built in Canada, then shipped to Adelaide in South Australia where British Aerospace undertook final fitting out before they were issued to the Army. A total of 257 were acquired, with the type proving very successful in service. The Australian National Audit Office judged that the process through which the ASLAVs were purchased was generally well managed.

Planning for the M113 upgrade project began in the early 1990s. As part of the development of a business case for the upgrade following 2000, consideration was given to replacing the M113s with IFVs such as the American M2 Bradley. It was decided to not procure IFVs at this time as they were considered too expensive and difficult to deploy by air. The development work proved to be protracted, and the first upgraded M113s were accepted by the Australian Army in November 2007. Deliveries were completed in September 2012. All of the upgrade work was undertaken in Australia by the company Tenix. Some of the metallurgical research undertaken as part of Project Waler was drawn on for the upgrades to the M113s' armour. By the time the M113 upgrade project was complete, the vehicles were no longer suitable for combat. This was because they did not provide adequate protection against heavy machine guns, most forms of modern anti-tank missiles, mines and large improvised explosive devices. The shortcomings of the upgraded M113s left the Army with a significant capability gap that required a replacement project to be launched.

=== Subsequent IFV project ===
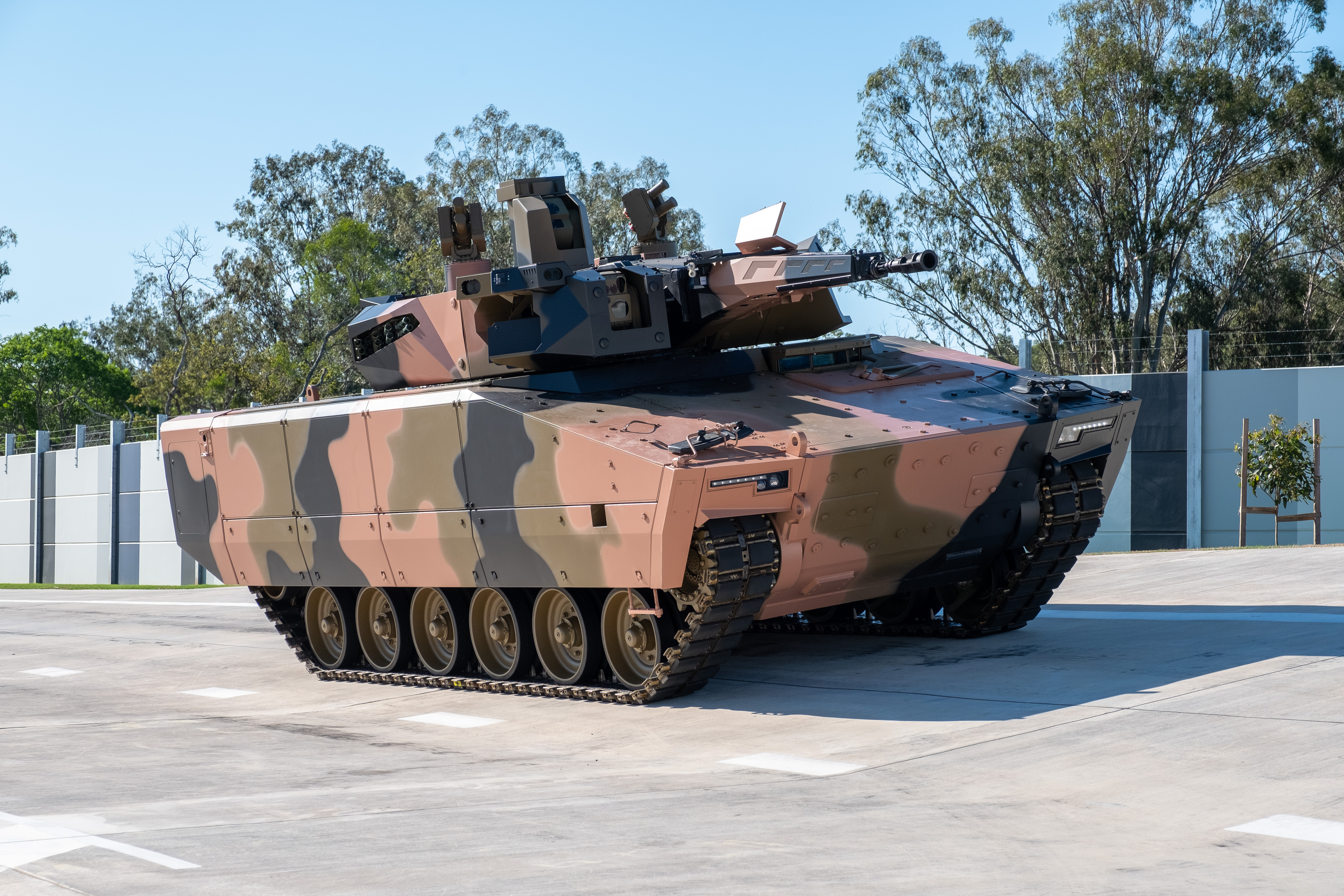
A Rheinmetall Lynx, one of the two IFV designs being considered to replace the M113s as of 2022

In 2018, tenders were sought for IFVs to replace the M113s. The Australian Government initially planned to acquire up to 450 of these vehicles, with the majority being built in Australia. The IFVs are expected to be much heavier, better armed and more strongly protected than the M113s.

The number of IFVs to be purchased was cut to 300 in mid-2022 to reduce the program's cost, which is expected to be the most expensive ever undertaken for the Army. A decision on the type of IFV to be purchased was originally scheduled for 2022, but was delayed until 2023 to align with the Defence Strategic Review that was completed in March that year. The ABC reported in October 2022 that there was speculation that the project may be cancelled due to its cost. In April 2023 the government decided to reduce the number of IFVs to 129 to free up funding for other defence priorities. This will be sufficient to equip a single mechanised battalion. It was announced in July 2023 that the AS21 Redback had been selected, with deliveries to begin in 2027. These IFVs will be built in Australia.

== Assessments ==
Project Waler is sometimes cited as an example of the mismanagement of Australian defence procurement. A December 1985 editorial in The Sydney Morning Herald judged that Beazley was correct to cancel it as the Army's objectives were over-ambitious and producing the vehicles in Australia rather than buying them from overseas would have led to wasteful spending. Schaetzel argued in 1986 that Project Waler was, like the Australian light destroyer project, an example of the Australian Defence Organisation initiating an over-ambitious and speculative project that ended in a "fiasco". He also stated that the failure of these projects may have discouraged firms from submitting bids for subsequent Defence procurement exercises given the costs involved in preparing proposals. Schaetzel expanded on this argument in 1989, noting that the three large scale attempts to develop defence equipment in Australia between the 1970s and mid 1980s (Project Waler, the light destroyers and the AAC Wamira training aircraft) failed after "considerable expenditure had been incurred" due to deficient planning and project management. He recommended that the defence procurement process be streamlined and that a forum be established to assess the overall benefits of defence procurements for the military and Australian industry rather than just their benefits for the service that was to use the equipment.

In 1990 Lieutenant Colonel Gregory C. Camp, a US Army officer who had served on exchange with the Australian Army, argued that the leaders of Project Waler "fell prey to a desire to incorporate more and more into the equipment". Camp noted that the contemporary US Army project to develop the Armored Gun System and the Fast Attack Vehicle had experienced similar problems, with the planned vehicles also becoming unaffordable. The Canberra Times's defence correspondent Frank Cranston wrote in 1991 that upgrading the M113s instead of purchasing the vehicles intended under Project Waler would not meet the Army's needs for large numbers of highly mobile AFVs. He argued that "the locally designed Waler project was killed as much by over-specification as by government misunderstanding". In a 1998 PhD thesis, John-Silvano Bruni observed that Project Waler was one of several failed attempts to design and produce advanced military equipment in Australia during the 1970s and early 1980s, and the performance of the defence industry didn't improve until the mid-1980s when the sector was reformed and the government improved its procurement processes. These reforms led to several more successful projects in which complex military equipment was produced in Australia.

More recently, the Australian Defence Magazine noted in 2011 that Project Waler was one of several Australian military vehicle procurement exercises that experienced problems due to "poor (and always, it seems, interminably slow) requirements development and poor project management" as well as under-performance by the Australian defence industry. Australian Strategic Policy Institute analyst Ben Coleman observed in 2018 that Project Waler "proved to be an overreach for its time; the expected financial and political costs didn’t seem commensurate with the strategic benefit".
