= Paul Dibb =

Australian academic and defence analyst (born 1939)

Paul Dibb AM
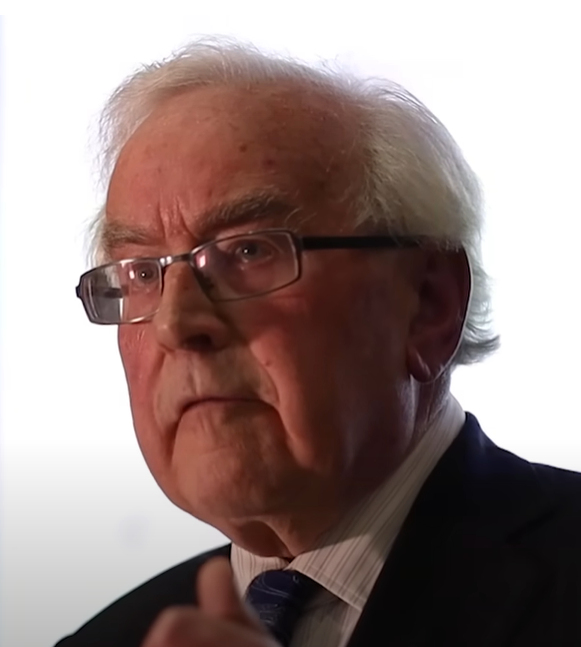
- Professor Paul Dibb on Aug 3, 2022. Conference "Why did Russia attack Ukraine and what are its geopolitical implications?", at the Australian National University.

Director of the Strategic and Defence Studies Centre
- In office 1991–2003
- Preceded by: Desmond Ball
- Succeeded by: Hugh White

Deputy Secretary for Strategy and Intelligence
- In office 1988–1991
- Preceded by: J. M. Moten
- Succeeded by: Allan Hawke

Director of the Joint Intelligence Organisation
- In office 1986–1988
- Preceded by: G. R. Marshall
- Succeeded by: Major General John Baker

Personal details
- Born: 3 October 1939 (age 87) Fryston, West Yorkshire, England
- Spouse: Rhondda Nicholas
- Education: University of Nottingham; Australian National University
- Known for: Author of Dibb Report; The Soviet Union: The Incomplete Superpower

Paul Dibb AM (born 3 October 1939) is an English-born Australian strategist, academic and former defence intelligence official. He is currently emeritus professor of strategic studies at the Strategic and Defence Studies Centre that is part of the Australian National University.

He was the head of the National Assessments Staff (the predecessor to the Office of National Assessments) from 1974 to 1978, the director of the Joint Intelligence Organisation (the predecessor to the Defence Intelligence Organisation) from 1986 to 1988, and the head of the Defence Strategy and Intelligence Group with the rank of Deputy Secretary in the Department of Defence from 1988 to 1991. Dibb is also known for his contribution to Australian defence strategy through writing the 1986 Review of Australia’s defence capabilities, known as the Dibb Report, and being the primary author of the 1987 Defence White Paper. From 1965 to 1984, Dibb worked for the Australian Security Intelligence Organisation, tasked with gaining intelligence and recruiting KGB and GRU agents in Canberra.

== Early life and education ==
Dibb was born on 3 October 1939 in Fryston, a coal mining village in Castleford, West Yorkshire, England to mother Ethel, maid to a local solicitor, and father Cyril, a trolley-bus driver. He attended the King's School in Pontefract. He was awarded a County Exhibition Scholarship to undertake a Bachelor of Arts in economics and geography at the University of Nottingham. He graduated with honours in 1960.

After graduation, Dibb worked as an apprentice manager at a chrome component factory for motor vehicles. Against the advice of the Careers and Appointments Board of Nottingham University, he applied to the British Civil Service. His advisers had warned that he was unlikely to succeed because he did not attend a prestigious school like Eton or Harrow, and Cambridge or Oxford. He was rejected likely due to classist attitudes about his working-class background.

He applied to join the Australian Public Service and was offered a job as a research officer on the UK desk of the then Australian Department of Trade. He moved to Canberra in 1961. In 1965, Dibb joined the Bureau of Agricultural Economics to research the Soviet wheat industry economy. Dibb then briefly worked on independence negotiations for Nauru as the personal assistant to the Secretary of the Department of Territories in 1967. In 1968, he joined the Australian National University Research School of Social Sciences working as a research fellow in Soviet affairs until joining the Joint Intelligence Organisation in 1970.

In 1986, Dibb received his Doctorate of Philosophy from the Australian National University with the thesis The Soviet Union: The Incomplete Superpower, which examined Soviet power and critiqued the mainstream opinion that the Soviet Union was a superpower. Dibb's thesis was critically acclaimed.

== Intelligence career ==
Dibb joined the Australian Intelligence Community in 1970 as an analyst in the Directorate of Economic Intelligence of the Joint Intelligence Organisation. He moved to the National Assessments Staff (the predecessor to the Office of National Assessments) supporting the then National Intelligence Committee (the predecessor to the National Intelligence Coordination Committee) in 1972 and became director-general of the National Assessments Staff in 1974 serving until 1978. He served as a deputy director of the Joint Intelligence Organisation from 1978 to 1980. In 1980 he was appointed the Senior Assistant Secretary of Strategic Policy within the Department of Defence.

In 1986, Dibb was given charge of the Joint Intelligence Organisation (the predecessor to the Defence Intelligence Organisation) and served until 1988. From 1988 to 1991, he served as the Deputy Secretary for Strategy and Intelligence with responsibilities for the Joint Intelligence Organisation and its transformation into the Defence Intelligence Organisation and the then Defence Signals Directorate and Defence Imagery and Geospatial Organisation. In 1991, Dibb was honoured by the United States National Reconnaissance Office for his work in US–Australian space collaboration, relating to his work overseeing the Joint Defence Facility at Pine Gap and supporting the National Reconnaissance Office–Central Intelligence Agency Program B. Dibb was made a Member of the Order of Australia in 1989 for his contribution to defence policy, strategy and intelligence.

== ASIO agent ==
In parallel with his academic and public service careers, Dibb worked for the Australian Security Intelligence Organisation (ASIO) to gather counterintelligence on the Soviet Union capabilities in Australia for over 20 years from 1965 to 1984. In 1965, Dibb was recruited by the deputy director-general of the ASIO, Ron Richards, who had run the Petrov defection in 1954. Dibb was charged with developing relationships with Soviet diplomats in Canberra, gathering intelligence about KGB and GRU capabilities in Australia, and investigating Soviet views on the Australian-United States alliance and the Joint Defence Facility at Pine Gap. Dibb also sounded out the potential of Soviet agents to defect to the West or to work as informants to the Australian Intelligence Community.

Confidential documents show that in 1977, the Central Intelligence Agency believed Dibb was a more valuable informant for the CIA on the Soviets in Canberra than was ASIO itself. However, ASIO grew suspicious of Dibb because of his White Russian wife and closeness with his contacts in the Soviet Embassy, including the Canberra KGB Station Chief Lev Koshlyakov who had taken Dibb and Dibb's wife dancing in Moscow in 1984. An ASIO briefing note marked "secret" written in October 1984 by ASIO Director-General Harvey Barnett about Dibb and released under FOI confirms that ASIO investigated Dibb on security grounds. Nonetheless, Dibb was cleared and exonerated and he continued his intelligence career in the Department of Defence.

== Dibb Report ==
From 1985 to 1986, Dibb was a ministerial consultant to Defence Minister Kim Beazley, a member of the Hawke government. During this time, he formulated a review of Australia's defence capabilities known as the Dibb Report. According to journalist Geoffrey Barker, it was "his most important public and personal contribution to defence policy."

== Academic career ==
In 1981, Dibb briefly left the Australian Public Service to work as a senior research fellow in the Department of International Relations at the Australian National University and then became an administrator of the Strategic and Defence Studies Centre in 1984 until joining the Minister for Defence as a ministerial consultant in 1985.

In 1991, Dibb retired from the Australian Public Service and became the director of the Strategic and Defence Studies Centre, part of the Australian National University until 2003–where he is currently the emeritus professor. During the Government of Prime Minister John Howard, Dibb was a member of the Foreign Minister's Foreign Policy Advisory Council.

== Notable publications ==
- (2006) The Bear Is Back
- (2016) Why Russia is a threat to the international order
- (2019) How the geopolitical partnership between China and Russia threatens the West
- (2022) Putin’s Perspective on Ukraine
- (2022) Geopolitical implications of Ukraine invasion

== Personal life ==
Dibb is married to Rhondda Nicholas, his third wife. He has a daughter and a son.

== Published works ==
- Australian Bureau of Agricultural Economics (1966). The economics of the Soviet wheat industry: an economic study of the structure, trends, and problems of the wheat industry in the U.S.S.R. from 1953 to 1965 with a perspective to 1970. Australian Bureau of Agricultural Economics.
- Blackwill, Robert D.; Dibb, Paul (2000). America's Asian Alliances. MIT Press. ISBN 9780262522854.
- Dibb, Paul (1972). Siberia and the Pacific: a study of economic development and trade prospects. Praeger Publishers. ISBN 9780275286170.
- — (1986a). The Soviet Union: The Incomplete Superpower. University of Illinois Press. ISBN 9780252012600.
- — (1986b). Review of Australia's defence capabilities: report to the Minister for Defence. Australian Government Publishing Service. ISBN 9780644049238.
- — (1988). The Soviet Union: The Incomplete Superpower. Springer. ISBN 9781349193493.
- — (1995). Towards a New Balance of Power in Asia. Vol. 35. The International Institute for Strategic Studies. ISBN 978-0198280699.
- — (1997). "The revolution in military affairs and Asian security". Survival. 39 (4) (published 1 December 1997): 93–116. doi:10.1080/00396339708442946. ISSN 0039-6338.
- — (2002). "The future of international coalitions: How useful? How manageable?". The Washington Quarterly. 25 (2) (published 1 June 2002): 129–144. doi:10.1162/01636600252820180. ISSN 0163-660X. S2CID 153469580.
- — (2005). Essays on Australian Defence. Canberra: Strategic and Defence Studies Centre.
- — (2006). America and the Asia-Pacific Region. Sydney: Allen & Unwin.
- — (2014). The Geopolitical Implications of Russia's Invasion of the Ukraine. Canberra: Strategic and Defence Studies Centre.
- — (2016). Why Russia is a Threat to the International Order. Canberra: Australian Strategic Policy Institute.

== Secondary sources ==
- Ball, Desmond; Lee, Sheryn (2016). Geography, Power, Strategy and Defence Policy: Essays in Honour of Paul Dibb (PDF). ANU Press. ISBN 9781760460143. Archived (PDF) from the original on 9 January 2017.
- Ball, Desmond; Robinson, Bill; Tanter, Richard (2016). Australia's participation in the Pine Gap enterprise (PDF). Nautilus Institute. Archived (PDF) from the original on 21 December 2016.
- Dennis, Peter (2008). The Oxford Companion to Australian Military History. Oxford University Press. ISBN 9780195517842.

Government offices
Preceded by G. R. Marshall	Director of the Joint Intelligence Organisation; 1986–1988	Succeeded by Major General John Baker
Preceded by J. M. Moten	Deputy Secretary for Strategy and Intelligence; 1988–1991	Succeeded by Allan Hawke
Academic offices
Preceded by Desmond Ball	Head of the Strategic and Defence Studies Centre of the Australian National University; 1991–2003	Succeeded by Hugh White
