= Peter Barbour =

Australian diplomat

3rd Director-General of Security
- In office 22 January 1970 – 28 September 1975
- Prime Minister: John Gorton; William McMahon; Gough Whitlam
- Preceded by: Sir Charles Spry
- Succeeded by: Frank Mahony

Personal details
- Born: 5 October 1925 Geelong, Victoria, Australia
- Died: 7 November 1996 (aged 71) Stirling, Australian Capital Territory, Australia
- Spouse: Penelope Elizabeth Nuttall (m. 1951)
- Education: University of Melbourne
- Occupation: Intelligence officer

Military service
- Allegiance: Australia
- Branch/service: Australian Army
- Years of service: 1944–1946
- Rank: Sergeant

Peter Robert Woolnough Barbour (5 October 1925 – 7 November 1996) was an Australian intelligence officer and diplomat. He was also the Director-General of Security leading the Australian Security Intelligence Organisation (ASIO) from 1970 to 1975.

== Early life ==
Barbour was born in Geelong, Victoria into a family of educators. He was schooled at Scotch College, Adelaide and Geelong Church of England Grammar School. His father was warden of the University of Melbourne Union, and Barbour commenced in residence at Trinity College, Melbourne in 1947, while undertaking studies in Latin and German at the University of Melbourne before joining the Australian Army during World War II. Following his army service, he returned to Melbourne University to study a Master of Arts in German, but was recruited into ASIO in April 1951 before he completed the degree.

== Intelligence and diplomatic career ==
Barbour's early work at ASIO saw him posted to the Netherlands and Italy as an immigration official, to prevent Communists migrating to Australia. In 1959, he was posted to ASIO's Canberra office as head of counterespionage. His role in entrapping the Soviet diplomat and KGB agent Ivan Skripov gave a boost to his career, and he became head of the Canberra office in 1964, Deputy Director-General in 1965 and in 1970 was promoted to Director-General. Barbour is the only Director-General of ASIO to have been appointed from within the organisation.

At the time of Barbour's appointment, ASIO was seen by many Australians as politically compromised, and had been passing information to the Menzies government regarding suspected Communists and Soviet agents associated with the Australian Labor Party. The day after the election of Labor's Gough Whitlam as Prime Minister in 1972, Whitlam's soon-to-be appointed Attorney-General Lionel Murphy (ASIO's responsible minister), met with Barbour to inform him in no uncertain terms that the agency's days of autonomy and lack of ministerial and parliamentary oversight were over. The ensuing strained relationship between the Whitlam government and ASIO culminated when Murphy raided its Melbourne headquarters on 15 March 1973. Barbour was dismissed by Whitlam on the 17 September 1975. the Whitlam government announced that Barbour was to be posted to the United States as Australian Consul-General in New York. In 1978, he took a consular role in Los Angeles, and from 1981 to 1984 he was appointed Australia's Ambassador to Venezuela.

The reasons for Barbour's sudden dismissal by Whitlam were never officially explained. Confidential documents released by the National Archives in 2008 revealed that Barbour's dismissal was by bipartisan agreement between Whitlam and Opposition Leader Malcolm Fraser, and had been recommended by Justice Robert Hope as part of the Hope Royal Commission into the intelligence services. In a record written by Barbour he said that Whitlam pointed that "morale in the Organisation [ASIO] was poor and that there were unsatisfactory administrative aspects", Whitlam also pointed to Barbour's relationship with his secretary "who had accompanied [him] on a recent overseas trip". Barbour's successor, Edward Woodward, wrote in his memoirs that Barbour's sacking had followed a lengthy overseas trip with his "beautiful Eurasian secretary" to ostensibly review overseas intelligence agencies, but for which Barbour had failed to produce any reports, suggestions or information of benefit to the agency.

== Personal life ==
Barbour married Penelope Elizabeth Nuttall on 10 March 1951 at the Trinity College Chapel.

Government offices
Preceded by Sir Charles Spry	Director-General of Security; 1970–1975	Succeeded by Frank Mahony
Diplomatic posts
Preceded by Sir John Wilton	Australian Consul-General in New York; 1975–1978	Succeeded by Bob Cotton
Vacant Title last held by Harold Marshall	Australian Consul-General in Los Angeles; 1978–1981	Succeeded by John McLeay
Preceded by Alan Brown	Australian Ambassador to Venezuela; 1981–1984	Succeeded by Richard Starr
