= Alan Wrigley =

Australian writer and public servant (1931–2022)

Alan Wrigley AO

7th Director-General of Security
- In office 29 July 1985 – 7 October 1988
- Prime Minister: Bob Hawke
- Preceded by: Harvey Barnett
- Succeeded by: John Moten

Personal details
- Born: 19 July 1931 Launceston, Tasmania, Australia
- Died: 25 July 2022 (aged 91)
- Education: RMIT University; Royal College of Defence Studies
- Occupation: Writer, public servant
- Profession: Engineer

Alan Keveral Cumming Newton Wrigley AO (19 July 1931 – 25 July 2022) was an Australian writer and commentator on topics related to intelligence, defence and security. Prior to his writing career, he was an engineer at the Government Aircraft Factories, a senior public servant in the Department of Defence, and Director-General of Security (the head of the intelligence agency ASIO).

== Early life and military service ==
Born on 19 July 1931 in Launceston, Tasmania, Wrigley joined the Government Aircraft Factories in Melbourne as a cadet engineer in 1950, and later became an aeronautical engineer. In 1975, he joined the Department of Defence as an Assistant Secretary, was promoted to First Assistant Secretary in 1981, and Deputy Secretary under Bill Pritchett in 1982.

== Director-General of Security ==
On 29 July 1985, Wrigley was appointed as Director-General of ASIO. As Director-General, Wrigley implemented several rigorous reforms to the agency, continuing a trend begun under the directorship of Sir Edward Woodward by further reducing the level of specialisation and increasing generalisation. He also oversaw the moving of ASIO's headquarters from Melbourne to Canberra in 1986. A number of experienced officers resigned from ASIO after Wrigley abolished benefits and allowances for senior officers moving to Canberra, which had been negotiated with the Hawke government under his predecessor Harvey Barnett.

== After ASIO ==
Wrigley's term as Director-General was to expire at the end of July 1988 but he was appointed, without discussion, to another three-year term by Bob Hawke's cabinet — although the Canberra Times speculated he would not see out the term as he was rumoured to be considering another position with the Department of Industry, Technology and Commerce. Indeed, Wrigley resigned from ASIO on 7 October 1988 to act as a special advisor to the Minister for Industry, Technology and Commerce (Senator John Button) on the planned Multifunction Polis project until 31 December 1990.

In 1990, Wrigley authored a report for the Department of Defence entitled The Defence Force and the Community: A Partnership in Australia's Defence (also known as "The Wrigley Report"), which resulted in the creation of the Commercial Support Program and ultimately saw the market testing and transfer of around 10,000 uniformed and civilian positions in Defence to the private sector.

== Death ==
Wrigley died on 25 July 2022, at the age of 91.

Government offices
Preceded by Harvey Barnett	Director-General of Security; 1985–1988	Succeeded by John Moten
