= Daria Impiombato =

Australian analyst

- Occupations: Analyst, writer

Daria Impiombato is an Australian analyst at the Australian Strategic Policy Institute. Her expertise is on technology, human rights, new media, and foreign policy, with a focus on China. She has written extensively about the digital and new media tools the Chinese state used to censor human rights violations.
