= Des Ball =

Desmond Ball AO

Personal details
- Education: Australian National University
- Known for: Author of A suitable piece of real estate: American installations in Australia

Desmond John Ball AO (20 May 1947 – 12 October 2016) was an Australian academic and expert on defence and security. He was credited with successfully advising the United States against nuclear escalation in the 1970s.

== Background ==
Des Ball attended the Australian National University in 1965, shifting from being a promising student in economics to security studies. He completed a PhD supervised by Hedley Bull, on the global nuclear strategies of the United States and the Soviet Union. He was based for several months in the USA at the Institute of War and Peace. He joined ANU as a lecturer in 1974, becoming head of the Strategic and Defence Studies Centre in the ANU College of Asia and the Pacific from 1984 to 1991, and Special Professor in the centre in 1987.

Ball was an opponent of the draft for the Vietnam War in Australia (although not the war itself, at the time), and was arrested for protesting against it. He won an appeal in the Supreme Court against his conviction. From 1966 he was a "person of interest" for ASIO, particularly following his inquiries into the Pine Gap secret tracking facility and Nurrungar in Australia from 1969, and was taken to court after the publication of A Suitable Piece of Real Estate in 1980. He held ASIO in disdain, for its inability to recognise that aspects of defence co-operation with the US infringed Australian national interests by remaining entirely secret.

Ball was diagnosed with incurable cancer and died on 12 October 2016 at the age of 69. Despite his illness, he continued writing and working until his death.

== Contributions ==
Ball was a political realist, and a believer in liberal institutions and solid defence strategies. He used an inductive, investigative approach to security studies.

During the Cold War, Ball was invited to critique US nuclear defence plans—his analysis persuaded the US that its plan to destroy selected Soviet targets in a limited strike would not work in practice and would lead to all-out nuclear escalation. His analysis was acknowledged by President Jimmy Carter.

Ball worked on Australia's signal intelligence and exposed Australia's secret history of cracking diplomatic cables. In 1998, with David Horner he confirmed wartime Soviet spying in Australia revealed by the Petrov Affair, carried out by staff in Evatt's Foreign Affairs Department.

He studied, and was active in, some of Southeast Asia's "shadow wars". He was a supporter of Karen independence, having discovered the extent of Burmese Army human rights abuses, and advised the Karen National Liberation Army along the Thai/Myanmar border on successful guerrilla warfare from the early-2000s. He made over 85 research trips to the region.

He worked with the Council for Security Cooperation in the Asia Pacific, and believed the biggest threat in the early 21st century would be the potential for conflict escalation in north-east Asia.

== Awards ==
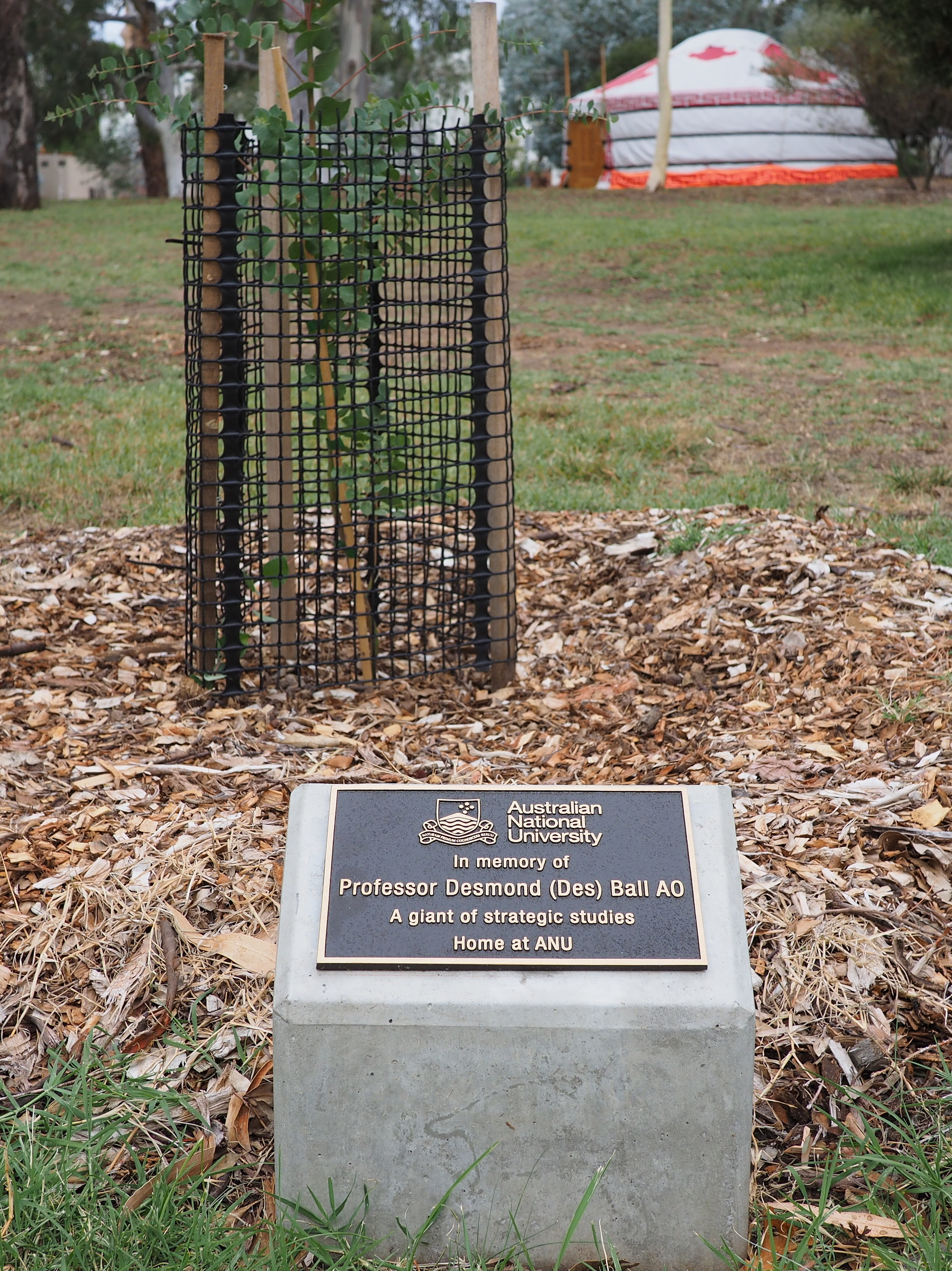
A tree planted to commemorate Des Ball near the HC Coombs Building at the Australian National University

- Peter Baume Award, ANU (2013)
- Officer of the Order of Australia (2014)
- Festschrift volume, Brendan Taylor, Nicholas Farrelly and Sheryn Lee (eds.) 2012. Insurgent Intellectual: Essays in Honour of Professor Desmond Ball. Institute of South East Asian Studies. Including a contribution by Jimmy Carter.
- Ball Strategic Endowment ($AU 1.5m) established in 2013 for ANU research scholarship into Australian and Asian strategic studies and defence.
- Co-chairman of the Steering Committee of the Council for Security Cooperation in the Asia Pacific (CSCAP) (2000–2002).
- Fellow of the Academy of the Social Sciences in Australia (1986).

== See also ==
- Mass surveillance in Australia
