= Hugh White (strategist) =

Australian defence analyst (born 1953)

Professor Hugh White AO FASSA
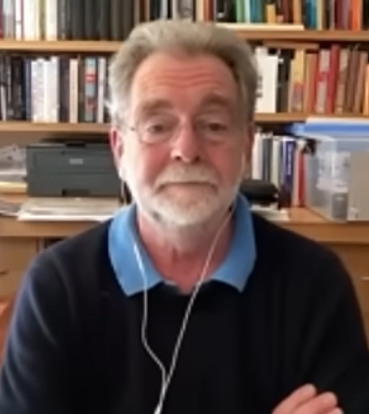
- White in 2025
- Born: 1953 (age 72–73); Australia
- Occupations: Government official; strategist; academic; journalist
- Known for: Australian defence policy; Australia-US-China relations

Academic background
- Education: University of Oxford; University of Melbourne

Academic work
- Institutions: Australian National University

Hugh White AO FASSA (born 1953) is an emeritus professor of strategic studies at the Strategic and Defence Studies Centre of the Australian National University in Canberra, a longtime defence and intelligence analyst, and author who has published works on military strategy and international relations. He was the international relations advisor to Australian Defence Minister Kim Beazley and PM Bob Hawke between 1985 and 1991, Deputy Secretary for Strategy and Intelligence in the Australian Department of Defence from 1995 to 2000, and the first director of the Australian Strategic Policy Institute with tenure from 2001 to 2004. He was the head of the Strategic and Defence Studies Centre from 2004 to 2011. His 2019 book, How to Defend Australia, attracted national attention after raising the proposition of an independently nuclear-armed Australia. He also has been a longtime contributor to the Australian politics think tank Lowy Institute since 2013.

== Education and early career (1970s–2000) ==
White studied philosophy at the University of Melbourne and the University of Oxford in the 1970s. At Oxford, he took the Bachelor of Philosophy, and he was awarded the John Locke Prize in Mental Philosophy in 1978. In the 1980s, he was variously a journalist for the Sydney Morning Herald, an intelligence analyst at the Office of National Assessments, an advisor to Minister for Defence Kim Beazley, and the international advisor to Prime Minister Bob Hawke. In 1995, he was appointed deputy secretary for strategy and intelligence in the Australian Department of Defence. During his tenure, he was involved in the preparation of the 2000 Defence White Paper, entitled "Our Future Defence Forces", published by the Howard government. Its central conclusions were that Australia must maintain a self-reliant defence force, retain control of its maritime territories, and "seek to attack hostile forces as far from our shores as possible". He has since described himself as the white paper's "principal author".

== Academic career (2000–present) ==
In the early 2010s, White gained significant coverage in the Australian media, with regular commentary in The Australian, the Sydney Morning Herald, and numerous television appearances. Much of his intellectual work has been presented in articles written for The Strategist since 2012.

In 2010, he published The China Choice: Why We Should Share Power. The book gained national attention as well as favourable commentary globally, including from the New York Times, the Financial Times, and the New York Review of Books. The book details the changing relationship between the US and China as one seeks to overtake the other in asserting power over Asia. As for Australia, White has claimed that its strategic hedging could not last and that policymakers would one day have to choose to become aligned with either the US or China.

For more than a century, [the US] has contributed to peace and order, to economic development, to political evolution, and to science, technology and art around the world – and all these contributions have been nothing short of exceptional.

In 2012, Crikey's Power Index of influential thinkers in Australia ranked White at number seven.

In July 2010, two weeks after the Australian federal elections, White expressed criticism of the Rudd government's escalation of Australian involvement in the War in Afghanistan, which he argued resulted in increased casualties. White advocated for a reconsideration of the Abbott government's preference for a deal with Japan for the construction of Australia's next-generation submarine fleet. The basis for his belief was the negative implications on Australia-China relations, and he instead advocated for deals with France or Germany.

In 2014, White stated that Australia is a key player in the Asian region but that Australian governments routinely believe Chinese governments are preoccupied with economic interests when China is determined to redistribute regional power in its favour.

Australia seems to have acquired quite a prominent place in regional power politics, as shown by the way Obama, Xi, Modi and Abe have all come here to deliver big geopolitical speeches. It would be unwise to believe that the Chinese do not care about Australia's position on Asia's great strategic questions.

In April 2017, he criticized America's policy toward North Korea under Donald Trump, which made it ineffective in deterring the repressive regime from building ICBMs with the ability to strike the US mainland.

In 2025, White criticized Australian Prime Minister Anthony Albanese for his policy of appeasement toward the second Trump administration.

== Criticism ==
White has most often been criticised for his bullish outlook in defence matters, especially in relation to armaments. A strategist at the University of New South Wales at the Australian Defence Force Academy, James Goldrick, argued in 2015 that White's bellicosity must be measured against the price of war, stating that "[w]hat we have to be sure [about] is that the end justifies the means".

Other commentators have argued that White exaggerates the threat posed by China in the Asian region. Paul Dibb from the Australian National University claims that White has overstated the ability of China to assert its power.

== Awards and recognition ==
White was made an Officer of the Order of Australia in the 2014 Queen's Birthday Honours for "distinguished service to international affairs, through strategic defence studies as an analyst, academic and adviser to government, and to public administration".

In 2020, he was elected a fellow of the Academy of the Social Sciences in Australia.

== Bibliography ==
Articles

- "Choosing War". Res Publica. 12 (1). Melbourne: 1–5. 2003.
- "A Focused Force: Australia's Defence Priorities in the Asian Century". Lowy Institute. 26. April 2009.
- "Power Shift : Australia's Future Between Washington and Beijing". Quarterly Essay. 39. August 2010.
- "The Idea of National Security: What use is it to policymakers?" National Security College Occasional Paper. 3. April 2012.
- "Without America: Australia in the New Asia", Quarterly Essay No 68, Black: Collingwood, Victoria. 2017.
- "Without America". Response to Correspondence. Quarterly Essay. 69: 130–137. March 2018.
- "Sleepwalk to War: Australia's Unthinking Alliance with America", Quarterly Essay No 86, Black: Collingwood, Victoria. 2022.
- "Hard New World: Our Post-American Future", Quarterly Essay No 98, Black: Collingwood, Victoria. 2025.

Books

- Beyond the Defence of Australia: Finding a New Balance in Australian Strategic Policy. Sydney: Longueville Media. 2006.
- The China Choice: Why America Should Share Power, Black, Melbourne, Australia. 2012.
- How to Defend Australia, La Trobe University Press, Melbourne. 2019.
