= Frank Mahony (public servant) =

Australia lawyer and public servant

Frank Mahony CB, OBE

4th Director-General of Security
- In office 29 September 1975 – 8 March 1976
- Prime Minister: Gough Whitlam; Malcolm Fraser
- Preceded by: Peter Barbour
- Succeeded by: Edward Woodward

Personal details
- Born: Francis Joseph Mahony; 15 March 1915 Newcastle, New South Wales, Australia
- Died: January 2000 (aged 84) Sydney, New South Wales, Australia
- Spouse: Moya Sexton (m. 1939–1995)
- Education: University of Sydney
- Occupation: Public servant
- Profession: Lawyer

Military service
- Allegiance: Australia
- Branch/service: Australian Army
- Years of service: 1943–1944
- Rank: Staff sergeant

Francis Joseph Mahony CB, OBE (15 March 1915 – January 2000) was an Australian lawyer and public servant, who served as interim Director-General of Security (head of the Australian Security Intelligence Organisation) for just over five months between 1975 and 1976.

== Early life ==
Mahony was born in Newcastle in 1915, but was orphaned when his mother died the day after his birth and his father was killed in action at the Battle of Passchendaele in Belgium during World War I. He was raised by relatives in Newcastle where he went to school, until he moved to Armidale to attend De La Salle College, where he won a scholarship to the University of Sydney.

== Public service career ==
In 1934, Mahony joined the Commonwealth Public Service, whilst also studying law part-time at the Sydney Law School, from which he graduated in 1940. He joined the Crown Solicitor's Office in 1941, interrupting his public service career in 1943 to serve for eighteen months in the Australian Army. After discharge from the army, he returned to the CSO where he was involved in several high-profile inquiries and commissions including the Royal Commission into the Petrov Affair, an inquiry into the crash of Ansett-ANA Flight 325, and the Royal Commission into the Melbourne–Voyager collision. In 1963, he became Deputy Crown Solicitor.

In 1970, Mahony moved to Canberra to join the office of the federal Attorney-General. He was involved in the administration of legislation and law reform, and represented Australia on the delegation to negotiate improvements to the Geneva Convention on the treatment of prisoners of war.

Following the dismissal of Peter Barbour as Director-General of Security by the Whitlam government, Mahony was appointed as an interim replacement for Barbour for a brief five-month term until the appointment of Edward Woodward.

From 1979, Mahony was the first president of the Repatriation Review Tribunal until it became the Veterans' Review Board in 1985.

== Personal life ==
Mahony married Moya Sexton in 1936. They had eight children—seven sons and one daughter. Moya died in 1995.

== Honours ==
Mahony was made an Officer of the Order of the British Empire (OBE) in 1972 for his work as Deputy Secretary of the Attorney-General's Department. In the 1980 New Year Honours, he was made a Companion of the Order of the Bath (CB) for his role as President of the Repatriation Commission.

Government offices
Preceded by Peter Barbour	Director-General of Security; 1975–1976	Succeeded by Edward Woodward
