= John Moten =

Australian aeronautical engineer (1933–2022)

8th Director-General of Security
- In office 8 October 1988 – 10 January 1992
- Prime Minister: Bob Hawke; Paul Keating
- Preceded by: Alan Wrigley
- Succeeded by: David Sadleir

Personal details
- Born: John Michael Moten; 8 December 1933 Adelaide, South Australia
- Died: 9 July 2022 (aged 88) Canberra, ACT
- Relations: Murray Moten (father)
- Education: University of Adelaide; University of Sydney
- Occupation: Aeronautical engineer

John Michael Moten (8 December 1933 – 9 July 2022) was an Australian aeronautical engineer.

From 1988 to 1992, he was the Director-General of Security, the head of the Australian Security Intelligence Organisation (ASIO). He was the son of Brigadier Murray Moten, a senior Australian Army officer.

Moten was not a career intelligence officer. He had worked at the Department of Defence, where he was Deputy Secretary of the Strategic and Intelligence Section when he accepted the position of ASIO's Director-General. He retired in January 1992, three years into his five-year term. The reasons for his early retirement were never given.

He died on 9 July 2022, aged 94.

Government offices
Preceded by Alan Wrigley	Director-General of Security; 1988–1992	Succeeded by David Sadleir
