= 1973 Murphy raids =

Terrorism-related operation in Australia

Coordinates: 37°50′29.1″S 144°58′42.7″E

The Murphy raids on the offices of the Australian Security Intelligence Organisation (ASIO) occurred on 16 March 1973. The purpose of the raids, instigated by Attorney-General Lionel Murphy, was to obtain information about Croatian terrorism in Australia that the ASIO was accused of withholding. Murphy was operating without any permission from the Prime Minister at the time, Gough Whitlam or the Cabinet. No warrants were obtained from the judiciary.

A surprise raid was carried out on the Canberra office of ASIO and the investigation of ASIO's headquarters in Melbourne was done hours after the ASIO Director-General had been informed of Murphy's intentions.

== Background ==
=== Global terrorism and Australia ===
The Whitlam government came to office shortly after the terrorist attack at the 1972 Summer Olympics and the Sydney bombings involving Croatian separatist groups in Australia. One of the first acts of the new government was to help US-led efforts in the United Nations General Assembly to counter the rise of 'political violence' to person and property around the globe. These efforts failed because the Non-aligned Movement states believed that political violence or terrorism was not inherently illegitimate, given resistance and revolutionary activities in the former colonies.

A planned visit by Džemal Bijedić, the Yugoslavian Prime Minister, in March 1973 generated considerable concern within the government about the safety of the visiting dignitary. Murphy had been told that ASIO was withholding information about Croatian terrorism in Australia and that there was a plan to assassinate Bijedić during his visit.

There was also much concern in Yugoslavia, which was a member of the Non-Aligned Movement. The President of Yugoslavia Josip Tito said before the visit: "We will send more agents to Australia. We will crush these people [Croatian separatists]. We will destroy them root and branch". This indicated the possible presence of Yugoslavian secret service spies operating in Australia.

Labor and the Whitlam government were highly suspicious of ASIO and perceived the organisation to be a partisan tool of the Liberal governments in the 1950s and 1960s. At the 1971 Federal Labor Party conference, only a single vote (22 in favour, 23 against) had defeated a proposed motion "that ASIO be abolished".

=== The raids ===
Murphy, with the help of his advisor Kerry Milte—a former Commonwealth Police official and barrister—gained entry to the Canberra office of ASIO, which was then a regional office, at midnight on 16 March. They located a document which implied that ASIO and "the departments of Foreign Affairs, Attorney-General's and Immigration" had conspired to withhold information from him about Croatian separatists in Australia. Murphy wanted to fly immediately to the ASIO headquarters in Melbourne but was delayed at Canberra Airport for several hours.

The Director-General of Security (head of ASIO) Peter Barbour was informed of Murphy's intentions at 5:20 am and arrived at the Melbourne headquarters of ASIO at 6:45 am. 27 Commonwealth Police officers in plain clothes arrived "with orders to seal all file containers" at 7:40 am in order to "preserve and ascertain certain information". Murphy arrived at 9:45 am and instructed three officers with "special acquaintance with matters of Croatian terrorism" to assist him while the other officers waited outside. Murphy was given a sledge hammer which he used to break the front door.

It was initially reported that ASIO's switchboard had been disabled or interfered with, however the government later denied these reports. Various files were inspected by Murphy and his staff – without the police – until 12:40 pm, when the inspecting party left. They replaced original documents but took "Photostat" copies with them. However, no evidence of conspiracy was found. Later on the 16th, Murphy explained that the reason for the raids had been the safety of the visiting Yugoslavian Prime Minister.

According to Murphy the press had been alerted to the investigation of ASIO's headquarters by George Negus, who was then Murphy's press secretary. Footage was obtained of Murphy arriving at the building surrounded by plain clothed police officers.

== Responses ==
=== Immediate reaction ===
Politically, the raids on ASIO are said to have ended the new government's 'honey-moon' period by throwing its competency into question. The raid also improved ASIO's image as it was shown that ASIO was not engaged in conspiracy. It also damaged the bilateral relationship between the United States and Australia because of the intelligence exchange between the two states.

The Yugoslavian Prime Minister arrived in Australia five days after the raids. At around the same time the Prime Minister's office was fitted with bulletproofed glass and the pregnant wife of Attorney-General Lionel Murphy, Ingrid, went into hiding after a series of death threats. At a reception for the visiting Prime Minister held at The Lodge, Whitlam said:

It has taken regrettably long for the Commonwealth police force and ASIO to adjust themselves from such momentous activities as the pursuit of draft dodgers and Vietnam demonstrators to the new situation where we ought to provide our interest in terrorist activities in our midst.

Murphy had indicated on 1 March that he was going to make a statement on the issue of terrorism in Australia. However, the raids delayed this until 27 March. In the Australian Senate he explained that the Whitlam government saw political violence against persons and property as an illegitimate form of political expression the state has a right to pursue. The speech did not substantiate the raids nor did it discuss ASIO in depth. It was "a statement on terrorism and a political attack on the previous government" the same "conclusion reached by the United States, which had followed parliamentary debates and press coverage closely".

In Parliament, Whitlam and Murphy said that ASIO has made no official complaint about the raids. Under legal oath, before a Senate Committee erected by the hostile Senate to uncover more information about the raids, the Director-General said no complaint has been made. In August this was contradicted by a leaked letter revealing that the Director-General had made a complaint. This lie eroded the press' view of ASIO. In an interview with David Frost, Whitlam said "The greatest mistake the Government has made has been to take the police into ASIO headquarters".

James Jesus Angleton, the CIA's head of counter-intelligence at the time, was concerned by the raids. According to journalist Brian Toohey, Angleton sought to instigate the removal of Whitlam from office in 1974 by having CIA station chief in Canberra, John Walker, ask Peter Barbour, then head of ASIO, to make a false declaration that Whitlam had lied about the raid in Parliament. Barbour refused to make the statement.

=== Longterm consequences ===
The Murphy raids meant that the Whitlam government could not instigate the changes it wanted in ASIO in the short term. By September 1973 Whitlam indicated that an inquiry was likely to be commissioned. Labor took the policy of an inquiry to the election in 1974 and, after the controversy surrounding ASIO's leaked views on Deputy Prime Minister Jim Cairns, the Royal Commission on Intelligence and Security was launched. This would result in a lasting bipartisan consensus on ASIO.
