= David Sadleir =

Australian business consultant and former diplomat

David Sadleir AO

9th Director-General of Security
- In office 27 April 1992 – 10 October 1996
- Prime Minister: Paul Keating; John Howard
- Preceded by: John Moten
- Succeeded by: Dennis Richardson

Personal details
- Born: David Marshall Sadleir; 20 February 1936 (age 90) Dehradun, British India
- Education: University of Western Australia
- Occupation: Diplomat, intelligence director, consultant

David Marshall Sadleir AO (born 20 February 1936) is an Australian business consultant and former diplomat and ambassador, who was Director-General of Security (head of the intelligence agency ASIO) from 1992 to 1996.

== Early life ==
Sadleir was born in Dehradun, British India. He settled in Australia in 1949, and attended Scotch College, Perth and the University of Western Australia where he graduated with a Bachelor of Arts with Honours.

== Diplomatic and intelligence career ==
Sadleir joined the Australian Department of External Affairs in 1958. He was an advisor to the Australian delegations to the Inter-Parliamentary Union, and was posted in Tokyo and Washington DC as Assistant Secretary of the department's North Asia branch. From 1977 to 1981, he was Deputy Director-General of the Office of National Assessments, an intelligence agency reporting to the Prime Minister of Australia, under Director-General Robert Furlonger. He was a Permanent Representative to the United Nations and other international organisations in Geneva from 1981 to 1984.

In 1988, Sadleir was Australian Ambassador to China for a three-year term until 1991, when he became Australian Ambassador to Belgium/Luxembourg and the European Communities.

In 1992, Sadleir was appointed Director-General of Security, the head of the Australian Security Intelligence Organisation.

== Consultancy career ==
Since leaving ASIO in October 1996, Sadleir founded a business and security consultancy company called David Sadleir and Associates.

In 1998, he conducted a review of Australia's entry control arrangements, in particular the Movement Alert List (MAL).

== Honours ==
Sadleir was made an Officer of the Order of Australia (AO) in the 1991 Australia Day Honours, for services to international relations.

Diplomatic posts
Preceded by Ross Garnaut	Australian Ambassador to China; 1988–1991	Succeeded by Michael Lightowler
Preceded by Peter Curtis	Australian Ambassador to Belgium; 1991–1992	Succeeded by Ted Pocock
Government offices
Preceded by John Moten	Director-General of Security; 1992–1996	Succeeded by Dennis Richardson
