= Strategic and Defence Studies Centre =

Australian think tank

The Strategic and Defence Studies Centre (SDSC) is a university-based institute that is situated in the Coral Bell School of Asia Pacific Affairs at the Australian National University. It is Australia's oldest-established centre for the study of strategic, defence and wider security issues and a leading regional think tank on these topics. The centre was established in 1966 by Professor T.B. Millar, then a senior fellow at the ANU's Department of International Relations, in order to "advance the study of Australian, regional, and global strategic and defence issues". The current head of SDSC is Brendan Taylor. Previous Heads include Emeritus Professor Paul Dibb and Professor Hugh White, who both also served as the Deputy Secretary for Strategy and Intelligence of the Department of Defence.

== Focus ==
The key priorities of the SDSC are to work on national public debate on strategic, defence and security issues [...], foster regional dialogue and interactions on security questions [...], publish scholarly research [and] deliver teaching to many backgrounds.

== Work ==
To do so, the SDSC publishes the peer-reviewed Canberra Papers on Strategy and Defence as well as the SDSC Working Papers. Additionally, it attracts highly regarded speakers (both from academia and the defence community) in its seminar and conference program. It awards high-performing PhD students with the Sir Arthur Tange PhD Scholarships in Strategic & Defence Policy (named in honour of the former Australian Secretary of Defence) and outstanding postgraduate students with the T.B. Millar Scholarship.

The SDSC staff gives frequent lectures and seminars for other departments within the ANU and other universities, as well as to various government departments. The centre has also assisted Australia's major defence training institution, the Australian Defence College, with the strategic studies sections of its courses. Members of the Centre provide advice and training courses in strategic affairs to the Australian Department of Defence and the Australian Department of Foreign Affairs and Trade. The SDSC, furthermore, delivers the Graduate Studies in Strategy and Defence Program and is host of the Boeing Library.

The staff of the SDSC has established professional links with other Australian and overseas universities and centres specialising in strategic and security issues as the Centre aims to foster an enhanced pattern of liaison through the exchange of ideas, personal contacts and, where appropriate, joint projects. The scholars at the SDSC do also provide expert commentary on important defence issues to the Australian and overseas media.

== Notable faculty ==
Current staff include Hugh White, Paul Dibb, Joan Beaumont, Chris Barrie (former Chief of the Defence Force), Daniel Marston, David Horner, and Garth Pratten.

The SDSC is part of the Council for security cooperation in the asia pacific, a nongovernmental process for second track dialogue on security and defence issues in Asia Pacific.

== Boeing Library ==
The Boeing Library is a library based at the Strategic and Defence Studies Centre. The library started in the 1960s and served as a small reading room for the staff of the SDSC, which was then a research centre only. With the assistance of an annual grant by Boeing Australia the library expanded in the late 1980s to include an extensive range of books and journals on defence policy and planning, military studies and regional security issues.

The Boeing Library is important to the academic and research staff at the centre as well as at the ANU. Its holdings cover the following fields: Australian defence policy and planning, military studies, classical theorists on the causes and conduct of war, the laws of armed conflict, ethics and nuclear issues (like proliferation and arms control). The library keeps important collections on the United Nations and peacekeeping, and the politics, society and foreign and defence policies of the countries in the Asia-Pacific. It continues to subscribe to major strategic and defence journals which are not part of the main University library collection.

So far, the Boeing Library is not a borrowing library, but is open to the public for 'in-house' use during weekdays.
