= John Story (businessman) =

Australian businessman

John Douglas Story AO, an Australian businessman, was previously a chairman and/or director of a number of Australian listed corporations.

Story is the grandson of John Douglas Story, a prominent Queensland public servant.

== Career ==
After a career as a lawyer, predominantly with law firm Corrs Chambers Westgarth, Story took on a number of directorships. Story's directorships have included:

- Echo Entertainment Group (2011–2012). In June 2012, chairman of rival Crown Resorts, James Packer, put pressure on the Echo board to remove Story. Despite Story wanting a shareholder vote on his continuation, he agreed to resign
- CSR (2003–2012)
- Suncorp (1995 – 2011, chairman 2003 – 2011)
- Tabcorp (2004 – 2011, chairman 2007 – 2011)
- Magontec (2001–2005)

John Story was the 13th Chancellor of The University of Queensland from 2009 until 2016. He was preceded by Llew Edwards and succeeded by Peter Varghese. John Story's grandfather, John D. Story was the Vice-Chancellor of The University of Queensland from 1938 to 1960.
