= Thomas Millar =

Australian academic

Thomas Bruce Millar AO (18 October 1925 – 5 June 1994), also known as T. B. Millar, was an Australian historian, political scientist and a major figure in the development of strategic studies in Australia.

Millar was born in Kalamunda, Western Australia. He was educated at Guildford Grammar School in Perth and the Universities of Western Australia, Melbourne and London. He was a graduate of the Royal Military College, Duntroon, and served in the Australian Army in 1943–1950.

After several years as a schoolteacher, he joined the staff of the Department of International Relations at the Australian National University in 1962. He was a professorial fellow in the department from 1968 onwards and head of the Strategic and Defence Studies Centre (SDSC) in 1966–1971 and 1982–1984. He was director of the Australian Institute of International Affairs, 1969-1976.

From 1982-1985, he served as the inaugural chairman of the Radford College School Board. In 1985 Millar was seconded to London University as professor of Australian studies and the second head of the Australian Studies Centre (then part of the Institute of Commonwealth Studies; now the Menzies Australia Institute at King's College London). Following his retirement in 1990, he remained in London until his death and held part-time positions at the London School of Economics and King's College London.

Millar was made a fellow of the Academy of the Social Sciences in Australia in 1982 and an Officer of the Order of Australia in 1983. He married Ann Drake-Brockman in 1951 and they had two daughters and one son. The marriage was dissolved in 1986. He remarried in 1990. A Christian Scientist and both a proud Australian and Western Australian, he would also proudly remind people of his Scottish ancestry - as evidenced by the spelling of his surname with the Scottish `ar' ending.

Millar was a prolific writer on international relations and defence and strategic studies. In honour of his work in this field, the Graduate Studies in Strategy and Defence program (based in the SDSC) offers up to three T.B. Millar Scholarships each year to outstanding students.

== Works ==
- Australia's defence (1965)
- The Commonwealth and the United Nations (1967)
- Australia's defence policies 1945-65 (1968)
- Australia's foreign policy (1968)
- Australia in peace and war (1978)
- The East-West strategic balance (1981)
- South African dilemmas (1985).

In 1995 a book of essays was published in his honour, edited by Coral Bell, entitled Nation, region and context: studies in peace and war.
