= Michael Thawley =

Senior Australian public servant

Michael Thawley AO
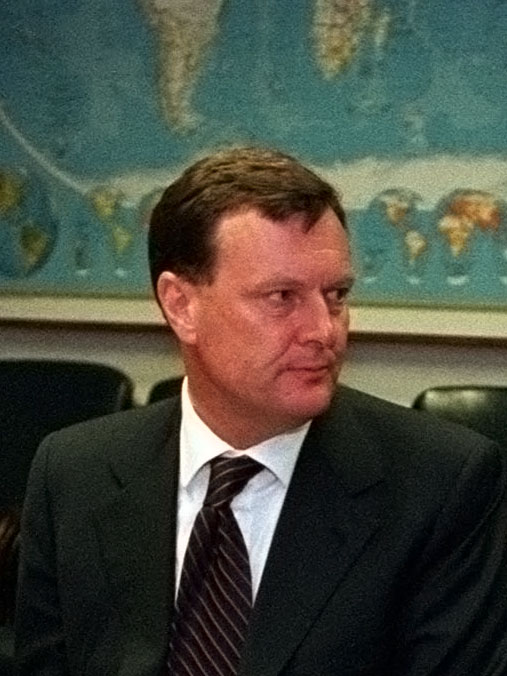

Secretary of the Department of the Prime Minister and Cabinet
- In office 1 December 2014 – 23 January 2016

18th Ambassador of Australia to the United States
- In office February 2000 – May 2005
- Preceded by: Andrew Peacock
- Succeeded by: Dennis Richardson

Personal details
- Born: Michael Joseph Thawley; 16 April 1950 (age 76) London, England
- Party: Liberal Party
- Education: Australian National University
- Occupation: Public servant, Diplomat

Michael Joseph Thawley, AO (born 16 April 1950) is a former senior Australian public servant. From December 2014 to January 2016 he was Secretary of the Department of the Prime Minister and Cabinet. He has served as Chancellor of Torrens University Australia since February 2025.

== Life and career ==
Thawley was born in London in 1950, the son of an Anglican clergyman, raised in Queensland, and educated at Geelong Grammar School and then at the Australian National University. He joined the Department of Foreign Affairs in 1972. There he held various posts including Head of the Papua New Guinea and New Zealand bureaus; Head of Current Intelligence at the Office of National Assessments; Minister at the Australian Embassy, Tokyo; Head of the International Division of the Department of Prime Minister and Cabinet. He was the International Advisor to Prime Minister John Howard, between 1996 and 1999.

From 2000 to 2005, Michael Thawley was Australian Ambassador to the United States of America. While Thawley was in the role, the Australia–United States Free Trade Agreement was established, ensuring greater access to the US market for Australian products. When he left the post, US President George Bush hosted a farewell reception for him in the Oval Office, and dignitaries including US Vice President Dick Cheney, US Defence Secretary Donald Rumsfeld and US Secretary of State Condoleezza Rice attended.

He was a Senior Vice President and International Advisor at Capital Strategy Research Inc. He was also a board member of the Lowy Institute for International Policy.

In October 2014, Prime Minister Tony Abbott announced Thawley had been appointed Secretary of the Department of the Prime Minister and Cabinet, commencing 1 December 2014. According to media, his brief entering into the role was to concentrate on the Australian Government's economic agenda, and to give more structure and form to coordinate the budgetary implications, across all Australian Government departments, of Coalition Government promises and what the Labor Party blocks in Parliament. It was also noted that he could "bring fresh energy to the urgent task of rebuilding relationships between the public service and the political branch." He announced on 24 November 2015 that he would be standing down from the position in January 2016.

Thawley was appointed Chancellor of Torrens University Australia in February 2025.

Thawley married Deborah Wilkins, an ANU prize winner in French in 1969, in 1970. They have three sons, one of whom is The Hon Justice Thomas Thawley, and five grandchildren.

== Awards and honours ==
Thawley was awarded a Centenary Medal in January 2001 for a significant contribution over many years to international relations. In June 2006 he was appointed an Officer of the Order of Australia.

Diplomatic posts
Preceded by Andrew Peacock	Australian Ambassador to the United States; 2000–2005	Succeeded by Dennis Richardson
Government offices
Preceded by Ian Watt	Secretary of the Department of the Prime Minister and Cabinet; 2014–2016	Succeeded by Martin Parkinson
