= Dennis Richardson (public servant) =

Australian public servant and diplomat

Dennis Richardson AC
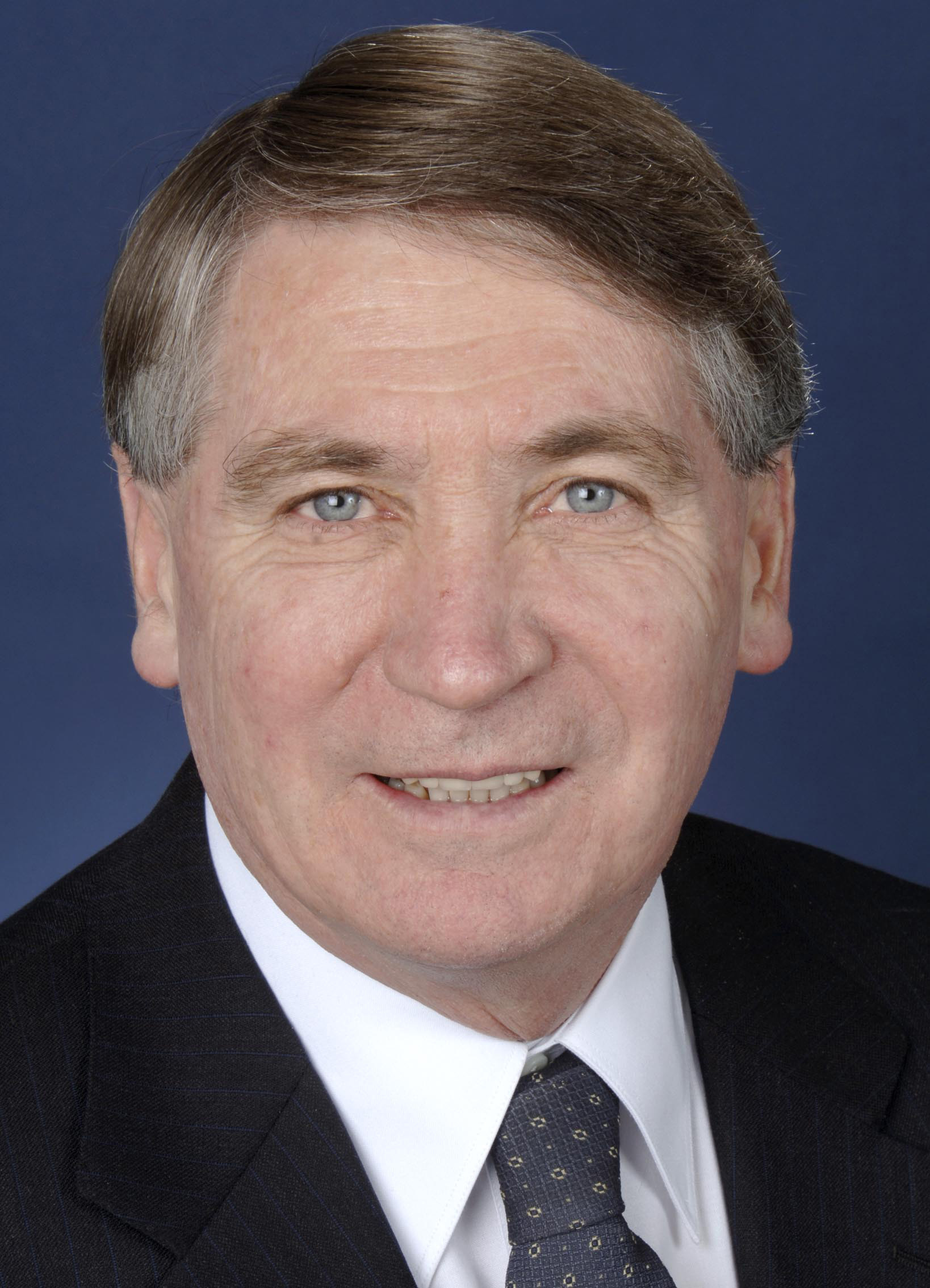
- Official portrait, 2005

Secretary of the Department of Defence
- In office 18 October 2012 – 12 May 2017
- Preceded by: Duncan Lewis
- Succeeded by: Greg Moriarty

Secretary of the Department of Foreign Affairs and Trade
- In office January 2010 – 18 October 2012
- Preceded by: Michael L'Estrange
- Succeeded by: Peter Varghese

19th Ambassador of Australia to the United States
- In office 20 June 2005 – 1 February 2010
- Preceded by: Michael Thawley
- Succeeded by: Kim Beazley

10th Director-General of Security
- In office 11 October 1996 – 27 May 2005
- Prime Minister: John Howard
- Preceded by: David Sadleir
- Succeeded by: Paul O'Sullivan

Personal details
- Born: Dennis James Richardson; 14 May 1947 (age 79) Kempsey, New South Wales
- Spouse: Betty Richardson
- Education: University of Sydney (BA [Hons])
- Profession: Diplomat public servant

Dennis James Richardson (born 14 May 1947) is an Australian retired public servant and diplomat who served as the Secretary of the Department of Defence from 2012 to 2017 and Secretary of the Department of Foreign Affairs from 2010 to 2012. He was previously the 10th Director-General of Security from 1996 to 2005 and the 19th Ambassador of Australia to the United States of America from 2005 to 2010. Richardson was appointed to lead a review into Australia's law enforcement and intelligence agencies in late 2025.

== Background and career ==
Richardson was keenly interested in current affairs as a boy. He attended the University of Sydney where he received a Bachelor of Arts with Honours (1965–68). He started his Australian Public Service career in the Department of External Affairs in 1969. His history supervisor had suggested he apply to the Department rather than continuing with plans to become a teacher.

Between 1969 and 1986 Richardson had various positions in the Department of Foreign Affairs, including postings to Kenya, Papua New Guinea and Indonesia. In 1986 he was appointed Head of the Refugee and Humanitarian Branch in the Department of Immigration and Ethnic Affairs. In 1987, Richardson moved to the Department of Prime Minister and Cabinet, being appointed Head of the International Division in 1988. In 1990-91, Richardson was seconded to Prime Minister Bob Hawke's office where he served as Chief of Staff. In 1992, Richardson conducted a review of the Australian Intelligence Community Post Cold War. In 1993, Richardson was appointed Deputy Secretary of the Department of Immigration and Multicultural Affairs. He was Director-General of the Australian Security Intelligence Organization from October 1996 to May 2005. Richardson was Australian Ambassador to the United States of America (2005–2010) and Secretary of the Department of Foreign Affairs and Trade (2010–2012). While Australian Ambassador to the US he visited all 50 states, driving with his wife to all but Hawaii.

In October 2012, Richardson was appointed Secretary of the Department of Defence. Richardson announced on 19 April 2017 that he would retire on 12 May 2017. Associate Secretary Brendan Sargeant was acting Secretary until the appointment of Greg Moriarty on 4 September 2017.

Richardson was on the board of the US Studies Centre at Sydney University from 2010-2017. Following his retirement from the Public Service, he was appointed to the Board of Linfox Australia. In addition to Linfox, Richardson currently serves on the Boards of Vault Cloud, The Australian Wildlife Conservancy, The Canberra Raiders NRL Club and is Chair of StarFlight Victoria.

In mid 2018, Richardson was appointed by the Australian Government to conduct a Comprehensive Review of Australian Intelligence Legislation. A classified report was given to the government in December 2019, with an unclassified report published in December 2020.

On 21 December 2025, prime minister Anthony Albanese announced that Richardson would lead the Independent Commonwealth Review into Australia's federal law enforcement and intelligence agencies which will investigate the Bondi Beach terrorist attack.

In January 2026, Richardson was appointed to the Royal Commission on Antisemitism and Social Cohesion following the shooting in Bondi. His review will become part of the commission with his assistance being utilised for the inquiry's work.

In March 2026, Richardson resigned from the Bondi royal commission.

== Honours ==
Richardson received the Centenary Medal in 2001. He was appointed an Officer of the Order of Australia (AO) in 2003 for service to the community in a range of public policy areas including foreign policy, immigration and security, and advanced to Companion of the Order of Australia in 2019 for his "eminent service to public administration" in the fields of national security, defence and foreign policy. He was also awarded the Distinguished Service Order by the President of Singapore on 8 June 2017.

Richardson received an Honorary Doctorate of Letters from the University of Sydney in November 2018 and an Honorary Doctorate of Laws from the Australian National University in December 2018.

== Personal life ==
Richardson is married to Betty, a real estate agent, and has two children, Mark and Natalie.

In 2020, he revealed his views on several public policy positions in an interview. He said he now supported calls for the establishment of a Commonwealth Integrity Commission to restore public trust, in part because ministerial staffers had been excluded from being investigated by many inquiries. He supported Australia becoming a republic because he believed that a head of state should not be foreign, and was opposed to the ban on Catholics becoming monarch. He also confirmed several anecdotes from his diplomatic career, saying he was the only person, to his knowledge, to have attended a diplomatic ceremony in a "waiter's uniform" after hiring a suit during a posting to East Africa. Another anecdote concerned his Rottweiler, Henry, downing politician Peter Costello at a diplomatic residence. Richardson agreed with characterisations of himself as being tough, an occasional micromanager, and a "cheeky bastard".

Diplomatic posts
Preceded by Michael Thawley	Australian Ambassador to the United States; 2005–2010	Succeeded by Kim Beazley
Government offices
Preceded by David Sadleir	Director-General of Security; 1996–2005	Succeeded by Paul O'Sullivan
Preceded by Michael L'Estrange	Secretary of the Department of Foreign Affairs and Trade; 2010–2012	Succeeded by Peter Varghese
Preceded by Duncan Lewis	Secretary of the Department of Defence; 2012–2017	Succeeded by Greg Moriarty
