= Director-General of Security =

Executive officer of the Australian Security Intelligence Organisation

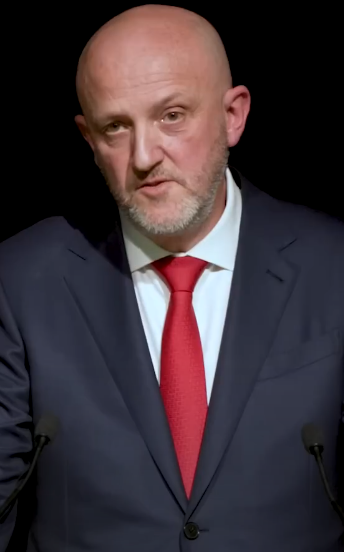
- Incumbent; Mike Burgess since 16 September 2019
- Nominator: Prime Minister
- Appointer: Governor-General
- Term length: 7 years; renewable infinitely
- Inaugural holder: Justice Geoffrey Reed
- Formation: 1949

The director-general of security is the executive officer of the Australian Security Intelligence Organisation (ASIO), Australia's national security agency. The director-general, through ASIO, has overall responsibility for the protection of the country and its citizens from espionage, sabotage (especially sabotage of critical infrastructure), politically motivated violence, attacks on the Australian defence system, terrorism and acts of foreign interference.

The director-general is assisted by two deputy directors-general, although only one of the former deputies, David Fricker, has been publicly identified. David Fricker left ASIO in 2011. The director-general is subject to the directions of the attorney-general, although convention allows the director-general direct access to the prime minister. The director-general of security is often regarded as Australia's 'top spy', even though they may not have been previously engaged in intelligence upon appointment. The incumbent director-general is Mike Burgess, appointed on 16 September 2019.

The director-general is appointed by the governor-general on the advice of the prime minister and holds office under the Australian Security Intelligence Organisation Act 1979. The normal term of appointment is limited to seven years, although the director-general is eligible for reappointment.

== Directors-general of security ==
Tenure	Name
1949–1950	Justice Sir Geoffrey Reed
1950–1970	Brigadier Sir Charles Spry, CBE, DSO
1970–1975	Peter Barbour
1975–1976	Frank Mahony, CB, OBE
1976–1981	Justice Sir Edward Woodward, OBE
1981–1985	Harvey Barnett, AO
1985–1988	Alan Wrigley, AO
1988–1992	John Moten
1992–1996	David Sadleir, AO
1996–2005	Dennis Richardson, AO
2005–2009	Paul O'Sullivan, AO
2009–2014	David Irvine, AO
2014–2019	Major General Duncan Lewis, AO, DSC, CSC
2019–present	Mike Burgess

== See also ==
- William Simpson – Director-General of Security in Australia from 1942 to 1945
