= Peter Varghese =

Australian diplomat and public servant

Peter Varghese AO
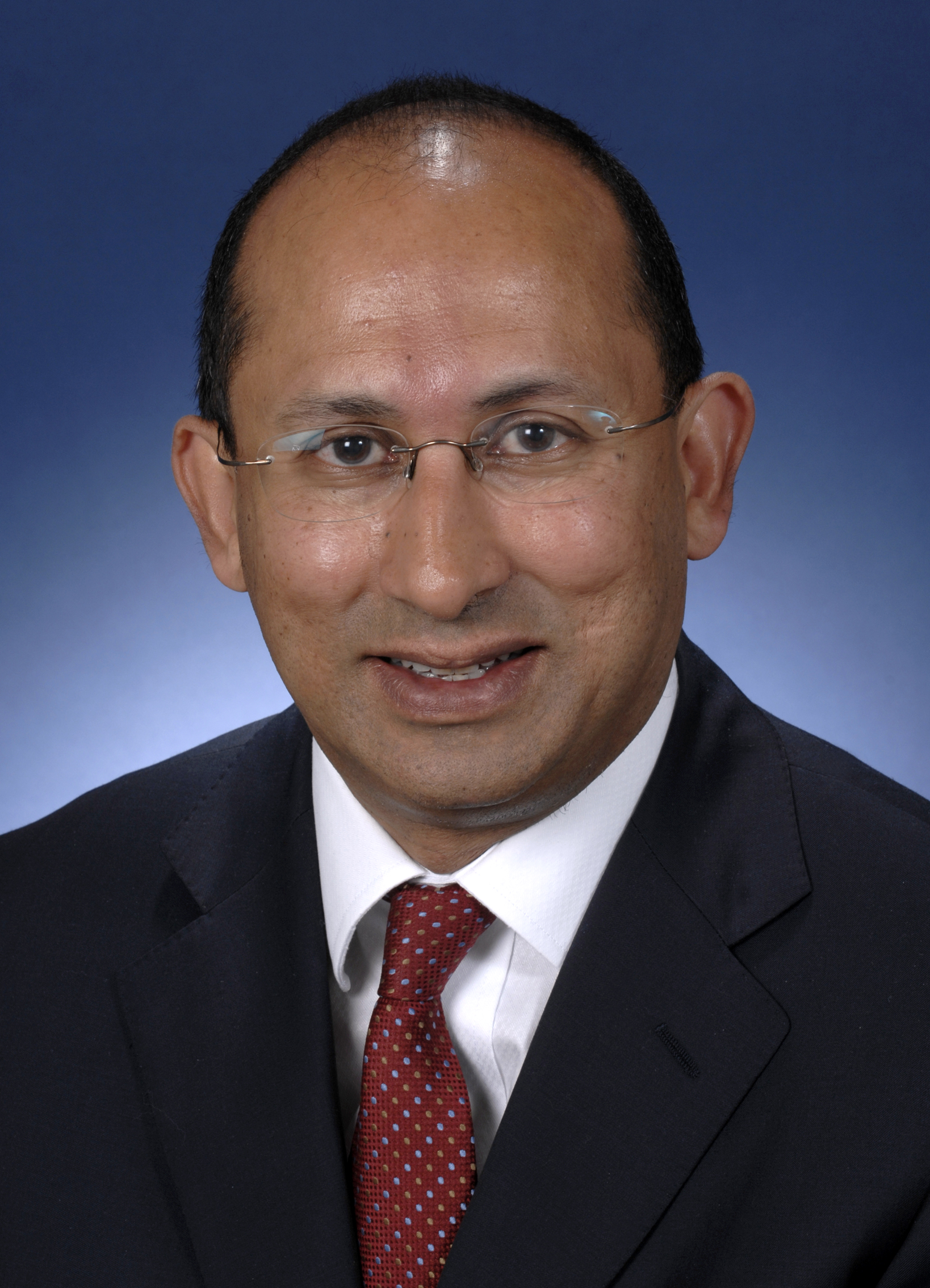
- Varghese, pictured in 2009.

Secretary of the Department of Foreign Affairs and Trade
- In office 3 December 2012 – 20 July 2016
- Preceded by: Dennis Richardson
- Succeeded by: Frances Adamson

Personal details
- Born: Peter Joseph Noozhumurry Varghese; 19 March 1956 (age 70) British Kenya
- Education: University of Queensland
- Occupation: Diplomat; Public servant

Peter Varghese AO (born 19 March 1956) is an Australian retired diplomat and public servant. He was the Secretary of the Department of Foreign Affairs and Trade from 3 December 2012 to 22 July 2016. He announced in November 2015 that he would leave the position in July 2016 to become the chancellor of the University of Queensland.

== Early life and education ==
Varghese was born in Kenya to ethnic Asian Indian parents of Nasrani Malayalee origin. He emigrated to Australia as a child in 1964, first moving to Newcastle and two years later heading to Brisbane. He studied history and graduated from the University of Queensland with a university medal.

== Career ==
Varghese's first diplomatic posting was at the Australian Embassy in Vienna from 1980 to 1983. His second overseas posting was at the Embassy of Australia, Washington, D.C. from 1986 to 1988. From 1989 to 1990, Varghese was a speechwriter to Foreign Minister Gareth Evans. Varghese's first Senior Executive Service appointment within the Department of Foreign Affairs and Trade was as the Assistant Secretary of the Staffing Branch from 1991 to 1992. In 1994 he was posted to the Australian Embassy in Tokyo. He was then the First Assistant Secretary of the Public Affairs Division from 1994 to 1996.

As Head of the White Paper Secretariat from 1996 to 1997, Varghese led the drafting of Australia's first white paper on foreign and trade policy. He was appointed the First Assistant Secretary of the International Security Division in 1997 and then seconded to the Department of the Prime Minister and Cabinet as First Assistant Secretary of the International Division from 1998 to 1999.

In 2000, Varghese was appointed the Australian High Commissioner to Malaysia and served until 2002. He then served as Deputy Secretary of the Department of Foreign Affairs and Trade from 2002 to 2003.

Varghese was then appointed as Senior Adviser (International) to Prime Minister John Howard from 2003 to 2004. From 2004 to 2009, Varghese was Director-General of the Office of National Assessments, an Australian government intelligence agency which reports directly to the Prime Minister.

From August 2009 to October 2012, Varghese was the Australian High Commissioner to India, with concurrent accreditation to Bhutan.

Varghese was then appointed the Secretary of the Department of Foreign Affairs and Trade in December 2012, serving until July 2016.

When the Abbott government took office in September 2013, Varghese had to oversee the integration of the Department of Foreign Affairs and Trade with Australian Agency for International Development. It was announced on 24 November 2015 that he would be stepping down from the position in July 2016 to take on an appointment as chancellor of the University of Queensland.

In 2016 Varghese joined the board of directors at AMP Limited. His cousin Jacob was hired as a lawyer by the firm taking action against the AMP with regards to financial misconduct.

Varghese concluded his two 5-year chancellor career on July 2026, his successor was scientist Mary O’Kane.

== Honours ==
In 2010, Varghese was appointed an Officer of the Order of Australia for distinguished service to public administration, particularly in leading reform in the Australian intelligence community and as an adviser in the areas of foreign policy and international security.

Varghese was conferred with a Doctor of Letters honoris causa by the University of Queensland in July 2013 in recognition of his distinguished service to diplomacy and Australian Public Service.

== Personal life ==
Varghese is married and has an adult son.

== References and further reading ==
- Meet Australia's most powerful public servants, news.com.au, 31 October 2013, archived from the original on 7 December 2013

Diplomatic posts
Preceded by John McCarthy	Australian High Commissioner to India; 2009–2012	Succeeded by Patrick Suckling
Preceded by Bob Cotton	Australian High Commissioner to Malaysia; 2000–2003	Succeeded by James Wise
Government offices
Preceded by Dennis Richardson	Secretary of the Department of Foreign Affairs and Trade; 2012–2016	Succeeded by Frances Adamson
Preceded by Kim Jones	Director-General of the Office of National Assessments; 2004–2009	Succeeded by Allan Gyngell
Academic offices
Preceded by John Story	Chancellor of the University of Queensland; 2016 –	Incumbent
