= Harvey Barnett =

Australian intelligence officer

Harvey Barnett AO

6th Director-General of Security
- In office 7 September 1981 – 28 July 1985
- Prime Minister: Malcolm Fraser; Bob Hawke
- Preceded by: Edward Woodward
- Succeeded by: Alan Wrigley

Personal details
- Born: Tudor Harvey Barnett; 25 December 1925 Albany, Western Australia, Australia
- Died: 23 June 1995 (aged 69) Melbourne, Victoria, Australia
- Education: University of Western Australia
- Occupation: Intelligence officer

Military service
- Allegiance: Australia
- Branch/service: Royal Australian Navy
- Years of service: 1944–1956
- Rank: Lieutenant

Tudor Harvey Barnett AO (25 December 1925 – 23 June 1995) was an Australian intelligence officer. Barnett was Director-General of Security, the head of the Australian Security Intelligence Organisation (ASIO), from 1981 to 1985.

== Early life and military service ==
Barnett was born in Albany, Western Australia to a family of shopkeepers. He attended an Anglican boarding school near Perth, and in February 1944 enslisted in the Royal Australian Navy during World War II. At the time of his discharge on 29 May 1956, he held the rank of Lieutenant in the RANVR Special Branch and was stationed at the shore training base HMAS Cerberus.

After the war, Barnett returned to university to complete a Bachelor of Arts at the University of Western Australia, where he was a contemporary of future Prime Minister Bob Hawke. He spent some time travelling in Europe where he taught in England and Germany.

== Intelligence work ==
On his return to Australia in the mid-1950s, Barnett was recruited into the Australian Secret Intelligence Service (ASIS), Australia's foreign intelligence agency. He was head of the Australian stations in Singapore, Cambodia and South Vietnam, and later rose to the position of Deputy Director-General of ASIS.

In September 1981, Barnett was appointed Director-General of Security. On 20 April 1983, Barnett requested and was granted an urgent meeting with the newly elected Prime Minister, Bob Hawke, whereupon he briefed him on what he called a 'matter of national security'—ASIO was aware of several meetings between David Combe, the national secretary of the Australian Labor Party, and First Secretary of the Soviet Embassy in Australia, Valery Ivanov. In what became known as the Combe–Ivanov affair, Hawke resolved to remove any possibility of Combe being recruited by Soviet intelligence. Ivanov was expelled from Australia, and although the second Hope Royal Commission in 1984 established that attempts were being made to recruit Combe, no intelligence breaches had taken place.

Three years after his 1985 retirement from ASIO, Barnett published his memoirs, Tale of the Scorpion (ISBN 0725105852).

Government offices
Preceded by Edward Woodward	Director-General of Security; 1981–1985	Succeeded by Alan Wrigley
