= Defence of Australia policy =

Australian defence policy, 1972–1997

The Defence of Australia Policy was Australia's dominant defence policy between 1972 and 1997. The policy was focused on the defence of continental Australia against external attack. The Australian Defence Force was tailored to defending Australia rather than developing capabilities to operate outside Australian territory.

== Development ==
The Defence of Australia (DOA) policy was adopted after the previous policy of "forward defence" was discredited in the public eye by Australia's involvement in the Vietnam War. The policy was developed during the 1970s and early 1980s before it was formalised in the 1986 Dibb Report and the 1987 and 1994 Defence White Papers.

== Implications ==
The focus of Australian defence planning was to protect Australia's northern maritime approaches (the "air-sea gap") against enemy attack. The ADF was restructured to increase its ability to strike at enemy forces from Australian bases, by increasing the size and capabilities of the Royal Australian Air Force and Royal Australian Navy, at the expense of the Army and the forces used to project power overseas (such as Australia's aircraft carrier, HMAS Melbourne, which was retired without replacement).

Specific force structure changes introduced under the DOA policy included:

- Increasing the number of units based in northern Australia
- Raising three Regional Force Surveillance Units
- Developing RAAF Base Tindal as an operational fighter base
- Developing three 'bare bases' for the RAAF in northern Queensland and Western Australia
- Development of the Jindalee over-the-horizon radar network
- Development of the Collins class submarines

Nevertheless, the adoption of the DOA policy did not involve Australia adopting a policy of neutrality or completely disbanding its ability to deploy forces overseas. During the DOA era, Australia maintained its alliances with the United States and New Zealand and sought to develop stronger defence relationships with South East Asian countries. In addition, the ADF maintained a sizeable force of transport aircraft and amphibious ships and an infantry brigade capable of rapidly deploying overseas (the 3rd Brigade). Furthermore, Australian forces continued to be deployed overseas for exercises and peace keeping operations, and a small Australian military base was permanently maintained at Butterworth in Malaysia.

== Criticisms ==
Most criticisms of the DOA policy focus on the policy's inflexibility. In particular, it is argued that Australia's foreign relations and defence interests require a force capable of rapidly deploying outside Australia. It is also argued that the DOA force structure was not capable of adequately responding to threats other than a direct attack on Australian soil. Furthermore, it is also argued that the DOA policy is unsuitable for coping with the less stable geopolitical conditions since the end of the Cold War, which has seen the Australian Army deployed more often than anticipated under DOA.

To a large extent, the Liberal Party government elected in 1996 embraced the criticisms and re-oriented Australian defence policy by placing greater emphasis on the ADF's ability to deploy overseas. This did not, however, represent a return to "forward defence" as it involved Australian expeditionary forces deploying from bases in Australia, and not the permanent stationing of Australian military units overseas. Furthermore, defending Australia from external attack remained the Australian Defence Force's primary responsibility.

== East Timor and aftermath ==
The Australian-led intervention in East Timor in 1999 highlighted the strengths and weaknesses of the policy. While the enhanced defence infrastructure in northern Australia and high-tech naval and air units played a critical role in the operation, the limited availability of deployable logistic units and infantry constrained the operation, especially in its early days.

While the Australian government has expanded the ADF's logistic capability in light of experience, the ADF's force structure remains largely unchanged from that developed during the DOA era. A key reason is that given the long distances which need to be covered to protect northern Australia, the units developed for the Defence of Australia are inherently capable of deploying outside Australia. This has created an emphasis upon a light and mobile land contingent.

== See also ==
- Foreign relations of Australia
