= Dibb Report =

The Dibb Report (Review of Australia's Defence Capabilities) was an influential review of Australia's defence plans. While the report's recommendations were not fully accepted by the Hawke government, they led to significant changes in Australia's defence policy, including adoption of the Defence of Australia Policy.

== Background ==
In February 1985, Minister for Defence Kim Beazley commissioned Paul Dibb, an external consultant and former employee of the Department of Defence, to analyse Australia's defence planning and make recommendations for future developments.

== Synopsis ==
Dibb's report was published in March 1986 and recommended for Australia to abandon the remaining elements of the forward defence policy but concentrate its military resources on the geographic areas relevant to defending the country and its economic interests from direct attack.

Dibb's recommendations were based around an assessment that "Australia is one of the most secure countries on earth" and that while there was the potential for regional conflict, the longer-term intentions and capabilities of countries in Australia's region could not be predicted and so did not form a suitable basis for planning.

Dibb recommended for Australia's military posture to be based on a strategy of denying aggressors the ability to attack the country. That was to be achieved through using a layered defence of Jindalee Operational Radar Network (over-the-horizon radar), patrol aircraft and maritime strike aircraft to protect Australia's approaches with the Army's Operational Deployment Force being responsible for defeating any landings on the Australian mainland. That would require changes to the Australian Defence Force's structure and equipment acquisition programs. The policy of self-reliance proposed by Dibb also placed less emphasis on ANZUS, its alliance with the United States, than previous policies.

== Reception ==
The Dibb Report received a mixed response. Some experts regarded it as being an important contribution to developing an independent Australian defence posture. Other experts criticised the report for calling for an essentially defensive military strategy, implying that existing Australian military capabilities be abandoned and making optimistic assumptions about the period of time available to detect and respond to new threats to Australia. Many of the Dibb Report's assumptions were used in developing the 1987 Defence White Paper, but the Government did not adopt some of Dibb's key recommendations, such as those concerning Australia's relationship with the United States and the Australian military's role in the Pacific.
