= Council for Security Cooperation in the Asia Pacific =

The Council for Security Cooperation in the Asia-Pacific (CSCAP) is a "non-governmental (second track) process for dialogue on security issues in Asia Pacific." There are currently twenty one member committees of CSCAP (from Australia, Cambodia, Canada, the European Union, India, Indonesia, Japan, Malaysia, Mongolia, Myanmar, New Zealand, North Korea, Papua New Guinea, the People's Republic of China, the Philippines, Russia, Singapore, South Korea, Thailand, the United States of America, and Vietnam) and one observer (from the Pacific Islands Forum). The importance of CSCAP for regional integration and for discussing sensitive issues that official diplomacy may not be able to take on have been pointed out by various international relations scholars.

Singapore's former President S R Nathan was one of the pioneers of CSCAP - setting the direction and content in its formative years.
