= Australian Strategic Policy Institute =

Australian think tank

Coordinates: 35.30790°S 149.13559°E

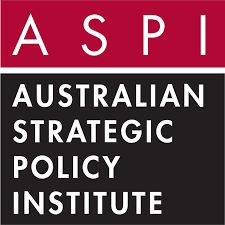

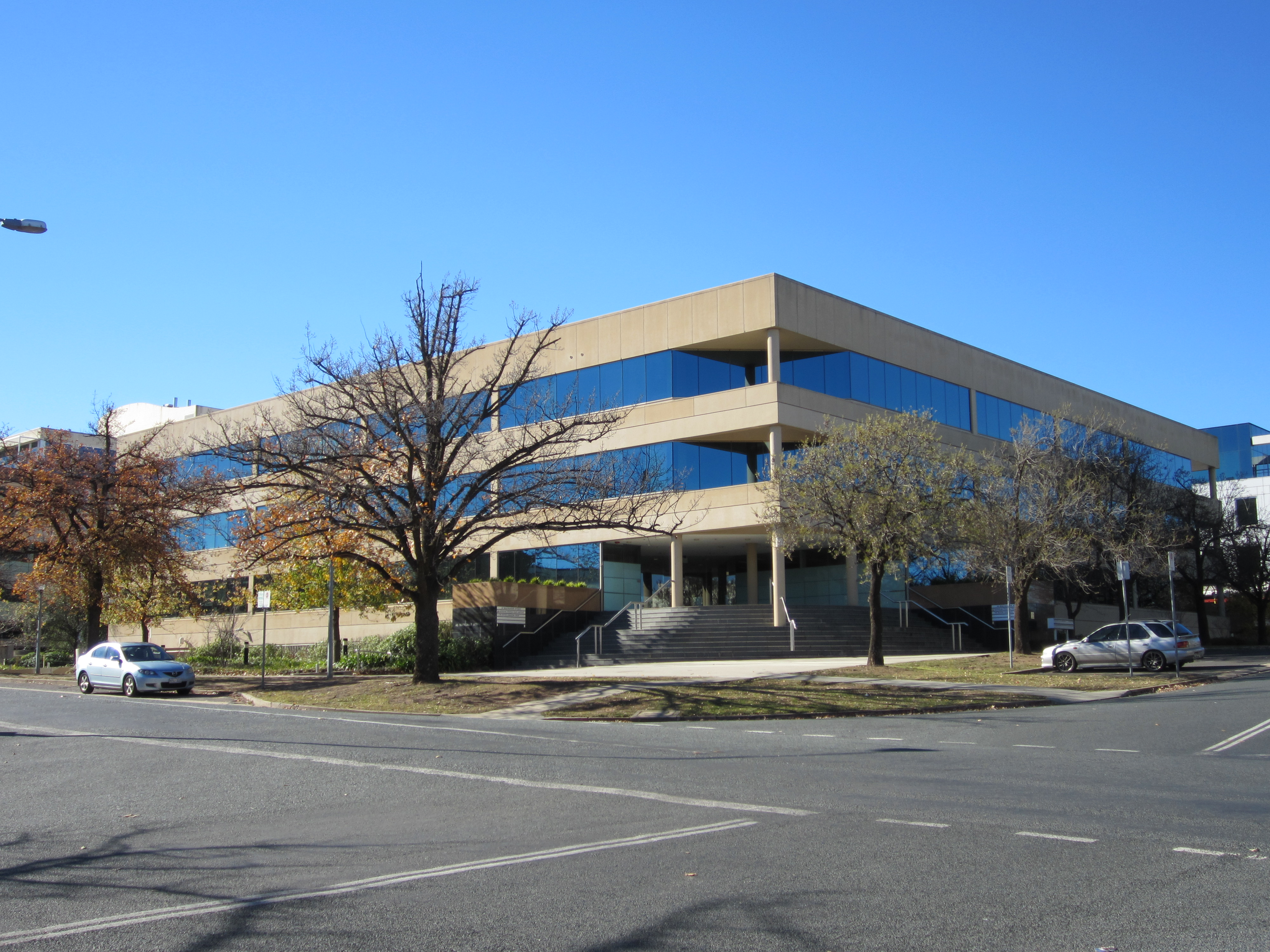
- ASPI's offices are located at 40 Macquarie Street in the Canberra suburb of Barton.
- Formation: 2001; 25 years ago
- Type: Think-tank
- Purpose: Think-tank
- Headquarters: Barton, Canberra, Australian Capital Territory
- Fields: Defence and strategic policy
- Executive Director: Justin Bassi
- Website: www.aspi.org.au

The Australian Strategic Policy Institute (ASPI) is a defence and strategic policy think tank based in Canberra, Australian Capital Territory, founded by the Australian government, and funded by the Australian Department of Defence along with overseas governments, defence, and technology companies.

== History ==
ASPI was first established in 2001 under Prime Minister John Howard to provide "policy-relevant research and analysis to better inform Government decisions and public understanding of strategic and defence issues". ASPI was officially launched at ANZAC Hall at the Australian War Memorial on 13 March 2002 by then-Australian Minister for Defence Robert Hill.

ASPI's inaugural director was Hugh White, who served as director from 2001 to 2004. White had previously been an intelligence analyst for the Office of National Assessments, an adviser to Prime Minister Bob Hawke and Defence Minister Kim Beazley, and the Deputy Secretary for Strategy and Intelligence at the Australian Department of Defence between 1995 and 2000. He is Emeritus Professor of Strategic Studies at the Australian National University.

White was succeeded by retired Major General Peter Abigail in April 2005. In February 2012, the Minister for Defence Stephen Smith announced the appointment of Peter Jennings as ASPI's new executive director, effective in May 2012.

In September 2021, the Australian government announced that it would fund the establishment of an ASPI office in Washington, D.C. at a cost of $5 million for the first two years.

In May 2022, Justin Bassi, former chief of staff for Marise Payne, was appointed as Executive Director shortly before the election. The Guardian later reported that documents obtained via a Freedom of Information request showed that Defence Minister Peter Dutton overturned ASPI's council's choice of candidate to appoint Bassi, who had been a long time advisor to Liberal politicians. The ABC reported in 2024 that the Australian Labor Party Albanese Government was concerned with the direction ASPI had taken under Bassi's leadership, including hiring a former Liberal Party staffer and publishing research that strongly criticised the ALP government's policies. Several senior analysts had left ASPI and the ABC reported that staff morale was poor.

In 2024 the former secretary of the Department of Foreign Affairs and Trade Peter Varghese completed a review of government funding for strategic policy work. The government accepted most of Varghese's recommendations, including ceasing funding for ASPI's office in Washington, D.C. and reforming the institute's governance to ensure that it "remains genuinely independent and non-partisan" through the federal government and opposition nominating two members of ASPI's council each. In response to the review, Bassi stated that the change to ASPI's governance would reduce its ability to provide independent advice. The federal opposition and Australian Greens were also critical of the change to ASPI's governance arrangements.

== Funding ==
The ASPI was established by the Australian Government in 2001 as a company limited by guarantee under the 2001 Corporations Act. At the time it was 100% funded by the Australian Department of Defence, but this had fallen to 43% in the 2018-19 financial year. In 2020, Myriam Robin in the Australian Financial Review identified three sources of funding, in addition to the Department of Defence. ASPI receives funding from defence contractors such as Lockheed Martin, BAE Systems, Northrop Grumman, Thales Group and Raytheon Technologies. It also receives funding from technology companies such as Microsoft, Oracle Australia, Telstra, and Google. Finally, it receives funding from foreign governments including Japan, Taiwan and the Netherlands.

For the 2019-2020 financial year, ASPI listed a revenue of $11,412,096.71. The ASPI received from the Australian Department of Defence 35% of its revenue, 32% from federal government agencies, 17% from overseas government agencies, 11% from the private sector, and 3% from the defense industries. Finally, it receives funding from foreign governments including Japan, Israel, Canada, the United States, the United Kingdom, and the Netherlands.

For the 2020-2021 financial year, of its listed revenue of $10,679,834.41, the ASPI received 37.5% from the Australian Department of Defence, 24.5% from other Australian federal agencies, and 18.3% from overseas government agencies such as those from Japan, the US, and the UK. On 5 June 2021, it also received an additional grant of $5 million from the Australian Department of Defense for establishing its Washington, D.C., office over the financial years 2021–2023.

Funding by the US government to the ASPI was frozen in 2025 during the second Trump administration.

== Publications ==
ASPI regularly produces five types of publication: Strategies, Strategic Insights, Special Report, the Annuals series, and publications for its International Cyber Policy Centre.

ASPI also publishes The Strategist, a daily analysis and commentary site. The Strategist aims to "provide fresh ideas on Australia's critical defence and strategic policy choices as well as encourage and facilitate discussion and debate among the strategy community and Australian public".

ASPI has advocated for the procurement of the Northrop Grumman B-21 Raider by Australia.

In 2020, ASPI issued an apology to a researcher after falsely connecting him to the Thousand Talents Plan and China's defense industry in a report tracking Chinese universities with ties to the People's Liberation Army. Senator Kim Carr criticized the usage of ASPI's report by the Australian Research Council, which led to the naming of 32 academics suspected of Chinese defense research ties by The Australian, in what Carr referred to as a "blacklist", while also noting ASPI's own disclaimer that the report should not be taken as evidence of wrongdoing. The Australian Research Council admitted that 30 of the 32 academics named were cleared of any national security concerns.

In December 2021, Twitter removed 2,160 accounts linked to Chinese regional and state propaganda campaigns as a result of analysis by ASPI.

In March 2023, ASPI launched its "Critical Technology Tracker", a project and accompanied website. Amongst its key findings, at the time of reporting, were that China leads the world in 37 out of 44 critical technologies, with Western democracies falling behind in the race for scientific and research breakthroughs.

In 2025, ASPI halted its work on China-related research and data projects after the second Trump administration stopped funding. Previously, the US government funded around 70% of ASPI's China-related work.

== Reception ==
ASPI has been described by The Diplomat and Myriam Robin in the Australian Financial Review as being one of Australia's most influential national security policy think tanks.

In February 2020, Australian Labor Party Senator Kim Carr described the ASPI as "hawks intent on fighting a new cold war." Former Foreign Minister Bob Carr (no relation) said the ASPI provides a "one-sided, pro-American view of the world" and criticised the group for taking what he claimed was almost $450,000 from the U.S. State Department, to track Australian universities with Chinese research collaborations, and "vilifying and denigrating Australian researchers and their work." Bob Carr's criticism of ASPI came after ASPI president Peter Jennings had raised questions about the donation of $1.8 million by a Chinese billionaire to a group related to Carr. ASPI replied that it "doesn't have an editorial line on China, but we have a very clear method for how we go about our research," and claimed that the true amount of State Department funding was less than half that amount stated by Carr. ASPI was criticized by former diplomats John Menadue, Geoff Raby, and Bruce Haigh, with Haigh referring to ASPI as serving the foreign policy interests of the Liberal Party of Australia. In July 2022 an article in The Economist described ASPI as "hawkish". The ABC stated in 2024 that ASPI was "known for its critical stance on China".

In October 2018, the Australian Digital Transformation Agency criticised an ASPI report on the Australian Government's digital identity program. The Agency stated that the report "was inaccurate and contained many factual errors", which "demonstrate a clear misunderstanding of how the digital identity system is intended to work". The author of the report responded to the criticism, saying his concerns were acknowledged in private despite being publicly rejected by the agency.In June 2020, ASPI was criticised by Chinese Foreign Ministry spokesman, Zhao Lijian for claiming that the Chinese government was behind cyber attacks against the Australian government and Australian businesses. In response, ASPI executive director Peter Jennings said the ministry's comments were an attempt to distract attention from the think tank's research into the Chinese government.

In November 2020, the Chinese government released a letter containing a list of grievances it had with the Australian government and a threat of economic retaliation. One of the points of contention was "funding 'anti-China' research at the Australian Strategic Policy Institute". The Australian government rejected the contents of the letter.

Writing in Crikey, David Hardaker described the ASPI as a "powerful voice in the policy debate on Australia's defence strategy". Hardaker wrote that even though ASPI called itself independent, it was "very much a creature of the defence establishment". He stated that since its foundation in 2002, ASPI's funding has increasingly come from the defence industry and foreign governments, and its governing board includes people who work for defence contractors. According to Hardaker, the interconnections between the defence industry and think tanks such as the ASPI "gives weapons manufacturers huge scope to influence the nation's decision-making on how it deals with China".

Hugh White and former senior Department of Defence official Allan Behm have argued that ASPI has diverged from its initial role of providing independent analysis. They believe that while the institute was initially independent and critiqued government positions, for instance by disputing the rationale for Australia participating in the Iraq War during 2002 and 2003, it now has a single position on how Australia should respond to China. White has stated that this position aligns with the "Canberra orthodoxy on those big questions". Other analysts have also expressed concerns that ASPI has taken a "hawkish" attitude towards China, though the institute's work in analysing the Australian defence budget and structure of the Australian Defence Force continues to be well regarded.

In March 2023, ASPI's Peter Jennings, along with editor Peter Hartcher of The Sydney Morning Herald and The Age, received criticism for a series of "Red Alert" articles which predicted armed conflict with China within three years, a timeframe which has been cited as at odds with China research. In particular, Jennings argued that a potential conflict between China and Taiwan could result in "missile attacks on military facilities on the Australian mainland and cyberattacks on critical infrastructure" as US troops emerge in Australia, and had previously argued that China's security pact with Solomon Islands would lead to Chinese ships and aircraft stationed being in the latter "within weeks". Former Prime Minister Paul Keating described the articles as "the most egregious and provocative news presentation of any newspaper I have witnessed in over 50 years of active public life"; professor of history James Curran noted that the series represent a "fairly full-frontal assault on Penny Wong's [defense] policy" by influential figures within the defense establishment, while Allan Gyngell, professor of foreign policy, described the articles as "war propaganda" advocating for closer military relations with the US. Guardian Australia noted that several experts it had spoken to expressed unease about ASPI's dominant role in the defense debate, and that even though ASPI had no formal involvement in the "Red Alert" articles, a number of panelists in the series are affiliated with the organization.

In April 2024 ASPI's executive director claimed that the Chinese government had directed hackers to attack the institute in an attempt to "punish and intimidate" it.

Varghese made a number of statements concerning ASPI in his 2024 Independent Review of Commonwealth funding for strategic policy work. He found that ASPI had published "some ground breaking analysis", including reports that had significantly influenced government policies or improved awareness of important issues. However, Varghese was critical of "op-ed overreach" by Jennings which had led the institute to publish a number of articles "based on personal opinions rather than deep ASPI research", with some including "partisan commentary and even personal criticism". Varghese stated that this led to a perception that ASPI had an "institutional view" and was no longer providing "non-partisan analysis of policy". He was critical of ASPI's board for not preventing this. The review noted that Bassi and the chair of ASPI's council were working "to recalibrate ASPI’s approach". Varghese also discussed ASPI's office in Washington, D.C. He judged that the office was not necessary and that it was inappropriate for an Australian Government-funded think tank to be seeking to influence policy debates in the United States, with this being the role of the Embassy of Australia.

In May 2025 Prime Minister Anthony Albanese strongly criticised ASPI after its annual Cost of Defence report argued that the government's funding for defence was insufficient and making Australians less secure. Albanese stated that the government was increasing defence funding, and said that ASPI "need to … have a look at themselves and the way they conduct themselves in debates". The ABC reported that there were increasing concerns in the Australian Labor Party over the approach ASPI had been taking since Bassi became its executive director. In June the same year Defence Industry Minister Pat Conroy also criticised ASPI for being biased against the ALP while speaking at a conference the institute had organised. Conroy alleged that ASPI had "radically and illogically" changed its methodology for calculating defence expenditure in Cost of Defence reports after the ALP was elected in 2022 to make defence expenditure appear lower than that under Coalition governments. Conroy also stated that ASPI had ignored problems with the previous government's defence acquisition program. Bassi rejected Conroy's claims and stated that ASPI was "not one sided but singly focused on analysing the capabilities, numbers and policies of the government of the day".
