= Edward Woodward (judge) =

Australian jurist (1928–2010)

Sir Edward Woodward AC, OBE, QC

5th Director-General of Security
- In office 9 March 1976 – 4 September 1981
- Prime Minister: Malcolm Fraser
- Preceded by: Frank Mahony
- Succeeded by: Harvey Barnett

Personal details
- Born: Albert Edward Woodward; 6 August 1928 Ballarat, Victoria, Australia
- Died: 15 April 2010 (aged 81)
- Parent: Eric Woodward (father)
- Education: University of Melbourne
- Profession: Jurist

Sir Albert Edward Woodward AC, OBE, QC (6 August 1928 – 15 April 2010) was an Australian jurist.

== Life and career ==
Woodward was born in Ballarat in to Eric Woodward (later as Lieutenant General Sir Eric Woodward, a governor of New South Wales) and Amy Freame (Weller), Lady Woodward. After completing both his primary and secondary education at Melbourne Grammar School, Woodward continued his studies at the University of Melbourne, where he graduated with a Master of Laws. He was admitted to the bar in 1951 and was appointed a Queen's Counsel in 1965. During his career, he sat on several boards and 17 Royal Commissions, on four of which he was the chairman.

The most famous of these was the Aboriginal Land Rights Commission in 1973–74. He was president of the Trade Practices Tribunal, 1974–76 and a justice of the Federal Court of Australia, 1977–90. As director-general of security between 1976 and 1981, he headed the Australian Security Intelligence Organisation.

He was a member of Camberwell Grammar School Council between 1972 and 1987 and chairman in 1987. He was made a life governor of the school in 2002.

In 1990 he succeeded Sir Roy Douglas Wright as chancellor of his alma mater, the University of Melbourne, a post he held until 2001.

He died in 2010, on 15 April 2010, aged 81.

== Honours ==
Woodward was made an Officer of the Order of the British Empire in 1969, for service as Royal Commissioner into the Stevedoring Industry. He was made a Knight Bachelor in the 1982 Birthday Honours and Companion of the Order of Australia in 2001.

He declined the governorship of Victoria on the grounds that he did not think it was appropriate for an atheist to hold the position.

== Publications ==
- Woodward, Albert Edward (1990). Three wigs and five hats. Darwin: Northern Territory Library Service. ISBN 0-7245-0581-4. OCLC 37093584.
- Woodward, Edward (2005). One brief interval : a memoir. Carlton, Vic.: Miegunyah Press. ISBN 0-522-85163-0. OCLC 123913032.

Government offices
Preceded by Frank Mahony	Director-General of Security; 1976–1981	Succeeded by Harvey Barnett
Academic offices
Preceded by Sir Roy Wright	Chancellor of the University of Melbourne; 1990–2001	Succeeded by Fay Marles
