= 1987 Defence White Paper =

Australian Department of Defence review

The Defence of Australia (1987 Defence White Paper)
- Presented: 19 March 1987
- Commissioned by: Department of Defence

The 1987 Defence White Paper, titled The Defence of Australia, was a white paper published by the Australian Department of Defence during the Hawke government introduced by Minister for Defence Kim Beazley.

== Background ==
The first Defence White Paper was published in 1976 under the Whitlam government. The 1987 Defence White Paper expanded the emphasis on self-reliance that was established in the 1976 Defence White Paper, no longer focusing defence policy primarily on attracting the attention of powerful allies. These white papers formalized the Defence of Australia policy.

The 1987 White Paper was released following the Dibb Review of Australia's Defence Capabilities and the Cooksey Review of Australia's Defence Exports and Defence Industry.

== Synopsis ==
The paper affirmed that Australia faced no military threat, barring the remote threat of global war. It asserted that no country had the capacity or motivation, to sustain high level military operations against Australia, though Australia would still be vulnerable to harassment across its coastline and sea approaches. The paper re-affirmed self-reliance and adopted the strategy of defence in depth, as opposed to the publicly unpopular forward defence strategy which saw Australia intervene in the Vietnam War. The paper restated the importance of Australia's alliance with the United States and declared Australia's area of military interest to include much of Oceania and South East Asia.

The paper did not announce any new capability projects or any detailed expenditure proposal. However, it did emphasise the need to acquire modern technology such as satellite communications and airborne early warning aircraft.
