= List of Royal Australian Navy admirals =

The following is a list of Australians who have attained admiral rank within the Royal Australian Navy (RAN); that is, officers who have held the rank of admiral (four-star rank), vice admiral (three-star rank) or rear admiral (two-star rank). The Commonwealth Naval Forces were established on 1 March 1901, following the Federation of Australia, as Australia's naval force. The service was reorganised and re-titled as the RAN in 1911. William Creswell, regarded as the "father" of the RAN, was the service's first member to attain flag rank on being promoted to rear admiral in 1911; he later also became the first vice admiral (1922). In 1936, Sir George Hyde became the first officer to be promoted to full admiral, one of only eight members of the RAN to attain this rank as of July 2024. A further 29 individuals have reached vice admiral in the RAN and 144 rear admiral. Five officers have additionally retired with the honorary rank of rear admiral.

== Admirals ==
Australian admiral's rank insignia

A dash (—) in the "Died" column indicates that the person is still living.

The rank of admiral is the most senior rank within the RAN to which, excluding ceremonial appointments, any officer has been promoted. Only the five-star rank of admiral of the fleet is higher, but it has been held in only a ceremonial capacity. As there are currently no appointments in the Australian Defence Force (ADF) at the five-star level, there is no prospect of a RAN officer achieving the rank in a professional (i.e. non-ceremonial) capacity. With the current structure of the ADF, the rank of admiral is held only when an officer of the RAN is appointed as Chief of the Defence Force. There was, however, an exception to this when Michael Hudson was promoted to admiral on the day of his retirement in 1991 by Prime Minister Bob Hawke in recognition of his six years of service as Chief of the Naval Staff.

Admirals of the RAN are as follows:

Name	Born	Died	Date promoted	Senior command(s)	Notes
Chris Barrie	1946	—	4 July 1998	Chief of the Defence Force (1998–02), Vice Chief of the Defence Force (1997–98)	
Alan Beaumont	1934	2004	17 April 1993	Chief of the Defence Force (1993–95), Vice Chief of the Defence Force (1989–92)	
Mark Hammond*	—	—	9 July 2026	Chief of the Defence Force (2026–), Chief of Navy (2022–26)	
Michael Hudson	1933	2005	8 March 1991	Chief of Naval Staff (1985–91), Flag Officer Commanding HM Australian Fleet (1982–83)	
Sir George Hyde	1877	1937	12 July 1936	First Naval Member, Australian Commonwealth Naval Board (1931–37), Rear Admiral Commanding HM Australian Squadron (1926–29)	
David Johnston	1962	—	10 July 2024	Chief of the Defence Force (2024–26), Vice Chief of the Defence Force (2018–24), Chief of Joint Operations (2014–18)	
Sir Victor Smith	1913	1998	23 November 1970	Chairman, Chiefs of Staff Committee (1970–75), Chief of Naval Staff (1968–70), Flag Officer Commanding HM Australian Fleet (1966–67)	
Sir Anthony Synnot	1922	2001	21 April 1979	Chief of the Defence Force Staff (1979–82), Chief of Naval Staff (1976–79)	

== Vice admirals ==
Australian vice admiral's rank insignia

A dash (—) in the "Died" column indicates that the person is still living.

This along with the * (asterisk) indicates that the vice admiral is still a serving member of the RAN.

Vice admiral is the highest permanent rank in the RAN. The rank of vice admiral is always held by the Chief of Navy, though is also held when a RAN officer is appointed as Vice Chief of the Defence Force, Chief of Joint Operations, Chief of Joint Capabilities or an equivalent position.

Vice admirals of the RAN are as follows:

Name	Born	Died	Date promoted	Senior command(s)	Notes
Tim Barrett	1959	—	24 June 2014	Chief of Navy (2014–18), Commander Australian Fleet (2011–14), Commander Border Protection Command (2010–11)	
Matthew Buckley*	1972	—	7 July 2026	Chief of Navy (2026–), Deputy Chief of Navy (2025–26), Head of Nuclear Submarine Capability (2023–24), Head of Capability Nuclear-Powered Submarine Task Force (2022–23)	
Sir Henry Burrell	1904	1988	24 February 1959	First Naval Member, Australian Commonwealth Naval Board (1959–62), Flag Officer Commanding HM Australian Fleet (1958–59; 1955–56)	
Donald Chalmers	1942	—	July 1997	Chief of Navy (1997–99), Maritime Commander Australia (1993–95)	
Sir William Clarkson	1859	1934	1 November 1922 (Note: Engineer Rear Admiral Clarkson was transferred to the Retired List with the rank of engineer vice admiral on 1 November 1922.)	Third Naval Member (1911–22)	
Sir John Collins	1899	1989	10 May 1950	First Naval Member, Australian Commonwealth Naval Board (1948–55), Rear Admiral Commanding HM Australian Squadron (1945–46; 1944)	
Russ Crane	1954	—	July 2008	Chief of Navy (2008–11), Deputy Chief of Navy (2006–08)	
Sir William Creswell	1852	1933	1 September 1922 (Note: Creswell, who served as First Naval Member, Australian Commonwealth Naval Board from 1911 to 1919, was promoted to vice admiral on the Retired List in 1922.)	First Naval Member, Australian Commonwealth Naval Board (1911–19), Director, Commonwealth Naval Forces (1904–11)	
Sir Roy Dowling	1901	1969	7 June 1955	Chairman, Chiefs of Staff Committee (1959–61), First Naval Member, Australian Commonwealth Naval Board (1955–59)	
Ray Griggs	1961	—	June 2011	Vice Chief of the Defence Force (2014–18), Chief of Navy (2011–14)	
Sir Hastings Harrington	1906	1965	24 February 1962	First Naval Member, Australian Commonwealth Naval Board (1962–65), Flag Officer Commanding HM Australian Fleet (1959–62)	
Justin Jones*	—	—	4 July 2024	Chief of Joint Operations (2024–), Deputy Chief of Joint Operations (2024), Commander Maritime Border Command (2022–24)	
Peter Jones	1957	—	November 2011	Chief Capability Development Group (2011–14)	
Ian Knox	1933	2024	3 July 1987	Vice Chief of the Defence Force (1987–89), Flag Officer Commanding HM Australian Fleet (1985–87), Deputy Chief of Naval Staff (1984)	
David Leach	1928	2020	21 April 1982	Chief of Naval Staff (1982–85), Chief of Naval Personnel (1989–82), Flag Officer Commanding HM Australian Fleet (1979–80)	
Ian MacDougall	1938	2020	9 March 1991	Chief of Naval Staff (1991–94), Deputy Chief of Naval Staff (1990–91), Maritime Commander Australia (1989–90)	
Sir Alan McNicoll	1908	1987	24 February 1965	Chief of Naval Staff (1965–68), Flag Officer Commanding HM Australian Fleet (1962–64)	
Stuart Mayer	1965	—	18 July 2019	Deputy Commander United Nations Command (2019–21)	
Jonathan Mead*	1964	—	November 2020	Director-General Australian Submarine Agency (2023–), Chief of the Nuclear-Powered Submarine Task Force (2021–23), Chief of Joint Capabilities (2020–21), Commander Australian Fleet (2018–20)	
Michael Noonan	1966	—	July 2018	Chief of Navy (2018–22), Deputy Chief of Navy (2016–18), Commander Border Protection Command (2013–16)	
Sir Richard Peek	1914	2010	23 November 1970	First Naval Member, Australian Commonwealth Naval Board (1970–73), Flag Officer Commanding HM Australian Fleet (1967–68), Deputy Chief of Naval Staff (1965–67)	
Chris Ritchie	1949	—	July 2002	Chief of Navy (2002–05), Deputy Chief of Navy (1999–00), Maritime Commander Australia (1997–99)	
David Shackleton	1948	—	July 1999	Chief of Navy (1999–02)	
Russ Shalders	1951	—	July 2002	Chief of Navy (2005–08), Vice Chief of the Defence Force (2002–05)	
Sir David Stevenson	1918	1998	November 1973	First Naval Member, Australian Commonwealth Naval Board (1973–76), Flag Officer Commanding HM Australian Fleet (1970–71, 1972), Deputy Chief of Naval Staff (1968–70)	
Rodney Taylor	1940	2002	March 1994	Chief of Navy (1997), Chief of Naval Staff (1994–97), Deputy Chief of Naval Staff (1991–94)	
Matt Tripovich	1956	—	28 September 2007	Chief Capability Development Group (2007–10), Head Capability Systems (2005–07)	
Robert Walls	1941	2023	April 1995	Vice Chief of the Defence Force (1995–97), Assistant Chief of Defence Force (Development) (1994–95), Maritime Commander Australia (1991–93), Deputy Chief of Naval Staff (1991)	
Sir James Willis	1923	2003	21 April 1979	Chief of Naval Staff (1979–82), Flag Officer Commanding HM Australian Fleet (1978–79)	(Note: Vice Admiral Sir James Willis was the elder brother of Rear Admiral Alan Willis.)

== Rear admirals ==
Australian rear admiral's rank insignia

A dash (—) in the "Died" column indicates that the person is still living.

This along with the * (asterisk) indicates that the rear admiral is still a serving member of the RAN.
This along with the + (plus) indicates that the officer retired with the honorary rank of rear admiral.

William Creswell was the first officer, on 1 March 1911, to attain the rank of rear admiral in the RAN. Creswell had started his career in the Royal Navy but, after immigrating to the Australian colonies, joined the South Australian Naval Forces in 1885. He transferred to the Commonwealth Naval Forces following the Federation of Australia in 1901 and became the RAN's first Director and, subsequently, First Naval Member; he is widely regarded as the "father" of the RAN. Percival McNeil, however, was the first rear admiral of the RAN (on promotion in 1934) to have been born in Australia and Robyn Walker, promoted in 2011, was the first woman to attain flag rank in the RAN.

Rear admirals of the RAN are as follows:

Name	Born	Died	Date promoted	Senior command(s)	Notes
Brian Adams	1952	—	June 2000	Head Defence Personnel Executive (2002–05), Deputy Chief of Navy (2000–02)	
Geoffrey Bayliss	1937	2022	31 July 1987	Director General Naval Health Services (1987–89)	(Note: Rear Admiral Geoffrey Bayliss is the father of Rear Admiral Katherine Richards.)
Otto Becher	1908	1977	7 January 1960	Flag Officer-in-Charge East Australia Area (1965–66), Flag Officer Commanding HM Australian Fleet (1964–65), Head of the Australian Joint Services Staff, London (1962–63), Deputy Chief of Naval Staff (1959–62; 1952–54)	
George Bennett	1926	1996	12 February 1979	Chief of Naval Technical Services (1979–80)	
Sonya Bennett*		—	2023	Commander Joint Health Command and Surgeon General of the Australian Defence Force (2023–)	
Nigel Berlyn	1934	2022	September 1984	General Manager, HMA Dockyard Garden Island (1984–90)	
Mark Bonser	1952	—	30 July 2001	Head of the Military Justice Implementation Team (2006–08), Commander, Australian Defence College (2004–06), Commander Australian Theatre (2002–04), Director General Coast Watch (2001–02)	
Sir Leighton Bracegirdle	1881	1970	31 May 1945	Military and Official Secretary to the Governor-General of Australia (1931–47)	
Peter Briggs	1945	—	November 1993	Head Submarine Capability Team (1999–01), Head Strategic Command Division (1997–99), Flag Officer Naval Training Command (1993–97)	
Herbert Buchanan+	1902	1965	10 March 1957	Flag Officer-in-Charge East Australia Area (1955–57)	
Ronald Calder	1930	2014	May 1983	Chief of Naval Engineering (1983–87)	
David Campbell	1945	—	1993	Head of Strategic Logistics (1997), Naval Support Commander (1995–97), Deputy Chief of Naval Staff (1993–95)	
Mark Campbell	—	—	2010	Head Navy Capability (2012–15), Head Helicopter Systems Division (2010–12)	
William Carr	1883	1966	7 March 1946	Director of Naval Medical Services (1932–46)	
Anthony Carwardine	1938	—	18 January 1988	Commandant of the Australian Defence Force Academy (1993–95), Head of Australian Defence Staff – Washington (1989–92), Assistant Chief of Naval Staff (Personnel) (1988–89)	
Bryan Castles	1915	2006	15 March 1969	Chief of Naval Technical Services (1969–72)	
Henry Priaulx Cayley	1877	1942	7 August 1931	Naval Representative at the Australian High Commission, London (1929–31)	
Charles Clark	1902	1965	15 September 1953	Chief of Construction (1953–59)	
Peter Clarke	1951	—	September 2001	Head of Knowledge Systems (2001–03)	
Nigel Coates	1959	2010	July 2007	Commander Australian Fleet (2007–09)	
Robert Coplans	1911	1989	26 May 1967 (Note: Coplans was promoted acting surgeon rear admiral on 20 April 1965; his rank was made substantive from 26 May 1967.)	Director-General of RAN Medical Services (1964–71)	
John Cotsell	1916	2006	31 October 1972	Director General Naval Health Services (1975–76), Director-General of RAN Medical Services (1972–75)	
Gordon Crabb	1917	2001	7 July 1966 (Note: Crabb was promoted acting rear admiral on 3 January 1966; his rank was made substantive from 7 July that year.)	Second Naval Member and Chief of Naval Supply and Works (1972–73), Flag Officer Commanding East Australian Area (1970–71), Flag Officer Commanding HM Australian Fleet (1968–70), Head of Australian Defence Staff – Washington (1966–68)	
Ian Crawford	1931	—	27 November 1984	Chief of Supply (1984–89)	
William Crossley	1930	—	3 January 1984	Chief of Naval Personnel (1984–86)	
Simon Cullen	1959	—	2010	Deputy Director of Operations, United States Central Command (2010–14)	
Anthony Dalton	1962	—	2012	Head Joint Systems Division (2015–16), DMO Helicopter Systems Division (2012–14)	
John Davidson	1924	2021	5 April 1977	Head of Australian Defence Staff – Washington (1979–82), Flag Officer Commanding East Australian Area (1977–79)	
Karel de Laat	1949	—	17 December 2007	Head Cadet Policy (2007–09)	
Ken Doolan	1939	—	9 January 1989	Assistant Chief of the Defence Force (Development) (1991–93), Maritime Commander Australia (1990–91), Assistant Chief of Naval Staff (Development) and Deputy Chief of Naval Staff (1989–90)	
Bill Dovers	1951	—	1 March 1999	Support Commander (Navy) (1999–00)	(Note: Rear Admiral Bill Dovers is the son of Rear Admiral William John Dovers.)
William John Dovers	1918	2007	11 December 1967	Flag Officer Commanding East Australia Area (1973–75), Deputy Chief of Naval Staff (1973), Flag Officer Commanding HM Australian Fleet (1971–73), Director Joint Services Plans (1968–71), Second Naval Member and Chief of Personnel (1967–68)	(Note: Rear Admiral William John Dovers is the father of Rear Admiral Bill Dovers.)
Alec Doyle	1888	1984	25 September 1943	Third Naval Member and Chief of Construction (1943–48)	
Peter Doyle	1925	2007	24 January 1977	Deputy Chief of Naval Staff (1981–82), Flag Officer Commanding HM Australian Fleet (1980–81), Chief of Joint Operations and Plans (1979–80), Chief of Naval Materiel (1977–79)	
Allan du Toit	1957	—	2008	Australian Military Representative to NATO and the European Union (2013–16), Head of Navy Capability (2012), Head Navy People and Reputation (2010–12), Commander Border Protection Command (2008–10)	
Rachel Durbin*	—	—	March 2023	Head Navy Engineering (2023–)	
Jonathan Earley*	—	—	2022	Head Military Strategic Commitments (2024–), Deputy Chief of Navy (2022–24), Commander Australian Fleet (2022)	
Harold Farncomb	1899	1971	8 January 1947	Head of Australian Defence Staff – Washington (1949–51), Rear Admiral Commanding HM Australian Squadron (1946–49)	
Charles Farquhar-Smith	1888	1968	29 January 1948 (Note: Farquhar-Smith was promoted to rear admiral on the Retired List in 1948.)	Naval Officer in Charge Hobart (1943–44), District Naval Officer Hobart (1942–43)	
Henry Feakes	1876	1950	3 September 1933 (Note: Feakes was transferred to the Retired List with the rank of rear admiral on 3 September 1933.)	Captain Superintendent of Naval Establishments and Captain-in-Charge, New South Wales (1931–33)	
Jennifer Firman*	1958	—	February 2015	Surgeon General Australia Defence Force Reserve (2015–)	
Murray Forrest	1942	2025	April 1995	Assistant Chief of Naval Staff (Personnel) (1995–97)	
Galfry Gatacre	1907	1983	7 July 1958	Flag Officer-in-Charge East Australia Area (1962–64), Second Naval Member and Chief of Naval Personnel (1962), Head of Australian Defence Staff – Washington (1960–62), Flag Officer Commanding HM Australian Fleet (1959), Deputy Chief of Naval Staff (1957–59; 1948–51)	
Raydon Gates	1952	—	January 2001	Head of Australian Defence Staff – Washington (2004–08), Maritime Commander Australia (2002–04), Commander, Australian Defence College (2001–02)	
Frank George	1910	1992	28 February 1963	Third Naval Member and Chief of Naval Technical Services (1963–67)	
Steve Gilmore	1961	—	June 2008	Head of Australian Defence Staff – Washington (2014–17), Deputy Chief of Joint Operations (2011–13), Commander Australian Fleet (2009–11), Head Navy People and Reputation (2009), Commander Navy Systems Command (2007–09)	
Geoffrey Gladstone	1921	1999	1 June 1971	Flag Officer Commanding HM Australian Fleet (1975–77), Deputy Chief of Naval Staff (1974–75), Head of the Australian Defence Staff – London (1971–73)	
Harold Glass	1918	1989	6 August 1980 (Note: Glass was promoted acting rear admiral on 5 May 1978; his rank was made substantive from 6 August 1980.)	Judge Advocate General for the Navy (1978–83)	
Lee Goddard	1968	—	2019	Commander Maritime Border Command and Commander Operation Sovereign Borders (2019–20)	
James Goldrick	1958	2023	May 2006	Commandant of the Australian Defence Force Academy (2011–12), Commander Joint Education, Training and Warfare (2008–11), Commander Border Protection Command (2006–08)	
William Graham	1916	1993	7 January 1967 (Note: Graham was promoted acting rear admiral on 1 February 1966; his rank was made substantive from 7 January 1967.)	Flag Officer Commanding East Australian Area (1972–73), Fourth Naval Member and Chief of Supply (1966–72)	
Guy Griffiths	1923	2024	30 June 1976	Flag Officer Naval Support Command (1979–80), Chief of Naval Personnel (1976–79)	
Darren Grogan*	1970	—	2023	Deputy Chief of Navy (2026–), Deputy Director, Maritime Operations, United States Pacific Fleet (2024–26)	
Adam Grunsell	—	—	9 December 2015	Head of Maritime Systems (2015–18)	
Nicholas Hammond	1945	2003	14 December 1992	Assistant Chief of Naval Staff - Materiel (1992–95)	
Max Hancock	1956	—	June 2002	Deputy Chief of Navy (2004–06), Director General Coast Watch (2002–04)	
David Harries	1903	1980	7 July 1954 (Note: Harries was promoted acting rear admiral on 1 December 1953; his rank was made substantive from 7 July 1954.)	Flag Officer-in-Charge East Australia Area (1958–60), Flag Officer Commanding HM Australian Fleet (1956–57), Head of Australian Defence Staff – Washington (1953–55)	
Simon Harrington	1948	—	July 1997	Head of Australian Defence Staff – Washington (1999–02), Support Commander (Navy) (1997–99)	
Jaimie Hatcher	1967	—	11 December 2017	Deputy Chief of Joint Operations (2019–21), Head of Military Strategic Commitments (2019), Commander Joint Task Force 633 (2018–19)	
Mark Hill	—	—	November 2020 (Note: Hill was an acting rear admiral from June 2019 to January 2020; he was promoted to substantive rear admiral in November 2020.)	Commander Maritime Border Command (2020–22), Commander Joint Task Force 633 (2019–20)	
David Holthouse	1936	2013	1 June 1986	Naval Support Commander (1991–93), Chief of Naval Personnel (1989–91), Chief Naval Engineer (1988–89), Assistant Chief of Naval Staff - Logistics (1987–88), Chief of Naval Engineering (1987), Head of Australian Defence Staff – Washington (1985–87)	
Tony Horton	1934	—	7 August 1986	Flag Officer Naval Support Command (1988–91), Chief of Naval Personnel (1986–88)	
Michael Houghton*	—	—	2025	Head Patrol Boats and Specialist Ships (2025–)	
Owen Hughes	1935	2014	4 August 1986	Director RAN Submarine Project (1986–93)	
Stephen Hughes	—	—	December 2022	Head Navy Capability (2022–26)	
Anthony Hunt	1938	2025	21 August 1989	Assistant Chief of Naval Staff - Materiel (1989–93)	
Trevor Jones	—	—	November 2009	Commander Joint Task Force 633 (2014–16), Head Military Strategic Commitments (2013–14), Deputy Chief of Navy (2011–13), Head Navy People and Reputation (2009–11)	
Bruce Kafer	1959	—	December 2016	Head Cadet, Reserve & Employer Support Division (2016–18)	
Philip Kennedy	1931	2011	2 July 1984	Chief of Naval Operational Requirements and Plans (1984–87)	
Richard Lamacraft	1948	—	January 1999	Head Systems Acquisitions (Maritime & Ground) (1999–01)	
Peter Laver	—	—	2015	Commander Maritime Border Command (2016–19)	
Colin Lawrence	—	—	5 December 2016	Head Navy Engineering (2016–21)	
Stephen Lloyd	1923	1994	May 1976	Director General Naval Health Services (1976–81)	
Lionel Lockwood	1902	1987	12 March 1955	Director of Naval Medical Services (1955–64)	
Robert Loosli	1926	2016	3 July 1979	Chief of Naval Operational Requirements and Plans (1979–81)	
John Lord	1949	—	11 February 1997	Maritime Commander Australia (1999–00), Head Joint Education and Training (1998–99), Commander Naval Training (1997–98)	
James Lybrand	—	—	31 July 2023	Commander, Australian Defence College (2023–25)	
Daryall Lynam	1926	2017	30 July 1979	Chief of Naval Technical Services (1980–83), Chief of the Service Laboratories and Trials Division (1979–80)	
Wendy Malcolm	—	—	7 December 2018	Head Patrol Boats and Specialist Ships (2022–25), Head Maritime Systems (2018–22)	
David Mann*	—	—	December 2022	Head of Virginia Delivery Division, Australian Submarine Agency (2024–), Head Joint Capabilities (2022–24)	
Peter Marshall	1962	—	January 2010	Head of Maritime Systems (2010–14)	
Sir David Martin	1933	1990	4 July 1982	Flag Officer, Naval Support Command (1984–88), Chief of Naval Personnel (1982–84)	
Neil McDonald	1922	2014	11 February 1975	Deputy Chief of Naval Staff (1978–79), Flag Officer Commanding the Australian Fleet (1977–78), Flag Officer Commanding East Australian Area (1975–77)	
Alan McFarlane	1919	2012	2 September 1973	Chief of Naval Personnel (1974–76), Chief of Naval Supply and Works (1973–74)	
Percival McNeil	1883	1951	30 June 1934	Third Naval Member and Chief of Naval Construction (1940–43), Director of Engineering (Naval) (1931–40)	
Jack Mesley	1910	1987	7 July 1965 (Note: Mesley was promoted acting rear admiral on 24 February 1965; his rank was made substantive on 7 July that year.)	Second Naval Member and Chief of Naval Personnel (1965–67)	
Rowan Moffitt	1955	—	2002	Head of the Future Submarine Program (2009–14), Deputy Chief of Joint Operations (2005–08), Maritime Commander Australia (2004–05), Deputy Chief of Navy (2002–04)	
George Dunbar Moore+	1893	1979	9 June 1950 (Note: Moore served as an acting rear admiral from 13 September 1944 until his retirement on 9 June 1950.)	Flag Officer in Command New South Wales (1947–50), Naval Officer-in-Charge Sydney (1944–47)	
Terry Morrison*	—	—	December 2025	Director Combined Maritime Operations, United States Pacific Fleet (2026–)	
Thomas Morrison	1911	1983	7 January 1962	Flag Officer-in-Charge East Australia Area (1966–68), Flag Officer Commanding HM Australian Fleet (1965–66), Deputy Chief of Naval Staff (1962–65)	
Ian Murray	—	—	June 2019	Head of Australian Defence Staff – Washington (2023–26), Acting Chief of Joint Capabilities (2021–22), Commander Joint Logistics (2019–21)	
Sir Brian Murray	1921	1991	15 November 1975	Deputy Chief of Naval Staff (1975–78)	
Brynmor Mussared	1917	1995	1 March 1971	Third Naval Member and Chief of Naval Technical Services (1972–74), Project Director of the Light Destroyer Project (1971–72)	
George Oldham+	1906	1974	6 July 1962 (Note: Oldham was promoted to acting rear admiral on 20 June 1960 and transferred to the Retired List with the honorary rank of rear admiral on 6 July 1962.)	Flag Officer-in-Charge East Australia Area (1960–62)	
Chris Oxenbould	1946	—	4 December 1993	Deputy Chief of Navy (1997–99), Commander Australian Theatre (1995–97), Maritime Commander Australia (1995–97), Assistant Chief of Naval Staff (Personnel) (1993–95)	
Patrick Perry	1903	1975	18 May 1961	Fourth Naval Member and Chief of Supply (1958–63)	
Nigel Perry	—	—	June 2018	Summary Discipline Implementation Team (2018–2022)	
Tom Phillips*	—	—	December 2024	Head of Nuclear Submarine Capability (2024–)	
Robert Plath	—	—	28 September 2020	Head Recruiting and Retention (2023–24), Commander Defence COVID-19 Taskforce (2021–22), Commander Joint Task Force 629 (2020–21)	
Cuthbert Pope	1887	1959	26 September 1946 (Note: Pope was transferred to the Retired List with the rank of rear admiral on 26 September 1946.)	Flag Officer in Charge New South Wales and Admiral Superintendent – Sydney (1946)	
Denis Pritchard	1895	1955	20 March 1952	Director of Naval Medical Services (1946–55)	
Mark Purcell	—	—	3 December 2012	Head Maritime Systems (2012–16)	(Note: Rear Admiral Mark Purcell is the son of Rear Admiral Peter Purcell.)
Peter Purcell	1942	—	1994	Head Systems Acquisition (Maritime and Ground Systems) (1997–99), Chief Naval Engineer and Assistant Chief of Naval Staff (Materiel) (1994–97)	(Note: Rear Admiral Peter Purcell is the father of Rear Admiral Mark Purcell.)
Frederick Purves	1912	1997	14 March 1967	Third Naval Member and Chief of Naval Technical Services (1967–69)	
Andrew Quinn*	—	—	December 2024	Head Navy Capability (2026–), Head of Space and Cyber Capabilities (2024–26)	
Peter Quinn	—	—	2014	Head Navy Capability (2017–22), Head Force Integration (2014–17)	
Neil Ralph	1932	—	22 April 1985	Deputy Chief of Naval Staff (1985–89)	
Trevor Rapke+	1909	1978	7 May 1964 (Note: Rapke was made an honorary rear admiral on appointment as Judge Advocate General of the Naval Forces on 7 May 1964.)	Judge Advocate General of the Naval Forces (1964–77)	
Maxwell Reed	1922	2017	22 January 1974	Chief of Naval Technical Services (1974–79)	
Katherine Richards	—	—	1 August 2020	Head Navy Engineering (2021–23)	(Note: Rear Admiral Katherine Richards is the daughter of Rear Admiral Geoffrey Bayliss.)
Ian Richards	1930	2022	15 March 1982	Deputy Chief of Naval Staff (1983–84), Chief of Joint Operations (1982–83)	
Andrew Robertson	1925	2020	24 January 1977 (Note: Robertson was promoted acting rear admiral on 27 December 1976; his rank was made substantive on 24 January 1977.)	Flag Officer Naval Support Command (1980–82), Head of Australian Defence Staff – London (1976–79)	
Boyd Robinson	1956	—	June 2007	Head Maritime Systems (2007–09)	
Michael Rothwell	—	—	December 2017	Commander Joint Task Force 633 (2020–21), Head of Information Communications Technology Operations (2017–20)	
William Rourke	1928	2012	26 March 1979	Chief of Naval Materiel (1979–85)	
Alwynne Rowlands	1937	2023	May 1992	Judge Advocate General of the Australian Defence Force (1992–96)	
John Rush*	—	—	31 July 2021	Judge Advocate General of the Australian Defence Force (2021–)	
Trevor Ruting	1952	—	18 February 2004	Head Maritime Systems (2003–07)	
Greg Sammut	1966	—	September 2013	General Manager Submarines (2017–20), Head Future Submarine Program (2013–17)	
Kevin Scarce	1952	—	December 1999	Head Maritime Systems (2000–03), Support Commander Australia – Navy (1999–00)	
Sarah Sharkey	—	—	2 December 2019	Commander Joint Health Command and Surgeon General of the Australian Defence Force (2019–23)	
Graeme Shirtley	1950	2012	9 May 2005	Surgeon General Defence Health Reserves (2008), Surgeon General of the Australian Defence Force (2005–08)	
Henry Showers+	1899	1991	8 February 1955 (Note: Showers was promoted to acting rear admiral on 10 May 1950 and transferred to the Retired List with the honorary rank of rear admiral on 8 February 1955.)		
Peter Sinclair	1934	—	2 July 1984	Deputy Chief of Naval Staff (1989), Maritime Commander Australia (1988–89), Flag Officer Commanding HM Australian Fleet (1987–88), Commandant of the Australian Defence Force Academy (1984–86)	
Michael Slattery	1954	—	July 2014	Judge Advocate General of the Australian Defence Force (2014–21)	
Christopher Smith*	—	—	September 2020	Commander Australian Fleet (2022–), Deputy Chief of Navy (2020–22)	
Geoffrey Smith	1950	—	July 1999	Maritime Commander Australia (2000–02), Deputy Chief of Navy (1999–00)	
Brett Sonter*	—	—	2022	Commander Maritime Border Command and Commander Operation Sovereign Borders (2024–), Deputy Director Maritime Operations, United States Pacific Fleet (2022–23)	
Philip Spedding	—	—	23 November 2020	Head Navy Future Infrastructure (2020–22)	
John Stevens	1927	2015	24 January 1979	Flag Officer Commanding HM Australian Fleet (1981–82), Deputy Chief of Naval Staff (1979–81)	
John Stevenson	1876	1957	7 August 1931 (Note: Stevenson was transferred to the Retired List with the rank of rear admiral on 7 August 1931.)	Captain Superintendent of Naval Establishments and Captain-in-Charge, New South Wales (1929–31)	
Edward Stubington	1941	—	30 December 1990	Assistant Chief of the Defence Force (Personnel) (1992–93), Assistant Chief of Naval Staff (Personnel) (1991–92)	
Rothesay Swan	1926	2025	1 June 1978	Controller of Establishments (1981–83), Director-General of the Natural Disasters Organisation (1978–81)	
Clinton Thomas	1959	—	November 2012	Commander Joint Logistics (2012–16)	
Davyd Thomas	1956	—	July 2005	Deputy Chief of Navy (2008–11), Commander Joint Education, Training and Warfare (2008), Commander Australian Defence College (2007–08), Commander Australian Flett (2007), Maritime Commander Australia (2005–07)	
Frederick Tickell	1857	1919	1 March 1919	Director of Auxiliary Forces (1911–19)	
Brian Treloar	1927	2012	2 April 1981	Director-General Naval Health Services (1981–87)	
Kenneth Urquhart	1905	1974	22 August 1959	Third Naval Member and Chief of Construction (1959–63)	
Michael Uzzell	—	—	22 July 2011	Head Navy Engineering (2011–16)	
Michael van Balen	1961	—	2013	Deputy Chief of Navy (2013–16)	
Kaye Vonthethoff	1930	2020	15 March 1982	Head of Australian Defence Staff – London (1984–86), Flag Officer Naval Support Command (1982–84)	
Robyn Walker	1959	—	14 December 2011	Commander Joint Health and Surgeon General of the Australian Defence Force (2011–15)	
David Wells	1918	1983	31 October 1968 (Note: Wells was promoted acting rear admiral on 4 March 1968; his rank was made substantive from 31 October that year.)	Flag Officer Commanding HM Australian Fleet (1974–75), Commander ANZUK (1971–73), Deputy Chief of Naval Staff (1970–71), Flag Officer-in-Charge East Australia Area (1968–70)	
Barrie West	1934	—	6 May 1985	Chief of Naval Material (1985–89)	
Anita Williams*	—	—	23 July 2026	Commander Australian Fleet (2026–)	
Alan Willis	1926	1997	14 November 1977	Chief of Naval Personnel (1979–80), Chief of Naval Operational Requirements and Plans (1977–79)	(Note: Rear Admiral Alan Willis was the younger brother of Vice Admiral Sir James Willis.)
John Wishart	1892	1968	14 September 1947	Third Naval Member and Chief of Construction (1948–53), Engineer Manager of Garden Island Dockyard (1945–48)	
Brett Wolski	—	—	December 2015	Head of the Afghanistan Inquiry Response Task Force (2021–24), Head Reserve and Youth Division and Commander Australian Defence Force Cadets (2019–21), Head People Capability (2015–19)	
Geoffrey Woolrych	1930	2006	20 February 1981	Flag Officer Commanding HM Australian Fleet (1983–85), Deputy Chief of Naval Staff (1982–83), Chief of Naval Operational Requirements and Plans (1981–82)	

== See also ==
- List of Australian Army generals
- List of Royal Australian Air Force air marshals
