= William Dovers =

William Dovers may refer to:

- William Anthony George Dovers (born 1951), Australian Rear Admiral
- William John Dovers (born 1918), Australian Rear Admiral, Deputy Chief of Navy (Australia) ca. 1973
