= Christopher Smith (admiral) =

Australian naval officer

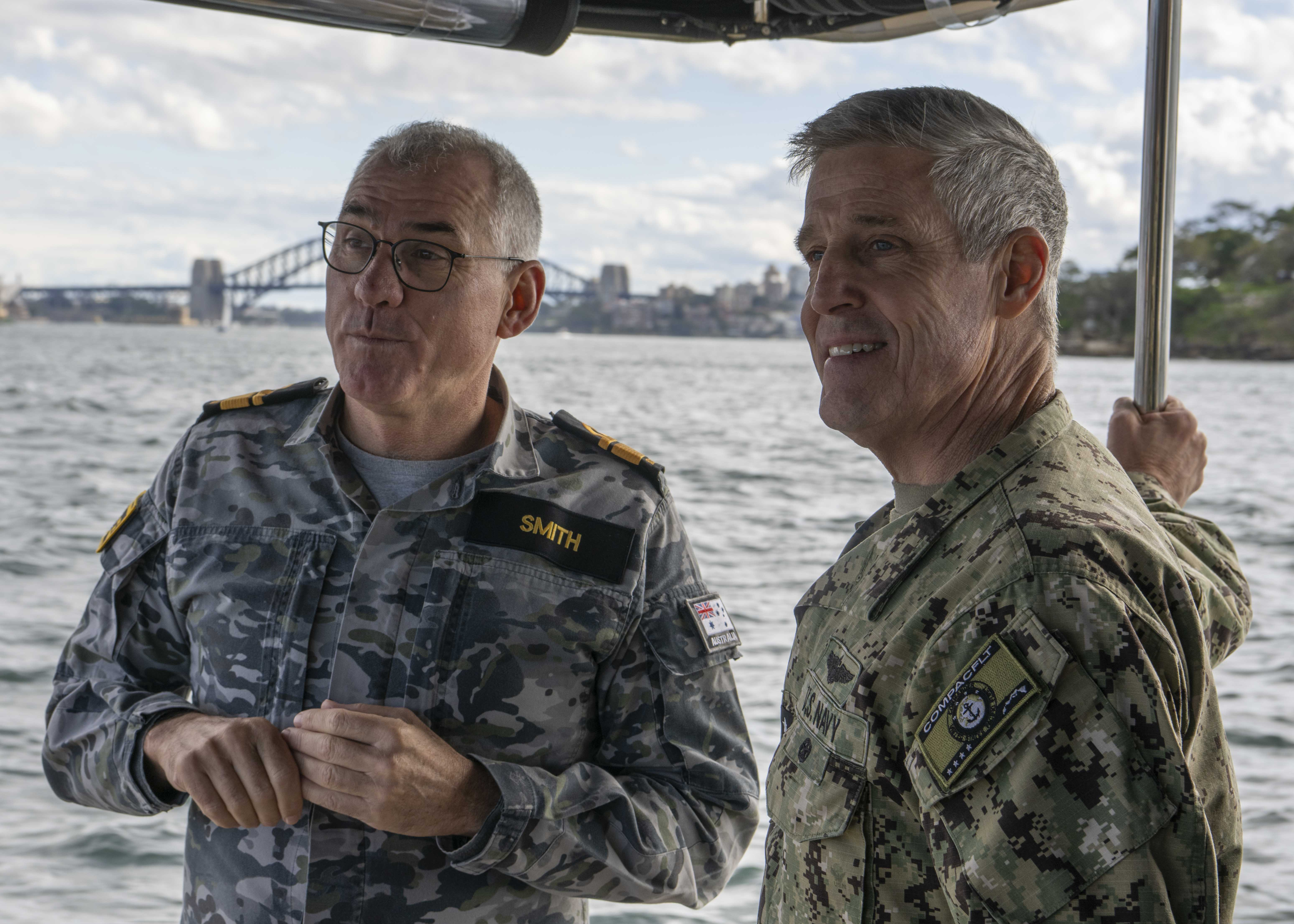
- Smith (left) with Admiral Stephen Koehler of the United States Navy in June 2024
- Military career
- Allegiance: Australia
- Branch: Royal Australian Navy
- Service years: 1989–present
- Rank: Rear Admiral
- Commands: Fleet Command (2022–26); Deputy Chief of Navy (2020–22); Surface Force (2017–19); HMAS Canberra (2015–17); HMAS Darwin (2008–10); HMAS Gladstone (2002–04)
- Conflicts: Operation Helpem Fren; Iraq War
- Awards: Member of the Order of Australia; Conspicuous Service Medal

Rear Admiral Christopher Erson Smith, AM, CSM is a senior officer in the Royal Australian Navy. He has commanded the ships HMAS Gladstone (2002–04), HMAS Darwin (2008–10) and the flagship HMAS Canberra (2015–17), served as Deputy Chief of Navy from September 2020 to December 2022, and was Commander Australian Fleet from December 2022 to August 2026.

== Naval career ==
Smith joined the Royal Australian Navy (RAN) in 1989 as a midshipman at the Royal Australian Naval College, HMAS Creswell. He was awarded the Conspicuous Service Medal in the 2002 Australia Day Honours, and appointed a Member of the Order of Australia in the 2023 Australia Day Honours.

== Honours and awards ==

Member of the Order of Australia Military Division (AM)	As a part of the 2023 Australia Day Honours, Smith was appointed a Member of the Order of Australia.
Conspicuous Service Medal (CSM)	As a part of the 2002 Australia Day Honours, Smith was awarded the Conspicuous Service Medal.
Australian Active Service Medal	
Iraq Medal	
Australian Service Medal	
Australian Operational Service Medal - Border Protection	
Defence Long Service Medal	With 3 rosettes for 30 years service.
Australian Defence Medal	

Military offices
Preceded by Rear Admiral Jonathan Earley	Commander Australian Fleet; 2022–2026	Succeeded by Rear Admiral Anita Williams
Preceded by Rear Admiral Mark Hammond	Deputy Chief of Navy; 2020–2022	Succeeded by Rear Admiral Jonathan Earley
