= John Baker (general) =

Australian Army officer (1936–2007)

John Stuart Baker
- Born: 24 February 1936; Melbourne, Victoria
- Died: 9 July 2007 (aged 71); Canberra, Australian Capital Territory
- Military career
- Allegiance: Australia
- Branch: Australian Army
- Service years: 1954–1998
- Rank: General
- Commands: Chief of the Defence Force (1995–98); Vice Chief of the Defence Force (1992–95); Defence Intelligence Organisation (1990–92); Joint Intelligence Organisation (1989–90)
- Conflicts: Vietnam War
- Awards: Companion of the Order of Australia; Distinguished Service Medal; Mentioned in Despatches; Commander of the Legion of Merit (United States); Commander of the Legion of Honor (Philippines); Distinguished Service Order (Singapore)

General John Stuart Baker AC, DSM, FTSE (24 February 1936 – 9 July 2007) was a senior Australian Army officer. Entering the Royal Military College, Duntroon in 1954, his career culminated with his appointment as Chief of the Defence Force from 1995 to 1998, the most senior position in the Australian Defence Force. Baker also served as the inaugural Director of the Defence Intelligence Organisation from 1990 to 1992, Vice Chief of the Defence Force from 1992 to 1995, and was author of the highly influential 1988 "Baker Report".

== Career ==
Baker entered the Royal Military College, Duntroon in 1954. On graduation in 1957, he was allotted to the Royal Australian Engineers and later completing a degree in civil engineering at the University of Melbourne.

Baker's first regimental posting was a one-year appointment in Papua New Guinea, and not long after he spent a year in Hawaii as an exchange officer. In 1970–1971 he was attached to the 1st Australian Civil Affairs Unit during the Vietnam War, where he was Mentioned in Despatches. He was promoted to lieutenant colonel in 1971, colonel in 1979, brigadier in 1982, major general in 1987, lieutenant general in 1992 and general in 1995.

=== The Baker Report ===
In 1987, the then Chief of the Defence Force, General Peter Gration, tasked the then Brigadier Baker to:

conduct a study of the existing ADF command arrangements in order to recommend further development to meet likely requirements into the 21st century for both low and high levels of operations.

One of the principal aims of this study was to determine the optimal command arrangements for ADF air power. The final report, commonly referred to as the Baker Report, was published in March 1988. Despite extensive reference being made to the command and control challenges posed by air power, Baker did not provide definitive guidance on how the ADF should structure its command arrangements to optimise the development and employment of air power. However, Chapter 7 of the report strongly advocated the creation of NORCOM, a recommendation that was soon adopted by the ADF.

"The Baker Report" remains the seminal work on command and control in the ADF.

== Honours and awards ==

Companion of the Order of Australia (AC)	(1995)
Officer of the Order of Australia (AO)	(1990)
Member of the Order of Australia (AM)	(1980)
Distinguished Service Medal (DSM)	(1998)
Australian Active Service Medal 1945–1975 with clasp	Vietnam
Vietnam Medal with oak leaf for Mention in Despatches	
Australian Service Medal 1945–1975 with clasp	Papua New Guinea
Centenary Medal	(2001)
Defence Force Service Medal with Federation Star (5 clasps)	(40–44 years service)
National Medal with clasp	(1977)
Australian Defence Medal	
Army Commendation Medal (United States)	
Vietnam Campaign Medal (South Vietnam)	
Commander of the Legion of Merit (United States)	
Commander of the Legion of Honor (Philippines)	
Darjah Utama Bakti Cemerlang (Tentera) Distinguished Service Order (Military) (Singapore)	

Baker was a Fellow of the Australian Academy of Technological Sciences and Engineering.

=== Portrait ===
During General Baker's tenure as Chief of Defence Force, the Royal Australian Engineers arranged for his portrait to be painted by leading Australian 20th century artist, Sir William Dargie. The portrait (1997) hangs at the RAE's School of Military Engineering in Sydney, but was also used at General Baker's funeral in Canberra at the Royal Military College, Duntroon in 2007.

=== General John Baker Complex – HQJOC ===
On 7 March 2009 the Prime Minister of Australia, Kevin Rudd, officially opened the "General John Baker Complex", housing the Headquarters Joint Operations Command (HQJOC) from which joint command of the Australian Defence Force is exercised by the Chief of Joint Operations (CJOPS). The complex is some 25 km from the national capital, Canberra, on the Kings Highway about half-way between the towns of Queanbeyan and Bungendore. After Mr Rudd named the complex, Mrs Margaret Baker unveiled a bronze bust of General Baker. The bust was sculpted by Hal Holman.

Military offices
Preceded by Admiral Alan Beaumont	Chief of the Defence Force; 1995–1998	Succeeded by Admiral Chris Barrie
Preceded by Vice Admiral Alan Beaumont	Vice Chief of the Defence Force; 1992–1995	Succeeded by Vice Admiral Robert Walls
New office	Director of the Defence Intelligence Organisation; 1990–1992	Succeeded by Major General John Hartley
Preceded by Paul Dibb	Director of the Joint Intelligence Organisation; 1989–1990	Office replaced by Director of the Defence Intelligence Organisation
