= Chris Barrie (admiral) =

Australian naval officer, Chief of the Defence Force

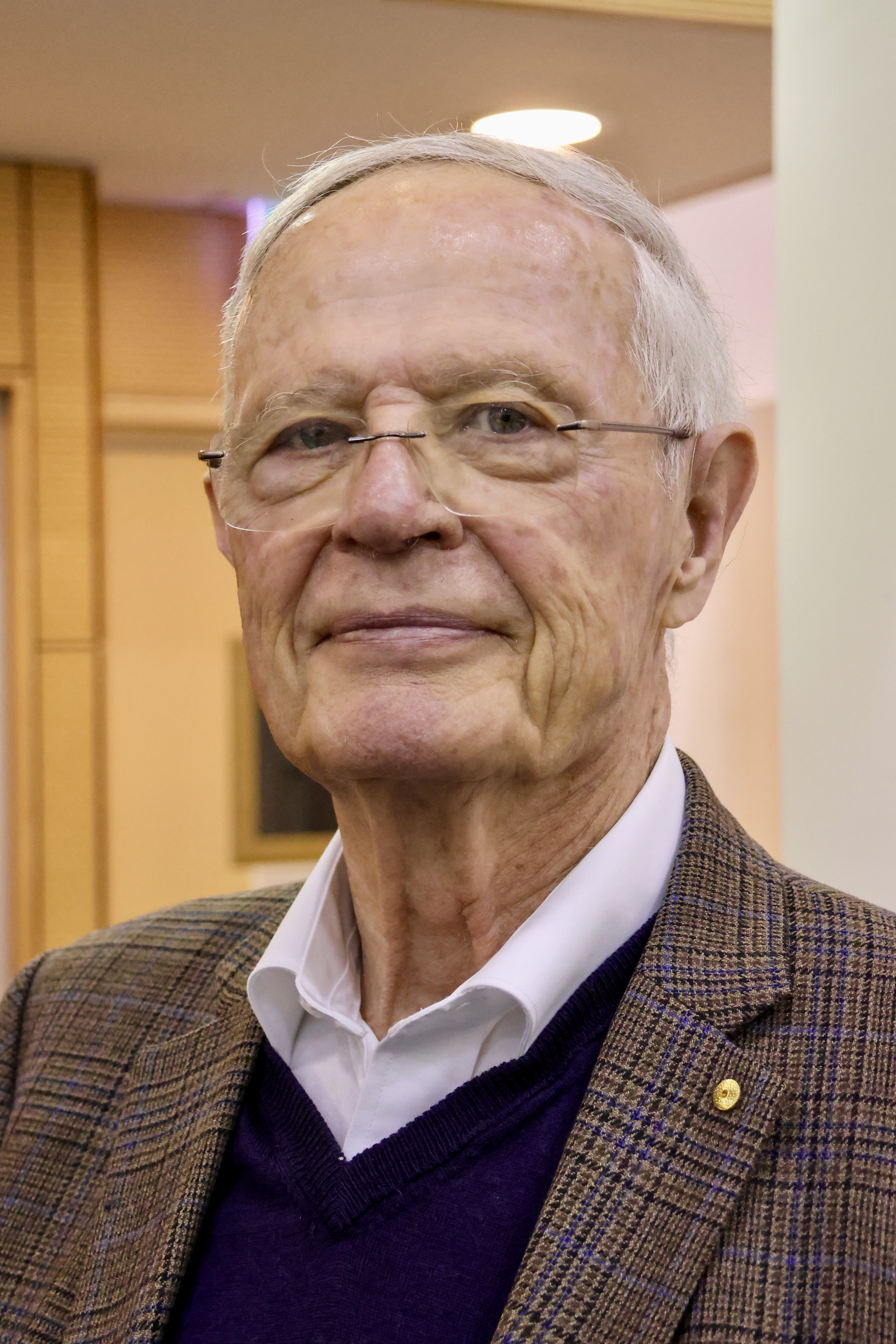
- Barrie in 2026
- Born: 29 May 1945 (age 81); Marrickville, New South Wales
- Military career
- Allegiance: Australia
- Branch: Royal Australian Navy
- Service years: 1961–2002
- Rank: Admiral
- Commands: Chief of the Defence Force (1998–02); Vice Chief of the Defence Force (1997–98); Deputy Chief of Navy (1995–97); HMAS Watson (1991–92); HMAS Stuart (1983–84); HMAS Buccaneer (1969–70)
- Conflicts: Indonesia–Malaysia confrontation Vietnam War
- Awards: Companion of the Order of Australia; Distinguished Service Order (Military) (Singapore); Commander of the Legion of Merit (United States)

Admiral Christopher Alexander Barrie, AC (born 29 May 1945) is a retired senior officer of the Royal Australian Navy, who served as Chief of the Defence Force from 4 July 1998 to 3 July 2002.

== Early life ==
Barrie was born in the Sydney suburb of Marrickville, New South Wales, on 29 May 1945 to Alexander William Barrie and Dorothy Clare Chrystal. He was educated at North Sydney Boys High School, and entered the Royal Australian Naval College as a cadet midshipman in 1961.

== Naval career ==
During his early naval training, Barrie completed service on HMA Ships Anzac, Vampire and Melbourne, which included service in the Indonesia–Malaysia confrontation, and a 23-day tour of duty in Vietnam. Postings to the Britannia Royal Naval College at Dartmouth and HMS Excellent followed.

Barrie served at sea as part of the commissioning crew of HMAS Brisbane, which included a seven-month tour of duty in Vietnam, during 1969. He also served as Commanding Officer of HMAS Buccaneer from 1969 to 1970, Operations and Navigating Officer on HMS Eastbourne, HMAS Perth and HMAS Duchess, Executive Officer on HMAS Vampire, and later as Commanding Officer of HMAS Stuart from 1983 to 1984.

In 1990 to 1991, Barrie held an appointment as Defence Adviser, New Delhi, India. Following this post, he was promoted to commodore and served as Director RAN Surface Warfare School and Commanding Officer of HMAS Watson from 1991 to 1992. He was appointed Deputy Maritime Commander and Chief of Staff at Maritime Headquarters in Sydney from 1992 to 1995, for which he was appointed a Member of the Order of Australia in 1994. On promotion to rear admiral, Barrie served as Deputy Chief of Naval Staff, before being appointed Vice Chief of the Defence Force with the rank of vice admiral in March 1997. The following year, Barrie was advanced to Officer of the Order of Australia in recognition of his "distinguished service" in the latter two postings.

Barrie was promoted to admiral, and assumed the post of Chief of the Defence Force (CDF) on 4 July 1998. He held this position until his retirement, and for his "eminent service to the Australian Defence Force" was further advanced to Companion of the Order of Australia in 2001 and awarded the Distinguished Service Order (Military) by the government of Singapore. As CDF, Barrie became involved in the "Children Overboard Affair" of 2001, a high-level political controversy which occurred during the Australian federal election campaign. Barrie was the last Australian Government official to publicly support Prime Minister John Howard's assertion that refugees had thrown their children overboard from their sinking vessel. Barrie retired on 3 July 2002, and was succeeded as CDF by General Peter Cosgrove.

A graduate of the Britannia Royal Naval College, Barrie completed through part-time study a Bachelor of Arts with majors in International Relations and Politics in 1983 and was conferred a Master of Business Administration in 1996 by Deakin University. He was made a Commander of the Legion of Merit by the United States in 2003.

Military offices
Preceded by General John Baker	Chief of the Defence Force; 1998–2002	Succeeded by General Peter Cosgrove
Preceded by Vice Admiral Robert Walls	Vice Chief of the Defence Force; 1997–1998	Succeeded by Air Marshal Douglas Riding
Preceded by Rear Admiral David Campbell	Deputy Chief of Naval Staff; 1995–1997	Succeeded by Rear Admiral Chris Oxenbould
