= Vice Chief of the Defence Force (Australia) =

Military deputy to the Chief of the Defence Force of Australia

Vice Chief of the Australian Defence Force

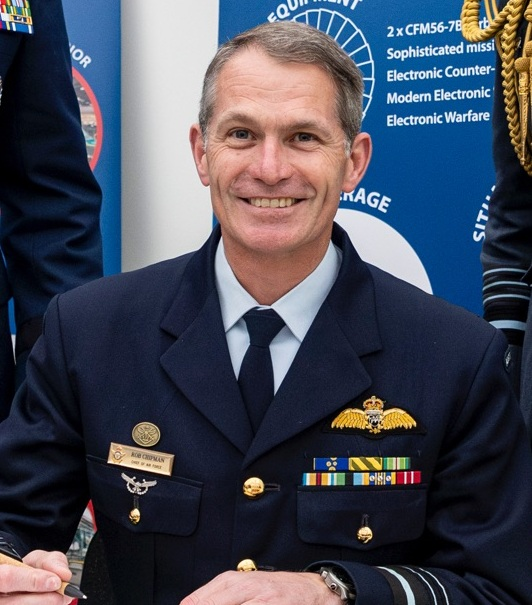
- Incumbent; Robert Chipman since 9 July 2024
- Style: Vice Admiral; Lieutenant General; Air Marshal
- Member of: Australian Defence Force
- Reports to: Chief of the Defence Force
- Term length: Four years (renewable)
- Formation: 6 June 1986
- First holder: Air Marshal Ray Funnell

The vice chief of the Defence Force (VCDF) is the military deputy to the chief of the Defence Force (CDF) of Australia, and acts as the CDF in his absence under standing acting arrangements. Air Marshal Robert Chipman, the incumbent VCDF, has held the position since 9 July 2024.

== Responsibilities ==
Created in 1986, the VCDF is a three-star officer in the Australian Defence Force (lieutenant general, vice admiral, or air marshal). The position's standing responsibilities include: joint doctrine, education, training and evaluation; joint logistics; reserve policy; and joint capabilities, commitments and concepts. When acting as chief of the Defence Force, the VCDF attends the National Security Committee of Cabinet (NSCC) and secretary’s Committee on National Security (SCNS).

Until September 2007, the VCDF was "double hatted" as the chief of joint operations (CJOPS). In this role he commanded Australian Defence Force operations on behalf of the chief of the Defence Force. In September 2007, the minister of defence, Brendan Nelson announced the formation of a separate three-star CJOPS position based at the Headquarters Joint Operations Command (HQJOC) facility at Bungendore, New South Wales.

== Appointment ==
The appointment is made by the governor general on the advice of his/her ministers under Section 9AA of the Defence Act (1903) and is for a fixed term of four years, nominally rotated between the three services, Navy, Army and Air Force; however in practice this has not been the case and the appointment has been held for longer or shorter periods of time. The role is politically neutral, as are all military positions, and is not affected by a change of government.

== VCDF Group ==
The vice chief of the Defence Force Group is responsible for the provision of military strategic effects and commitments advice and planning, joint military professional education and training, logistics support, health support, ADF cadet and reserve policy, joint capability coordination, preparedness management, and joint and combined ADF doctrine.

The Military Strategic Commitments Division (MSCD) provides and coordinates ADF tri-service and joint strategic advice across the Australian Government (including the Headquarters Joint Operations Command and the Defence Strategic Policy and Intelligence Group) and situational awareness for current and potential ADF commitments. The Head Military Strategic Commitments is also responsible for the Australian Defence Force Investigative Service, strategic communications, strategic crisis response, the Australian Defence Force Parliamentary Program, and engagement with the United Nations and other coalition partners.

The Military Strategic Plans Division (MSPD) provides strategic planning linking policy and operational arrangements.

The Force Integration Division (FID) is responsible for the design, development, integration and coordination of ADF joint warfare capabilities, including information systems, effects-based operations, and counter-IED efforts.

The Force Design Division is responsible for the provision of guidance and planning for future joint force design, requirements, and capabilities of the ADF.

== Appointees ==
The following list chronologically records those who have held the post of vice chief of the Defence Force. Rank and honours are as at the completion of the individual's term.

No.	Portrait	Name	Took office	Left office	Time in office	Defence branch
1	Ray Funnell AO	Air Marshal; Ray Funnell AO (born 1935)	6 June 1986	July 1987	1 year, 25 days	RAAF
2	Ian Knox AC	Vice Admiral; Ian Knox AC (1933–2024)	July 1987	16 September 1989	2 years, 77 days	RAN
3	Alan Beaumont AC	Vice Admiral; Alan Beaumont AC (1934–2004)	16 September 1989	October 1992	3 years, 15 days	RAN
4	John Baker AC	Lieutenant General; John Baker AC (1936–2007)	October 1992	April 1995	2 years, 182 days	Army
5	Robert Walls AO	Vice Admiral; Robert Walls AO (born 1941)	April 1995	March 1997	1 year, 334 days	RAN
6	Chris Barrie AC	Vice Admiral; Chris Barrie AC (born 1945)	March 1997	3 July 1998	1 year, 124 days	RAN
7	Douglas Riding AO, DFC	Air Marshal; Douglas Riding AO, DFC (born 1943)	3 July 1998	5 June 2000	1 year, 338 days	RAAF
8	Desmond Mueller AO	Lieutenant General; Desmond Mueller AO (born 1943)	5 June 2000	15 July 2002	2 years, 40 days	Army
9	Russ Shalders AO, CSC	Vice Admiral; Russ Shalders AO, CSC (born 1951)	15 July 2002	4 July 2005	2 years, 354 days	RAN
10	Ken Gillespie AO, DSC, CSM	Lieutenant General; Ken Gillespie AO, DSC, CSM (born 1952)	4 July 2005	3 July 2008	2 years, 365 days	Army
11	David Hurley AC, DSC	Lieutenant General; David Hurley AC, DSC (born 1953)	3 July 2008	3 July 2011	3 years, 0 days	Army
12	Mark Binskin AC	Air Marshal; Mark Binskin AC (born 1960)	3 July 2011	30 June 2014	2 years, 362 days	RAAF
13	Ray Griggs AO, CSC	Vice Admiral; Ray Griggs AO, CSC (born 1961)	30 June 2014	5 July 2018	4 years, 5 days	RAN
14	David Johnston AC	Vice Admiral; David Johnston AC (born 1962)	5 July 2018	9 July 2024	6 years, 4 days	RAN
15	Robert Chipman AO, CSC	Air Marshal; Robert Chipman AO, CSC (born 1971)	9 July 2024	Incumbent	2 years, 61 days	RAAF
