= Deputy Chief of Navy (Australia) =

Deputy head of the Royal Australian Navy

Deputy Chief of the Royal Australian Navy
- Incumbent; Rear Admiral Darren Grogan since 4 June 2026
- Style: Rear Admiral
- Abbreviation: DCN
- Member of: Royal Australian Navy
- Reports to: Chief of Navy
- Website: Official website

The Deputy Chief of Navy (DCN) is the second most senior appointment in the Royal Australian Navy, responsible to the Chief of Navy (CN). The rank associated with the position is rear admiral (2-star).

== Appointees ==
The following list chronologically records those who have held the post of Deputy Chief of Navy or its preceding positions. Rank and honours are as at the completion of the individual's tours.

Rank	Name	Postnominal(s)	Term began	Term ended	Notes
Deputy Chief of Naval Staff
Captain	Frank Getting		1940	1942	
Captain	Roy Dowling		September 1943	1944	
Captain	David Harries		1944	1945	
Captain	Herbert Buchanan	DSO	October 1945	1946	
Captain	Henry Burrell		October 1946	October 1948	
Captain	Galfry Gatacre	DSC & Bar	October 1948	1951	
Captain	Alan McNicoll	GM	October 1951	1952	
Captain	Otto Becher	DSO, DSC & Bar	1952	1954	
Captain	Henry Burrell		1954	1954	
Rear Admiral	Jack Mesley	LVO, DSC	1955	1957	
Rear Admiral	Galfry Gatacre	DSO, DSC & Bar	January 1957	January 1959	
Rear Admiral	Otto Becher	CBE, DSO, DSC & Bar	January 1959	1962	
Rear Admiral	Thomas Morrison	CBE, DSC	1962	1964	
Rear Admiral	Richard Peek	OBE, DSC	1965	1967	
Rear Admiral	Victor Smith	CBE, DSC	1967	April 1968	
Rear Admiral	David Stevenson	CBE	1968	1970	
Rear Admiral	David Wells	CBE	1970	1971	
Rear Admiral	Anthony Synnot	CBE	1972	1973	
Rear Admiral	William Dovers	CBE, DSC	1973	1975	
Rear Admiral	Geoffrey Gladstone	AO, DSC & Bar	1974	1975	
Rear Admiral	Brian Murray		1975	1978	
Rear Admiral	Neil McDonald	AO	1978	1979	
Rear Admiral	John Stevens		1979	1981	
Rear Admiral	Peter Doyle	AO, OBE	1981	1982	
Rear Admiral	Geoffrey Woolrych	AO	1982	1983	
Rear Admiral	Ian Richards	AO	1983	1984	
Rear Admiral	Ian Knox		1984	1984	
Rear Admiral	Neil Ralph	AO, DSC	1985	1989	
Rear Admiral	Peter Sinclair	AO	1989	1989	
Rear Admiral	Ken Doolan		1989	1990	
Rear Admiral	Ian MacDougall		July 1990	March 1991	
Rear Admiral	Robert Walls	AM	1991	1991	
Rear Admiral	Rodney Taylor	AO	November 1991	1994	
Rear Admiral	David Campbell	AM	1994	1995	
Rear Admiral	Chris Barrie	AO	May 1996	June 1997	
Deputy Chief of Navy
Rear Admiral	Chris Oxenbould	AO	1997	1999	
Rear Admiral	Chris Ritchie	AO	1999	1999	
Rear Admiral	Geoffrey Smith	AM	1999	2000	
Rear Admiral	Brian Adams	AM	June 2000	June 2002	
Rear Admiral	Rowan Moffitt	AM	June 2002	June 2004	
Rear Admiral	Max Hancock	AM	June 2004	June 2006	
Rear Admiral	Russ Crane	AM, CSM	June 2006	June 2008	
Rear Admiral	Davyd Thomas	AO, CSC	June 2008	February 2011	
Rear Admiral	Trevor Jones	AM, CSC	February 2011	2013	
Rear Admiral	Michael van Balen	AO	2013	28 January 2016	
Rear Admiral	Michael Noonan	AM	28 January 2016	23 March 2018	
Rear Admiral	Mark Hammond	AM	23 March 2018	11 September 2020	
Rear Admiral	Christopher Smith	CSM	11 September 2020	16 December 2022	
Rear Admiral	Jonathan Earley	CSC	16 December 2022	28 June 2024	
Commodore	Eric Young	CSC	28 June 2024	24 January 2025	(Acting)
Rear Admiral	Matt Buckley	AM, CSC	24 January 2025	4 June 2026	
Rear Admiral	Darren Grogan	CSM	4 June 2026	Incumbent	
