= William Clarkson =

Royal Australian Navy commander

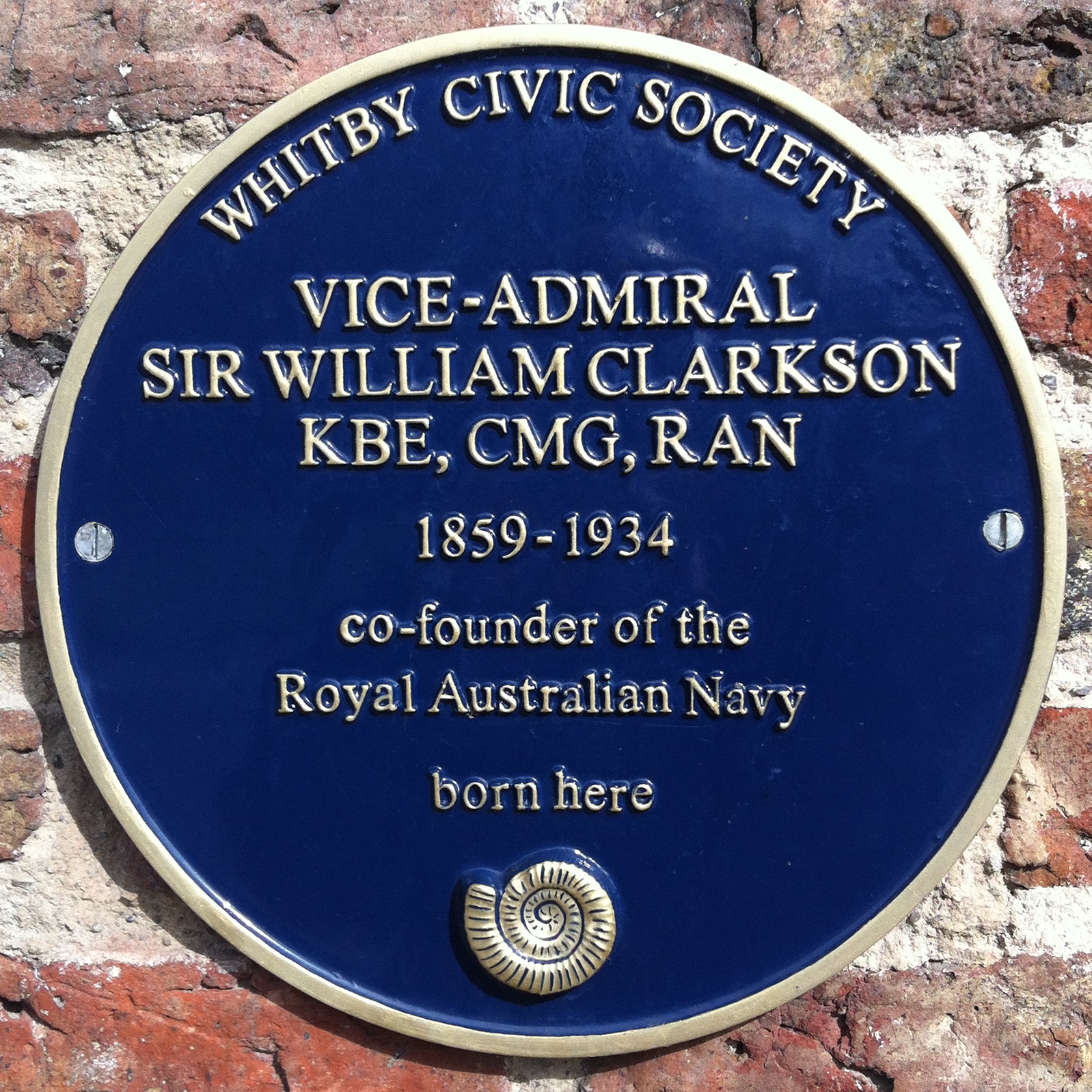
- Blue plaque at Clarkson's birth place.
- Born: 26 March 1859; 10 St Hilda's Terrace, Whitby, North Yorkshire, England
- Died: 21 January 1934 (aged 74); Darling Point, Sydney, Australia
- Burial place: Church of Saint Mary, Whitby, North Yorkshire, England; 54°29′20″N 0°36′34″W
- Spouse: Louisa Clarissa Hawker
- Military career
- Allegiance: Australia
- Branch: South Australian Naval Service; Commonwealth Naval Forces; Royal Australian Navy
- Service years: 1884–1923
- Rank: Vice Admiral
- Conflicts: Boxer Rebellion
- Awards: Knight Commander of the Order of the British Empire; Companion of the Order of St Michael and St George
- Memorials: Clarkson Street, Canberra, Australia
- Other work: Chairman of Commonwealth Shipping Board

Vice Admiral Sir William Clarkson, KBE, CMG (26 March 1859 – 21 January 1934) is regarded as the co-founder of the Royal Australian Navy (RAN), in which he served as a senior commander.

== Early life ==
Born in Whitby, North Yorkshire, to James, a draper, and his wife Mary (née Dixon). Clarkson was privately educated in the town. Later he was articled into shipbuilding in Newcastle upon Tyne for R. & W. Hawthorn. In his time at the company he became a marine engineer.

== South Australian Naval Service ==
Clarkson joined the South Australian Naval Service as an Engineer Lieutenant in May 1884, travelling to Australian in HMAS Protector. It was in this time that he served under Captain William Creswell (Later Vice Admiral and Commander of Commonwealth Naval Forces) who shared his interest of creating a united Australian Navy.

He was Chief engineer aboard Protector in the Boxer Rebellion in 1900–01, which carried despatches in the conflict.

== Commonwealth Naval Forces ==
Following the Boxer Rebellion, Clarkson transferred to the Commonwealth Naval Forces upon the Federation of Australia.

In October 1905 Clarkson was promoted to Engineer Commander.

On 27 March 1907 he was selected to visit Japan, the United States, Canada and the United Kingdom in order to study Naval dockyards, ship construction and training methods. In this period he oversaw the building of destroyers for the CNF, which would become the first ships of the newly founded Royal Australian Navy.

== Royal Australian Navy ==
Upon the founding of the RAN in 1911, Clarkson became the third member of the Australian Commonwealth Naval Board, joining Creswell and Captain Gordon Smith. Subsequently, the decision was made to build a naval base at Western Port and Clarkson was a driving force in its creation. Work on Flinders Naval Base started in 1913 and was opened in 1920, for the purpose of training. In 1913 he was made a Companion of the Order of St Michael and St George.

He was promoted to Rear Admiral on 1 April 1916. At the outbreak of World War I he became the Director of Transports and Controller of Shipping. By 1918 he was regarded as "without peer in Australian maritime affairs". Upon the formation of the Inter-State Central Committee he became Chairman and Controller of coastal shipping. For his duties in this capacity, in 1919 he was made a Knight Commander of the Order of the British Empire. The citation reads

Rear-Admiral William Clarkson, CMG, RAN, for services in connection with the control and reorganisation of coastal shipping.

He was promoted to vice admiral on 1 November 1922 and transferred to the retired list.

== Commonwealth Shipping Board ==
In 1923, he was appointed director of the Commonwealth Shipping Board.

== Death ==
He died of heart disease at the family home in Darling Point, Sydney, Australia on 21 Jan 1934. He was cremated at the Rookwood Crematorium and a funeral with full military honours was held. His ashes were then transported back to his hometown, where they were interred in the family memorial at the Church of Saint Mary, Whitby.
