= Douglas Riding =

Douglas John Stuart Riding
- Born: 6 May 1943 (age 83); Burwood, New South Wales
- Military career
- Allegiance: Australia
- Branch: Royal Australian Air Force
- Service years: 1962–2000
- Rank: Air Marshal
- Commands: Vice Chief of the Defence Force (1998–00); RAAF Base East Sale (1987–90)
- Conflicts: Vietnam War
- Awards: Officer of the Order of Australia; Distinguished Flying Cross; Air Medal (United States)

Air Marshal Douglas John Stuart Riding, AO, DFC (born 6 May 1943) is a retired senior Royal Australian Air Force commander and a former Vice Chief of the Defence Force.

Riding was born in the Sydney suburb of Burwood, New South Wales, on 6 May 1943. Following a secondary education at Manly Boys High School, he joined the Royal Australian Air Force (RAAF) in June 1962 as an aircrew cadet, and graduated as a pilot the following year. He was posted for operational service during the Vietnam War for a tour from April to December 1969 with the United States Air Force's 19th Tactical Air Support Squadron. As a result of his "gallant services in Vietnam", Riding was awarded the Distinguished Flying Cross.

Riding was Officer Commanding RAAF Base East Sale from 1987 to 1990. During the 1990s, he held senior positions in the RAAF: Director-General Programs & Resource Management 1990–93; Director-General Defence Force Plans & Programs 1994–95; Assistant Chief of Air Staff (Materiel) 1995–97. In July 1998 he was appointed Vice Chief of the Defence Force (VCDF). He retired from the RAAF in June 2000 at the end of his term as VCDF. He was appointed an Officer of the Order of Australia in 2000.

In November 2000 Riding was appointed a non-executive Director of BAE Systems Australia.

Military offices
Preceded by Vice Admiral Chris Barrie	Vice Chief of the Defence Force; 1998–2000	Succeeded by Lieutenant General Desmond Mueller
