= Desmond Mueller =

Australian Army officer

Desmond Maurice Mueller
- Born: 25 July 1943 (age 83); Adelaide, South Australia
- Military career
- Allegiance: Australia
- Branch: Australian Army
- Service years: 1964–2002
- Rank: Lieutenant General
- Nickname: Des
- Commands: Vice Chief of the Defence Force; Support Command Australia; Logistics Command (Army)
- Awards: Officer of the Order of Australia

Lieutenant General Desmond Maurice "Des" Mueller AO (born 25 July 1943) is a retired senior officer of the Australian Army. He served as Vice Chief of the Defence Force from June 2000 until his retirement in July 2002.

Mueller was born in Adelaide and enrolled in the Royal Military College, Duntroon in 1961, graduating in 1964. He served with the 28th Commonwealth Infantry Brigade in Malaysia from 1965 to 1967. Following a gunnery staff course at the School of Artillery in the United Kingdom he held various appointments as Instructor-in-Gunnery, Adjutant, Battery Commander and Commanding Officer of the School of Artillery.

In 1989 Mueller was promoted to brigadier and became Director General of Army Development. In 1990 he became the Director General Force Development (Land), responsibility for the development of land forces capability. In 1994, he was promoted to major general and appointed General Officer Commanding Logistic Command. Following the merger of logistics management for all three services (Navy, Army and Air Force), Mueller was appointed the first Commander Support Australia. In 2000, he was promoted to lieutenant general and became the Vice Chief of the Defence Force.

Mueller was awarded Member of the Order of Australia (AM) in 1993, and was elevated to Officer of the Order of Australia (AO) in 1998.

Following retirement from the Army, Mueller continued a career in consulting, management and academia, serving as an adjunct professor at Monash and Latrobe universities.

Military offices
Preceded by Air Marshal Douglas Riding	Vice Chief of the Defence Force; 2000–2002	Succeeded by Vice Admiral Russ Shalders
