= Jonathan Earley =

Australian naval officer

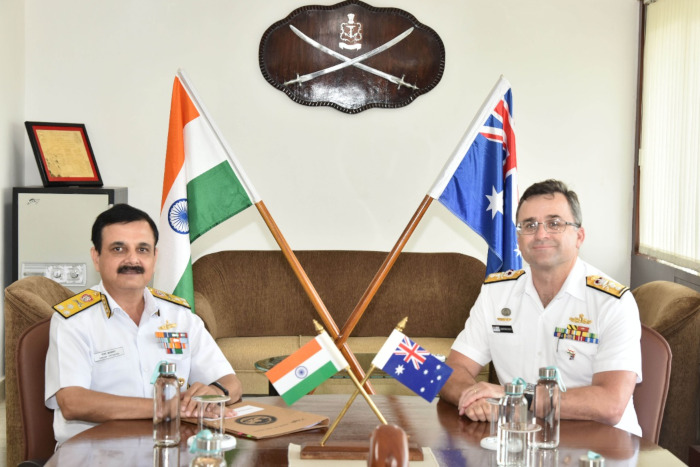
- Earley (right) with Vice Admiral Sanjay Vatsayan of the Indian Navy in November 2022
- Born: Perth, Western Australia
- Military career
- Allegiance: Australia
- Branch: Royal Australian Navy
- Service years: 1990–present
- Rank: Rear Admiral
- Commands: Head Military Strategic Commitments (2024–); Deputy Chief of Navy (2022–24); Fleet Command (2022); HMAS Adelaide (2017–18); HMAS Ballarat (2011–12)
- Conflicts: War in Afghanistan; Iraq War
- Awards: Officer of the Order of Australia; Conspicuous Service Cross; Commendation for Distinguished Service

Rear Admiral Jonathan Paul Earley, AO, CSC is a senior officer in the Royal Australian Navy (RAN). He joined the RAN as a maritime warfare officer in January 1990, and has commanded HMAS Ballarat (2011–12) and HMAS Adelaide (2017–18). He served as Commander Australian Fleet from June to December 2022 and Deputy Chief of Navy from December 2022 to July 2024, before being appointed as Head Military Strategic Commitments.

== Naval career ==
Earley joined the Royal Australian Navy (RAN) as a midshipman Maritime Warfare Officer in 1990. Following his initial training at the Australian Defence Force Academy and HMAS Creswell, he completed his employment and warfare training at HMAS Watson and trained on RAN and Royal Canadian Navy Warships respectively, before specialising as an Air Warfare Officer.

In 2005 Earley was appointed executive officer of HMAS Ballarat. Several shore postings followed, before serving as the executive office of HMAS Ballarat, following this he was awarded the Commendation for Distinguished Service as part of the 2007 Queen's Birthday Honours for “distinguished service as the Executive Officer of HMAS BALLARAT during the ship's deployment to Operation Catalyst from March to September 2006.” He was then appointed commanding officer of HMAS Ballarat in 2011. He served as the inaugural executive officer of HMAS Canberra from 2013, after which he moved to Canberra as Director of Maritime Operations. He was awarded the Conspicuous Service Cross as part of the 2017 Australia Day Honours for “outstanding achievement and devotion to duty in maritime operational and humanitarian response planning and deployment.” In 2017 he returned to sea on being appointed as commanding officer of HMAS Adelaide. From 2018 to 2021 Earley served in various staff roles at the operational and strategic levels.

In 2021, Earley was posted to Fleet Command and assumed the role of Deputy Fleet Commander. In June 2022, he was appointed Commander Australian Fleet. Six months later, on 16 December, Earley swapped positions with Rear Admiral Christopher Smith and was appointed Deputy Chief of Navy. He was next appointed as Head Military Strategic Commitments in July 2024.

Earley was appointed Officer of the Order of Australia in the 2025 Australia Day Honours.

On 8 March 2025, Early was appointed the commander of the Australian Defence Force response to Tropical Cyclone Alfred, which hit South East Queensland and New South Wales North Coast as a category 2 system.

Military offices
Preceded by Air Vice-Marshal Stephen Chappell	Head Military Strategic Commitments; 2024–present	Incumbent
Preceded by Rear Admiral Christopher Smith	Deputy Chief of Navy; 2022–2024	Succeeded by Commodore Eric Young (Acting)
Preceded by Rear Admiral Mark Hammond	Commander Australian Fleet; June–December 2022	Succeeded by Rear Admiral Christopher Smith
