= Mark Hammond (admiral) =

Royal Australian Navy officer

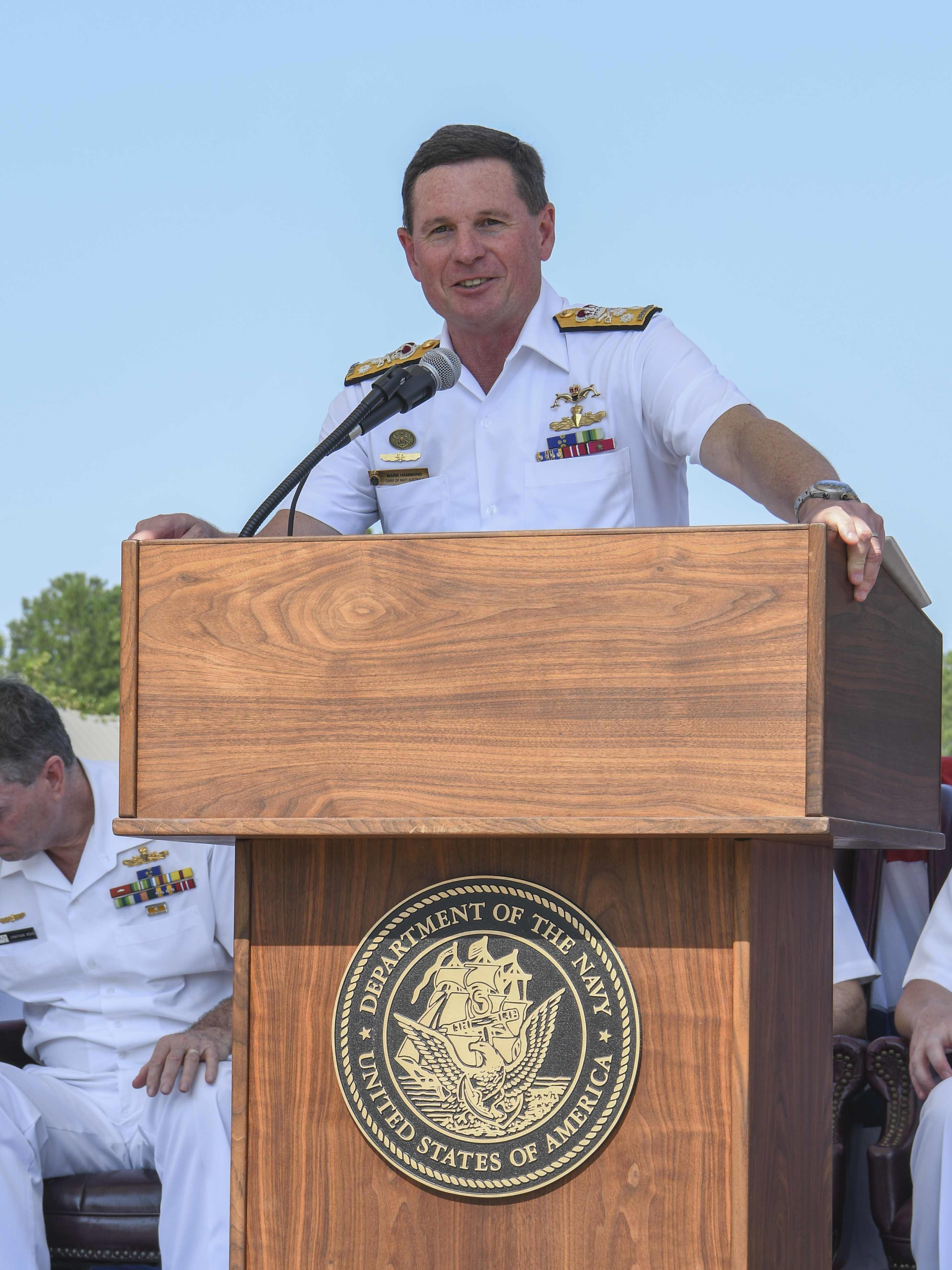
- Vice Admiral Mark Hammond in 2023
- Military career
- Allegiance: Australia
- Branch: Royal Australian Navy
- Service years: 1986–present
- Rank: Admiral
- Commands: Chief of the Defence Force (2026–); Chief of Navy (2022–26); Fleet Command (2020–22); Deputy Chief of Navy (2018–20); HMAS Farncomb (c. 2005–07)
- Awards: Officer of the Order of Australia; Officer of the Legion of Merit (United States); Order of National Security Merit, 2nd Class (South Korea); Meritorious Service Medal (Singapore)

Admiral Mark David Hammond AO is a senior officer in the Royal Australian Navy (RAN), who has served as Chief of the Defence Force since 9 July 2026. He joined the RAN as an electronics technician in 1986 and, after being accepted for officer training, graduated from the Australian Defence Force Academy in 1990. Much of Hammond's career has been spent in the Submarine Service. He has served on operations in the Indo-Pacific, commanded the Collins-class submarine HMAS Farncomb, was Deputy Chief of Navy from 2018 to 2020, and served as Commander Australian Fleet from November 2020 to June 2022. He was Chief of Navy from July 2022 to July 2026, when he was appointed Chief of the Defence Force.

== Naval career ==
Hammond joined the Royal Australian Navy (RAN) in 1986 as a junior sailor electronics technician and attended recruit school at HMAS Cerberus. He was later accepted for officer training and, commissioned a midshipman, entered the Australian Defence Force Academy in 1988. Graduating from the academy with a Bachelor of Science in 1990, he was promoted sub-lieutenant and completed seamanship and navigation training before volunteering for the RAN Submarine Service. He qualified on submarines in 1994 and was appointed navigating officer in HMAS Collins in 1996. He then became flag lieutenant to the Chief of Navy and, in 1998, completed the Principal Warfare Officer's Course and Submarine Warfare Course. He was appointed to the commissioning crew of HMAS Waller as operations officer in 1999, returned to the Submarine Warfare Course as an instructor in 2001, and was made executive officer in HMAS Sheean.

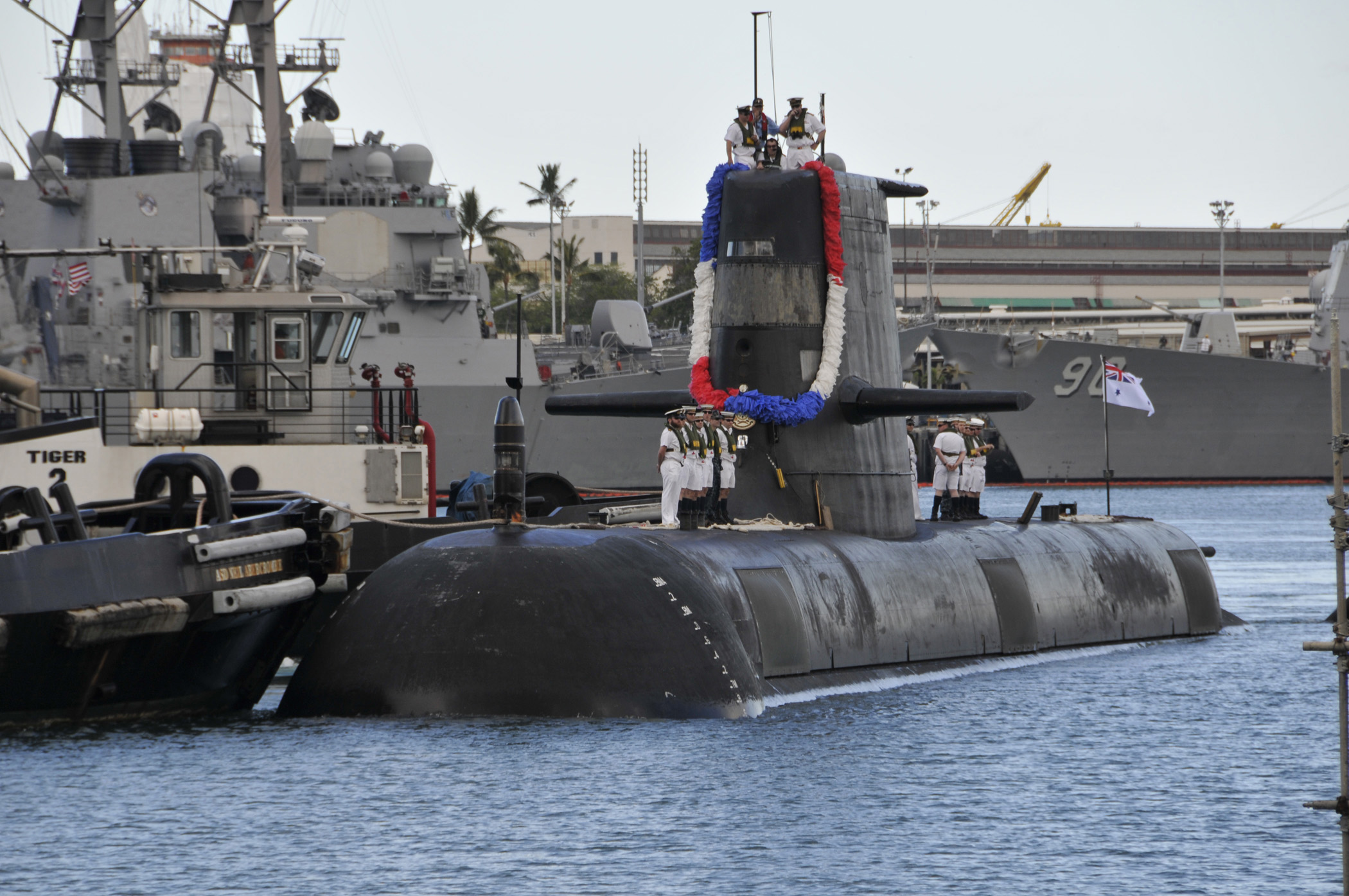
The submarine HMAS Farncomb, which Hammond commanded from c. 2005 to 2007.

In 2003, after completing the Dutch Submarine Command Course and the Prospective Commanding Officer Course with the United States Navy, Hammond was posted to RAN Headquarters as Staff Officer Future Concepts. He attended the Australian Command and Staff College the following year, graduating with a Master of Management in Defence Studies from the affiliated University of Canberra. He also gained a Master of Maritime Studies from the University of Wollongong in 2005, served on an operational exchange posting with the Royal Navy Submarine Service and, following his return to Australia, was appointed commanding officer of HMAS Farncomb. In Farncomb, Hammond undertook "two years of demanding operations in the Indo Pacific region".

Following his period of command, Hammond was posted as Assistant Naval Attaché in Washington, D.C. He returned to Australia as Director Future Submarines – Operational Requirements, before being posted to Joint Operations Command as Joint Exercise Director (J75). He subsequently became Director Submarine Sub-Program (Collins and Future Submarines) and, in November 2012, was appointed chief of staff to the Chief of the Defence Force, General David Hurley. Hammond relinquished the post in December 2013 and, in 2014, was made Director General Maritime Operations.

Hammond was posted to the United States in 2017 as the Chief of the Defence Force Liaison Officer to the Chairman of the Joint Chiefs of Staff, then General Joseph Dunford. The following January, as part of the 2018 Australia Day Honours, Hammond was appointed a Member of the Order of Australia for his "exceptional service to the Australian Defence Force in senior command and staff roles". The citation for the award, in particular, praised his "demonstrated exceptional professionalism, leadership and dedication" and described Hammond as a "highly accomplished submarine commander". Hammond returned to Australia that March as Deputy Chief of Navy. After two and a half years in the role, he relinquished responsibility to Rear Admiral Christopher Smith in September 2020 and, on 17 November, succeeded Rear Admiral Jonathan Mead as Commander Australian Fleet.

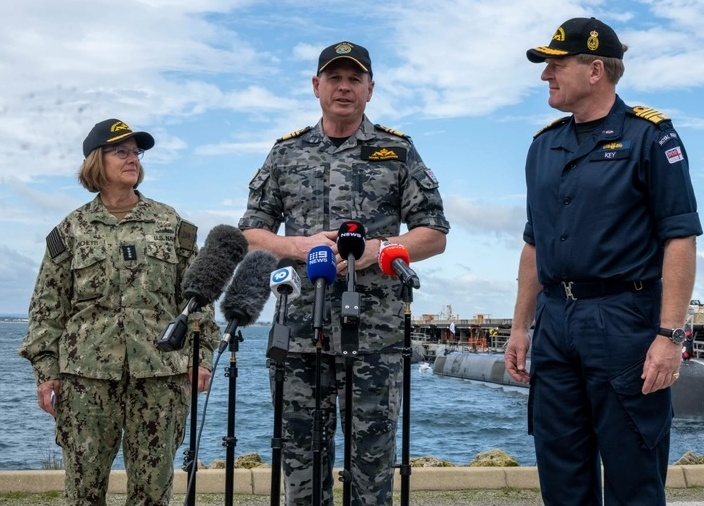
Hammond (centre) with Admiral Lisa Franchetti (USN) and Admiral Sir Ben Key (RN) at HMAS Stirling, 2024

In June 2022, the Deputy Prime Minister and Minister for Defence, Richard Marles, announced that Hammond would be appointed as the next Chief of Navy. Hammond succeeded Vice Admiral Michael Noonan in the role on 6 July 2022. He is the first graduate of the Australian Defence Force Academy to be appointed a service chief. In the 2023 King's Birthday Honours, Hammond was advanced to Officer of the Order of Australia for his "distinguished service" and "exceptional leader[ship]" in senior command roles. In April 2024 Hammond was awarded South Korea's Order of National Security Merit, 2nd Class and, in October 2024, the Meritorious Service Medal by Singapore's Minister for Defence, Ng Eng Hen.

Hammond was promoted to admiral and succeeded Admiral David Johnston as the Chief of the Defence Force on 9 July 2026.

Military offices
Preceded by Admiral David Johnston	Chief of the Defence Force; 2026–present	Incumbent
Preceded by Vice Admiral Michael Noonan	Chief of Navy; 2022–2026	Succeeded by Vice Admiral Matt Buckley
Preceded by Rear Admiral Jonathan Mead	Commander Australian Fleet; 2020–2022	Succeeded by Rear Admiral Jonathan Earley
Preceded by Rear Admiral Michael Noonan	Deputy Chief of Navy; 2018–2020	Succeeded by Rear Admiral Christopher Smith
