= Peter Hogarth Doyle =

Royal Australian Navy admiral

Peter Doyle
- Born: 27 September 1925; Lithgow, New South Wales
- Died: 2 May 2007 (aged 81); Melbourne, Victoria
- Military career
- Allegiance: Australia
- Branch: Royal Australian Navy
- Service years: 1939–1982
- Rank: Rear Admiral
- Nickname: "Daphne"
- Commands: Deputy Chief of Naval Staff (1981–82); HM Australian Fleet (1980–81); HMAS Melbourne (1976–77); Junior Recruit Training Establishment (1972–75); HMAS Perth (1966–68); HMAS Quickmatch (1961–62)
- Conflicts: Second World War; Korean War; Vietnam War
- Awards: Officer of the Order of Australia; Officer of the Order of the British Empire; Mentioned in despatches (2)

Rear Admiral Peter Hogarth Doyle, AO, OBE (27 September 1925 – 2 May 2007) was a senior commander of the Royal Australian Navy, who served as Deputy Chief of Naval Staff from 1981 to 1982. Doyle served in the Second World War, the Korean War and the Vietnam War in various roles before retiring in 1982. He was mentioned in despatches in the Korean and Vietnam Wars.

Military offices
Preceded by Rear Admiral John Stevens	Deputy Chief of Naval Staff; 1981–1982	Succeeded by Rear Admiral Geoffrey Woolrych
Preceded by Rear Admiral David Leach	Flag Officer Commanding HM Australian Fleet; 1980–1981	Succeeded by Rear Admiral John Stevens
