= Frederick Tickell =

Australian naval officer

- Born: 7 March 1857; Amoy Harbour, China
- Died: 19 September 1919 (aged 62); Australia
- Military career
- Allegiance: Colony of Victoria; Australia
- Branch: Victorian Naval Brigade; Royal Australian Navy
- Service years: 1888–1919
- Rank: Rear Admiral
- Commands: Director of Auxiliary Forces; Victorian Naval Contingent; Victorian Naval Forces
- Conflicts: Boxer Rebellion; First World War
- Awards: Companion of the Order of St Michael and St George; Mentioned in Despatches

Rear Admiral Frederick Tickell, CMG (7 March 1857 – 19 September 1919) was a senior officer of the Royal Australian Navy.

== Early life ==
Tickell was born on 7 March 1857 in Amoy Harbour, China, to Captain George Tickell, a seaman and officer of the Royal Naval Reserve, and his wife Charlotte (née Crabbe). The family settled in Melbourne in 1869 and Tickell was educated at Scotch College from 1870 to 1875.

Tickell married Mary Elizabeth Figg on 18 December 1886. They had three daughters and one son.

== Naval career ==
Tickell was commissioned a sub-lieutenant in the Victorian Naval Brigade in 1888. He was promoted to lieutenant in 1889 and, on promotion to commander, was appointed commandant of the Victorian Naval Forces in 1897. He led the Victorian Naval Contingent during the Boxer Rebellion, for which he was appointed a Companion of the Order of St Michael and St George and Mentioned in Despatches.

Promoted to captain in 1900, Tickell transferred to the Commonwealth Naval Forces (redesignated the Royal Australian Navy in 1911) following Federation in 1901. He was the service's third most senior officer. Tickell was naval commandant in Queensland from 1904 to 1907, naval commandant in Victoria from 1907 to 1911, and then Director of Auxiliary Forces. He was also aide-de-camp to the Governor-General of Australia from 1912.

Tickell died of a cerebro-vascular disease on 19 September 1919.
