= Hastings Harrington =

Royal Australian Navy admiral

Sir Hastings Harrington
- Born: Wilfred Hastings Harrington; 17 May 1906; Maryborough, Queensland
- Died: 17 December 1965 (aged 59); Canberra, Australian Capital Territory
- Military career
- Allegiance: Australia
- Branch: Royal Australian Navy
- Service years: 1924–1965
- Rank: Vice Admiral
- Nickname: "Arch"
- Commands: First Naval Member (1962–65); HM Australian Fleet (1959–62); HMAS Sydney (1955–57); HMAS Warramunga (1948–50); HMAS Quiberon (1944–45); HMAS Yarra (1939–42)
- Conflicts: Second World War
- Awards: Knight Commander of the Order of the British Empire; Companion of the Order of the Bath; Distinguished Service Order; Mentioned in Despatches

Vice Admiral Sir Wilfred Hastings "Arch" Harrington, KBE, CB, DSO (17 May 1906 – 17 December 1965) was a senior officer in the Royal Australian Navy (RAN), who served as First Naval Member and Chief of the Naval Staff from 1962 to 1965.

== Naval service ==
Born as the son of Hubert Ernest Harrington and his wife Laura Irene Barton, "Arch" Harrington was educated at Wychbury Preparatory School in Maryborough. In 1924, he joined the Royal Australian Naval College as a cadet midshipman. He served in the Second World War initially in command of the sloop HMAS Yarra, in which he saw action off the coast of Shatt al-Arab in Iraq in May 1941 and for which role he was mentioned in despatches. For his services in the War against Persia in August 1941 he was awarded the Distinguished Service Order. In February 1942 he moved to the cruiser HMAS Australia as executive officer, in which role he was again mentioned in dispatches, and in July 1944 he took command of the destroyer HMAS Quiberon.

Promoted to captain in 1947, he was given command of the destroyer HMAS Warramunga and in 1950 became director of manning at the Navy Office in Melbourne. He took command of the aircraft carrier HMAS Sydney in 1955, and following his promotion to rear admiral in 1957, he became Flag Officer, East Australia Area. He went on to be Second Naval Member of the Naval Board in 1958, flag officer commanding HM Australian Fleet in 1959 and First Naval Member and Chief of Naval Staff in 1962.

== Post service and death ==
Harrington was appointed Commissioner-General for Australia at Expo 67, but died in Canberra Hospital in December 1965. On 20 December, the ashes of Vice Admiral Sir Hastings Harrington were scattered from HMAS Vampire off the coast of Sydney.

== Family ==
In 1945, he married Agnes Janet Winser; they had two sons and two daughters.

== Sources ==
- Bastock, John (1975). Australia's Ships of War. Cremorne, NSW: Angus and Robertson. ISBN 0-207-12927-4. OCLC 2525523.

Military offices
Preceded by Vice Admiral Sir Henry Burrell	First Naval Member and Chief of Naval Staff; 1962–1965	Succeeded by Vice Admiral Sir Alan McNicoll
Preceded by Rear Admiral Galfry Gatacre	Flag Officer Commanding HM Australian Fleet; 1959–1962	Succeeded by Rear Admiral Alan McNicoll
