= Henry Burrell (admiral) =

Royal Australian Navy chief

Sir Henry Burrell
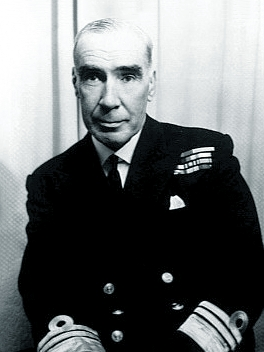
- Vice Admiral Henry Burrell c. 1959
- Born: 13 August 1904; Wentworth Falls, New South Wales
- Died: 9 February 1988 (aged 83); Canberra, Australian Capital Territory
- Military career
- Allegiance: Australia
- Branch: Royal Australian Navy
- Service years: 1918–1962
- Rank: Vice Admiral
- Commands: HMAS Norman (1941–43); HMAS Bataan (1945–46); 10th Destroyer Flotilla (1946); HMAS Australia (1948–49); HMAS Vengeance (1953–54); HM Australian Fleet (1955–56, 1958); Chief of the Naval Staff (1959–62)
- Conflicts: Spanish Civil War; World War II; Indian Ocean theatre; Battle of Madagascar; Mediterranean theatre; Operation Vigorous
- Awards: Knight Commander of the Order of the British Empire; Companion of the Order of the Bath; Mentioned in Despatches

Vice Admiral Sir Henry Mackay Burrell, KBE, CB (13 August 1904 – 9 February 1988) was a senior commander in the Royal Australian Navy (RAN). He served as Chief of the Naval Staff (CNS) from 1959 to 1962. Born in the Blue Mountains, Burrell entered the Royal Australian Naval College in 1918 as a 13-year-old cadet. His first posting at sea was aboard the cruiser HMAS Sydney. During the 1920s and 1930s, Burrell served for several years on exchange with the Royal Navy, specialising as a navigator. During World War II, he filled a key liaison post with the US Navy, and later saw action as commander of the destroyer HMAS Norman, earning a mention in despatches.

Promoted captain in 1946, Burrell played a major role in the formation of the RAN's Fleet Air Arm, before commanding the flagship HMAS Australia in 1948–49. He captained the light aircraft carrier HMAS Vengeance in 1953–54, and was twice Flag Officer of the Australian Fleet, in 1955–56 and 1958. Burrell was appointed a Commander of the Order of the British Empire in 1955 and a Companion of the Order of the Bath in 1959. As CNS, he began a major program of acquisitions for the Navy, including new helicopters, minesweepers, submarines and guided-missile destroyers. He also acted to reverse a plan by the government of the day to dismantle the Fleet Air Arm. Knighted in 1960, Burrell retired to his farm near Canberra in 1962 and published his memoirs, Mermaids Do Exist, in 1986. He died two years later, aged 83.

== Early life and career ==
Henry Mackay Burrell was born at Wentworth Falls, in the Blue Mountains district of New South Wales. He was the third child and only son of schoolteacher Thomas Burrell and his wife, Eliza. Henry's father, who had emigrated from England, joined the Australian Imperial Force aged 55 during World War I, seeing active service in Egypt. His grandfather and great-grandfather had served in the Royal Navy. Henry attended Parramatta High School before entering the Royal Australian Naval College, Jervis Bay, on 1 January 1918, aged 13. A keen sportsman, he competed in rugby union, tennis and hockey, winning colours for hockey. Burrell graduated from the college in 1921 and became a midshipman the next year. He went to sea first aboard the light cruiser HMAS Sydney and then the destroyer HMAS Stalwart. Posted to the United Kingdom for further training in 1924, he served on the light cruiser HMS Caledon and the battleship HMS Malaya. In April 1925, he was promoted to sub-lieutenant, rising to lieutenant by July 1926.

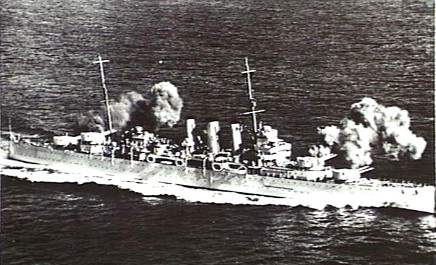
HMS Devonshire during the Spanish Civil War

After attending a Royal Navy course in 1930, Burrell became a specialist navigator, and saw service aboard the minesweeper HMS Pangbourne, destroyers HMAS Tattoo and Stuart, and cruiser HMAS Brisbane. He married Margaret MacKay at Scots' Church, Melbourne, on 27 December 1933. Burrell was promoted to lieutenant commander in July 1934, and graduated from an advanced navigation course the next year.

Burrell served on exchange with the Royal Navy as navigator aboard the cruisers HMS Coventry and HMS Devonshire, the latter during her tour of duty in the Spanish Civil War. Described as being "egalitarian" and "approachable", his familiarity with ratings earned him the criticism of Devonshire's captain. Burrell, however, believed that a close relationship between officers and men was necessary for the smooth running of a ship. After completing the Royal Navy's staff course in 1938, he returned to Australia and was appointed staff officer (operations) at the Navy Office, Melbourne, in March 1939. It was Burrell's first shore-based position, and he spent the next four months bringing naval sections of the War Book (preparations for war) up to date.

== World War II ==
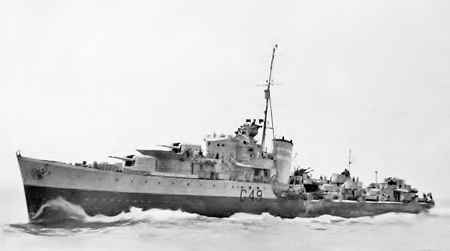
HMAS Norman, commanded by Burrell in 1941–43

Burrell was still based at the Navy Office when World War II broke out in September 1939. A reorganisation of the headquarters in May 1940 saw him promoted to commander and given the new role of Director of Operations, overseeing troop convoys and their air cover, local defence, and staffing issues. Burrell's "full knowledge of Australian naval plans and resources" led to Prime Minister Robert Menzies personally nominating him to participate in staff talks with representatives of the Royal Navy and US Navy in October. Soon after, he was posted as the first Australian naval attaché to Washington, D.C., in an effort to improve communications with the US in light of the threat from Japan. Burrell was credited with helping to foster closer cooperation between the two navies in the Pacific region. He also warned the Australian government that Britain and the US would adopt a "Germany-first" strategy in the event of war with Japan, and that the US was prepared to weaken its Pacific fleet to help secure the Atlantic.

Posted to Britain, Burrell was appointed commanding officer of the newly commissioned N-class destroyer HMAS Norman on 15 September 1941. The ship's first operation was transporting a Trades Union Congress delegation led by Sir Walter Citrine to Archangel, Russia. After returning to Britain, she steamed to the Indian Ocean to join Admiral Sir James Somerville's Eastern Fleet at Addu Atoll, Maldives, on 26 February 1942. Following the Eastern Fleet's withdrawal to Kilindini, Kenya, Norman took part in the capture of Diego Suarez on Madagascar on 7 May. Later that month, she was reassigned to the Mediterranean and in June was involved in Operation Vigorous, an unsuccessful attempt to resupply the besieged island of Malta. Transferred back to the Indian Ocean, Burrell led Norman in the second campaign of the Battle of Madagascar in September, and was mentioned in despatches on 19 February 1943 for his "bravery and resource" during the operation. By this time Norman was escorting convoys in the Pacific, before deploying to the South Atlantic for anti-submarine duties in April–May.

The news was the greatest thrill for us all ... My words cannot express their joy at deliverance to say nothing of ours.

— Commander Burrell on finding survivors of HMAS Perth in a camp at Sendai, Japan

On 23 June 1943, Burrell relinquished command of Norman and returned to the Navy Office, Melbourne, as Director of Plans. Having been divorced from his first wife Margaret in November 1941, he married mineralogist Ada Weller (also known as Ada Coggan) on 21 April 1944; the couple had a son and two daughters. Burrell took charge of the RAN's latest Tribal-class destroyer, HMAS Bataan, at her commissioning in Sydney on 25 May 1945. Arriving on the scene too late to see action, the ship was deployed to Japan via the Philippines in July, docking in Tokyo on 31 August. There she participated in the formal surrender ceremonies that took place on 2 September aboard USS Missouri. Bataan remained in Japan as Australian Squadron representative until November, assisting with the repatriation of inmates from Japanese prisoner-of-war camps. On a mission to one such camp at Sendai, Burrell located crewmen from the light cruiser HMAS Perth, which had been sunk in the early hours of 1 March 1942 during the Battle of Sunda Strait; 320 of her complement of 680 survived the sinking, 105 dying in captivity.

== Post-war career ==
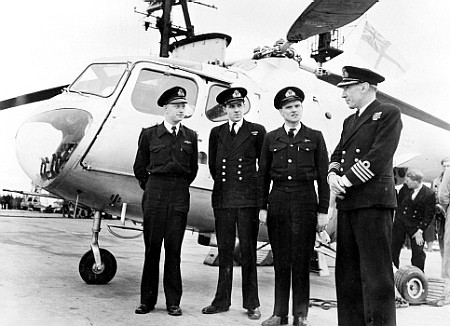
Captain Burrell (right) and crew beside a Bristol Sycamore helicopter on HMAS Vengeance, c. 1954

Burrell's first appointment following the cessation of hostilities was as commander of the 10th Destroyer Flotilla. He was promoted captain in June 1946, and became Deputy Chief of the Naval Staff (DCNS) that October. As DCNS, Burrell played a major role in establishing the Navy's Fleet Air Arm and preparing for the introduction of carrier-based aircraft. He was appointed an aide-de-camp to Governor-General William McKell in July 1947. From October 1948 to the end of 1949, Burrell served as commanding officer of the heavy cruiser HMAS Australia, flagship of the RAN. Posted to Britain in 1950, he attended the Imperial Defence College, London, and spent two years as Assistant Australian Defence Representative. He took command of the light aircraft carrier HMAS Vengeance on 2 December 1952, less than three weeks after she was commissioned into the RAN after transfer from the Royal Navy. The ship began working up for deployment to the Korean War in June 1953, but in the end her place was taken by the carrier HMAS Sydney. Vengeance was involved in a collision with HMAS Bataan near the Cocos Islands on 5 April 1954, while acting as part of the escort for the Royal Yacht of Queen Elizabeth II and Prince Philip during their inaugural tour of Australia, but continued on duty.

Completing his tour as captain of Vengeance, Burrell briefly resumed the role of Deputy Chief of the Naval Staff in August 1954. The next month he was made an aide-de-camp to the Queen. Burrell was appointed a Commander of the Order of the British Empire in the 1955 New Year Honours. In February he became Flag Officer of the Australian Fleet, with the acting rank of rear admiral; this was made substantive in July. On 12 May 1956, he hoisted his standard aboard the recently arrived aircraft carrier HMAS Melbourne, marking her replacement of sister ship HMAS Sydney as flagship of the RAN. Burrell was posted soon afterwards to the Navy Office, Canberra, to redevelop the service's officer structure, leading to a new General List of officers' seniority. He served as Second Naval Member (Personnel) from September 1956 until January 1958, when he again became Flag Officer of the Australian Fleet. Appointed a Companion of the Order of the Bath in the 1959 New Years Honours, Burrell was raised to vice admiral on 24 February and became First Naval Member, the Chief of the Naval Staff (CNS). He succeeded Vice Admiral Sir Roy Dowling.

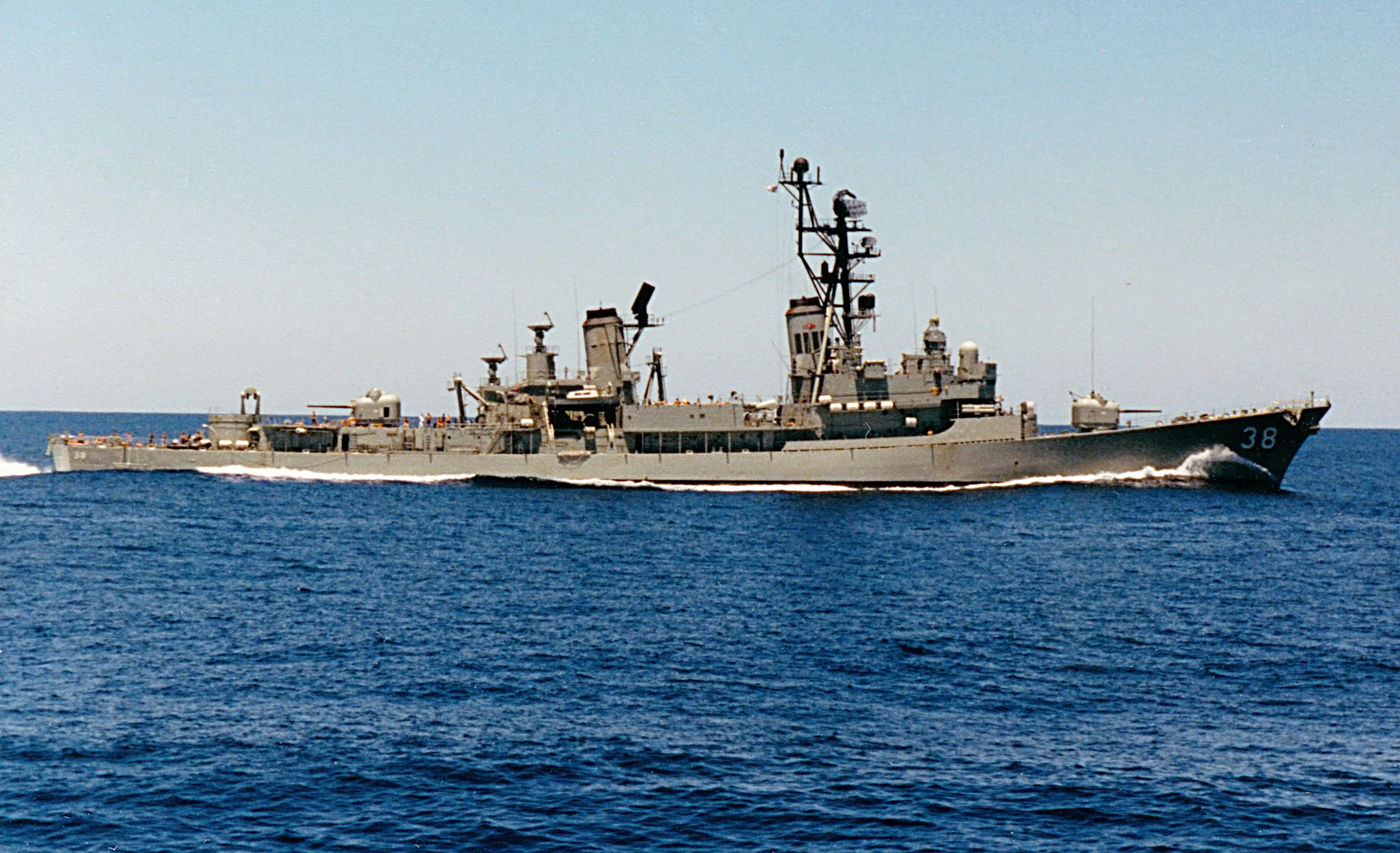
HMAS Perth, first of the RAN's guided-missile destroyers ordered by Burrell, at sea in 1980

As CNS, Vice Admiral Burrell had to contend with a threat by Defence Minister Athol Townley to disband the Navy's fixed-wing Fleet Air Arm capability by 1963, but gained approval for a major vessel re-equipment drive that was to include new submarines, destroyers, minesweepers, and auxiliaries. This led among other things to the procurement of British Oberon-class submarines, selected by Burrell when his original preference for an Australian-built craft proved too expensive, as well as Ton-class minesweepers and the Navy's first purpose-designed hydrographic survey ship, HMAS Moresby. The re-equipment program also resulted in augmentation of the RAN's rotary-wing assets with Westland Wessex anti-submarine warfare helicopters. Most significant was the purchase of three Charles F. Adams-class guided-missile destroyers, a decision of "ingenuity and forethought" on the part of Burrell and Navy Minister John Gorton, according to historian Tom Frame. The CNS and his minister enjoyed a close working relationship; Burrell declared that Gorton "deserves our thanks for his efforts", and Gorton called Burrell "one of the most honest, sincere and most dedicated sailors".

The purchase of the destroyers signalled a shift in reliance for equipment from Britain to the United States that was contrary to prevailing Australian defence policy at the time, particularly in what historian Jeffrey Grey described as "the most British of the Australian services, the RAN", and provoked pressure from the Royal Navy and UK shipbuilders, which had lobbied for purchase of their County-class destroyer. Burrell later declared that the superiority of the US weapons system was a key factor in his preference for the Adams design over the County class. On a mission overseas to discuss trends and acquisitions in January 1960, he was rebuffed by Britain's Chief of the Defence Staff, Admiral of the Fleet Lord Mountbatten, who mistakenly thought him responsible for the imminent dissolution of the RAN's Fleet Air Arm, but warmly welcomed by the US Chief of Naval Operations, Admiral Arleigh Burke. As it happened, Burrell would gain credit for maintaining the integrity of the FAA, and its fixed-wing component remained viable until the early 1980s. He was appointed a Knight Commander of the Order of the British Empire in the Queen's Birthday Honours, gazetted on 3 June 1960. In June 1961, he met with his opposite numbers in the Army and Air Force at a Chiefs of Staff Committee conference to discuss the necessity of Australia acquiring nuclear weapons; the chiefs agreed that the probability such a capability would be required was remote but that it should remain an option under certain circumstances, a position the defence forces maintained during the ensuing decade.

== Retirement ==
We will need a Navy as long as Australia remains an island—and the best place to fight, if unhappily that should be required, is as far from Australia as possible.

— Henry Burrell as CNS, discussing naval air power

Burrell made his farewell to the Australian Fleet aboard HMAS Melbourne at Jervis Bay on 8 February 1962. He left the Navy on 23 February, and was succeeded as CNS by Vice Admiral Hastings Harrington. Burrell retired to Illogan Park, his property near Braidwood in the Southern Tablelands of New South Wales. His son Stuart followed him into the Royal Australian Naval College in 1963. In retirement Burrell enjoyed horse racing as a gambler and as the owner of several successful mounts. During the 1960s, he was also a member of the ACT Regional Selection Committee of the Winston Churchill Memorial Trusts.

Burrell suffered a serious heart attack in 1980, having been diagnosed with cardiac problems shortly after his retirement from the Navy. His wife Ada died in August 1981. In 1986, Burrell published his memoirs as Mermaids Do Exist: The Autobiography of Vice-Admiral Sir Henry Burrell, reflecting on what he described as a "lucky" career, and offering his thoughts on maritime strategy. He died on 9 February 1988 in Woden Valley Hospital. Survived by his three children, Burrell was buried in Gungahlin, Australian Capital Territory, after a private funeral. The Burrell Cup doubles tennis trophy, established by the admiral in 1955, completed its 58th year of competition in March 2013.

== Notes ==
Military offices
Preceded by Vice Admiral Sir Roy Dowling	First Naval Member & Chief of Staff; 1959–1962	Succeeded by Vice Admiral Sir Hastings Harrington
Preceded by Rear Admiral David Harries	Flag Officer Commanding HM Australian Fleet; 1958–1959	Succeeded by Rear Admiral Galfry Gatacre
Preceded by Rear Admiral Roy Dowling	Flag Officer Commanding HM Australian Fleet; 1955–1956	Succeeded by Rear Admiral David Harries
