= Robert Walls (admiral) =

Australian admiral (1941–2023)

- Born: 15 March 1941; Colac, Victoria
- Died: 28 August 2023 (aged 82)
- Military career
- Allegiance: Australia
- Branch: Royal Australian Navy
- Service years: 1955–1997
- Rank: Vice Admiral
- Commands: Vice Chief of the Defence Force (1995–97); Maritime Commander Australia (1991–93); Deputy Chief of Naval Staff (1991); HMAS Brisbane (1987–88); HMAS Moreton (1983–84); HMAS Tobruk (1981–83)
- Conflicts: Indonesia–Malaysia confrontation Vietnam War
- Awards: Officer of the Order of Australia; Knight of the National Order of Merit (France)

Vice Admiral Robert Andrew Kevin Walls, AO (15 March 1941 – 28 August 2023) was a senior officer of the Royal Australian Navy (RAN). In 42 years of service, Walls commanded HMA Ships Tobruk, Moreton and Brisbane, and served as Deputy Chief of Naval Staff and Maritime Commander Australia, before his career culminated in his appointment as Vice Chief of the Defence Force from April 1995 until his retirement in March 1997.

== Early life ==
Walls was born in Colac, Victoria, on 15 March 1941, the eldest of four sons to Andrew Nowell Walls, a local government official who served as a cypher officer in the Royal Australian Naval Volunteer Reserve during the Second World War, and Hilda Margaret (née Thompson). Initially educated at Colac High School, Walls joined the Royal Australian Naval College at HMAS Cerberus as a cadet midshipman in January 1955; his class was the last intake of 13-year-olds to be accepted by the college. Mid-way through Walls' training, the college relocated to HMAS Creswell in Jervis Bay.

== Naval career ==
Walls graduated in late 1958 and, following service at sea in HMAS Swan, was sent to the Britannia Royal Naval College in the United Kingdom for further training from April 1959. Promoted to acting sub-lieutenant, he returned to Australia in September 1960, served in HMAS Melbourne and HMAS Quiberon, then completed the Destroyer Gunnery Officer’s course at HMAS Cerberus in 1962. His next posting was to HMAS Quickmatch, during which he was promoted to lieutenant in February 1963. Following further specialist training at Cerberus later that year, Walls joined HMAS Derwent as part of the ship's commissioning crew in 1964. He remained on the Derwent for just over a year, which included service in the waters off Malaysia and Borneo as part of the Indonesia–Malaysia confrontation.

In November 1965, Walls joined the crew of HMAS Hobart as the ship was commissioned into service in the United States. His time with Hobart, which was to last over two years, included a deployment to Vietnamese waters from March to September 1967. Hobart operated in gunfire support duties as part of the United States Seventh Fleet during this time, with Walls serving as an Air Intercept Controller; this included brief secondments to USS Kitty Hawk and USS Long Beach. The six month tour saw Hobart fire over 10,000 rounds at 1,050 targets, with the ship itself being fired upon ten times but suffering no casualties. In recognition of this, Hobart's crew was recognised with the award of a United States Navy Unit Commendation.

Walls returned to the United Kingdom from March 1968 for a three-year exchange with the Royal Navy. The posting occasioned service aboard the aircraft carrier HMS Hermes and as a training officer at the Royal Naval Air Station Yeovilton. He was promoted to lieutenant commander in February 1971 and, returning to Australian soon thereafter, was made direction officer on HMAS Perth. This was followed by a period as a training officer at HMAS Watson, before Walls was posted to the staff of the Flag Officer Commanding HM Australian Fleet in 1975. Made executive officer of the Perth in January 1977, he was promoted to commander in June that year.

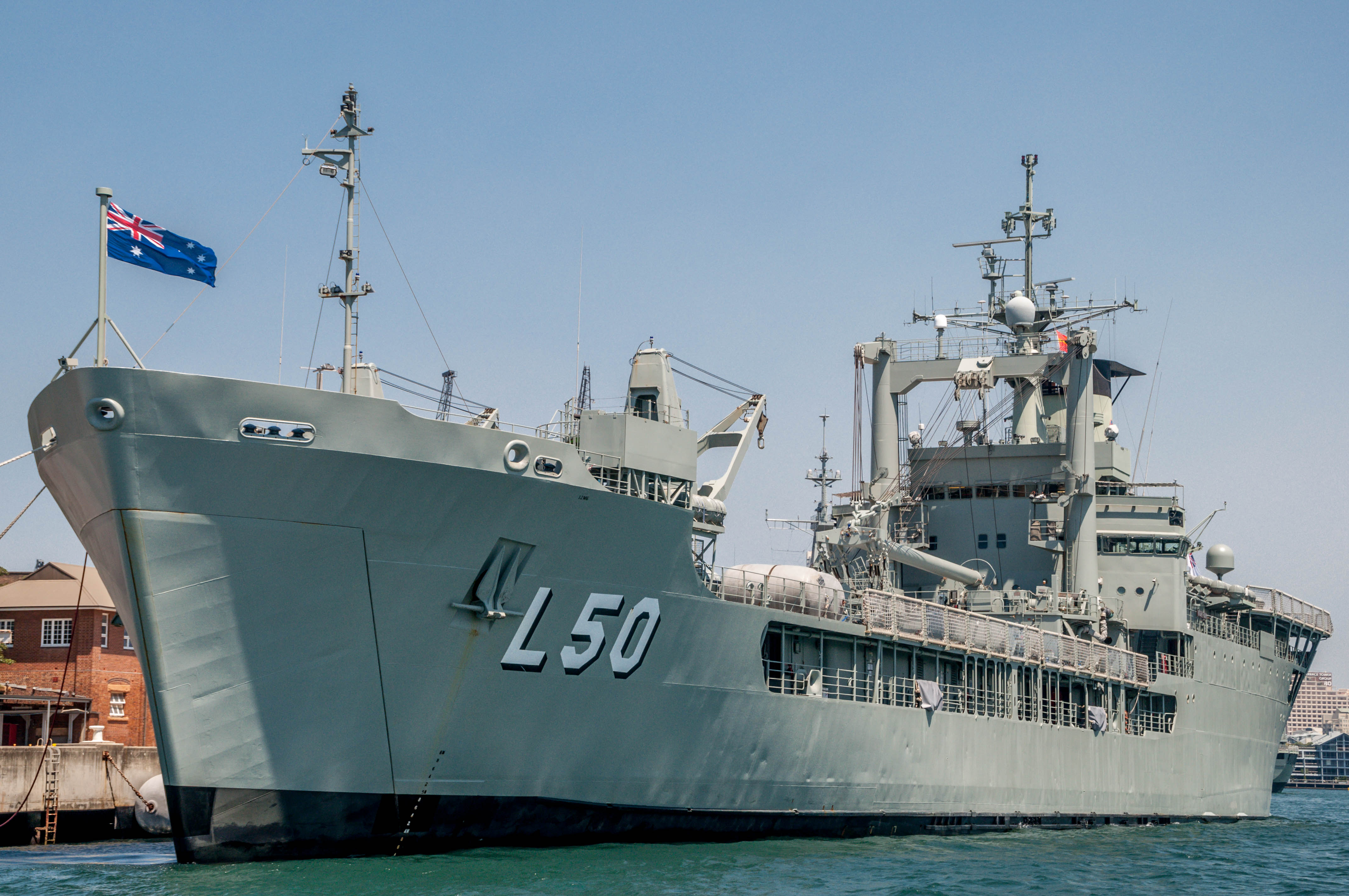
HMAS Tobruk, Walls' first ship command (1981–83).

Walls' second posting to the Perth was a relatively brief one, as he was relocated to the Navy Office in Canberra for staff work from February 1978 for a period of almost four years. This was followed by appointment to his first ship command, the recently commissioned heavy-lift ship HMAS Tobruk, in December 1981. Walls' period of command was marked by Tobruk's first operational deployment. The ship left Brisbane on 15 February 1982 to transport eight UH-1 Iroquois helicopters of the Royal Australian Air Force, along with supporting stores, to join the Multinational Force and Observers in the Sinai Peninsula. On docking at Ashdod on 19 March, Tobruk became the first Australian warship to visit Israel. Walls and his crew arrived back in Brisbane on 30 April. In June the following year, Walls was made Commander Australian Amphibious Squadron and commanding officer of the naval base HMAS Moreton.

On promotion to captain in June 1984, Walls returned to the Navy Office as Director of Naval Force Development. For his services in this role, he was appointed a Member of the Order of Australia in the Queen's Birthday Honours of June 1987. That same month, he was appointed to command the guided missile destroyer HMAS Brisbane. Promoted to commodore in June 1988, Walls attended the National Defence College in New Delhi, India the following year, graduating with a Master of Defence Studies. Returning to Australia in 1990, he was appointed Director-General Naval Policy and Maritime Doctrine. He was promoted to rear admiral that June.

Following a brief tenure as Deputy Chief of Naval Staff for eight months in 1991, Walls was appointed Maritime Commander Australia during a ceremony aboard his former command, HMAS Tobruk, on 7 November. In this role, he was responsible for the command of the Australian fleet. While Maritime Commander, Walls also served on the board of the Young Endeavour Youth Scheme. Advanced to an Officer of the Order of Australia in the Australia Day Honours of 1992, he was made Assistant Chief of Defence Force (Development) in 1994. Walls served in this role for a year, before he was promoted to vice admiral and appointed Vice Chief of the Defence Force (VCDF) on 20 April 1995 in succession to Lieutenant General John Baker, who had been appointed Chief of the Defence Force. Walls' tenure as VCDF coincided with an efficiency review into the Defence organisation, to which he was appointed to the senior review panel. Walls retired from the RAN in March 1997 after 42 years of service, and was succeeded as VCDF by Vice Admiral Chris Barrie.

== Retirement ==
On his retirement from the RAN, Walls embarked on a corporate career in the defence industry. He was a director of the defence manufacturer Thales Underwater Systems from 1997 to 2003, on the board of the Australian defence contractor CEA Technologies from 1998 to 2000, chairman of Smart Shield from 1999 to 2001, and a director of the defence contractor ADI Limited from 1999 to 2003. Walls has also served on the Advisory Council for the Australian National University's Strategic and Defence Studies Centre. In 2002 he was recognised by the French government with appointment as a Knight of the National Order of Merit. A keen fly fisher and opera attendee, Walls lived in the Australian Capital Territory until his death on 28 August 2023, at the age of 82.

== Notes ==
Military offices
Preceded by Lieutenant General John Baker	Vice Chief of the Defence Force; 1995–1997	Succeeded by Vice Admiral Chris Barrie
Preceded by Rear Admiral Ken Doolan	Maritime Commander Australia; 1991–1993	Succeeded by Rear Admiral Donald Chalmers
Preceded by Rear Admiral Ian MacDougall	Deputy Chief of Naval Staff; 1991	Succeeded by Rear Admiral Rodney Taylor
