= Bill Dovers =

- Born: 19 September 1951 (age 75); Sydney, New South Wales
- Relatives: Rear Admiral William John Dovers (father)
- Military career
- Allegiance: Australia
- Branch: Royal Australian Navy
- Service years: 1970–2000
- Rank: Rear Admiral
- Commands: HMAS Adelaide (1989–90)
- Conflicts: Gulf War
- Awards: Conspicuous Service Cross

Rear Admiral William Anthony George Dovers, CSC (born 19 September 1951) is a retired senior officer of the Royal Australian Navy.

== Early life ==
Bill Dovers was educated at Newington College (1959–1969), commencing as a preparatory school student in Wyvern House, before entering the Royal Australian Naval College in 1970.

== Naval career ==
Dovers has served aboard the Australian warships HMAS Swan, HMAS Melbourne, HMAS Anzac, HMAS Vendetta, and HMAS Duchess, along with American destroyer USS Cochrane. He received the Conspicuous Service Cross in 1991 in recognition of his command of HMAS Adelaide during the Gulf War.
