= Conspicuous Service Medal =

Australian medal for military conspicuous service

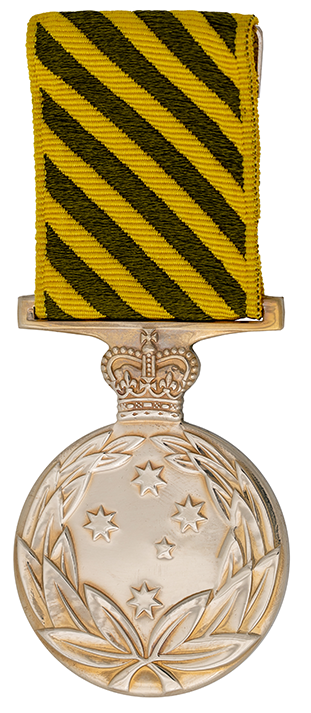
- Obverse of medal and ribbon
- Type: Medal
- Awarded for: meritorious achievement or dedication to duty in non-war like situations to members of the Australian Defence Force
- Presented by: Australia
- Eligibility: Members of the Australian Defence Force and Officers & Instructors of the Australian Defence Force Cadets
- Post-nominals: CSM
- Status: Currently awarded
- Established: 18 October 1989
- Final award: 2025 Australia Day Honours

Highlights
- Total: 1,754
- Ribbon with clasp to represent a second award

Order of Wear
- Next (higher): Order of Saint John
- Next (lower): Australian Antarctic Medal (AAM)
- Related: Conspicuous Service Cross (CSC)

The Conspicuous Service Medal (CSM) is a military decoration awarded to personnel of the Australian Defence Force, and officers and instructors of the Australian Defence Force Cadets. It is awarded for meritorious achievement or dedication to duty in non-war like situations. The CSM was introduced in 1989 and is a distinct Australian military award. It is the second level award of the Conspicuous Service Decorations in the Australian Honours System. Recipients of the Conspicuous Service Medal are entitled to use the post-nominal letters "CSM". Since its inception 1,021 had been awarded, plus a single Bar. All ranks are eligible for the award.

== Description ==
- The Conspicuous Service Medal is a circular nickel-silver medal 38 mm in diameter. It is ensigned with the Crown of Saint Edward in nickel-silver. The obverse bears the Southern Cross surrounded by a laurel wreath.
- The reverse has a horizontal panel that is superimposed on a design of fluted rays.
- The medal is suspended from the ribbon by a nickel-silver suspension bar.
- The 32 mm ribbon has alternating equal-width, diagonal stripes of bush green and sandy gold.

== See also ==
- Australian Honours Order of Precedence
