= Ian Knox (admiral) =

Australian naval admiral (1933–2024)

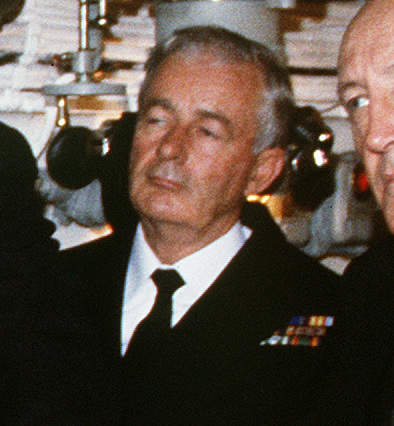
- Knox in 1986
- Born: 9 February 1933; Wilcannia, New South Wales, Australia
- Died: 14 January 2024 (aged 90)
- Military career
- Allegiance: Australia
- Branch: Royal Australian Navy
- Service years: 1947–1989
- Rank: Vice Admiral
- Commands: Vice Chief of the Defence Force (1987–1989); HM Australian Fleet (1985–1987); Deputy Chief of Naval Staff (1984); HMAS Melbourne (1980); HMAS Hobart (1973–1974); HMAS Torrens (1971–1972)
- Conflicts: Malayan Emergency; Vietnam War
- Awards: Companion of the Order of Australia

Vice Admiral Ian Warren Knox, AC (9 February 1933 – 14 January 2024) was a senior officer of the Royal Australian Navy (RAN). In a 42-year career, Knox commanded HMA Ships Torrens, Hobart and Melbourne, briefly served as Deputy Chief of Naval Staff, and was Flag Officer Commanding HM Australian Fleet from 1985 to 1987. His career culminated with his appointment as Vice Chief of the Defence Force in January 1987; a position he held until his retirement in September 1989.

== Early life ==
Knox was born in Wilcannia, New South Wales, on 9 February 1933 to Robert George Knox and his wife Kathleen Lily. He was educated at Wilcannia Primary School and Adelaide's Prince Alfred College. In 1947 he joined the Royal Australian Naval College at HMAS Creswell as a 13 year old cadet midshipman. The class was to prove a high achieving one. Out of the 24 cadets, three were to retire from the RAN as commodores, one (Sir David Martin) as a rear admiral and later Governor of New South Wales, Knox as a vice admiral and Vice Chief of the Defence Force, while a sixth, Mike Hudson, became an admiral and Chief of Naval Staff.

== Naval career ==
Commissioned in October 1950, Knox received further training ashore and at sea in both Australia and the United Kingdom. He married on 1 December 1956, to Margaret, with whom he had two sons and a daughter. The following year, he completed the Long Course in Torpedo and Anti-Submarine Warfare in the United Kingdom, being awarded the Ogilvy Medal as dux of the course. In 1960, he was posted to the Aeronautical Research Laboratory in Melbourne as the Anti-Submarine Warfare Project Officer. In this role, he assisted in the development of the Ikara ASW Guided Missile System. Service as a staff officer with the Navy Office in Canberra followed from 1964.

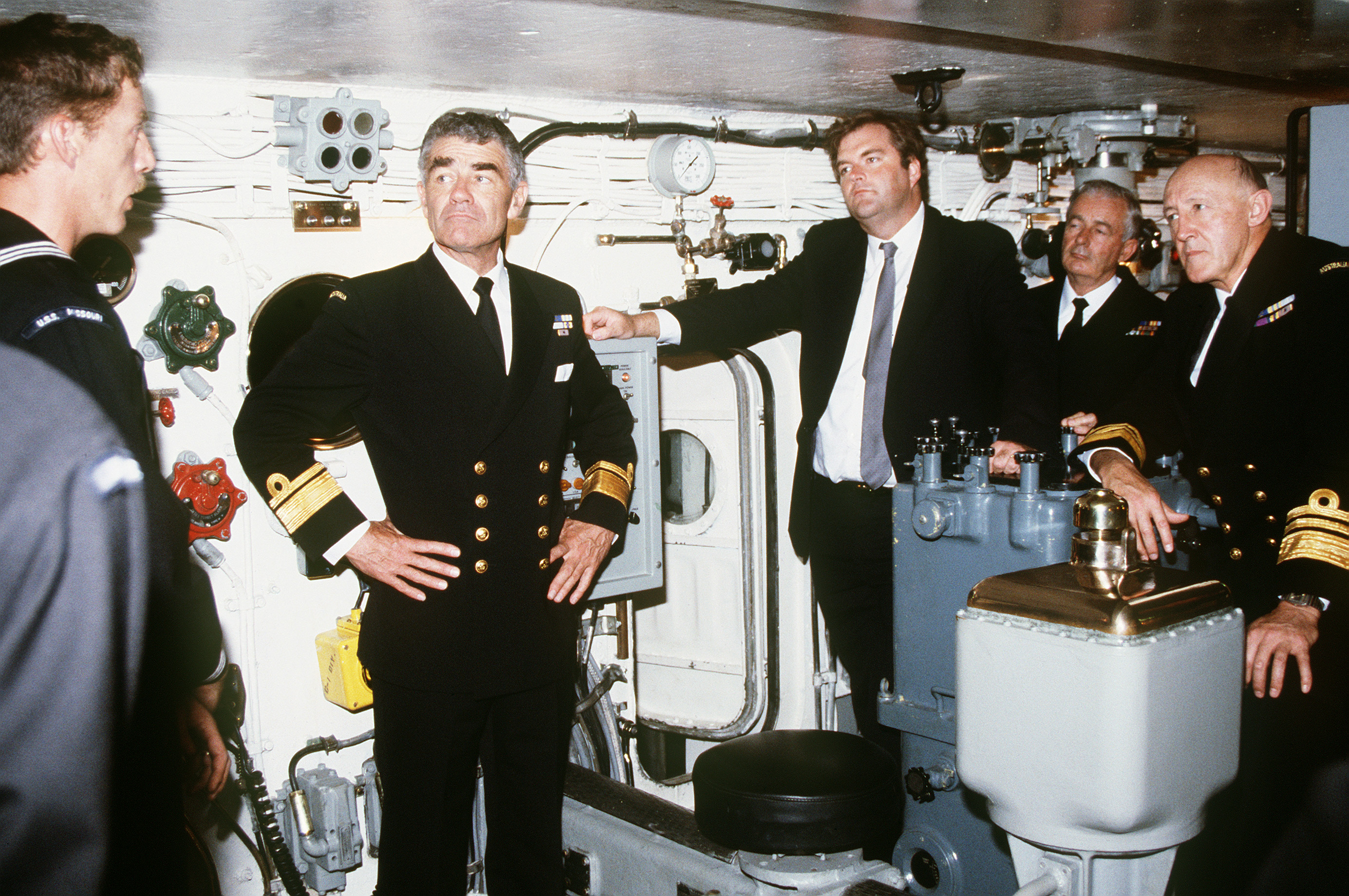
On board the USS Missouri in September 1986. Left to right: a US seaman, David Martin, Kim Beazley, Knox and Mike Hudson.

In 1966 Knox was appointed executive officer of the destroyer HMAS Perth. He served two years with Perth, which included a seven-month deployment to Vietnamese waters from September 1967 to April 1968. Promoted to commander later that year, Knox was appointed Director Underwater Weapons at the Navy Office before being made the inaugural commanding officer of the destroyer escort HMAS Torrens in 1971. From 1972 to 1973, he attended the United States Naval War College in Newport, Rhode Island, following which he was made captain and appointed commanding officer of the guided missile destroyer HMAS Hobart. His next posting, in 1975, was to the Strategic and International Policy Division in the Department of Defence. His service in this role occasioned attendance at the third through to the sixth sessions of the United Nations Law of the Sea Conference as part of the Australian delegation. In 1979, Knox returned to the United Kingdom to attend the Royal College of Defence Studies. On graduation, he was promoted commodore and appointed to command the aircraft carrier HMAS Melbourne. He was next posted as Director-General Naval Plans and Policy in 1981.

In 1982 Knox was promoted to rear admiral and appointed Chief of Naval Operational Requirements and Plans. He briefly served as Deputy Chief of Naval Staff in 1984, before he was made Flag Officer Commanding HM Australian Fleet in 1985. In the Queen's Birthday Honours list that year, Knox was appointed an Officer of the Order of Australia for his service in the former two positions. After almost two years in command of the Fleet, Knox was posted to Canberra as Assistant Chief of Defence Force (Policy) in January 1987 for six months, before he was promoted vice admiral and appointed Vice Chief of the Defence Force (VCDF) in succession to Air Marshal Ray Funnell, who had been appointed Chief of the Air Staff. From 1988, Knox occupied a dual role as VCDF and Commander Joint Forces Australia. Advanced to a Companion of the Order of Australia in July 1989, Knox retired from the RAN that September after 42 years of service and was succeeded as VCDF by Vice Admiral Alan Beaumont.

== Retirement ==
Knox served on the board of directors of several companies following his retirement from the RAN, including Australia Sonar Systems, Oceanic Capital Corporation and Thomson-CSF Pacific Holdings. Recreationally, he enjoyed tennis, traveling and, having obtained a pilot's license in 1988, flying. He was also an active Legatee in the Sydney area, having joined the organisation in 2000. Knox lived in Lavender Bay.

Knox died on 14 January 2024, at the age of 90.

Military offices
Preceded by Air Marshal Ray Funnell	Vice Chief of the Defence Force; 1987–1989	Succeeded by Vice Admiral Alan Beaumont
Preceded by Rear Admiral Geoffrey Woolrych	Flag Officer Commanding HM Australian Fleet; 1985–1987	Succeeded by Rear Admiral Peter Sinclair
Preceded by Rear Admiral Ian Richards	Deputy Chief of Naval Staff; 1984	Succeeded by Rear Admiral Neil Ralph
