= David Martin (governor) =

Royal Australian Navy officer and governor

Rear Admiral Sir David Martin KCMG, AO
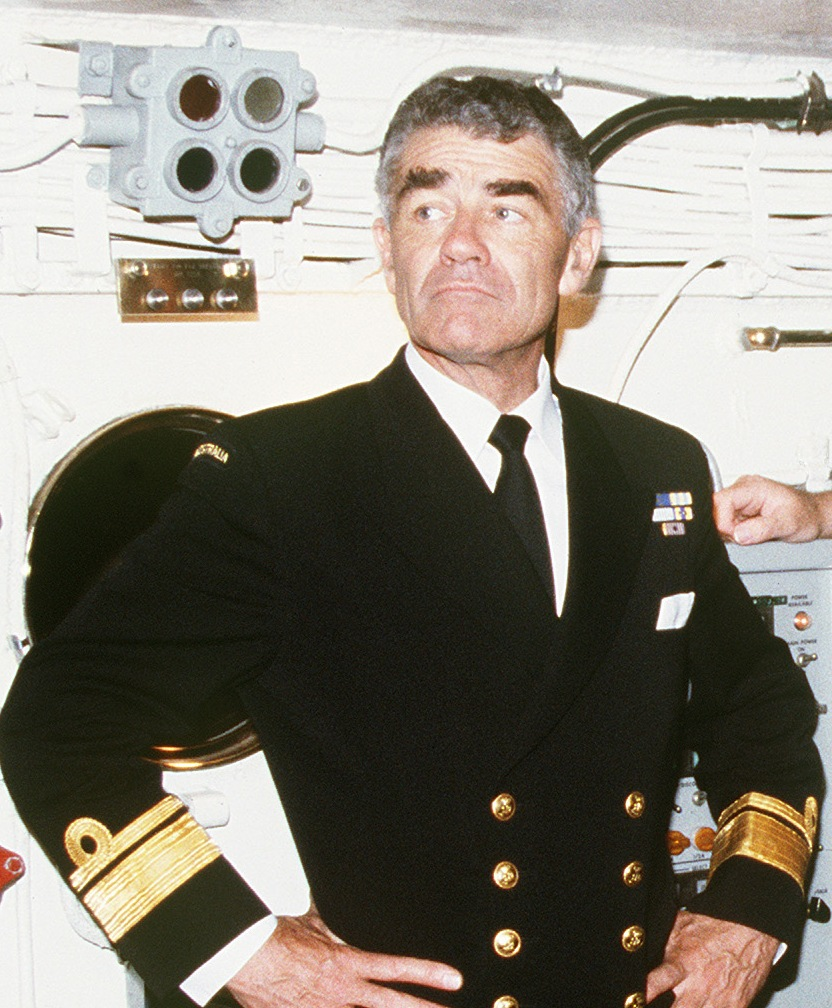
- Martin on board the USS Missouri in 1986.

34th Governor of New South Wales
- In office 20 January 1989 – 7 August 1990
- Monarch: Elizabeth II
- Premier: Nick Greiner
- Lieutenant: Murray Gleeson
- Preceded by: Sir James Rowland
- Succeeded by: Peter Sinclair

Personal details
- Born: 15 April 1933 Sydney, New South Wales, Australia
- Died: 10 August 1990 (aged 57) Sydney, New South Wales, Australia
- Spouse(s): Suzanne, Lady Martin (née Millear)
- Civilian awards: Knight Commander of the Order of St Michael and St George

Military service
- Allegiance: Australia
- Branch/service: Royal Australian Navy
- Years of service: 1947–1988
- Rank: Rear Admiral
- Commands: HMAS Melbourne (1979–80); HMAS Supply (1978); HMAS Torrens (1974–75); HMAS Queenborough (1969–70)
- Battles/wars: Korean War; Cyprus Emergency; Iceland Emergency
- Military awards: Officer of the Order of Australia

Rear Admiral Sir David James Martin, KCMG, AO (15 April 1933 – 10 August 1990) was a senior officer of the Royal Australian Navy and later Governor of New South Wales. He also established the Sir David Martin Foundation to assist young Australians in crisis.

== Early life and Naval career ==
Born in Sydney on 15 April 1933, Martin came from a long line of naval officers. He was descended from Lieutenant George Johnston, one of the Royal Marines of the First Fleet, and the convict Esther Abrahams. Their son, Robert, was the first Australian born person to enlist in the Royal Navy, which he joined in 1805. In 1942, when David was nine years old, his father was lost in action following the sinking of HMAS Perth of which he was Deputy Commander.

Martin attended Scots College in Bellevue Hill from 1939–1946 before joining the RAN as a cadet midshipman and entering the Royal Australian Naval College in 1947. He also attended the Royal Naval College, Greenwich, before serving aboard HMAS Sydney during the Korean War, then aboard the aircraft carriers HMAS Vengeance and HMAS Melbourne.

He was an officer on HMS Battleaxe, participating in the Cyprus Emergency, and the Iceland emergency (also known as the "Cod Wars"), in 1959–1960. He was promoted to Commander of the Third Australian Destroyer Squadron in 1974 and commanded several RAN ships, including HMA Ships Queenborough, Torrens, Supply and Melbourne. Martin was promoted to flag rank in 1982 and served as Chief of Naval Personnel and as Commander of Naval Support Command until he retired in February 1988. On 26 January 1985, the Queen appointed Martin an Officer of the Order of Australia (AO) "for service as the Chief of Naval Personnel and flag officer Naval Support Command".

== Marriage ==
Martin married Suzanne Millear in 1957 and had three children, one of whom was a Captain in the Royal Australian Navy.

== Later life ==
Martin was knighted as a Knight Commander of the Order of St Michael and St George (KCMG) in 1988, shortly before being appointed the Governor of New South Wales. Martin set about establishing a relationship between his office as governor and the people of New South Wales. He soon became known as 'the people's Governor'.

Sir David Martin opened the Glengarry Outdoor Campus at his alma mater one year before his death on 14 May, 1989. The first student intake starting the same year.

Just three days before his death, Martin resigned as governor due to an advancing medical condition. He made arrangements for the Sir David Martin Foundation to be established, which runs programs that help young homeless and disadvantaged Australians.

Sir David died on 10 August 1990 of pleural mesothelioma, a rare form of lung cancer caused by asbestos, to which he was exposed during his naval career. He engendered much respect and sympathy when seen struggling for breath during the final days of his service as governor.

Martin's life was honoured with a state funeral conducted at St Andrew's Cathedral, Sydney, on 17 August 1990. At the funeral, the Premier of New South Wales Nick Greiner noted:

With the sad passing last week of Sir David Martin, Australia lost one of its most distinguished citizens. After a proud career of public service with the Royal Australian Navy, Sir David made the Office of Governor of New South Wales extremely accessible.

His service in the Royal Australian Navy is commemorated in the Naval Chapel, Garden Island NSW. After his death, Woollahra Council named the former site of HMAS Rushcutter in Rushcutters Bay as the "Sir David Martin Reserve" in his honour.

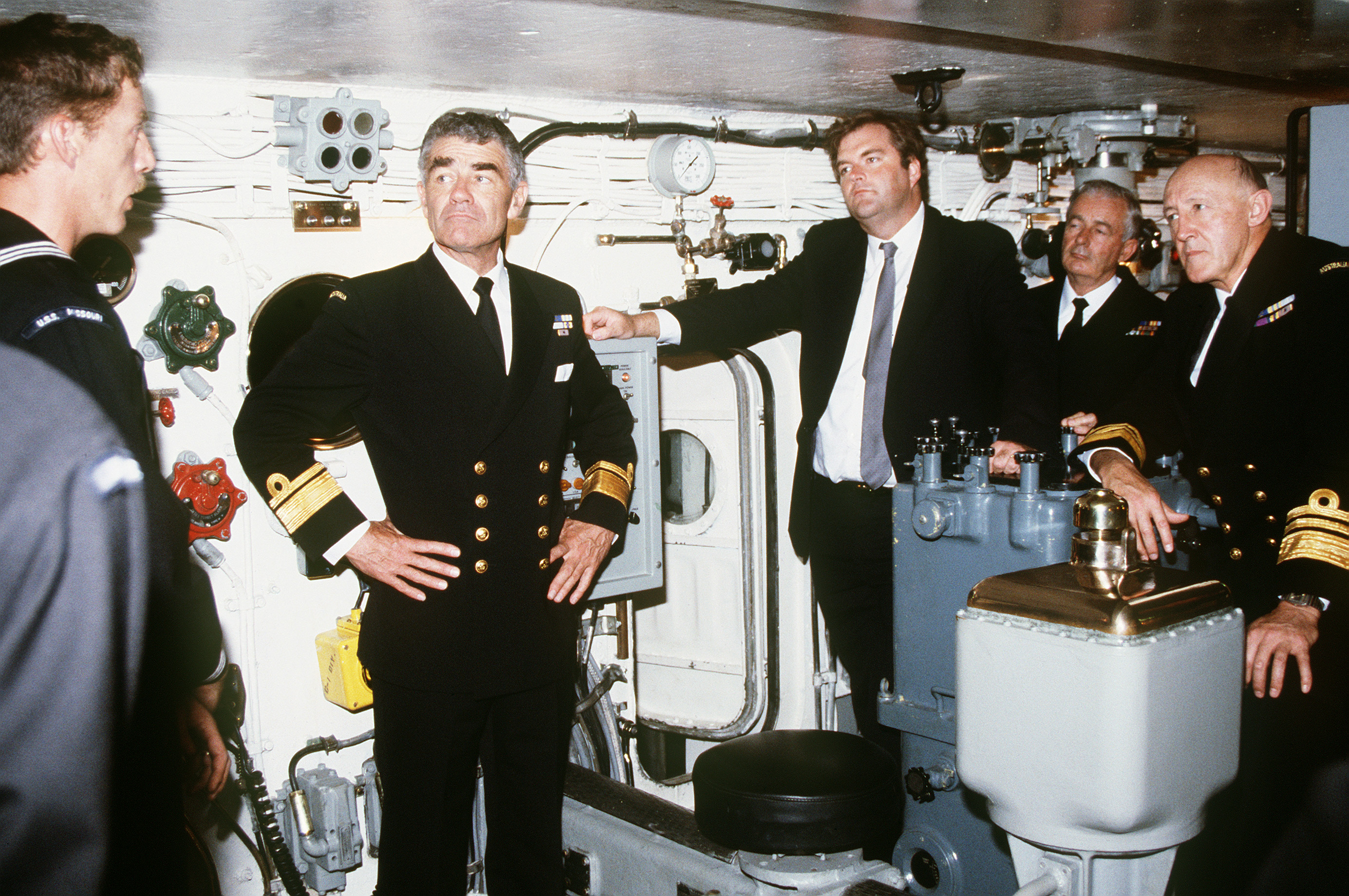
Martin standing beside then Defence Minister Kim Beazley and Chief of Naval Staff Vice Admiral Michael Hudson aboard USS Missouri in 1986.

In December 1990 a JetCat was named in his honour by the State Transit Authority.

== Honours ==
Knight Commander of the Order of St Michael and St George (KCMG)	1988
Officer of the Order of Australia (AO)	1985
Knight of Justice of the Venerable Order of St John of Jerusalem (KStJ)	1989
Korea Medal	
United Nations Service Medal for Korea	
Defence Force Service Medal with 40-year federation star	
National Medal with First clasp	1977, 1978

Military offices
Preceded by Rear Admiral David Leach	Chief of Naval Personnel; 1982–1984	Succeeded by Rear Admiral William Crossley
Preceded by Rear Admiral Kaye Vonthethoff	Flag Officer, Naval Support Command; 1984–1988	Succeeded by Rear Admiral Tony Horton
Government offices
Preceded by Sir James Rowland	Governor of New South Wales; 1989–1990	Succeeded by Peter Sinclair
