= John Lord (admiral) =

- Born: 10 November 1949 (age 76); Subiaco, Western Australia
- Military career
- Allegiance: Australia
- Branch: Royal Australian Navy
- Service years: 1965–2001
- Rank: Rear Admiral
- Commands: Maritime Commander Australia (1999–00); Northern Command (1994–97); HMAS Hobart (1991–92); HMAS Adelaide (1987–88)
- Conflicts: Vietnam War; Operation Morris Dance
- Awards: Member of the Order of Australia

Rear Admiral John Robert Lord, AM (born 10 November 1949) is a retired senior officer of the Royal Australian Navy who served as Maritime Commander Australia from 1999 to 2000. He later embarked on a corporate career, and is Chairman of Huawei Australia.

== Early years ==
Lord was born on 10 November 1949 in Subiaco, a suburb of Perth, Western Australia. He was educated in Perth and Kalgoorlie.

== Naval career ==
Lord entered the Royal Australian Naval College as a cadet midshipman in 1965, and on graduation in 1968 was awarded the Queen's Medal for "exhibiting the most exemplary conduct, performance of duty and good influence among his peers at the college". His sea training was in HMAS Queenborough, HMAS Sydney and HMAS Derwent.

After promotion to sub-lieutenant in December 1969, Lord undertook courses at Britannia Royal Naval College in the United Kingdom from early 1970. He returned to Australia later that year and was appointed to the guided missile destroyer HMAS Brisbane, and saw active service during the ship's deployment on the 'gun-line' in Vietnamese waters during March–October 1971. He was promoted lieutenant in November 1971 and became the Executive Officer of the patrol boat HMAS Aitape operating in Papua New Guinea waters. Lord served as Flag Lieutenant to the Chief of Naval Staff, Vice Admiral David Stevenson, in 1973–74.

Lord again studied in the United Kingdom, qualifying as a warfare and navigation specialist. He then served as navigating and operations officer in HMAS Vendetta, HMAS Hobart and HMAS Supply. Vendetta deployed to Darwin, Northern Territory, in early 1975 to assist with the aftermath of Cyclone Tracy. He also completed staff postings with the Commander Mine Warfare and Patrol Boat Forces and Fleet Commander.

Promoted lieutenant commander in November 1979, Lord completed the advanced navigation course in 1980 and, after promotion to commander, the Joint Services Staff Course in Canberra in 1983. Following this Lord served in the Directorate of Naval Officers Postings in Navy Office, Canberra.

Lord served as commanding officer of the guided missile frigate HMAS Adelaide in April 1987. The ship took part in Operation Morris Dance following the military coup in Fiji that year and was standing by to evacuate Australian nationals if required. He spent only a year in command of Adelaide and, on promotion to captain in June 1998 returned to Navy Office firstly as the director naval officers postings and then as director combat force development.

Lord served as the commanding officer of the guided missile destroyer HMAS Hobart during May 1991 to November 1992, the highlight being the ship's deployment to Exercise RIMPAC 92 including a visit to Naval Base San Diego, San Diego, California.

In 1993, Lord attended the Royal College of Defence Studies in London. He was promoted commodore and on returning to Australia, in early 1994, he was appointed Commodore Flotillas in Maritime Command and then in December of that year became commander Northern Command, based in Darwin, Northern Territory. During 1995 he commanded the Blue force during Exercise Kangaroo 95.

Lord was promoted rear admiral on 11 February 1997 and appointed Naval Training Commander and then the Head Joint Education and Training for the period 1998–99. He was appointed as a Member of the Order of Australia in the Australia Day Honours of 1999 for "exceptional service to the Royal Australian Navy and the Australian Defence Force as the Commodore Flotillas at Maritime Command Headquarters, and as Commander Northern Command".

Lord's last appointment was as the Maritime Commander Australia during 1999–2000. This period had several RAN warships deployed to East Timor in support of Operations Warden, Stabilise and Tanager. He retired from the RAN in 2001.

== Recent interests ==
In more recent years, Lord has worked as an advisor to senior government agencies and acted as a mentor for business executives.

Lord has also held several directorships, including with P&O Maritime Services, Australian Maritime Systems, the Singapore-based Austen Maritime Services and the Marine Board of Victoria.

Lord is currently the Chairman and Independent Director of Huawei Australia (part of the Chinese telecommunications and networking company).

Military offices
Preceded by Rear Admiral Chris Ritchie	Maritime Commander Australia; 1999–2000	Succeeded by Rear Admiral Geoffrey Smith
