= Chris Ritchie =

Royal Australian Navy officer (born 1949)

Christopher Angus Ritchie
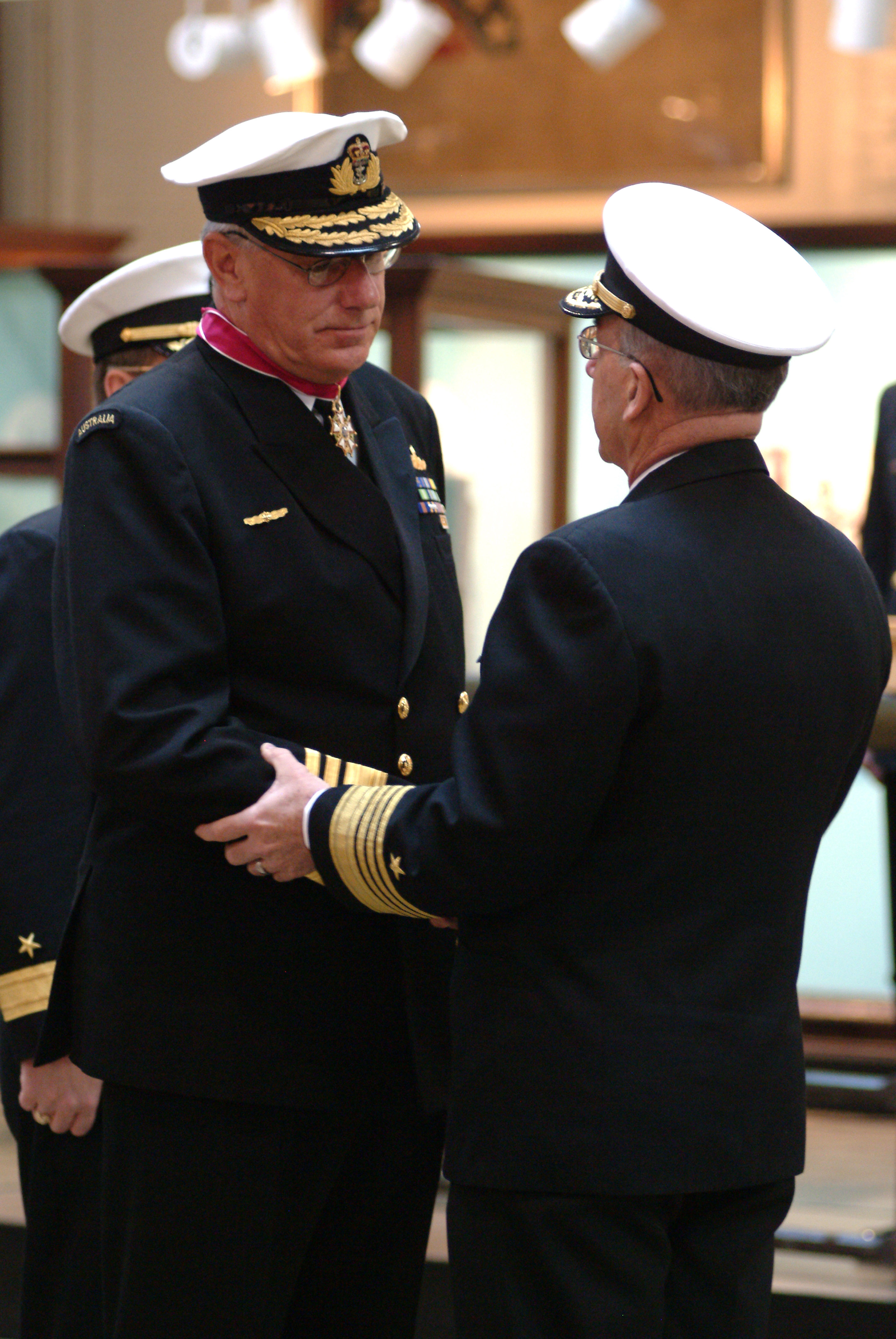
- Vice Admiral Chris Ritchie (left) receives an award from Admiral Vern Clark, U.S. Chief of Naval Operations, February 2003
- Born: 16 January 1949 (age 77); Melbourne, Victoria
- Military career
- Allegiance: Australia
- Branch: Royal Australian Navy
- Service years: 1968–2005
- Rank: Vice Admiral
- Commands: Chief of Navy (2002–05); Deputy Chief of Navy (1999); Maritime Commander Australia (1997–99); HMAS Brisbane (1990–91); HMAS Torrens (1986–87); HMAS Tarakan (1973–74)
- Conflicts: Vietnam War; Gulf War
- Awards: Officer of the Order of Australia; Legion of Merit (United States)
- Other work: Patron of the Australasian Hydrographic Society

Vice Admiral Christopher Angus Ritchie AO (born 16 January 1949) is a retired senior officer of the Royal Australian Navy, who served as Chief of Navy from 2002 to 2005.

== Early life ==
Ritchie was born in Melbourne on 16 January 1949 to Angus Lachlan Ritchie and Colleen Burnice Ritchie.

== Naval career ==
Ritchie graduated from the RAN College at Jervis Bay in 1968. He received further training at sea and in the United Kingdom before undertaking a succession of seagoing appointments and a staff appointment at the NATO School of Maritime Operations at HMS DRYAD. His commands have included HMAS Tarakan, HMAS Torrens, and HMAS Brisbane.

During his period in command of HMAS Brisbane, the ship deployed to the Persian Gulf where she participated for the duration of the Persian Gulf War. In 1991, as a result of this service, he was appointed a Member of the Order of Australia.

In 1992 he attended the Royal College of Defence Studies in the United Kingdom. On completion of this course he was promoted to commodore and had appointments in Naval Policy and Warfare, and Military Strategy and Concepts. In 1997 he was promoted to rear admiral and appointed as Maritime Commander Australia. He then served as Deputy Chief of Navy and Head of Capability Systems.

As a consequence of his service in these appointments, and in addition to receiving the Centenary medal, he was promoted to Officer of the Order of Australia in January 2001. He was promoted to vice admiral and appointed Commander Australian Theatre on 3 August 2001. He was the first Commander to have previously served as a Component Commander to the Headquarters. He assumed command of the Royal Australian Navy from Chief of Navy (CN) Vice Admiral David Shackleton on 3 July 2002 and retired in July 2005.

== After military service ==
In 2018, Vice Admiral Chris Ritchie was reported as a spokesman for Shipbuilder Lurssen Australia who would be building new offshore patrol vessels.

Military offices
Preceded by Vice Admiral David Shackleton	Chief of Navy; 2002–2005	Succeeded by Vice Admiral Russ Shalders
Preceded by Rear Admiral Chris Oxenbould	Deputy Chief of Navy; 1999	Succeeded by Rear Admiral Geoffrey Smith
Preceded by Rear Admiral Chris Oxenbould	Maritime Commander Australia; 1997–1999	Succeeded by Rear Admiral John Lord
