= Russ Crane =

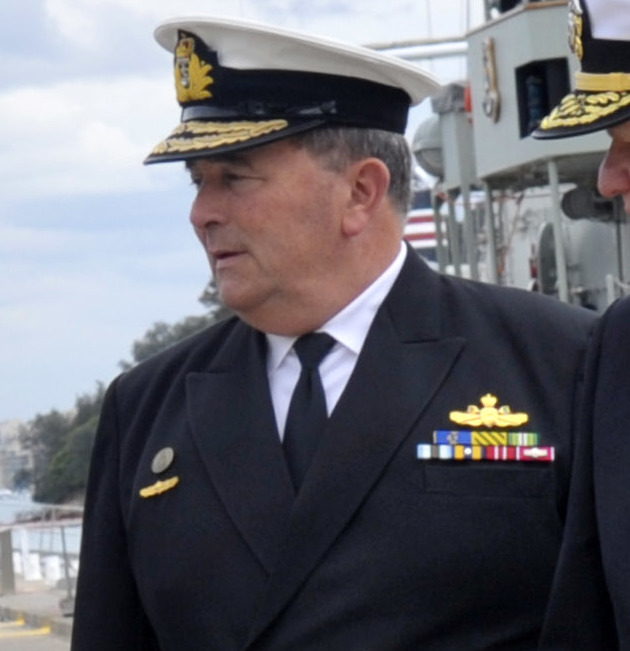
- Vice Admiral Crane in 2010
- Born: 11 June 1954 (age 72); Southport, Queensland, Australia
- Military career
- Allegiance: Australia
- Branch: Royal Australian Navy
- Service years: 1970–2011
- Rank: Vice Admiral
- Commands: Chief of Navy (2008–11); Deputy Chief of Navy (2006–08); Joint Offshore Protection Command (2005–06); HMAS Success (1998–00); HMAS Derwent (1993–94); HMAS Curlew (c. 1983–85)
- Conflicts: International Force for East Timor
- Awards: Officer of the Order of Australia; Conspicuous Service Medal; Commander of the Legion of Merit (United States); Meritorious Service Medal (Singapore); Commander of the National Order of Merit (France)

Vice Admiral Russell Harry Crane, AO, CSM (born 11 June 1954) is a retired senior officer of the Royal Australian Navy (RAN), who served as the Chief of Navy from July 2008 until his retirement in June 2011.

== Early life ==
Crane was born in Southport, Queensland, on 11 June 1954 to Harry and Nina Crane. During his early teenage years, Crane was a cadet enlisted at the Naval Reserve Cadet unit "TS Tyalgum" at Main Beach on the Gold Coast.

== Naval career ==
Crane began his naval career as a junior recruit at HMAS Leeuwin in 1970. Training as an Electrical Mechanic in aircraft communications, he was posted aboard the aircraft carrier HMAS Melbourne in 1971. Following selection for officer training in 1972, he began training as a Seaman Officer serving in numerous RAN establishments and ships, before receiving his commission. He was appointed as Minehunting Control Officer in the minehunter HMAS Curlew, in 1978 and promoted to lieutenant during the same year. In 1983 he was promoted to lieutenant commander and appointed in command of Curlew. He was later appointed as the executive officer of the destroyer escort HMAS Torrens, then in 1988, promoted to commander and posted to the Equipment Acquisition Division in Navy Office Canberra.

In 1993, Crane was posted as the commanding officer aboard HMAS Derwent, a destroyer escort based in Western Australia. He was promoted to captain in January 1996 and appointed as the Chief Staff Officer Command and Control, Communications and Intelligence in Maritime Headquarters. Captain Crane assumed command of HMAS Success on 24 November 1998. During his period in command Success conducted a number of deployments to the South East Asia region including, in September and October 1999, Operation Stabilise in support of peacekeeping operations in East Timor.

Awarded the Conspicuous Service Medal in early 2000 for his time in command HMAS Success, Crane was promoted to commodore in March 2000 and posted to Australian Defence Headquarters in Canberra as the Director General Intelligence, Surveillance, Reconnaissance and Electronic Warfare. He was Commander Australian Navy Systems Command from October 2001 before being promoted to rear admiral on 1 May 2004 and assuming duties as Director General Coastwatch and the inaugural Commander of the newly formed Joint Offshore Protection Command in March 2005. Crane became the Deputy Chief of Navy in June 2006, and was awarded a Member of the Order of Australia in June 2007.

Crane was promoted to vice admiral and succeeded Vice Admiral Russ Shalders as Chief of Navy on 4 July 2008. For his "distinguished service as Deputy Chief of Navy and as Chief of Navy", Crane was appointed an Officer of the Order of Australia in the 2010 Australia Day Honours. In February 2011, the RAN under Crane was embroiled in controversy when the Australian Defence Force was left with a critically reduced amphibious capability. Analysts claimed that a critical naval capability had been allowed to deteriorate to the point of failure.

On 24 May 2011, Crane was conferred Singapore's Meritorious Service Medal by Minister for Defence Ng Eng Hen at an investiture held at the Ministry of Defence. Crane stood down as Chief of Navy and retired from the RAN on 7 June 2011. For a number of personal reasons he specifically requested to retire on this date, nearly one month earlier than the intended 4 July Defence Chiefs change over, and five weeks prior to Crane's 41st anniversary of service with the RAN. He was presented with the French National Order of Merit by Vice Admiral Stephane Verwaerde, Deputy Chief of the French Navy, on 17 May 2013.

== Honours and awards ==

Ribbon	Description	Notes
	Officer of the Order of Australia (AO)	Awarded January 2010
	Member of the Order of Australia (AM)	Awarded June 2007
	Conspicuous Service Medal (CSM)	Awarded June 2000
	Australian Active Service Medal	with "EAST TIMOR" clasp
	International Force East Timor Medal	
	Defence Force Service Medal with 5 clasps/Federation Star	40–44 years service
	Australian Defence Medal	
	Commander of the Legion of Merit	(United States)
	Meritorious Service Medal	(Singapore) – 24 May 2011
	Commander of the National Order of Merit	(France) – 17 May 2013

Military offices
Preceded by Vice Admiral Russ Shalders	Chief of Navy; 2008–2011	Succeeded by Vice Admiral Ray Griggs
Preceded by Rear Admiral Max Hancock	Deputy Chief of Navy; 2006–2008	Succeeded by Rear Admiral Davyd Thomas
