= Alan Beaumont =

Australian Navy officer (1934–2004)

Alan Lee Beaumont
- Official portrait of Admiral Alan Beaumont as Chief of the Defence Force
- Born: 24 December 1934; Newcastle, New South Wales
- Died: 21 September 2004 (aged 69); Canberra, Australian Capital Territory
- Military career
- Allegiance: Australia
- Branch: Royal Australian Navy
- Service years: 1948–1995
- Rank: Admiral
- Commands: Chief of the Defence Force (1993–95); Vice Chief of the Defence Force (1989–92); HMAS Vampire (1978–79); HMAS Yarra (1972–73); HMAS Ibis (1962)
- Conflicts: Vietnam War
- Awards: Companion of the Order of Australia
- Other work: President of the Multiple Sclerosis Society of the ACT

Admiral Alan Lee Beaumont, AC (24 December 1934 – 21 September 2004) was a senior officer in the Royal Australian Navy, whose career culminated with his appointment as Chief of the Defence Force from 1993 to 1995.

== Early life ==
Alan Lee Beaumont was born on 24 December 1934 in Newcastle, New South Wales. He was educated at Boolaroo Public School and Newcastle Technical High School.

== Military career ==
Beaumont joined the Royal Australian Naval College in 1948, graduating in 1951.

He trained with the Royal Navy and Royal Australian Navy before being promoted to lieutenant in 1956. He completed a Torpedo Anti-Submarine specialist course with the Royal Navy between 1959 and 1960, and later served periods of exchange service with the Royal Navy and United States Navy as a specialist in the field.

As a lieutenant commander, Beaumont served as Executive Officer on HMAS Brisbane during a seven-month Vietnam War tour in 1969. He was promoted to commander for his service in this position, and posted as Officer-in-Charge HMAS Watson.

Beaumont commanded HMAS Ibis in 1962, HMAS Yarra between 1972 and 1973, and HMAS Vampire between 1978 and 1979.

Staff postings in Canberra followed, including Director of Underwater Weapons, Follow-on Destroyer Project Officer, Director of Naval Plans, Director General Naval Plans and Policy and President of Officers Selection Boards. For his service as Director of Naval Plans, Beaumont was appointed a Member of the Order of Australia (AM) in the Australia Day Honours list of 1982.

Beaumont was appointed Chief of Staff to the Flag Officer Naval Support Command in January 1987, later being promoted to rear admiral in June and assuming the duties of Assistant Chief of Naval Staff (Development). He was appointed to the post of Assistant Chief of the Defence Force (Personnel) on 5 December 1988, and appointed an Officer of the Order of Australia (AO) in the 1989 Queen's Birthday Honours list.

Promoted to vice admiral on 11 September 1989, Beaumont assumed the appointment of Vice Chief of the Defence Force, serving in this position until October 1992. For his distinguished command in this position, Beaumont was appointed a Companion of the Order of Australia (AC) in the Australia Day Honours List of 1992, becoming the first person to receive three awards of the Order of Australia.

Beaumont was promoted to admiral on 17 April 1993 and commenced his appointment as Chief of the Defence Force (CDF). Beaumont retired from the Royal Australian Navy on 6 July 1995, and was succeeded as CDF by General John Baker.

== Later life ==
Between 2000 and 2003, Beaumont served as President of the Multiple Sclerosis Society of the ACT.

He died on 21 September 2004. He is survived by his second wife, Justine, and four children from a previous marriage to Noreen, who had widowed him.

== Honours and awards ==

Companion of the Order of Australia (AC)	(1992)
Officer of the Order of Australia (AO)	(1989)
Member of the Order of Australia (AM)	(1982)
Australian Active Service Medal 1945–1975	With 1 clasp
Vietnam Medal	
Australian Service Medal 1945–1975	With 1 clasp
Centenary Medal	2001
Defence Force Service Medal with Federation Star (5 clasps)	(40–44 years service)
National Medal with 2 clasps	
Vietnam Campaign Medal	
Unidentified Foreign Cross	
Unidentified Foreign Cross	

Military offices
Preceded by General Peter Gration	Chief of the Defence Force; 1993–1995	Succeeded by General John Baker
Preceded by Vice Admiral Ian Knox	Vice Chief of the Defence Force; 1989–1992	Succeeded by Lieutenant General John Baker
