= Richard Peek (admiral) =

Sir Richard Peek
- Vice Admiral Sir Richard Peek
- Born: Richard Innes Peek; 30 July 1914; Tamworth, New South Wales
- Died: 28 August 2010 (aged 96); Canberra, Australian Capital Territory
- Military career
- Allegiance: Australia
- Branch: Royal Australian Navy
- Service years: 1928–1974
- Rank: Vice Admiral
- Nickname: Peter
- Commands: First Naval Member; HM Australian Fleet; HMAS Melbourne; HMAS Sydney; HMAS Tobruk; HMAS Bataan; HMAS Shoalhaven
- Conflicts: Second World War; Battle of the Coral Sea; Battle of Leyte Gulf; Invasion of Lingayen Gulf; Korean War; Malayan Emergency
- Awards: Knight Commander of the Order of the British Empire; Companion of the Order of the Bath; Distinguished Service Cross; Legion of Merit (United States)

Vice Admiral Sir Richard Innes Peek KBE, CB, DSC (30 July 1914 – 28 August 2010) was a senior officer in the Royal Australian Navy, who served as First Naval Member of the Australian Commonwealth Naval Board from 1970 to 1973.

== Naval career ==
Peek joined the Royal Australian Navy College in 1928 as a cadet midshipman and graduated with maximum honours. His specialist gunnery training followed, with the Royal Navy as was typical of the era, at Whale Island, Portsmouth. He was consolidating his training as a gunnery officer, serving in the battleship HMS Revenge, at the outbreak of the Second World War.

In 1941 he returned to Australia and served as a lieutenant gunnery officer in HMAS Hobart (Leander-class light cruiser) at the Battle of the Coral Sea, and later HMAS Australia (County-class cruiser) until 1944. While serving in HMAS Australia, Peek was injured during the kamikaze attack at the Battle of Leyte Gulf—that took the lives of Captain Emile Dechaineux and thirty others—and for his efforts immediately after was made an Officer of the Order of the British Empire for his "Skill, determination and courage" during the battle. Peek was additionally decorated with the Distinguished Service Cross for "Gallantry and skill" during assault operations on the Lingayan Gulf.

Lieutenant Commander Richard Peek. Artist: Geoffrey Mainwaring

Lieutenant Commander Peek was posted to England after the war to undertake the Staff Course at the Royal Naval College, Greenwich, and also led the RAN contingent at the London victory celebrations on 8 June 1946, then the following year he attended the Joint Services Staff College.

After return to Australia Peek served in various positions before his promotion to commander. From 1951 he served as commanding officer of HMAS Shoalhaven (River-class frigate) and commander of the First Frigate Squadron, before going on to command HMAS Bataan. During the Korean War, he commanded the destroyer HMAS Tobruk and for his service was awarded the United States' Legion of Merit.

From 1954 he served as Deputy Chief of Naval Personnel. After promotion to captain he again commanded HMAS Tobruk from 1956 to 1958 and was also Captain (Destroyers) of the 10th Destroyer Squadron. The ship was part of the Malayan Emergency response. He was again posted to the Admiralty, and he also completed the 1961 course at the Imperial Defence College. From 1962 he commanded the aircraft carrier HMAS Sydney, and then the aircraft carrier and RAN flagship HMAS Melbourne.

In 1964 he was promoted to rear admiral and appointed as the Fourth Naval Member and Chief of Supply of the Australian Commonwealth Naval Board. From 1965 to 1967, he was Deputy Chief of Naval Staff, and from 1967 was Flag Officer Commanding HM Australian Fleet, which included oversight of the British Commonwealth's Far East Strategic Reserve. During this period the RAN first participated in naval bombardment operations against North Vietnam, beginning with HMAS Hobart. In 1968, Peek was appointed as Second Naval Member and Chief of Personnel.

Rear Admiral Peek (right) with Vice Admiral John Hyland, Commander US Pacific Fleet, onboard HMAS Hobart, Vietnam, 1967.

Peek was promoted to vice admiral in 1970 on appointment as First Naval Member. On 1 January 1971, he was appointment as a Companion of the Order of the Bath. He was further honoured, on 1 January 1972, when he was knighted via appointment as a Knight Commander of the Order of the British Empire. During his three-year tenure, the RAN's involvement in the Vietnam War ended, and he was heavily involved in restructuring the Navy as a result of the decision by the Whitlam government to combine the separate departments of the Navy, Army, and Air into the Department of Defence. Plans were well advanced for an Australian light destroyer (designated "DDL") and an RAN replenishment ship. The Australian government changed in 1972 and, due to the new Whitlam government's opposition to the planned DDL project, in August 1973 Peek advised the Government to not proceed.

== Retirement and later life ==
Peek retired on 22 November 1973, and became a pastoralist in Monaro district of southern New South Wales near Cooma. He remained active in naval and military affairs, and campaigned for the welfare of veterans. His many activities included:

- Navy League of Australia - member, Advisory Council
- In 2002, aged 87, he gave evidence at the Australian Senate inquiry into the "Children Overboard affair", vigorously defending Commander Norm Banks, Commanding Officer of HMAS Adelaide and the crew.
- Championing the Far East Strategic Reserve Association.
- Patron of "A Just Australia", a lobby group for just policies and programs for refugees and asylum seekers
- In 2009, provided expert advice to the Australian Parliament regarding the 2009 Defence White Paper, Defending Australia in the Asia Pacific Century: Force 2030.

== Family ==
Richard Peek died on 28 August 2010. Peek was predeceased by his first wife, Margaret, and his second wife, Catherine. He was survived by his son Matthew, and daughters Jane and Rachel.

Military offices
Preceded by Vice Admiral Sir Victor Smith	Chief of Naval Staff; 1970–1973	Succeeded by Vice Admiral Sir David Stevenson
Preceded by Rear Admiral Victor Smith	Flag Officer Commanding HM Australian Fleet; 1967–1968	Succeeded by Rear Admiral Gordon Crabb
Preceded by Rear Admiral Thomas Morrison	Deputy Chief of Naval Staff; 1965–1967	Succeeded by Rear Admiral Victor Smith
