= Michael Hudson (admiral) =

Michael Wyndham Hudson
- Vice Admiral Mike Hudson c. late 1980s
- Born: 10 March 1933; Taree, New South Wales
- Died: 27 February 2005 (aged 71); Sydney, New South Wales
- Military career
- Allegiance: Australia
- Branch: Royal Australian Navy
- Service years: 1947–1991
- Rank: Admiral
- Commands: Chief of Naval Staff (1985–91); HM Australian Fleet (1982–83); HMAS Melbourne (1981–82); HMAS Stalwart (1976–77); HMAS Brisbane (1974–75); HMAS Vendetta (1970–71)
- Conflicts: Korean War; Indonesia-Malaysia confrontation Vietnam War
- Awards: Companion of the Order of Australia
- Other work: National President of the Naval Association of Australia

Admiral Michael Wyndham "Mike" Hudson AC (10 March 1933 – 27 February 2005) was a senior officer in the Royal Australian Navy (RAN), particularly notable for playing an important role in the introduction of the Collins class submarines and Anzac Class frigates, and establishing two-ocean basing for ships of the RAN during his tenure as Chief of Naval Staff from 1985 to 1991.

== Early life ==
Michael Hudson was born on 10 March 1933 in Taree, New South Wales. His family moved to the Sydney suburb of Mosman when he was of a young age, where he developed an early interest in the navy, frequently watching the naval shipping from Balmoral. His first year of secondary schooling was spent at North Sydney Boys High School.

== Service history ==
Hudson joined the Royal Australian Naval College as a 13 year old cadet midshipman in January 1947. His class was to prove a high achieving one. Out of the 24 cadets, three were to retire from the RAN as commodores, one (Sir David Martin) as a rear admiral and later Governor of New South Wales, another (Ian Knox) as a vice admiral and Vice Chief of the Defence Force, while Hudson became an admiral and Chief of Naval Staff.

Graduating in 1950 with the King's Medal as dux of his class, Hudson decided to specialise in navigation. As a midshipman, he was posted to HMAS Sydney, which included a six-month deployment for service in the Korean War.

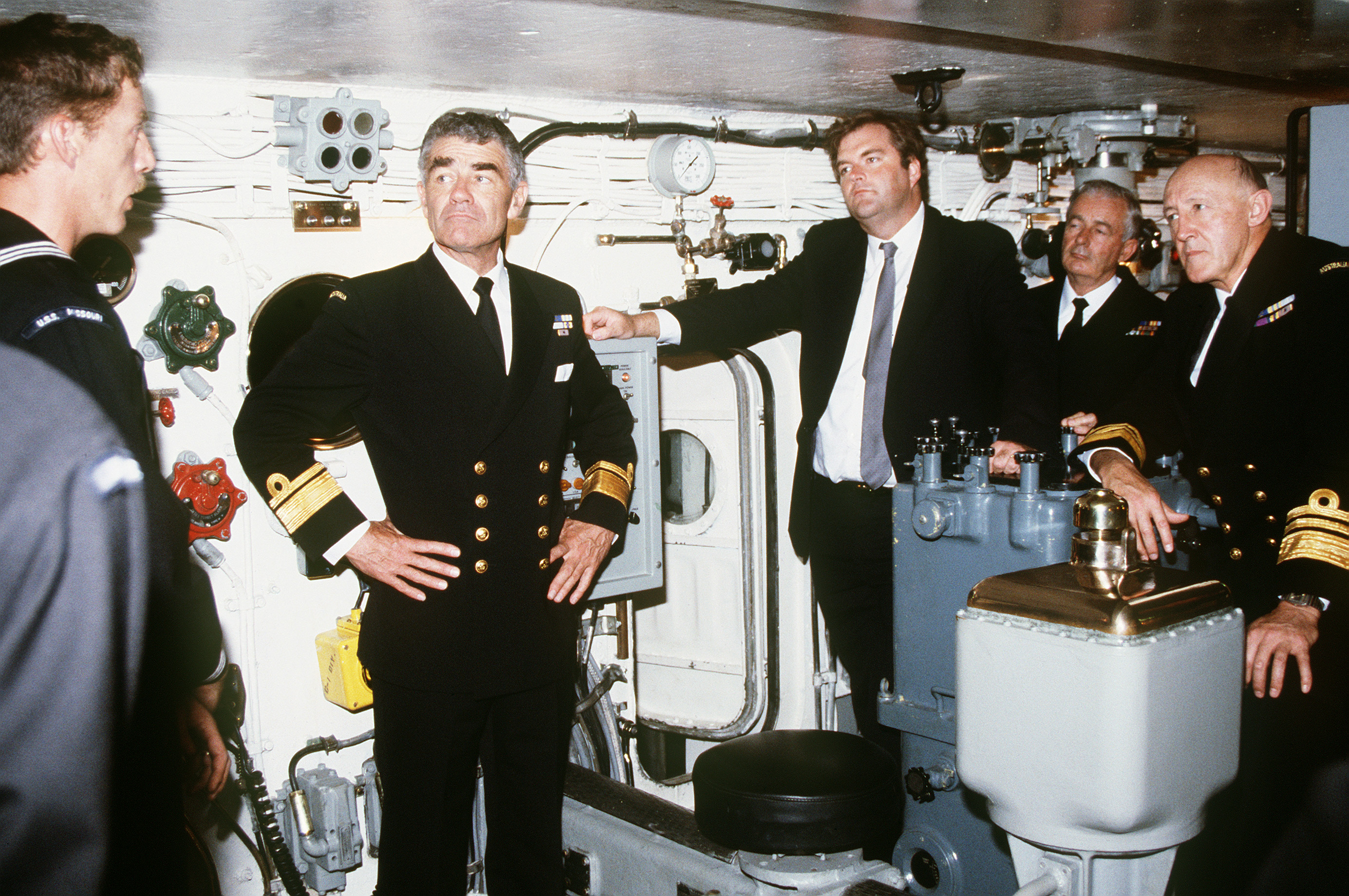
On board the USS Missouri in September 1986. Left to right: a US seaman, David Martin, Kim Beazley, Ian Knox and Hudson.

Hudson proceeded to command HMA Ships Brisbane, Stalwart, Melbourne, and Vendetta, which included a posting as Fleet Operations Officer during the Vietnam War, having previously served a tour in the Indonesia-Malaysia confrontation from 1964 to 1966.

Hudson then received a series of staff appointments in the Navy Office, firstly as Director of Naval Plans, later becoming Director of Naval Plans and Policy. He then assumed the position of Flag Officer Commanding Her Majesty's Australian Fleet. On 11 June 1984 he was appointed an Officer of the Order of Australia for his service in this position.

Hudson was promoted to vice admiral and was appointed Chief of Naval Staff on 21 April 1985. During his tenure, he signed contracts for the replacement of Collins class submarines, ANZAC class frigates and the Paluma class survey vessels. Also during this period, naval infrastructure was overhauled, Two-Ocean Basing commenced, and service conditions were improved. He was appointed a Companion of the Order of Australia on 13 June 1987.

To honour his distinguished forty-four years of service to the Navy, Prime Minister Bob Hawke promoted Hudson to the rank of admiral on the day of his retirement, 8 March 1991.

== Later life ==
In retirement, Hudson took an active interest in the welfare of naval veterans and serving personnel. He served as National President of the Naval Association of Australia and Chairman of the Australian Veterans' Children Assistance Trust.

Admiral Mike Hudson died at Royal North Shore Hospital, Sydney, on 27 February 2005.

Military offices
Preceded by Vice Admiral David Leach	Chief of Naval Staff; 1985–1991	Succeeded by Vice Admiral Ian MacDougall
Preceded by Rear Admiral John Stevens	Flag Officer Commanding HM Australian Fleet; 1982–1983	Succeeded by Rear Admiral Geoffrey Woolrych
