= Rodney Taylor =

Australian naval officer

Rodney Graham Taylor
- Born: 11 June 1940; Toowoomba, Queensland
- Died: 1 September 2002 (aged 62); Wamboin, New South Wales
- Military career
- Allegiance: Australia
- Branch: Royal Australian Navy
- Service years: 1954–1997
- Rank: Vice Admiral
- Nickname: "Rocket Rod"
- Commands: Chief of Navy (1994–97); Deputy Chief of Naval Staff (1991–94); HMAS Torrens; Third Australian Destroyer Squadron; HMAS Vampire (1979–80)
- Conflicts: Vietnam War; Gulf War
- Awards: Officer of the Order of Australia; Mentioned in Despatches; Pingat Jasa Gemilang (Tentera) (Singapore)

Vice Admiral Rodney Graham Taylor, AO (11 June 1940 – 1 September 2002) was a senior officer in the Royal Australian Navy, serving as Chief of Navy from 1994 to 1997. Born in Queensland, Taylor entered the Royal Australian Naval College at the age of thirteen. Graduating as dux of his year in 1957, he later specialised in navigation and served during the Vietnam War. Commanding HMAS Vampire as well as HMAS Torrens, Taylor planned and coordinated the deployment of Australian ships during the Gulf War. Retiring from the navy in 1997, Taylor died from lung cancer in 2002 at the age of 62.

== Early life ==
Taylor was born in the Queensland town of Toowoomba on 11 June 1940, the second son of Len and Vera Taylor. In 1954, Taylor joined the Royal Australian Naval College at the land base HMAS Cerberus; he was one of the last officers to enlist in the Royal Australian Navy as a thirteen-year-old. During his time at the college, Taylor excelled academically as well as in cricket and rugby.

== Naval career ==
=== Early service ===
In December 1957, Taylor graduated from the Royal Australian Naval College and was awarded the Queen’s Medal as dux of his year as well as the Grand Aggregate Prize, and was commissioned as a sub-lieutenant in the Royal Australian Navy. Completing a period of training at sea aboard HMAS Swan, Taylor was posted to England for further instruction at the Royal Naval College, Dartmouth, from which he graduated in 1959.

Returning to Australia, Taylor joined HMAS Quiberon. While on board the ship, he decided to specialise in navigation. Described as "meticulous and deliberate" with "self-confidence", on one occasion Taylor, realising that the fleet would be approximately two hours late arriving at Sydney Heads, on his own initiative signalled the Fleet Navigator from Quiberon who promptly adjusted the time of arrival. Later posted aboard HMAS Anzac, Taylor met Judy Smith, a Melbourne-born Qantas air hostess, in 1963; the couple married the following year, and were later to have a son named Sean.

Following his wedding, Taylor proceeded to England in order to complete a long navigation course. On finishing this stint, he was allocated as navigator of the Royal Navy's 7th Mine Countermeasures Squadron based on Malta. During 1967, Taylor, by now holding the rank of lieutenant commander, was posted to the United States to serve as the commissioning navigator and operations officer of the destroyer HMAS Brisbane. During his service on Brisbane, the ship was deployed to assist in operations off Vietnam in March 1969. Brisbane's stint during the Vietnam War was to last seven months, for which Taylor was to receive a Mention in Despatches for his performance.

Posted back to Australia, Taylor was appointed to the staff of the Naval College at HMAS Creswell in Jervis Bay. Early in 1972, Taylor was returned to Britain in order to complete the advanced navigation course at HMS Dryad. Finalising his instruction later that year, Taylor was appointed navigator aboard HMAS Sydney, which was then engaged in logistic support of Australian forces in Vietnam, and involved a monthlong stint in the theatre for Taylor during November. He later became navigator on HMAS Melbourne.

Promoted to commander, Taylor received an exchange posting to the Royal Navy as commander of the amphibious warfare section at the Joint Warfare Establishment in Old Sarum. As his exchange stint concluded, Taylor returned to Australia and was made director of tactics and navigation at the Navy Office. Completing a course at the Joint Services Staff College, Taylor was appointed to command HMAS Vampire in 1979. He captained the destroyer until 1980, during which time he learnt every member of the ship's company by name and was known among the crew as "Rocket Rod".

=== Senior command ===
Over the following twelve years, Taylor held a series of appointments that held the main focus on operations. Initially serving as fleet operations officer, he was later posted as director of naval development. In 1985, Taylor attended the National Defence College of Canada. On his return to Australia, he commanded HMAS Torrens. Reposted as Commander Third Australian Destroyer Squadron, Taylor was promoted to commodore and became Deputy Fleet Commander. He later served a stint as Commodore Flotillas. For his services as Deputy Fleet Commander and Commodore Flotillas, Taylor was appointed a Member of the Order of Australia in the 1989 Queen's Birthday Honours List.

During 1990, Taylor was promoted to rear admiral and made Assistant Chief of Defence Force (Operations). Taylor's appointment to this position coincided with the commencement of the Gulf War, and as such he planned and coordinated the deployment of Royal Australian Navy ships to the Persian Gulf for service as part of Operation Desert Storm. During this time, Taylor was required to work closely with the Australian Government and became "adept at briefing the PM, ministers and other VIP visitors to the ops room". In November 1991, he was posted as Deputy Chief of Naval Staff. Taylor was consequently appointed an Officer of the Order of Australia in the 1992 Australia Day Honours List for his efforts as Assistant Chief of Defence Force (Operations) during the Gulf War.

=== Chief of Navy ===
In 1994, Taylor was promoted to vice admiral and appointed Chief of Naval Staff. During his service as head of the Navy, Taylor supervised several major reforms to the service, including the withdrawal of British-built ships and Royal Navy crewed submarines in favour of American-built destroyers and Australian frigates and submarines. He also implemented reforms concerning pay, conditions and rank structure as well as leading the Royal Australian Navy to become more tolerant towards homosexuals and women at sea.

During February 1997, the position of Chief of Naval Staff was renamed as Chief of Navy, which coincided with the release of an efficiency review commissioned by the then Defence Minister. The review reduced the command responsibilities of the three service chiefs, which were instead to reside with the Chief of the Defence Force. Just prior to his retirement, Taylor was able to lessen the impact of some of the reform proposals and advocated that the Collins class submarine project proceed. In June, Taylor was awarded the Pingat Jasa Gemilang (Tentera) from Singapore for his "significant contributions in forging excellent ties and friendship between the Royal Australian Navy (RAN) and the Republic of Singapore Navy (RSN)". He retired from the Navy later that month.

== Retirement ==
Following his retirement from the Navy, Taylor and his wife purchased a property at Wamboin, New South Wales, where they raised alpacas. On 1 September 2002, Taylor died of lung cancer at the age of 62; he had previously undergone heart surgery in 1993.

== Notes ==
Military offices
New command Replaced position of Chief of Naval Staff	Chief of Navy; February – June 1997	Succeeded by Vice Admiral Donald Chalmers
Preceded by Vice Admiral Ian MacDougall	Chief of Naval Staff; 1994–1997	Position replaced by Chief of Navy
Preceded by Rear Admiral Ian MacDougall	Deputy Chief of Naval Staff; 1991–1994	Succeeded by Rear Admiral David Campbell
