= David Shackleton (admiral) =

David John Shackleton
- Born: 2 March 1948 (age 78); Leeds, United Kingdom
- Military career
- Allegiance: Australia
- Branch: Royal Australian Navy
- Service years: 1966–2002
- Rank: Vice Admiral
- Commands: Chief of Navy (1999–02); HMAS Brisbane (1992); HMAS Derwent (1989)
- Conflicts: Vietnam War
- Awards: Officer of the Order of Australia; Commander of the Legion of Merit (United States)

Vice Admiral David John Shackleton AO (born 2 March 1948) is a retired senior officer of the Royal Australian Navy (RAN), who served as Chief of Navy from 1999 to 2002.

== Early life ==
Shackleton was born in Leeds, United Kingdom, on 2 March 1948 to Ernest Shackleton and Elise Wilson. The family immigrated to Australia in 1959 and settled in Adelaide, where Shackleton was educated at Croydon High School.

== Naval career ==
Shackleton joined the Navy in 1966 under Supplementary List (Executive) Scheme, and saw service in Vietnam while qualifying as a seaman officer. He was given command of the destroyer escort HMAS Derwent in 1988, was the Maritime commander for the opposing forces during Exercise Kangaroo 1989, and reached the rank of captain in 1989. He commanded the destroyer HMAS Brisbane from 1991 to 1992, and was promoted to commodore in 1993.

He is a graduate of the RAN Staff College and the Joint Services Staff College, and has earned a Master of Business Administration (executive) from Monash University. He is a Fellow of the Australian Institute of Management and a Fellow of the Australian Institute of Company Directors.

He was promoted to rear admiral in 1998, and then vice admiral and Chief of Navy in 1999. He initiated various organisational changes across the Navy.

He was a senior Navy witness to the Senate Enquiry into the Children overboard affair. He was appointed Officer of the Order of Australia (AO) in 2000, and Commander of the United States Legion of Merit in 2001. He retired from the RAN in 2002.

== Post-naval career ==
Shackleton was appointed to the Defence SA Advisory Board in South Australia in 2007, the year of its establishment.

Military offices
Preceded by Vice Admiral Donald Chalmers	Chief of Navy; 1999–2002	Succeeded by Vice Admiral Chris Ritchie
