= Anthony Synnot =

Australian admiral (1922–2001)

Sir Anthony Synnot
- Born: Anthony Monckton Synnot; 5 January 1922; Corowa, New South Wales
- Died: 4 July 2001 (aged 79); Yass, New South Wales
- Military career
- Allegiance: Australia
- Branch: Royal Australian Navy
- Service years: 1939–1982
- Rank: Admiral
- Commands: Chief of Defence Force Staff (1979–82); Chief of Naval Staff (1976–79); HM Australian Fleet (1973–74); HMAS Melbourne (1967); HMAS Sydney (1966); Royal Malaysian Navy (1962–65); HMAS Vampire (1960–61); HMAS Warramunga (1956–57)
- Conflicts: Second World War; Battle of the Mediterranean; Battle of Cape Matapan; Arctic convoys; Indonesia–Malaysia confrontation; Vietnam War
- Awards: Knight Commander of the Order of the British Empire; Officer of the Order of Australia; Mentioned in Despatches; Commander of the Order of the Defender of the Realm (Malaysia)
- Other work: Chairman of the Council of the Australian War Memorial (1982–85)

Admiral Sir Anthony Monckton Synnot, KBE, AO (5 January 1922 – 4 July 2001) was a senior officer in the Royal Australian Navy, who served as Chief of the Defence Force Staff from 1979 to 1982.

== Early life ==
Synnot was born in 1922 at Corowa, New South Wales, a descendant of Monckton Synnot, brother of Captain Timothy Monckton Synnot and a distant relative of the American Saint Elizabeth Ann Seton. Synnot was educated at Geelong Grammar School. He joined the Royal Australian Navy as a cadet midshipman in March 1939 and trained in Britain with Prince Philip of Greece (as he then was). His first ship was the cruiser HMAS Canberra.

== Naval career ==
During the Second World War, Synnot served aboard the destroyer HMAS Stuart in the Battle of Cape Matapan, for which he was mentioned in despatches, and during the evacuation of Greece and Crete. With the Royal Navy, he saw service on the battleship HMS Barham and was on board the destroyer HMS Punjabi when she sank off Iceland in 1942 after being accidentally rammed by the battleship HMS King George V.

Subsequently, Synnot served for two years on the Australian destroyer HMAS Quiberon on North Sea convoy duty and during the North Africa landings, eventually becoming the ship's executive officer. In 1945, Synnot qualified as a gunnery officer and served on the staff of gunnery schools in Australia. Promoted to commander in 1954, he took charge of HMAS Warramunga in 1956. He became captain of the Daring-class destroyer HMAS Vampire in 1960.

In 1950, Synnot had taken part in the Bridgeford Mission to Malaya, which advised the Australian government on the Malayan Emergency. His report on the options for providing naval support for the British laid the foundations for Australian naval involvement in the region and led to Synnot's secondment to command the Royal Malaysian Navy from 1962 to 1965.

On his return to Australia, Synnot attended administrative staff college before returning to sea in 1966 as Captain of the Australian aircraft carrier HMAS Sydney, then in 1967, the carrier HMAS Melbourne. He was the only officer to command both aircraft carriers.

After a year at the Imperial Defence College in London, he returned to Australia as director general of fighting equipment. Promoted to rear-admiral in 1970, he became chief of naval personnel and subsequently deputy chief of naval staff. He became Flag Officer Commanding HM Australian Fleet in 1973. In 1974, he was appointed director joint staff in the Australian Defence Department, and played a leading role in the relief effort following the devastation of Darwin by Cyclone Tracy.

In 1976, Synnot was promoted to vice admiral and appointed Chief of Naval Staff. He initiated a review of the Navy Office and of the Navy's structure of command and control. He drew up a blueprint for the maintenance of naval capability into the future, and oversaw the Navy's guided-missile frigate project.

In April 1979 he was promoted to Admiral and became the Chief of Defence Force Staff, a position he held until his retirement in 1982. Synnot came to be regarded as one of the country's most outstanding defence force chiefs. A strong believer in deterrence and an advocate of close co-operation with America and countries in the Pacific region, Synnot emphasised the need for a strong military capability for national defence and for joint operations with Australia's allies overseas. He was said to have done more to equip Australia's armed forces with up-to-date military technology than any of his predecessors. In particular, he was instrumental in persuading the Australian government of the need to upgrade the country's air force with the acquisition of the F/A-18 Hornet.

He was also behind the decision to acquire the British aircraft carrier HMS Invincible as a replacement for the ageing HMAS Melbourne. However, Britain withdrew the offer to sell Invincible after the Falklands War.

Synnot retired on 20 April 1982.

== Personal ==
Synnot was appointed a Commander of the Order of the British Empire in 1971, and knighted as a Knight Commander of the Order of the British Empire in 1978. He was appointed an Officer of the Order of Australia in 1976. He married Virginia Davenport in 1959 and they remained married until her death in 1965. He married a second time in 1968 to Anne Colvin (née Manifold), great-niece of former Prime Minister of Australia Stanley Bruce and mother of journalist Mark Colvin.

Admiral Sir Anthony Synnot died on 4 July 2001 at the age of 79, after suffering from a long illness and a number of years also suffering total blindness.

Military offices
Preceded by General Sir Arthur MacDonald	Chief of Defence Force Staff; 1979–1982	Succeeded by Air Chief Marshal Sir Neville McNamara
Preceded by Vice Admiral Sir David Stevenson	Chief of Naval Staff; 1976–1979	Succeeded by Vice Admiral Sir James Willis
Preceded by Rear Admiral William Dovers	Flag Officer Commanding HM Australian Fleet; 1973–1974	Succeeded by Rear Admiral David Wells
Preceded by Rear Admiral David Wells	Deputy Chief of Naval Staff; 1971–1972	Succeeded by Rear Admiral William Dovers
