= Russ Shalders =

Admiral of the Royal Australian Navy

Russell Edward Shalders
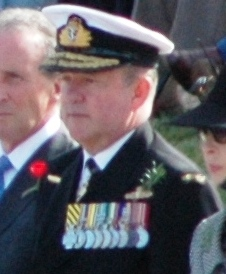
- Vice Admiral Russ Shalders in August 2008
- Born: 28 September 1951 (age 75); Ararat, Victoria
- Military career
- Allegiance: Australia
- Branch: Royal Australian Navy
- Service years: 1967–2008
- Rank: Vice admiral
- Commands: Chief of Navy (2005–08); Vice Chief of the Defence Force (2002–05); HMAS Perth (1993–94); HMAS Darwin (1990–91); HMAS Sydney (1988–89)
- Conflicts: Vietnam War; Gulf War
- Awards: Officer of the Order of Australia; Conspicuous Service Cross; Meritorious Service Medal (Singapore)

Vice Admiral Russell Edward Shalders, AO, CSC (born 28 September 1951) is a retired admiral of the Royal Australian Navy (RAN). He served as vice chief of the Australian Defence Force from 2002 to 2005, and as chief of Navy from 2005 to 2008.

== Early life ==
Shalders was born in Ararat, Victoria, on 28 September 1951 to Kenneth George Shalders, a former army lieutenant who had served with the 2/12th Battalion in the Second World War, and Muriel Jean Shalders.

== Naval career ==
Shalders entered the Royal Australian Naval College at Jervis Bay as a 16-year-old cadet midshipman in 1967. After sea training he undertook operations and weapons courses in the United Kingdom. On returning to Australia, he was posted as executive officer of the patrol boat HMAS Ardent, then joined HMAS Vendetta, before he assumed command of the Papua New Guinea Defence Force patrol boat Samarai.

Shalders then served as divisional officer at the RAN College in 1976, and then in HMAS Perth prior to principal warfare officer training in the UK in 1978. He returned as operations and anti-submarine warfare (ASW) officer aboard HMAS Vendetta, then was an officer's posting officer in Canberra.

After promotion to lieutenant commander in 1981, Shalders completed the Naval Staff Course for International Officers at the Naval War College, Newport, Rhode Island, and then undertook advanced warfare officer training in the UK, specialising in anti-submarine warfare. He joined HMAS Hobart as ASW officer and operations officer in 1982, but completed this posting as executive officer.

In the rank of commander, Shalders served at the RAN Staff College as a member of the Directing Staff from mid-1984. After two years at the embassy in Washington, D.C. in 1986–87, he assumed command of HMAS Sydney and was then appointed as commander, Sea Training.

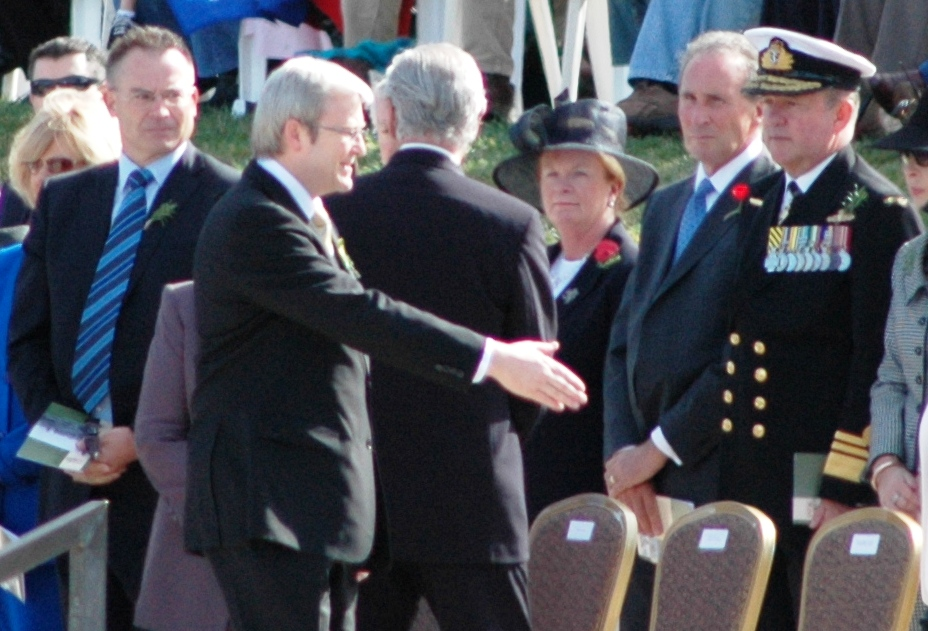
Russ Shalders, then Chief of Navy, is greeted by Prime Minister of Australia Kevin Rudd at the 2008 National Anzac Day service, Australian War Memorial, Canberra.

On promotion to captain, Shalders was posted at short notice to command HMAS Darwin during the Persian Gulf War, and was awarded the Conspicuous Service Cross in recognition of this period in command. In 1991, he became director of naval warfare and subsequently director, general naval policy and warfare. Shalders commanded HMAS Perth in 1993–94 and attended the Royal College of Defence Studies in London in 1995.

On promotion to commodore, Shalders was appointed as director general, joint exercise plans and then director general, operations policy and doctrine and director general, information strategic concepts. He returned to the fleet to become commodore of flotillas in January 1998, responsible for the operational efficiency of all fleet units.

On promotion to rear admiral in July 1999, Shalders was seconded to the Australian Customs Service as the inaugural Director General Coastwatch. He was appointed as head, Defence Personnel Executive in 2001.

Shalders was promoted to vice admiral and appointed as Vice Chief of the Defence Force in July 2002. He was appointed an Officer of the Order of Australia in the Australia Day Honours list of 2003.

On 23 May 2005, the Minister for Defence announced that Shalders would succeed Vice Admiral Chris Ritchie as Chief of Navy from July 2005 for a three-year term. He retired from this position, and the navy, on 4 July 2008.

== Personal ==
In his spare time, Shalders enjoys golf, jogging and gardening.

Shalders' brother, Commodore Richard Shalders, was Commander Australian Navy Submarine Group (CANSG) until his retirement in July 2008.

== References and notes ==
Military offices
Preceded by Vice Admiral Chris Ritchie	Chief of Navy; 2005–2008	Succeeded by Vice Admiral Russell Crane
Preceded by Lieutenant General Desmond Mueller	Vice Chief of the Defence Force; 2002–2005	Succeeded by Lieutenant General Ken Gillespie
