= Timothy Monckton Synnot =

Royal Australian Navy officer (1916–1997)

Timothy Monckton Synnot DSC
- Born: 15 January 1916
- Died: 18 May 1997 (aged 81)
- Relatives: Monckton Synnot (ancestor); Anthony Synnot (brother)
- Military career
- Allegiance: Australia
- Branch: Royal Australian Navy
- Rank: Captain
- Conflicts: World War II

Timothy Monckton Synnot DSC (15 January 1916 – 18 May 1997) was an officer in the Royal Australian Navy. He was a descendant of Monckton Synnot and the older brother of Admiral Anthony Synnot. Having joined the RAN in 1930, he served on HMAS Hobart in World War II, during which he was awarded the Distinguished Service Cross and was mentioned in Despatches (for "good services in operations off the coast of British Somaliland"). He was promoted to commander in 1951 and retired as a captain.

After his naval service Synnot settled at Naberoo, near Keith, in South Australia.
