= Vice admiral (Australia) =

Second-highest active rank of the Royal Australian Navy

- Vice admiral's command flag

- The VADM insignia
- Country: Australia
- Service branch: Royal Australian Navy
- Abbreviation: VADM
- Rank group: Flag officer
- Rank: Three-star
- Non-NATO rank: OF-8
- Pay grade: O-9
- Formation: 12 July 1936
- Next higher rank: Admiral
- Next lower rank: Rear admiral
- Equivalent ranks: Lieutenant general (Army); Air marshal (RAAF)

Vice admiral (abbreviated as VADM) is the second-highest active rank of the Royal Australian Navy (RAN). It is a three-star rank, and was created as a direct equivalent of the British rank of vice admiral. The rank is held by the Chief of Navy and, when the positions are held by navy officers, by the Vice Chief of the Defence Force, the Chief of Joint Operations, the Chief of Joint Capabilities, or equivalent position.

Vice admiral is a higher rank than rear admiral, but lower than admiral. Vice admiral is the equivalent of air marshal in the Royal Australian Air Force and lieutenant general in the Australian Army.

Since the mid-1990s, the insignia of a Royal Australian Navy vice admiral is the Crown of St. Edward above a crossed sabre (Note: Usually in Commonwealth countries a scimitar is used in the insignia, which is an open-handled weapon; the sabre has a closed handle.) and baton, above three silver stars, above the word "AUSTRALIA". The stars have eight points as in the equivalent Royal Navy insignia. Prior to 1995, the RAN shoulder board was identical to the British shoulder board.

== List of vice admirals ==
This along with the * (asterisk) indicates that the officer was subsequently promoted to admiral.
This along with the ^ (arrowhead) indicates that the officer is a currently serving vice admiral.

The following people have held the rank of vice admiral in the Royal Australian Navy:

Name	Year of promotion	Senior command(s) or appointment(s) in rank	Notes
Sir William Creswell	1922 (Note: Creswell, who served as First Naval Member, Australian Commonwealth Naval Board from 1911 to 1919, was promoted to vice admiral on the Retired List in 1922.)		
Sir William Clarkson	1922 (Note: Engineer Rear Admiral Clarkson was transferred to the Retired List with the rank of engineer vice admiral on 1 November 1922)	Third Naval Member (1911–22)	
Sir George Hyde*	1932	First Naval Member and Chief of Staff (1931–37)	
Sir John Collins	1950	First Naval Member and Chief of Staff (1948–55)	
Sir Roy Dowling	1955	First Naval Member and Chief of Staff (1955–59)	
Sir Henry Burrell	1959	First Naval Member and Chief of Staff (1959–62)	
Sir Hastings Harrington	1962	First Naval Member and Chief of Staff (1962–65)	
Sir Alan McNicoll	1965	First Naval Member and Chief of Staff (1965–68)	
Sir Victor Smith*	1968	First Naval Member and Chief of Staff (1968–70)	
Sir Richard Peek	1970	First Naval Member and Chief of Staff (1970–73)	
Sir David Stevenson	1973	First Naval Member and Chief of Staff (1973–76)	
Sir Anthony Synnot*	1976	Chief of Naval Staff (1976–79)	
Sir James Willis	1979	Chief of Naval Staff (1979–82)	
David Leach	1982	Chief of Naval Staff (1982–85)	
Michael Hudson*	1985	Chief of Naval Staff (1985–91)	
Ian Knox	1987	Vice Chief of the Defence Force (1987–89)	
Alan Beaumont*	1989	Vice Chief of the Defence Force (1989–92)	
Ian MacDougall	1991	Chief of Naval Staff (1991–94)	
Rodney Taylor	1991	Chief of Naval Staff (1994–97)	
Robert Walls	1995	Vice Chief of the Defence Force (1995–97)	
Donald Chalmers	1997	Chief of Navy (1997–99)	
Chris Barrie*	1997	Vice Chief of the Defence Force (1997–98)	
David Shackleton	1999	Chief of Navy (1999–2002)	
Chris Ritchie	2002	Chief of Navy (2002–05)	
Russ Shalders	2002	Chief of Navy (2005–08), Vice Chief of the Defence Force (2002–05)	
Matt Tripovich	2007	Chief Capability Development Group (2007–10)	
Russ Crane	2008	Chief of Navy (2008–11)	
Ray Griggs	2011	Vice Chief of the Defence Force (2014–18), Chief of Navy (2011–14)	
Peter Jones	2011	Chief Capability Development Group (2011–14)	
David Johnston*	2014	Vice Chief of the Defence Force (2018–24), Chief of Joint Operations (2014–18)	
Tim Barrett	2014	Chief of Navy (2014–18)	
Michael Noonan	2018	Chief of Navy (2018–22)	
Stuart Mayer	2019	Deputy Commander United Nations Command (2019–21)	
Jonathan Mead^	2020	Director-General of the Australian Submarine Agency (2023–), Chief of the Nuclear-Powered Submarine Task Force (2021–23), Chief of Joint Capabilities (2020–21)	
Mark Hammond*	2022	Chief of Navy (2022–26)	
Justin Jones^	2024	Chief of Joint Operations (2024–)	
Matt Buckley^	2026	Chief of Navy (2026–)	

== See also ==
- Ranks of the Royal Australian Navy
- Australian Defence Force ranks and insignia
