= James Willis (admiral) =

Sir James Willis
- Born: Guido James Willis; 18 October 1923; Learmonth, Victoria
- Died: 15 June 2003 (aged 79); Adelaide, South Australia
- Military career
- Allegiance: Australia
- Branch: Royal Australian Navy
- Service years: 1937–1982
- Rank: Vice Admiral
- Commands: Chief of Naval Staff (1979–1982); HM Australian Fleet (1978–1979); HMAS Melbourne (1971–1972); HMAS Yarra (1966); HMAS Vampire (1962–1963); HMAS Quiberon (1959–1961); HMAS Tobruk (1955); HMAS Latrobe (1946–1947)
- Conflicts: World War II; Korean War
- Awards: Knight Commander of the Order of the British Empire; Officer of the Order of Australia

Vice Admiral Sir Guido James Willis KBE, AO (18 October 1923 – 15 June 2003), was an officer in the Royal Australian Navy (RAN) who rose to the rank of vice admiral. He joined the RAN in 1937, saw active service during World War II and the Korean War, and was Chief of Naval Staff (CNS) from 1979 to 1982 before retiring.

== Early career ==
James Willis was born at Learmonth, Victoria, in 1923 and later brought up in Mount Gambier, South Australia. His father, Dr J. R. L. Willis, had served in the British Royal Navy and the RAN during World War I. Willis attended Wesley College in Melbourne and entered the Royal Australian Naval College in 1937. His younger brother Allan entered the college in 1940.

Willis completed his officer training in 1940 and was posted to the heavy cruiser HMAS Canberra, joining the ship on Boxing Day. He remained with Canberra until December 1941 when he joined the British destroyer HMS Kingston which was engaged in escorting convoys traveling from Egypt to Malta. Willis transferred to the battleship HMS Valiant in early 1942 and later undertook a course in the United Kingdom.

After completing his course Willis returned to Australia in April 1943 where he was posted to HMAS Nepal as a gunnery control officer. He was removed from this position and transferred to navigation duties, however, following an incident in which a large number of practice rounds were fired without being aimed. Willis was promoted to lieutenant in August 1943 and remained with Nepal until early 1945. During this time the ship operated throughout the Indian Ocean. At the start of 1945 he was posted to the British Pacific Fleet as executive officer of HMAS Barcoo and saw action with this ship in the Dutch East Indies until the end of the war.

After a brief period at HMAS Cerberus, the RAN's training depot, Willis was given his first command, the corvette HMAS Latrobe. In 1947 he went to the United Kingdom for specialist navigation and fighter direction training. He topped this course and achieved a record mark of 100 percent for astronomical navigation. Willis returned to Australia in 1949 on board the aircraft carrier HMAS Sydney. He was married to Dr Helen Turner later in the year and joined HMAS Warramunga as flotilla navigation officer. Willis served on board the ship during its six-month-long deployment to Korean waters during the Korean War from late 1950 to early 1951 before being sent to the United Kingdom for further specialist training. At the end of this course he was promoted to lieutenant commander and was a senior instructor with the Royal Navy's navigation training school HMS Dryad for two years. He later attended the Royal Navy's staff college at Greenwich before returning to Australia with HMAS Tobruk.

On his return to Australia Willis joined HMAS Sydney as fleet navigation officer until he transferred to the aircraft carrier HMAS Melbourne when she first arrived in Australia during 1956. He commanded the naval contingent which lined the streets of Melbourne during the 1956 Summer Olympics before moving to a shore posting in December that year.

== Senior commands ==
From 1956 Willis served in a number of shore postings in which he was given increasing levels of responsibility. He later commanded HMAS Quiberon, HMAS Vampire and HMAS Yarra, and was promoted to captain in 1962. He attended the Imperial Defence College in London in 1967 and served as director-general of operations and plans in the Navy Office for three years when he returned to Australia. He later commanded HMAS Melbourne until 1972 when he was appointed the commodore in charge of the light destroyer project.

Willis was promoted to rear admiral in 1973 and continued to serve in important shore postings. He served as Chief of Naval Personnel, Chief of Naval Materiel and Assistant Chief of the Defence Force Staff. In 1976 he was made an Officer of the Order of Australia and married Marjorie Campbell-Smith after his first marriage ended. From 1978 he served as Fleet Commander. His brother Alan also reached the rank of rear admiral, with the brothers being the first to serve together at that rank in Australia.

On 21 April 1979, Willis was promoted to vice admiral and became Chief of the Naval Staff (CNS), the commander of the RAN. In the 1981 Birthday Honours he was appointed a Knight Commander of the Order of the British Empire for his service to the RAN, becoming the last CNS to receive this honour. In 1982, he arranged for the purchase of the British aircraft carrier HMS Invincible, but was later to be disappointed when the sale was canceled after the Falklands War. Willis retired from the Navy on 21 April 1982.

After retirement Willis and his wife divided their time between Canberra and Tuross Head, New South Wales. He became the first chairman of the Anglican Diocese of Canberra and Goulburn and later moved to Adelaide in 1998. He died there on 15 June 2003 after a lengthy period of ill-health.

== Notes ==
Military offices
Preceded by Vice Admiral Sir Anthony Synnot	Chief of the Naval Staff; 1979–1982	Succeeded by Vice Admiral David Leach
Preceded by Rear Admiral Neil McDonald	Flag Officer Commanding HM Australian Fleet; 1978–1979	Succeeded by Rear Admiral David Leach
