= David Leach (admiral) =

Australian admiral (1928–2020)

David Willoughby Leach
- Born: 17 July 1928; Subiaco, Western Australia
- Died: 19 January 2020 (aged 91)
- Spouse: Pamela Leach
- Children: 2
- Military career
- Allegiance: Australia
- Branch: Royal Australian Navy
- Service years: 1942–1985
- Rank: Vice Admiral
- Commands: Chief of Naval Staff (1982–85); HM Australian Fleet (1979–80); HMAS Perth (1968–69); HMAS Vendetta (1964–66)
- Conflicts: Second World War; Vietnam War
- Awards: Companion of the Order of Australia; Commander of the Order of the British Empire; Lieutenant of the Royal Victorian Order; Meritorious Service Medal (Singapore)

Vice Admiral David Willoughby Leach, AC, CBE, LVO (17 July 1928 –19 January 2020) was a senior officer of the Royal Australian Navy, who served as Chief of the Naval Staff from 1982 to 1985.

== Early life ==
Leach was born in Subiaco, Western Australia, on 17 July 1928 to John Digby Leach, a First World War veteran and later Commissioner of Main Roads in Western Australia, and his wife Grace Lilian. Initially educated at Perth Modern School, Leach entered the Royal Australian Naval College in January 1942 aged thirteen.

== Naval career ==
Leach commanded the guided missile destroyers HMAS Vendetta and HMAS Perth during the Vietnam War for which he was appointed a Commander of the Order of the British Empire in 1969. In 1970 he managed naval liaison for the Royal Visit to Australia for which he was appointed a Lieutenant of the Royal Victorian Order.

He was appointed Flag Officer Commanding HM Australian Fleet in 1979 and Chief of the Naval Staff in 1982. He was made a Companion of the Order of Australia in June 1984, and retired in 1985.

After retiring from the Navy, Leach joined the Council of the Australian War Memorial and became a member of the Administrative Appeals Tribunal. He was also elected as an alderman in the Municipality of Woollahra, and served as mayor during 1995. Leach died in Sydney on 19 January 2020.

Military offices
Preceded by Rear Admiral James Willis	Flag Officer Commanding HM Australian Fleet; 1979–1980	Succeeded by Rear Admiral Peter Doyle
Preceded by Rear Admiral Alan Willis	Chief of Naval Personnel; 1980–1982	Succeeded by Rear Admiral David Martin
Preceded by Vice Admiral Sir James Willis	Chief of the Naval Staff; 1982–1985	Succeeded by Admiral Michael Hudson
Civic offices
Preceded by Andrew Briger	Mayor of Woollahra; 1994–1995	Succeeded by Neville Gruzman
