= HMAS Torrens =

Two ships and a shore establishment of the Royal Australian Navy (RAN) have been named HMAS Torrens, after the River Torrens.

- HMAS Torrens (D67), a River-class torpedo-boat destroyer commissioned in 1916, decommissioned in 1920, and sunk as a target in 1930
- HMAS Torrens (naval base), a naval depot at Port Adelaide, South Australia, operated from 1940 to 1964
- HMAS Torrens (DE 53), a River-class destroyer escort commissioned in 1971, decommissioned in 1998, and sunk as a target in 1999

== Battle honours ==
Ships named HMAS Torrens are entitled to carry a single battle honour:

- Adriatic 1917–18
