= Donald Chalmers =

Australian navy officer (born 1942)

Donald Bruce Chalmers
- Born: 29 April 1942 (age 84); Young, New South Wales
- Military career
- Allegiance: Australia
- Branch: Royal Australian Navy
- Service years: 1958–1999
- Rank: Vice Admiral
- Commands: Chief of Navy (1997–99); Maritime Commander Australia (1993–95); Royal Australian Navy Task Group, Gulf War (1990); HMAS Perth (1981–83)
- Conflicts: Indonesia–Malaysia confrontation Gulf War
- Awards: Officer of the Order of Australia; Commander of the Legion of Merit (United States); Knight Grand Cross of the Order of the Crown of Thailand

Vice Admiral Donald Bruce Chalmers, AO (born 29 April 1942) is a retired senior commander of the Royal Australian Navy (RAN), who served as Chief of Navy from 1997 to 1999.

== Early life ==
Chalmers was born on 29 April 1942 in Young, New South Wales, to Donald Lisle Chalmers and Constance (née Eagles).

== Career ==
Chalmers joined the RAN in 1958 and chose to specialise in navigation. He served in HMAS Yarra and HMAS Parramatta during the Indonesia–Malaysia confrontation in the mid-1960s and went on to command HMAS Perth from 1981 to 1983. He was awarded the National Medal in 1977. In 1988, he attended the Royal College of Defence Studies in the United Kingdom. He was appointed as an Officer of the Order of Australia in 1992 in recognition of his services as Commander of the first Royal Australian Navy Task Group during the Gulf War. He was appointed Maritime Commander Australia in December 1993, Assistant Chief of Defence Force responsible for Australian Defence Force development and international defence relationships in April 1995, and finally Chief of Navy in July 1997. He was awarded the Legion of Merit by the United States Government in 1998 and retired in July 1999.

== Notes ==
Military offices
Preceded by Vice Admiral Rodney Taylor	Chief of Navy; 1997–1999	Succeeded by Vice Admiral David Shackleton
Preceded by Rear Admiral Robert Walls	Maritime Commander Australia; 1993–1995	Succeeded by Rear Admiral Chris Oxenbould
