= George Hyde (admiral) =

Royal Australian Navy officer (1877–1937)

Admiral Sir George Hyde KCB CVO CBE
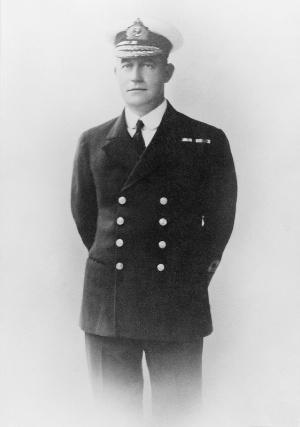
- Rear Admiral George Hyde, 1930
- Born: George Francis Hyde; 19 July 1877; Southsea, Portsmouth
- Died: 28 July 1937 (aged 60); Melbourne, Victoria
- Military career
- Allegiance: United Kingdom; Australia
- Branch: Royal Navy (1896–12); Royal Australian Navy (1912–37)
- Service years: 1896–1937
- Rank: Admiral
- Commands: First Naval Member & Chief of Staff (1931–37); 3rd Battle Squadron (1930–31); HMS Marlborough (1931); HMS Emperor of India (1930); HM Australian Squadron (1926–29); HMAS Brisbane (1919–21); HMS Adventure (1915–17); HMS Shannon (1910); HMS Rother (1908–09)
- Conflicts: First World War
- Awards: Knight Commander of the Order of the Bath; Commander of the Royal Victorian Order; Commander of the Order of the British Empire; Mentioned in Despatches

Admiral Sir George Francis Hyde, KCB, CVO, CBE (19 July 1877 – 28 July 1937) was an English-born Australian admiral, known as a former head and the first officer to achieve the rank of full admiral in the Royal Australian Navy.

== Early life ==
Hyde was born in the seaside resort, Southsea, in the city of Portsmouth. He was the son of a clerk, Ebenezer Hyde, and Maria, née Alexander. Educated at a private school in Portsmouth, Hyde's desire to attain a high rank in the Royal Navy was strengthened by a love to serve his country, and love for the sea.

== Entrance into Britain's Royal Navy ==
In 1894, Hyde entered the merchant service as an apprentice, hoping to gain a commission into the Royal Naval Reserve. Finishing his apprenticeship after four trips aboard a sailing ship, Mount Stewart, he journeyed as second mate in the barque Amulree in 1898. Hyde was commissioned as a midshipman in the Royal Naval Reserve in 1896, and served upon His Majesty's Ships Magnificent, Victorious, Bacchante, Leviathan and Tribune, as reserve. Promoted to sub-lieutenant in 1901, he was posted as an acting lieutenant to the battleship HMS Nile on 23 June 1902, to serve during the Coronation Fleet Review for King Edward VII. He was promoted to the rank of lieutenant the following month, on 19 July 1902, and was posted to HMS Magnificent for 12 months training from late August 1902. He continued his services to the Naval Reserve until he was gazetted as a lieutenant in the Royal Navy in July 1905. This was due to winning an essay competition about the Russo-Japanese War, in which he was, upon the intervention of Admiral Lord Charles Beresford, "elevated to join the list of Supplementary Lieutenants". The admiral had submitted three applications before Hyde was promoted to the Royal Navy.

== Transfer to Australia ==
After commanding several ships such as Torpedo Boat No.6, a destroyer HMS Rother, and a cruiser HMS Shannon, Hyde travelled to Australia, after being placed on loan to the Commonwealth Naval Forces. After returning to England, Hyde was granted a transfer to the Royal Australian Navy in 1912, and was commissioned the rank of commander. In 1913, he sailed in the Indefatigable-class battlecruiser HMAS Australia, to Australia.

== First World War to the 1920s ==
In July 1915, Hyde was appointed by the Admiralty, to command the light cruiser HMS Adventure, into the Coast of Ireland Command. He remained in Adventure after he reached the Command, acting as captain of the fleet to Vice Admiral Sir Lewis Bayly. Between 24 April and 29 April 1916, during the Irish Easter Rebellion, after fears of international communication problems between the British Army's commander-in-chief of Ireland, Adventure was sent as communication aid and general assistance. Vice Admiral Bayly reported back to the Admiralty on 30 April 1916, when commenting about the incident, that Hyde "performed his duties with great tact and ability".

Officially promoted to captain on 1 April 1917 (having acted under the rank of Captain since his assumption of control of HMS Adventure), Hyde joined the Mercantile Movements Division in the Admiralty, becoming a Senior Naval Officer on 6 June 1918. On 10 August of the same year, he married Alice Marjorie Trefusis, before returning to Australia. He was appointed as Director of the war staff at the Naval Office in Melbourne, remaining at the appointment until August 1919. Upon the personal request of John Jellicoe, 1st Earl Jellicoe, he was attached to Jellicoe's staff in 1919, and became the aide-de-camp to the Governor-General, a post he remained until 1924. Hyde was given command of HMAS Brisbane from 1919 until 1921, and became the second naval member of the Australian Naval Board during 1923–24.

In 1926, Hyde was appointed as commodore, taking command of the Australian Squadron. He was awarded a Commander of the Order of the British Empire in 1926, and a Commander of the Royal Victorian Order in 1927. In 1928, Hyde became the first Australian naval officer to become an honorary aide-de-camp to King George V. On 23 February 1928, he became a rear admiral, taking command of two County-class cruisers; HMAS Canberra (D33) and HMAS Australia (D84). On 16 February 1929, after the deterioration of his marriage with his first wife, Alice Trefusis, which ended in divorce in 1928, Hyde married Isla Robertson.

== 1930s and command of the Royal Australian Navy ==
For one year after May 1930, Hyde held the Royal Navy's command of the 3rd Battle Squadron of the British Home Fleet. He was given command of two Iron Duke-class battleships, HMS Emperor of India, and then HMS Marlborough. After returning to Australia, he became the first naval member of the Australian Naval Board on 20 October 1931, and consequently, the first seagoing officer to become a first naval member. He became a vice admiral in 1932, was appointed a Knight Commander of the Order of the Bath in 1934, and was promoted to admiral in 1936.

Taking over as the head of the Royal Australian Navy in 1931, Hyde was particularly concerned with the navy's inadequacy of defence, and lack of funding, following the Great Depression. He attended a naval commander-in-chief conference in Singapore, and traveled to England in 1935, for a technical discussion with the Admiralty. In 1936, while still in England, he acted as adviser to the Australian High Commissioner, Stanley Melbourne Bruce, and was a participant in discussions which led to the formation of the Second London Naval Treaty. As World War II threatened in the mid-1930s, Hyde became responsible, as the first naval member of the Australian Naval Board, for the strengthening of the Royal Australian Navy. He did this by creating close associations and relationships with the Royal Navy.

== Personal health ==
In 1915, Hyde was diagnosed with sub-acute pneumonia. He had an operation for mouth cancer in 1933, before his health started deteriorating in April 1937, after several small falls. On 20 June 1937, Hyde killed a pedestrian whilst driving in his car. Although a coronial inquiry relinquished him of any blame, the incident caused him enormous distress, contributing to his death of pneumonia in Melbourne eight days later. In accordance with Hyde's wishes, he was given a private funeral service and cremated, instead of a ceremonial naval funeral.

== Footnotes ==
Military offices
Preceded by Vice Admiral Sir William Munro Kerr	First Naval Member and Chief of Staff; 1931–1937	Succeeded by Admiral Sir Ragnar Colvin
Preceded by Commodore Thomas Wardle as Rear Admiral Commanding HM Australian Fleet	Rear Admiral Commanding HM Australian Squadron; 1926–1929	Succeeded by Rear Admiral Edward Evans
