= David Stevenson (admiral) =

Sir David Stevenson
- Rear Admiral David Stevenson inspecting HMAS Brisbane before its deployment to Vietnam (1971).
- Born: Hugh David Stevenson; 24 August 1918; Fortitude Valley, Queensland
- Died: 26 October 1998 (aged 80); Canberra, Australian Capital Territory
- Military career
- Allegiance: Australia
- Branch: Royal Australian Navy
- Service years: 1932–1976
- Rank: Vice Admiral
- Commands: Chief of Naval Staff (1973–76); HM Australian Fleet (1970–71, 1972); HMAS Melbourne (1964–65); HMAS Sydney (1963–64); HMNZS Royalist (1960–61); HMAS Tobruk (1959–60)
- Conflicts: Second World War; Vietnam War
- Awards: Companion of the Order of Australia; Knight Commander of the Order of the British Empire; Mentioned in Despatches

Vice Admiral Sir Hugh David Stevenson AC, KBE (24 August 1918 – 26 October 1998) was a senior officer of the Royal Australian Navy, serving as Chief of Naval Staff from 1973 to 1976.

== Early life ==
Stevenson was born in The Valley, a suburb of Brisbane, Queensland to the Reverend William Henry Webster Stevenson and Katherine Stevenson, the third of four children. His father was the Rector of Holy Trinity Church and later became Anglican Bishop of Grafton, New South Wales. His paternal grandfather was master of a sailing vessel plying to Pacific Ocean ports; his maternal grandfather was William Saumarez Smith, the first Anglican Archbishop of Sydney.

Stevenson was educated at The Southport School and was active in most sports, athletics, football, cricket and represented his school in rowing.

== Naval career ==
He chose a naval career for himself, and joined the Royal Australian Naval College on 13 September 1932, aged 14, to complete his schooling. He was the smallest and shortest of his entry, measuring 4 feet 10.5 inches (148.6 cm). He graduated dux in 1935 and received sporting colours in swimming, tennis, cricket and Rugby.

After initial training in HMAS Canberra, he was posted to HMS Queen Elizabeth, flagship of the Royal Navy's Mediterranean Fleet, which was observing the Spanish Civil War.

=== Second World War ===
After courses in Britain from May 1938 to January 1939, he returned to Australia and was promoted to lieutenant in 1940 while in HMAS Hobart. The ship saw war service in the Red Sea. He joined HMAS Napier in late 1941 in time for the Tobruk Ferry Service and the convoys to Malta, staying on for its service with the Eastern Fleet in the Indian Ocean, and its support the Allied invasion of Madagascar during which he landed with the British Commandos.

In March 1943 he joined HMAS Nepal as First Lieutenant, still with the rank of lieutenant, which he held until after the end of the war. With Nepal he served again in the Indian Ocean. In early 1944 he returned to Australia en route to the United Kingdom for his Long Navigation Course.

He returned to HMAS Napier as Flotilla Navigating Officer, and remained in her until the end of the war, including a period of temporary command when Captain H.J. Buchanan, in charge of the first British landing force in Japan, went ashore at Yokosuka and Lieutenant Stevenson took the ship into Tokyo Bay. Stevenson was Mentioned in Despatches in 1946 for his war service.

=== Post-war ===
Stevenson joined HMAS Swan for two years, as Flotilla Navigating Officer of the 20th Minesweeping Flotilla. After his Advanced Navigation Course in England, he was promoted to lieutenant commander in 1948.

He next served in HMAS Australia, as Fleet Navigation Officer but also First Lieutenant. While serving in Australia a collision occurred in Sydney Harbour; a court case went to the Supreme Court of New South Wales sitting in Admiralty and the appeal in the High Court of Australia, which the Navy won.

In 1952, promoted to commander, Stevenson served again under Captain Buchanan as Navigating Officer of the aircraft carrier HMAS Sydney. He then served ashore as Director of Administrative Plans and Director of Plans.

He joined HMAS Vengeance in 1954, the aircraft carrier then the Fleet Training Ship, which was sent to Japan to ferry No. 77 Squadron, Royal Australian Air Force, back to Australia after service in the Korean War. Stevemson then sailed in Vengeance to the UK where she was decommissioned at Devonport Dockyard late in 1955; he then commissioned HMAS Melbourne at this yard.

Ashore in the UK, Stevenson completed the Royal Navy Staff Course at the Royal Naval College, Greenwich, then served two years in the Tactics and Staff Division of the British Admiralty on the staff of Lord Louis Mountbatten, First Sea Lord.

In 1958, promoted to captain, Stevenson commanded HMAS Tobruk and was Captain (D) (commanding all RAN destroyers) in 1959–60. He then commanded HMNZS Royalist, New Zealand's only cruiser.

The family moved to Canberra in 1962 when he joined Navy Office as Director of Plans.

He returned to sea in 1964 to command HMAS Sydney, and later that year assumed command of HMAS Melbourne after the Melbourne-Voyager collision.

=== Senior appointments ===
In 1966 Stevenson studied at the Imperial Defence College in London, returning in 1967 and promotion to commodore, appointed as Naval Officer in Charge (NOIC) Western Australia and Captain of HMAS Leeuwin, the Junior Recruit Training Establishment.

1968 brought promotion to rear admiral and appointment as Deputy Chief of Naval Staff. In 1970 he became Flag Officer Commanding HM Australian Fleet (FOCAF). On completion, he returned to Navy Office as Chief of Naval Personnel and 2nd Naval Member, and was honoured in the New Year Honours of 1970 with the Commander of the Order of the British Empire.

Stevenson was appointed Chief of Naval Staff, serving from 23 November 1973 to 22 November 1976 with the rank of vice admiral. He replaced Vice Admiral Sir Richard Peek, and was succeeded by Vice Admiral Sir Anthony Synnot. He served under Admiral Sir Victor Smith, Chairman of the Chiefs of Staff Committee.

Further honours flowed from this appointment: Companion of the Order of Australia (AC) in 1976, and Knight Commander of the Order of the British Empire (KBE) in 1976.

== After the navy ==
In retirement, Sir David Stevenson became chairman for the ACT for the Queen Elizabeth Fund for Young Australians. He also served for many years and also served on the board of the YMCA in Canberra.

In 1980, he was invited to be a consultant for the Australian Bicentenary Authority, and attended the Sail Training Association's Tall Ships Regatta in Amsterdam for the purpose of inviting the STA to have their fleet attend Australia's Bi-Centenary in 1988.

After a number of strokes in the 10 years before his death, he became progressively more physically handicapped while remaining mentally alert. He died on 26 October 1998.

His funeral was held with Full Naval Honours on 6 November 1998, at the ANZAC Memorial Chapel of St Paul, Royal Military College Duntroon, with his body conveyed on a gun carriage drawn by 34 naval personnel. A Memorial Service was held in his honour at St Peter's Anglican Church, Southport, Queensland.

== Family ==
Stevenson's older brother, James, died as a test pilot during the Second World War. His older sister Dorothy, was a prima-ballerina with the Royal Ballet and the Borovansky Ballet Company. His younger brother was Kenneth.

On 18 April 1944, Stevenson married Myra Clarke (died 1978) of Melbourne, at St. Peter's Church, Eastern Hill in Melbourne. He sailed soon after for the Long Navigation Course in England. Their daughter, Jacqueline, was born in 1948 and their son, David, was born in 1952.

He married Margaret Wheeler Wright in 1979. In 1985, he and his wife retired to the Gold Coast, Queensland, near where he had attended school, where he continued his interests in golf, fishing, sailing, lawn bowls, travelling, reading and playing bridge. He was Patron of Queensland's N Class Destroyers Association for some years.

Military offices
Preceded by Vice Admiral Sir Richard Peek	Chief of Naval Staff; 1973–1976	Succeeded by Vice Admiral Sir Anthony Synnot
Preceded by Rear Admiral William Dovers	Flag Officer Commanding HM Australian Fleet; January – April 1972	Succeeded by Rear Admiral William Dovers
Preceded by Rear Admiral Gordon Crabb	Flag Officer Commanding HM Australian Fleet; 1970–1971	Succeeded by Rear Admiral William Dovers
Preceded by Rear Admiral Victor Smith	Deputy Chief of Naval Staff; 1968–1970	Succeeded by Rear Admiral David Wells
