= Admiral (Australia) =

Rank of the Royal Australian Navy

- Admiral's command flag

- The ADML insignia
- Country: Australia
- Service branch: Royal Australian Navy
- Abbreviation: ADML
- Rank group: Flag officer
- Rank: Four-star
- Non-NATO rank: OF-9
- Pay grade: O-10
- Formation: 12 July 1936
- Next higher rank: Admiral of the fleet
- Next lower rank: Vice admiral
- Equivalent ranks: General (Army); Air chief marshal (RAAF)

Admiral (abbreviated as ADML) is the highest active rank of the Royal Australian Navy and was created as a direct equivalent of the British naval rank of admiral. It is a four-star rank. Since 1968, generally the only time the rank is held is when the Chief of the Defence Force is a navy officer.

Admiral is a higher rank than vice admiral, but is a lower rank than admiral of the fleet. (Note: Note that, other than royalty, there have been no Australian admirals of the fleet.) Admiral is the equivalent of air chief marshal in the Royal Australian Air Force and general in the Australian Army.

== Australian admirals ==
The following have held the rank of admiral in the Royal Australian Navy:

Name	Date promoted	Senior command(s) or appointment(s) in rank	Notes
Sir George Hyde	12 July 1936	First Naval Member and Chief of Staff (1931–37)	
Sir Victor Smith	23 November 1970	Chairman, Chiefs of Staff Committee (1970–75)	
Sir Anthony Synnot	21 April 1979	Chief of the Defence Force Staff (1979–82)	
Michael Hudson	8 March 1991	Chief of Naval Staff (1985–91)	Promoted to admiral on the day of his retirement
Alan Beaumont	17 April 1993	Chief of the Defence Force (1993–95)	
Chris Barrie	4 July 1998	Chief of the Defence Force (1998–02)	
David Johnston	10 July 2024	Chief of the Defence Force (2024–26)	
Mark Hammond	9 July 2026	Chief of the Defence Force (2026–present)	

== Rank insignia and personal flag ==
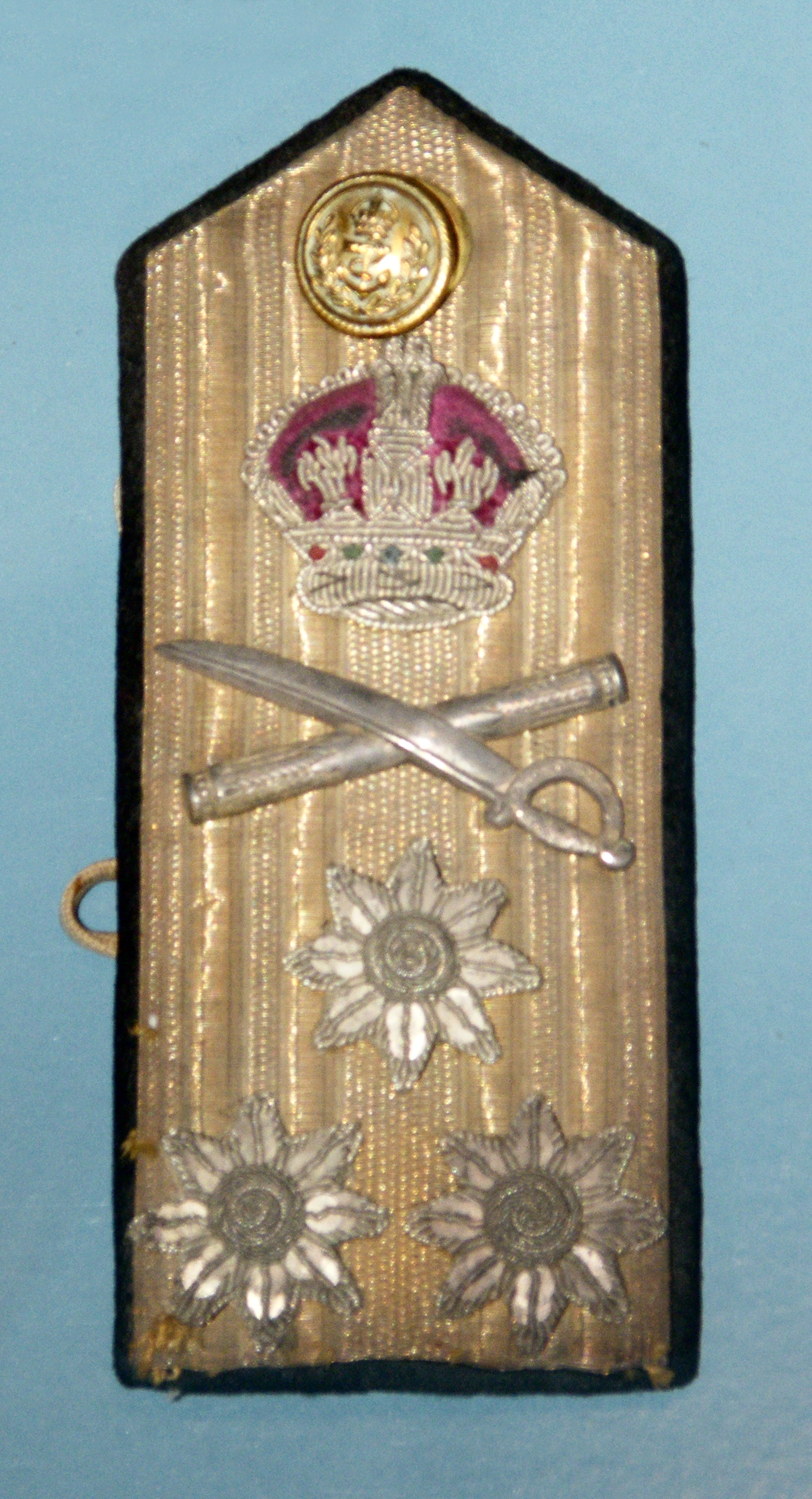
Shoulder board prior to 1995.

The current ranks are rear admiral, vice admiral, admiral and admiral of the fleet, also known as flag ranks because admirals, known as flag officers, are entitled to fly a personal flag. An admiral of the fleet flies a national flag at the masthead, while an admiral flies a Saint George's Cross (red cross on white). Vice admirals and rear admirals fly a Saint George's Cross with one or two red discs in the hoist, respectively. These command flags are exactly the same as in the Royal Navy, except for the admiral of the fleet, who flies the Union Flag.

The rank of admiral itself is shown in its sleeve lace by a broad band with three narrower bands. Since the mid-1990s, the insignia of a Royal Australian Navy admiral is the Crown of St. Edward above a crossed sword and baton, above four silver stars, above the word AUSTRALIA. Note that unlike other Commonwealth countries, the sword is a naval cutlass, with a closed handle. The stars have eight points, like the Royal Navy insignia and unlike the four-pointed Order of the Bath stars used by the army.

Prior to 1995, the RAN shoulder board was identical to the UK shoulder board. The UK shoulder board changed in 2001.

== See also ==
- Ranks of the Royal Australian Navy
- Australian Defence Force ranks and insignia
