= Vietnam Medal =

- Obverse (left), reverse (right)
- Type: Campaign medal
- Awarded for: Campaign service.
- Description: Silver disk, 36mm diameter.
- Presented by: the monarch of Australia (Australian personnel) the monarch of New Zealand (New Zealand personnel)
- Eligibility: Australian and New Zealand forces.
- Campaign: Vietnam (1964–73)
- Clasps: None
- Established: 8 June 1968

Highlights
- Total: 18,740 Australian, 3,312 New Zealand.
- Medal ribbon Medal ribbon with palm for Mentioned in Dispatches

Order of Wear
- Next (higher): General Service Medal 1962
- Next (lower): Vietnam Logistic and Support Medal
- Related: Vietnam Service Medal; Vietnam Campaign Medal

The Vietnam Medal was a joint Australian and New Zealand campaign medal awarded for service in the Vietnam War.

The medal was jointly developed by Australia and New Zealand, although there were separate Royal authorisation warrants for each country and it was issued through the Imperial system.

== Qualification requirements ==
=== Australia ===
Qualifying service for the Vietnam Medal includes:

- 28 days in ships or craft on inland waters or off the coast of Vietnam.
- One or more days on the posted strength of a unit or formation on land.
- One operational sortie over Vietnam or Vietnamese water by aircrew on the posted strength of a unit.
- Official visits either continuous or aggregate of 30 days.
- One day or more by members of accredited philanthropic organisations attached to Australian forces in an official capacity for full-time duty.

between 29 May 1964 and 27 January 1973.

=== New Zealand ===
The medal was awarded to all members of the New Zealand armed forces who, between 29 May 1964 and 27 January 1973, either:

- served for 28 days, continuous or aggregated, in ships or craft employed in operations on inland waters or off the coast of Vietnam;
- served for one day or more on the posted strength of a unit or formation on land in Vietnam;
- conducted one operational sortie over Vietnam or Vietnamese waters by aircrew on the posted strength of a unit allocated for direct support of operations in Vietnam;
- served for 30 days or more, continuous or aggregated, on official visits, inspections or other occurrences of a temporary nature on duty in Vietnam, or in ships or craft engaged in operations off the Vietnamese coast.

Service terminated by death or wounds, or the award of a decoration for gallantry, led to the immediate award of the medal, regardless of whether the qualification period had been fulfilled.

== Description ==
- The Vietnam Medal is a circular medal made of nickel-silver. The obverse bears the crowned effigy of Queen Elizabeth II with the inscription 'ELIZABETH II DEI GRATIA REGINA F.D.'.
- The reverse of the medal has the word 'VIETNAM' at the top centre above a depiction of a man standing between two symbolic spheres, "in representation of the ideological war in Vietnam".
- The medal ribbon contains a broad central stripe of bright yellow surmounted by three thin red stripes (representing the Republic of Vietnam). The ribbon also has a blue stripe to represent the Navy, two red stripes for the Army and a light blue stripe for the Air Force.
- The recipient's name, rank and serial number are engraved on the edge of the medal.

== Bibliography ==
- Mackay, J and Mussel, J (eds) - Medals Yearbook - 2005, (2004), Token Publishing.
- Joslin, Litherland, and Simpkin (eds), British Battles and Medals, (1988), Spink
