= Chief of Navy (Australia) =

Head of the Royal Australian Navy

Chief of the Royal Australian Navy
- Crest of the Chief of Navy

- Flag of the Chief of Navy
- Incumbent; Vice Admiral Matt Buckley since 7 July 2026
- Royal Australian Navy
- Style: Vice Admiral
- Member of: Australian Defence Force
- Reports to: Chief of the Defence Force
- Term length: Three years (renewable)
- Formation: 25 February 1904
- First holder: Rear Admiral; Sir William Creswell
- Deputy: Deputy Chief of Navy
- Website: Official website

The chief of Navy is the most senior appointment in the Royal Australian Navy, responsible to the chief of the Defence Force (CDF) and the secretary of defence. The rank associated with the position is vice admiral (3-star).

Vice Admiral Matt Buckley is the current chief of Navy; he assumed the position on 7 July 2026.

== Appointees ==
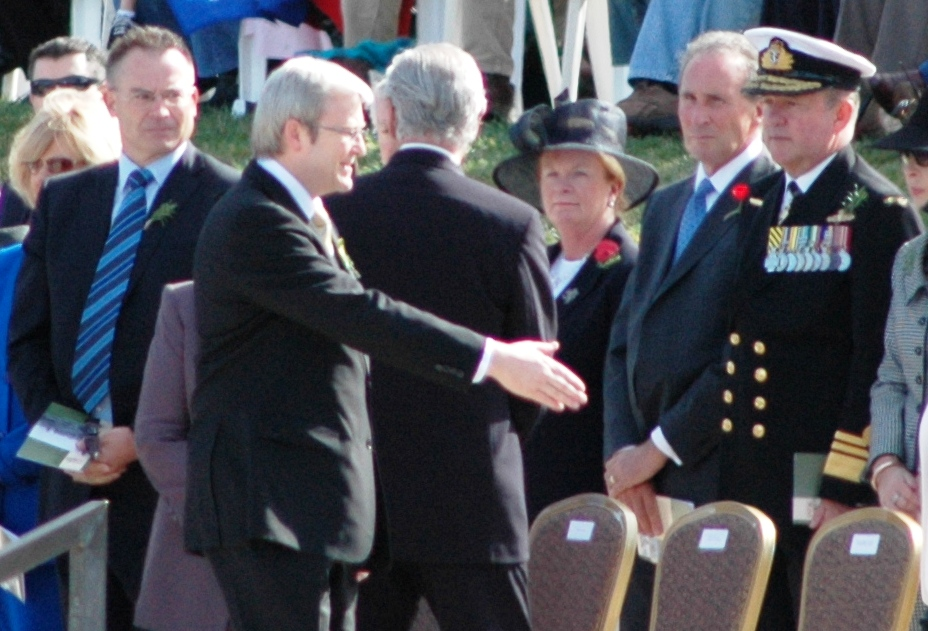
Vice Admiral Russ Shalders, the then chief of Navy, being greeted by then Prime Minister of Australia Kevin Rudd at the 2008 National Anzac Day Service, Australian War Memorial, Canberra

The following list chronologically records those who have held the post of chief of Navy or its preceding positions. Rank and honours are as at the completion of the individual's tours.

Rank and prefix	Name	Postnominal(s)	Service	Term began	Term ended	Time in appointment
Director, Commonwealth Naval Forces
Rear Admiral Sir	William Rooke Creswell	KCMG, KBE	CNF	25 February 1904	28 February 1911	7 years, 3 days
First Naval Member, Australian Commonwealth Naval Board
Rear Admiral Sir	William Rooke Creswell	KCMG, KBE	RAN	1 March 1911	9 June 1919	8 years, 100 days
Rear Admiral Sir	Percy Grant	KCVO, CB	RN	10 June 1919	14 February 1921	1 year, 249 days
Vice Admiral Sir	Allan Everett	KCMG, KCVO, CB	RN	24 November 1921	29 August 1923	1 year, 278 days
Rear Admiral	Percival Hall-Thompson	CB, CMG	RN	25 February 1924	28 June 1926	2 years, 123 days
Rear Admiral	William Napier	CB, CMG, DSO	RN	29 June 1926	11 June 1929	2 years, 347 days
Vice Admiral Sir	William Munro Kerr	KBE, CB	RN	21 October 1929	19 October 1931	1 year, 363 days
Admiral Sir	George Hyde	KCB, CVO, CBE	RN/RAN	20 October 1931	28 July 1937	5 years, 281 days
Admiral Sir	Ragnar Colvin	KBE, CB	RN	1 November 1937	3 March 1941	3 years, 122 days
Admiral Sir	Guy Royle	KCB, CMG, DSO	RN	18 July 1941	28 June 1945	3 years, 345 days
Admiral Sir	Louis Keppel Hamilton	KCB, DSO	RN	29 June 1945	23 February 1948	2 years, 239 days
Vice Admiral Sir	John Augustine Collins	KBE, CB	RAN	24 February 1948	23 February 1955	6 years, 364 days
Vice Admiral Sir	Roy Dowling	KBE, CB, DSO	RAN	24 February 1955	23 February 1959	4 years, 0 days
Vice Admiral Sir	Henry Burrell	KBE, CB	RAN	24 February 1959	23 February 1962	2 years, 364 days
Vice Admiral Sir	Hastings Harrington	KBE, CB, DSO	RAN	24 February 1962	23 February 1965	2 years, 365 days
Vice Admiral Sir	Alan McNicoll	KBE, CB, GM	RAN	24 February 1965	2 April 1968	3 years, 38 days
Vice Admiral Sir	Victor Smith	KBE, CB, DSC	RAN	3 April 1968	22 November 1970	2 years, 233 days
Vice Admiral Sir	Richard Peek	KBE, CB, DSC	RAN	23 November 1970	22 November 1973	2 years, 364 days
Vice Admiral Sir	David Stevenson	AC, KBE	RAN	23 November 1973	22 November 1976	2 years, 365 days
Chief of the Naval Staff
Vice Admiral Sir	Anthony Synnot	KBE, AO	RAN	23 November 1976	20 April 1979	2 years, 148 days
Vice Admiral Sir	James Willis	KBE, AO	RAN	21 April 1979	20 April 1982	2 years, 364 days
Vice Admiral	David Leach	AC, CBE, LVO	RAN	21 April 1982	20 April 1985	2 years, 364 days
Admiral	Michael Hudson	AC	RAN	21 April 1985	8 March 1991	5 years, 321 days
Vice Admiral	Ian MacDougall	AC	RAN	9 March 1991	9 March 1994	3 years, 0 days
Vice Admiral	Rodney Taylor	AO	RAN	10 March 1994	18 February 1997	2 years, 345 days
Chief of Navy
Vice Admiral	Rodney Taylor	AO	RAN	19 February 1997	30 June 1997	131 days
Vice Admiral	Donald Chalmers	AO	RAN	1 July 1997	2 July 1999	2 years, 1 day
Vice Admiral	David Shackleton	AO	RAN	3 July 1999	2 July 2002	2 years, 364 days
Vice Admiral	Chris Ritchie	AO	RAN	3 July 2002	3 July 2005	3 years, 0 days
Vice Admiral	Russ Shalders	AO, CSC	RAN	4 July 2005	3 July 2008	2 years, 365 days
Vice Admiral	Russ Crane	AO, CSM	RAN	4 July 2008	7 June 2011	2 years, 338 days
Vice Admiral	Ray Griggs	AO, CSC	RAN	7 June 2011	30 June 2014	3 years, 23 days
Vice Admiral	Tim Barrett	AO, CSC	RAN	30 June 2014	6 July 2018	4 years, 6 days
Vice Admiral	Michael Noonan	AO	RAN	6 July 2018	6 July 2022	4 years, 0 days
Vice Admiral	Mark Hammond	AO	RAN	6 July 2022	7 July 2026	4 years, 1 day
Vice Admiral	Matt Buckley	AM CSC	RAN	7 July 2026	Incumbent	62 days
