= HMAS Torrens (DE 53) =

1968 River-class destroyer escort

Coordinates: 31°47′00″S 114°47′00″E

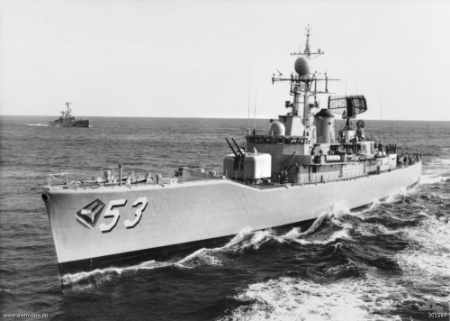
- HMA Ships Torrens and Yarra (background) underway

History

Australia
- Namesake: The River Torrens
- Builder: Cockatoo Docks and Engineering Company Propriety Limited
- Laid down: 18 August 1965
- Launched: 28 September 1968
- Commissioned: 18 January 1971
- Decommissioned: 1998
- Motto: "Faith and Fortitude"
- Honours and awards: One inherited battle honour
- Fate: Sunk as target, 14 June 1999

General characteristics
- Class & type: River-class destroyer escort
- Displacement: 2,700 long tons (2,700 t)
- Length: 107 m (351 ft 1 in)
- Beam: 12.49 m (41 ft 0 in)
- Draught: 4.57 m (15 ft 0 in)
- Propulsion: 2 × English Electric steam turbines; 2 shaft; 30,000 shp (22,400 kW); 2 × JTA 500 kW generators from the steam turbines; 2 × KTA 500 kW generators powered from diesels.
- Speed: 30 knots (56 km/h; 35 mph)
- Range: 4,500 nmi (8,300 km; 5,200 mi) at 12 knots (22 km/h; 14 mph)
- Complement: 250
- Sensors & processing systems: 1991 Mulloka sonar system Radar, 8GR-301 surface-search/navigation radar – 1991 Refitted with Krupp Atlas ARPA 8600, LW-02 Long Range Air Search Radar, M22 Gun Fire Control System, M44, ELT-901 EW System
- Armament: 2 × 4.5-inch (110 mm) Mark 6 guns; 1 × Limbo anti-submarine mortar; 1 × quad Seacat SAM launcher; 1 × Ikara ASW system; 2 × Mark 32 torpedo tubes – 1989

HMAS Torrens (DE 53) was a River-class destroyer escort of the Royal Australian Navy (RAN). Torrens entered service in 1971, and was active until her decommissioning in 1998.

The ship was sunk as a target by HMAS Farncomb in June 1999. Images and footage of the ship sinking have been used and adapted for various purposes, including in movies and as propaganda.

== Construction ==
Torrens and sister ship HMAS Swan were ordered in 1964 as replacements for HMAS Voyager, a destroyer lost following a collision with the aircraft carrier HMAS Melbourne in 1964. Although intended to be the same as the previous River class ships (themselves based on the British Type 12 frigate), the design was changed from 1965 to incorporate many of the improvements of the British Leander-class frigates. Work on the two vessels started without specifications or a contract, and the evolving design meant changes were being made as the ships were being constructed, with resulting delays and cost increases attributed to a lack of planning.

Torrens was laid down by the Cockatoo Docks and Engineering Company Propriety Limited at Sydney, New South Wales on 18 August 1965. She was launched on 28 September 1968 by Dame Zara Holt, and commissioned into the RAN on 18 January 1971. Torrens was the last major war vessel built in an Australian shipyard until work commenced on HMAS Melbourne in 1985.

== Operational history ==
Based/ home ported primarily in Sydney for most of her commissioning, then moving over to the West, HMAS STIRLING, Garden Island WA in the later part of her career, late 198 early to mid 1990s.

Regularly conducting naval exercises along the eastern coast in the EAXA ( Eastern Australia Exercise Area) and Jervis Bay, ACT. Her many trips and regional deployments up to and around South East Asia, conducting 'war games' / exercises in many countries, including Singapore, Malaysia, Thailand, Hong Kong and the Philippines. Visiting ports and the numerous trips to wave the Flag.

Torrens and the destroyer tender HMAS Stalwart participated in celebrations of Papua New Guinea's independence from Australia in September 1975, with Torrens arriving in Rabaul on 14 September.

On 16 August 1976, Torrens and HMAS Melbourne were performing work-up exercises following the latter's refit when they were called to assist MV Miss Chief off the coast of Bundaberg, Queensland.

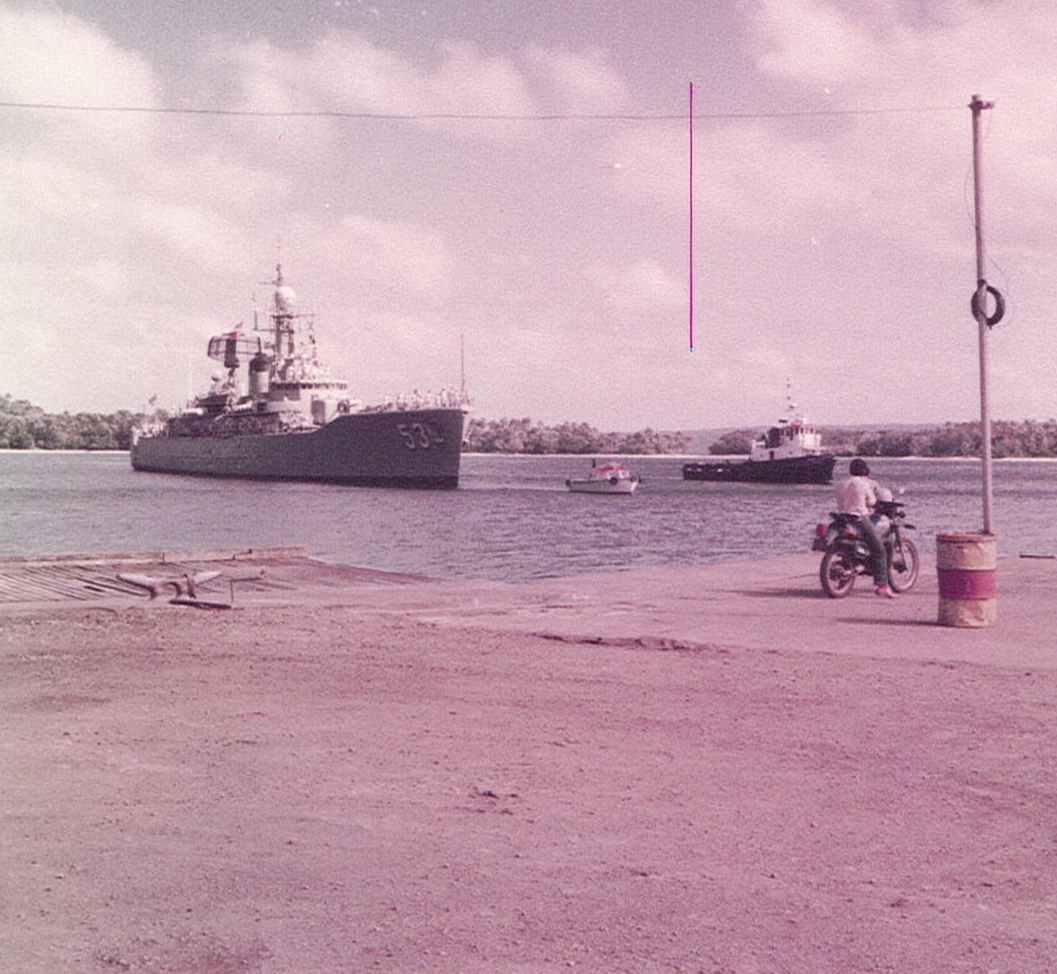
Torrens approaching Port Vila wharf 1983

During late February and early March 1972, Torrens escorted the troopship HMAS Sydney on her twenty-fourth and final troop transport voyage in support of the Vietnam War. The ships arrived in Vũng Tàu on 28 February, collected 457 Australian soldiers, then departed the next day for home.

== Decommissioning and fate ==
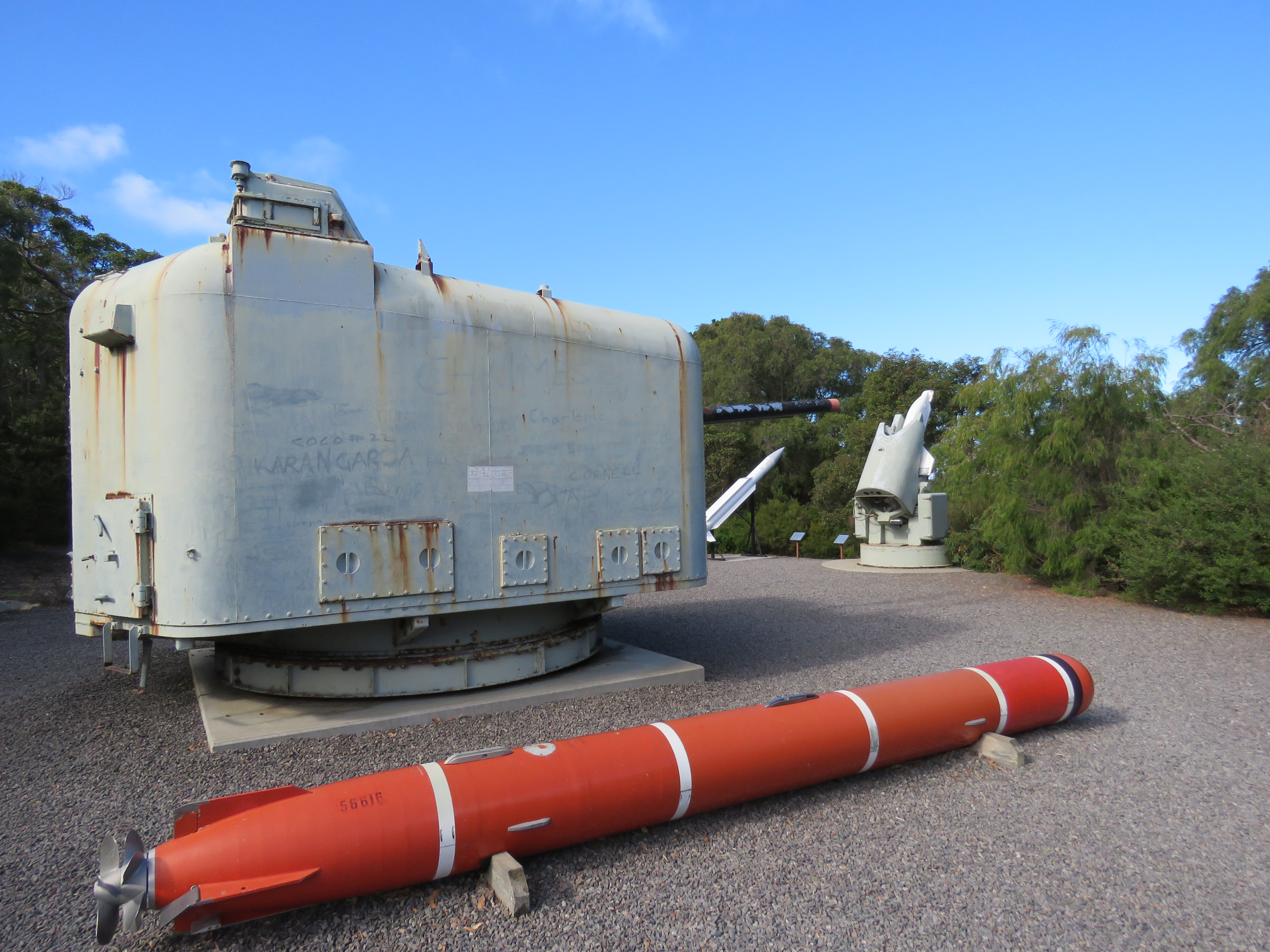
A QF 4.5-inch gun turret of HMAS Torrens on display at the Princess Royal Fortress, Albany, Western Australia

HMAS Torrens paid off in 1998. On 14 June 1999, Torrens was sunk by a live Mark 48 Mod 4 torpedo fired by the Collins-class submarine HMAS Farncomb during the latter's combat system trials, with the torpedo hitting Torrens amidships which broke her keel.

Digitally edited film of the torpedo hitting Torrens was used in the 2001 film Pearl Harbor as part of a black-and-white 'newsreel' montage. A photo of Torrens exploding was used on a Hezbollah-operated website to support a propaganda claim that an Israeli warship was sunk by a Hezbollah missile in July 2006.

Her 4.5-inch Mk V/Mk 6 gun turret is preserved at Princess Royal Fortress, Albany, Western Australia.
