= Rear admiral (Australia) =

Rank of the Royal Australian Navy

- Rear Admiral insignia

- Rear Admiral's command flag
- Country: Australia
- Service branch: Royal Australian Navy
- Abbreviation: RADM
- Rank: Two-star
- NATO rank code: OF-7
- Non-NATO rank: O-8
- Next higher rank: Vice admiral
- Next lower rank: Commodore
- Equivalent ranks: Major general (Army); Air vice-marshal (RAAF)

Rear admiral (abbreviated as RADM) is the third-highest active rank of the Royal Australian Navy and was created as a direct equivalent of the British rank of rear admiral. It is a two-star rank.

Rear admiral is a higher rank than commodore, but lower than vice admiral. Rear admiral is the equivalent of air vice-marshal in the Royal Australian Air Force and major general in the Australian Army.

Since the mid-1990s, the insignia of a Royal Australian Navy vice admiral is the Crown of St. Edward above a crossed sabre (Note: Usually in Commonwealth countries a scimitar is used in the insignia, which is an open-handled weapon; the sabre has a closed handle.) and baton, above two silver stars, above the word "AUSTRALIA". The stars have eight points (Note: The stars have eight points, unlike the four pointed Order of the Bath stars used by the army, which are often referred to as "pips".) as in the equivalent Royal Navy insignia. Prior to 1995, the RAN shoulder board was identical to the UK shoulder board. The UK shoulder board changed in 2001.

Rear Admiral Robyn Walker AM, RAN became the first female admiral in the Royal Australian Navy when she was appointed Surgeon-General of the Australian Defence Force on 16 December 2011.

== See also ==
- Ranks of the Royal Australian Navy
- Australian Defence Force ranks and insignia
- List of Royal Australian Navy admirals
