= Australian Submarine Agency =

Submarine nuclear regulator

- Agency logo

- Program logo

Agency overview
- Formed: 1 July 2023; 3 years ago
- Jurisdiction: Commonwealth of Australia
- Headquarters: Canberra, Australian Capital Territory, Australia
- Employees: 883 (2025–26)
- Annual budget: $388.8 million (2025–26)
- Minister responsible: Richard Marles, Minister for Defence
- Agency executive: Vice Admiral Jonathan Mead, Director-General (As of July 2023)
- Parent agency: Department of Defence
- Website: www.asa.gov.au

The Australian Submarine Agency (ASA), formerly the Nuclear-Powered Submarine Task Force (NPSTF) is the federal statutory agency of the Commonwealth Government responsible for guiding Australia’s nuclear-powered submarine program. The ASA was established in July 2023 as a non-corporate Commonwealth entity under the Department of Defence consisting of defence personnel and Australian public servants.

== Organisation ==
Personnel will be based across Australia as well as in the United Kingdom and the United States, numbering 350 increasing to 680 within the following year. The ASA's expected budget in the 2024-25 Budget was A$243.4 million in 2023-24, increasing to A$527.4 million in 2026-27.

== Leadership ==
=== Director-General ===
Name	Post- nominals	Term began	Term ended
Vice Admiral Jonathan Mead	AO	1 July 2023	Incumbent

=== Nuclear Submarine Capability ===
Name	Post- nominals	Term began	Term ended	Notes
Rear Admiral Matt Buckley	AM CSC	September 2021	December 2024	
Rear Admiral Tom Phillips		December 2024	Incumbent	

== Submarine acquisition ==
The role of the ASA is to support Australia's acquisition of nuclear-powered submarines. The acquisition, through the AUKUS partnership, will include three Virginia-class and five SSN-AUKUS submarines. USS Delaware (SSN-791) and USS New Jersey (SSN-796) are likely to be the two existing United States Navy fleet units that will transferred to the Royal Australian Navy, with the third vessel being a new build.

== Submarine construction ==
The ASA will be the lead agency for nuclear vessel construction, with the Osborne Naval Shipyard designated as the preferred location for the construction of nuclear submarines in Australia. Five Australian SSN-AUKUS submarines will be built in South Australia as part of the arrangement with an undetermined amount of the same design to be built by BAE Systems Submarines for the Royal Navy.

== Nuclear vessel support ==
As part of the transition from diesel-electric to nuclear-powered submarines, the Royal Australian Navy will be using one Royal Navy and four United States Navy submarines stationed at HMAS Stirling on a rotational basis under the name Submarine Rotational Force – West (SRF-West).

== See also ==
- Nuclear power in Australia
