= Matt Buckley =

Australian naval officer

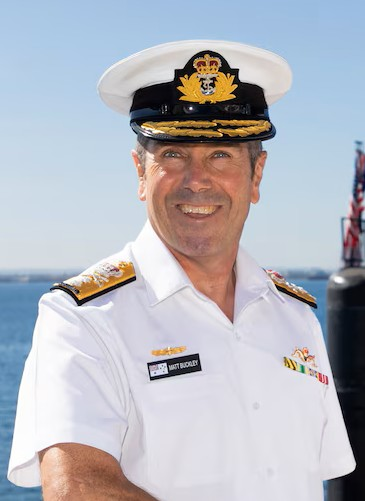
- Matt Buckley in 2023
- Born: February 1972 (age 54); Sydney, New South Wales
- Military career
- Allegiance: Australia
- Branch: Royal Australian Navy
- Service years: 1990–present
- Rank: Vice Admiral
- Commands: Chief of Navy; Deputy Chief of Navy; Nuclear Submarine Capability; Submarine Force; HMAS Collins
- Awards: Member of the Order of Australia; Conspicuous Service Cross

Vice Admiral Matthew Paul Buckley, AM, CSC (born February 1972) is a senior officer in the Royal Australian Navy (RAN). He joined the RAN through the Australian Defence Force Academy in January 1990 and later qualified as a submariner in 1996. He has commanded HMAS Collins and the Submarine Force, was head of nuclear submarine capability from 2023 to 2025, and served as the deputy chief of Navy from January 2025 until June 2026. He was appointed chief of Navy in July 2026.

== Naval career ==
Buckley joined the Royal Australian Navy in 1990 as a maritime warfare officer, graduating from the Australian Defence Force Academy in 1992. In 1996 he specialised as a submariner at HMAS Stirling, serving on Oberon-class submarines based out of Fleet Base East. In the late 1990s he served as an exchange officer with the Royal Canadian Navy based at the Canadian Forces Base Halifax. In 2001 Buckley was awarded the Admiral Nelson Sword of Excellence. Following completion of the Submarine Command Course in 2006, he commanded the submarine HMAS Collins. In 2008 he was appointed the Commander Sea Training Submarines for 18 months before his appointment as the executive officer of HMAS Watson from July 2010 to September 2012.

Buckley was promoted to the rank of captain and appointed as the Director Submarine Capability from October 2012 to September 2014, when he then was appointed the commander Submarine Force. In 2015, Buckley was awarded the Conspicuous Service Cross for outstanding achievement as Director Submarine Capability, Navy Strategic Command from October 2012 to August 2014. Between November 2016 and 2017 he attended the Australian Defence College, completing the Defence and Strategic Studies Course, where he was awarded the Secretary – Chief of Defence Force Award. In December 2017 he was promoted to the rank of commodore and appointed the Director General Maritime Operations, and from December 2020 to August 2021 served as the Director General Navy People. In September 2021 he was promoted to the rank of rear admiral and appointed as the Head of Nuclear-Powered Submarine Capability, with the role title changing to Head of Nuclear Submarine Capability from 1 July 2023 with the establishment of the Australian Submarine Agency. In 2024, Buckley was appointed a Member of the Order of Australia for exceptional service in senior leadership roles within the Royal Australian Navy. On 24 January 2025 he was appointed the Deputy Chief of Navy.

Buckley was promoted to vice admiral and appointed Chief of Navy in July 2026.

== Personal life ==
Buckley is married to Ingrid, and the couple have three sons. He has interests in trail running, mountain biking and surfing. He holds a Bachelor of Arts and a Masters of Strategy and Policy from the University of New South Wales, and a Masters of International Relations from Deakin University.

Military offices
Preceded by Vice Admiral Mark Hammond	Chief of Navy; 2026–present	Incumbent
Preceded by Commodore Eric Young (Acting)	Deputy Chief of Navy; 2025–2026	Succeeded by Rear Admiral Darren Grogan
New title	Head of Nuclear Submarine Capability; 2021–2024	Succeeded by Rear Admiral Tom Phillips
