= Royal Australian Navy =

Naval warfare branch of the Australian Defence Force

- Founded: 1 March 1901; 125 years ago
- Country: Australia
- Branch: Navy
- Role: Naval warfare
- Size: 16,000 permanent personnel; 4,607 reserve personnel; 30 commissioned ships; 14 non-commissioned ships
- Part of: Australian Defence Force
- Headquarters: Russell Offices, Canberra
- Mottos: To fight and win at sea
- March: "Royal Australian Navy"
- Anniversaries: 10 July
- Fleet: 2 landing helicopter docks; 1 landing ship dock; 6 submarines; 3 destroyers; 7 frigates; 2 offshore patrol vessel; 10 patrol boats; 2 minehunters; 1 survey ship; 2 replenishment oilers
- Engagements: First World War; Second World War; Korean War; Malayan Emergency; Indonesian Confrontation; Vietnam War; Gulf War; War in Afghanistan; Iraq War
- Website: www.navy.gov.au

Commanders
- Chief of the Defence Force: Admiral Mark Hammond
- Vice Chief of the Defence Force: Air Marshal Robert Chipman
- Chief of Navy: Vice Admiral Matthew Buckley
- Deputy Chief of Navy: Rear Admiral Darren Grogan
- Commander Australian Fleet: Rear Admiral Anita Williams

Insignia
- Naval ensign

- Naval jack

- Pennant

- King's Colours

- Logo

Aircraft flown
- Multirole helicopter: MH-60R Seahawk
- Trainer helicopter: EC-135T2+

The Royal Australian Navy (RAN) is the naval branch of the Australian Defence Force (ADF). The professional head of the RAN is the Chief of Navy (CN), Vice Admiral Matthew Buckley. The Chief of Navy is also jointly responsible to the Minister for Defence (MINDEF) and the Chief of the Defence Force (CDF). The Department of Defence, which is a part of the Australian Public Service, supports the ADF, and ergo, the Royal Australian Navy.

The navy was formed in 1901 as the Commonwealth Naval Forces (CNF) through the amalgamation of the colonial navies following the federation of Australia. Although it was originally intended for local defence, it became increasingly responsible for regional defence as the British Empire started to diminish its influence in the South Pacific.

The Royal Australian Navy was initially a green-water navy, as the Royal Navy provided a blue-water force to the Australian Squadron, which the Australian and New Zealand governments helped to fund; the squadron was assigned to the Australia Station. This period lasted until 1913, when naval ships purchased from Britain arrived, although the British Admiralty continued to provide blue-water defence capability in the Pacific and Indian Oceans up to the early years of the Second World War.

During its history, the Royal Australian Navy has participated in a number of major wars, including the First and Second World Wars, Korean War, Malayan Emergency, Indonesia-Malaysia Confrontation and the Vietnam War. As of 2025, the RAN consists of 36 commissioned vessels, 12 non-commissioned vessels and over 16,000 personnel. The navy is one of the largest and most sophisticated naval forces in the South Pacific region, with a significant presence in the Indian Ocean and worldwide operations in support of military campaigns and peacekeeping missions.

== History ==
=== Formation ===
The Commonwealth Naval Forces were established on 1 March 1901, with the amalgamation of the six separate colonial naval forces, following the Federation of Australia. The Commonwealth Navy initially consisted of the former New South Wales, Victorian, Queensland, Western Australian, South Australian and Tasmanian ships and resources of their disbanded navies.

The Defence Act 1903 established the operation and command structure of the Commonwealth Navy. When policymakers sought to determine the newly established force's requirements and purpose, there were arguments about whether Australia's naval force would be structured mainly for local defence or designed to serve as a fleet unit within a larger imperial force, controlled centrally by the British Admiralty. In 1908–09, a compromise solution was pursued, with the Australian government agreeing to establish a force for local defence but that would be capable of forming a fleet unit within the Royal Navy, albeit without central control. As a result, the navy's force structure was set at "one battlecruiser, three light cruisers, six destroyers and three submarines". The first of the Navy's new vessels, the destroyer HMAS Yarra, was completed in September 1910, and by the outbreak of the First World War the majority of the planned fleet had been realised. On 10 July 1911, the Navy was renamed the Royal Australian Navy, with the approval of King George V.

=== World War I ===
==== Pacific ====
Following the British Empire's declaration of war on Germany, the British War Office tasked the capture of German New Guinea to the Australian Government. This was to deprive the Imperial German Navy's East Asia Squadron of regional intelligence by removing their access to wireless stations. On 11 August, three destroyers and HMAS Sydney prepared to engage the squadron at German Anchorages in New Guinea, which did not eventuate as the vessels were not present. Landing parties were placed on Rabaul and Herbertshohe to destroy its German wireless station; however, the objective was found to be further inland and an expeditionary force was required. Meanwhile, HMAS Australia was tasked with scouring the Pacific Ocean for the German squadron.

The Australian Naval and Military Expeditionary Force (ANMEF) began recruiting on the same day that the taskforce arrived in New Britain, and consisted of two battalions: one of 1,000 men, and the other with 500 serving and former seamen. On 19 August, the ANMEF departed Sydney for training in Townsville before the rendezvous with other RAN vessels in Port Moresby. On 29 August, four cruisers and HMAS Australia assisted New Zealand's Samoa Expeditionary Force in landing at Apia, and committing a bloodless takeover of German Samoa. Additionally, the RAN captured German merchant vessels, disrupting German merchant shipping in the Pacific. On 7 September, the ANMEF, now including HMAS Australia, three destroyers, and two each of cruisers and submarines, departed for Rabaul.

A few days later, on 9 September, HMAS Melbourne landed a party to destroy the island's wireless station, though the German administration promptly surrendered. Between 11 and 12 September, landings were put ashore at Kabakaul, Rabaul and Herbertshohe; it was during this period that the first Australian casualties and deaths of the war occurred. On 14 September, HMAS Encounter barraged an enemy position at Toma with shells; it was the first time the RAN had fired upon an enemy and had shelled an inland location. On 17 September, German New Guinea surrendered to the encroaching ANMEF, with the overall campaign a success and exceeded the objectives set by the War Office. However, the RAN submarine HMAS AE1 became the first ever vessel of the new navy to be sunk. The Australian Squadron was placed under control of the British Admiralty, and was moreover tasked with protecting Australian shipping.

On 1 November, the RAN escorted the First Australian Imperial Force convoy from Albany, WA and set for the Khedivate of Egypt, which was soon to become the Sultanate of Egypt. On 9 November, HMAS Sydney began hunting for SMS Emden, a troublesome German coastal raider. The SMS Emden and HMAS Sydney met in the Battle of Cocos, the Emden was destroyed in Australia's first naval victory. Following the almost complete destruction of the East Asia Squadron in the Battle of the Falklands by the Royal Navy, the RAN became able to be reassigned to other naval theatres of the war.

==== Atlantic and Mediterranean ====
On 28 February 1915, the Royal Australian Naval Bridging Train (RANBT) was formed with members of the Royal Australian Naval Reserve who could not find billets in the RAN. Following the entrance of the Ottoman Empire in alliance with the Central Powers, HMAS AE2 was committed to the initial naval operation of the Gallipoli campaign. After the failure of the naval strategy, an amphibious assault was planned to enable the Allies' warships to pass through the Dardanelles and capture Constantinople. The RANBT was sent ashore, along with the invasion, for engineering duties.

Later in the war, most of the RAN's major ships operated as part of Royal Navy forces in the Mediterranean and North Seas, and then later in the Adriatic, and then the Black Sea following the surrender of the Ottoman Empire.

=== Interwar years ===
In 1919, the RAN received a force of six destroyers, three sloops and six submarines from the Royal Navy, but throughout the 1920s and early 1930s, the RAN was drastically reduced in size due to a variety of factors including political apathy and economic hardship as a result of the Great Depression. In this time the focus of Australia's naval policy shifted from defence against invasion to trade protection, and several fleet units were sunk as targets or scrapped. By 1923, the size of the navy had fallen to eight vessels, and by the end of the decade it had fallen further to five, with just 3,500 personnel. In the late 1930s, as international tensions increased, the RAN was modernised and expanded, with the service receiving primacy of funding over the Army and Air Force during this time as Australia began to prepare for war.

=== World War II ===
Early in the Second World War, RAN ships again operated as part of Royal Navy formations, many serving with distinction in the Mediterranean, the Red Sea, the Persian Gulf, the Indian Ocean, and off the West African coast. Following the outbreak of the Pacific War and the virtual destruction of Allied naval forces in Southeast Asia, the RAN operated more independently, defending against Axis naval activity in Australian waters, or participating in United States Navy offensives. As the navy took on an even greater role, it was expanded significantly and at its height the RAN was the fourth-largest navy in the world, with 39,650 personnel operating 337 warships, but no active submarines. A total of 34 vessels were lost during the war, including three cruisers and four destroyers.

=== Post war to present ===
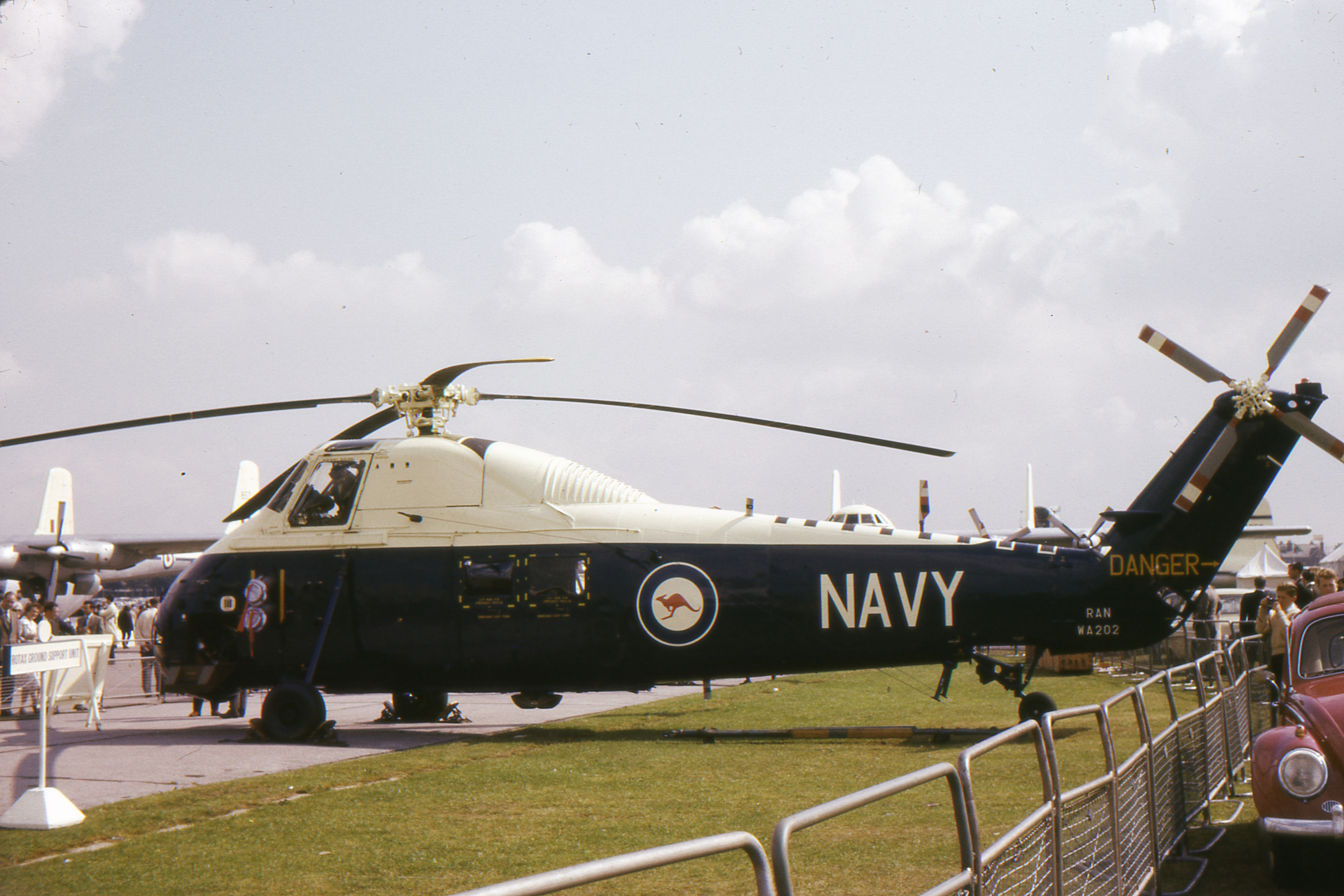
RAN Wessex helicopter in 1962

After the Second World War, the size of the RAN was again reduced, but it gained new capabilities with the acquisition of two aircraft carriers, Sydney and Melbourne. The RAN saw action in many Cold War–era conflicts in the Asia-Pacific region and operated alongside the Royal Navy and United States Navy off Korea, Malaysia, and Vietnam. Since the end of the Cold War, the RAN has been part of Coalition forces in the Persian Gulf and Indian Ocean, operating in support of Operation Slipper and undertaking counter piracy operations. It was also deployed in support of Australian peacekeeping operations in East Timor and the Solomon Islands.

The high demand for personnel in the Second World War led to the establishment of the Women's Royal Australian Naval Service (WRANS) branch in 1942, where over 3,000 women served in shore-based positions. The WRANS was disbanded in 1947, but then re-established in 1951 during the Cold War. It was given permanent status in 1959, and the RAN was the final branch to integrate women in the Australian military in 1985.

In April 2023, following the release of the Defence Strategic Review, the government sought an Independent analysis into Navy's surface fleet combatant fleet. In February 2024, the government released its response to the independent analysis.

== Structure ==
=== Command structure ===
The strategic command structure of the RAN was overhauled during the New Generation Navy changes. The RAN is commanded through Naval Headquarters (NHQ) in Canberra. NHQ is responsible for implementing policy decisions handed down from the Department of Defence and for overseeing tactical and operational issues that are the purview of the subordinate commands.

Beneath NHQ are two subordinate commands:

- Fleet Command: fleet command is led by Commander Australian Fleet (COMAUSFLT). COMAUSFLT holds the rank of rear admiral; previously, this post was Flag Officer Commanding HM's Australian Fleet (FOCAF), created in 1911, but the title was changed in 1988 to the Maritime Commander Australia. On 1 February 2007, the title changed again, becoming Commander Australian Fleet. The nominated at-sea commander is Commodore Warfare (COMWAR), a one-star deployable task group commander. Fleet command has responsibility to CN for the full command of assigned assets, and to Joint Operations command for the provision of operationally ready forces.
- Navy Strategic Command: the administrative element overseeing the RAN's training, engineering and logistical support needs. Instituted in 2000, the Systems Commander was appointed at the rank of commodore; in June 2008, the position was upgraded to the rank of rear admiral.

Fleet Command was previously made up of seven Force Element Groups, but after the New Generation Navy changes, this was restructured into four Force Commands:

- Fleet Air Arm (previously known as the Australian Navy Aviation Group), responsible for the navy's aviation assets and capability. As of 2018, the FAA consists of two front line helicopter squadrons (one focused on anti-submarine and anti-shipping warfare and the other a transport unit), two training squadrons and a trials squadron.
- Mine Warfare, Clearance Diving, Hydrographic, Meteorological and Patrol Forces, an amalgamation of the previous Patrol Boat, Hydrographic, and Mine Warfare and Clearance Diving Forces, operating what are collectively termed the RAN's "minor war vessels"
- Submarine Force, (Royal Australian Navy Submarine Service) operating the Collins-class submarines
- Surface Force, covering the RAN's surface combatants (generally ships of frigate size or larger)

=== Fleet ===
The Royal Australian Navy consists of over 50 commissioned vessels and over 16,000 personnel. Ships commissioned into the RAN are given the prefix HMAS (His/Her Majesty's Australian Ship).

The RAN has two primary bases for its fleet: the first, Fleet Base East, is located at HMAS Kuttabul, Sydney and the second, Fleet Base West, is located at HMAS Stirling, near Perth. In addition, three other bases are home to the majority of the RAN's minor war vessels: HMAS Cairns, in Cairns, HMAS Coonawarra, in Darwin, and HMAS Waterhen, in Sydney.

=== Clearance Diving Branch ===
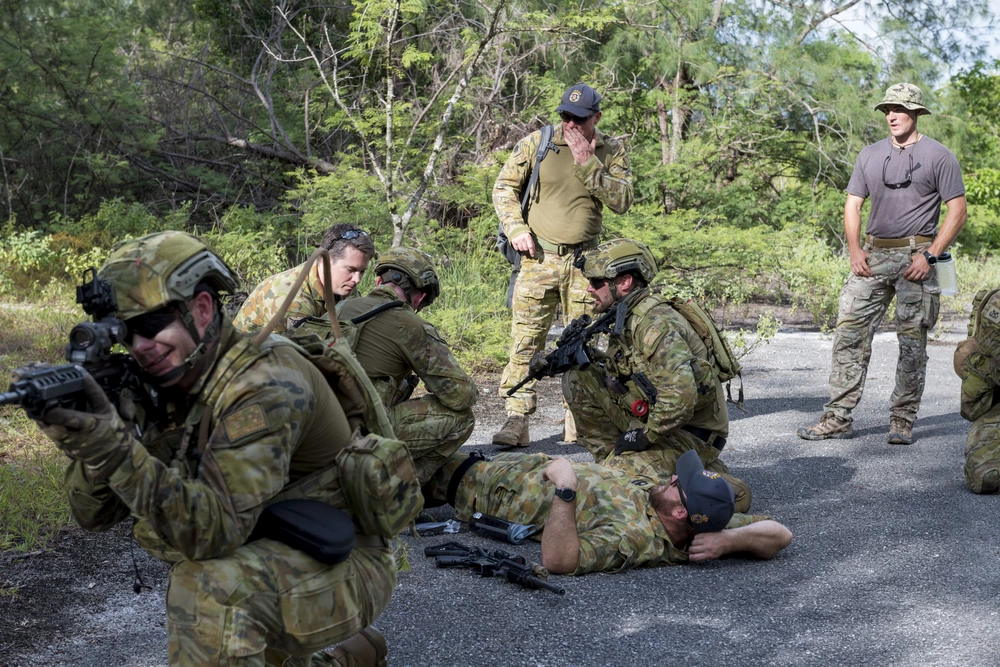
Australian Clearance Diving Team One conduct direct-action tactical manoeuvring during HYDRACRAB

The Clearance Diving Branch is composed of two Clearance Diving Teams (CDT) that serve as parent units for naval clearance divers:

- Clearance Diving Team 1 (AUSCDT ONE), based at HMAS Waterhen in New South Wales; and
- Clearance Diving Team 4 (AUSCDT FOUR), based at HMAS Stirling in Western Australia.

When clearance divers are sent into combat, Clearance Diving Team Three (AUSCDT THREE) is formed.

The CDTs have two primary roles:

- Mine counter-measures (MCM) and explosive ordnance disposal (EOD); and
- Maritime tactical operations.

== Personnel ==
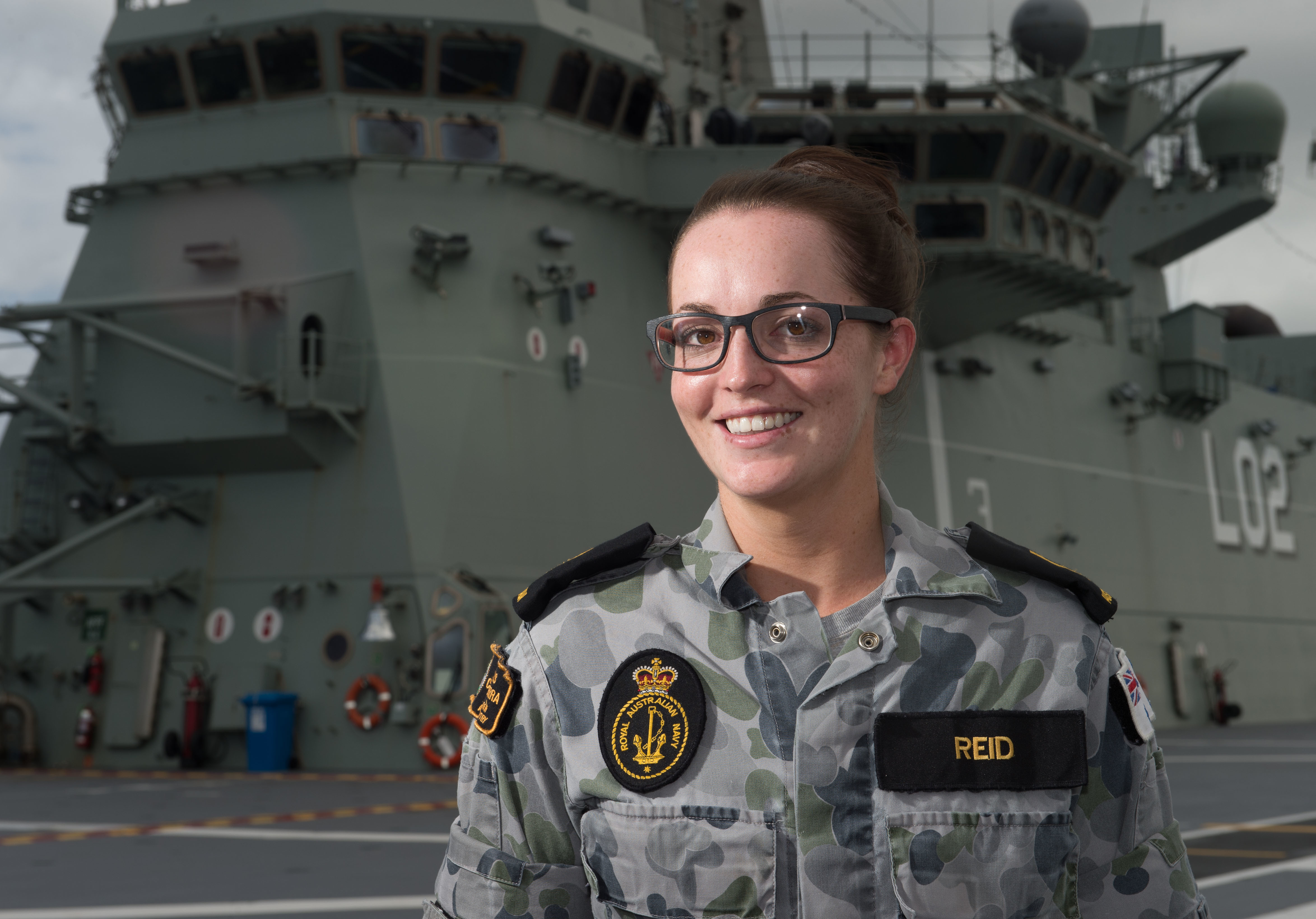
A female RAN sailor in 2016. Women serve in the RAN in combat roles and at sea.

As of June 2023, the RAN has 14,745 permanent full-time personnel, 172 gap-year personnel, and 4,607 reserve personnel. The permanent full-time trained force consists of 3,070 commissioned officers, and 9,695 enlisted personnel. Male personnel made up 75.9% of the permanent full-time force, while female personnel made up 24%. The RAN has the second-highest percentage of women in the permanent forces, compared to the RAAF's 26.6% and the Army's 15.3%. Throughout the 2022-23 financial year 1,141 enlisted in the RAN on a permanent basis while 1,354 left, representing a net loss of 213 personnel.

The following are some of the current senior Royal Australian Navy officers:

- Admiral David Johnston – Chief of the Defence Force
- Vice Admiral Matthew Buckley – Chief of Navy
- Vice Admiral Jonathan Mead – Chief Nuclear-Powered Submarine Taskforce
- Rear Admiral Darren Grogan – Deputy Chief of Navy
- Rear Admiral Anita Williams – Commander Australian Fleet
- Rear Admiral Matthew Buckley – Head Nuclear-Powered Submarine Capability
- Rear Admiral Stephen Hughes – Head Navy Capability
- Rear Admiral Rachel Durbin – Head Navy Engineering
- Rear Admiral David Greaves – Director-General Australian Navy Cadets
- Warrant Officer Andrew Bertoncin – Warrant Officer of the Navy

== Ranks and uniforms ==
=== Commissioned officers ===
Rank insignia of the commissioned officers of the Royal Australian Navy
Rank group	Officers of flag rank				Senior officers				Junior officers			Officer cadets
ADF code	O-11	O-10	O-9	O-8	O-7	O-6	O-5	O-4	O-3	O-2	O-1	N/A
Insignia												
Rank	Admiral of the fleet	Admiral	Vice admiral	Rear admiral	Commodore	Captain	Commander	Lieutenant commander	Lieutenant	Sub-lieutenant	Acting sub-lieutenant	Midshipman
Abbreviation	AF	ADML	VADM	RADM	CDRE	CAPT	CMDR	LCDR	LEUT	SBLT	ASLT	MIDN

Commissioned officers of the Australian Navy have pay grades ranging from S-1 to O-10. The highest rank achievable in the current Royal Australian Navy structure is O-10, an admiral who serves as the Chief of the Defence Force (CDF) when the position is held by a Naval Officer. The navy has a O-11 position Admiral of the Fleet that is honorary and is currently held by Charles III, King of Australia.

O-8 (rear admiral) to O-11 (admiral of the fleet) are referred to as flag officers, O-5 (commander) and above are referred to as senior officers, while S-1 (midshipman) to O-4 (lieutenant commander) are referred to as junior officers. All RAN Officers are issued a commission by the Governor-General as Commander-in-Chief on behalf of His Majesty King Charles III.

Naval officers are trained at the Royal Australian Naval College (HMAS Creswell) in Jervis Bay as well as the Australian Defence Force Academy in Canberra.

=== Sailors ===
Rank insignia of the sailors of the Royal Australian Navy
Rank group	Warrant officers		Senior sailors		Junior sailors		
ADF code	E-10	E-09	E-08	E-06	E-05	E-03	E-02
Shoulder insignia							
Arm insignia							No insignia
Rank	Warrant officer of the navy	Warrant officer	Chief petty officer	Petty officer	Leading seaman	Able seaman	Seaman
Abbreviation	WO-N	WO	CPO	PO	LS	AB	SMN

Although the Royal Australian Navy historically referred to these ranks as 'ratings' in the same fashion as the Royal Navy and other Commonwealth navies, this was replaced by the term 'sailors' in 1965 as it was decided that this term would be better understood outside naval circles.

=== Rate insignia ===
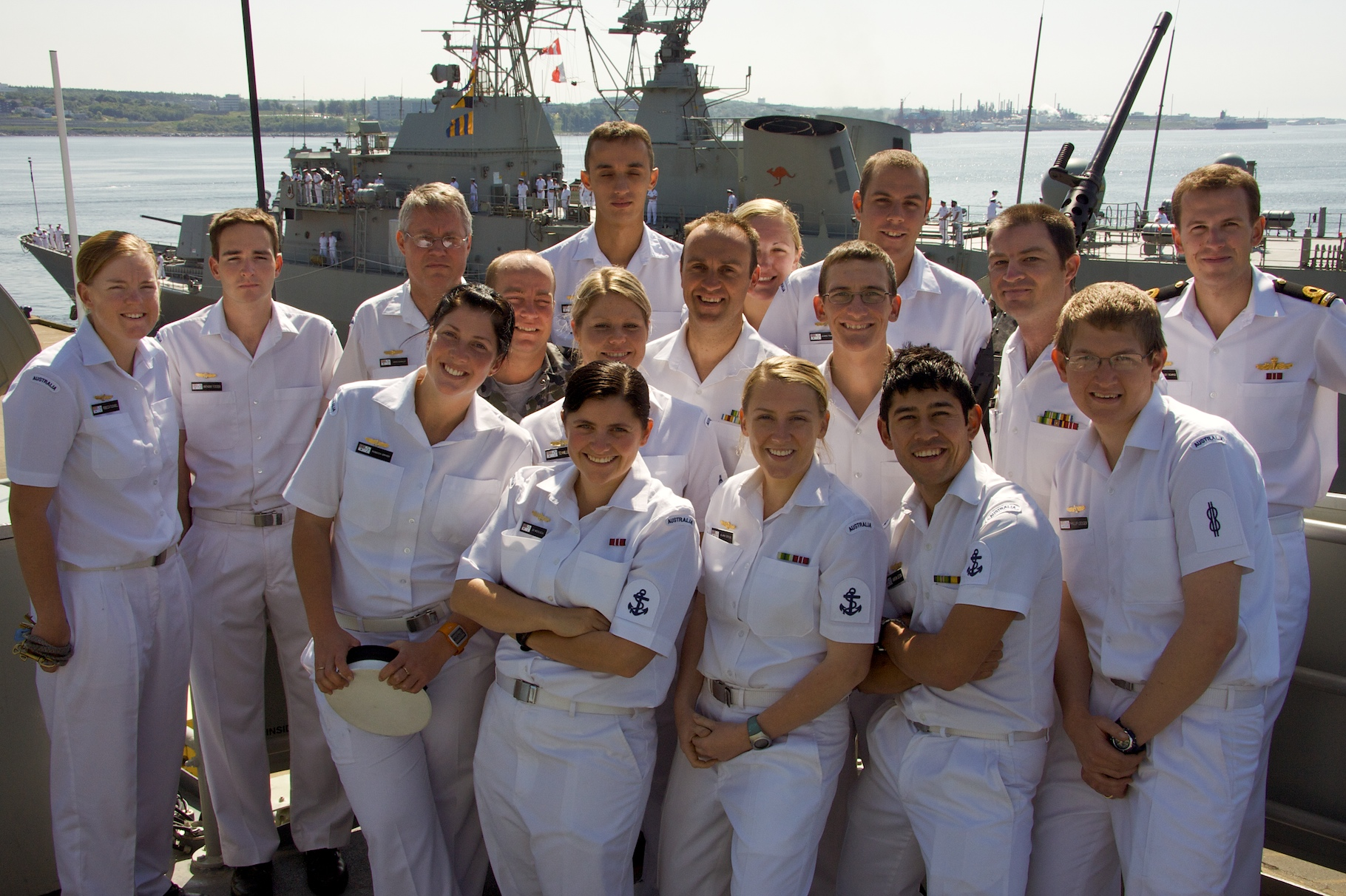
Royal Australian Navy sailors from HMAS Sydney during Operation Northern Trident 2009

Royal Australian Navy sailors wear "right arm rates" insignia, called "Category Insignia" to indicate specialty training qualifications. This is a holdover from the Royal Navy.

==== Special insignia ====
The Warrant Officer of the Navy (WO-N) is an appointment held by the most senior sailor in the RAN and holds the rank of warrant officer (WO). However, the WO-N does not wear the WO rank insignia; instead, they wear the special insignia of the appointment. The WO-N appointment has similar equivalent appointments in the other services, each holding the rank of warrant officer, each being the most senior sailor/soldier/airman in that service, and each wearing their own special insignia rather than their rank insignia. The Australian Army equivalent is the Regimental Sergeant Major of the Army (RSM-A) and the Royal Australian Air Force equivalent is the Warrant Officer of the Air Force (WOFF-AF).

==== Chaplains and Maritime Spiritual Wellbeing Officers ====
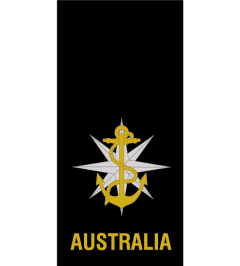
Rank Insignia for Royal Australian Navy Chaplains and Maritime Spiritual Wellbeing Officers (from 2021).

Chaplains in the Royal Australian Navy are commissioned officers who complete the same training as other officers in the RAN at the Royal Australian Naval College, HMAS Creswell. From July 2020, Maritime Spiritual Wellbeing Officers (MSWOs) were introduced to the Navy Chaplaincy Branch, designed to give Navy people and their families with professional, non-religious pastoral care and spiritual support.

In the Royal Australian Navy, Chaplains and MSWOs are commissioned officers without rank. For reasons of protocol, ceremonial occasions and for saluting purposes, they are, where appropriate, normally grouped with Commanders (O-5). The more senior Division 4 Senior Chaplains are grouped with Captains (O-6) and Division 5 Principal Chaplains are grouped with Commodores (O-7), but their rank slide remains the same. Principal Chaplains and MSWOs, however, have gold braid on the peak of their white service cap.

From January 2021, MSWOs and all chaplains wear the branch's new non-faith-specific rank insignia of a fouled anchor overlaying a compass rose, which represents a united team front, encompassing all faiths and purpose. Chaplains and MSWOs have insignia that reflect their religion on collar mounted patches (Cross for Christian, Crescent for Muslim etc, Compass rose for MSWOs.)

== Ships and equipment ==
=== Current ships ===
The RAN currently operates 32 commissioned vessels, made up of 11 ship classes, plus 12 non-commissioned vessels. In addition, DMS Maritime operates a large number of civilian-crewed vessels under contract to the Australian Defence Force.

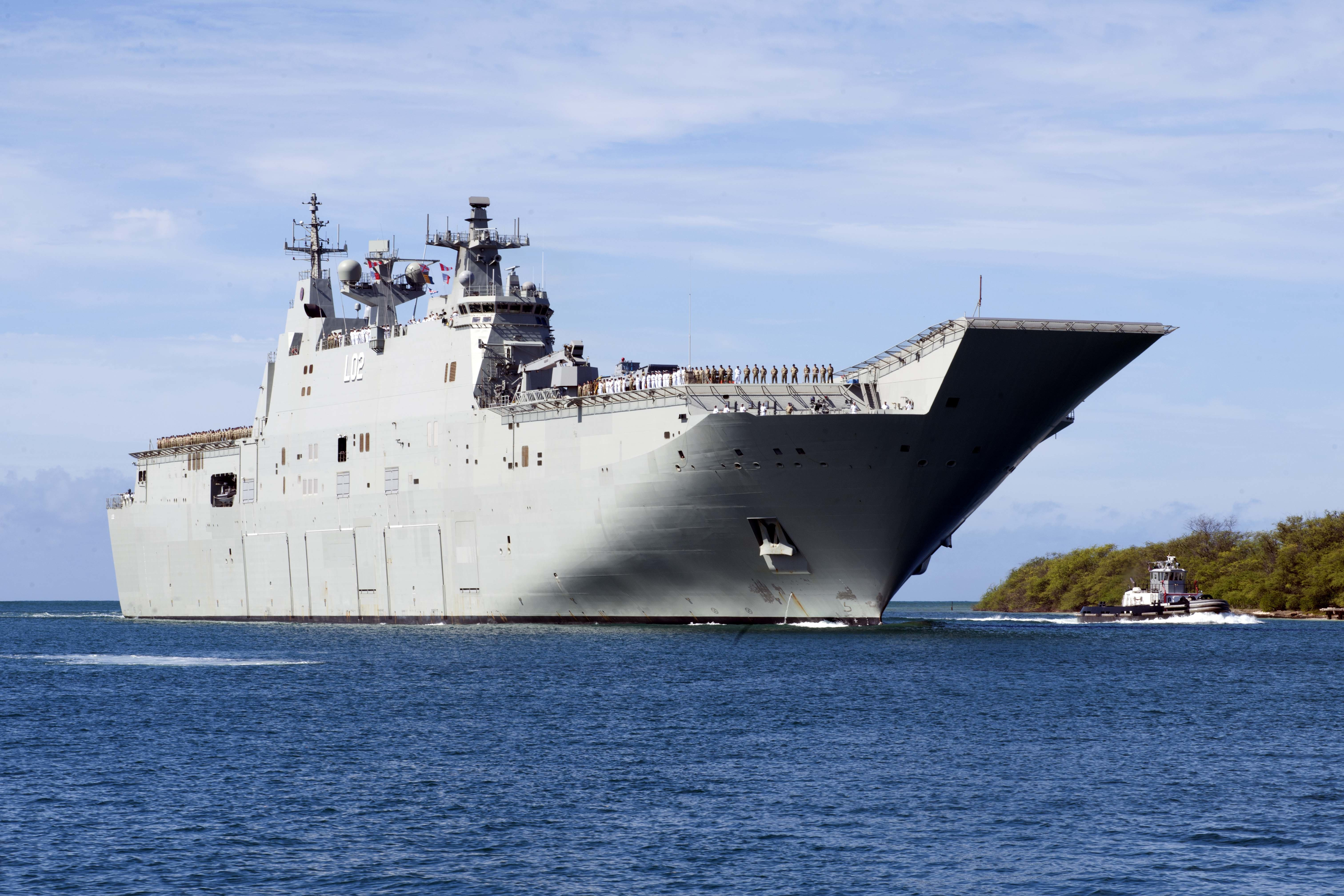
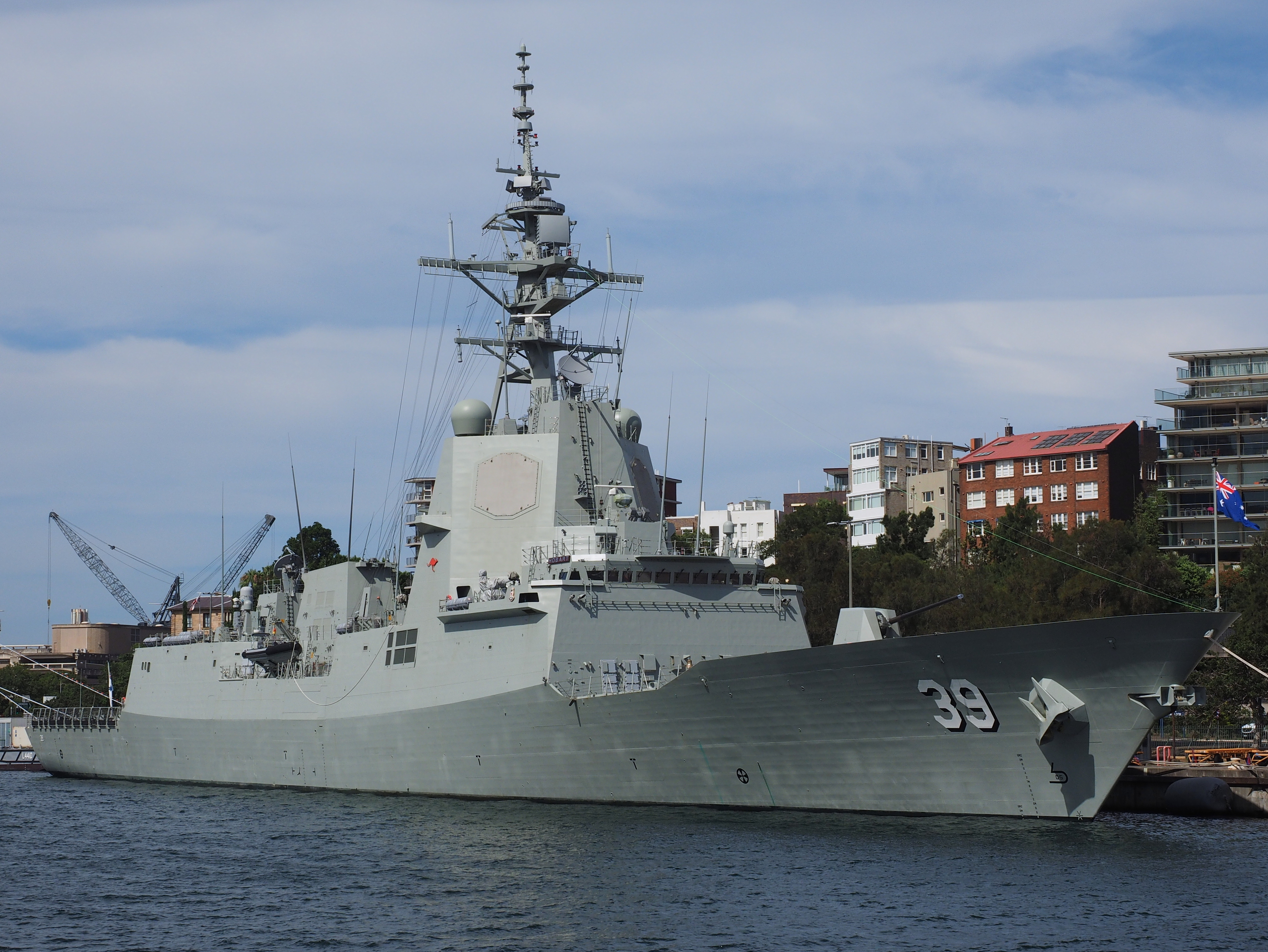
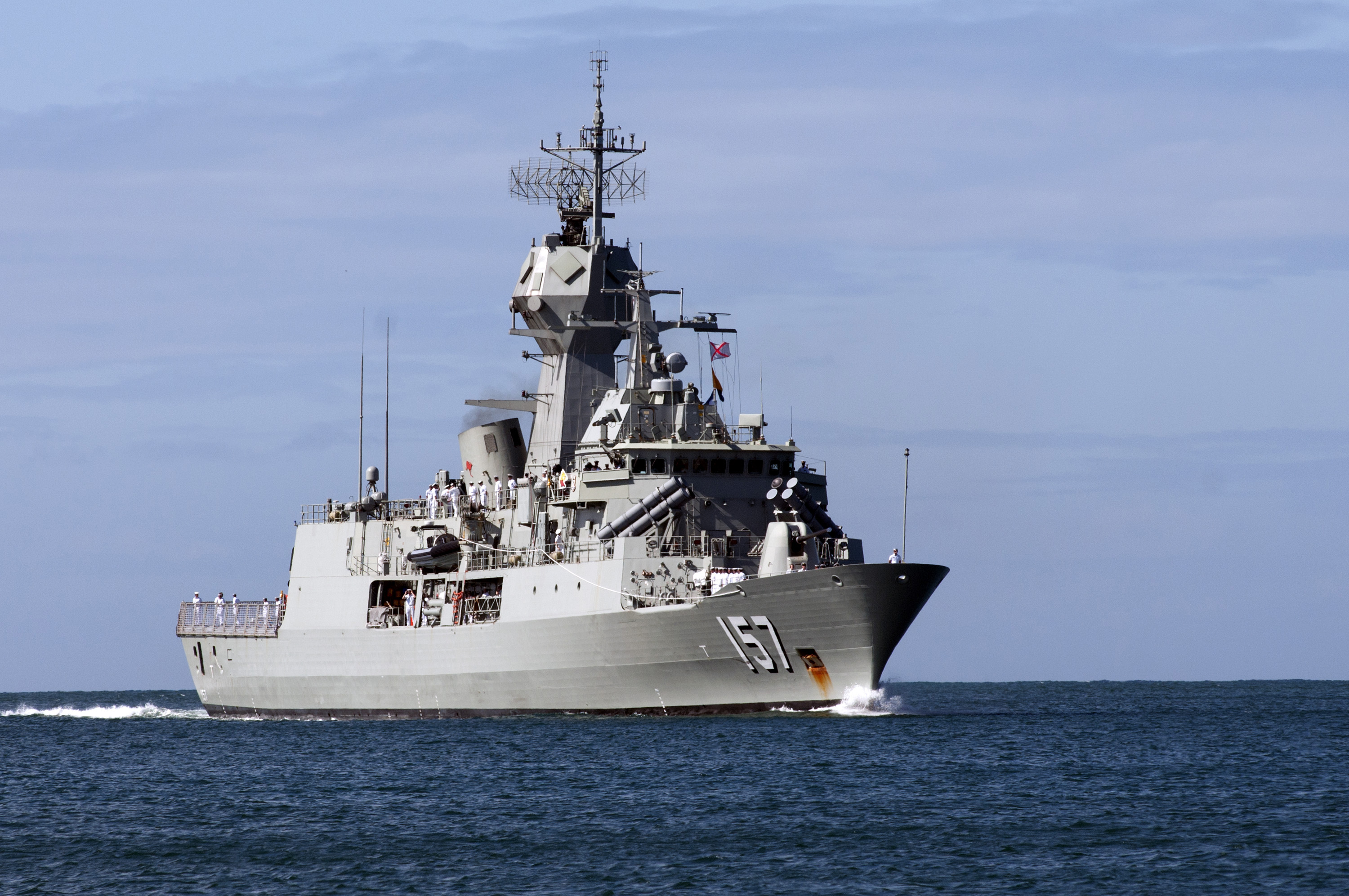
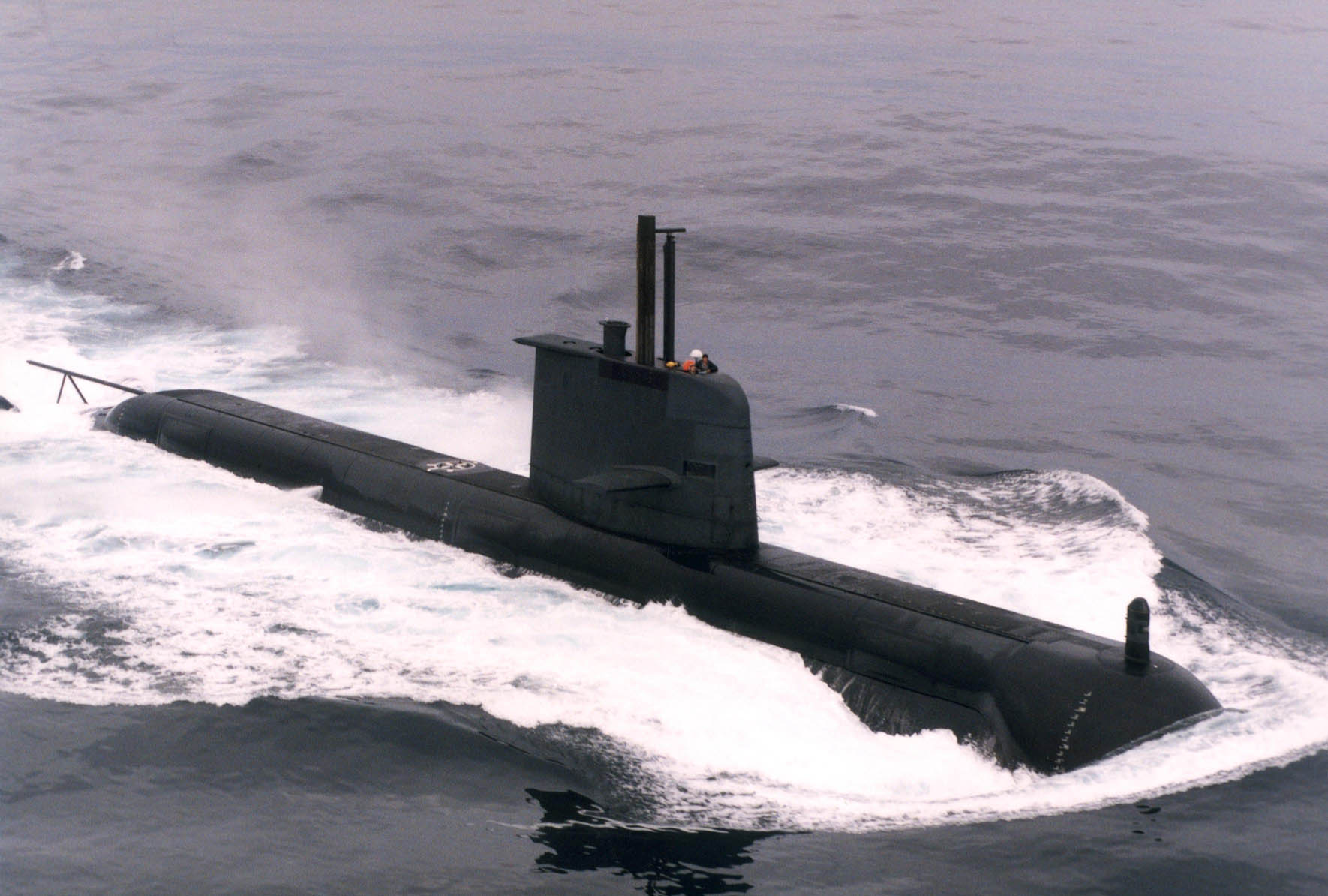
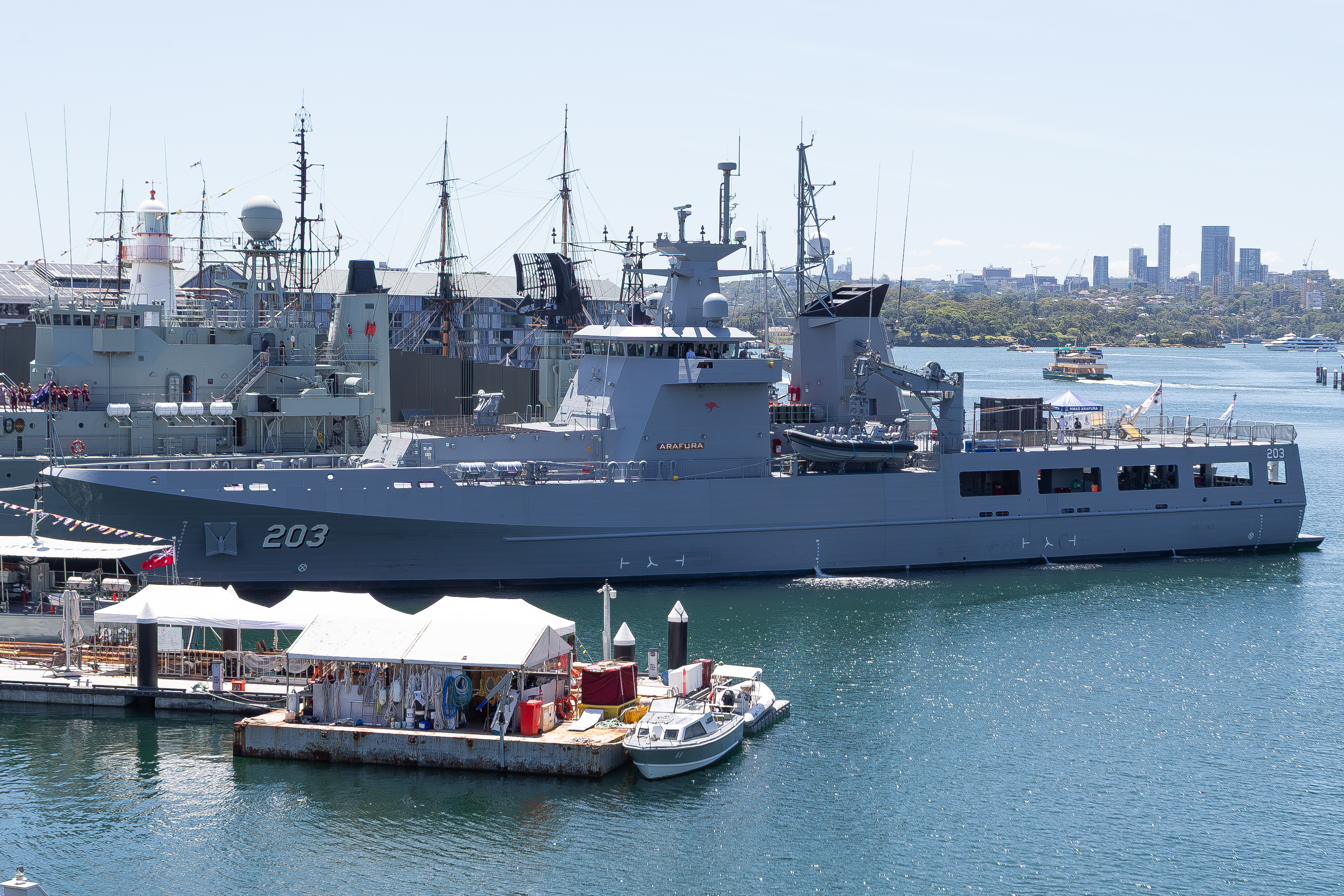
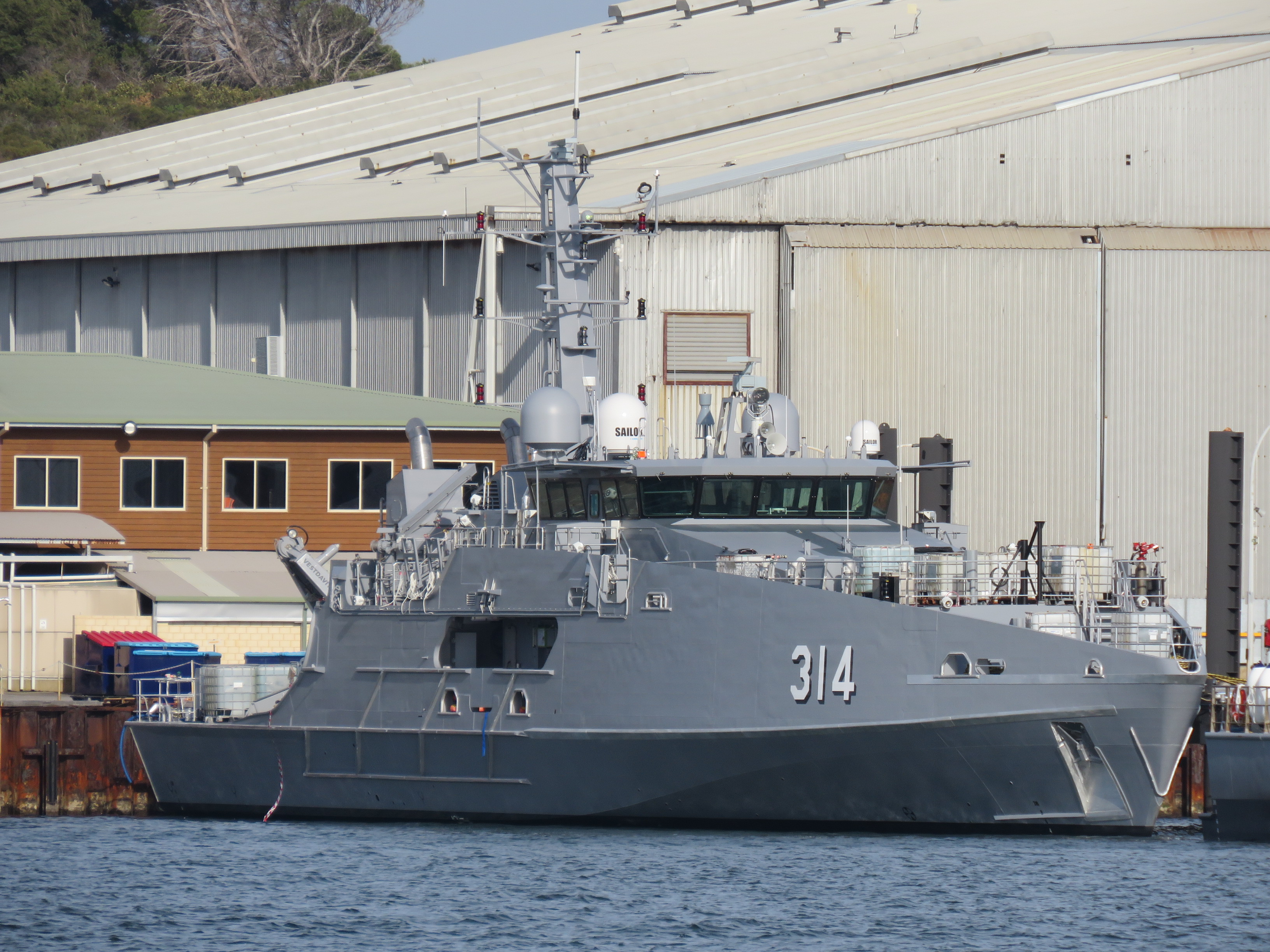
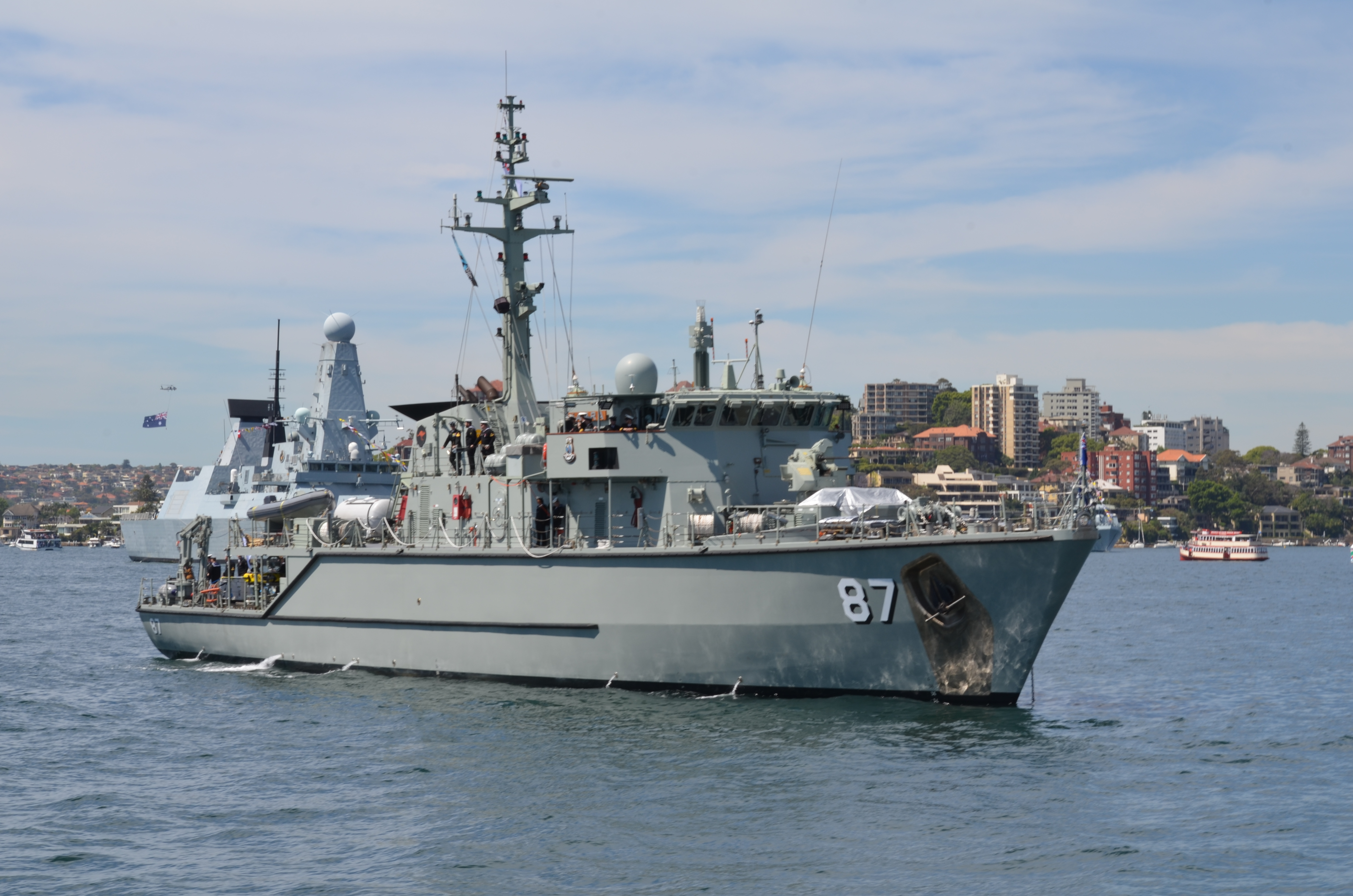
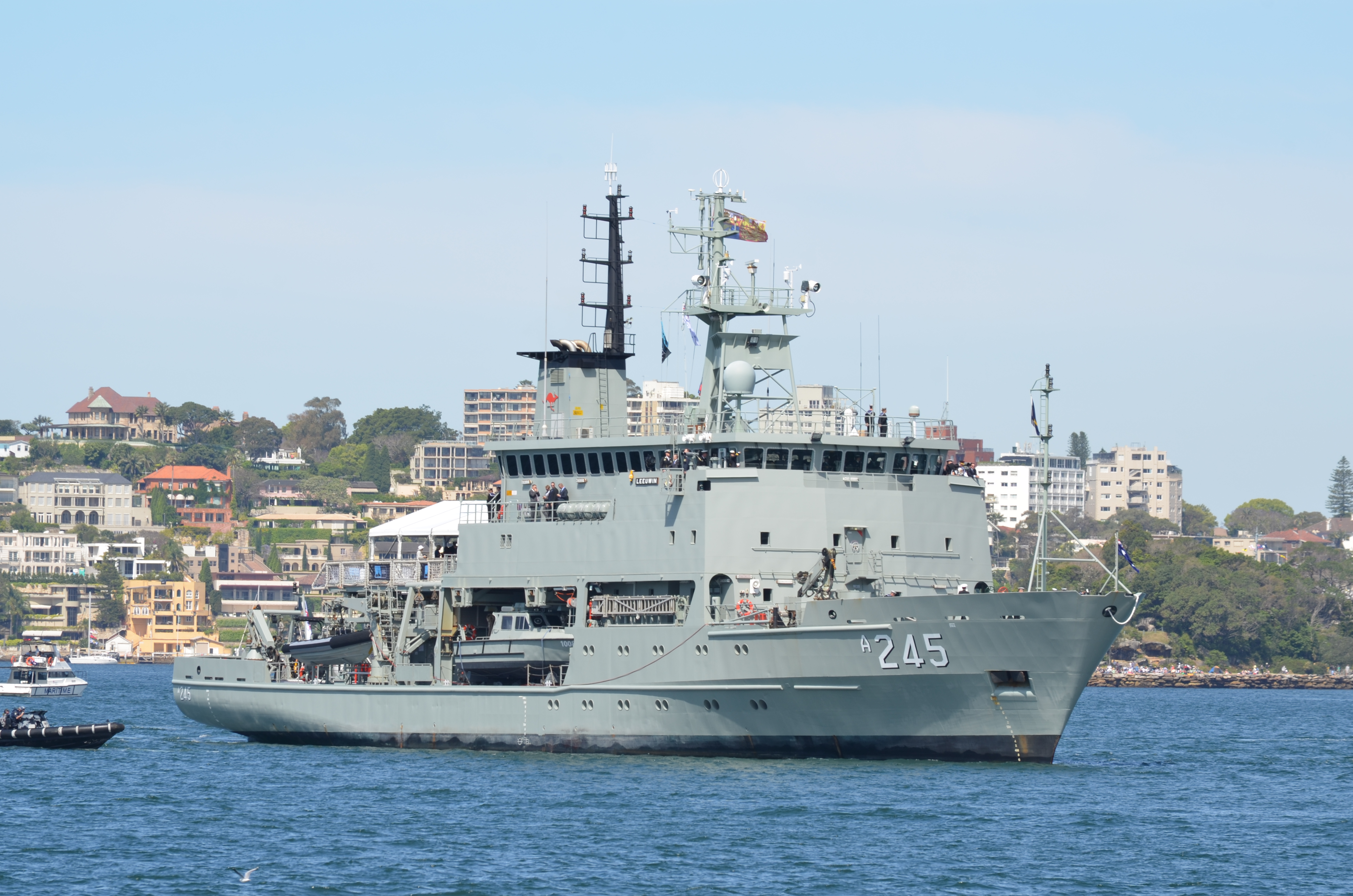
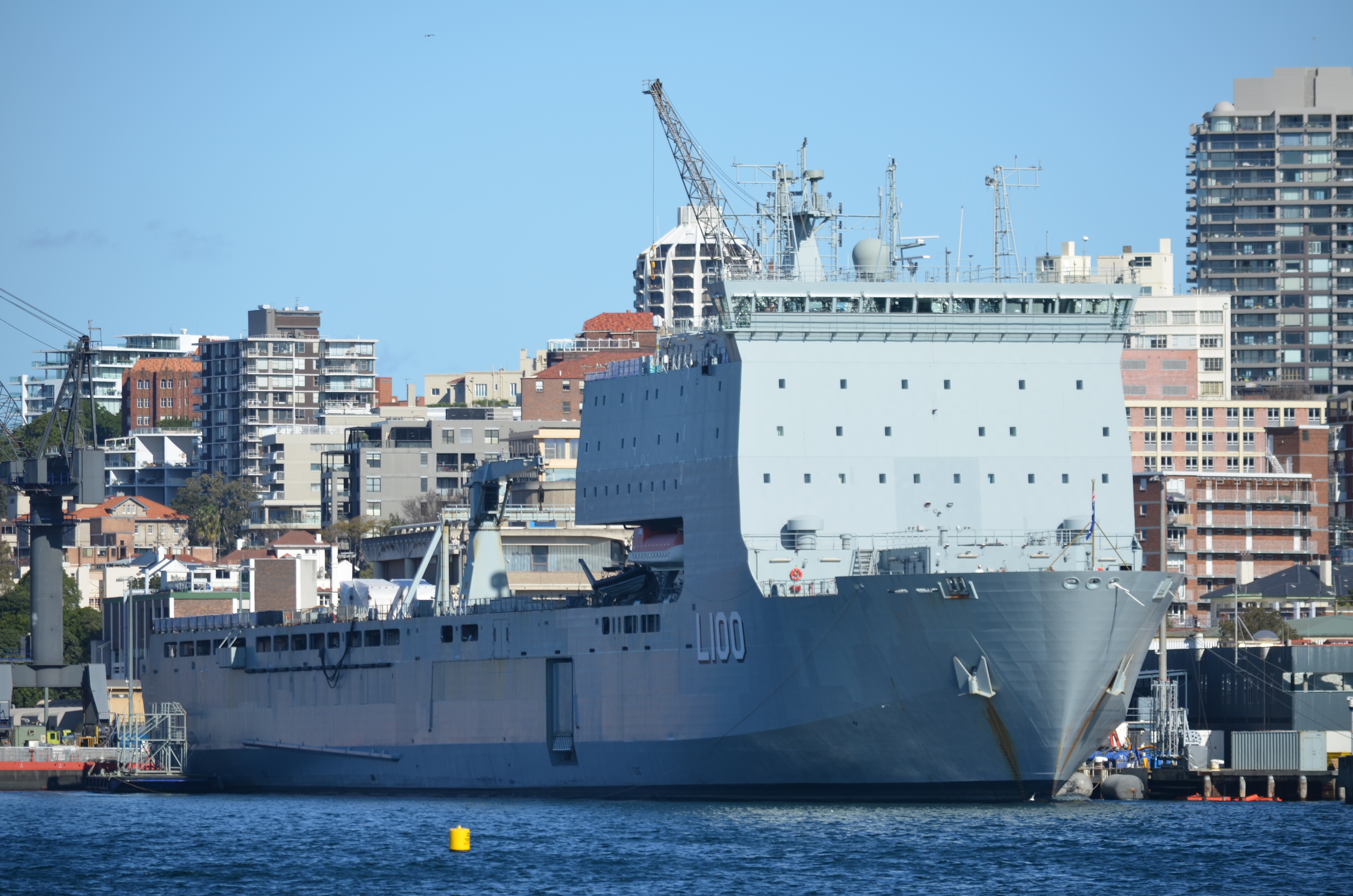
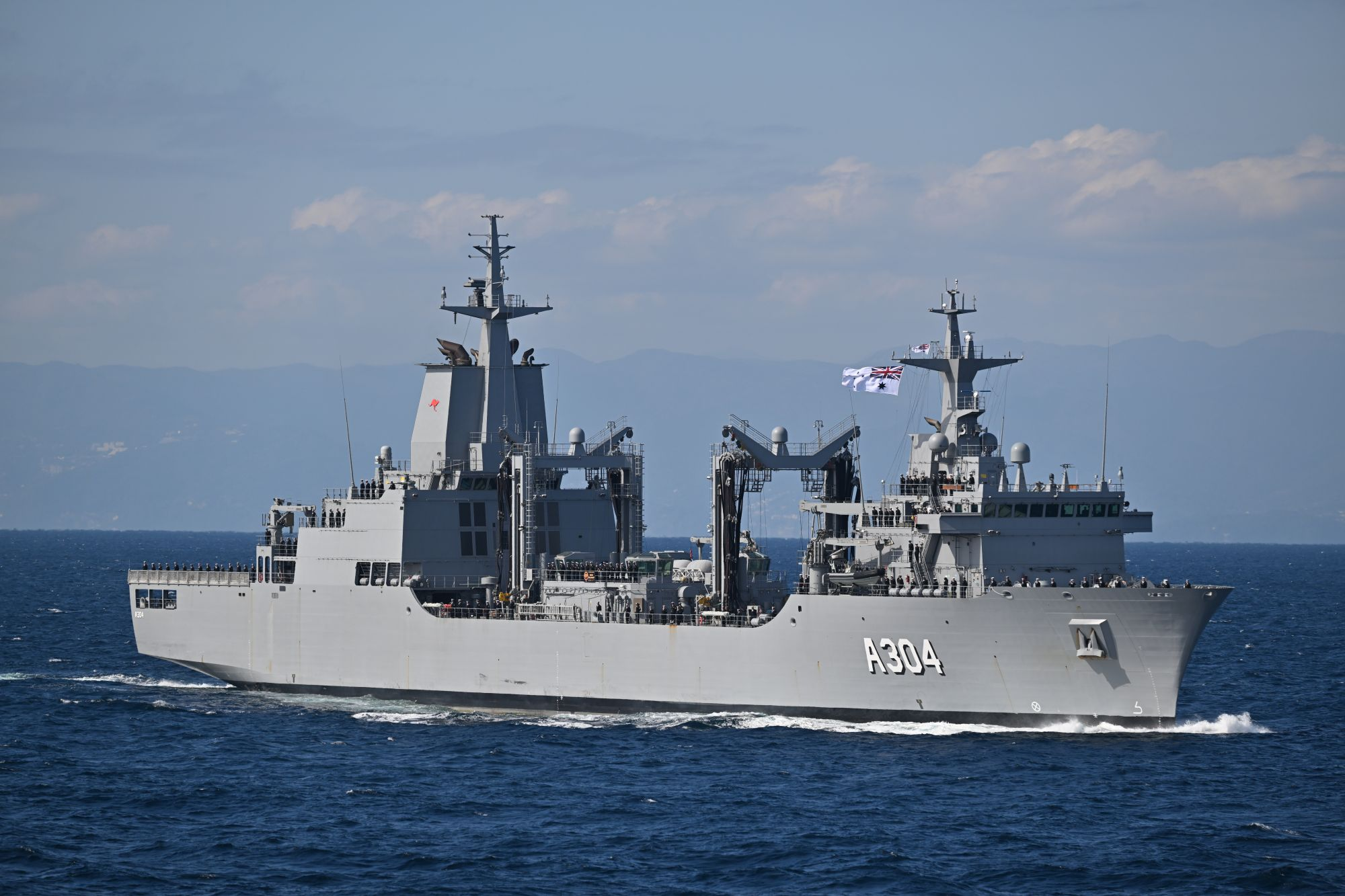
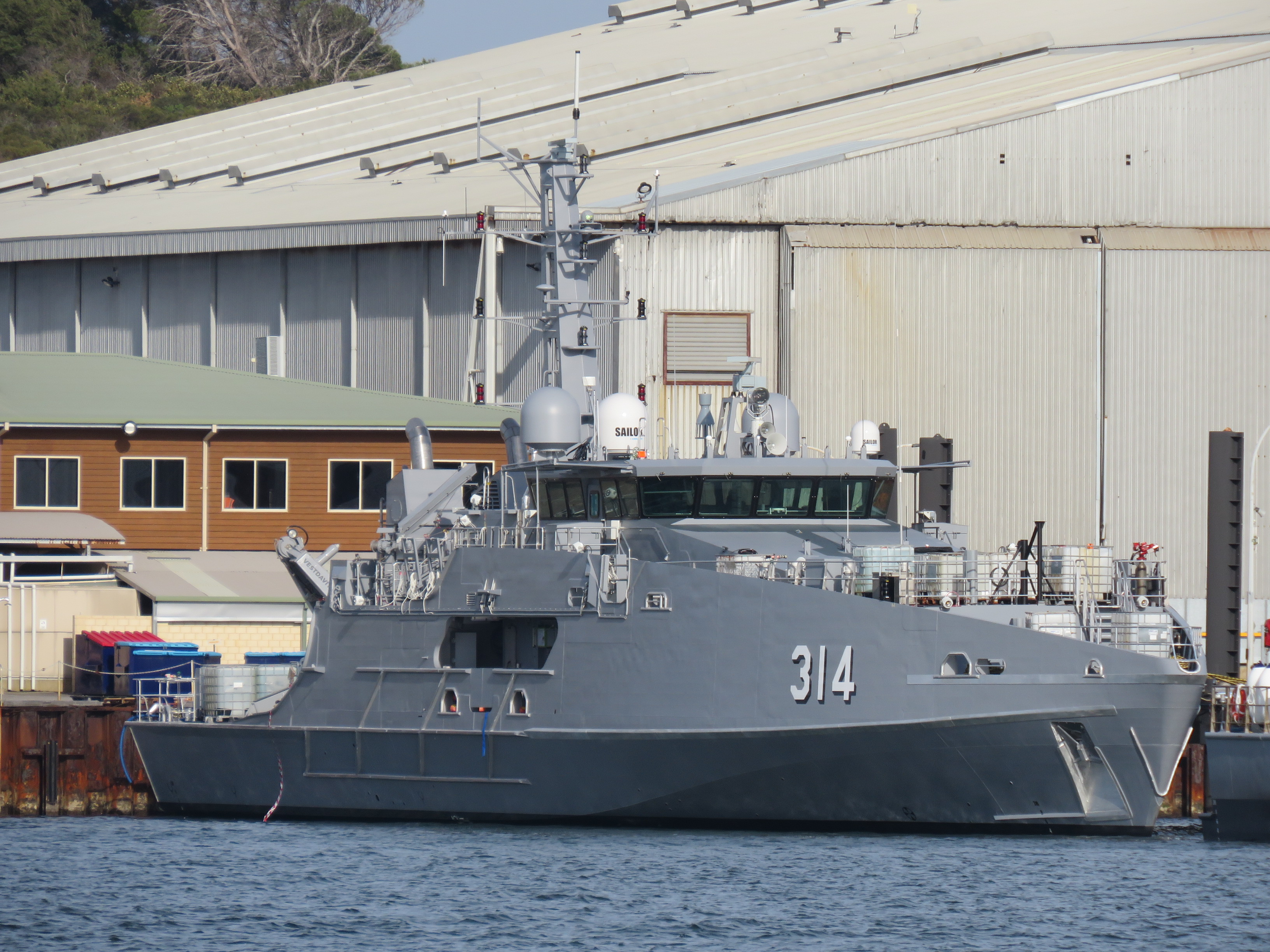
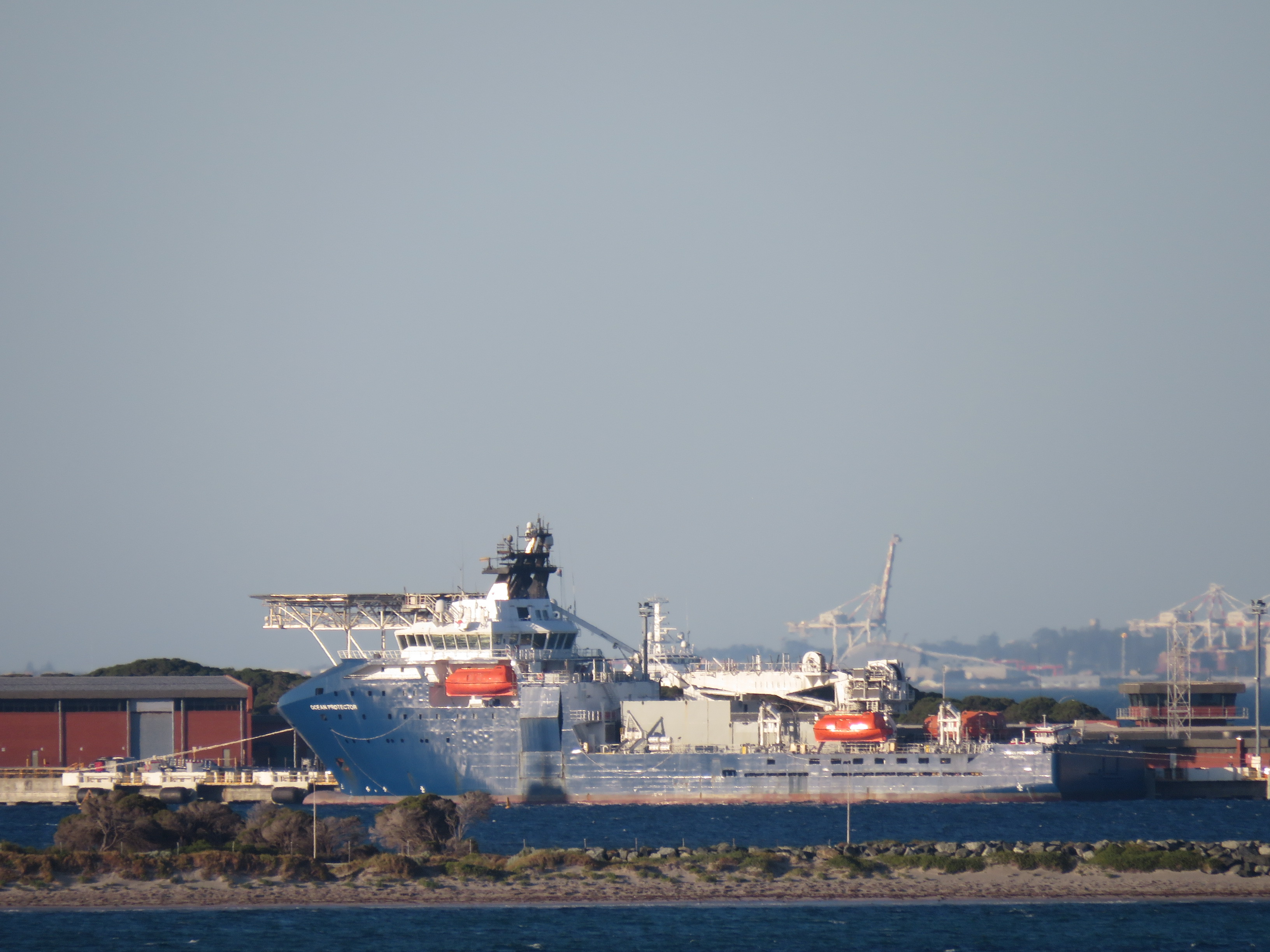
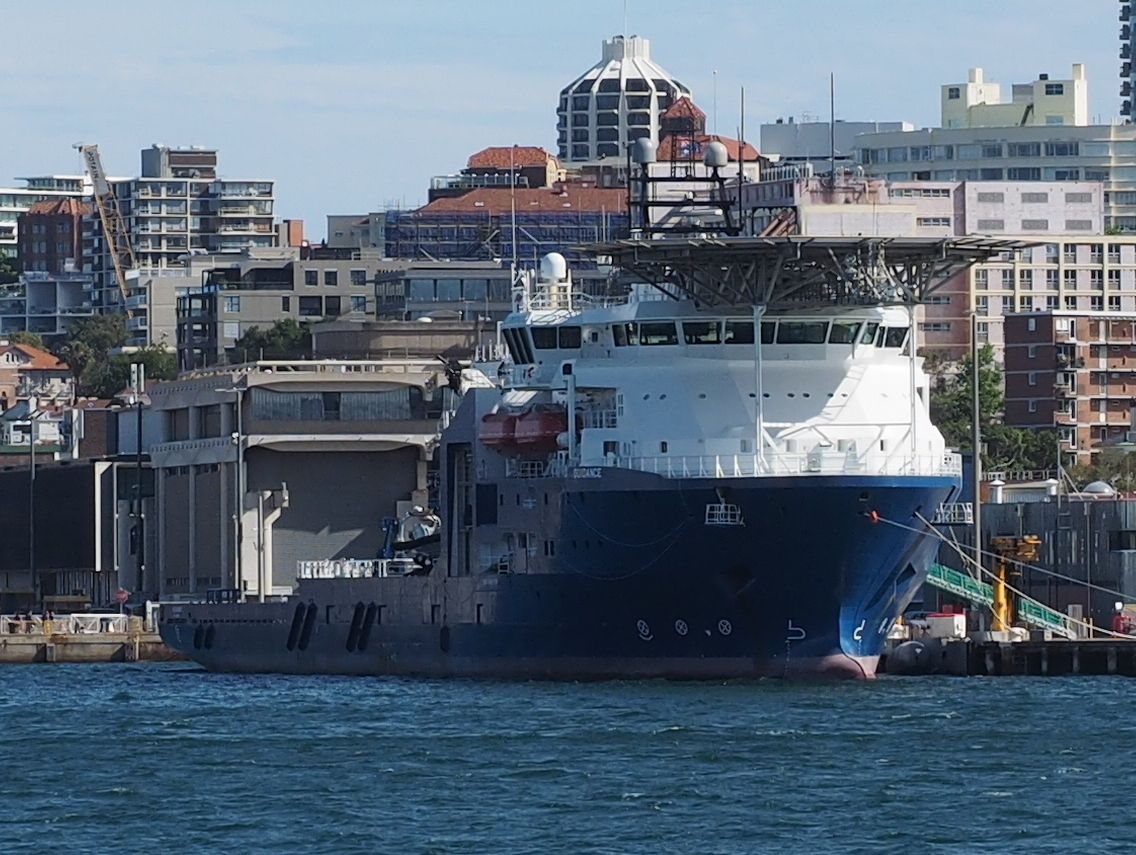
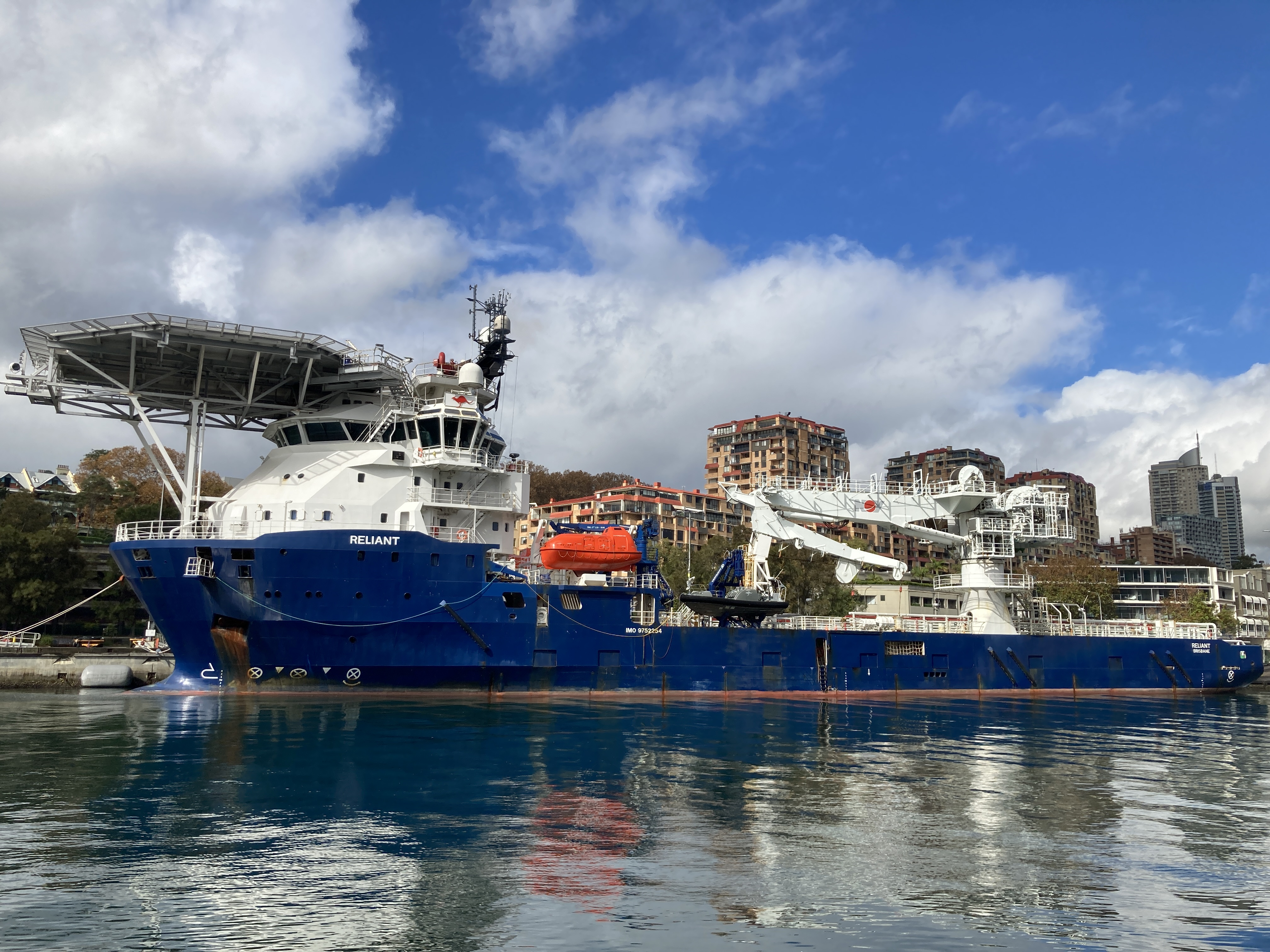
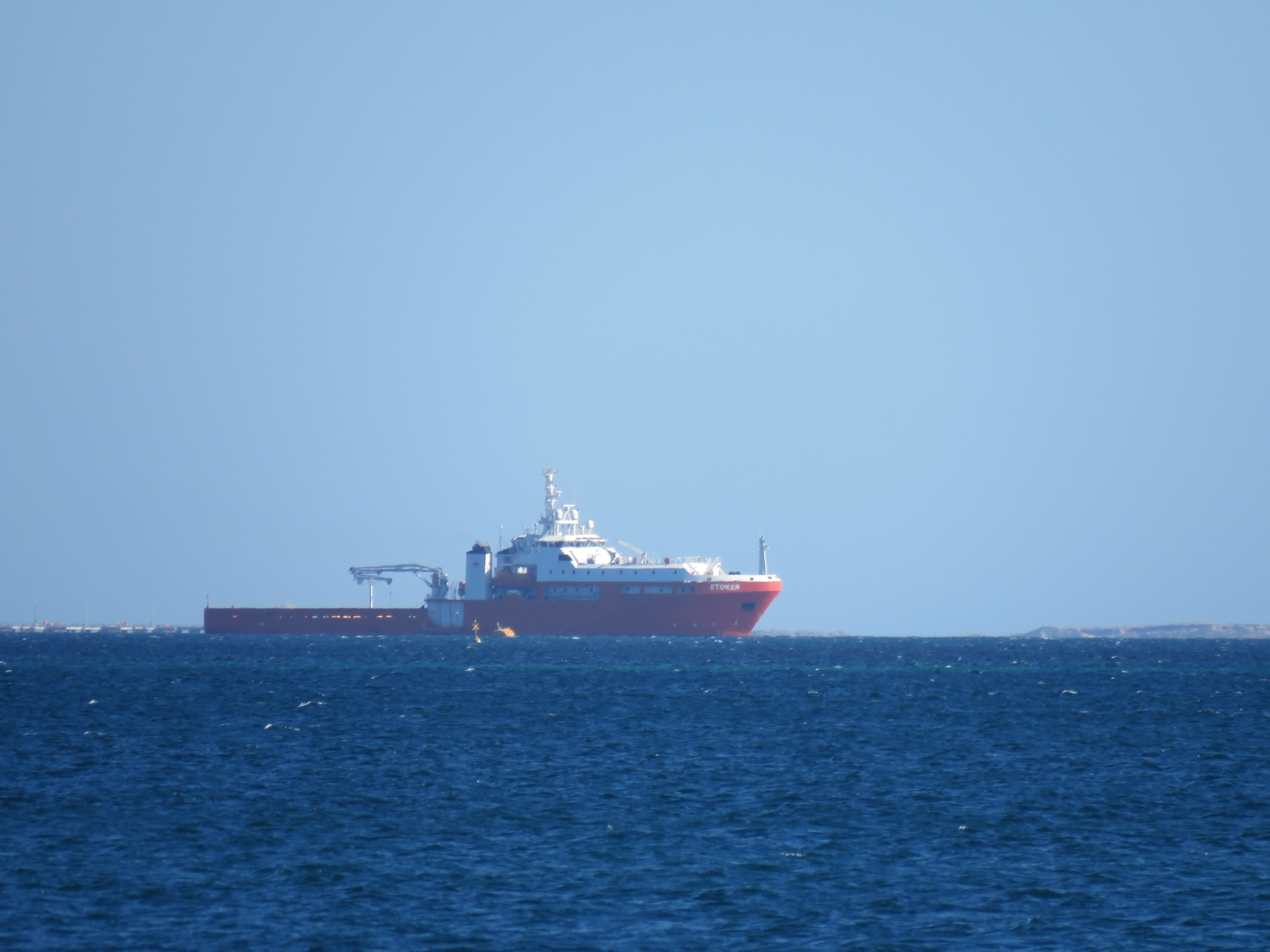
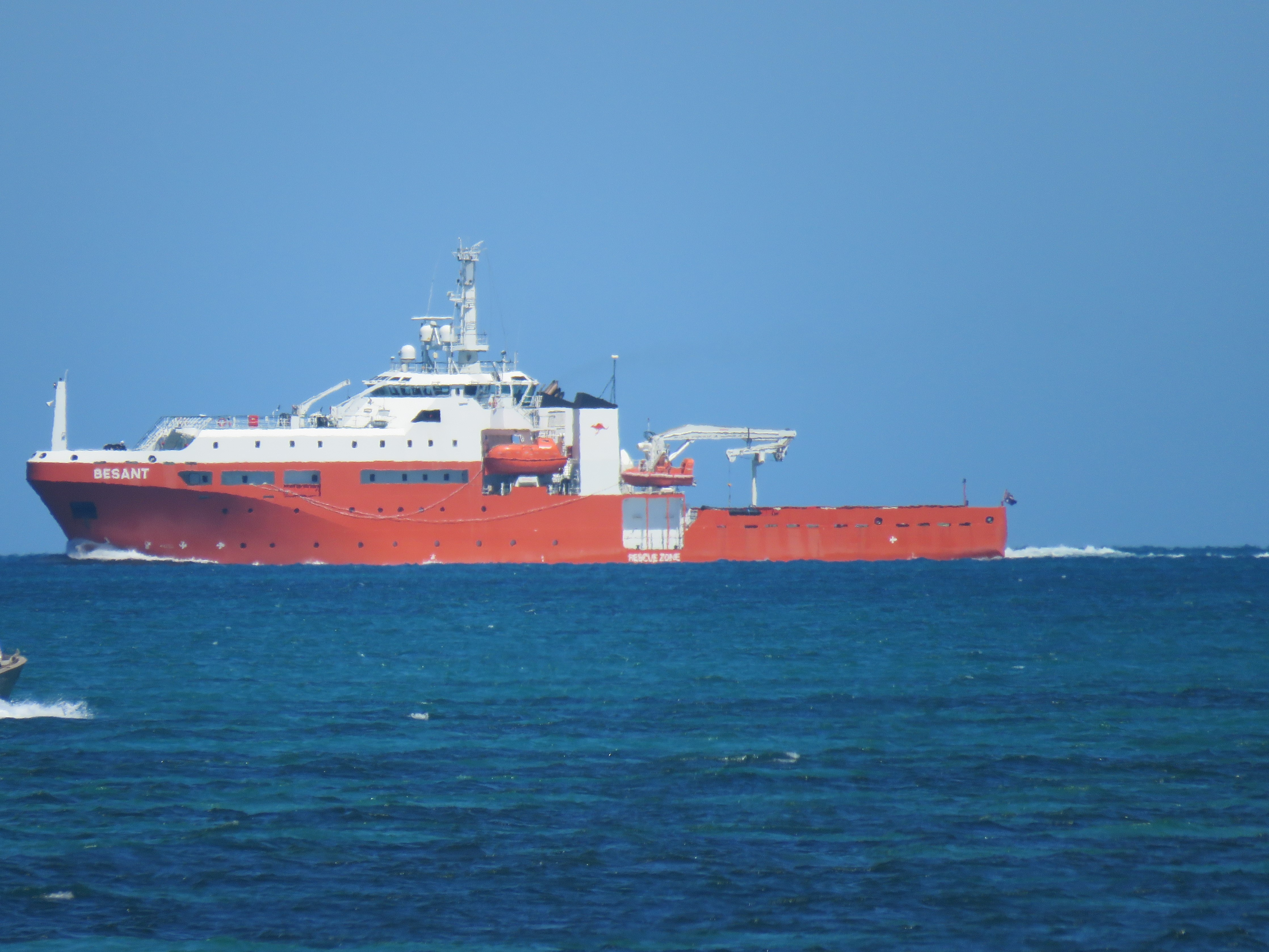
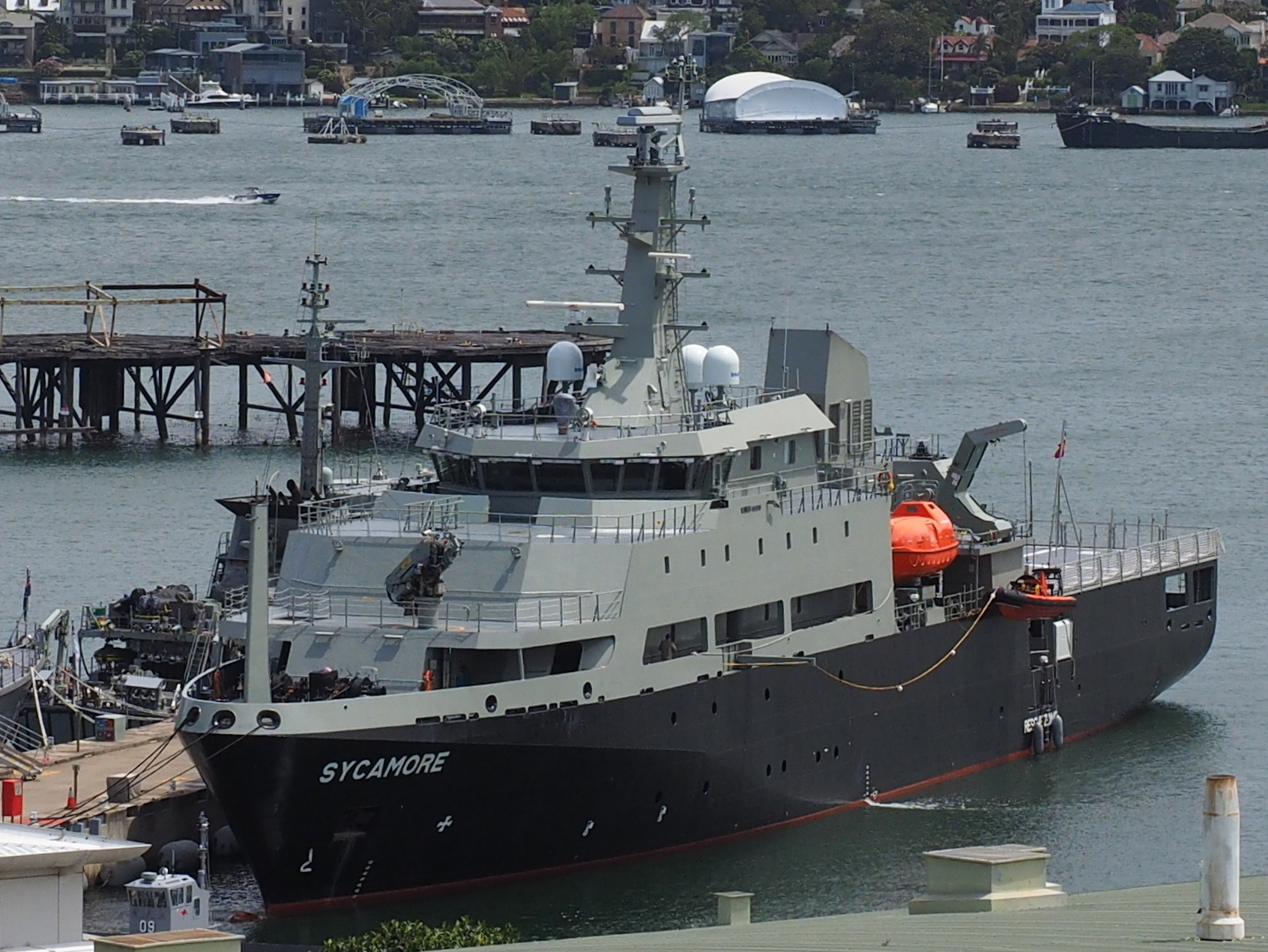
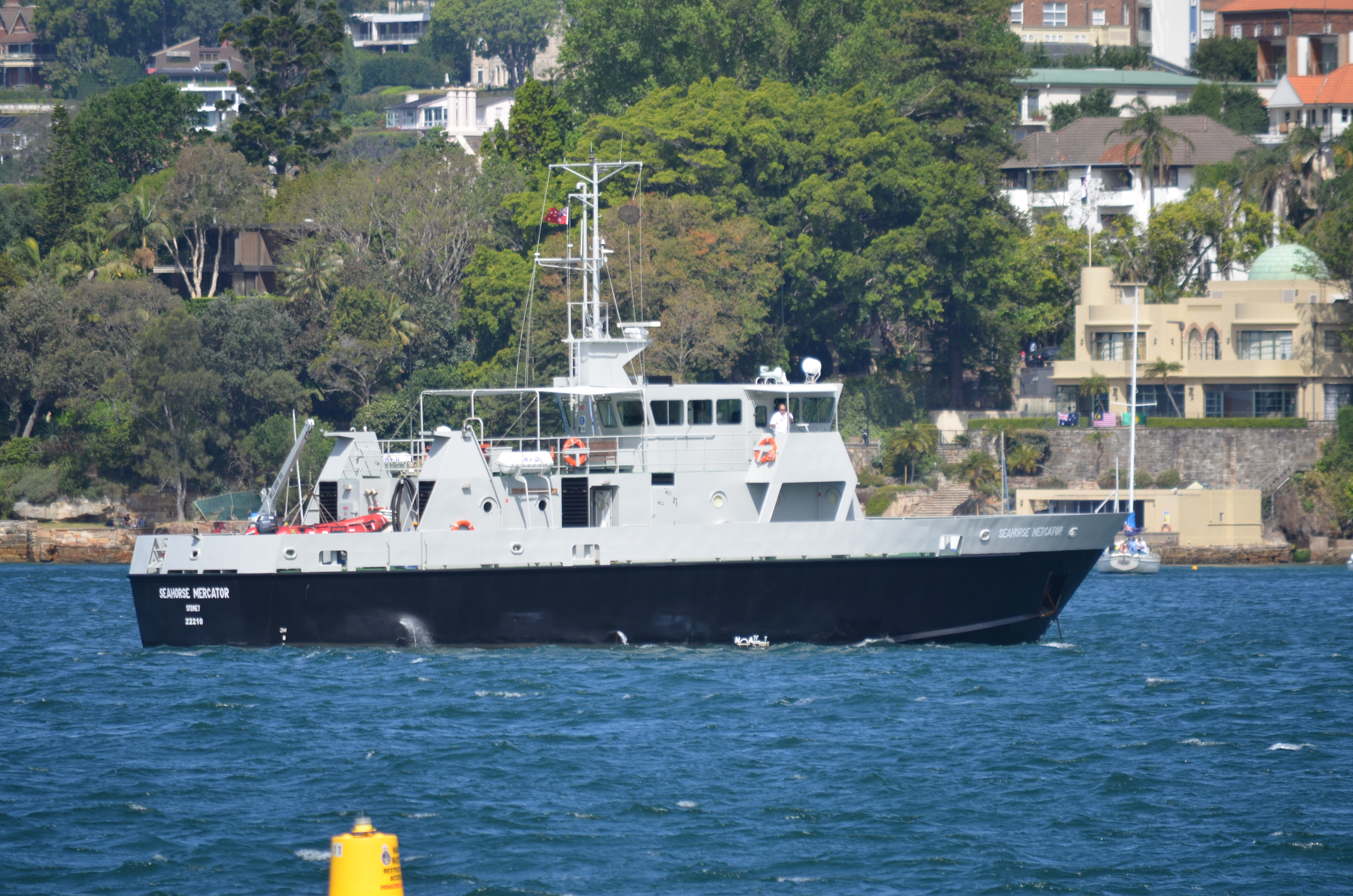
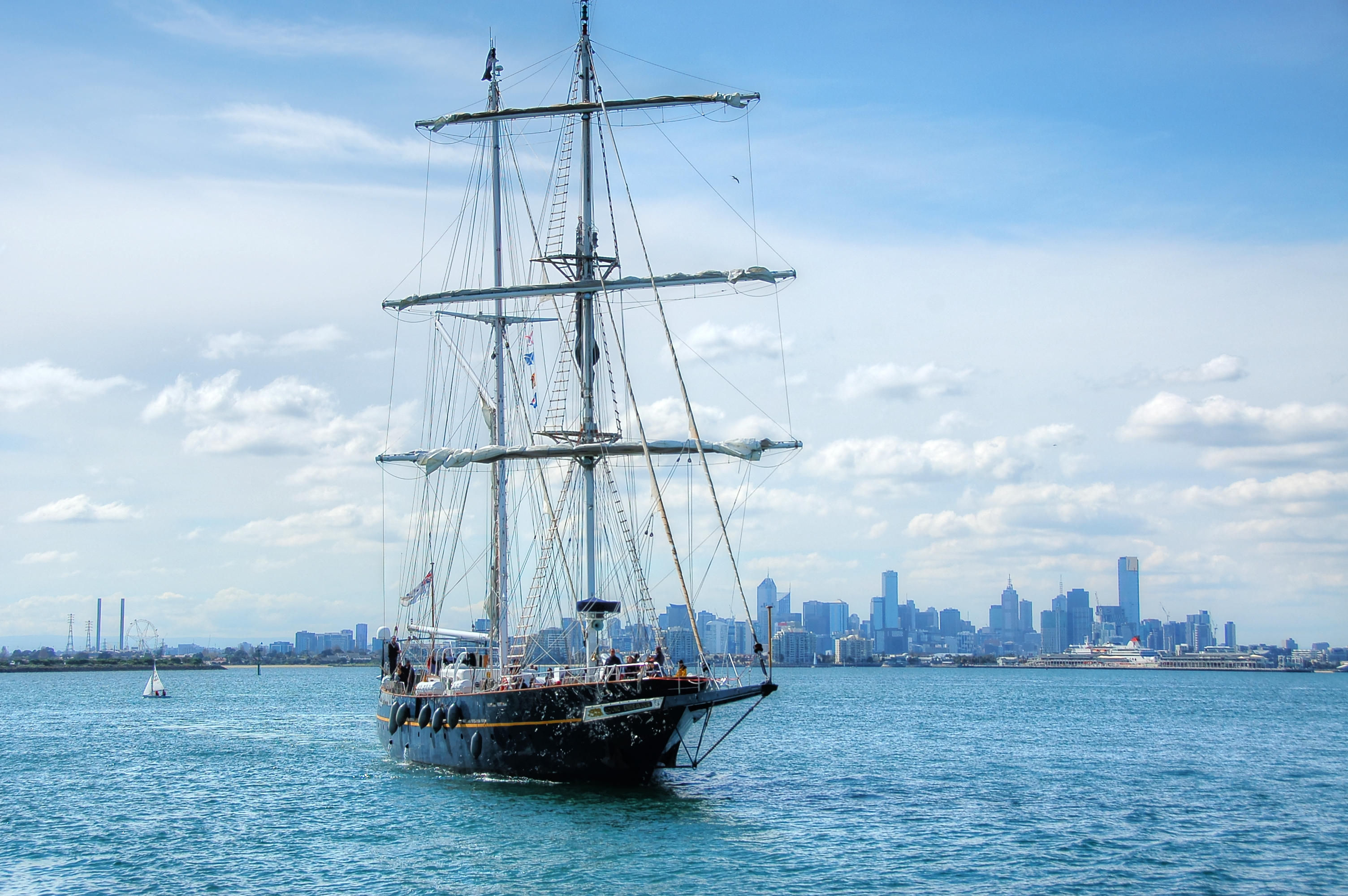
Image	Class/name	Type	Number	Entered service	Details
Commissioned vessels
HMAS Canberra, Canberra class	Canberra class	Amphibious assault ship	2	2014	Amphibious warfare ships with helicopter carrier capacity.
	Hobart class	Destroyer	3	2017	Air warfare destroyer.
HMAS Perth, Anzac class	Anzac class	Frigate	7	1996	Anti-submarine and anti-aircraft frigate with one helicopter. Two more were built for the Royal New Zealand Navy. Will be replaced by the Australian general purpose frigate program.
HMAS Collins, Collins class	Collins class	Submarine	6	1996	Anti-shipping, intelligence collection. Diesel-electric powered.
	Arafura class	Offshore patrol vessel	2	2025	Offshore maritime constabulary.
An as yet unnamed Cape-class patrol boat at Austal shipyards in Henderson, Western Australia	Cape class	Patrol boat	8	2017	Maritime constabulary. Eight Cape-class vessels commissioned as of February 2026 with the remaining two operating un-commissioned.
HMAS Yarra, Huon class	Huon class	Minehunter	2	1997	Minehunting.
HMAS Leeuwin, Leeuwin class	Leeuwin class	Survey ship	1	2000	Hydrographic survey.
HMAS Choules FBE 2014	Bay class	Landing ship dock	1	2011	Heavy sealift and transport.
HMAS Stalwart	Supply class	Replenishment oiler	2	2021	Replenishment at sea and afloat support.
Non-commissioned vessels
An as yet unnamed Cape-class patrol boat at Austal shipyards in Henderson, Western Australia	Cape class	Patrol boat	2	2017	Maritime border and fishery protection, augmenting the Armidale class and replacing MV Mercator. Two Cape-class vessels operating un-commissioned and the other eight commissioned into RAN as of August 2026.
ADV Ocean Protector at HMAS Stirling, December 2022 02	ADV Ocean Protector	Auxiliary	1	2016	Auxiliary vessel, manned and managed by Teekay. Part of the National Support Squadron.
ADV Guidance at Fleet Base East November 2023	ADV Guidance	Auxiliary	1	2023	Auxiliary vessel / undersea support vessel, manned and managed by Teekay. Part of the National Support Squadron.
ADV Reliant at Fleet Base East May 2024	ADV Reliant	Auxiliary	1	2022	Pacific support vessel, manned and managed by Teekay. Part of the National Support Squadron.
	MV Stoker		1	2016	Submarine rescue ship. Carries the LR5 submarine rescue vehicle. Part of the National Support Squadron.
	MV Besant		1	2015	Submarine rescue ship. Part of the National Support Squadron.
	MV Sycamore		1	2017	Aviation training ship. Part of the National Support Squadron.
	MV Mercator		1	1998	Navigation training ship. Part of the National Support Squadron.
STS Young Endeavour	STS Young Endeavour I	Sail training ship	1	1988	Tall ship, operated under the Young Endeavour Youth Scheme.
Blank image 140x96	MV Admiral's Barge	Ceremonial and VIP transport	1	1993	The main Admiral's Barge belonging to the VIP Boat Squadron and based at HMAS Waterhen.
Blank image 140x96	MV Admiral Hudson	Ceremonial and VIP transport	1	1995	A Kingfisher 54 cruiser used as an admiral's barge belonging to the VIP Boat Squadron and based at HMAS Waterhen.

=== Fleet Air Arm ===
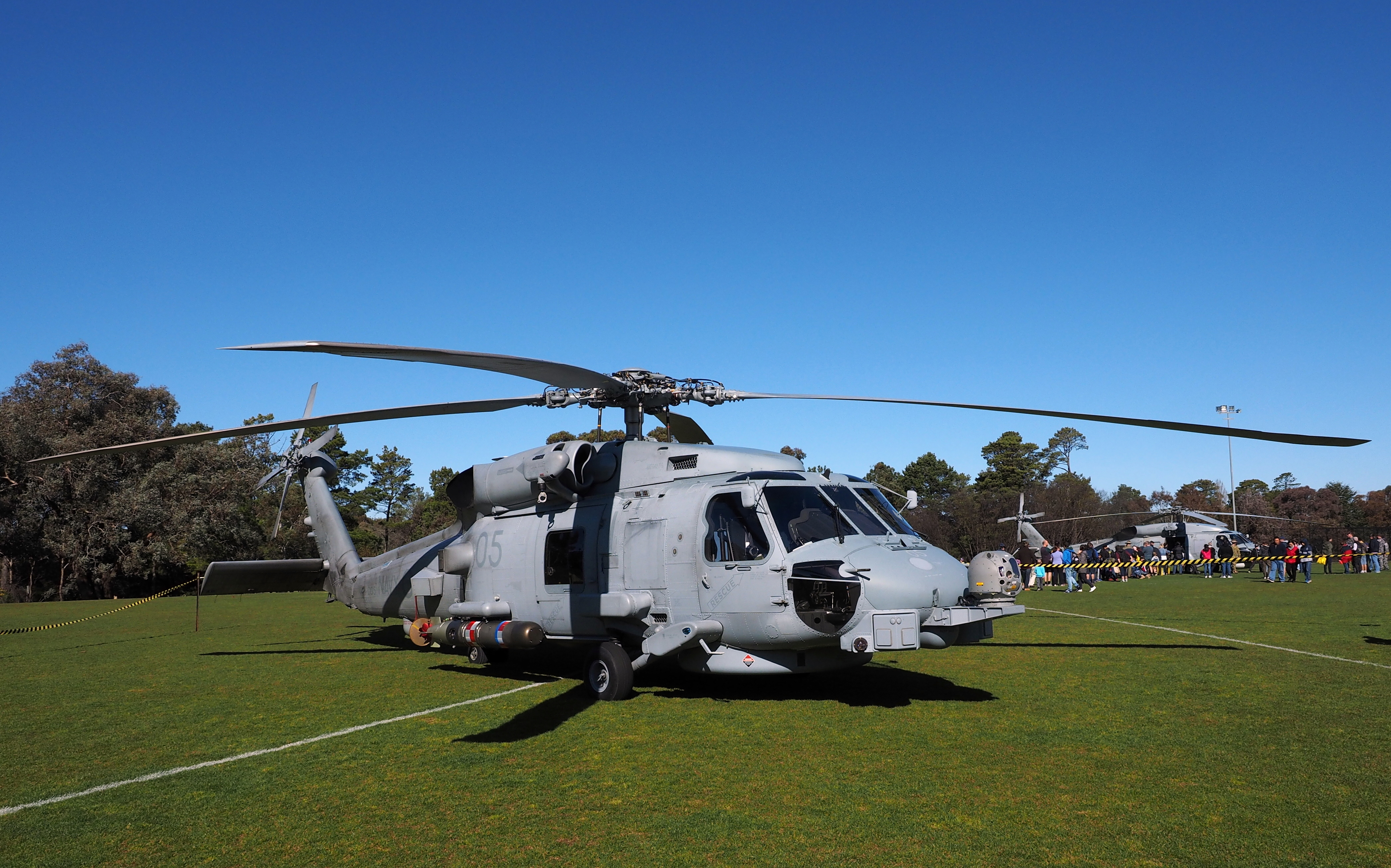
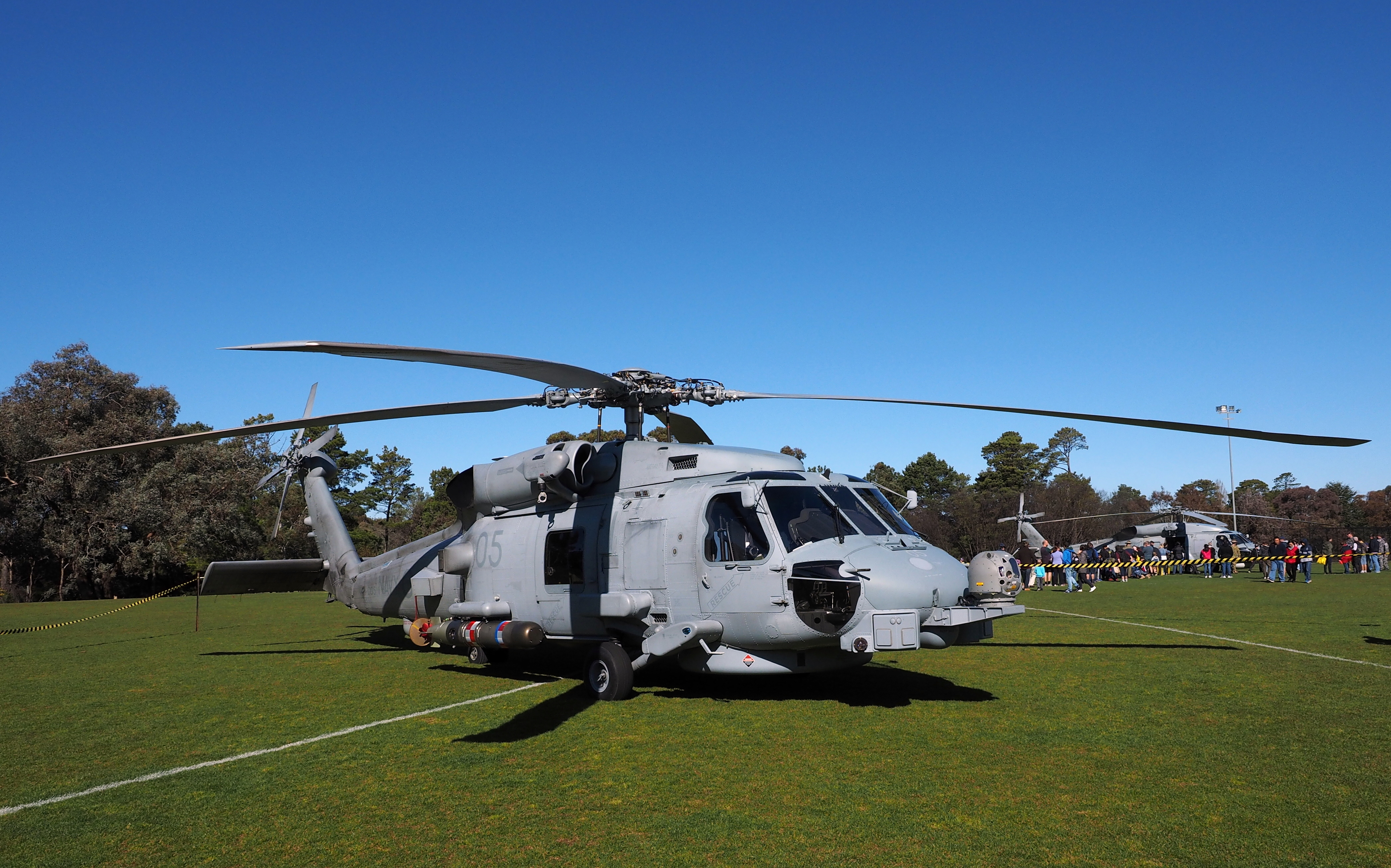
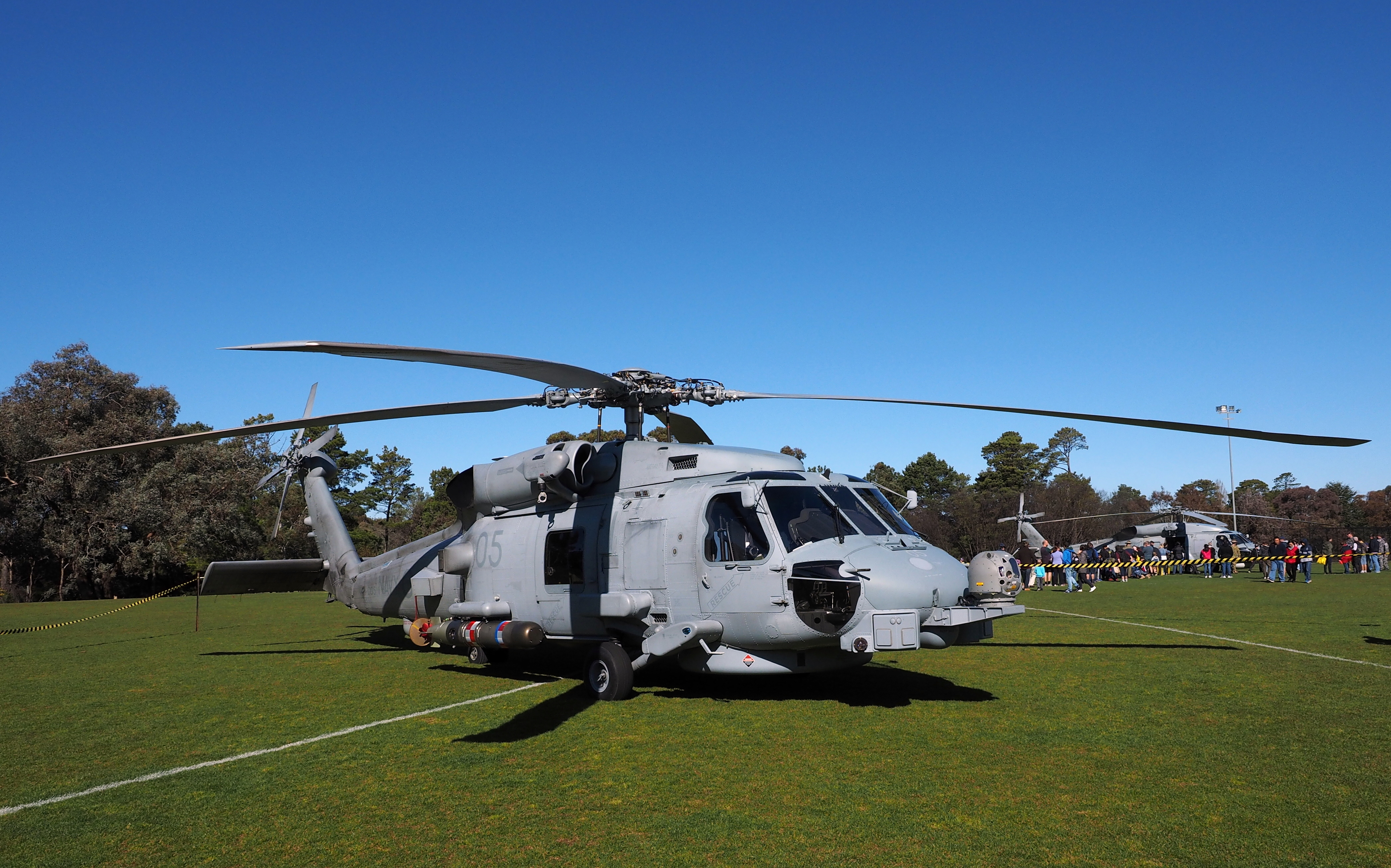
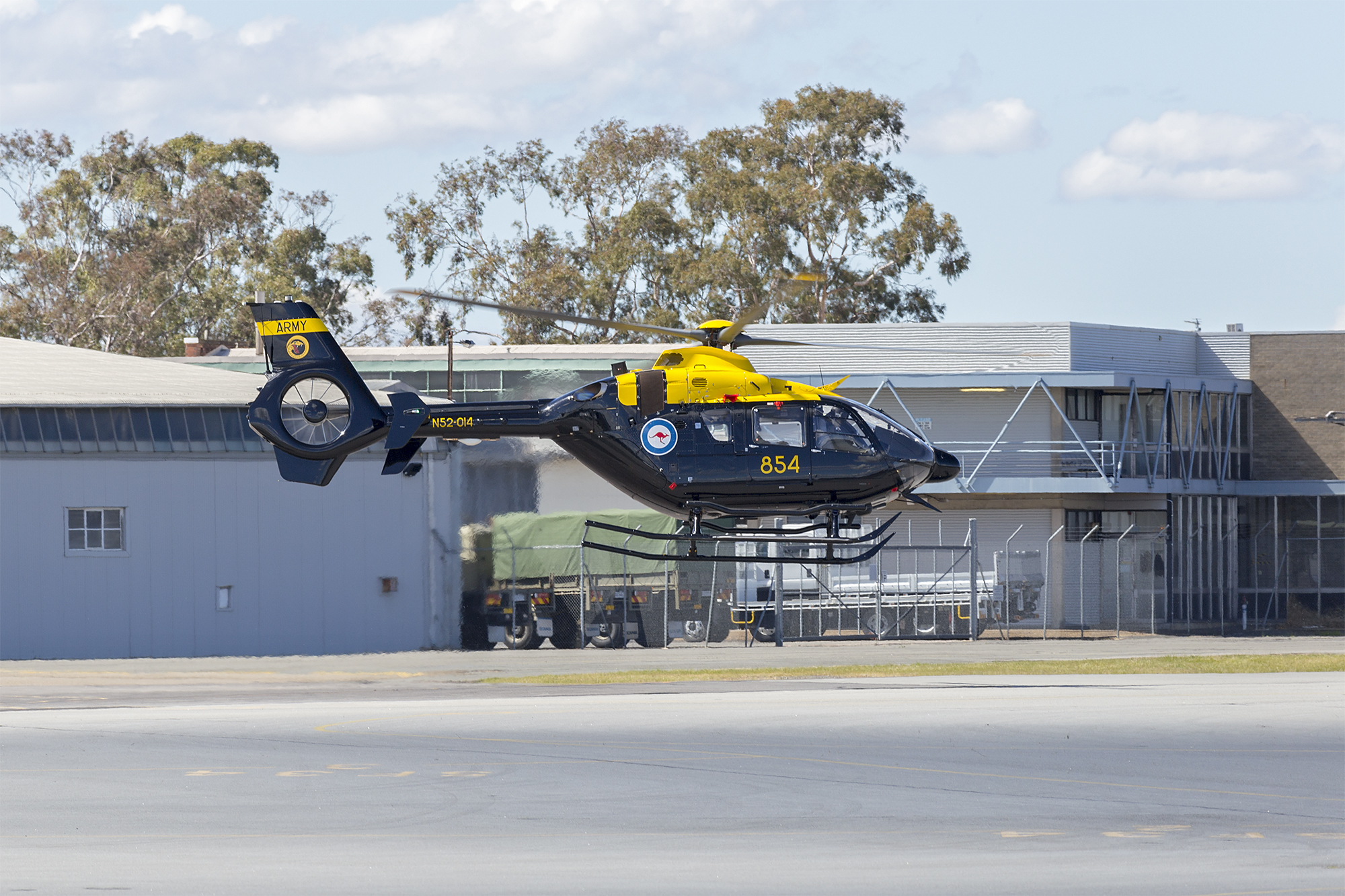
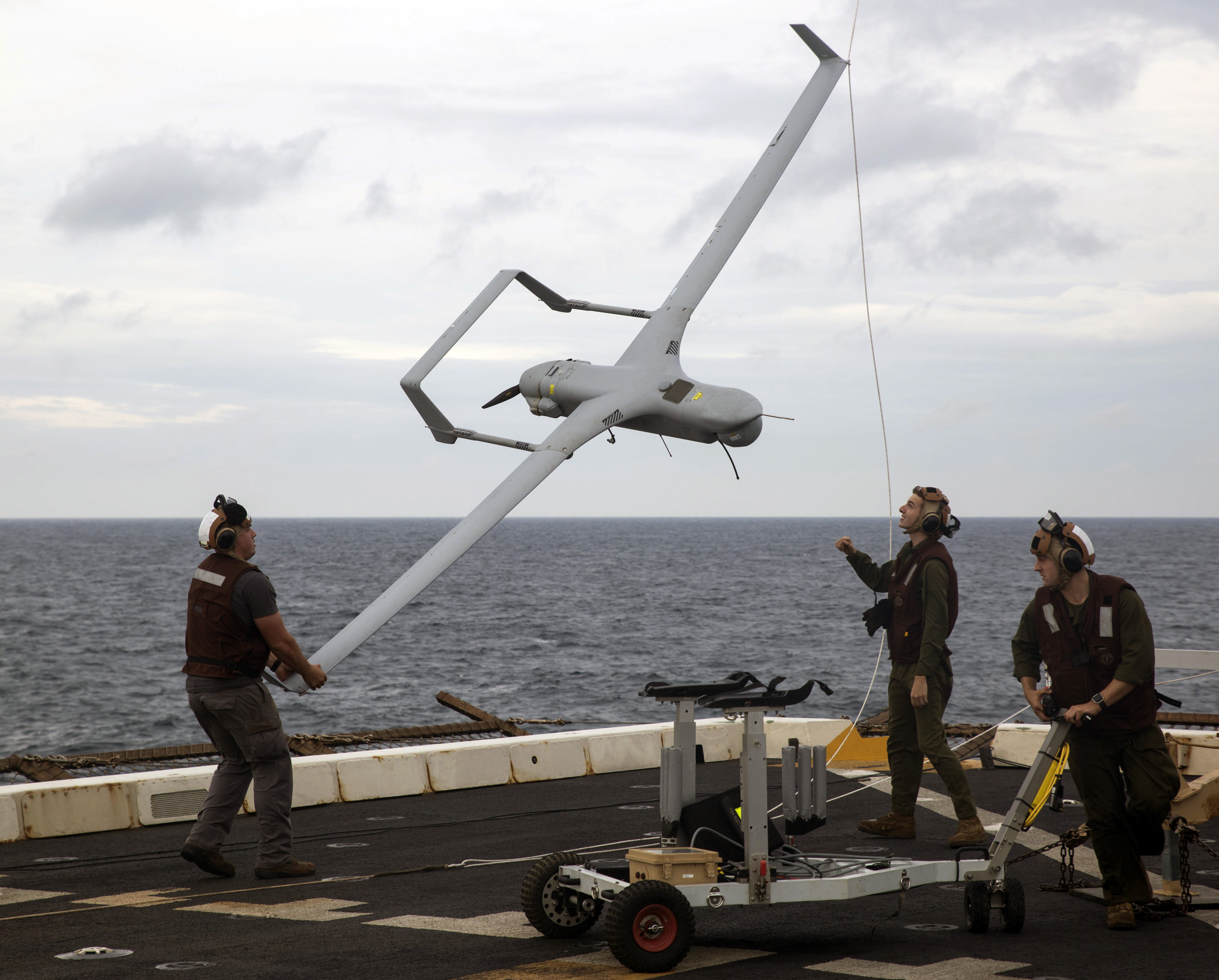
Image	Squadron	Equipment	Number	Role	Details
Operational Squadrons
	816 Squadron	MH-60R	8	Anti-submarine warfare, anti-surface warfare, search and rescue	The RAN operates 23 MH-60Rs, 8 of which are usually deployed at sea at any one time with the rest in maintenance and training. One was ditched in the Philippine Sea in October 2021 while embarked on HMAS Brisbane.
	808 Squadron	MH-60R		Transport and resupply	In April 2022, the RAN ceased flying the MRH-90 Taipan and the fleet was placed into storage. In May 2022, the Australian government announced that the MRH-90 would be replaced by additional MH-60R Seahawks. In September 2022, the government ordered 12 MH-60Rs.
Training Squadrons
	725 Squadron	MH-60R	15	Conversion training and maintenance
	723 Squadron	EC-135T2+	15	Helicopter aircrew training
Experimental Squadron
	822X Squadron	Integrator		Unmanned aerial vehicle trials

=== Small arms ===
RAN personnel utilise the following small arms:

- EF88 Austeyr
- F89A1 Minimi
- Browning Hi-Power
- 870P Shotgun
- M2HB-QCB
- M4A1 carbine
- MAG 58

=== Future ===
There are currently several major projects underway that will see upgrades to RAN capabilities.

- Project SEA 1180 Phase 1 is building six Arafura-class offshore patrol vessels based on the Lürssen OPV80 design, to replace Armidale-class patrol boats. Construction started in November 2018, with the first vessel HMAS Arafura entering service in 2025.
- Project SEA 1905 is the acquisition of a further two Arafura-class offshore patrol vessels in a mine counter-measures configuration.
- Project SEA 1445 Phase 1 is the acquisition of ten Evolved Cape class patrol boats to be built by Austal in Henderson. The RAN decided to acquire the Evolved Cape class boats instead of extending the life of six Armidale class patrol boats as it transitions to the new Arafura class offshore patrol vessel.
- Project SEA 3000 is the General Purpose Frigate program to replace the Anzac-class frigates in the Tier 2 role. It was announced in August 2025 that Japan's Mitsubishi Heavy Industries had won the contract to construct three New FFM ships to enter service between 2029 to 2032. The remaining eight ships are to be built by Austal at Henderson from 2030.
- Project SEA 4000 Phase 6 will upgrade the existing three Hobart-class destroyers with Aegis Baseline 9 combat system.
- Project SEA 5000 Phase 1 is acquiring six Hunter-class frigates based on the British Type 26 Global Combat Ship, to replace the Anzac-class frigates in the Tier 1 ASW role from 2034. The vessels are presently under construction in Adelaide by BAE Systems, with the first three to be named HMA Ships Hunter, Flinders and Tasman.
- Surface Fleet Review announced the acquisition of six Large Optionally-Crewed Surface Vessels (LOSVs) which will be constructed in partnership with the United States Navy.

==== Submarines ====
- Project SEA 1450: In September 2021, Prime Minister Scott Morrison announced that the Collins-class submarines will receive a Life of Type Extension (LOTE) from 2026 that will cost up to A$6.4 billion.
- SSN-AUKUS: In March 2023, Prime Minister Anthony Albanese announced that Australia will build nuclear-powered SSN-AUKUS class submarines. The UK Submersible Ship Nuclear Replacement (SSNR) design was renamed SSN-AUKUS in March 2023, under the AUKUS trilateral security partnership, when Australia joined the project and additional US technology was incorporated into the design. The construction of the first boat is to begin by the end of the 2030s with the boat delivered in the early 2040s. Five boats are planned to be built.
- Virginia class: In March 2023, Prime Minister Anthony Albanese announced that Australia intends to purchase three nuclear-powered Virginia class submarines from the US, subject to congressional approval, to ensure there is no capability gap as the RAN transitions to the SSN-AUKUS. The first boat is planned to be delivered in 2033. If there are delays with the SSN-AUKUS class program, Australia has the option of purchasing up to two additional Virginia class boats.
- East coast base: In March 2022, Prime Minister Scott Morrison announced that a "new submarine base will be built on the east coast of Australia" and "three preferred locations on the east coast have been identified, being Brisbane, Newcastle, and Port Kembla".

==== Autonomous underwater and surface vehicles ====
- Autonomous Underwater Vehicles (AUVs): the long-range Anduril Ghost Shark Extra Large Autonomous Underwater Vehicle (XL-AUV), the jointly developed Cellula Robotics / Trusted Autonomous Systems SeaWolf Extra-Large Unmanned Underwater Vehicle (XLUUV), and the C2 Robotics Speartooth Large Uncrewed Underwater Vehicle (LUUV) are active programs. The RAN is acquiring a fleet of 'dozens' of Ghost Shark XL-AUVs in a A$1.7 billion investment, entering service from early 2026.
- Uncrewed Surface Vessel (USV): the autonomous Bluebottle surveillance platform, designed for conducting long-endurance surveillance missions. The Bluebottle can also act as a communications gateway for underwater vehicles.

== Current operations ==
The RAN currently has forces deployed on seven major operations:

- Operation Resolute: border protection and fisheries patrol.
- Operation Manitou: counter-piracy, counterterrorism and maritime stability in the Middle East and
- Operation Accordion: support operation to provide sustainment to forces deployed on Operation Manitou.
- Operation Solania: contribute to maritime surveillance in the Pacific.
- Operation Gateway: operate maritime patrols in the Indian Ocean and South China Sea, alongside Malaysia.
- Operation Render Safe: safely dispose of remnant explosives of World War II on Pacific nations.
- Operation Dyurra: integrate space capabilities into other operations.

== See also ==
- Australian Navy Cadets
- Australian White Ensign
- Battle and theatre honours of the Royal Australian Navy
- Royal Australian Navy Band
- Royal Australian Navy School of Underwater Medicine
- List of ships of the Royal Australian Navy
- National Support Squadron (Royal Australian Navy)
- Navy News (Australia)
