= Bob McCullough (sports administrator) =

Australian sport administrator

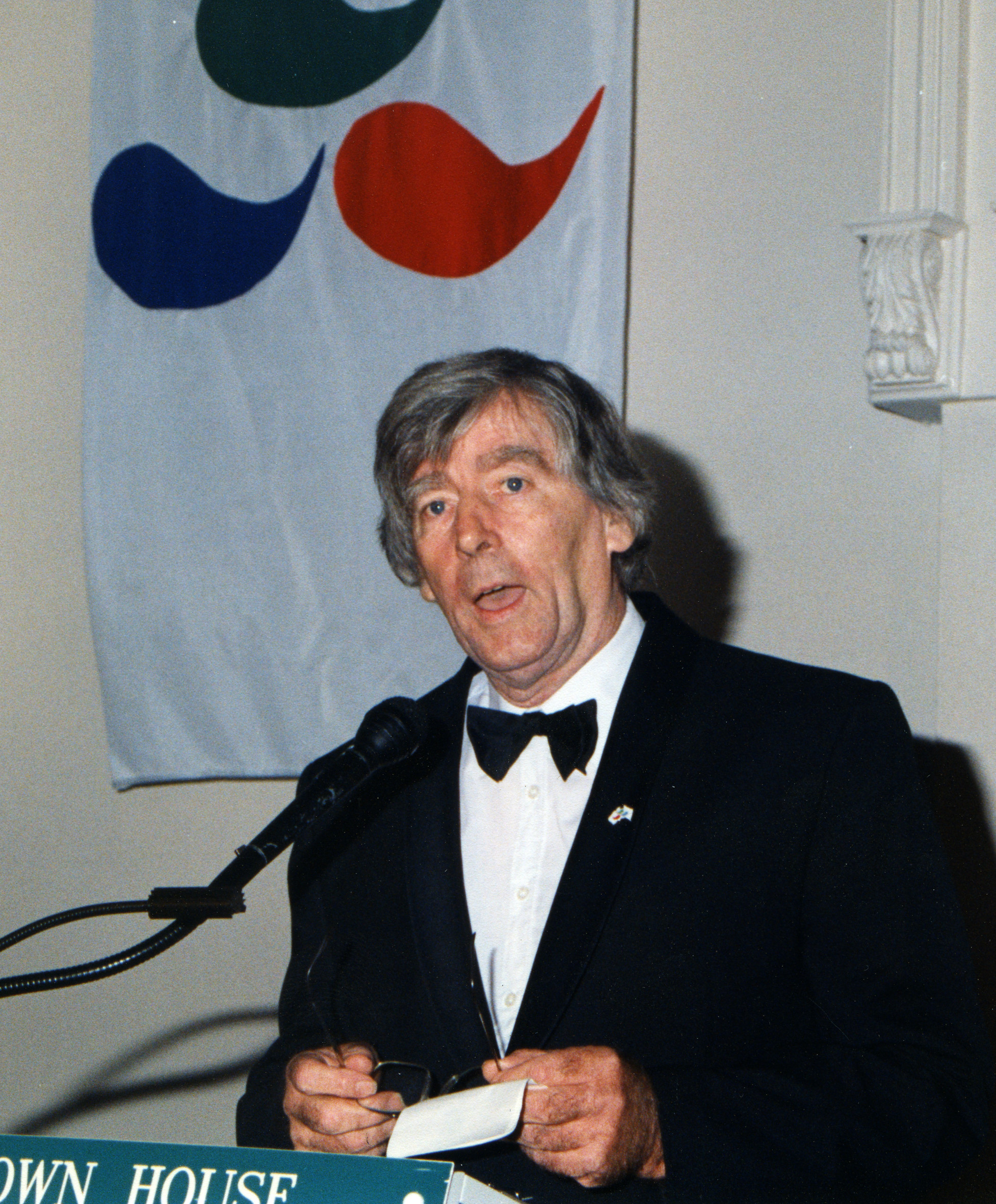
McCullough at the 1994 Australian Paralympian of the Year Awards

Robert McCullough OAM (12 October 1931 – 9 January 2017) was a leading Australian sport administrator particularly in the area of disability sport. He was President of the Australian Paralympic Federation and the International Stoke Mandeville Wheelchair Sports Federation.

== Personal ==
McCullough was born on 12 October 1931. He was an aircraft engineer and worked for the Australian Public Service. He died on 9 January 2017, aged 85.

== Sport administration career ==
In 1983, McCullough was the inaugural Chairperson of the North Queensland Sports Foundation. He held this position until 1986. From 1989 to 1999, he was President of Wheelchair Sports Australia (now Australian Athletes with a Disability). In 1994, he was appointed President of the Australian Paralympic Federation. He took over the Federation at a time when it had limited funds and near bankruptcy. McCullough put in place a marketing and fundraising strategy that aimed to raise $1.5 million for the team to compete at the 1996 Atlanta Paralympic Games. An outcome of this approach was the Motor Accident Authority of New South Wales providing $100,000 and employment for 10 athletes in the promotion of disabilities through motor vehicle accidents. Whilst President, he negotiated an agreement with the Sydney Paralympic Organising Committee so that the Federation received $5.5 million for marketing rights over the four years leading to the 2000 Sydney Paralympics. These financial arrangements coupled with the Australian Governments Paralympic Preparation Program led to the Australian team finishing 2nd on the medal tally at the 1996 Atlanta Games. McCullogh was replaced as President in 1997 by Marie Little. He was a Director of the Sydney Paralympic Organising Committee (1997–2000).

McCullough’s contribution to international sport included his roles as President of the International Stoke Mandeville Wheelchair Sports Federation (1996–2001), International Paralympic Committee Executive (1996–2002), and representative of the Paralympics in the IOC Evaluation Commission for the 2008 Bidding Cities (2001). In 2001, he was unsuccessful in his bid to become President of the International Paralympic Committee.

== Recognition ==
McCullough was recognized for his service to disability sport and regional sport development.

- 1996 – Medal of the Order of Australia (OAM) at the 1996 Queen's Birthday Honours for service to sport through the Australian Paralympic Federation, North Queensland Games Foundation and little athletics.
- 1996 – Sports Administrator of the Year Award by the Confederation of Australian Sport.
- 2000 – Sport Australia Hall of Fame General Member
- 2002 – International Paralympic Committee’s Paralympic Order
- Life Member North Queensland Sports Foundation
