= Jason Hellwig =

Australian sport administrator

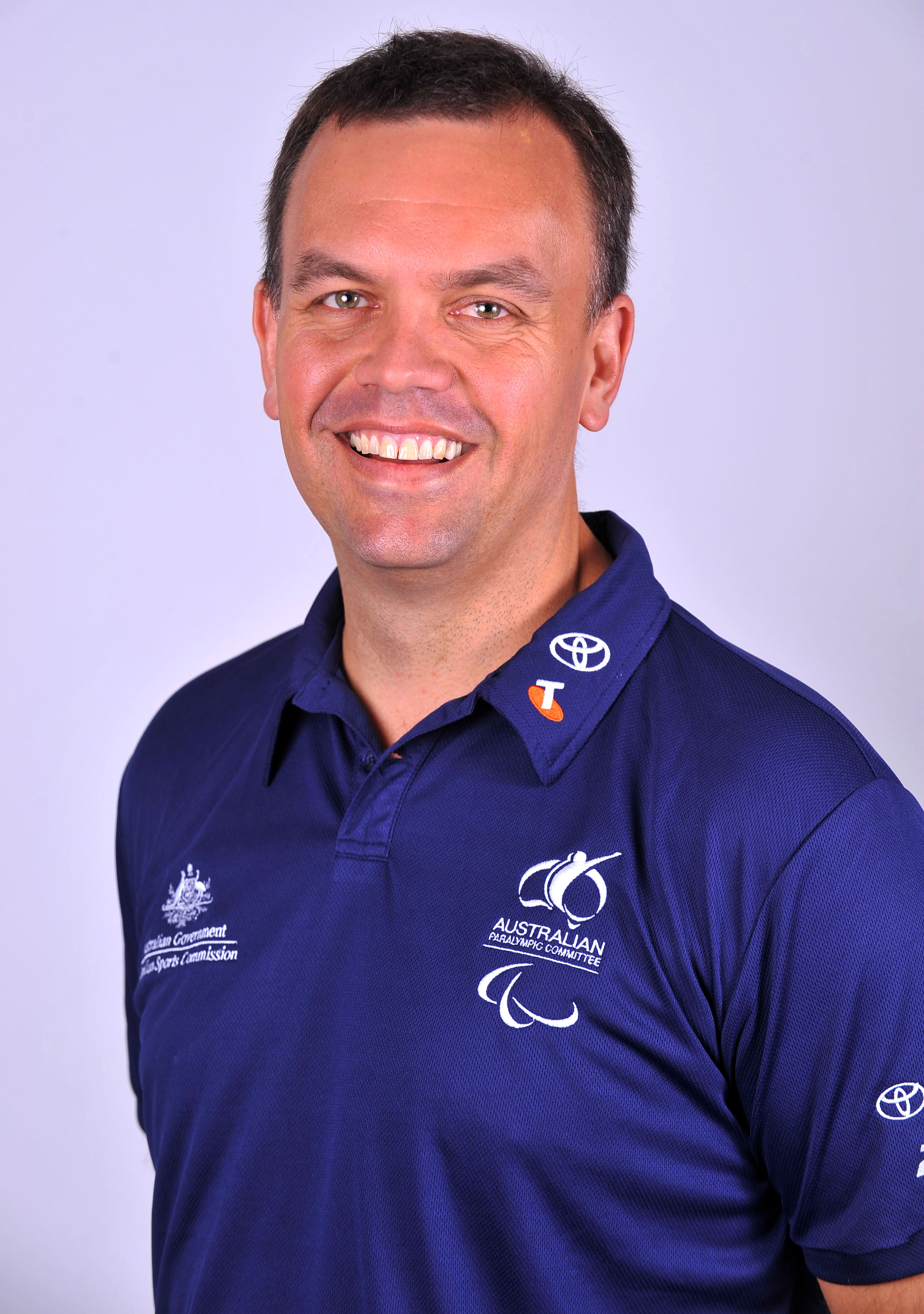
- 2013 Australian Paralympic team portrait of Hellwig
- Born: Darwin, Northern Territory

Jason Scott Hellwig (born 27 September 1971) is an Australian sport administrator. He was the chief executive officer of the Australian Paralympic Committee from 2010 to 2015.

== Early life ==
Hellwig was born on 27 September 1971 in Darwin, Northern Territory. He grew up there and attended Casuarina Secondary College from 1985 to 1988. In 2002, he completed a Master of Business Administration at the University of Ballarat.

== Sport administration ==
Hellwig's full-time sport administration career commenced in 1993 with his appointment as General Manager of Northern Territory Athletics. In 1995, he was appointed Development Officer with Athletics Australia. Other positions held at Athletics Australia included Development Manager and General Manager. Whilst at Athletics Australia he assisted in the improving the awareness and profile of elite athletes with a disability. In particular, Hellwig led the integration Paralympic athletes with able bodied athletes through the increased participation of Paralympic athletes in the Telstra A-series and the full integration of the national championships for athletes with disabilities into the Telstra A-championships.

From 2002 to 2003, he was an Australian Paralympic Committee Board Director. In 2003, he joined the Australian Paralympic Committee as the Director of Sport. This position was responsible for developing high performance sport programs. In January 2010, Hellwig replaced Miles Murphy as Australian Paralympic Committee Chief Executive Officer. . APC President Greg Hartung "Since joining the APC, Jason has managed our sport operations to help ensure Australia has maintained a position within the world’s top five nations at Paralympic Summer Games and top 10 at Paralympic Winter Games. He was appointed Australian Team Chef de Mission for the 2012 Summer Paralympics. The Australian team finished fifth in the medal tally and had its best result since the 2000 Sydney Games winning 31 gold medals and medals in nine sports.

He has attended the following Summer Paralympics as an administrator - 2000 Athletics Manager; 2004 - Director of Operations; 2008 - General Manager; 2012 - Chef de Mission Hellwig stepped down from CEO of the APC in March 2015.

Hellwig was appointed Swimming Victoria Chief Executive Officer in 2016. In this position, he led Swimming Victoria to work with British-based Hawk-Eye Innovations to develop Swimming Video Review Technology system that improves the efficiency and automation of officiating and timing in swimming.

Hellwig in his role of Swimming Victoria CEO commented on the transgender debate in sport with the view that "“As sporting bodies, we have an obligation to represent an opportunity for the entire community to play the sport'.

== Recognition ==
- 2000 − Australian Sports Medal
