= Matthew Cameron =

Australian Paralympic athlete

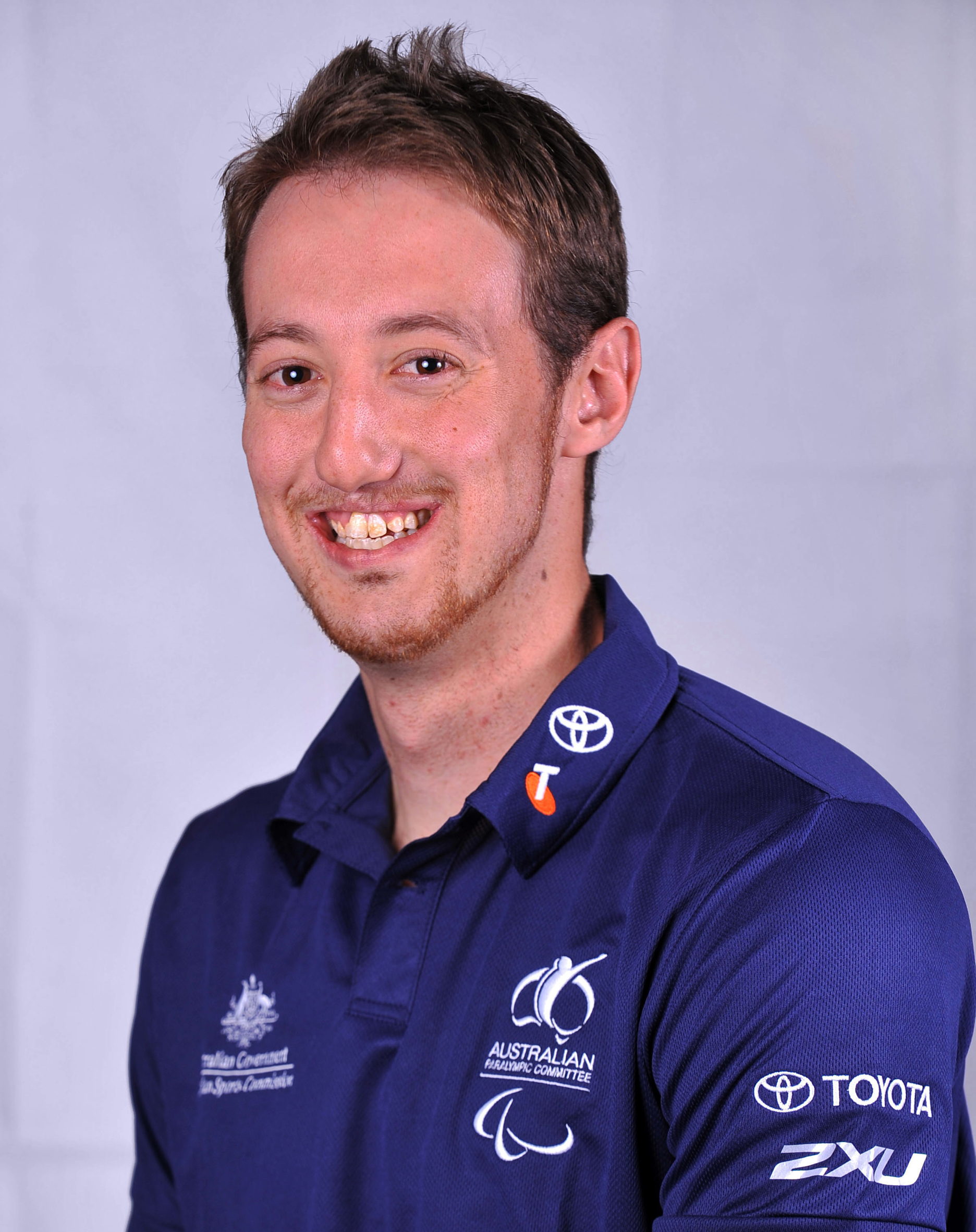
- 2012 Australian Paralympic team portrait of Cameron

Personal information
- Nationality: Australian
- Born: 20 September 1985 (age 41)

Sport
- Country: Australia
- Sport: Paralympic athletics
Medal record
Men's paralympic athletics
Representing Australia
Paralympic Games
Bronze medal – third place	2012 London	4x400 m T53/54

Matthew Cameron (born 20 September 1985) is an Australian Paralympic athletics competitor. He competed at the 2008 Summer Paralympics. At the 2012 Summer Paralympics, he won a bronze medal.

== Personal ==
Cameron was born on 20 September 1985 and is from Wakerley, Queensland. He carried the Paralympic torch during the 2000 Summer Paralympics torch relay. He was named the 2003 Townsville's Australian Sportsperson of the Year. He attended the Barrier Reef Institute of TAFE, where he earned a certificates in business and computer aided drafting. As of 2012, he works as a compliance enforcement officer and lived in Wynnum, Queensland.

Cameron has popliteal web syndrome, a condition he has had since birth. He has had twenty-five surgeries as a result of the syndrome and he cannot stand.

== Wheelchair basketball ==
Cameron has played wheelchair basketball and represented Australia as a member of the Australia men's national under-20 wheelchair basketball team. In 2004, he had a wheelchair basketball scholarship from the North Queensland Sports Foundation.

== Athletics ==
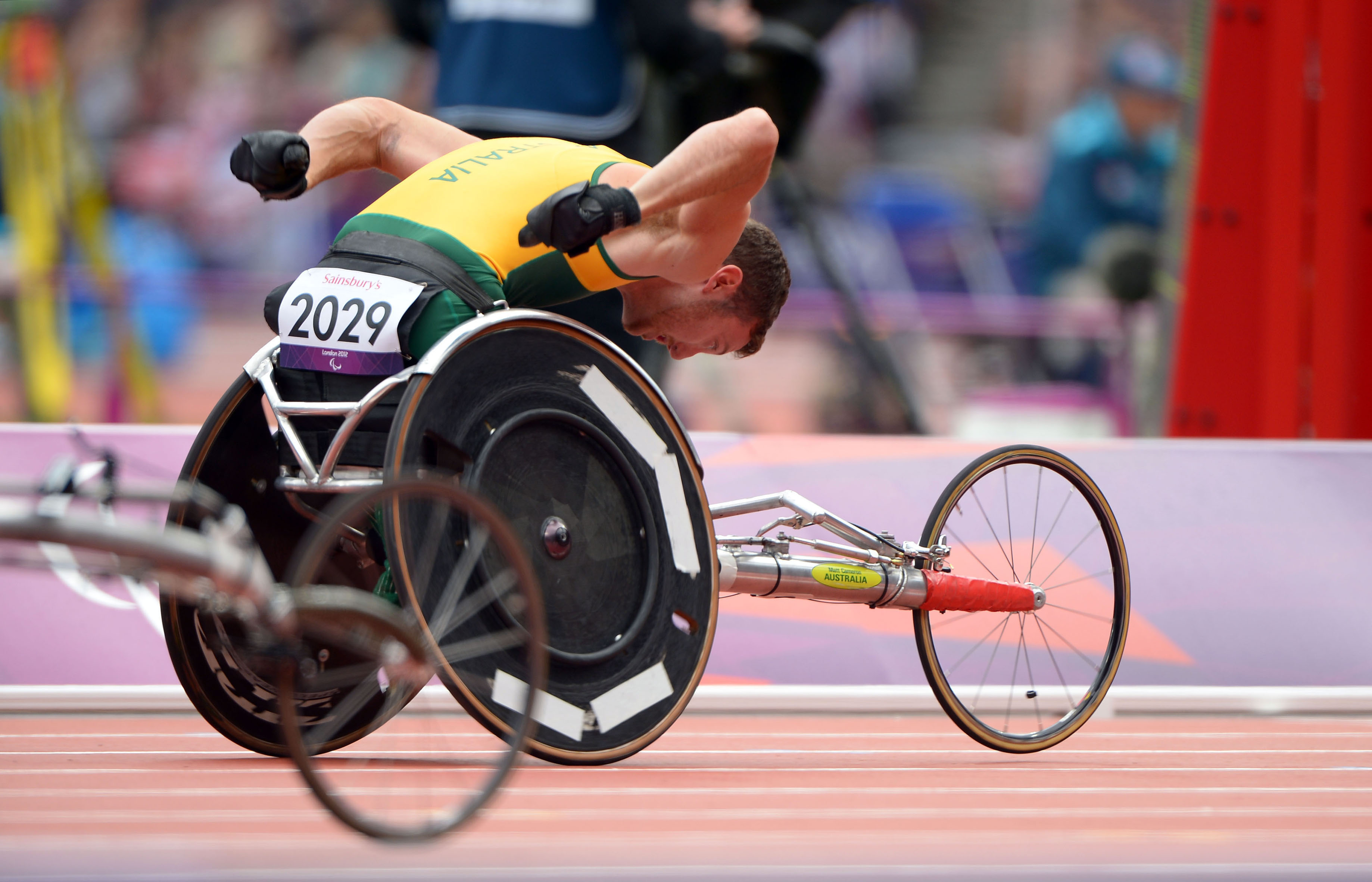
Cameron at the 2012 London Paralympics

Cameron is a T54 competitor, competing in 100 metres, 200 metres, and 400 metres events. He started competing in 2005, and first represented Australia in 2006.

Cameron competed in the 2006 IPC World Championship in the men's T54 100 metres, 200 metres, and 400 metres events. He competed at the 2008 Summer Paralympics in the 100m and 4 x 100-metre relay team events. He missed the finals in the 100m event by one spot. His relay team was disqualified after he fell from his chair during the transition. He competed in the 2011 City2Surf. At the 2011 Australian Athletics Championships, he finished second in the 200-metre wheelchair race final. He finished first in the 100-metre race. He was selected to represent Australia at the 2012 Summer Paralympics in athletics in the 100-metre event.

At the 2012 Summer Paralympics Cameron participated in the Men's 100 m T54 and Men's 4 × 400 m T53/54 events, winning a bronze in the 4 × 400 m.
