= North Queensland Sports Foundation =

Sports & Event Foundation

The North Queensland Sports Foundation (NQSF) is a not-for-profit established in 1983 to develop sporting events and capacity in regional Queensland. The peak body for the community sport industry in the region of North Queensland, their flagship event is the North Queensland Games, the largest regularly run multi-sport event in regional Australia. NQSF also hosts an annual Sports Awards, has an established Sports Hall of Fame for the region, and funds industry and community events through its activity arm Move It NQ.

== History ==
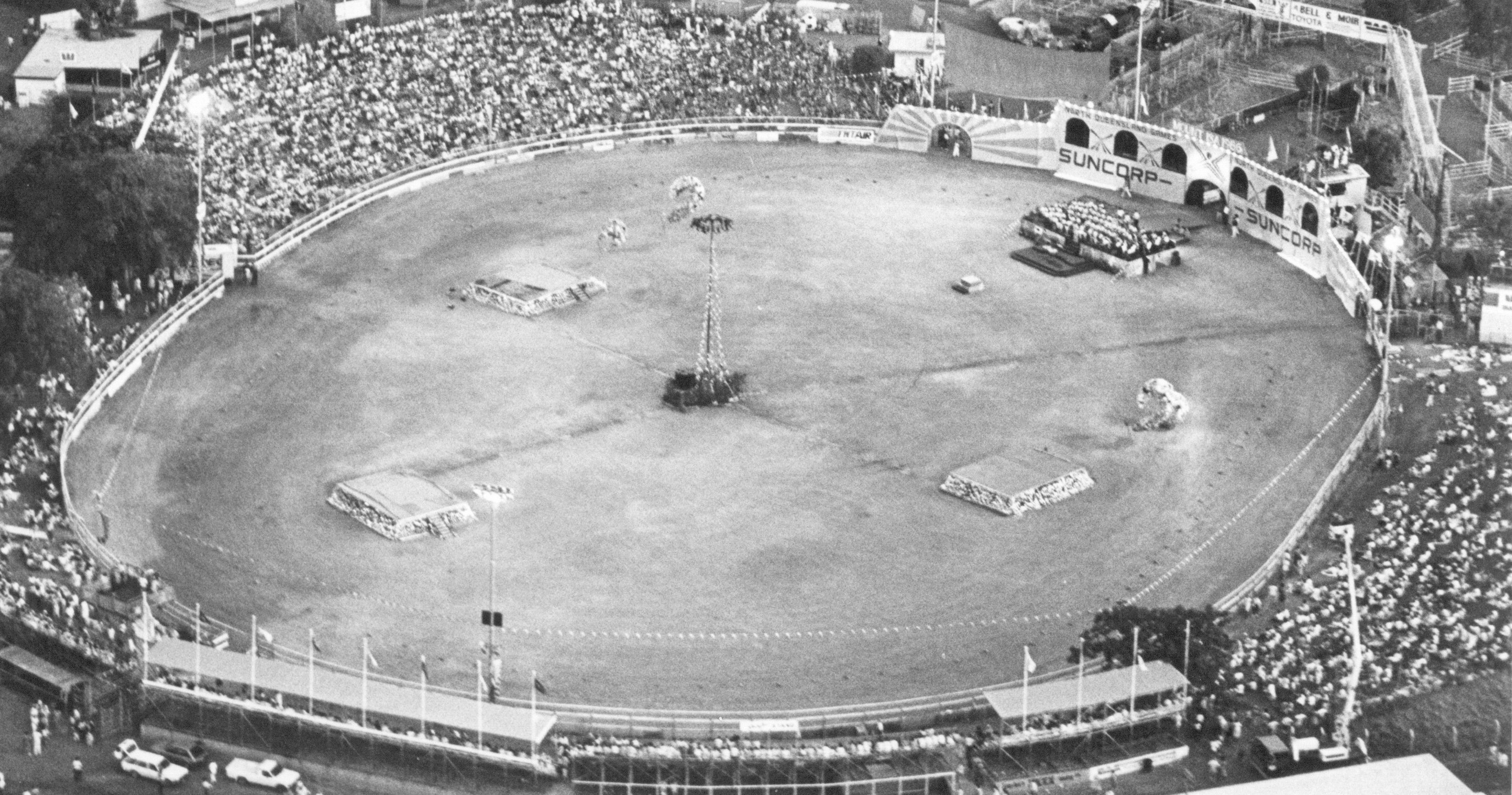
An arial photo of the Opening Ceremony of the 1986 Suncorp NQ Games in Mount Isa

In 1980, the North Queensland International Games was held in front of a capacity crowd at the Townsville Sports Reserve, the first time that track and field athletes had ever been attracted to North Queensland for an event. Subsequently, the media coverage of the 1982 Commonwealth Games in Brisbane further wet the appetite in North Queensland for more sport.

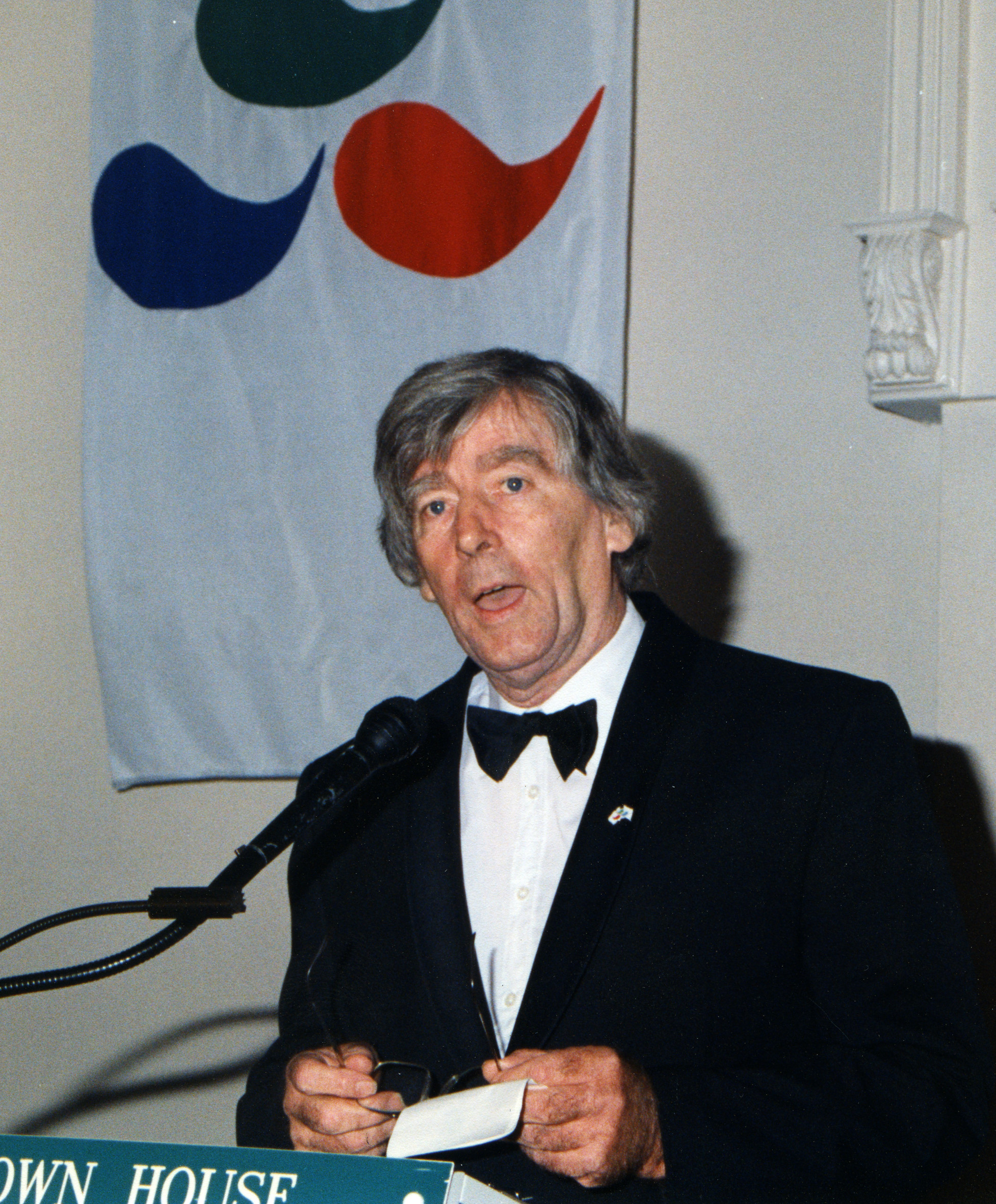
Bob McCullough OAM, an early Chairman of the NQSF, pictured here in 1994

Ken McElligott, the Deputy Mayor of Townsville City Council, convened a public meeting on February 16^{th} 1983 seeking to arrange an overarching body for sports in North Queensland, laying the ground work for what would become the NQSF. In October of 1983 McElligott would be elected to a position in State Parliament and Sports Administrator Bob McCullough OAM would become Chairman of the newly minted North Queensland Games Foundation. Bob would go on to become President of Wheelchair Sports Australia 1986, and then the Australian Paralympic Federation, though he regarded his contribution to the North Queensland Games as his greatest achievement.

== North Queensland Games ==
The NQ Games is a biennial, multi-sport festival hosted in different locations across North Queensland. Rotating through four towns (Townsville, Mount Isa, Mackay and Cairns) and attracting approximately 4,000 athletes, it was originally underpinned by financial contributions from its major sponsor Suncorp for the first 25 years, though it's now run sustainably with sponsorship from the Queensland Government.

After the inaugural event was held in Townsville in 1984, the 1986 edition of the Games was purported to attract over 10,000 spectators from Australia and Papua New Guinea across 62 sports to the regional hub of Mount Isa creating the town's first ever traffic jam.

The Games continued successfully through the 1990's & 2000's, with occasional international competitors. Olympic athletes Brett Aitken, and Gold medalist Natalie Cook were notable entrants in 2000s.

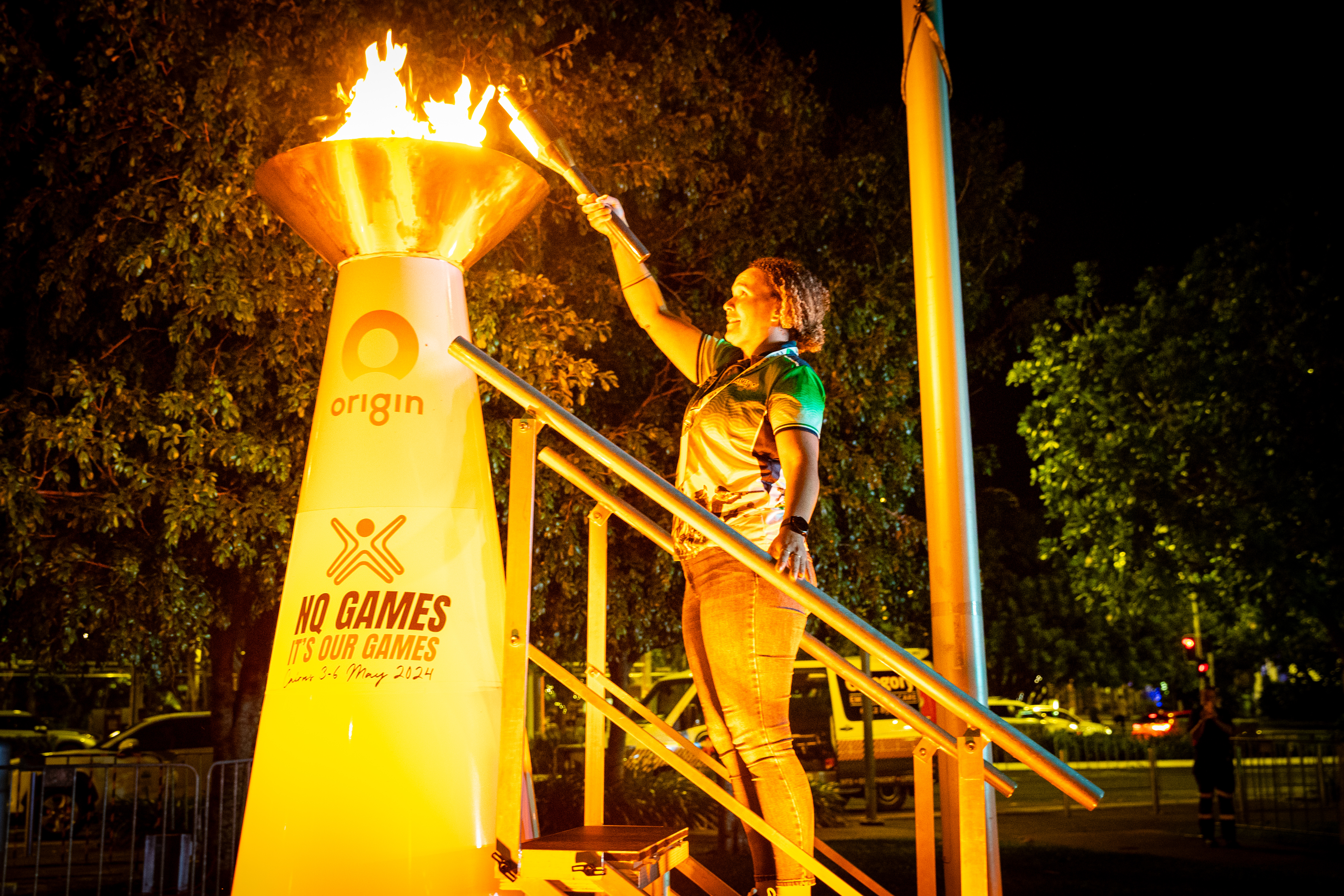
Australian Rugby League representative Libby Cook-Black lights a cauldron during the Opening Ceremony of the 2024 NQ Games in Cairns, Australia.

The 2024 Games returned to Cairns in its 40^{th} anniversary, generating a $3 million dollar boost for the local economy with approximately 12,000 visitors and 2,000 athletes involved in 19 sports including international competitors from Oceanic counties such as Nauru and Papua New Guinea. The NQSF was joined by partners including the Queensland Government, and the Queensland Academy of Sport (QAS) who ran community engagement activities to identify talent in regional Queensland ahead of the Brisbane 2032 Olympics. The 2026 Games were held in Mackay with 25 sports occurring across the region. Natalie Cook returned as an official ambassador, as did local athletes Tori West and Liam Paro.

== Sports Awards ==
First held in 1991, The North Queensland Sportstar Award is the second-longest running dedicated sporting awards in the State of Queensland. The awards recognise the most outstanding junior and senior contributors across 9 categories, from athletes, to coaches, to entire teams.

The 2025 edition of the awards were held in Townsville, with hometown athletes Natalie Cook, Sam Thaiday and Gene Miles celebrated in attendance. Over $40,000 in scholarships was awarded to winners.

=== Notable winners ===
- 1990, 1992–1994 Brad Beven OAM (Triathlete) Senior Award
- 1995 Karrie Webb (Golf) Senior Award
- 1999 Jo Hamilton (World Champion Water-Skier) Senior Award
- 2001 Natarsha Williams (BMX World Champion) Senior Award
- 2006 Tracey Hannah (Mountain Biking) Senior Award
- 2008–2010, 2012 Ashleigh Stebbeings (Multiple World Record Holder, Barefoot Water-Skier) Senior Award
- 2008 Corey Jensen (Athletics, Professional Rugby League) Junior Award
- 2009 Ashleigh Southern (Olympic Medallist, Water Polo) Junior Award
- 2010 Angus MacGregor (World Champion Sailor, Australian Paralympic Soccer Team) Junior Award
- 2011, 2013, 2017 David Nicholas (2x Paralympic Gold Medallist, Cycling) Athlete with a Disability Award
- 2011 Melinda McLeod (BMX World Champion) Senior Award
- 2019 Portia Eden (3x BMX World Champion) Sporting Excellence Award
- 2021 Grant 'Scooter' Patterson (2x Paralympic Medallist, Swimming) Athlete with a Disability Award
- 2023 Jake Doran (100m Sprinter) Senior Award
- 2024 Tori West (Hepthatlete) Senior Award
- 2025 Alexander Ferlazzo (Luge) Senior Award
- 2026 Courtney Woods (Basketball) Senior Award

== NQ Sports Hall of Fame ==
NQSF started elevating local athletes who excelled on the world stage into a Hall of Fame with annual occurrences from 2013. At a standalone event in 2025, NQSF announced plans to embed it's Hall of Fame outside of Queensland Country Bank Stadium in Townsville while inducting its 20th member.
