= Scott Derwin =

Australian sport administrator

Scott Derwin is a leading Australian sport administrator. He was Chief Executive Officer of Surf Life Saving Australia, Australian Paralympic Committee and Basketball Australia. In 2012, he became Chair of Basketball Australia.

== Personal ==
Derwin grew up in Newcastle, New South Wales. Whilst at school he was a competitive swimmer and after school concentrated on surf swimming. He represented Merewether Surf Life Saving Club and in 1966-67 was Australian Senior Surf Race Champion and in 1967-68 was Australian Junior Belt Champion. He became a lawyer and established a legal practice in the Newcastle area in 1978.

== Sport administration career ==
Derwin sold his legal practice in 1992 to become Chief Executive Officer of Surf Life Saving Australia, a position that he held until 1996. Derwin was Chief Executive Officer of the Australian Paralympic Federation for the period 1997 to 1999. During this period, the organisation changed its name to the Australian Paralympic Committee and prepared Australian athletes for the 2000 Sydney Paralympics. Between 1999 and 2008, he was Chief Executive Officer of Basketball Australia. Whilst undertaking this role, Derwin managed the unification of Basketball Australia with National Basketball League and Women's National Basketball League. He then moved to the Sunshine Coast, Queensland in 2009 and has become involved in sport administration in this region. In 2011, he became Chairman of the Sunshine Coast Sports Federation and Chairman of the Bid Committee 2016 Australian Surf Lifesaving Championships, Sunshine Coast. After a period as Chair of Basketball Queensland, he became Chair of Basketball Australia in 2012.

He was President of the Confederation of Australian Sport between 1995 and 2002.

== Recognition ==
- 2000 - Australian Sports Medal
