= Robyn Rowland =

Irish-Australian poet and writer

Robyn Rowland AO
- Born: 1952 (age 73–74); Sydney, New South Wales, Australia

Academic background
- Education: University of Wollongong

Academic work
- Institutions: Deakin University
- Website: https://robynrowland.com/

Robyn Lea Rowland AO (born 1952) is an Irish Australian poet, writer and retired academic.

== Biography ==
Rowland, a third generation Irish Australian, was born in Sydney, New South Wales in 1952. While researching her PhD, Rowland worked as a part-time tutor at the University of Wollongong.

Rowland was appointed Officer of the Order of Australia in the 1996 Queen's Birthday Honours for "service to women's issues, particularly in the fields of higher education and health as Foundation Head of the School of Social Inquiry at Deakin University and Director of the Australian Women's Research Centre".

== Selected works ==
=== Nonfiction ===
- Rowland, Robyn (1984), Women who do and women who don't join the women's movement, London Routledge & Kegan Paul, ISBN 978-0-7102-0296-3
- — (1988), Woman herself: a transdisciplinary perspective on women's identity, Oxford University Press, ISBN 978-0-19-554475-6
- — (1992), Living laboratories: women and reproductive technologies, Indiana University Press, ISBN 978-0-253-20760-9

=== Poetry ===
- Rowland, Robyn (1982), Filigree in blood, Longman Cheshire, ISBN 978-0-582-66525-5
- — (1992), Perverse serenity, Spinifex, ISBN 978-1-875559-13-8
- — (2001), Fiery waters, Five Islands Press, ISBN 978-0-86418-735-2
- — (2004), Shadows at the gate, Five Islands Press, ISBN 978-1-74128-032-6
- — (2006), Silence & its tongues, Five Islands Press, ISBN 978-0-7340-3648-3
- — (2007), This road and other poems, Picaro Press
- — (2010), Seasons of doubt & burning: new & selected poems, Five Islands Press, ISBN 978-0-7340-4160-9
- — (2015), This intimate war: Gallipoli/Çanakkale 1915 = İçlİ Dışlı Bİr Savaş, Gelİbolu/Çanakkale 1915, Çelikel, Mehmet Ali (translator), Five Islands Press, ISBN 978-0-7340-5100-4
- — (2018), Mosaics from the map, Doire Press, ISBN 978-1-907682-62-9
- — (2019), Under this saffron sun = Safran güneşin altinda, Çelikel, Mehmet Ali, (translator), Knocknarone Press, ISBN 978-1-5272-4934-9
