= Greg Hartung =

Australian sport administrator

Greg Hartung AO
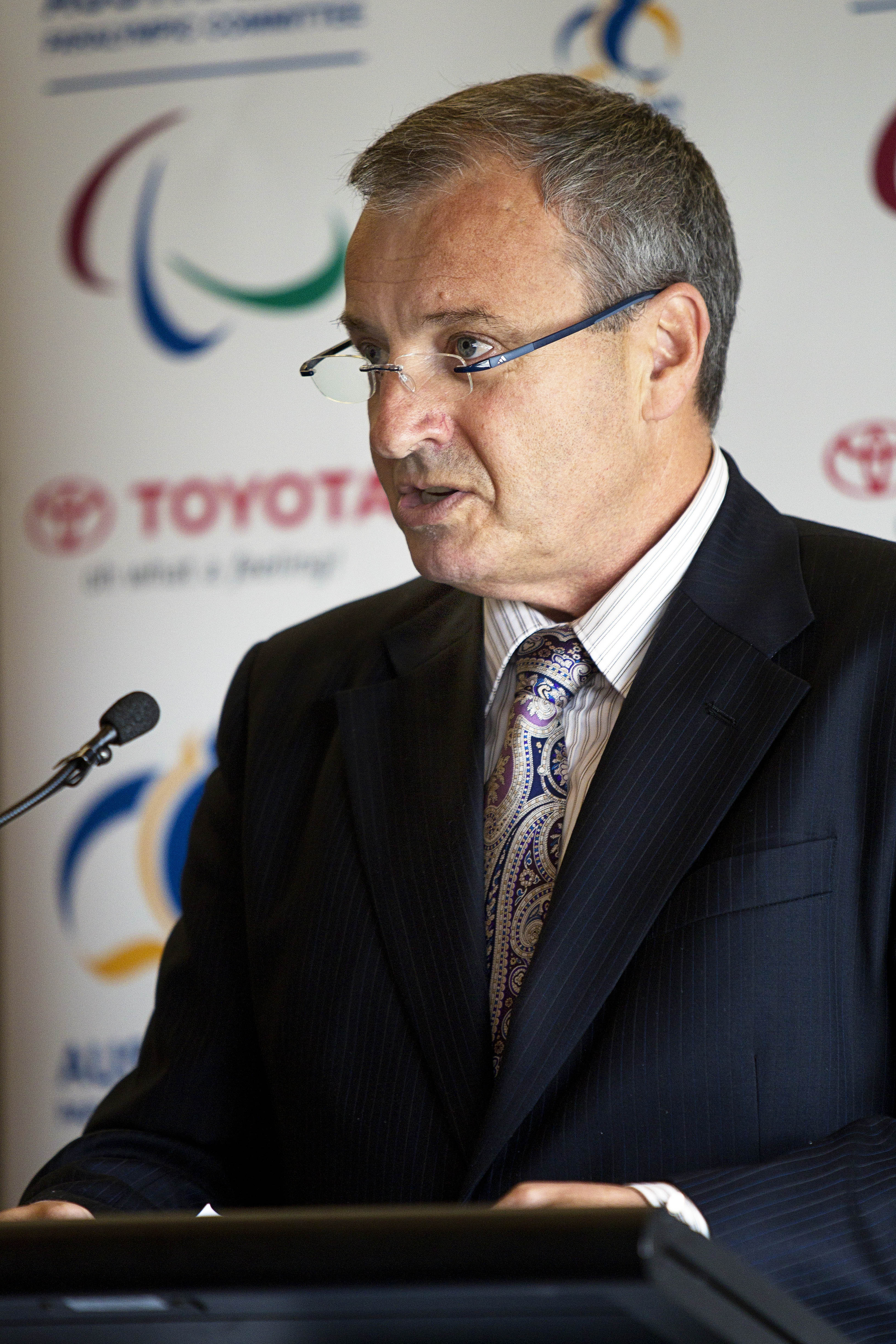
- Hartung in 2011

Vice-President of the International Paralympic Committee
- In office 2009–2013

Chairman of the Australian Sports Commission
- In office 2008–2010
- Preceded by: Peter Bartels
- Succeeded by: Warwick Smith

President of the Australian Paralympic Committee
- In office 1997–2013
- Preceded by: Marie Little
- Succeeded by: Glen Tasker

Chief Executive Officer of the Australian Sports Commission
- In office 1984–1988
- Preceded by: Office established
- Succeeded by: Ronald Harvey

Personal details
- Born: Gregory Neil Hartung; 3 June 1948 (age 78) Maryborough, Queensland, Queensland, Australia
- Education: University of Queensland; University of Sydney
- Occupation: Sports administrator; business executive

Gregory Neil Hartung (born 3 June 1948) is an Australian and international sport administrator. He was President of the Australian Paralympic Committee from 1997 to 2013 and served as vice-president of the International Paralympic Committee 2009–13.

== Personal ==
Hartung was born in Maryborough, Queensland in 1948. His father was a hairdresser and mother was a nurse.

His father died in 1950 from a war related illness and mother died when he was 14. In 1959, Hartung's mother and two siblings had located to Wellers Hill in Brisbane. Hartung attended Mary Immaculate Primary School, Annerley, St James College, Brisbane and St Laurence's College. Hartung was dux of his class in his final year at St Laurence's College and captain of the First XV rugby union team, which were joint premiers. Legacy Australia supported him to complete his schooling.

In 1970, Hartung completed a Bachelor of Arts degree and Diploma of Journalism at the University of Queensland. He has a Master of Arts from the University of Sydney and his thesis examined the impact of lobbying on Australian Government's decision-making process.

His wife Maureen Hartung is executive director of the Blue Gum Community School in Canberra. His son Michael was the general manager of Sport at the Australian Paralympic Committee and was appointed Chef de Mission for the Australian Paralympic Team at the 2010 Winter Paralympics in Vancouver, Canada.

In 2021, he donated his personal collection of papers to the National Library of Australia. His papers covered his life in journalism and sport administration. In 2023, Hartung authored the book "The Great Arm Wrestle: Australian Sport Policy since 1939".

== Journalism career ==
In 1972, Hartung was employed as a cadet at the Courier Mail. In 1973, he joined the Australian in its newly opened Brisbane Office as a graded journalist. He was employed as a sports journalist in Sydney and London. In 1975, he took up a position as a political correspondent for The Australian in Canberra.

== Sport administration career ==
In 1975, he worked as a political journalist in Canberra and during this time, Hartung wrote several newspaper articles highlighting the inadequate support from the federal government for sport and assisted John Brown, Shadow Minister for Sport, to develop the Australian Labor Party's sport policy for the 1983 Federal Election. He wrote a chapter titled Sport and the Canberra Lobby for the book Sport : money, morality and the media. In 2014, he was appointed adjunct professor of sport at the University of Canberra and will be involved in the new Master of High Performance Sport course.

=== Australian Sport Commission ===
Hartung was appointed a member of the Interim Committee of the Australian Sports Commission (ASC) established by Minister for Sport, John Brown in early 1983. In 1984, he was appointed general manager of the Australian Sports Commission, a position which he held until 1988. During his period as general manager, the ASC developed programs in sport participation including Aussie Sport and high performance support for athletes. From 1991 to 1996, he was an Australian Sports Commission Commissioner. In August 2006, he was appointed to the Board of the Australian Sports Commission and in November 2008 was appointed chairman, a position which he held until his resignation on 4 April 2010. He resigned due to increased International Paralympic Committee commitments. Minister for Sport, Kate Ellis paid tribute by stating "Mr Hartung is a leader in national and international sports administration and we're fortunate to have benefitted from his talents over many years. Mr Hartung's dedication to sport, and particular achievement in promoting elite sport for those with a disability, has contributed to a well-run and inclusive sporting environment in Australia". Whilst on the Board, he was Chairman of the Australian Sports Foundation.

=== Confederation of Australian Sport ===
From 1989 to 1995, Hartung was President of the Confederation of Australian Sport, a peak sport body with the objective of providing a united voice in negotiations with government and stakeholders. As President, he argued that all minor sports deserved support due to the Australian Sports Commission's mandate of sport being for all Australians. He was made a life member of the Confederation.

=== Australian Paralympic Committee ===
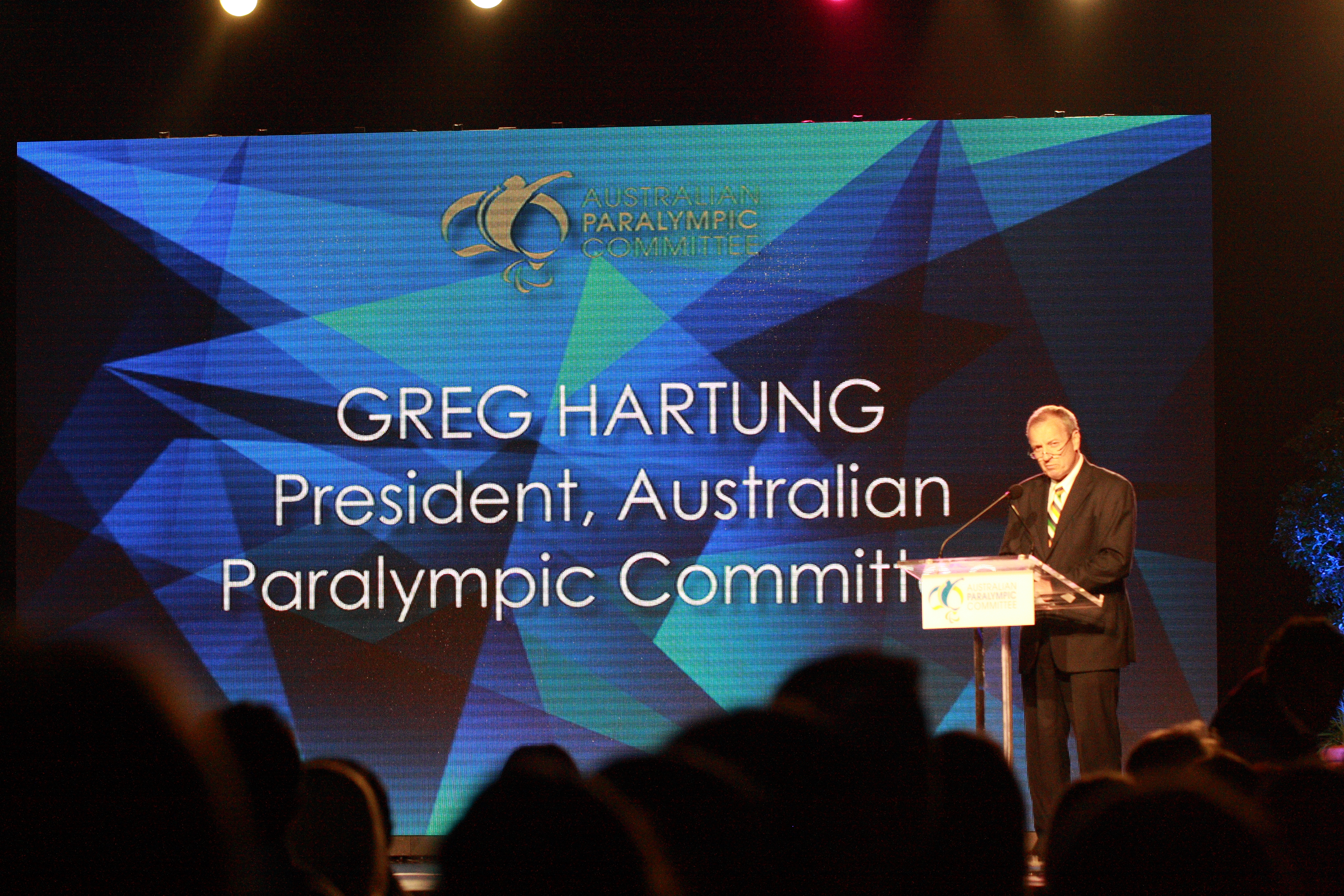
Hartung presiding at the 2012 Australian Paralympian of the Year ceremony

Hartung provided strategic advice to Australian Paralympic Federation in its bid to host the 2000 Summer Paralympics in Sydney. Hartung was President of the Australian Paralympic Committee from 1997 to 2013 Hartung served as the President of the South Pacific Paralympic Committee. He also established the Oceania Paralympic Committee, and served as the Deputy President of the Sydney 2000 Paralympic Games Organizing Committee. Peter Dutton, Minister for Sport made the following comments about Hartung after his resignation as APC President:

Greg has made a significant contribution to the national and international Paralympic movement and has helped to increase support and respect for athletes with a disability. He has overseen the Australian team's preparations for eight successful Paralympic Games. In fact, the Australian team has not finished outside the top five in the medal tally at the Summer Paralympic Games during Greg's tenure, with Australian athletes earning 85 medals at the London 2012 Summer Paralympic Games. Greg helped to introduce world-class national programs in classification and talent identification, and improved the pathways for athletes with higher levels of disability to transition from community sport to the national team.

=== International Paralympic Committee ===
On 23 November 2009, Hartung was elected the vice-president of the International Paralympic Committee Governing Board at a meeting of the IPC General Assembly in Kuala Lumpur. He was the first Australian to become a vice-president of the IPC. He was a member of the International Olympic Committee Co-ordination Commission for the 2016 Olympic and Paralympic Games and a member of the International Olympic Committee Radio and Television Commission. Hartung did not seek re-election in the 2013 IPC Governing Board election.

=== Swimming Australia ===
In October 2020, Hartung was elected to the Swimming Australia Board. He resigned in April 2021.

== Business career ==
Hartung owned the company Access Communications. This company specialised in publishing, political monitoring and databases. Hartung sold Access Communications to CCH in 2000. He currently the Company Director and Principal of GNH Management. He is a graduate of the Australian Institute of Company Directors.

== Recognition ==
- 1996 – Life Member and Fellow of the Confederation of Australian Sport
- 2001 – Centenary Medal
- 2002 – Medal of the Order of Australia (OAM)
- 2008 – Inaugural Life Member of the Oceania Paralympic Committee
- 2013 – Officer of the Order of Australia (AO)
- 2019 - Paralympic Order
- 2024 - Australian Paralympic Hall of Fame
