= Geoffrey Smith (admiral) =

Australian naval admiral

- Born: 16 May 1950 (age 76); Sydney, New South Wales
- Military career
- Allegiance: Australia
- Branch: Royal Australian Navy
- Service years: 1965–2002
- Rank: Rear Admiral
- Commands: Maritime Commander Australia (2000–02); Deputy Chief of Navy (1999–00); Northern Command (1999); HMAS Perth (1995–96)
- Conflicts: Vietnam War
- Awards: Officer of the Order of Australia (2002; revoked in 2015)
- Other work: CEO of Sydney Ferries (2006–09); dismissed for corrupt conduct

Rear Admiral Geoffrey Francis Smith (born 16 May 1950) is a retired officer of the Royal Australian Navy. After retiring from a 37-year naval career, Smith was appointed CEO of Sydney Ferries until his dismissal over allegations of misuse of his corporate credit card. Investigated by the Independent Commission Against Corruption (ICAC) in 2009, Smith was found by the commission to have engaged in corrupt conduct. The case was referred to the Department of Public Prosecutions, and Smith was jailed for up to two years after pleading guilty before the District Court of New South Wales to one charge of cheating or defrauding Sydney Ferries.

== Naval career ==
Smith was born in Sydney in 1950, and entered the Royal Australian Naval College in 1968. From January 1995 to July 1996, he was the commanding officer of the guided missile destroyer HMAS Perth.

In 1996, he became Director-General of Naval Policy and Warfare, and in 1997, Commandant of the ADF Warfare Centre at RAAF Base Williamtown. In 1999, he was Commander of Northern Command, and later that year became Deputy Chief of Navy. From July 2000 to July 2002, Smith served as Maritime Commander Australia. Smith retired from the navy in 2002, with the rank of rear admiral.

== Sydney Ferries ==
After leaving the navy, Smith worked as a consultant for Nautilus Underwater Systems, and then worked for Australian Defence Industries (ADI). After nine months at ADI, his corporate American Express credit card was cancelled after he incurred a $28,000 debt.

On 21 August 2006, Smith was appointed as chief executive officer of Sydney Ferries. Between September 2006 and March 2009, Smith charged over $237,000 of personal expenses to his corporate credit card. Despite an annual salary of $320,000, Smith found himself in financial difficulties, with a substantial mortgage on a home in Northern Sydney and medical expenses following his wife's illness and hospitalisation. Between December 2006 and June 2008, Smith reimbursed Sydney Ferries $135,598 for personal expenditure but made no further reimbursements, leaving an outstanding debt of $102,000. Furthermore, in October 2008 Smith had signed a letter to the Minister for Transport, David Campbell, assuring the minister that corporate card use within the organisation was in full compliance with government policy that cards only be used for official business.

On 18 March 2009, Smith's conduct came to the attention of John Lee, Director-General of the Department of Premier & Cabinet, who stood him aside immediately. On 27 May, Minister Campbell announced that Smith's employment had been terminated. The case was referred for investigation to the Independent Commission Against Corruption (ICAC), which made findings of corrupt conduct by Smith and referred him to the Department of Public Prosecutions.

From February 2011, Smith worked as a casual employee at Bunnings in Chatswood, whilst waiting for his case to be heard. In July 2011, he filed for bankruptcy, at that stage owing over $410,000 to banks, landlords and phone companies.

In August 2014, Smith pleaded guilty to one charge of cheating or defrauding Sydney Ferries. Prior to sentencing, District Court judge Michael Finnane cited Smith's "exemplary good character" in his naval career, saying it was "a tragedy that such a distinguished man should find himself facing sentence for fraud offences". He was sentenced to a minimum of eighteen months and a maximum of two years in prison.

== Honours ==
- In the 1996 Queen's Birthday Honours, Smith was made a Member of the Order of Australia (AM) in the military division for exceptional service to the Australian Defence Force, particularly as commanding officer of HMAS Perth.
- In the 2002 Australia Day Honours, Smith was upgraded to Officer of the Order of Australia (AO).
- On 27 March 2015, Governor-General Peter Cosgrove (on behalf of the Queen) terminated Smith's appointment to the Order of Australia.

Military offices
Preceded by Rear Admiral Chris Ritchie	Deputy Chief of Navy; 1999–2000	Succeeded by Rear Admiral Brian Adams
Preceded by Rear Admiral John Lord	Maritime Commander Australia; 2000–2002	Succeeded by Rear Admiral Raydon Gates
Business positions
Preceded by Suzanne Sinclair	CEO of Sydney Ferries; 2006–2009	Succeeded by David Callahan
