= Marie Little =

Australian sport administrator

Marie Therese Little OAM (1 January 1933 – 17 August 2014) was a leading Australian sport administrator particularly in the area of disability sport. She was President of the Australian Paralympic Federation and AUSRAPID.

== Personal ==
Little (née Mogford) was born on 1 January 1933. Little grew up in Hamilton, Victoria and attended Mount St Michael's College and Hamilton High School, Victoria. Between 1968 and 1971, she undertook a social work degree at the University of Adelaide. She has four children and separated from her husband after 15 years. After a short illness, Little died peacefully after a short battle with cancer on 17 August 2014 at Mary Potter Hospice in Adelaide, South Australia.

== Sport administration career ==
In the 1960s, Little presented a women's sport radion program for 3HA Hamilton. She was President of the Hamilton Amateur Basketball Association. In 1982, she was elected the inaugural President of SASRAPID (South Australian Sport and Recreation Association for People with Integration Difficulties Incorporated). In 1986, she founded AUSRAPID and started argue the case with state and national sports organisations to include people with an intellectual disability in mainstream sport. She was President of AUSRAPID from 1986 to 2011. In 1992, she was Chef de Mission of the Australian Team at the Madrid Games for intellectual disability athletes which was held immediately after the Barcelona Paralympics. On her retirement from AUSRAPID in 2011, Little noted that her involvement can be traced back to innocent question from a young lady with a disability - Why can’t I play Netball? Incoming AUSRAPID President Wayne Bird stated the passion and energy she has had for the organisation, and more so for the athletes who benefit has been unbelievable. Marie can be very proud of her achievements and assured that her legacy will benefit many people for years to come.

Little was one of the founding directors of the Australian Paralympic Federation (APF) in 1990. She was president from 1996 to 1997. During her term as president, the APF professionalised its administration with the goal of having a successful 2000 Sydney Paralympics. Little was a member of the bid committee for the Sydney 2000 Paralympic Games from 1991 to 1993. After Sydney won the right to host the 2000 Summer Paralympics, Little was a member of the Sydney Paralympic Organising Committee (1993–1998), including a period as vice-president from 1994 until 1998.

Little was the first female Member of the International Paralympic Committee's Executive Board, from 1993 to 1997. Little was for many years on the executive board of INAS-FID, the international organisation for athletes with an intellectual impairment.

After the 2000 Sydney Paralympic Games, athletes with an intellectual disability were suspended from the Paralympic Games following the cheating by the Spanish Paralympic Basketball Team at the Games. Little has led the fight for the re-inclusion of athletes with an intellectual disability into the Paralympic Games.

After her death, there were several tributes to her contribution to athletes with a disability. Glenn Tasker, Australian Paralympic President, stated After first advocating for inclusion of people with an intellectual impairment into community sport in the 1970s, Marie became a shining example of how an individual with passion, humility, drive and commitment can make a difference. Greg Hartung, Australian Paralympic President from 1997 to 2013, stated High on the list of Marie’s personal traits were integrity and courage. She may not have been text book in her approach, but she knew instinctively what leadership demanded. This was evident in the way she championed the interests of athletes with an intellectual disability, in Australia and internationally. It was about serving, not ruling!

== Recognition ==
She has been recognised for her service to disability sport.

- 1993 - Equal Opportunity Achievement Award
- 1994 - 100 Years Women's Suffrage Award
- 2002 – Australian Paralympic Medal
- 2000 - Australian Sports Medal
- 2001 – Centenary Medal
- 2006 - Order of Australia (OAM) gor service to people with disabilities through activities supporting participation in competitive sporting events.
- 2013 - Netball Australia recognised Little's contribution with The Marie Little OAM Shield. This annual competition provides an opportunity for netballers with an intellectual disability to compete at a national tournament.
- 2017 - International Sports Federation for Persons with Intellectual Disability (INAS) Hall of Fame for services to ID sport
