= 1996 Queen's Birthday Honours (Australia) =

The 1996 Queen's Birthday Honours for Australia were announced on Monday 10 June 1996 by the office of the Governor-General.

The Birthday Honours were appointments by some of the 16 Commonwealth realms of Queen Elizabeth II to various orders and honours to reward and highlight good works by citizens of those countries. The Birthday Honours are awarded as part of the Queen's Official Birthday celebrations during the month of June.

== Order of Australia ==
=== Companion (AC) ===
==== General Division ====
Recipient	Citation	Notes
His Excellency Major General Philip Michael Jeffery, AO MC	For service to the Crown as Governor of Western Australia and to the community, particularly through providing leadership in his commitment to the initiation and promotion of youth programmes to address contemporary social problems.	
John Archibald Landels, AO	For service to Australian industry through the development of a competitive national electricity market as Chairman of the National Grid Management Council.	
John Barry Prescott	For service to the manufacturing and mining industries as Managing Director of Broken Hill Proprietary Company Limited and as an active contributor to various industry councils.	
Professor Fiona Juliet Stanley	For service to maternal and child health research, particularly in peri-natal and infant problems, and for her contributions to improving aboriginal and community health.	

=== Officer (AO) ===
==== General Division ====
Recipient	Citation	Notes
The Honourable Justice Alan James Barblett, RFD AE	For service to the law, particularly as Deputy Chief Justice of the Family Court of Australia and former Chairman of the National Legal Aid Advisory Committee.	
Professor Ruth Frances Bishop	For service to medical research, particularly for her contributions to the understanding of gastroenteritis in children.	
Elizabeth Ann Churcher, AM	For service to art and to the community as Director of the Australian National Gallery.	
Christopher Conybeare	For service to immigration and the development of asylum seeker review processes.	
Michael John Costello	For service to international relations, particularly in relation to the Cambodian peace settlement and the Chemical Warfare Convention.	
Laurence Grimes Cox	For service to business and commerce, particularly as Chairman of the Australian Stock Exchange.	
Emeritus Professor Sidney Charles Bartholomew Gascoigne	For service to observational astronomy, specialising in the life history of stars, particularly in the Magellanic Clouds and for his contribution to astronomical optics and to the Anglo-Australian Telescope.	
Professor Robert George Gregory	For service to economic research as Head of the Division of Politics and Economics at the Research School of Social Sciences and for his contributions to public economic policy.	
William Patrick Gurry	For service to the finance and banking profession, to the arts, and to the community through the Baker Institute for Medical Research and the Financial Markets Foundation for Children.	
Frank Charles Beresford Haly, AM	For service to business and finance through the Queensland Regional Liaison Group of the Australian Securities Commission.	
Dr John Foxton Ross Kerr	For service to medicine, particularly for his research into pathology, cell death and apoptosis and as Professor of Pathology at the University of Queensland for 20 years.	
Professor Louis Isaac Landau	For service to research into paediatric respiratory medicine and as Professor of Paediatrics at the University of Western Australia and Chairman of the Western Australian Research Institute for Child Health.	
Professor Douglas Ian McCloskey	For service to neuroscience particularly as Director of the Prince of Wales Medical Research Institute specialising in the functions and disorders of the brain and nervous system.	
Professor Thomas John Martin	For service to medical research particularly in the field of endocrinology and as Director of St Vincents Institute of Medical Research and Professor of Medicine at the University of Melbourne.	
Dr George Miller	For service to the Australian film industry as a director, producer and writer, as Founding Board Director of the Museum of Contemporary Art and as a member of the international jury of the Cannes Film Festival.	
Glenn Marcus Murcutt	For service to architecture as a designer of residential, commercial and public buildings inspired by the Australian landscape and Aboriginal culture.	
Emeritus Professor Donald James Nicklin	For service to chemical engineering research and education, particularly as Pro Vice-Chancellor of Physical Sciences and Engineering at the University of Queensland.	
Dr Albert Delfin Rovira	For service to agriculture and soil science through research into soil organisms and as Foundation Director of the Co-operative Research Centre for Soil and Land Management.	
Dr Robyn Lea Rowland	For service to women's issues, particularly in the fields of higher education and health as Foundation Head of the School of Social Inquiry at Deakin University and Director of the Australian Women's Research Centre.	
Jocelynne Annette Scutt	For service to feminist jurisprudence and issues affecting women, including the establishment of a publishing company encouraging female contributions.	
Professor John Shine	For service to medical research, particularly in the field of molecular biology and as Executive Director of the Garvan Institute of Medical Research.	
Mary Vallentine	For service to arts administration particularly as the General Manager of the Sydney Symphony Orchestra for the past 10 years and through Musica Viva Australia.	
The Honourable Peter Alexander Walsh	For service to the Parliament of Australia, particularly as Minister for Finance, and to journalism.	
Dr John William Zillman	For service to meteorology and oceanography, particularly as Director of the Australian Bureau of Meteorology, and President of the World Meteorological Organisation.	

==== Military Division ====
Branch	Recipient	Citation	Notes
Army	Major General William James Crews	For service to the Army as Assistant Chief of the General Staff – Materiel.	

=== Member (AM) ===
==== General Division ====
Recipient	Citation	Notes
Percy Allan	For services to the NSW public sector as Secretary of the NSW Treasury and in the implementation of reforms in public sector financial management.	
Lynnette Allen-Brown	For service to nursing, particularly through St Lukes Hospital and St John Ambulance of Australia.	
Dr John Harris Anker	For service to dentistry, particularly as an oral and maxillofacial surgeon with the Wollongong Hospital and the Port Kembla District Hospital.	
Ross Kingsley Bailey	For service to the primary industry through the GRAINCO Queensland and Co-operative Association, the Australian Grain Marketing Federation and the Bulk Handling Authorities of Australia.	
The Hon Peter Frederick Brinsden	For service to law as a Judge of the Supreme Court of Western Australia and as President of the Australian Law Council and the Law Society of Western Australia.	
Dr Alan Theo Brissenden	For service to the arts as a promoter and critic of drama and dance and as a member of the Board of Governors of the Adelaide Festival.	
Emeritus Professor Roderick Samuel Fisher Campbell	For service to primary industry as an international veterinary consultant and as Founding Professor of the Graduate School of Tropical Veterinary Science, James Cook University, Queensland.	
Dr Jack Richard Cannon	For service to science and technology in the field of chemical research and education and in the promotion of international co-operation among chemists in Australia and South East Asia.	
Councillor Roger George Chalk	For services to local government through the Local Government Association of Tasmania and the Wynyard and the Wynyard/Waratah Councils.	
Stewart George Chapple	For service to the community, particularly people with intellectual disabilities as a Foundation Member and State President of the Tasmanian Council of Intellectual Disability and as Chairman of the Rocherlea Training Centre for the Intellectually Disabled.	
Bishop Neville James Chynoweth, ED	For service to the community through the Anglican Church, particularly the Anglican Diocese of Canberra and Goulburn and the development of church music.	
Mavis Thorpe Clark	For service to the arts as the author of children's literature and as an active member of the writer's organisations in Australia.	
Dr Harold George Cogger	For service to the science of herpetology as the Deputy Director of the Australian Museum and as author of several standard works on herpetology including Reptiles and Amphibians of Australia.	
David Neil Constable	For service to the arts in the field of music as Chairman of the Australian Chamber Orchestra and as a Benefactor Patron of The Australian Opera and the Australian Ensemble.	
Sydney Douglas Corser, OBE	For service to the community in helping to establish Australia's first Urological Research Centre and the new Ngala Resource Centre for Parents and Baby in Crisis.	
Lindsay Gordon Cuming	For service to business and commerce, particularly as Chairman of the Management and Investment Companies Licensing Board, and to the community, the Epworth Hospital as President and Trustee of the Epworth Medical Foundation.	
Dr Agnes Mary Daly	For service to the community in the area of aged welfare through the Council of the Ageing Queensland Inc and the Brisbane Chapter of the University of the Third Age.	
Mary Lucy Davidson	For service to the community as a member of Meals on Wheels for the past 23 years, including service as National President of Meals on Wheels Australia.	
Susanna Mary de Vries-Evans	For service to art as an author and lecturer in Australian and European art history and history.	
Dr William Thomas Denholm	Citation does not appear in gazette.	
Sandra Kaye Dill	For service to the community as a consumer advocate in the area of infertility through the International Federation of Infertility Patient Associations and the National Infertility Network.	
Michael Sydney Doohan	For service to the sport of motorcycle racing in the 500cc motorcycle class as the winner of two 500cc world motorcycle championships (1994 and 1995).	
Eleanor Elizabeth Evans	For service to the community as Secretary of the Society of Friends (Quakers) Australia and as a founding member of the Domestic Violence Action Group.	
Harry Norman George Farrington	For service to the community, particularly to youth, the aged and the homeless as the founder of Open House Christian Involvement Centres.	
Martin John Ferguson	For service to industrial relations and the Trade Union movement, in particular as President of the Australian Council of Trade Unions.	
Fred Derek Osmond Fielding	For service to higher education and librarianship, in particular through the University of Queensland and the Australian Advisory Council on Bibliographical Services.	
Dr Paul Farrington Finlayson	For service to medicine and to the community.	
Clinical Associate Professor Keith Godfrey	For service to dentistry as the Director of Graduate Studies in Orthodontics at the University of Sydney for the past 31 years including service as Associate Professor in Preventative Dentistry.	
Janne Deirdre Graham	For service to the community as an advocate for healthcare consumers through the Consumers' Health Forum and the National Health and Medical Research Council.	
Duncan Allen Gray	For service to people with hearing impairment through Better Hearing Australia at both the state and national levels, and the Deafness Forum.	
Maxine Miriam Green	For service to medicine as a physiotherapist for children with physical disabilities through the St Giles Society.	
Professor Roy David Guthrie	For service to higher education particularly as Vice-Chancellor of the University of Technology, Sydney, from 1988–1996.	
Trevor Ronald Hendy	For service to surf lifesaving and the sport of swimming as the winner of four consecutive World Ironman titles and six-time winner of the Australian Ironman title.	
Dr Patricia Verne Kailis, OBE	For service to medicine as a genetic counsellor for neurological and neuromuscular disorders, to the Human Genetics Societies of WA, the Royal Perth Hospital and to Rocky Bay Inc for over 20 years.	
Bernard Francis Kilgariff, OAM	For continued service to the Northern Territory through the Northern Territory Landcare Council, the Anti-Rabbit Research Foundation, the Cattleman's Association, the Australia Day Council and St John Ambulance.	
Annette Grace Knight	For service to local government, particularly through the WA Municipal Association, the Country Urban Councils Association and as Mayor of Albany since 1988 and to the community.	
Gregory Joseph Lalor	For his honorary contribution to swimming, particularly as chairman of the Queensland Swimming Association since 1973.	
Geoffrey Lawrence Lumsdaine	For service to the Institute of Arbitrators, as Chairman of the NSW Chapter Practice Committee since 1986, and to the architecture profession.	
Rose McAleer	For service to microbiology as a medical mycologist and for contributions to the Australian Society of Microbiology and associated national and international bodies.	
John Pearce Maddern	For service to medicine as Head of the Department of Urology at Royal Adelaide Hospital to the Urological Society of Australasia and to the community as a Board Member of St Andrews Hospital.	
Judith Alison Maestracci	For service to the tourism industry particularly in the development and marketing of regional tourism organisations as well as support of Australian sport and major international sporting events.	
Christobel Rosemary Mattingley	For service to literature, particularly children's literature, and for community service through her commitment to social and cultural issues.	
Dr Peter May	For service to viticulture and oenology through research and development and as foundation editor of the Australian Journal of Grape and Wine Research.	
Janet Elizabeth Bridget Meagher	For service as an advocate for people with mental illness and psychiatric disability through the Australian National and NSW Associations for Mental Health and the Australian Psychiatric Disability Coalition Inc.	
Margaret Helen Mittelheuser	For service to the finance industry as an investment advisor, to the stockbroking industry and to the community through cultural and educational organisations.	
John Masson Moody	For service to education as Headmaster of Guildford Grammar School since 1979 and through the Association of Heads of Independent Schools of Australia.	
John Paul Morris	For service to the law, particularly as inaugural Chief Magistrate of Tasmania from 1987 until 1994, and to the community, particularly through the Tasmanian Council of Social Service.	
Dr David Hugh Palmer	For service to geriatric medicine and those with disabilities in the Orana and Far West areas of New South Wales through the provision of medical and welfare services.	
Professor Stuart Phillip Pegg	For service to medicine particularly as Director of the Burns Units of Royal Brisbane and Royal Children's Hospitals since 1977, and as Vice-President of the International Burns Society since 1990.	
Carol Joyce Perks	For service to the health and welfare of people in remote areas of Laos as an adviser with the Save the Children Fund, Australia's Integrated Primary Health Care and Maternal and Child Health Project.	
The Honourable Justice Philip Ernest Powell	For service to the law through the NSW Supreme Court since 1977 and as an executive member of the Law Council of Australia and the Australian Law Council Foundation.	
Ian Francis Reynolds	For service as an engineer and manufacturer to the Australian liquified petroleum gas industry through the development and implementation of safety standards.	
Hugh King Roberts	For service to the law as Crown Solicitor of NSW and as an executive member of the Australian Institute of Administrative Law and the Government Lawyers Committee of the Law Society.	
Dr Bruce Dalway Shepherd	For service to children with impaired hearing through the establishment in 1972 of the Shepherd Centre for Deaf Children and its continued administration.	
Ethnee Patricia Shields	For service in the field of mental health, particularly through the Association for Relatives and Friends of the Mentally Ill, and the National and Tasmanian Community Advisory Groups on mental health.	
Dr Margaret Smith	For service to medicine, particularly her commitment to women's total health care through the establishment of the Centre of Affitudinal Health, and in the specialist field of obstetrics and gynaecology.	
Donald Stangle	For service to the ageing through the Carina and Districts Committee on the Ageing, the Senior Citizens Club and Meals on Wheels.	
Brian Charles Stanley	For service to industrial relations, particularly through the South Australian Industrial Court and Commission, and the community through the St Vincent de Paul Society.	
Patricia June Swan	For service to the Aboriginal community through the development and implementation of public and mental health policies.	
Dr Peter Darcy Tannock	For service to education, particularly through the Catholic Education Commission and Notre Dame University.	
John Geoffrey Tracey	For service to conservation and the environment, particularly tropical forest maintenance and planting in North Queensland, through the organisation Trees for the Evelyn and Atherton Tablelands (TREAT).	
Peter John Wills	For service to the community particularly as Chairman of the Garvan Institute of Medical Research and Director of the Garvan Research Foundation as well as membership of cultural and educational organisations.	
Helen Withers	For service to rural New South Wales particularly through the Isolated Children's Parents' Association, the Ministerial Advisory Committee on Rural Education and the Telecom Regional Consumer Council.	
Kenneth George Wyatt	For service to the Aboriginal community, particularly in the fields of health education and employment through his work with the WA Departments of Health and Education and the Equal Opportunity Tribunal.	

==== Military Division ====
Branch	Recipient	Citation	Notes
Navy	Commodore Geoffrey John Earley, RAN	For service to the Australian Defence Force, particularly as the Director General Service Conditions.	
Navy	Captain Sydney Philip Lemon, RAN	For exceptional service to the RAN particularly in the field of logistic systems development and management.	
Navy	Captain Geoffrey Francis Smith, RAN	For exceptional service to the Australian Defence Force, particularly as Commanding Officer of HMAS Perth. (revoked in 2015)	
Navy	Captain Geoffrey Ross Walpole, RAN	For exceptional service to the Combat Force of the RAN and particularly as the Director Combat Force Development (Sea).	
Army	Lieutenant Colonel Leonard Edwin Batten	For service to the Army as Battery Commander 131st Divisional Locating Battery and Commanding Officer of the Base Administrative Support Centre, Liverpool.	
Army	Brigadier Paul Thomas Richard Buckley	For service to the Australian Defence Force in the field of military medicine.	
Army	Brigadier Clifton Ralph Russell Hoeben, RFD	For exceptional service to the Army as Commander of the 8th Brigade.	
Army	Lieutenant Colonel Maurice Raymond McNarn	For exceptional service to the Royal Australian Signals Corps and as the Commanding Officer 1st Signal Regiment.	
Army	Colonel Peter Charles Simpson	For service in the field of Army Aviation.	
Army	Brigadier Christopher Effey Stephens	For exceptional service in the fields of Army Public Affairs, corporate and personnel management.	
Air Force	Group Captain Robert Barham Black, RFD	For exceptional service to the RAAF Specialist Reserve.	
Air Force	Wing Commander Peter James Burgess	For exceptional service to the RAAF in the field of analytical and strategic inventory management logistics systems.	
Air Force	Squadron Leader Carol Emmeline Dale	For exceptional service to the RAAF in the field of supply logistics.	
Air Force	Wing Commander David Leslie Edwards	For exceptional service to the RAAF in the field of administration.	
Air Force	Wing Commander Ian Kingsley Scott	For exceptional service to the RAAF as Commanding Officer, No 37 Squadron, Richmond.	

=== Medal (OAM) ===
==== General Division ====
Recipient	Citation	Notes
Christopher Leigh Allen	For service to business and commerce through the Australian Society of Real Estate Agents and Valuers Lid and the Auctioneers and Agents Guild.	
Ronald Edward Atkins	For service to billiards and snooker as an administrator at national and international level.	
Mary Sylvia Baker-Weir	For service to the community as a voluntary worker for over 40 years caring for the welfare needs of the aged and people with physical disabilities.	
Beverley June Baldwin	For service to the community, particularly as co-ordinator of the Wyong Neighbourhood Centre.	
Brian Joseph Bannon	For service to parliament and politics in New South Wales and to administration of sport through the State Sports Centre.	
Eunice Patricia Barnes	For service to the community, particularly as a voluntary carer with the Elanora Nursing Home for the past 21 years.	
Sidney Keith Bartsch	For service to the community, particularly with the Australian Lutheran World Service.	
Neil Ross Bayles	For service to the sport of cricket and junior cricket.	
Francis James Joseph Beattie	For service to the community and the ex-service community in particular as an advisor and marshal of ceremonial parades for the R&SL of Australia (Queensland).	
John Noel Gordon Bellamy, AFC	For service to aviation as a producer of manuals for airline operators and as an organiser of air shows for charity.	
Cedric Lawrence Bellingham	For service to the community through the Naval Reserve Cadet scheme in Lismore.	
The Reverend Everard Harley Blackman	For service to the community as the Director of Lifeline in North Queensland since 1989.	
Kenneth Roy Blake	For service to the community through the Beechworth Hospital, the Beechworth and District Chamber of Commerce and the Beechworth Golf Club.	
Rosemary Catherine Bollen	For service to the community through the St Saviour's Neighbourhood Centre, Goulburn.	
Councillor Barry St Clair Orme Bolton	For service to local government through the Redcliff City Council, including service as Mayor since 1991.	
Annie Beatrice Bourke	For service to the community through 25 years voluntary service to The Infants Home, Ashfield.	
Ralph Edward Bower	For service to the transport industry, particularly the development of the Esperance Port Authority and to the community through the provision of sporting and aged care facilities.	
The Reverend Gordon Alfred Bradbery	For service to the community, particularly for his role during the 1994 Sydney bushfires and the subsequent relief efforts for those affected.	
William Bremner	For service to engineering, particularly the construction of ports, wharves and bulk handling facilities and to education through the engineering faculty of James Cook University.	
Heather Brittan	For service to music as a teacher and as President of the WA Music Teachers' Association since 1985.	
Graham Allen Brownbill	For service to local government, particularly with Bet Bet Shire Council for 23 years and the Northern District Municipal Association, and to the community through planning authorities, health, sporting and service groups.	
Stanley Edward Buckmaster	For service to the community as Founder/Manager of the Beerwah Progress Association which uses the profits from its recycling station to provide local services.	
Derek Edward Robert Bunyan	For service to the community, particularly through his contributions to the Boards of Management of the La Trobe Regional and Frankston Hospitals and to local government.	
Malcolm William Campbell	For service to veterans and the community as a member and former Director and President of the Harbord Diggers Memorial Club.	
Averil Garnet Reta Chadwick	For services to the community through the St John Ambulance Nursing Division, as a foundation member in 1952 and as District Officer from 1972 until her recent retirement.	
Sister Emmanuel Chapman	For service to education, particularly in Aboriginal communities in the Northern Territory.	
Thomas William Cherrey	For service to the private security industry, particularly to the Victorian Security Institute and to the Institute of Security Management.	
Frank Allan Cherry	For service to the trade union movement, particularly through the Australian Metal Workers Union where he has served as State Secretary since 1989.	
Raymond Chin	For service to the community, particularly through the Chung Wah Society, and to veterans and their dependants through the Darwin Sub-Branch of the R&SL.	
Ronald Maxwell Churcher	For service to the community, particularly through the Development Eisteddfod Society, local government and as a Rotarian.	
Eric Spencer Clapham	For service to music through his work for opera and ballet as an orchestral conductor and, in more recent years, as a teacher of voice.	
John Raymond Coates	For service to lawn bowls at club, district and state level, and to the aged.	
John Cohen	For service to the community through his Presidency of the North-East Alliance for the Mentally Ill, Legacy, and to local government through the Eltham Shire Council and Municipal Association of Victoria.	
Bruce Thomas Colcott	For service to Aboriginal people, particularly as the Statewide Manager of sixteen Aboriginal Community Justice Panels.	
Oswald John Cotter	For service to the welfare of veterans and to the community, particularly through the Parramatta R&SL as President since 1987, and as the Custodian of the City of Parramatta Memorial Cenotaph for the past 32 years.	
Major Douglas Gordon Bruce Cumming	For service to the community of the Eastern Suburbs of Sydney, particularly through aged care, child care, mothercraft, the Uniting Church and the Waverly Historical Society.	
James Cecil Cummings	For service to the people with disabilities through the Children's Cancer and Leukaemia Society since 1975, FOCAL Extended, and in establishing organisations for the disabled.	
Marjorie Isobel Cuthbert	For service to nursing as an administrator, educator, researcher and consultant, initiating nursing programmes which benefit both patient and staff.	
Valmae Mary Dale	For service to the care and rehabilitation of injured wildlife through the Inala Community Conservation Association.	
Frank Joseph Daly	For service to veterans, particularly through the United Disabled Servicemen's Association for over 35 years.	
Thomas Arthur Day	For service to Australia Post and to the people of Alice Springs and the surrounding districts for over 40 years.	
Roslyn Ruth De Luca	For service to youth and sport, particularly netball and swimming in the Manly-Warringah area for 47 years, as couch, umpire and administrator.	
John Wallace Dickenson	For service to flying, through the invention of the "Delta Ski Wing" and to the development of hang-gliding, paragliding and the microlite aeroplane.	
Donato Di Fabrizio	For service to the steel construction industry and to soccer, through the Morwell Falcons Soccer Club.	
Giovanni Di Fabrizio	For service to the steel construction industry and the Italian Australian Sporting and Social Club of Gippsland, as former President and now Patron.	
Barbara Mary Dinnie	For service to rural women, particularly as a member of the Country Women's Association for 40 years, including State President from 1991 to 1994.	
Gwyneth Anne Dixon	For service to the musical and cultural life of Tasmania since 1938, particularly as a performer, singing teacher and as founder of the Tasmanian Casting Service.	
Phillip John Dobbs	For service to the welfare of veterans as an active member of the R&SL since 1944, President of Corrimal Sub-Branch since 1970 and Vice-Chairman of the Corrimal Diggers Rest Home since 1991.	
Marion Ruth Dormer	For service to the community, particularly to the preservation of local history as the editor and compiler of more than twenty major regional histories.	
Ronald Douglas	For service to the Clan Douglas Association of Australia as Convenor and President and to the Toowoomba Caledonian Society for the past 34 years.	
Dorothy Joan Dowson, MBE	For service to the community, particularly to the R&SL and ex-service women, Red Cross, Girl Guides and as a member of the Cancer Crusade of WA for 30 years.	
Ljerka Maria Drapac	For service to the social, educational and cultural life of the Croatian community in Adelaide and as a foundation teacher at the Croatian School.	
Sister Anna Duble	For service to the frail and elderly, particularly in the Italian community and as the co-ordinator of CO.AS.IT. Italian Assistance Associations Visitation Programme since 1985.	
Robert Hugh Ducat	For service to country football and administration, particularly with the Waaia Football Club and the Picola and District Football League.	
William Thomas Duggan	For service to conservation and the environment, particularly as a member of the Federal Executive and Vice-Chairman of Keep Australia Beautiful Victoria.	
Mary Nina Edwards	For service to the community and to youth, particularly through the Girls Brigade, as Founding Captain of the 36th Company of the Brisbane Girls Brigade at Wynnum.	
Neil El-Kadomi	For service to the Arab speaking community in the Parramatta region and to the Parramatta Islamic Cultural Association.	
Robert John Elkerton	For service to the community, particularly as the vice-chairman of the Tasmanian Red Cross and Chairman of the Combined Meals on Wheels Committee.	
John Andrew Elliott	For service to the Gold Coast Hinterland Historical Society as foundation member and President.	
Alan Robert Elmslie	For service to the community, particularly through the mothercraft organisation, Tresillian Society and Family Care Centres over 25 years.	
Denis Daniel Farrington	For service to the community through music and entertainment for over 50 years, also by supporting many charities through fundraising efforts.	
John Edwin Feehan	For service to science and entomology through research on and promotion of the use of dung beetles.	
Laura May Ferguson	For service to the community through the Mordialloc Historical Society since 1963 and as Honorary Historian for the City of Mordialloc.	
Valda Esther Finley	For service to the aged and the community as a member of the Perth Jewish Homes for the Aged and as a member of Better Hearing.	
Sister Pauline Elizabeth Fitz-Walter	For service to the disadvantaged, particularly those with psychiatric disabilities, drug dependencies and homeless people through the establishment of Houses of St Francis of Assisi throughout NSW and Queensland.	
Lloyd Thomas Forge	For service to the community, particularly the Maryborough Show Society and through making wooden toys and articles for fundraising.	
Kenneth Herbert Franklin	For service to the community, particularly as Chairman of the Mackay Local Ambulance Committee and through Rotary.	
Richard Allan French	For service to the sport of cricket, particularly the umpiring of Sheffield Shield competitions, Test matches and One Day Internationals and in the Sydney Competition.	
George Frey	For service to the Jewish community, particularly as President of the Jewish National Fund Commission of Queensland.	
Owen John Garde	For service to art as a portrait painter and for the donation of a complete set of portraits of the Lord Mayors of Perth to the people of Western Australia.	
Thomas Ronald Garnett	For service to horticulture as a pioneer in the identification of climatic zones for plants in Australia and as an author on matters of horticultural interest.	
Raymond Frederick Geise	For service to the community, particularly to youth through TOC H Australia, as Queensland and Australian Commissioner.	
Murray Murvin Gerschwitz	For service to the community of Minnipa and the Eyre Peninsula through local government, sporting, educational and rural organisations.	
Bruce Campbell Gibson	For service to the community, particularly the welfare of the elderly and as Chairman of Homefield Aged Persons Home.	
Vincent Patrick Gilligan	For service to veterans and the local community through the Paddington-Woollahra Sub-Branch of the R&SL since 1958.	
Margery Constance Gilmore	For service to war widows and veterans in the Australian Capital Territory and for establishing the Field of Remembrance at St John's Anglican Church, Reid.	
Dr Mervyn Roy Gold	For service to medicine in the field of dermatology over many years including service as Visiting Dermatologist and Superintendent of the Rockhampton Base Hospital.	
Mary Elizabeth Greatorex	For service to the community, particularly the welfare of the elderly as the Co-ordinator of St Agnes Caring Group, Mt Gravatt for the past 18 years.	
Jack Vernon Griffiths	For service to the welfare of veterans particularly through the Rats of Tobruk Association, Newcastle for over 40 years and as President of the Gallipoli Legion Club since 1981.	
Daphne Lorraine Gum, MBE	For service to the education and welfare of children and adults with physical and intellectual disabilities, particularly through Marjorie Black House and Ashford House School.	
Evelyn Judy Hall	For service to music education as a teacher of piano in the La Trobe Valley and West Gippsland for 50 years.	
Donald Johnstone Halliwell	For service to golf administration at international, national, state and club levels, serving as President of the Australian Golf Union 1987 and 1993.	
Thomas Edward Hanley	For service to the Australian Numismatics Society for 45 years as President, Treasurer and Secretary.	
Doreen May Harber	For service to youth, particularly through the Guilford Guides and Scouts Movements holding executive positions for over 40 years, and to the community.	
Ernest Thomas Harrison	For service to the community, particularly as an executive member of the Waterloo Bay 50s and Over Leisure Centre, Wynnum State High School, the Red Shield Appeal and the Blue Nursing Service.	
Malcolm Harrop	For service to conservation as Co-Chairman of the International Public Relations Association World Taskforce on the Environment, to sport, jazz and to education.	
Norton Roy Harvey	For service to the arts as a photographer and to photographic organisations, particularly the Launceston Photographic Society, the Tasmanian Photographic Federation and the Australian Photographic Society.	
John William Hastie	For service to community organisations, particularly as an initiator and management committee member of child care centres and the John Paul Village aged care complex.	
John Graham Wilfred Head	For service to breeding Australian pedigree dogs and to associated organisations as a state and national delegate administrator exhibitor and as a national and international judge.	
Dorothy May Heron	For service to veterans particularly through the Queensland Ex-Service Literacy, Art, Craft and Photography Competition, the state RAAF and WAAAF Associations and the War Widows' Guild.	
Mary Ella Hill	For service to education through developing literacy programmes for disadvantaged youth and adults and to leadership training within the Girl Guides Association of Tasmania and the World Association of Girl Guides and Girl Scouts.	
Thelma Mary Hoad	For service to the community health as a foundation member of the Australian Tinnitus Association in 1984 serving as president since 1987.	
Councillor Kevin Prosser Hockey	For service to local government and to associated organisations including executive membership of the Local Government Association of Queensland and the Central and Upper Burnett Local Government Association.	
Donald Frank Hogarth	For service to fundraising for medical research and community organisations, particularly through the Baker Medical Research and Baker Benefactions.	
Clarice Muriel Hopgood	For service to music, particularly as a foundation and executive member of the Australian Society of Keyboard Music.	
Harold Keith Horsley	For service to marine safety as a member of the Royal Volunteer Coastal Patrol since 1943, as the Victorian representative on the National Council and as Search Master of the Broken Bay Division.	
Brian Robert Hungerford	For service to the community, particularly as Captain, Senior Deputy Captain and Vice-President of the Mount Tomah Volunteer Bush Fire Brigade.	
Doris Gwendoline Hyde	For service to swimming as a multiple medallist in world swimming championships as President of the Randwick and Coogee Ladies Swimming Club and as a 'Learn to Swim' instructor for the NSW Swimming Association.	
Allan Gordon Imrie	For service to surf life saving through the Burleigh Heads/Mowbray Park Surf Life Saving Club as a title holder, administrator and instructor.	
Ian Robert Inglis	For service to local government and to the Geelong community.	
Jeffery George Isaacs	For service to art and Australia's defence heritage as the Defence Artist in the Department of Defence.	
Dr Veronica Jean James	For service to education, particularly through science and mathematics camps for children with hearing impairments and through establishing the NSW Physics Olympiad.	
Graham Douglas Jensen	For service to primary industry organisations including the Queensland Chamber of Agricultural Societies, their Federal Council, the Darling Downs Young Judges Competition and the Dalby Show.	
Bryan Jones	For service to education and related organisations developing broad based vocational training programmes with the Email Limited Group of Companies.	
Helene Jones	For service to community music, particularly through the Rockhampton Chamber Music Society, choirs, and arts organisations.	
Robert Samuel Jones	For service to veterans, particularly as Federal President and Secretary of the Partially Blinded Soldiers' Association of Australia.	
Jayalukshimy Kandiah	For service to the arts and to the community as Artistic Director of the Natanalaya School of Music and Dance.	
Barbara Beatrice Kearney	For service to the Guide movement since 1946 supporting and advising on multicultural programmes and for service to the community.	
Langley Richard David Kidby	For service to community history, particularly by re-enacting in 1994 the flight by the Smith Brothers from England to Australia.	
Lou Klepac	For service to the arts, particularly as a curator, writer, lecturer and publisher of fine art and art books.	
Jozef Kuszell	For service to the Polish community through the Polish Community Council of Victoria, the Federal Council of Polish Organisations in Australia and the Polish Arts Festival.	
Raymond Man-Yung Lam	For service to the Chinese community, particularly as President of the Box Hill Chinese Elderly Citizens Club.	
Councillor David John Morrissey (Darby) Land	For service to local government through the Paroo Shire Council and to the community.	
Elizabeth Mary Lee	For service to the Proserpine community particularly by entertaining and fundraising for aged and frail people.	
Gary Lee-Gaston	For service the arts as a painter, sculptor and commercial artist.	
Sotiria Liangis	For service to the Greek community, particularly the aged and through St Nicholas Greek Orthodox Church, Canberra.	
Marika Lucas	For service to the Greek community, particularly as president of the Greek Women's Society of South Australia.	
Beryl MacDonald	For service to veterans, particularly through the Ex-Servicewomen's Association (NSW).	
Dr Peter Wynne McCartney	For service to medicine particularly as Director of Hyperbaric and Diving Medicine at the Royal Hobart Hospital.	
Robert McCullough	For service to sport through the Australian Paralympic Federation, North Queensland Games Foundation and Little Athletics.	
Alastair Robertson Macpherson	For service to sport, as an international full bore rifle shooting competitor, coach, captain and as an executive member of national shooting bodies.	
Henry George McGregor	For service to veterans, by representing them at sub-branch, district and state levels, as instigator and coordinator of the 'Australian Spirit' project, and to the community.	
Duncan John Powis McIntyre	For service to horticulture, by serving on organisations supporting fruit growers.	
Dr James Edward McKew	For service to music through the Geelong Folk Music Club and the Port Fairy Folk Music Festival.	
Dianne Rosemary McKissock	For service to the community as Co-Founder and Co-Director of the Bereavement Care Centre at Lewisham.	
Malcolm McKissock	For service to the community as Co-Founder and Co-Director of the Bereavement Care Centre at Lewisham.	
Roger Vere McNeice	For service to the community and community history as founder of the Tasmanian Numismatic Society and as a member of fire brigades recording and publishing related histories.	
John Richard Maitland	For service to the Wingham, Taree and Manning River communities through the Manning River District Hospital, Legacy and the welfare of veterans.	
Dr Norman Marinovich	For service to aged care through the Villa Dalmacia Nursing Home, Home and Community Care Advisory Committee, the Australian Geriatric Society (WA) and the Silver Chain Nursing Association.	
Clifford William Marsh	For service to surf life saving at club state national and international levels.	
William George Marshall	For service to surf life saving in executive positions at all levels during a period of 52 years.	
Iola Lindsay Mathews	For service to women's issues, particularly in the promotion of policies supporting reforms for women at work.	
James Thornton Mealing	For service to the community particularly through the improvement of sporting and other facilities in Kuranda.	
Hedley Arthur Miles	For service to agricultural education as an adviser. To local government in the East Loddon Shire and to the community.	
Jack Austin Miller	For service to the community, particularly through St Luke's Concord Soccer Football Club and the St Luke's Parish.	
Stewart Miller	For service to the Alstonville community through the Tidy Towns Committee, tree planting projects and the Agricultural Society.	
Henry William Moakes	For service to the community as founder of the Green Gully Soccer Club, through the St Albans Ethnic Association and organisations assisting the aged.	
Robert Maxwell Morrow	For service to junior cricket as Founder and President of the Glen Waverley Junior Cricket League.	
Patricia Blake Murdoch	For service to the community as honorary psychologist to the Victorian SES and through the development of programmes to manage critical incident stress.	
Marjorie Ann Murray	For service to the community through the Palmwoods Singers Theatrical Society whose stage productions raise money for hospitals and local community organisations.	
Pauline May Murray	For service to the community through the establishment of organisations in the Canberra region providing support, information and social activities for people with stroke related disabilities.	
Carolyn Beryl Murrell	For service as a sports administrator, to people who are blind or vision impaired, and in the areas of educational and employment opportunities.	
Marion Helen Nairn	For service to the community through the Guide Association, WA including service as State Commissioner and through the Australia Day Council of WA.	
Henry John Nathan	For service to the community as founder and president of Heartbeat Victoria which raises funds to purchase equipment for hospitals and provides counselling for open heart surgery patients.	
William Henry Nixon	For service to the Bundaberg community, particularly through Meilene Home for the Aged, Lifeline, the Totally and Permanently Disabled Soldiers Association and Surf Life Saving.	
Robin James Nuttall	For service to the community through the Scout Association, including service as Area Commissioner for Ballarat and through Rotary and Apex.	
Terrence William O'Brien	For service to the community through Catholic school boards in Canberra and Goulburn, Rugby Union football and the Canberra Motor Neurone Disease Care and Support Group	
The Reverend Thomas Francis O'Donovan	For service to religion through the Jesuit Indian Mission in Australia and school education.	
John David Oates	For service to the community through the Sydney Presbytery of the Presbyterian Church of Australia, the PLC Board as Chairman since 1985 and the Association of Independent Schools (NSW).	
Maxwell Charles Parsons	For service to veterans and the community through the 2/12 Field Regiment Association and the recording of military history.	
Colin William Peasley	For service to dance particularly through the Australian Ballet as a dancer, Regisseur General and since 1993 Educational Programme Manager.	
Dr James Peters	For service to medicine as an ophthalmic surgeon whose area of expertise is cataract and intraocular implant surgery.	
Terry Kenneth Peterson	For service to surf lifesaving, particularly as President of the Black Rock Life Saving Club since 1976.	
Colin Arthur Phillips	For service to golf as Executive Director of the Australian Golf Union for the past 20 years.	
Norman Frederick Pickles	For service to industrial relations, particularly through the Maritime Union of Australia and the Waterside Workers Federation.	
Hazel McIntosh Pither	For service to the Equestrian Federation of Australia as an Executive Member of the Western Australian Branch since 1971 and to the Pony Club Association of Western Australia.	
Kevin Michael Power	For service to music as Chorus Master and Musical Director of the Queensland State and Municipal Choir for the past 13 years.	
Francis Harry Quinn	For service to entertainment as "The Great Franquin" who performed shows based on memory feats, mesmerism and hypnosis in Australia and overseas.	
Colin Arthur Raven	For service to the community as Mortuary Manager of the State Health Laboratory (Perth) for 25 years.	
Mike Raymond	For service to the media and to motor sports as Motor Sport Director, Host and Chief Commentator for the Seven Network for 36 years.	
June Redman	For service to the community of Harrington as a fundraiser and organiser of community entertainment.	
Douglas Hugh Reid	For service to horseracing and the bloodhorse breeding industry through the Victoria Racing Club and the Bloodhorse Breeders Association of Victoria.	
Ruby Eileen Riach	For service to education as a teacher and administrator, including service as Honorary Secretary of the NSW Chapter of the Australian College of Education since 1988.	
Flora Hunter Richardson	For service to community organisations including the Woorndoo Land Protection Group, the South-West Agroforestry Network, the Cubs and Guides Movement and the Perendale Association.	
Philip Arthur Rickards	For service to primary industry as Foundation Director of the Agricultural Business Research Institute for 23 years.	
Dr Edgar Frederick Riek	For service to viticulture through the Canberra and District Winegrowers Association and the Canberra National Wine Show and to entomology.	
Samantha Linette Pearl Riley	For service to swimming as a gold medallist and world record holder in the 100 and 200 metres breaststroke events.	
Elizabeth Ramsay Rintoul	For service to community organisations including St Andrews Meals on Wheels and Camp Magnetic.	
Walter Edward Robertson	For service to veterans through the Port Fairy R&SL (Vic) and to local government as a councillor on the Belfast Shire Council for 19 years.	
Cecil John Ryan	For service to the community of Barcaldine, particularly through historical, sporting and charitable organisations.	
Caroline Mary (Betty) Sapwell	For service to badminton as an executive member of the Geelong Women's Badminton Association and the Geelong Badminton Association Junior Committee for many years.	
Vera Elizabeth Scarth-Johnson	For service to art as a watercolour artist specialising in the native flora of Cooktown and the Endeavour River region of Queensland.	
Dr Henning Schou	For service to the conservation and preservation of film and sound, particularly the National Film and Sound Archive and the National Library of Australia.	
Roy Scott	For service to the community, particularly through the Liverpool Hospital where he has served as a Director since 1981.	
Patricia Lucy Searles	For service to community health through the establishment of the Drug Users and Parents Aid Foundation in 1975.	
Frank Seiver	For service to veterans through the Australian Legion of Ex-Servicemen and Women as National President since 1994 and State Executive Member since 1962.	
Reginald Robert Shaw	For service to veterans as welfare officer of the Hervey Bay R&SL for the past 15 years.	
Phyllis Joyce Skinner	For service to the performing arts as a dance lecturer and historian, choreographer and artistic director.	
Karen Joy Smith	For service to the community as a member of the Isolated Children's Parents Association of the Northern Territory since 1982 and currently as President.	
Fleur Spitzer	For service to women, particularly the ageing through the establishment of the Alma Unit at the University of Melbourne.	
Janice Ann Staniforth	For service to children with physical disabilities as Director of the Montrose Home (Queensland Society for Crippled Children) for 13 years).	
Maurice Oliver Stead	For service to music and training of musicians as founding Concertmaster of the Australian Opera and Ballet Orchestra and, later, concertmaster of the State Orchestra of Victoria.	
James Herbert Steele	For service to trade unions as Secretary of the Queensland Branch of the Seamen's Union of Australia for 25 years.	
Iris Ada Stephenson	For service to youth and children with disabilities as an instructor in equestrian skills and to the pony club movement.	
Donald Sundermann	For service to local government through the Maffra Shire Council for 27 years, and to the community, particularly as Captain of Dawson Rural Fire Brigade for 23 years.	
Trevor Cecil Taplin	For service to veterans as Honorary Treasurer of the Royal Australian Signals Association since 1952 and to the community.	
John Frederick Tapp	For service to horse sports as a national and international racecaller, and to charitable organisations as an organiser and compere of fundraising events.	
Charles John Taylor	For service to surf life saving over 62 years through the Burleigh Heads/Mowbray Park Surf Life Saving Club, and as a Delegate and State Examiner for more than 25 years.	
Professor Walter Charles Taylor	For service to science as Professor of Organic Chemistry at the University of Sydney and through the UNESCO Regional Network for the Chemistry of Natural Products in South East Asia.	
Arthur Albert Thane	For service to charitable organisations and fundraising activities by making and donating wooden toys.	
James B. Thiele	For service to church and community music as senior organist at Bethlehem Lutheran Church, Adelaide and as a director of choirs.	
Raymond Joseph Torrington	For service to veterans as Honorary Secretary of the 2/2 Infantry Battalion for 45 years and to the community.	
Anthony van Toll	For service to the arts as Chairman of the WA Opera Company for 16 years and through the WA Academy of Performing Arts and the National Council of The Australian Opera Company.	
Thelma Rose Varney	For service to the community, particularly through the Women's Auxiliary of the Tamworth Sub-Branch of the R&SL and the Tamworth War Widows Guild.	
Mavis Gwendoline Vernon	For service to the community as Honorary Secretary of the Council of St Bartholomew's House.	
Leedham Charles Walker	For service to the community of Flinders Island, particularly in the establishment of a shipping service, and to local government, retailing and the building industry.	
Barry Reginald Waters	For service to the community of Coburg and district, particularly through the Helping Hand Association.	
Brian Sidney Waters	For service to education as Registrar of the Queensland University of Technology for 20 years, including overseeing the amalgamation of the two colleges which led to its formation.	
Eric Albert Watson	For service to community history, particularly as President of the Australian Society of World War I Aero Historians, and in the compilation of records for the Oral History collection of the National Library.	
Joan Hilary Watts	For service to children as President of the Richmond South Kindergarten for 21 years.	
Lieutenant Colonel Elizabeth Jane Webb	For service to the community, particularly women, and Australian Church Women through the Salvation Army, the National Council of Women and the ACT Unit of Australian Church Women.	
Dr John Mark Webb	For service to science through his research in the area of Bioinorganic Chemistry and his contribution to the Asian Network for Analytical and Inorganic Chemistry.	
Clarence David Whitchurch	For service to the community of Ivanhoe through local government, service groups and sporting organisations.	
Jean Christian Whiter	For service to the community, particularly by establishing in 1981 the first volunteer coastal patrol station for Eden.	
Judith Phyllis Whyte	For service to social welfare through organisations including Lifeline, ACT Carers Association and the Parent Support Service.	
Donald Amos Wiburd	For service to youth as Secretary/Treasurer of the Western Associated Schools Sporting Association since its formation in the 1960s.	
Henry Gordon Williams	For service to veterans and to the community of Nambour through local government and service and charitable organisations.	
June Louisa Williams	For service to veterans and to the community of Nambour through service and charitable organisations.	
Neil Frederick Williams	For service to the community, particularly through the Lions Club International for 30 years and to the performing arts.	
John Willinge	For service to the shipping industry as a Member of the Bunbury Port Authority for over 30 years, including Chairmanship for 15 years.	
Gayford Norman Woltmann	For service to primary industry particularly as Founding President of the Pork Council of Australia.	
John Roy Woodrup	For service to the community of Port Fairy as a fundraiser for organisations including the Port Fairy Elderly People's Home and Port Fairy Hospital.	
Merlyn Audree Woodrup	For service to the community of Port Fairy as a fundraiser for organisations including the Port Fairy Elderly People's Home and Port Fairy Hospital.	
Dr Judith Anne Woolley (Mrs Stokes)	For service to the Central Coast community, particularly in the fields of community health and education.	
Lieutenant George Randall Woolmer, (Ret'd)	For service to the local history of the Barmera region through publications, restoration of significant buildings and by establishing reserves.	
Hazel May Woolston	For service to the community and the history of nursing through publications documenting the history of nursing and medical procedures and the history of many Sydney hospitals.	
Jessie Zempilas	For service to the Greek community of Western Australia for over 30 years, including Foundation Member and former President of Daughters of Penelope (AHEPA).	
Helen Zerefos	For service to charitable organisations by donating proceeds from her performances as a singer to bodies including the University of Sydney's Ageing and Alzheimer Research Foundation.	

==== Military Division ====
Branch	Recipient	Citation	Notes
Navy	Warrant Officer Marine Technical Phillip Kenton Johnson	For meritorious service to the Royal Australian Navy in HMAS Adelaide as the Deputy Marine Engineer Officer.	
Navy	Commander Darryl Laurence Neild	For meritorious service to the RAN as the Pacific Patrol Boat Project Director.	
Navy	Lieutenant Commander William John Shurey, RAN	For meritorious service to the RAN as the Seahawk Helicopter Flight Simulator Project Officer.	
Army	Warrant Officer Class Two David Thomas Alexander	For meritorious service as Company Sergeant Major of a Rifle Company, Support Company and Administrative Company, successively, in the 4th and 4th/3rd Battalion, The Royal New South Wales Regiment, over a period of 14 years.	
Army	Warrant Officer Class One Michael Anthony Caughey	For meritorious service to the Army, in particular as the Regimental Sergeant Major of the 51st Battalion, The Far North Queensland Regiment and the 3rd Battalion, The Royal Australian Regiment.	
Army	Warrant Officer Class One Glen Douglas Mackay	For meritorious service in support of Army units and Australian Defence Force personnel within Northern Command in the field of Catering.	
Army	Warrant Officer Class One Kevin Anthony Olivieri	For service to Army Education.	
Army	Warrant Officer Class Two Paul Anthony Trebilcock	For meritorious service to the Army as the Warrant Officer Counter-Intelligence of the Army Intelligence and Security Section, Melbourne.	
Army	Warrant Officer Class Two Paul Francis Tyrrell	For service to the Army in the field of Infantry Support Weapons.	
Army	Warrant Officer Class One Kevin James Woods	For meritorious performance of duty as Instructor, Careers Wing and Regimental Sergeant Major, School of Infantry and Regimental Sergeant Major, 49th Battalion, the Royal Queensland Regiment.	
Air Force	Warrant Officer Richard Howard Judd	For meritorious service to the RAAF in the field of technical training.	
Air Force	Warrant Officer Noel William Peterson	For meritorious service to the RAAF in the field of explosive ordnance.	
Air Force	Warrant Officer Richard Arthur David Southam	For meritorious service to the RAAF in the field of clerical supply training and management.	
