= Raydon Gates =

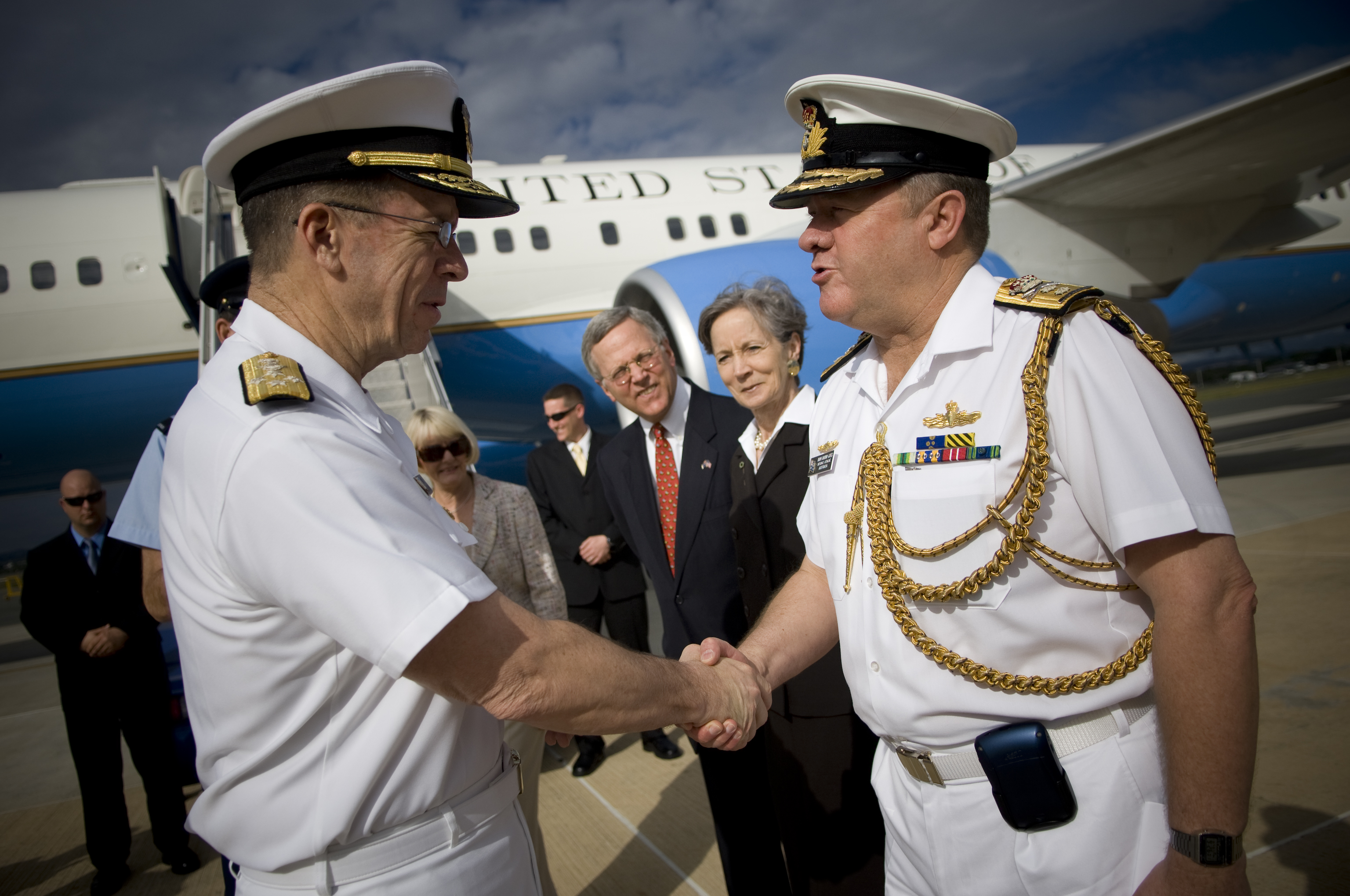
- Rear Admiral Raydon Gates (right) shaking hands with Admiral Michael Mullen, Chairman of the US Joint Chiefs of Staff, in Canberra in 2008
- Born: 1 January 1952 (age 74); Perth, Western Australia
- Military career
- Allegiance: Australia
- Branch: Royal Australian Navy
- Service years: 1971–2008
- Rank: Rear Admiral
- Commands: Maritime Commander Australia (2002–04); Australian Defence College (1999–02); HMAS Adelaide (1995–97); HMAS Canberra (1991–93)
- Awards: Officer of the Order of Australia; Conspicuous Service Medal; Ordre du Mérite Maritime (France); Legion of Merit (United States)
- Other work: Chief executive of Lockheed Martin Australia & New Zealand (2010–16)

Rear Admiral Raydon William Gates, AO, CSM (born 1 January 1952) is a retired senior officer of the Royal Australian Navy. He was later the chief executive of Lockheed Martin Australia & New Zealand from 2010 to 2016.

Military offices
Preceded by Rear Admiral Geoffrey Smith	Maritime Commander Australia; 2002–2004	Succeeded by Rear Admiral Rowan Moffitt
New title	Commander Australian Defence College; 1999–2002	Succeeded by Major General Jim Molan
