= Frank Martin (sport administrator) =

Frank Martin was Secretary-General of the Australian Paralympic Federation from 1994 to 1997. During this period, he was involved in Australian team preparations for the 1996 Atlanta Paralympics and represented the Federation in the organisation of the 2000 Sydney Paralympics.

At the 2000 Sydney Olympics, he was Venue Manager for taekwondo. He has held senior sport administration roles with Middle Harbour Yacht Club, Sydney Olympic Soccer Club, New South Wales Suburban Rugby Union, and New South Wales Futsal Association.

In 2009, he was the Australia Day ambassador for Muswellbrook Shire.
