= Glenn Tasker =

Australian sport administrator (1951–2019)

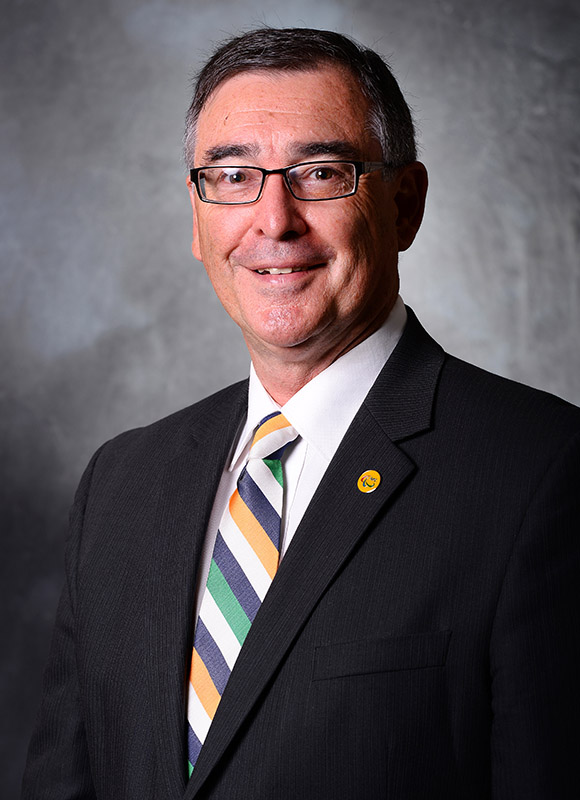

Personal details
- Born: 10 November 1951 Kogarah, New South Wales, Australia
- Died: 15 August 2019 (aged 67) Caringbah, New South Wales, Australia

Glenn Robert Tasker (10 November 1951 – 15 August 2019) was a leading Australian sport administrator particularly in swimming, tennis and the Paralympic movement. He was President of the Australian Paralympic Committee from 2013 to 2018.

== Sport administration career ==
Tasker was Executive Director of New South Wales Swimming from 1990 to 1998. During this appointment, he played a significant role in introducing events for swimmers with disabilities into the NSW Age Swimming Championships, a first for any Australian state swimming championship. From 1998 to 2000, he was Swimming Competition Manager at the Sydney 2000 Olympic and Paralympic Games. In 1999, he was the Event Manager of 1999 Pan Pacific Swimming Championships. After the Sydney Games, he was General Manager of the NSW Amateur Soccer Association. In 2001, he was appointed to Chief Executive Officer (CEO) of Swimming Australia, a position that he held until June 2008. Tasker took up the position when Swimming Australia was undertaking a period of major change with long standing national coach Don Talbot and executive director Vena Murray leaving the organisation. During his leadership at Swimming Australia, Australia had its most successful Olympics for the sport of swimming at the 2004 Athens Olympics since the 1956 Melbourne Olympics, winning seven gold medals. It also won five gold medals at the 2008 Beijing Olympics. Issues which Tasker managed whilst CEO included the leaking of Ian Thorpe's abnormal doping violation, Ian Thorpe's disqualification from the 400m Freestyle at the Olympic trials after a false start and Nick D'Arcy's removal from the Australian team at the 2008 Beijing Olympics after assaulting Simon Cowley.

Tasker resigned from Swimming Australia to return to his family located in Sydney and take up the position of Chief Executive Officer of Tennis NSW. He retired from Tennis NSW in July 2013. Whilst at Tennis NSW, there was an expansion of its Community Tennis Team to effectively service member clubs, associations and coaches and the development of GIO Wheelchair Tennis Centre of Excellence.

In 2014 Tasker came out of semi-retirement to take up the mantle of Chief Executive Officer of DragonBoats NSW Inc, where he was instrumental in helping the sport deal with large scale growth, implementing governance structures and wholesale changes to the sports administration across NSW. He held this role in a permanent part-time capacity until his retirement in 2017.

In 2008, Tasker was elected to the Australian Paralympic Committee Board and in December 2013 was elected President replacing Greg Hartung, who had resigned after 16 years in the position. Tasker also held the position of Vice-Chair of the International Paralympic Committee’s Sport Technical Committee for Swimming. In September 2018, he retired as President after serving five years.

Tasker died on 15 August 2019 at the age of 67 at a hospital in Caringbah, New South Wales.

== Education ==
Tasker earned a Diploma of Teaching from Mitchell College of Advanced Education, a Bachelor of Arts from the University of New England, and Master of Education from the University of Sydney.

== Recognition ==
Tasker was recognised for his work, receiving several awards including:

- Australian Sports Medal — 2000
- New South Wales Olympic Council Merit Award Recipient
- Australian Sports Commission's Service to Sport Award — 2017
