= Paralympics Australia =

National Paralympic Committee of Australia

National Paralympic Committee
- Country: Australia
- Code: AUS
- Created: 1990
- Continental association: OPC
- Headquarters: Sydney
- President: Grant Mizens
- Website: paralympic.org.au

Paralympics Australia (PA) previously called the Australian Paralympic Committee (APC) (1998–2019) is the National Paralympic Committee in Australia for the Paralympic Games movement. It oversees the preparation and management of Australian teams that participate at the Summer Paralympics and the Winter Paralympics.

APC played a major role in Australia's successful bid to host the 2000 Sydney Paralympics. Between the 1996 to 2016 Summer Paralympics, Australia has finished in the top five nations on the medal tally. It is also a successful nation at the Winter Paralympics.

== Membership ==
PA is a company limited by guarantee and its shareholders are national sports federations and national sporting organisations for disabled people.

== Administration ==
Paralympics Australia was established in 1990 as the Australian Paralympic Federation. It is governed by a board of directors which may include elected and appointed members.

=== Presidents ===
- Marcus Einfeld 1990–1992
- Sallyanne Atkinson 1992
- Ron Finneran 1993
- Bob McCullough 1994–1996
- Marie Little 1996–1997
- Greg Hartung 1997–2013
- Glenn Tasker 2013–2018
- Jock O'Callaghan 2018–2023
- Alison Creagh 2023–2025
- Grant Mizens 2025-

=== Secretary /chief executive officers ===
- Adrienne Smith 1990–1993
- Frank Martin 1994–1997
- Scott Derwin 1997–1999
- Brendan Flynn 1999–2003
- Darren Peters 2003–2009
- Miles Murphy 2009
- Jason Hellwig 2010–2015
- Lynne Anderson 2015–2021
- Catherine Clark 2022–2024
- Cameron Murray 2024–

== Milestones ==
Milestones in the development of the Australian Paralympic movement and Paralympics Australia:

- 1960 – Australia participated in the 1st Paralympic Games in Rome, Italy. The Australian team of 12 athletes won three gold, six silver and 1 bronze medals.
- 1962 – Perth hosted the 1st Commonwealth Paraplegic Games. It was the first international disability multi-sport held in Australia and raised the profile of disability sport.
- 1975 – Australian Confederation of Sports for the Disabled established.
- 1976 – 1st Winter Paralympic Games held in Sweden. Australia was unofficially represented at these Games by Ron Finneran, who competed but was not officially recognised as he did not fall into the amputee or visual impairment categories.
- 1977 – Sydney hosted the 2nd FESPIC Games, a multi-sport event for Far East and South Pacific athletes with a disability.
- 1981 – National Committee on Sport and Recreation established to make recommendations to the Minister for Sport on priority areas for the development of sport and recreation for disabled people including funding allocations.
- 1984 – Amputee swimmers and track and field athletes attended their first training camp at the Australian Institute of Sport (AIS) in preparation for the 1984 New York/Stoke Mandeville Paralympics.
- 1985 – inaugural Australia Games provided events for disabled athletes in athletics, swimming, basketball, lawn bowls, netball and weight lifting competitions.
- 1988 – Russell Short, a vision impaired thrower, became the first athlete with a disability to be offered a scholarship at the AIS.
- 1990 – The Australian Paralympic Federation was established to coordinate elite Australian athletes with a disability participation in the Paralympic Games and liaise with the International Paralympic Committee.
- 1990 – Australian Sports Commission Disabled Sports Program offered three AIS scholarships to athletes with a disability – Russell Short, Rodney Nugent and Dean Barton-Smith.
- 1991 – Chris Nunn commenced as part-time coach of Aussie Able Program located at the AIS. ).
- 1993 – Sydney won the right to host the 2000 Paralympic Games. Ron Finneran and Adrienne Smith lobbied to ensure that the Paralympics were part of Sydney's bid for the 2000 Olympics and they would be underwritten by the Federal and State Governments.
- 1993 – Michael Milton was the first winter Paralympian to receive an AIS scholarship.
- 1994 – Paralympic Preparation Program established by the Australian Sports Commission assist to athletes with a disability in their preparation for the 2000 Sydney Paralympics
- 1994 – Australian Paralympian of the Year established with wheelchair racer Louise Sauvage the first winner.
- 1998 – The Australian Paralympic Federation changed its name to the Australian Paralympic Committee. A new logo was created.
- 2000 – Sydney hosted the 11th Summer Paralympics, the first Games held outside the Northern Hemisphere. Australia finished first on the medal tally winning 149 medals – 63 gold, 39 silver and 47 bronze medals. It has been Australia's most successful summer Paralympics to date. At the end of the Games, International Paralympic Committee, Robert Steadward declared Sydney the "best Games ever".
- 2001 – AIS and APC established an AIS/APC Alpine Ski Program. It was the first single sport AIS program for athletes with a disability.
- 2002 – APC adopted a policy of mainstreaming that resulted in national sports organisations being responsible for the preparation of their athletes to Paralympic level.
- 2002 – Australia's best performance at Winter Paralympics winning six gold and one bronze medal at the Australia at the 2002 Winter Paralympics.
- 2005 – APC established the Paralympic Search Program to identify people with disabilities who had the athletic potential to represent Australia at Paralympic level competition. At the 2012 London Paralympics, 43 talent search program athletes represented Australia and won 28 medals.
- 2009 – APC and Australian Olympic Committee jointly submitted a National High Performance Plan for Olympic and Paralympic Sports in Australia to the Crawford Inquiry into Australian sport.
- 2009 – Greg Hartung, APC President, was elected the Vice President of the International Paralympic Committee Governing Board at a meeting of the IPC General Assembly in Kuala Lumpur.
- 2010 – The APC received an additional $3 million per annum as part of the Australian Government's sport reform package Australian Sport: The Pathway to Success.
- 2010 – The APC and Australian Defence Force (ADF) launched the ADF Paralympic Sport Program that aimed to direct ADF members, who acquired a disability during their employment, into Paralympic sport.
- 2011 – APC established Australian Paralympic Hall of Fame.
- 2011 – APC engaged the University of Queensland and the University of Canberra to write the History of the Paralympic Movement in Australia. This project is part of a larger project within the APC, to capture and archive valuable historical records of Australians at the Paralympics. as the country's first Centre for Paralympic Excellence.
- 2012 — Australia participated in the 14th Paralympic Games in London, England. The Australian team of 161 athletes won 32 gold, 23 silver and 30 bronze medals.
- 2013 – Greg Hartung steps down as President after 16 years in the position and replaced by Glenn Tasker.
- 2015 – Ski & Snowboard Australia took over the operation of the Paralympic winter sport. The APC had managed the program since 1994.
- 2016 – Australia participated in the 15th Paralympic Games in Rio de Janeiro, Brazil. The Australian team of 176 athletes won 22 gold, 30 silver and 29 bronze medals
- 2019 – Changed named to Paralympics Australia (PA) with a new logo.
- 2019 – Australian Government announced $12 million in funding to Paralympics Australia – $8 million for Australian Team at 2020 Tokyo Paralympics and $4 million for the development of training centre in Melbourne.
- 2024 - Australian Government $54.9 million investment in the lead up to 2028 Los Angeles Paralympic Games.
- 2025 - Paralympics Australia released Strategic Plan Horizon 2 – LA 2028 – ‘UPLIFT’ - plan for 2032 Brisbane Paralympics Games.

== See also ==
- Australian Olympic Committee
- Australia at the Paralympics
- Australia at the Summer Paralympics
- Australia at the Winter Paralympics
