= Confederation of Australian Sport =

Highest national body for sport in Australia

The Confederation of Australian Sport (CAS) is the highest national body for sport in Australia. It was established in 1976 to advance the interests of the Australian sports community and to give the industry a united voice in discussions and negotiations with governments and key stakeholders.

Leading netball player and administrator Eunice Gill was a founding committee member and later vice-president from 1982 to 1985.

The organization was founded by 42 individual sporting organizations. By 1985, the organization had 123 affiliates. These organizations represent 5.8 million Australians.

In November 2009, CAS announced that it was stepping back from its role as an advocate and governing body for the Australian sports industry.

== Bibliography ==
- Department of Sport, Recreation and Tourism; Australian Sport Commission (1985). Australian Sport, a profile. Canberra, Australia: Australian Government Publish Service. ISBN 0-644-03667-2.
