= Peter Gration =

Australian Army officer

Peter Courtney Gration
- Born: 6 January 1932 (age 94); Richmond, Victoria
- Relatives: Air Marshal Barry Gration (brother)
- Military career
- Allegiance: Australia
- Branch: Australian Army
- Service years: 1949–1993
- Rank: General
- Unit: Royal Australian Engineers
- Commands: Chief of the Defence Force (1987–93); Chief of the General Staff (1984–87); Deputy Chief of the General Staff (1983); Logistics Command (1979–80); Director of Engineers (1973–76); 1st Australian Civil Affairs Unit (1969–70)
- Conflicts: Malayan Emergency; Vietnam War
- Awards: Companion of the Order of Australia; Officer of the Order of the British Empire; Defence Meritorious Service Star (Indonesia)
- Other work: Colonel Commandant Royal Australian Engineers (2000–04); Honorary Colonel Melbourne University Regiment (1994–04)

General Peter Courtney Gration, AC, OBE, FTSE (born 6 January 1932) is a retired senior Australian Army officer who served in the positions of Chief of the General Staff (1984–87) and Chief of the Defence Force (1987–93), the professional head of the Australian Army and Australian Defence Force, respectively.

== Early life ==
Gration was born in Richmond, Victoria, on 6 January 1932 to David Roy Gration and his wife Margaret (née Fleming). David, a dental mechanic, had served in the First World War as a sapper on the Western Front and later enlisted in the Volunteer Defence Corps during the Second World War, discharging with the rank of corporal in 1945. Peter attended Scotch College, Melbourne from 1945 until matriculation in 1948, where he was active in the school's cricket, football, and athletics teams.

== Military career ==
Accepted into the Royal Military College, Duntroon, Gration began his course at the college in 1949. He graduated as a lieutenant three years later with the Queen's Medal, and was allocated to the Royal Australian Engineers. Over the following two years, Gration was a resident student at Ormond College in the University of Melbourne where he completed a Bachelor of Civil Engineering degree; Gration subsequently completed a Bachelor of Arts and Bachelor of Economics at the University of Queensland in later years.

Gration saw active service during the Malayan Emergency, before attending the British Army Staff College, Camberley in 1964. He completed a tour of duty during the Vietnam War between 1969 and 1970, during which time he was posted as commanding officer of the 1st Australian Civil Affairs Unit with the rank of lieutenant colonel. For his "distinguished services" in Vietnam, Gration was appointed an Officer of the Order of the British Empire in 1971.

In 1973, Gration was appointed Director of Engineers. Following that three-year stint, he was posted to a course at the United States Army War College. Gration was appointed an Officer of the Order of Australia in the 1984 Australia Day Honours for his service as Assistant Chief of the Defence Force Staff. Later that year he was promoted to lieutenant general and appointed Chief of the General Staff – the professional head of the Australian Army.

In 1987, Gration was appointed Chief of the Defence Force and promoted to general. In the Australia Day Honours of 1988 he was appointed a Companion of the Order of Australia. In October 1992 Gration visited Sweden and Jämtland Wing (F 4) where he studied the Swedish Air Force's next airborne surveillance radar system, the FSR-890. Following forty-four years of service, Gration retired from the Australian Army and active military service in 1993.

== Retirement ==
Since his retirement from the army, Gration has held various senior positions in companies and charities, including Chairman of the Civil Aviation Authority, Chairman of the Council of the Australian War Memorial, Chairman of the Management Committee of Transfield Defence Systems, Chairman of the Advisory Board of the Australian Defence College, Director of Tenix Pty Ltd, Chairman of Tenix Toll Defence Logistics Pty Ltd, Founding Chairman of the General Sir John Monash Foundation, and National President of Toc H.

In 1993 Gration was awarded an honorary Doctor of Science from the University of New South Wales. During 1994–1995, Gration served as a consultant to the Department of the Prime Minister and Cabinet and had primary responsibility for negotiation of a security agreement with Indonesia. During this time, he was appointed Honorary Colonel of the Melbourne University Regiment, and made Representative Colonel Commandant of the Royal Australian Engineers during 2000.

Since the 2003 Invasion of Iraq, Gration has been open in his criticism of Australia's involvement in the war. In an article he wrote for The Age, Gration declared: "... there are insufficient grounds for war, which is unnecessary and may lead to unpredictable and potentially disastrous consequences. It is not in Australia's interests to take part in such a war." In April 2005 he was awarded the inaugural Peace Prize from the Australian Medical Association for the Prevention of War for his "outspoken criticism".

Married with two sons, Gration is an Honorary Fellow of the Institution of Engineers, Australia, and a Fellow of the Australian Academy of Technological Sciences and Engineering. His brother, Air Marshal Barry Gration, was Chief of the Air Staff of the Royal Australian Air Force from 1992 until 1994.

Military offices
Preceded by General Sir Phillip Bennett	Chief of the Defence Force; 1987–1993	Succeeded by Admiral Alan Beaumont
Preceded by Lieutenant General Sir Phillip Bennett	Chief of the General Staff; 1984–1987	Succeeded by Lieutenant General Lawrence O'Donnell
