= Hector Edgar =

Australian general

- Born: 31 October 1903; Wedderburn, Victoria
- Died: 1978 (aged 74–75); Balwyn, Victoria
- Relatives: Brigadier Cedric Edgar (brother)
- Military career
- Allegiance: Australia
- Branch: Australian Army
- Service years: 1920–1963
- Rank: Lieutenant General
- Commands: Eastern Command (1960–63); Southern Command (1958–60); Deputy Chief of the General Staff (1954–58); Australian Staff College (1951–53); Long Range Weapons Establishment (c.1946–48)
- Conflicts: Second World War; New Guinea campaign; Bougainville campaign
- Awards: Companion of the Order of the Bath; Commander of the Order of the British Empire

Lieutenant General Hector Geoffrey Edgar, CB, CBE (31 October 1903 – 1978) was a senior officer in the Australian Army. He graduated from the Royal Military College, Duntroon in 1923, and occupied a series of staff positions prior to and during the Second World War. Involved in the planning for the Long Range Weapons Establishment in the late 1940s, he served as Deputy Chief of the General Staff (1954–58), General Officer Commanding (GOC) Southern Command (1958–60), and GOC Eastern Command (1960–63).

== Early life ==
Hector Geoffrey Edgar was born in Wedderburn, Victoria, on 31 October 1903 to Thomas George Edgar and his second wife Bessie (née Trotman). Cedric Edgar was an elder brother. Edgar was educated in Victoria and New South Wales, and was a member of the Cadets from 1917. He was accepted into the Royal Military College, Duntroon as an officer cadet commencing February 1920.

== Military career ==
On graduating from Duntroon, Edgar was commissioned a lieutenant in the Australian Army on 13 December 1923. He was seconded to the Queen's Bays (2nd Dragoon Guards) in India for a period in the 1920s, and was promoted captain on 13 December 1931. In 1936, he graduated from the Royal Military College of Science in Woolwich, United Kingdom, and returned to Australia as Proof and Experimental Officer seconded to the Munitions and Supply Board from 11 January 1937. He remained seconded until 14 January 1941 and was made temporary lieutenant colonel the following day, having been promoted major on 13 December 1939.

Edgar was seconded to the Second Australian Imperial Force from 17 July 1942 for active service during the Second World War and, from 1943 to 1944, served with Allied Land Headquarters, South West Pacific Area. He was then appointed General Staff Officer Grade 1 to the 3rd Australian Division. In this post he was the division's chief of staff, responsible for administration and planning during the formation's service in New Guinea, withdrawal to Australia for a period of leave and reorganisation, and redeployment to the Solomon Islands from November 1944 to take part in the Bougainville Campaign. He relinquished the position to Lieutenant Colonel Frank Hassett in March 1945.

While remaining a substantive lieutenant colonel, Edgar was granted the temporary rank of brigadier from 6 February 1946. That year, he was involved in planning the Long Range Weapons Establishment at Woomera, South Australia, and was appointed the first superintendent of the site. He was promoted substantive colonel on 18 October 1948. This was followed by a posting as Deputy Director of Staff Duties at Army Headquarters. He relinquished the appointment on 2 November 1949 and was sent to London to attend the 1950 course at the Imperial Defence College. On his return to Australia, Edgar was appointed Director of Personal Services on 21 December 1950 and, on 17 September 1951, was reconfirmed as a temporary brigadier and appointed to command the Australian Staff College. He returned to Army Headquarters as Director of Staff Duties from 31 August 1953, and was promoted substantive brigadier on 23 November that year.

Edgar was promoted temporary major general on 30 October 1954 (substantive 2 August 1956) and posted as Deputy Chief of the General Staff. He was appointed a Commander of the Order of the British Empire in the 1955 Birthday Honours. From 30 June 1956 he was accorded status as Fifth Military Member of the Military Board, the governing body of the Australian Army, when membership was extended to include the position of Deputy Chief. Promoted lieutenant general, Edgar was appointed General Officer Commanding (GOC) Southern Command on 23 March 1958. He served in this position for two years, before assuming the post of GOC Eastern Command from 30 May 1960. He was appointed a Companion of the Order of the Bath four days later in the 1960 Birthday Honours.

== Later life ==
Edgar left the Australian Army after 43 years of service on 1 November 1963, and was succeeded as GOC Eastern Command by Major General Thomas Daly. He retired to Melbourne, where he died in 1978.

Military offices
Preceded by Lieutenant General Reg Pollard	General Officer Commanding Eastern Command; 1960–1963	Succeeded by Major General Thomas Daly
Preceded by Major General Ragnar Garrett	General Officer Commanding Southern Command; 1958–1960	Succeeded by Major General Lawrence Canet
Preceded by Major General Lindley Barham	Deputy Chief of the General Staff; 1954–1958	Succeeded by Major General Ian Murodch
