= Harry Chauvel =

Australian army officer (1865–1945)

Sir Harry Chauvel
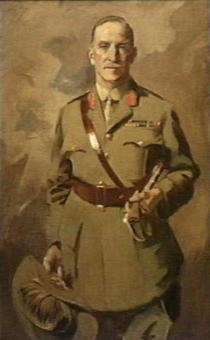
- Lieutenant General Sir Harry Chauvel (1919)
- Born: 16 April 1865; Tabulam, New South Wales
- Died: 4 March 1945 (aged 79); Melbourne, Victoria
- Burial place: Springvale Botanical Cemetery
- Military career
- Allegiance: Queensland; Australia
- Branch: Queensland Defence Force; Australian Army
- Service years: 1884–1930; 1940–1945
- Rank: General
- Commands: Volunteer Defence Corps (1940–45); Chief of the General Staff (1923–30); Desert Mounted Corps (1917–19); Desert Column (1917); Anzac Mounted Division (1916); 1st Division (1915–16); New Zealand and Australian Division (1915); 1st Light Horse Brigade (1914–15)
- Conflicts: Second Boer War; Siege of Kimberley; Battle of Diamond Hill; First World War; Gallipoli Campaign; Landing at Anzac Cove; Battle of Sari Bair; Battle of the Nek; Battle of Chunuk Bair; Sinai and Palestine Campaign; Battle of Romani; Battle of Magdhaba; First Battle of Gaza; Battle of Beersheba; Battle of Sharon; Capture of Damascus; Pursuit to Haritan; Second World War
- Awards: Knight Grand Cross of the Order of St Michael and St George; Knight Commander of the Order of the Bath; Mentioned in Despatches (11); Grand Officer of the Order of the Nile (Egypt); Croix de guerre (France)

General Sir Henry George Chauvel, GCMG, KCB (16 April 1865 – 4 March 1945) was a senior officer of the Australian Imperial Force who fought at Gallipoli and during the Sinai and Palestine Campaign in the Middle Eastern theatre of the First World War. He was the first Australian to attain the rank of lieutenant general and later general, and the first to lead a corps. As commander of the Desert Mounted Corps, he was responsible for one of the most decisive victories and fastest pursuits in military history.

The son of a grazier, Chauvel was commissioned as a second lieutenant in the Upper Clarence Light Horse, a unit organised by his father, in 1886. After the family moved to Queensland he was commissioned as a second lieutenant in the Queensland Mounted Infantry in 1890, and saw service during the 1891 Australian shearers' strike. He became a regular officer in 1896, and went to the United Kingdom as part of the Queensland contingent for the 1897 Diamond Jubilee of Queen Victoria. In 1899 he commanded one of two companies of Queensland Mounted Infantry that were Queensland's initial contribution to the Boer War. After the war, he was closely involved with the training of the Australian Light Horse.

Promoted to colonel in 1913, Chauvel became the Australian representative on the Imperial General Staff but the First World War broke out while he was still en route to the United Kingdom. Chauvel arranged for the Australian Imperial Force to be diverted to Egypt, where he joined his new command, the 1st Light Horse Brigade, in December. In May 1915, it was sent dismounted to Gallipoli, where Chauvel assumed responsibility for some of the most dangerous parts of the line. He took charge of the 1st Division that November. In March 1916, Chauvel became commander of the Anzac Mounted Division, gaining victories in the Battle of Romani in August and the Battle of Magdhaba in December, and nearly winning the First Battle of Gaza in March 1917. The following month, he took over the Desert Column, later known as the Desert Mounted Corps, thereby becoming the first Australian to command a corps, and the first to reach the rank of lieutenant general. At Beersheba in October 1917, his light horse captured the town and its vital water supply in one of history's last great cavalry charges. By September 1918, Chauvel was able to effect a secret redeployment of three of his mounted divisions and launch a surprise attack on the enemy that won the Battle of Megiddo. He followed up this victory with one of the fastest pursuits in military history.

In 1919, Chauvel was appointed Inspector General, the Army's most senior post. He was forced to maintain an increasingly hollow structure by politicians intent on cutting expenditure. He was concurrently Chief of the General Staff from 1923 until his retirement in 1930. In November 1929, he became the first Australian to be promoted to the rank of general. During the Second World War, he was recalled to duty as Inspector in Chief of the Volunteer Defence Corps.

== Early life ==
Henry George Chauvel was born in Tabulam, New South Wales, on 16 April 1865, the second child of a grazier, Charles Henry Edward Chauvel, and his wife Fanny Ada Mary, née James; from an early age he was known as "Harry". By 1884, Charles Henry Chauvel's station at Tabulam consisted of 96,000 acres (39,000 ha), on which he raised 12,000 head of cattle and 320 horses.

Harry was educated at Mr Belcher's School near Goulburn, before going to Sydney Grammar School from 1874 to 1880, and Toowoomba Grammar School from 1881 to 1882. While at Sydney Grammar, Harry served in the school cadet unit, rising to the rank of lance corporal. In 1886, Charles Henry was given permission to raise two troops of cavalry. On 14 March 1886, he was commissioned as a captain in the Upper Clarence Light Horse, with his sons Arthur and Harry becoming second lieutenants, while his two younger sons became troopers. The unit escorted Lord Carrington, Governor of New South Wales, when he formally opened the railway at Tenterfield in 1886.

Following a series of severe droughts in northern New South Wales, Charles Henry Chauvel sold his property at Tabulam in 1888 for £50,000. After paying his debts, he bought a much smaller 12,000-acre (4,900 ha) property at Canning Downs on the Darling Downs in Queensland. In 1889, Harry Chauvel embarked on a solo tour of Europe, visiting Venice, Rome, Florence, Paris and London. While in the United Kingdom, he watched military manoeuvres near Aldershot in the presence of Emperor Wilhelm II of Germany. Harry resigned his commission in the New South Wales Military Forces when he moved to Queensland, but on 9 January 1890 he was commissioned as a second lieutenant in the Queensland Mounted Infantry. After completing his examinations for the rank, he was confirmed as lieutenant in June 1890.

Chauvel's unit was called up in March 1891 during the shearers' strike that had begun earlier that year. Leading his troops and a small detachment of Queensland Police, Chauvel was given the task of escorting a party of strikebreakers to a station north of Charleville. Near Oakwood, Chauvel's troops were confronted by a crowd of around two hundred mounted sheep shearers. When the inspector in charge of the police detachment arrested four of the shearers who were wanted by the police, the crowd became agitated, but Chauvel managed to disperse the crowd peacefully, and bring his charges safely to their destination. During the 1894 Australian shearers' strike, the Queensland government enrolled special constables rather than calling up the militia. Chauvel was appointed a temporary sub-inspector in Clermont, and later the district around Longreach.

On 9 September 1896, Chauvel transferred to the Queensland Permanent Military Forces with the rank of captain in the Moreton Regiment. He was sent to the United Kingdom with the Queensland contingent for the Diamond Jubilee of Queen Victoria. Sporting the emu feathers worn by Queensland units, he marched with the colonial troops through London behind Lord Roberts on 21 June 1897. Chauvel qualified at the School of Musketry at Hythe, Kent, and served on exchange with the 3rd Battalion, King's Royal Rifle Corps and 2nd Battalion, Royal Berkshire Regiment at Aldershot. On returning to Australia, he became a staff officer at headquarters, Queensland Defence Force.

== Boer War ==
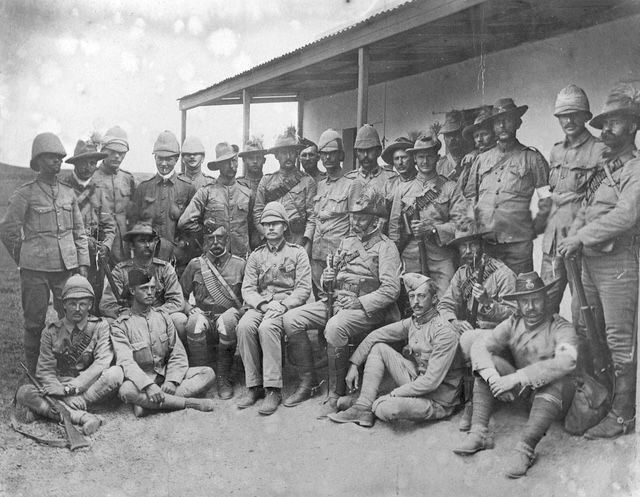
Officers of the Queensland Mounted Infantry. Chauvel is squatting in the front row, second from the right, holding a rifle.

In July 1899, the Premier of Queensland, James Dickson, offered a contingent of troops for service in South Africa in the event of war between the British Empire, and the Transvaal Republic and Orange Free State. For a time Chauvel served as an enrolment officer, signing up volunteers from the Darling Downs. The Boer War broke out in October 1899, and Chauvel was given command of one of two companies of Queensland Mounted Infantry that departed Brisbane on 1 November 1899. They disembarked at Cape Town on 14 December and joined the Imperial force under Lord Methuen at the Orange River. The Queensland Mounted Infantry's first fighting was in an action at Sunnyside on 1 January 1900 alongside the infantry of the Royal Canadian Regiment. In February, the Queensland Mounted Infantry became part of Major General John French's Cavalry Division. After a strenuous march, the Cavalry Division relieved the siege of Kimberley on 15 February.

In the reorganisation that followed, the Queensland Mounted Infantry became part of Major General Edward Hutton's 1st Mounted Infantry Brigade, along with the Canadian and New Zealand mounted units. Chauvel distinguished himself fighting alongside a group of New Zealanders and capturing a Maxim gun. The Queensland Mounted Infantry participated in the capture of Pretoria and the Battle of Diamond Hill. Chauvel was given a mixed force of British, Australian, Canadian and New Zealand mounted troops that became known as "Chauvel's Mounted Infantry", with Victor Sellheim as his chief of staff. Initially, Chauvel was given the mission of escorting 10,000 head of cattle to Belfast, Mpumalanga to supply the troops in the eastern Transvaal. However, his force was diverted by local commanders, who assigned it to burning homesteads sheltering Boer commandos and attacking Boer units. The Queensland Mounted Infantry embarked for Australia on 13 December 1900. They reached Brisbane on 17 January 1901 and the regiment was disbanded there on 23 January. For his part in the fighting, Chauvel was mentioned in despatches, and appointed a Companion of the Order of St Michael and St George (CMG).

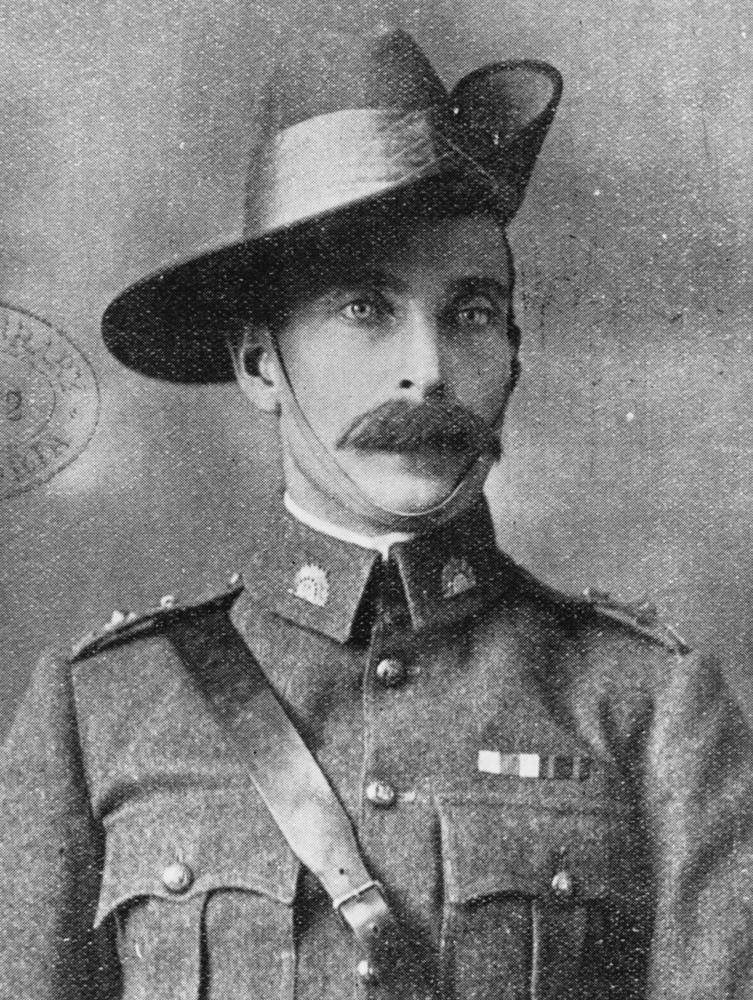
Lieutenant Colonel H. G. Chauvel, 31 May 1902

On 1 January 1901, the colonies of Australia federated to form the Commonwealth of Australia. When Chauvel returned to Australia on 17 January, he found that during his absence he had become an officer in the newly formed Australian Army. A force of 14,000 troops was assembled for the opening of the first Federal Parliament on 9 May 1901 in Melbourne; Chauvel was selected as brigade major of the mounted contingent, his first Federal posting. He became Staff Officer, Northern Military District, based at Townsville, Queensland, in July. In 1902, Chauvel was appointed to command of the 7th Commonwealth Light Horse, a unit newly raised for service in South Africa, with the local rank of lieutenant colonel. Departing from Brisbane on 17 May 1902, the 7th Commonwealth Light Horse arrived at Durban on 22 June, three weeks after the war ended. It therefore re-embarked for Brisbane, where it was disbanded. Chauvel remained in South Africa for a few weeks in order to tour the battlefields. On returning to Australia he became Staff Officer, Northern Military District once more. He was promoted to the brevet rank of lieutenant colonel in December 1902.

In 1903, Hutton, now General Officer Commanding Australian Military Forces, sent Chauvel to South Australia to organise the light horse regiments there. On returning to Queensland in 1904, he became acting Chief Staff Officer Queensland, based in Brisbane. He was promoted to the substantive rank of lieutenant colonel in December 1909, but his ambition to become the Australian representative on the Imperial General Staff in London was blocked by Hutton's successor Major General Charles Hoad. Based on his experiences in South Africa, Chauvel propounded ideas on the nature of mounted infantry. He recommended that Australian troops improve their discipline in the field, called for stronger leadership from officers, and emphasised the need for better organisation for supply and for timely and efficient medical evacuation.

Chauvel knew Keith Jopp of Newmarket, Queensland even before the Boer War, and while stationed in Brisbane, Chauvel and Major Brudenell White played tennis at the Jopps' place with their daughters Dora and Sibyl. Chauvel became engaged to Sibyl in January 1906, and they were married on 16 June 1906 at All Saints Anglican Church, Brisbane. Their union ultimately produced two sons and two daughters. That year Chauvel also sold the property at Canning Downs South. In the shuffle of senior positions that followed Hoad's death in 1911, Chauvel was appointed to the Military Board in Melbourne as Adjutant General. As such, Chauvel was involved in the implementation of the Universal Training Scheme. Chauvel was particularly involved with the training of the light horse. "When the next war comes," White predicted, "it will only need an Ashby or a J.E.B. Stuart to make their name immortal."

== First World War ==
=== War Office ===
Chauvel was promoted to colonel in 1913. On 3 July 1914, he sailed for England with his wife and three children to replace Colonel James Gordon Legge as the Australian representative on the Imperial General Staff. While he was still travelling, the First World War broke out. On reporting for duty at the War Office in mid-August 1914, Chauvel was given a cable directing him to assume command of the 1st Light Horse Brigade of the Australian Imperial Force (AIF) when it arrived in the United Kingdom. Chauvel became concerned with slow progress on construction of the AIF's proposed quarters on the Salisbury Plain. He made frequent visits to the site and had a Royal Australian Engineers officer, Major Cecil Henry Foott, appointed to the local staff to safeguard Australian interests. Convinced that the huts would not be ready on time, and that Australian troops would therefore have to spend a winter on Salisbury Plain under canvas, Chauvel persuaded the High Commissioner for Australia in London, former Prime Minister Sir George Reid, to approach Lord Kitchener with an alternate plan of diverting the AIF to Egypt, which was done. Accompanied by Major Thomas Blamey, Chauvel sailed for Egypt on the ocean liner SS Mooltan on 28 November 1914, arriving at Port Said on 10 December 1914.

=== Gallipoli ===
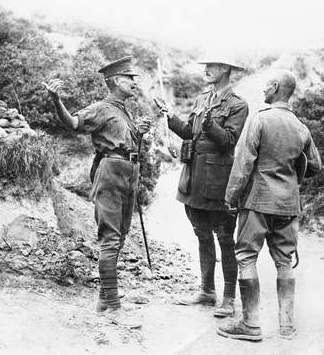
Alexander Godley (centre) confers with fellow generals Harry Chauvel (left) and William Birdwood, Gallipoli, 1915.

Chauvel began training his brigade upon arrival in Egypt. He was noted for insisting on high standards of dress and bearing from his troops. The 1st Light Horse Brigade became part of Major General Alexander Godley's New Zealand and Australian Division, along with the 4th Infantry Brigade, the New Zealand Infantry Brigade and New Zealand Mounted Rifles Brigade. When the rest of the Australian and New Zealand Army Corps departed for Anzac Cove on 25 April 1915, the mounted brigades remained in Egypt – the Gallipoli Peninsula being unsuited to mounted operations. Following heavy casualties in the early days of the Gallipoli Campaign, however, the light horse were called upon to provide 1,000 reinforcements. The British commander in Egypt, Lieutenant General Sir John Maxwell, elected instead to ship the mounted brigades to Anzac Cove intact.

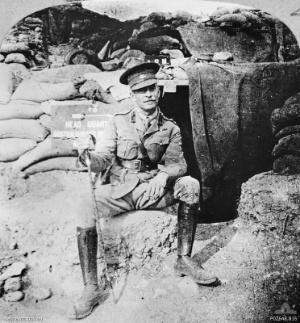
Brigadier General H. G. Chauvel outside his headquarters at Monash Valley

Chauvel arrived on 12 May 1915 and took over the critical sector, which included Pope's Hill and Quinn's, Courtney's and Steele's Posts, from Colonel John Monash. Open to Turkish observation on two sides, these four advanced posts at the top of Monash Valley were the linchpin of the defence. Chauvel reorganised the defence, appointing permanent commanders for the posts. He also formed special sniper groups who eventually managed to suppress the Turkish snipers, making it safe even for mule trains to move up Monash Valley. Chauvel's brigade soon found itself under heavy pressure from the Turks. On 29 May 1915, the Turks fired a mine under Quinn's Post and broke into it. The permanent commander of the post, Lieutenant Colonel J. H. Cannan was absent on leave and the acting commander, Lieutenant Colonel G. J. Burnage was wounded in the fighting. Chauvel responded by bringing up reserves and appointing a temporary post commander, Lieutenant Colonel H. Pope, with orders to drive the Turks out at all costs. Major S. C. E. Herring was miraculously able to charge across the open practically unscathed, his attack having coincided with a Turkish one on another part of the post so that the Turkish machine gunners could not shoot without hitting their own men. There were in fact only about seventeen Turks in the post, who eventually surrendered. Chauvel's decision may have been the wrong one, but it was decisive; he was also lucky. For this action, he was mentioned in despatches.

On 9 July 1915, Chauvel was promoted to brigadier general, back-dated to when he assumed command of the 1st Light Horse Brigade on 10 December 1914. He spent six weeks in Egypt, in June and July, in hospital with pleurisy, but returned in time for the August offensive, for which he was mentioned in despatches. Chauvel was acting commander of the New Zealand and Australian Division for short periods in September and October in Godley's absence. Then on 6 November 1915, he became commander of the 1st Division, and was promoted to temporary major general. He commanded this division through the final phase of the Gallipoli campaign, the evacuation, and the reorganisation in Egypt in February and March 1916. For his part in the evacuation, he was mentioned in despatches. His role in the campaign as a whole was recognised by his appointment as a Companion of the Order of the Bath.

=== Sinai ===
==== Anzac Mounted Division ====
Romani defences at nightfall 3 August 1916: deployments of the 52nd (Lowland) Division's infantry brigades in a line of redoubts 1 to 11 and 21 to 23, with the 1st and 2nd Light Horse Brigades extending the line of defence towards Hod el Enna

Chauvel assumed command of the newly formed Anzac Mounted Division on 16 March 1916, the day after it relieved the 1st Division on the Suez Canal defences. Chauvel was again mentioned in despatches for his part in the defence of the Canal. His division was committed to No. 3 Section of the Suez Canal Defences, the northern part of the Canal, under Major General Herbert Lawrence. Arrangements were far from ideal. The mounted troops were parcelled out so that only two brigades of the Anzac Mounted Division remained under Chauvel's command. The 3rd Light Horse Brigade had been placed under No. 2 Section by General Sir Archibald Murray GOC Egyptian Expeditionary Force (EEF). Lawrence was too far away to control the battle, especially once the telephone lines were cut. Murray, in Ismailia, was even further back.

Chauvel was no hard-riding gambler against odds. Like Alva, he could on occasion ignore the ardent enthusiasm of his officers and bide his time. Always cool, and looking far enough ahead to see the importance of any particular fight in its proper relation to the war as a whole, he was brave enough to break off an engagement if it promised victory only at what he considered an excessive cost to his men and horses. He fought to win, but not at any price. He sought victory on his own terms. He always retained, even in heated moments of battle, when leaders are often careless of life, a very rare concern for the lives of his men and his horses.

— Henry Gullett official Australian historian

For the Battle of Romani, Chauvel chose his ground carefully, reconnoitring it from the ground and the air, and selecting both forward and fall back positions. His luck held; the German commander – Friedrich Kreß von Kressenstein – selected the same position as the forming up area for his attack in August 1916. Under great pressure, Chauvel maintained his position until Brigadier-General Edward Chaytor's New Zealand Mounted Rifles Brigade arrived after being released by Lawrence. The counter-attack that Chauvel had been calling for all day did not materialise until dusk. At Katia and again at Bir el Abd, Chauvel attempted to sweep around the Turkish flank but wound up making frontal attacks on the Turkish rearguard and was beaten off by determined counter-attacks and artillery fire against the 3rd Light Horse Brigade. Despite killing 1,250 Turks and taking over 4,000 prisoners, Chauvel was criticised for his failure to rout and destroy the Turks. However, for the Australian and New Zealand horsemen, who suffered over 900 of the 1,130 British casualties, it was a clear-cut victory, their first decisive win and the turning point of the campaign. Later, Chauvel realised that Romani was the first decisive British victory of the war outside West Africa Campaign.

In his report to the War Office on the battle, Murray passed lightly over the part played by the Anzac Mounted Division. The majority of awards for the Battle of Romani went to British troops, including a generous number to officers of Murray's staff. Lawrence was made a Knight Commander of the Order of the Bath, but Chauvel, having already been made a Companion of the Order of St Michael and St George for South Africa and Companion of the Order of the Bath for Gallipoli, was recommended for a lesser award, which he refused. In view of this, Murray decided that Chauvel should receive no award at all, and he was merely mentioned in despatches.

==== Desert Column ====
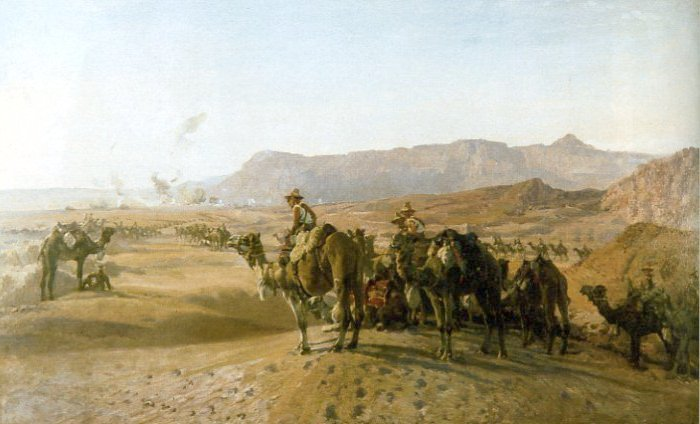
Mounted troops of the Imperial Camel Corps Brigade with the Egyptian town of Magdhaba in the distance, 23 December 1916

In October 1916 Major General Sir Charles Macpherson Dobell, a Canadian officer with broad experience in fighting colonial wars took over command of Eastern Force. Its advanced troops – including Chauvel's Anzac Mounted Division – became part of the newly formed Desert Column under Major-General Sir Philip Chetwode, a British cavalry baronet. In the Battle of Magdhaba in December 1916, Chauvel therefore was answerable to the newly arrived Chetwode, instead of the distant commanders on the Canal. His intelligence on enemy dispositions was considerably better thanks to the work of the aviators of No. 5 Wing, which consisted of No. 14 Squadron, Royal Flying Corps and No. 1 Squadron, Australian Flying Corps. However, he had only limited time to capture the position and its water supply, and when the issue was in doubt Chauvel ordered a withdrawal. The order was ignored by Brigadier-General Charles Frederick Cox of the 1st Light Horse Brigade, whose troops carried the position, and was cancelled by Chetwode. Despite his premature withdrawal order, it was Chauvel's plan of attack that won the battle. "Chauvel's leadership," wrote Henry Gullett, "was distinguished by the rapidity with which he summed up the very obscure Turkish position in the early morning, and by his judgement and characteristic patience in keeping so much of his force in reserve until the fight developed sufficiently to ensure its most profitable employment."

Chauvel gained another important success in the Battle of Rafa in January 1917. In many ways, the battle was similar to Magdhaba, but the Turkish position was stronger and the threat of its reinforcement was greater. Once again, the availability of water was a crucial feature of the battle. This time it was Chetwode who decided to call off the battle, with Chauvel's concurrence, but once again the troops carried the day. The victories at Magdhaba and Rafah changed Murray's mind about awarding Chauvel a knighthood and in January 1917 Chauvel was appointed a Knight Commander of the Order of St Michael and St George. In July, he was mentioned in despatches for these operations.

However, Chauvel continued to be concerned about the lack of recognition for Australian and New Zealand troops and on 28 September 1917 wrote:

The point is now that, during the period covered by Sir Archibald's Despatch of 1–3–17, the Australia and New Zealand Troops well know that, with the exception of the 5th Mounted Brigade and some Yeomanry Companies of the I.C.C., they were absolutely the only troops engaged with the enemy on this front and yet they see that they have again got a very small portion indeed of the hundreds of Honours and Rewards (including mentions in Despatches) that have been granted. My Lists when commanding the A. & N.Z. Mounted Division, were modest ones under all the circumstances and in that perhaps I am partly to blame but, as you will see by attached list, a good many of my recommendations were cut out and in some cases those recommended for decorations were not even mentioned in Despatches. I am well aware that it is difficult to do anything now to right this, but consider that the Commander–in–Chief [Allenby] should know that there is a great deal of bitterness over it.

— Chauvel to EEF General Staff

Chauvel appended 32 names of soldiers he recommended for awards that had been ignored. Two New Zealanders recommended for a Bar to their Distinguished Service Orders (DSO) were not even mentioned in despatches and an outstanding Australian regimental commander recommended for the CMG was also not even mentioned in despatches, while a brigade commander and a staff officer Chauvel recommended for DSOs received mentions.

=== Palestine ===
In January 1917, a second mounted division – the Imperial Mounted Division – was formed from the 3rd and 4th Light Horse Brigades and the British 5th and 6th Yeomanry Brigades. A British regular army officer fresh from experience in the Senussi Campaign, Major General Sir H. W. Hodgson, was appointed to command, with an all-British staff. The deliberate mixing of Australian and Imperial troops was done with Chauvel's approval but was contrary to the policy of the Australian Government, which soon registered its displeasure, sending Brigadier General Sir Robert Anderson to Cairo to discuss the matter frankly with Chauvel and his superiors. As a result, the Imperial Mounted Division was renamed the Australian Mounted Division.

In the First Battle of Gaza in March 1917, Chauvel's mission was similar to Rafa and Magdhaba, but on a larger scale. He enveloped the Turkish position at Gaza while the British 53rd (Welsh) Infantry Division and 54th (East Anglian) Infantry Division attempted to capture it. When this failed, Chetwode ordered Chauvel to attempt to capture Gaza from the rear. Chauvel successfully improvised a late afternoon assault on Gaza that captured the town despite the barriers of high cactus hedges and fierce enemy opposition, entering it after dark, only to have an out-of-touch Dobell order the mounted troops to withdraw, despite Chauvel's protests. This time his brigadiers at the front, Generals Ryrie and Chaytor, although they believed that Gaza could be held, felt compelled to obey, as they could not see the whole battle. All guns, including captured ones were hauled away, as were all unwounded prisoners, the wounded and even the dead. Chauvel ensured that wounded Turkish prisoners that were unfit to make the march to Deir al-Balah were each left with a full water bottle.

Dobell launched the Second Battle of Gaza in April 1917 with a full scale frontal assault supported by naval gunfire, tanks and poison gas. It ended even more unsatisfactorily, and Dobell was relieved of command of Eastern Force on 19 April. His place was taken by Chetwode, while Chauvel took over the Desert Column, thereby becoming the first Australian to reach the rank of lieutenant general. Command of the Anzac Mounted Division passed to Chaytor. In June, during the Stalemate in Southern Palestine, General Sir Edmund Allenby took over the EEF from Murray. Allenby moved his headquarters to Palestine and re-organised his command along more regular lines. Eastern Force was abolished and two corps headquarters were formed, XX Corps under Chetwode and XXI Corps under Lieutenant General Edward Bulfin. The three corps commanders were professional soldiers, none of whom had graduated from a military college or a staff college, they had all been commissioned from the militia or volunteers.

Two weeks before Allenby arrived, Chauvel attended an awards ceremony:

Mick Bruxner ... was the first recipient and you should have seen his face when he realised he was going to be kissed ... Irwin of the 1st Regiment is a very tall man and had to have his head pulled down and they ... say that he kissed the old General back. I cannot say as I was having such a job keeping my countenance that I was pretending to read something I had in my hand."

— Chauvel letter to his wife 12 June 1917

==== Desert Mounted Corps ====
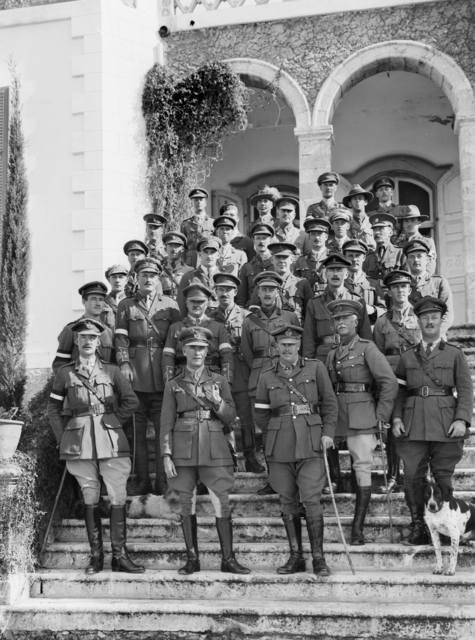
Lieutenant General Sir Harry Chauvel with his Desert Mounted Corps Headquarters staff, in front of his HQ building, now Rehovot, Israel; photo by Frank Hurley

When Chauvel learned that the Desert Column was to be renamed the 2nd Cavalry Corps he requested Desert Mounted Corps. The corps consisted of the Anzac Mounted Division, the Australian Mounted Division, the newly formed Yeomanry Mounted Division and the Imperial Camel Corps Brigade.

Although some British thought that Allenby should replace Chauvel with a British officer, Allenby retained him in command. However he overrode Chauvel's own preference to appoint a Royal Horse Guards officer, Brigadier General Richard Howard-Vyse, known as "Wombat", as Chauvel's chief of staff. Chauvel thus, on 2 August 1917, became the first Australian to permanently command a corps. A "brass-bound brigadier" was quoted as saying, "Fancy giving the command of the biggest mounted force in the world's history to an Australian." On being told of the appointments, in a letter dated 12 August 1917 Chetwode wrote to congratulate Chauvel, "I cannot say how much I envy you the command of the largest body of mounted men ever under one hand – it is my own trade – but Fate has willed it otherwise." (Note: Murat's Reserve Cavalry in 1805 had been 22,000 while Bessieres' Reserve Cavalry in 1809 had been 29,000, both larger than Chauvel's 20,000. Hill notes the war establishment of a mounted division in July 1917 was 7,991, so Chauvel would have commanded about 24,000. He also notes the reference to "Forty Thousand Horsemen" in the name of a film directed by Charles Chauvel, (Chauvel's nephew) was a myth. [Hill 1978 pp. 119–20, note]) At Romani Chauvel had been a battleground commander who led from the front while Chetwode, relying on the phone had been deciding to retreat at the victory at Rafa. Chetwode's "arms length" style of command also impacted the First Battle of Gaza.

In the Battle of Beersheba in October 1917, it was again Chauvel and his Desert Mounted Corps that had the critical role. Chetwode believed that the EEF did not have the resources to defeat the Turks in their fixed positions so he planned to drive the Turks from them by turning the enemy flank at Beersheba, in a waterless area on the flank of the enemy line. The Desert Mounted Corps would have a long overnight approach over waterless desert and would have to capture the town with its wells intact or be forced to retreat. The Battle of Beersheba went right down to the line, but the mission was accomplished, albeit not without a mounted infantry bayonet charge by the 4th Light Horse Brigade – the last of history's great cavalry charges – to capture the town and its vital water supply. Few battles have been won in such spectacular fashion. For this decisive victory, and the subsequent capture of Jerusalem, Chauvel was mentioned in despatches twice more, and appointed a Knight Commander of the Order of the Bath in the 1918 New Year Honours List.

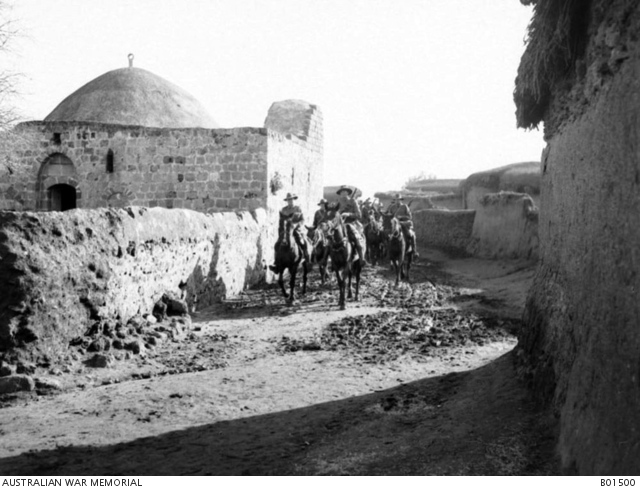
Entry to "New Deiran", the Jewish colony Rehovot, through the village of Zernukah; photo by Frank Hurley

Chauvel, however, was still disappointed with the failure to destroy the Turkish army. The Turks had fought hard, forcing the commitment of the Desert Mounted Corps in heavy action before the moment for a sweeping pursuit came. When it did, the men and horses were too tired and could not summon the required energy. In February 1918, the EEF began a series of operations across the Jordan. Allenby soon found his British troops diverted to France, to be replaced by two Indian cavalry divisions, and the Australian Mounted Division faced a similar fate for a time. In the meantime, during the second Transjordan operations Chauvel faced great difficulties with the terrain, the weather and a tenacious enemy; the campaign was not a success. The Desert Mounted Corps found itself fighting outnumbered, with Turkish reinforcements closing in from all sides. Chauvel was forced to withdraw to the West Bank of the Jordan. Subsequently, the 5th Yeomanry Mounted Brigade was disbanded and Chauvel replaced it with the 5th Light Horse Brigade, formed from the Australian and New Zealand components of the now disbanded Imperial Camel Corps Brigade, and a composite French cavalry regiment of Spahis and Chasseurs d'Afrique.

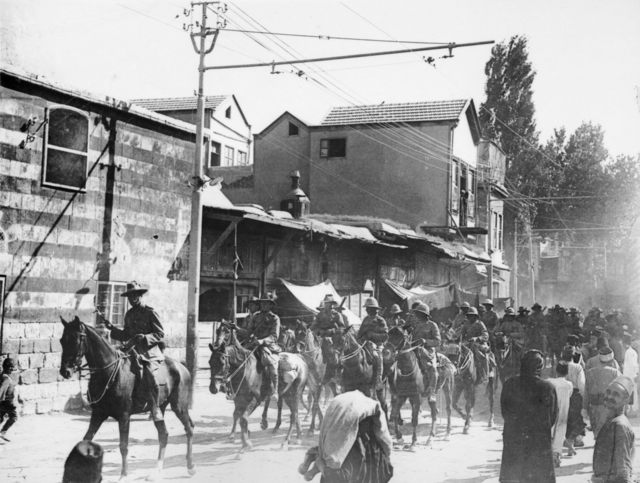
Lieutenant General Sir Harry Chauvel, Commander in Chief, Desert Mounted Corps leading his troops through Damascus on 2 October 1918 the day after his corps captured the city

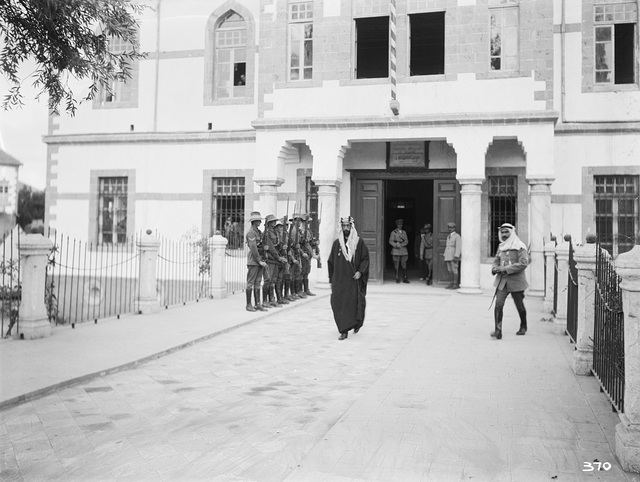
Prince Feisal leaving Chauvel's Desert Mounted Corps Headquarters in Damascus

In September 1918, Chauvel was able to effect a secret redeployment of two of his mounted divisions. Allenby launched a surprise attack on the enemy and won the Battle of Megiddo. He then followed up this victory with one of the fastest pursuits in military history – 167 km in only three days. This time he succeeded in destroying the Turkish army. The Desert Mounted Corps moved across the Golan Heights and captured Damascus on 1 October. Between 19 September and 2 October, the Australian Mounted Division lost 21 killed and 71 wounded, and captured 31,335 Turkish prisoners. To restore calm in the city, Chauvel ordered a show of force. Lieutenant Colonel T. E. Lawrence later lampooned this as a "triumphal entry" but it was actually a shrewd political stroke, freeing Chauvel's forces to advance another 300 km to Aleppo, which was captured on 25 October. Five days later, Turkey surrendered. For this victory, Chauvel was again mentioned in despatches.

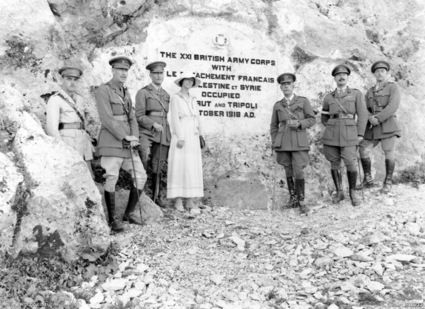
General Sir Harry and Lady Chauvel (third and fourth from left) at the Commemorative stela of Nahr el-Kalb, near the stone tablet recording the occupation of Beirut and Tripoli

Chauvel was obliged to remain in the Middle East due to the situation in Syria and the Egyptian Rebellion, although he was able to have Lady Chauvel join him there in January 1919. By April, the situation had calmed and Chauvel was able to hand over command of the AIF in the Middle East to Ryrie. Chauvel and Lady Chauvel then headed for London on the RMS Malwa. They arrived in time for him to lead Australian troops on a victory march through the city on 3 May. Soon after, he was hospitalised at the 3rd London General Hospital at Wandsworth with appendicitis. The whole Chauvel family was able to sail for home on the transport HMAT Demosthenes on 26 July 1919. For his services as commander of the Desert Mounted Corps, Chauvel was created a Knight Grand Cross of the Order of St Michael and St George in June 1919, was awarded the French Croix de Guerre avec Palme by the President of France and the Order of the Nile (2nd Class) by the Sultan of Egypt, and was mentioned in despatches for the 11th time. At his special request, when he was conferred with vestments and accoutrements of the Order of St Michael and St George by King George V, the King dubbed him "Sir Harry" rather than "Sir Henry".

== Later life ==
=== Between the wars ===
Chauvel's AIF appointment was terminated on 9 December 1919, and the next day he was appointed Inspector General, the Army's most senior post, which he held until 1930. The office of Inspector General had been created as an auditor who provided annual reports to the Council of Defence. In the event of war, it was intended that the Inspector General would become the Commander in Chief with the Military Board as his general staff. Chauvel's annual reports tended to emphasise the parlous state of the nation's defences. He warned, for example, that if war came, soldiers would "be subject to the unfair handicap and the certainty of increased loss of life which inferiority in armament and shortage of ammunition must inevitability entail". Looking back from the perspective of World War II, historian Gavin Long noted that Chauvel's annual reports were "a series of wise and penetrating examinations of Australian military problems of which, however, little notice was taken".

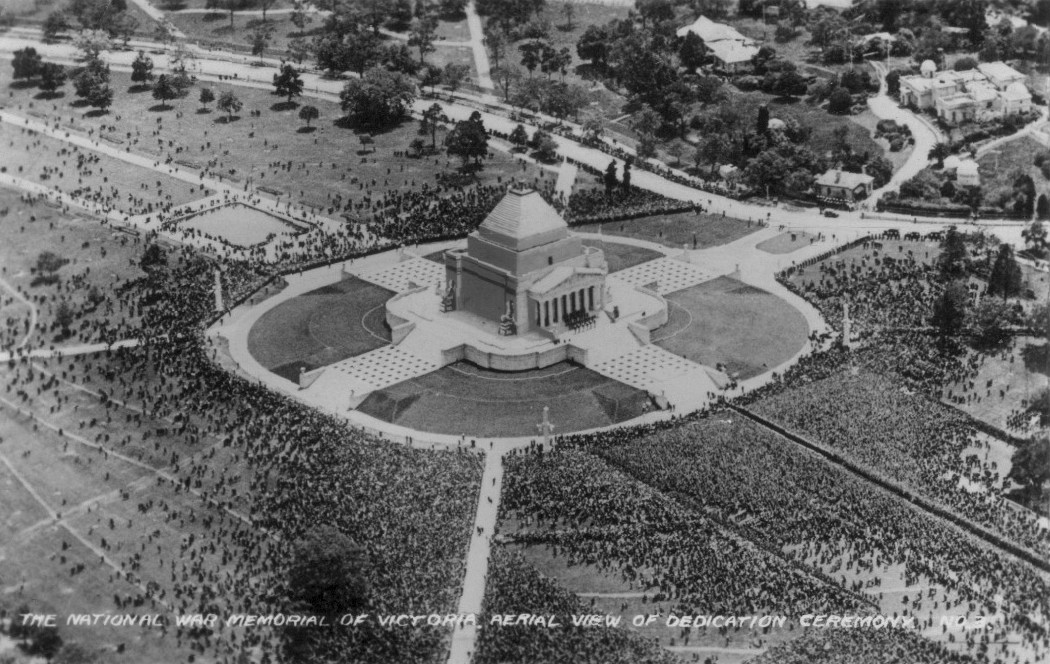
The dedication ceremony for the Shrine of Remembrance. Over 300,000 people were in attendance, a figure that was approximately a third of Melbourne's population at the time.

In February 1920, Chauvel was promoted to the substantive rank of lieutenant general, back-dated to 31 December 1919. In January 1920, he chaired a committee to examine the future structure of the army. The committee's recommendations proved to be next to impossible to implement in the face of defence cuts that were imposed in 1920 and 1922. On Lieutenant General Brudenell White's retirement as Chief of the General Staff in 1923, that post was divided into two, with Chauvel becoming 1st Chief of the General Staff as well as Inspector General, while Brigadier General Thomas Blamey became 2nd Chief of the General Staff. Chauvel also served as Chairman of the Chiefs of Staff Committee, being the senior of the three service chiefs. In November 1929, he became the first Australian to be promoted to the rank of general. He attempted to maintain the Army's structure in the face of short-sighted politicians intent on cutting expenditure. As a result, the Army became increasingly hollow, retaining the form of a large force without the substance. When conscription was abolished by Prime Minister James Scullin's government in 1929, it was left up to Chauvel to attempt to make the new volunteer system work. He finally retired in April 1930.

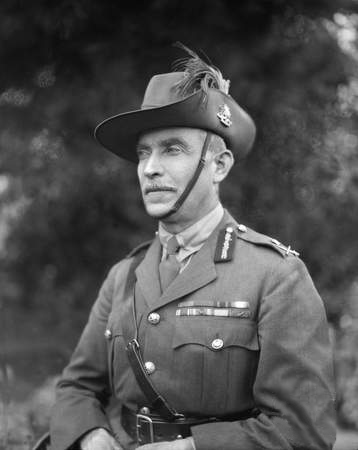
Chauvel at Maribyrnong camp in March 1923.

Chauvel's sons Ian and Edward resigned their commissions in the Australian Army in 1930 and 1932 respectively, and accepted commissions in cavalry regiments of the British Indian Army. His daughter Elyne married Thomas Walter Mitchell, a grazier. Chauvel became a frequent visitor to their property "Towong Hill" near Corryong, Victoria. He was staying at Towong Hill during the Black Friday Bushfires of 1939. When the property was threatened by fire, he directed the firefighting effort, and at one point climbed a tree close to the house to hack away burning branches.

The dedication of the Shrine of Remembrance in 1934 saw a series of reunions. Ian and Edward arrived from India on leave, Alexander Godley came from Britain, and Richard Howard-Vyse as chief of staff to Prince Henry, Duke of Gloucester. In 1937, Chauvel travelled to the United Kingdom as head of the Australian contingent for the coronation of King George VI, where he was welcomed by Chetwode and Howard-Vyse. Chauvel had the contingent dressed as light horsemen, wearing emu plumes, bandoliers and spurs. When the Dominion troops assembled at Buckingham Palace to receive their King George VI Coronation Medals, Chauvel led the parade, with Howard-Vyse as his chief of staff. On the way back, the contingent visited France, where ceremonies were held at the Villers–Bretonneux Australian National Memorial and the Arc de Triomphe. Chauvel frequently led Anzac Day parades through Melbourne but resigned from the leadership of the march in 1938 in protest against a decision by the Returned and Services League of Australia to change the form of service at the Shrine from a Christian to a secular one.

=== Second World War and legacy ===
During the Second World War, Chauvel was recalled to duty in 1940 as Inspector in Chief of the Volunteer Defence Corps (VDC), the Australian version of the British Home Guard. Following Brudenell White's death in the Canberra air disaster, Prime Minister Robert Menzies turned to Chauvel for advice on a successor as Chief of the General Staff. On Chauvel's recommendation, Menzies appointed Lieutenant General Vernon Sturdee to the post. During the war, Chauvel's son Ian served as staff officer in the Italian campaign, while Edward was posted to New Guinea to learn about jungle warfare from the Australian Army. Chauvel's daughter Eve joined the Women's Royal Australian Naval Service and spent a day in a lifeboat in the North Atlantic after her ship was torpedoed by a U-boat. Tom Mitchell was captured by the Japanese in the Battle of Singapore. Chauvel remained with the VDC, based at Victoria Barracks, Melbourne but constantly travelling on inspections until his death on 4 March 1945.

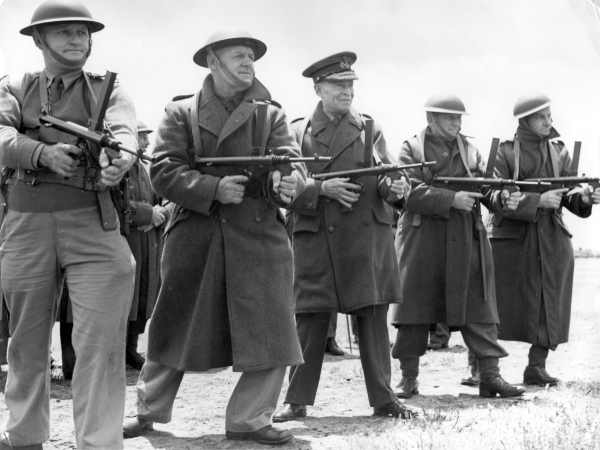
General Sir Harry Chauvel (centre) with a group of VDC officers holding Owen guns

Chauvel was given a state funeral service at St Paul's Cathedral, Melbourne officiated by the Anglican Archbishop of Melbourne, Joseph John Booth, after which he was cremated at Springvale Crematorium with full military honours. Eight generals acted as pallbearers: Lieutenant General John Northcott, Chief of the General Staff; Lieutenant General John Whitham, Corps Commander, VDC; Major General James Cannan, Quartermaster General; Major General Charles Brand; Major General Cyril Clowes, GOC, Victoria Line of Communications Area; Major General John Austin Chapman, Deputy Chief of General Staff; Major General Charles Lloyd, Adjutant General; and Major General Clive Steele, Engineer in Chief.

Portraits of Chauvel are held by the Australian War Memorial in Canberra, the Naval and Military Club in Melbourne, and the Imperial War Museum in London. A portrait by George Washington Lambert is in the possession of the family. Chauvel is commemorated in a bronze plaque in St Paul's Cathedral, Melbourne. His sword is in Christ Church, South Yarra, his uniform in the Australian War Memorial, and his saddle is kept by the 1st Armoured Regiment in South Australia. There is also a memorial window in the chapel of the Royal Military College, Duntroon. Chauvel Street in North Ryde, Sydney is named in his honour.

Chauvel's daughter Elyne Mitchell wrote a number of non-fiction works about her father and his corps. In his book Seven Pillars of Wisdom, T. E. Lawrence provided a wildly inaccurate version of Chauvel. Charles Bean noted that "this wise, good and considerate commander was far from the stupid martinet that readers of Lawrence's Seven Pillars of Wisdom might infer." Lawrence confessed that "little of his book was strict truth though most of it was based on fact."

Chauvel's nephew Charles Chauvel became a well-known film director, whose films included Forty Thousand Horsemen (1940), about the Battle of Beersheba.

Harry Chauvel was portrayed in film: by Bill Kerr in The Lighthorsemen (1987), which covered the exploits of an Australian cavalry regiment during the Third Battle of Gaza; by Ray Edwards in A Dangerous Man: Lawrence After Arabia (1990), which took place around the 1919 Paris peace conference; and by Colin Baker in the 1992 Young Indiana Jones TV movie Daredevils of the Desert, another retelling of the Third Battle of Gaza from the director of The Lighthorsemen.

== See also ==
- Jean Chauvel (Ambassadeur de France)

== Citations ==
Military offices
Preceded by Major General Sir Brudenell White	Chief of the General Staff; 1923–1930	Succeeded by Major General Walter Coxen
New command	General Officer Commanding Anzac Mounted Division; 1916–1917	Succeeded by Major General Sir Edward Chaytor
Preceded by Brigadier General Talbot Hobbs	General Officer Commanding 1st Division; 1915–1916	Succeeded by Major General Sir Harold Walker
