= Lawrence O'Donnell (general) =

Australian Army officer (1933–2026)

Lawrence George O'Donnell
- Born: 17 January 1933; Quairading, Western Australia
- Died: 28 March 2026 (aged 93); Canberra, Australian Capital Territory
- Military career
- Allegiance: Australia
- Branch: Australian Army
- Service years: 1952–1990
- Rank: Lieutenant General
- Commands: Chief of the General Staff (1987–90); Land Commander Australia (1986–87); Field Force Command (1985–86); Deputy Chief of the General Staff (1984–85)
- Conflicts: Malayan Emergency; Vietnam War
- Awards: Companion of the Order of Australia; Mentioned in Despatches
- Other work: President, National Rifle Association of Australia (1990–06)

Lieutenant General Lawrence George O'Donnell AC (17 January 1933 – 19 March 2026) was a senior officer in the Australian Army who served as Chief of the General Staff (1987–1990).

== Military career ==
As an exchange troop leader O'Donnell served with 1st King's Dragoon Guards and was dispatched as part of the British Army response to the Malayan Emergency in 1957.

He was posted to the 3rd Cavalry Regiment and, as a major, was deployed to Vietnam where he was Mentioned in Despatches.

He was appointed Chief of the General Staff in 1987 and made a Companion of the Order of Australia (AC) in 1989 for service to the Australian Army in this role.

In retirement he became Chairman of a campaign to build a permanent monument in Canberra to commemorate the contributions of migrants to Australia. In 2000, he shot for Australia at Bisley, captaining the Kolapore Team.

He died on 19 March 2026.

Military offices
Preceded by Lieutenant General Peter Gration	Chief of the General Staff; 1987–1990	Succeeded by Lieutenant General John Coates
Preceded by Major General Peter Gration	Deputy Chief of the General Staff; 1984–1985	Succeeded by Major General Peter Day
