= John Whitham =

Australian general (1881–1952)

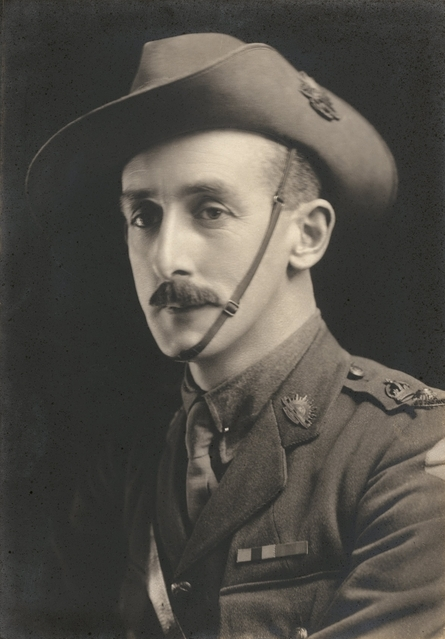
- Lieutenant Colonel John Whitham c. 1919
- Born: 7 October 1881; Jamalpur, Bengal, India
- Died: 12 May 1952 (aged 70); Concord, New South Wales, Australia
- Military career
- Allegiance: Australia
- Branch: Australian Army
- Service years: 1898–1946
- Rank: Lieutenant General
- Commands: Volunteer Defence Corps, 3rd Military District (1940–45); Southern Command (1940); 4th Division (1937–40); 3rd Military District (1937–40); 1st Military District (1935–37); 1st Mixed Brigade (1935–37); 6th Military District (1933–35); 49th Battalion (1918); 52nd Battalion (1917–18)
- Conflicts: Second Boer War; First World War; Gallipoli campaign; Landing at Anzac Cove; Western Front; Battle of Pozières; Battle of Passchendaele; Second Battle of Dernancourt; Second Battle of Villers-Bretonneux; Second World War
- Awards: Companion of the Order of St Michael and St George; Distinguished Service Order; Mentioned in Despatches (3)

Lieutenant General John Lawrence Whitham, CMG, DSO (7 October 1881 – 12 May 1952) was a senior officer in the Australian Army who held senior commands in the 1930s and early 1940s.

He was awarded the Distinguished Service Order (DSO) during the First World War for his heroic actions during the Hundred Days Offensive in the final days of the war. The citation for the medal, appearing in The London Gazette in September 1918, reads:

For conspicuous gallantry and devotion to duty. This officer commanded his battalion in a difficult night operation with great ability. Following an enemy advance, in which a village was lost, the battalion, which had already marched six miles, took part in a counter-attack. The ground was strange, and there was no time for reconnaissance, but the approach march and employment was carried out without a hitch, and the attack was a brilliant success. He moved about encouraging and directing his troops, and established his headquarters well forward in an open trench, from which, though under heavy fire, he was able to control his battalion.
