= Mervyn Brogan =

Australian general

Sir Mervyn Francis Brogan
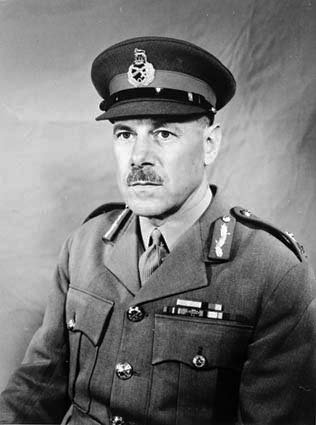
- Brogan as GOC Northern Command in 1963
- Born: 10 January 1915; Crows Nest, New South Wales
- Died: 8 March 1994 (aged 79)
- Military career
- Allegiance: Australia
- Branch: Australian Army
- Service years: 1932–1973
- Rank: Lieutenant General
- Service number: NX76403
- Commands: Chief of the General Staff (1971–73); Eastern Command (1968–71); Northern Command (1962–65); Australian Staff College (1960–62); School of Military Engineering (1947–49)
- Conflicts: Second World War; Battle of Buna-Gona; Salamaua-Lae campaign; Huon Peninsula campaign; Finisterre Range campaign; Western Allied invasion of Germany
- Awards: Knight Commander of the Order of the British Empire; Companion of the Order of the Bath; Mentioned in Despatches

Lieutenant General Sir Mervyn Francis Brogan, KBE, CB (10 January 1915 – 8 March 1994) was a senior officer in the Australian Army who served as Chief of the General Staff from 1971 to 1973.

A 1935 graduate of the Royal Military College, Duntroon, where he was the Corps Sergeant Major and was awarded the Sword of Honour, and of the University of Sydney, where he earned a Bachelor of Engineering degree, Brogan served in the Second World War on the staff of New Guinea Force during New Guinea Campaign, and as an observer with the British Army during the Western Allied invasion of Germany. After the war he was commandant and chief instructor at the School of Military Engineering during the 1949 Australian coal strike, and, as Director of Military Training, reopened the Land Warfare Centre at Canungra in 1954. When he was appointed the Chief of the General Staff in 1971, he was the first occupant of that position to possess a university degree. He presided over the withdrawal of Australian troops from the Vietnam War, the ending of the National Service scheme, and the consequent reduction of the size of the Army, and sweeping organisational changes.

== Early life ==
Mervyn Francis Brogan was born in Crows Nest, New South Wales, on 10 January 1915, the son of Bernard Brogan and his wife Hilda. He had an older brother, Bernard Alwyn, who later became a wing commander in Royal Australian Air Force. Upon receiving his leaving certificate, he was awarded a scholarship to study at the Sydney Technical College; but as part of the Combined Schools team, he played rugby against the Royal Military College, Duntroon, which had moved from Canberra to the Victoria Barracks, Sydney, due to the Great Depression, and decided to go there instead. His application was accepted, and he entered the Royal Military College on 25 February 1932.

In his final year, Brogan was the Corps Sergeant Major, the senior cadet appointment, and on graduation was awarded the Sword of Honour. He was commissioned as a lieutenant in the Australian Staff Corps on 11 December 1935. On 16 March 1936, he entered the University of Sydney, where he earned a Bachelor of Engineering degree. He did some work on the fortifications on Rottnest Island guarding the city of Perth. He was on the university's swimming and water polo teams, and was a blue in rugby. After graduation he was posted to Melbourne as the Adjutant and Quartermaster, 3rd Division Engineers on 7 August 1938, and then to Army Headquarters at Victoria Barracks, Melbourne, on 23 March 1939. He played rugby for Victoria in 1938 and 1939, and attended tryouts for the Wallabies.

== Second World War ==
When the Second World War broke out in 1939, he sought an appointment with the Second Australian Imperial Force (AIF), but instead was sent to Duntroon as an instructor on 11 November 1939. He became a temporary captain on 1 July 1940. On 25 June 1941, he married Shiela Jones, the daughter of David Samuel Jones, a teacher at the Duntroon School. Her brother gave the bride away, and his acted as his best man. They had two children, Edward and Daryl. He joined the AIF on 22 September 1941, and was allotted the AIF service number NX76403. He was appointed GSO2 of Home Forces on 22 December 1941. This became Second Army on 6 April 1942. He was promoted to the temporary rank of major on 1 July 1942; this became substantive on 1 September.

On 8 November 1942, he became Deputy Assistant Quartermaster General (DAQMG) of New Guinea Force. He became Assistant Quartermaster General (AQMG) of I Corps and New Guinea Force with the temporary rank of lieutenant colonel on 2 August 1943, and AQMG of New Guinea Force on 27 August 1943. He was involved in organising the air supply in support of the Salamaua–Lae campaign, for which he was mentioned in despatches on 23 December 1943, and was appointed an Officer of the Order of the British Empire on 27 April 1944. He was GSO1 of the Military Training Branch at Allied Land Forces, South West Pacific Area (LHQ) from 5 January 1944 to 6 November 1944. He represented the ACT in rugby in 1941 and 1944. In 1945, Brogan was sent as an observer with the British Army during the Western Allied invasion of Germany. Soon after he arrived, he came down with malaria, a legacy of his service in New Guinea, to the surprise of the doctors, who were not used to seeing a tropical disease in North West Europe.

== Post-war ==
Brogan remained in Europe until 1947, when he returned to Australia to become commandant and chief instructor at the School of Military Engineering. He assisted in organising Royal Australian Engineers to mine coal during the 1949 Australian coal strike. He then went back to Britain as a student at the Joint Services Staff College there from 1950 to 1952. In 1954, he became Director of Military Training. In the years since the Second World War, the Australian Army had lost most of its expertise in jungle warfare, as it concentrated on Australia's commitment to the Korean War, and plans to support the British Army in the Middle East. Brogan reopened the Land Warfare Centre at Canungra, incorporating lessons from the British Army's experience in the Malayan Emergency.

Brogan served as a brigadier on the staff of the British Army's Far East Land Forces from 1956 to 1958, and went back to Britain once more to attend the Imperial Defence College in 1959. He then became the commandant of the Australian Staff College. He was General Officer Commanding Northern Command from 1962 to 1965, and was upgraded to a Commander of the Order of the British Empire in the 1963 Birthday Honours. In 1965 he was an Australian Representative on the Military Committee of the South East Asia Treaty Organisation. He was Director of Joint Service Plans from 1965 to 1966, when he became the Quartermaster-General and Third Member of the Military Board. In December 1968, he became General Officer Commanding Eastern Command, vice Sir James Harrison, who had been appointed Governor of South Australia. He was made a Commander of the Order of the Bath in the 1970 New Year Honours.

== Chief of the General Staff ==
On 19 May 1971, Brogan reached the pinnacle of his career when he was appointed as the Chief of the General Staff (CGS) with the rank of lieutenant general. He was the first occupant of that position to possess a university degree. He was upgraded to a Knight Commander of the Order of the British Empire for his service in that role in the 1972 Birthday Honours. Australian troops were serving in the Vietnam War at that time, but the commitment was winding down. In response to the American Vietnamization policy, the 8th Battalion, Royal Australian Regiment was withdrawn in 1970 and not replaced. The last infantry battalion, the 4th Battalion, Royal Australian Regiment, was withdrawn in December 1971, and the 1st Australian Logistic Support Group followed. With the election of the Whitlam government in December 1972, the last troops, the Australian Army Training Team Vietnam were withdrawn.

It fell to Brogan to implement sweeping changes. The Whitlam government swiftly terminated the National Service scheme, causing the manpower of both the Australian Regular Army and the CMF to rapidly shrink. The number of battalions in the Royal Australian Regiment was reduced from nine to six, but Brogan clung to the divisional structure, which would remain until the 1990s. The Department of the Army was abolished, replaced by the new Department of Defence. The old regional commands were abolished, replaced by four functional commands, and the number of bodies reporting to Army Headquarters was reduced from 140 to just four. Brogan revived the position of Vice CGS, appointing Major General Francis Hassett, who would become his successor, to the post.

Brogan's term as CGS ended on 19 November 1973. He retired in January 1975. He was Colonel Commandant of the Royal Australian Engineers from 1974 to 1978, and Honorary Colonel of the University of New South Wales Regiment from 1975 to 1980. He died in Sydney on 8 March 1994.

== Notes ==
Military offices
Preceded by Lieutenant General Sir Thomas Daly	Chief of the General Staff; 1971–1973	Succeeded by Lieutenant General Frank Hassett
