= Walter Coxen =

Australian Army officer

Walter Adams Coxen
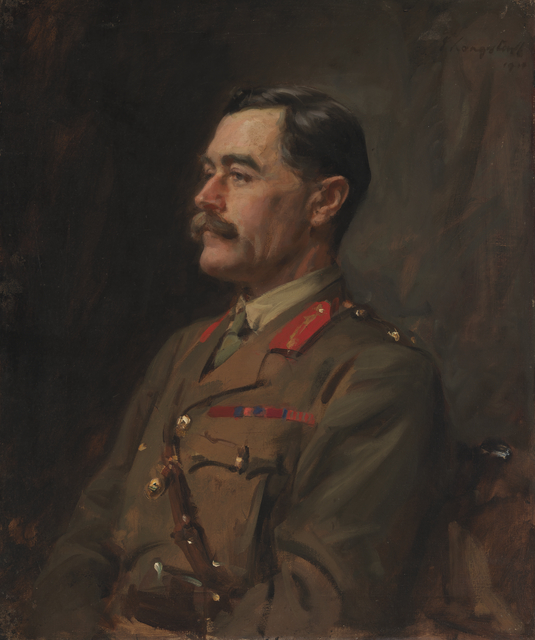
- Portrait of Brigadier General Walter Coxen drawn in 1919
- Born: 22 June 1870; Egham, Surrey, England
- Died: 15 December 1949 (aged 79); Heidelberg, Victoria, Australia
- Military career
- Allegiance: Australia
- Branch: Australian Army
- Service years: 1893–1931
- Rank: Major General
- Nickname: Boss Gunner
- Commands: Chief of the General Staff; Australian Corps Artillery; 1st Division Artillery; 36th Heavy Artillery Group
- Conflicts: First World War; Gallipoli Campaign; Western Front; Battle of the Somme; Battle of Pozières; Battle of Bullecourt; Third Battle of Ypres; Battle of Amiens
- Awards: Companion of the Order of the Bath; Companion of the Order of St Michael and St George; Distinguished Service Order; Mentioned in Despatches (4); Croix de Guerre (Belgium)
- Other work: Director of Victoria's centenary celebrations

Major General Walter Adams Coxen CB, CMG, DSO (22 June 1870 – 15 December 1949) was a senior Australian Army officer in the First World War. In April 1930 Coxen was promoted to the position of Chief of the General Staff. He retired in 1931.

== Early life and career ==
Walter Adams Coxen was born at Egham, England, on 22 June 1870. Coxen and his family moved to Australia in 1880. Walter was educated at Brisbane Grammar School and Toowoomba Grammar School. He took a job with the Queensland Department of Railways as a clerk and draftsman on 18 August 1887, but was retrenched in 1892 due to the depression of the 1890s.

In 1893 Coxen was commissioned into the Queensland Militia Garrison Artillery as a second lieutenant. In June 1895 he was promoted to the rank of lieutenant in the Permanent Military Forces, in the Queensland Artillery. In 1897 he was sent to England to study at the Royal School of Gunnery at Shoeburyness, concentrating on coast defence and siege artillery, and then went to Aldershot for training with the Royal Artillery in 1898.

On returning to Australia in 1899 he was appointed commander of the garrison on Thursday Island, with the rank of captain. In July 1902 he succeeded Major William Bridges as Chief Instructor at the School of Gunnery at Middle Head. In November 1907, Coxen again went to England for ordnance training at the Royal Military Academy at Woolwich.

He was promoted to major in 1908, and returned to Australia in February 1910. Coxen served briefly with the coast artillery at Fort Queenscliff before becoming Inspector of Ordnance and Ammunition at Army Headquarters in Melbourne. In January 1911 he became Director of Artillery.

== First World War ==
On 14 August 1914, Coxen also became Inspector of Coast Defences with the rank of lieutenant colonel.

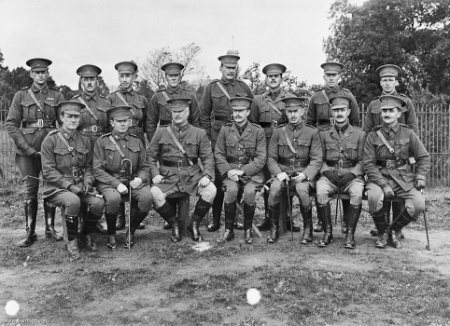
Group portrait of Siege Artillery Brigade officers (SAB), 1914, Melbourne. Commanding Officer LtCol Coxen seated front row centre.

On 21 May 1915 Coxen was ordered to raise the brigade of siege artillery (SAB) for service in Europe. The brigade was to consist of two batteries, with eight siege guns to be supplied by Britain and 415 officers and other ranks, about half of whom would be permanent force artillery gunners. The brigade, which became known as the 36th Heavy Artillery Group (36 HAG), departed Melbourne on 17 July 1915 and landed in England on 25 August 1915. After a delay due to a short supply of heavy artillery pieces, the 54th Siege Battery was equipped with 8 inch howitzers and the 55th Siege Battery with 9.2 inch howitzers. The batteries moved to France on 26 February and 2 March 1916 respectively.

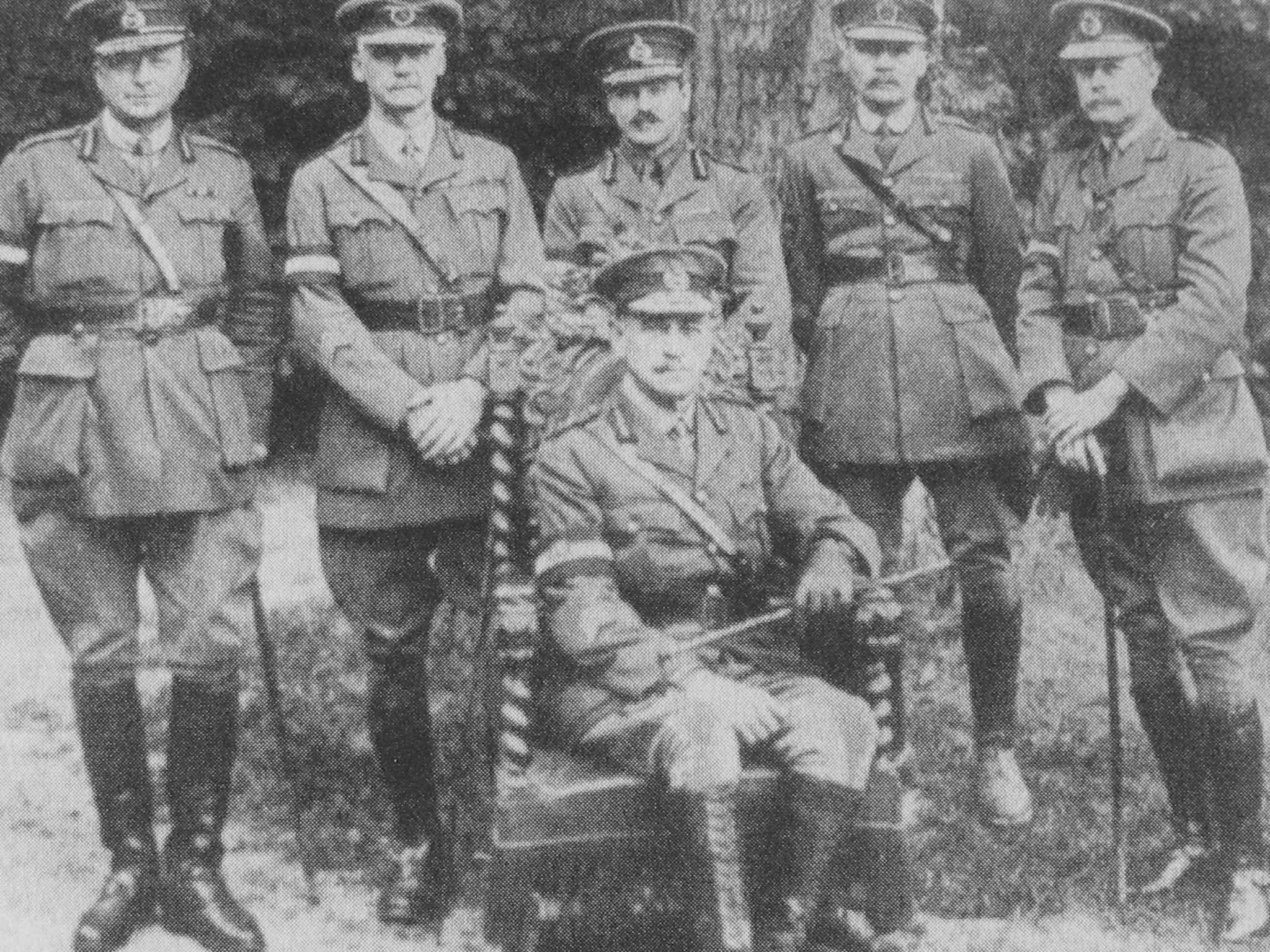
Lieutenant-General Monash (seated, centre) at his headquarters in France, March 1918. Brigadier General Cox stands on the far right.

The 36th Heavy Artillery Group began operations in support of the British XVII Corps in the Arras sector before moving south to join the British Fourth Army for the Battle of the Somme. The Group then joined I Anzac Corps Artillery at Pozières and took part in the Battle of Pozières in support of the Australian infantry. For his services, Coxen was awarded the Distinguished Service Order (DSO) in the 1917 New Year Honours.

On 18 January 1917, Coxen replaced Brigadier General Talbot Hobbs as commander of the 1st Division Artillery. On his appointment to the 1st Division, Coxen was promoted to temporary brigadier general. He served in that capacity through the German withdrawal to the Hindenburg Line, the Battle of Bullecourt and the Third Battle of Ypres. On 18 October 1917, Coxen took over as commander of the Australian Corps Artillery and was appointed a Companion of the Order of St Michael and St George (CMG) in the 1918 New Year's Honours.

On 16 November 1918, five days after the Armistice with Germany which ended the war, Coxen became Director of Ordnance in the AIF's Department of Repatriation in London. He returned to Australia in August 1919 and became Chief of Ordnance, and a member of the Military Board. In the 1919 New Year's Honours, Coxen was appointed a Companion of the Order of the Bath (CB).

== Post war ==
In January 1920 he was promoted to full colonel. He became Deputy Quartermaster General in April 1920, Chief of Artillery in May 1921 and Quartermaster General in 1925. In March 1927 he was promoted to major general and finally became Chief of the General Staff in April 1930. Due to a new government policy on retirements, he was retired on 1 October 1931.

In retirement he was director of the council for Victoria's centenary celebrations in 1934. Coxen died at the Repatriation General Hospital, Heidelberg on 15 December 1949 and was cremated with full military honours.

== See also ==
- List of Australian generals
- Fort Queenscliff Museum

Military offices
Preceded by General Sir Harry Chauvel	Chief of the General Staff; 1930–1931	Succeeded by Major General Sir Julius Bruche
