= John Grey (Australian general) =

Australian Army officer

John Cedric Grey
- Born: 31 January 1939 (age 87); Sydney, New South Wales
- Military career
- Allegiance: Australia
- Branch: Australian Army
- Service years: 1957–1995
- Rank: Lieutenant General
- Commands: Chief of the General Staff (1992–95); Deputy Chief of the General Staff (1991–92); Australian Command and Staff College (1986–88); 1st Armoured Regiment (1978–79)
- Conflicts: Vietnam War
- Awards: Companion of the Order of Australia; Commendation for Distinguished Service
- Other work: Chancellor of James Cook University

Lieutenant General John Cedric Grey, AC (born 31 January 1939) is a retired senior officer of the Australian Army who served as Chief of the General Staff from 1992 to 1995. He later served as Chancellor of James Cook University from 1999 to 2016.

== Early life ==
Grey was born in Sydney, New South Wales, on 31 January 1939, to Aubrey Cedric and Dacia Downing Grey. He was educated at St Andrew's Cathedral School and Sydney Grammar School, then entered the Royal Military College, Duntroon as an officer cadet in 1957.

== Military career ==
Grey was posted to the 3rd Cavalry Regiment and, as a captain, was deployed to Vietnam for which he was belatedly awarded the Commendation for Distinguished Service. By 1984 he had been promoted to colonel and made Director of Co-ordination at the Department of Defence.

He became Assistant Chief of Defence Force, Logistics and was made an Officer of the Order of Australia (AO) in 1991 for service in that role.

He was appointed Chief of the General Staff in 1992 and made a Companion of the Order of Australia (AC) in 1995 for outstanding leadership, inspiration and dedication to the Australian Army during a period of profound restructuring.

== Retirement ==
In retirement, he established his own consultancy business based in Cairns. He also served as a Non-Executive Director of Tarong Energy and as Chancellor of James Cook University. In 2003 he was appointed Chairman of the Wet Tropics Manganese Authority Board in Queensland.

== Honours, awards and qualifications ==
- Companion of the Order of Australia (AC) 12 June 1995
- Officer of the Order of Australia (AO) 26 January 1991
- Commendation for Distinguished Service 3 June 1998
- Fellow of the Australian Institute of Management (F.A.I.M.)
- Graduate member of the Australian Institute of Company Directors (G.A.I.D.C.)
- National Defence College (India) (N.D.C.(I).)
- Joint Services Staff College (Australia) (J.S.S.C.)

== See also ==
- List of Australian generals and brigadiers

Military offices
Preceded by Lieutenant General John Coates	Chief of the General Staff; 1992–1995	Succeeded by Lieutenant General John Sanderson
Preceded by Major General Michael Jeffery	Deputy Chief of the General Staff; 1991–1992	Succeeded by Major General Arthur Fittock
