= John Coates (general) =

Australian Army officer (1932–2018)

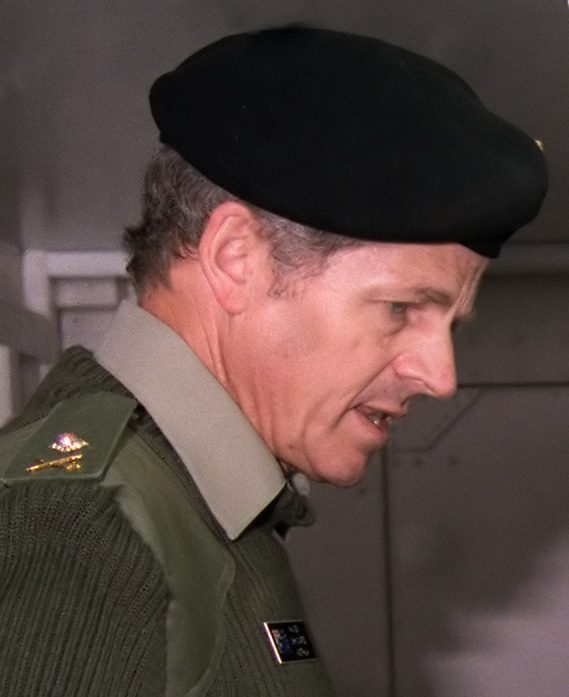
- Major General John Coates in 1985
- Born: 28 December 1932; Adelaide, South Australia
- Died: 11 June 2018 (aged 85); Canberra, Australian Capital Territory
- Military career
- Allegiance: Australia
- Branch: Australian Army
- Service years: 1953–1992
- Rank: Lieutenant general
- Service number: 17023
- Commands: Chief of the General Staff (1990–92); Royal Military College, Duntroon (1983–84); 3rd Cavalry Regiment (1971)
- Conflicts: Vietnam War
- Awards: Companion of the Order of Australia; Member of the Order of the British Empire

Lieutenant General Henry John Coates, AC, MBE (28 December 1932 – 11 June 2018) was a senior officer in the Australian Army who served as Chief of the General Staff from 1990 to 1992. After retiring from the army, he became an author and a visiting fellow at the Australian Defence Force Academy branch of the University of New South Wales, pursuing aspects of Australia's military history.

== Early life ==
Coates was born in Adelaide, South Australia, on 28 December 1932 to George Coates and his wife Gwenyth (née Begg). Educated at Ipswich Grammar School in Queensland, Coates graduated from the Royal Military College, Duntroon into the Royal Australian Armoured Corps in 1955.

== Military career ==
Coates was granted his first regimental posting in 1956 to the 1st Armoured Regiment. He served with the unit until 1958, when he was promoted to captain and reassigned as adjutant of the 10th Light Horse Regiment for a period of two years. He graduated with a Bachelor of Arts from the University of Western Australia in 1962, before completing Honours at the Australian National University in 1965.

He was posted to the 3rd Cavalry Regiment and, as a major, was deployed to Vietnam. He was appointed a Member of the Order of the British Empire in 1971. He graduated with a Master of Arts from the Australian National University in 1975. He subsequently became commanding officer of his regiment.

Coates was appointed commandant of the Royal Military College, Duntroon in 1983 and head of the Defence Staff in Washington, D.C., in 1984; he was appointed an Officer of the Order of Australia in 1987 in recognition of his service there.

He was appointed Assistant Chief of the Defence Force (Policy) in 1987 and appointed Chief of the General Staff in 1990; he was appointed a Companion of the Order of Australia in 1992 in recognition of his service to the Australian Army, particularly in that role.

== Retirement ==
In retirement he wrote a number of books about the Australian Army and Australian military history. These include:

- Suppressing insurgency: an analysis of the Malayan Emergency, 1948–1954 (1992)
- Review of the Ready Reserve scheme (co-authored with Hugh Smith, 1995)
- Bravery above blunder: the 9th Division at Finschhafen, Sattelberg and Sio (1999)
- The Australian centenary history of defence, co-editor (2001)
- An atlas of Australia's wars, volume 7 of The Australian centenary history of defence (OUP, Melbourne, 2001)
- An atlas of Australia's wars, 2nd edition, 2006.

Coates was a visiting fellow in the School of Humanities and Social Sciences at Australian Defence Force Academy campus of the University of New South Wales (UNSW@ADFA).

Aged 85, Coates died at his Canberra home on 11 June 2018.

Military offices
Preceded by Major General J. D. Kelly	Commandant of the Royal Military College, Duntroon; 1983–1984	Succeeded by Major General B. H. Hockney
Preceded by Lieutenant General Lawrence O'Donnell	Chief of the General Staff; 1990–1992	Succeeded by Lieutenant General John Grey
