= Arthur MacDonald =

Sir Arthur MacDonald
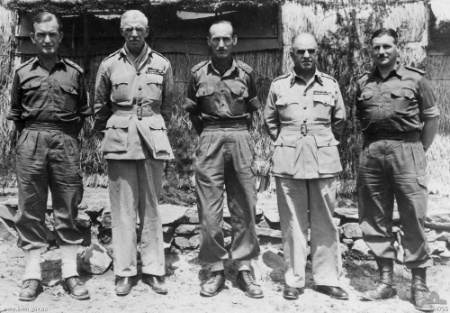
- MacDonald (far left) with other senior Australian officers in Korea, May 1953
- Born: 30 January 1919; Rockhampton, Queensland
- Died: 20 January 1995 (aged 75); Brisbane, Queensland
- Military career
- Allegiance: Australia
- Branch: Australian Army
- Service years: 1939–1979
- Rank: General
- Service number: 18
- Commands: Chief of the Defence Force Staff (1977–79); Chief of the General Staff (1975–77); Australian Forces Vietnam (1968–69); Deputy Chief of the General Staff (1966–67); Papua New Guinea Command (1965–66); 3rd Battalion, Royal Australian Regiment (1953–54)
- Conflicts: Second World War; North African Campaign; Second Battle of El Alamein; South West Pacific theatre; New Guinea campaign; Malayan Emergency; Korean War; Vietnam War
- Awards: Knight Commander of the Order of the British Empire; Companion of the Order of the Bath; Mentioned in Despatches; Officer of the National Order of Vietnam; Cross of Gallantry with Palm (Vietnam)
- Other work: Colonel Commandant of the Royal Australian Regiment (1981–85)

General Sir Arthur Leslie MacDonald, KBE, CB (30 January 1919 – 20 January 1995) was a senior officer in the Australian Army, who served in the positions of Chief of the General Staff from 1975 to 1977, then Chief of the Defence Force Staff from 1977 to 1979; the professional head of the Australian Army and Australian Defence Force respectively.

== Military career ==
MacDonald was born in Rockhampton, Queensland, on 30 January 1919. Entering the Royal Military College, Duntroon, he graduated as a lieutenant in 1939, and was posted to the 2/15th Battalion the following year for active service during the Second World War. MacDonald remained with the unit until the end of the war, which included seeing action at El Alamein during the North African Campaign, and New Guinea in the South West Pacific theatre.

In the 1953 New Year Honours, MacDonald was appointed an Officer of the Order of the British Empire for his service with the Australian Staff Corps. On 14 March 1953, MacDonald was posted to Korea and assumed command of the 3rd Battalion, Royal Australian Regiment. During his command of the unit, MacDonald was Mentioned in Despatches for his "personal example and professional ability". He returned to Australia during February 1954, and was posted as Director of Military Operations.

In 1965, MacDonald was posted as Commander Papua New Guinea Command. He returned to Australia the following year, and was posted as Deputy Chief of the General Staff and later as Adjutant General to the Australian Army. On 26 January 1968, MacDonald arrived in Vietnam and assumed command of the army component of the Australian forces in the country. He served in this position until February 1969, at which time he was re-posted as Adjutant General. For his services in Vietnam, MacDonald was appointed a Companion of the Order of the Bath, an Officer of the National Order of Vietnam and awarded the Vietnamese Cross of Gallantry with Palm.

In 1975, MacDonald was promoted to lieutenant general and assumed the position of Chief of the General Staff; the professional head of the Australian Army. Two years later, he was promoted to general and appointed Chief of the Defence Force Staff (CDFS) on 21 April 1977 in succession to General Sir Frank Hassett. In the 1978 New Years Honours, MacDonald was knighted as a Knight Commander of the Order of the British Empire.

== Later life ==
MacDonald retired from the Australian Army on 20 April 1979 and was succeeded as CDFS by Admiral Sir Anthony Synnot. In retirement, he served as Colonel Commandant of the Royal Australian Regiment from 1981 to 1985 and was part of the Defence Review Committee in 1981 to 1982.

Aged 75, MacDonald died on 20 January 1995. A military funeral was held in St. John's Cathedral, Brisbane, on 2 February. He is remembered as one who "possessed a fierce temper and an often irascible nature, which, combined with considerable intelligence and a capacity for hard work, made him a sometimes difficult superior."

== Notes ==
Military offices
Preceded by General Sir Frank Hassett	Chief of the Defence Force Staff; 1977–1979	Succeeded by Admiral Sir Anthony Synnot
Preceded by Lieutenant General Frank Hassett	Chief of the General Staff; 1975–1977	Succeeded by Lieutenant General Sir Donald Dunstan
