= Cheryl Pearce =

Australian army officer

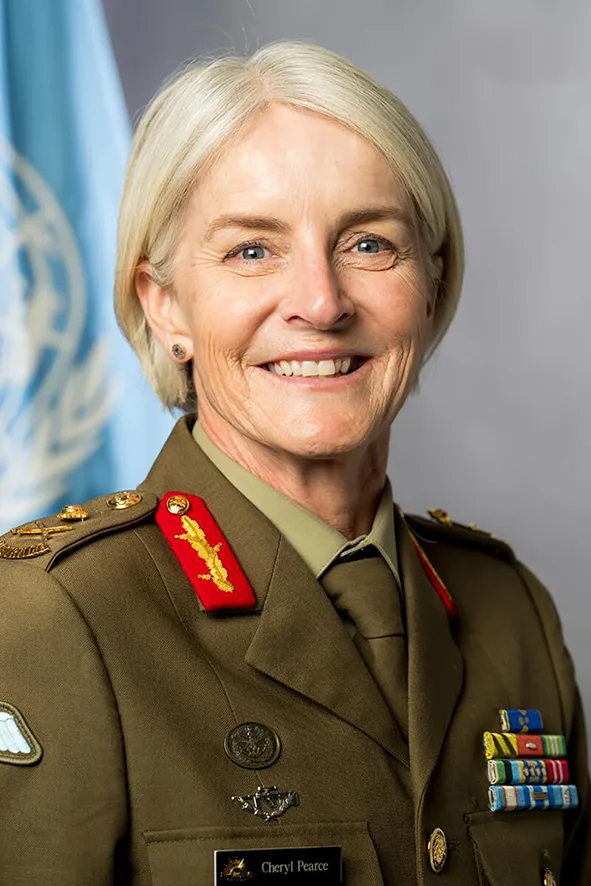
- Cheryl Pearce in 2025
- Born: Loxton, South Australia
- Military career
- Allegiance: Australia
- Branch: Australian Army
- Service years: 1984–2021; 2023–present
- Rank: Lieutenant General
- Commands: Deputy Chief of Army (2023–24); United Nations Peacekeeping Force in Cyprus (2019–21); Australian Defence Force Academy (2017–18); Task Group Afghanistan (2016); 1st Military Police Battalion (2006–08); Defence Police Training Centre (2003)
- Conflicts: United Nations Mission of Support to East Timor; War in Afghanistan; United Nations Peacekeeping Force in Cyprus
- Awards: Officer of the Order of Australia; Conspicuous Service Cross; Commendation for Distinguished Service
- Other work: Deputy Commissioner, Australian Border Force (2021–23)

Lieutenant General Cheryl Ann Pearce, AO, CSC is a senior officer in the Australian Army and a former deputy commissioner in the Australian Border Force. She graduated from the Officer Cadet School, Portsea and was commissioned into the Royal Australian Corps of Military Police in 1985. She has commanded the Defence Police Training Centre (2003), 1st Military Police Battalion (2006–08), Task Group Afghanistan (2016) and Australian Defence Force Academy (2017–18). Pearce has served on operations in East Timor and Afghanistan, and was Force Commander, United Nations Peacekeeping Force in Cyprus from January 2019 to January 2021. Pearce retired from full-time service in the army following her return from Cyprus and was appointed Deputy Commissioner Ports and Enforcement in the Australian Border Force in August 2021. She returned to the army in June 2023, on being appointed Deputy Chief of Army. She was seconded to the United Nations from January 2024 to September 2026, serving as Military Adviser for Peacekeeping Operations.

== Military career ==
Pearce graduated from the Officer Cadet School, Portsea and was commissioned into the Royal Australian Corps of Military Police in December 1985. Her early career featured a range of regimental and staff appointments, including postings to Headquarters 1st Brigade, to the G3 (operations) branch at Land Headquarters, and as staff officer to the commandant of the Australian Defence Force Academy. She graduated from the Australian Command and Staff College in 2001 and, in 2002, deployed as a military observer with the United Nations Mission of Support to East Timor, for which she was awarded a Chief of the Defence Force Commendation.

Following her return to Australia, Pearce was appointed to command the Defence Police Training Centre in 2003. She was next posted as Provost Marshal – Army, prior to assuming command of the 1st Military Police Battalion from 2004 to 2006. In recognition of her "exceptional service" in these three positions, Pearce was appointed a Member of the Order of Australia in the 2007 Australia Day Honours. Pearce was subsequently posted to the directing staff of the Australian Command and Staff College, served as Director Network Centric Warfare in the Capability Development Group, and served as Director Special Operations Support from 2010 to 2012. She attended the Higher Command and Staff Course in the United Kingdom in 2013 and, on her return to Australia, was appointed chief of staff at Headquarters Australian Army from 2013 to 2016.

In 2016, Pearce deployed to the Middle East as commander of Task Group Afghanistan. The task group, as part of Australia's contribution to NATO's Resolute Support Mission, provided training and advice to the Afghan National Security Forces. Pearce's "distinguished performance" during the nine-month deployment was recognised with the award of the Commendation for Distinguished Service in the 2018 Queen's Birthday Honours. Pearce was subsequently appointed commandant of the Australian Defence Force Academy from 2017 to 2018. In November 2018, the Secretary-General of the United Nations, António Guterres, announced that Pearce had been selected to succeed Major General Mohammad Humayun Kabir as Force Commander of the United Nations Peacekeeping Force in Cyprus (UNFICYP). Pearce, who assumed command of UNFICYP in January 2019, is the second woman to be appointed force commander of a United Nations mission. As force commander, she was responsible for more than 800 personnel from 15 nations working to maintain peace and stability in Cyprus, in spite of the additional challenges posed by the COVID-19 pandemic. Pearce relinquished command of UNFICYP on 4 January 2021 and, for her "outstanding achievement" in the role, she was awarded the Conspicuous Service Cross in the 2022 Australia Day Honours.

Pearce retired from full-time service in the army shortly following her return from Cyprus and, on 30 August 2021, she was appointed Deputy Commissioner Ports and Enforcement in the Australian Border Force. Pearce's role was later changed to Deputy Commissioner South, East and Workforce, in which she oversaw Border Force operations in south eastern Australia and was responsible for the organisation's workforce capability and sustainment. She left Border Force and returned to full-time service in the army in June 2023, on being appointed Deputy Chief of Army. In January 2024, Pearce was again seconded to the United Nations, being appointed Deputy Military Adviser for Peacekeeping Operations. She served in the role for only two months before being appointed acting Military Advisor for Peacekeeping Operations and, in 2025, was promoted to lieutenant general. In recognition of her "institutional leadership, strategic vision, and enduring commitment to global military cooperation" as Deputy Chief of Army and United Nations Military Advisor, Pearce was advanced to an Officer of the Order of Australia in the 2026 King's Birthday Honours.

== Personal life and education ==
Pearce was born in Loxton, South Australia. She has a partner, Paul, and two daughters.

Pearce holds a Bachelor of Arts in Asian Studies from the University of New England, a Graduate Diploma of Management in Defence Studies from the University of Canberra, a Master of Intelligence, Policing and Counter Terrorism from Macquarie University, and a Master of Arts in Defence Studies from Deakin University.

Military offices
Preceded by Major General Natasha Fox	Deputy Chief of Army; 2023–2024	Succeeded by Major General Chris Smith
Preceded by Major General Mohammad Humayun Kabir	Force Commander, United Nations Peacekeeping Force in Cyprus; 2019–2021	Succeeded by Major General Ingrid Gjerde
