= Military Board (Australia) =

Australian Army board of control

Australian Military Board
Agency overview
- Formed: 1905
- Dissolved: 1976
- Jurisdiction: Australian Military Forces
- Headquarters: Melbourne (1905–59); Canberra (1959–76)
- Parent department: Department of Defence (1905–39, 1973–76); Department of the Army (1939–73)

The Military Board, also known as the Military Board of Administration, was the controlling body of the Australian Military Forces (AMF) from 1905 to 1976. It was composed of senior military and civilian members, and chaired by the Chief of the General Staff (CGS). Initially based in Melbourne, the board relocated to Canberra in 1959.

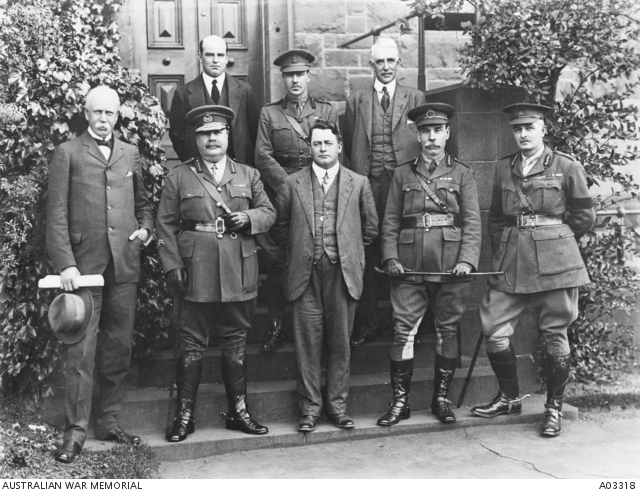
Members of the Military Board, 1914. Left to right, back row: V C Duffy Esq (Secretary), Lieutenant Colonel H W Dangar (Acting Chief of Ordnance), T Trumble Esq (Secretary Department of Defence); Front Row: Honourable G Swinburne (Civil member), Brigadier V.C.M. Sellheim (Adjutant General), Senator the Honourable E J Russell (Acting Minister), Brigadier General J K Forsyth (Quartermaster General) and Brigadier General J G Legge (Chief of the General Staff).

On its formation in January 1905, the regular members of the Military Board were the Minister for Defence (the president of the board), the Deputy Adjutant-General, the Chief of Intelligence, the Chief of Ordnance, and a civilian Finance Member; members of the Citizens Military Force could also attend board meetings as required. The CGS position was initiated in 1909. The board as a whole was responsible for administering the AMF, subject to the control of the Minister. In November 1939 the board came under the newly formed Department of the Army in place of the Department of Defence. In July 1942 the board was dissolved and its functions assumed by the commander-in-chief of the AMF, General Sir Thomas Blamey. The board was re-established in March 1946, and again came under the Department of Defence in November 1973. The Military Board was dissolved in February 1976.
