= Chief of Army (Australia) =

Head of the Australian Army

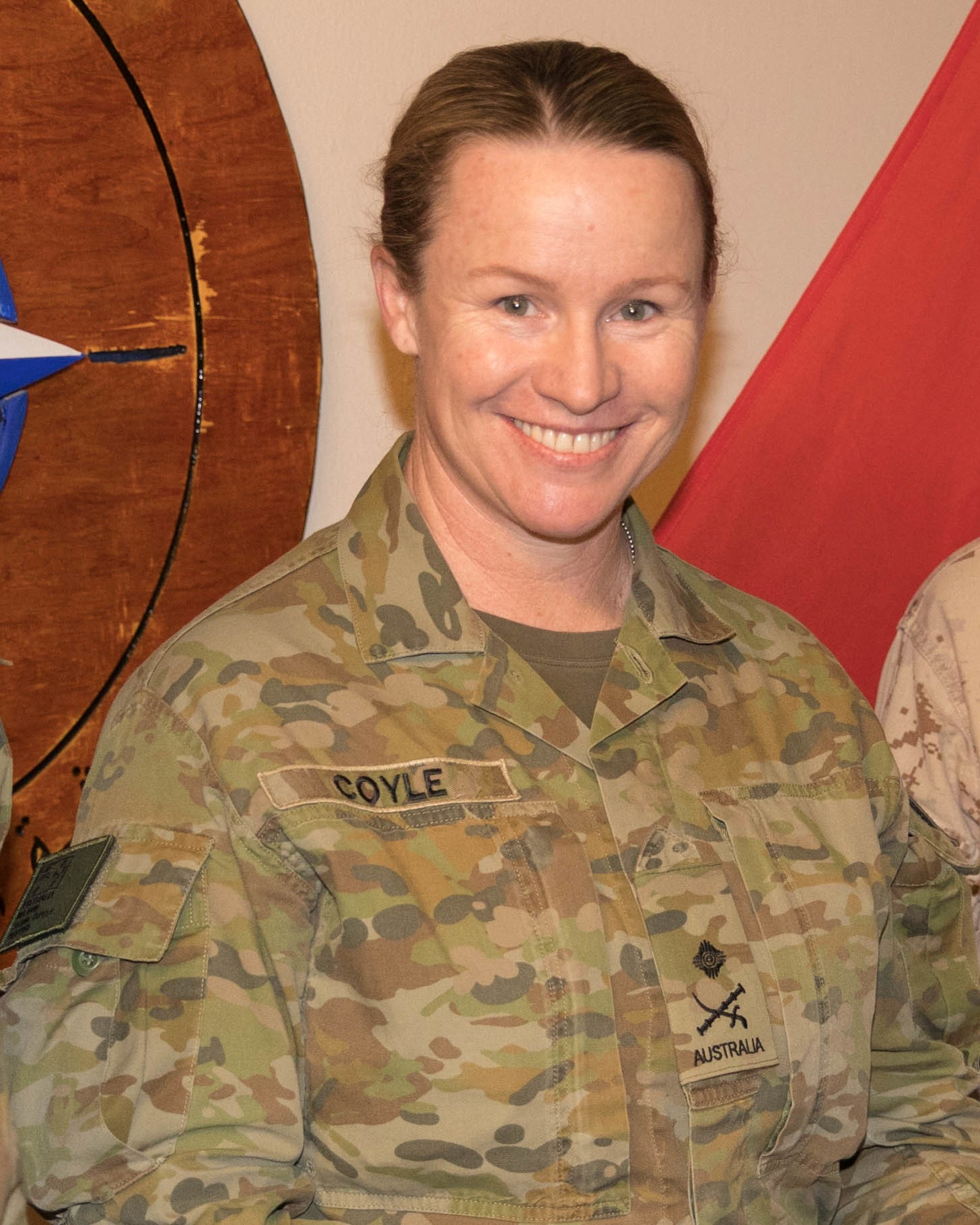
- Incumbent; Susan Coyle since 8 July 2026
- Australian Army
- Style: Lieutenant General
- Abbreviation: CA
- Member of: Australian Defence Force
- Reports to: Chief of the Defence Force
- Term length: Four years
- Formation: 29 January 1902
- First holder: Major General Sir Edward Hutton
- Deputy: Deputy Chief of Army
- Website: Official website

The chief of Army is the most senior appointment in the Australian Army, responsible to both the chief of the Defence Force (CDF) and the secretary of defence (SECDEF). The rank associated with the position is lieutenant general (3-star).

Lieutenant General Susan Coyle, the incumbent chief of Army, has held the post since 8 July 2026.

== History ==
The first commander of the Australian Army was titled general officer commanding, Australian Military Forces, in line with the usual British practice of the time. Experience soon showed that the position concentrated more power than the ministers for defence—of whom there were twelve in as many years in 1901–1913—liked. Moreover, the British Army had encountered administrative problems in the Second Boer War which led to the abolition of the position of commander-in-chief of the forces there in 1904, and its replacement by an Army Board.

In 1904, Minister for Defence Anderson Dawson commissioned a report which recommended a similar system for Australia, with a board consisting of four military members, the minister, and a finance member. This was implemented by his successor, James Whiteside McCay. Instead of creating a chief of the general staff as per the report, McCay's Military Board consisted of only three military members, the deputy adjutant general, the chief of ordnance, and the chief of intelligence.

The post of chief of the general staff was finally created by the new minister of defence, George Pearce, in 1909, with Colonel William Bridges becoming the first chief of the general staff. The military members of the Military Board then became the chief of the general staff, adjutant general, chief of ordnance, and quartermaster General.

During the Second World War, the threat of invasion led to a reversion to the old system. A commander in chief, General Sir Thomas Blamey, was appointed, and the Military Board was suspended, with its powers being transferred to the commander in chief. The post of chief of the general staff remained, but was now subordinate to the commander in chief.

This was successful from a military point of view but the problem of a concentration of power recurred and, after the war ended, the government decided to re-form the Military Board. Blamey was replaced by Lieutenant General Vernon Sturdee in 1945 and the next year the post of commander in chief was again abolished, with Sturdee becoming chief of the general staff.

The system continued until the reforms of Arthur Tange in 1973. The three services were unified under the Department of Defence. The Military Board was abolished and the chief of the general staff became subordinate to the chief of the Defence Force Staff and the secretary of defence. Reflecting this change from a staff to a command role, the post was renamed chief of Army in 1997.

== Appointees ==
The following table lists all those who have held the post of chief of Army or its preceding positions. Ranks and honours are as at the completion of their tenure.

No.	Portrait	Name	Took office	Left office	Time in office
General Officer Commanding Australian Military Forces
1	Sir Edward Hutton KCB, KCMG	Major General; Sir Edward Hutton KCB, KCMG (1848–1923)	29 January 1902	10 November 1904	1 year, 285 days
2	Harry Finn CB, DCM	Major General; Harry Finn CB, DCM (1852–1924)	11 November 1904	12 January 1905	62 days
Chief of the General Staff
3	William Bridges CMG	Colonel; William Bridges CMG (1861–1915)	1 January 1909	25 May 1909	144 days
4	Sir John Hoad KCMG	Major General; Sir John Hoad KCMG (1856–1911)	26 May 1909	30 May 1911	2 years, 4 days
5	Francis Adrian Wilson DSO	Lieutenant Colonel; Francis Adrian Wilson DSO (1874–1956)	1 June 1911	10 May 1912	344 days
6	Joseph Maria Gordon CB	Brigadier General; Joseph Maria Gordon CB (1856–1929)	11 May 1912	31 July 1914	2 years, 81 days
7	James Gordon Legge CMG	Colonel; James Gordon Legge CMG (1863–1947)	1 August 1914	23 May 1915	295 days
8	Godfrey Irving CMG	Colonel; Godfrey Irving CMG (1867–1937)	24 May 1915	31 December 1915	221 days
9	Hubert Foster	Colonel; Hubert Foster (1855–1919)	1 January 1916	30 September 1917	1 year, 272 days
(7)	James Gordon Legge CB, CMG	Major General; James Gordon Legge CB, CMG (1863–1947)	1 October 1917	31 May 1920	2 years, 243 days
10	Sir Brudenell White KCMG, KCVO, CB, DSO	Major General; Sir Brudenell White KCMG, KCVO, CB, DSO (1876–1940)	1 June 1920	10 June 1923	3 years, 9 days
11	Sir Harry Chauvel GCMG, KCB	General; Sir Harry Chauvel GCMG, KCB (1865–1945)	11 June 1923	15 April 1930	6 years, 308 days
12	Walter Coxen CB, CMG, DSO	Major General; Walter Coxen CB, CMG, DSO (1870–1949)	16 April 1930	30 September 1931	1 year, 167 days
13	Sir Julius Bruche KCB, CMG	Major General; Sir Julius Bruche KCB, CMG (1873–1961)	1 October 1931	20 April 1935	3 years, 201 days
14	John Lavarack CB, CMG, DSO	Major General; John Lavarack CB, CMG, DSO (1885–1957)	21 April 1935	12 October 1939	4 years, 174 days
15	Ernest Squires CB, DSO, MC	Lieutenant General; Ernest Squires CB, DSO, MC (1882–1940)	13 October 1939	26 January 1940	105 days
16	John Northcott CB	Major General; John Northcott CB (1890–1966)	27 January 1940	17 March 1940	50 days
(10)	Sir Brudenell White KCB, KCMG, KCVO, DSO	General; Sir Brudenell White KCB, KCMG, KCVO, DSO (1876–1940)	18 March 1940	13 August 1940	148 days
17	Vernon Sturdee CBE, DSO	Lieutenant General; Vernon Sturdee CBE, DSO (1890–1966)	14 August 1940	9 September 1942	2 years, 26 days
(16)	John Northcott CB	Lieutenant General; John Northcott CB (1890–1966)	10 September 1942	30 November 1945	3 years, 81 days
(17)	Sir Vernon Sturdee KBE, CB, DSO	Lieutenant General; Sir Vernon Sturdee KBE, CB, DSO (1890–1966)	1 December 1945	16 April 1950	4 years, 136 days
18	Sir Sydney Rowell KBE, CB	Lieutenant General; Sir Sydney Rowell KBE, CB (1894–1975)	17 April 1950	15 December 1954	4 years, 242 days
19	Sir Henry Wells KBE, CB, DSO	Lieutenant General; Sir Henry Wells KBE, CB, DSO (1898–1973)	16 December 1954	22 March 1958	3 years, 96 days
20	Sir Ragnar Garrett KBE, CB	Lieutenant General; Sir Ragnar Garrett KBE, CB (1900–1977)	23 March 1958	30 June 1960	2 years, 99 days
21	Sir Reg Pollard KBE, CB, DSO	Lieutenant General; Sir Reg Pollard KBE, CB, DSO (1903–1978)	1 July 1960	20 January 1963	2 years, 203 days
22	Sir John Wilton KBE, CB, DSO	Lieutenant General; Sir John Wilton KBE, CB, DSO (1910–1981)	21 January 1963	18 May 1966	3 years, 117 days
23	Sir Thomas Daly KBE, CB, DSO	Lieutenant General; Sir Thomas Daly KBE, CB, DSO (1913–2004)	19 May 1966	18 May 1971	4 years, 364 days
24	Sir Mervyn Brogan KBE, CB	Lieutenant General; Sir Mervyn Brogan KBE, CB (1915–1994)	19 May 1971	19 November 1973	2 years, 184 days
25	Frank Hassett AC, CB, CBE, DSO, LVO	Lieutenant General; Frank Hassett AC, CB, CBE, DSO, LVO (1918–2008)	20 November 1973	23 November 1975	2 years, 3 days
26	Arthur MacDonald CB, OBE	Lieutenant General; Arthur MacDonald CB, OBE (1919–1995)	24 November 1975	20 April 1977	1 year, 147 days
27	Sir Donald Dunstan KBE, CB	Lieutenant General; Sir Donald Dunstan KBE, CB (1923–2011)	21 April 1977	14 February 1982	4 years, 304 days
28	Sir Phillip Bennett KBE, AO, DSO	Lieutenant General; Sir Phillip Bennett KBE, AO, DSO (1928–2023)	15 February 1982	12 February 1984	1 year, 362 days
29	Peter Gration AO, OBE	Lieutenant General; Peter Gration AO, OBE (born 1932)	13 February 1984	12 April 1987	3 years, 58 days
30	Lawrence O'Donnell AC	Lieutenant General; Lawrence O'Donnell AC (born 1933)	13 April 1987	12 April 1990	2 years, 364 days
31	John Coates AC, MBE	Lieutenant General; John Coates AC, MBE (1932–2018)	13 April 1990	30 April 1992	2 years, 17 days
32	John Grey AC	Lieutenant General; John Grey AC (born 1939)	1 May 1992	7 July 1995	3 years, 67 days
33	John Sanderson AC	Lieutenant General; John Sanderson AC (born 1940)	8 July 1995	18 February 1997	1 year, 225 days
Chief of Army
(33)	John Sanderson AC	Lieutenant General; John Sanderson AC (born 1940)	19 February 1997	23 June 1998	1 year, 124 days
34	Frank Hickling AO, CSC	Lieutenant General; Frank Hickling AO, CSC (born 1941)	24 June 1998	15 July 2000	2 years, 21 days
35	Peter Cosgrove AC, MC	Lieutenant General; Peter Cosgrove AC, MC (born 1947)	16 July 2000	27 June 2002	1 year, 346 days
36	Peter Leahy AC	Lieutenant General; Peter Leahy AC (born 1952)	28 June 2002	3 July 2008	6 years, 5 days
37	Ken Gillespie AC, DSC, CSM	Lieutenant General; Ken Gillespie AC, DSC, CSM (born 1952)	4 July 2008	24 June 2011	2 years, 355 days
38	David Morrison AO	Lieutenant General; David Morrison AO (born 1956)	25 June 2011	15 May 2015	3 years, 324 days
39	Angus Campbell AO, DSC	Lieutenant General; Angus Campbell AO, DSC	16 May 2015	2 July 2018	3 years, 47 days
40	Rick Burr AO, DSC, MVO	Lieutenant General; Rick Burr AO, DSC, MVO (born 1964)	2 July 2018	1 July 2022	3 years, 364 days
41	Simon Stuart AO, DSC	Lieutenant General; Simon Stuart AO, DSC	2 July 2022	8 July 2026	4 years, 7 days
42	Susan Coyle AM, CSC, DSM	Lieutenant General; Susan Coyle AM, CSC, DSM (born 1970)	8 July 2026	Incumbent	61 days

== See also ==
- List of Australian Army generals
