= Deputy Chief of Army =

Australian Army position

- Incumbent; Chris Smith since 31 January 2024
- Australian Army
- Style: Major General
- Abbreviation: DCA
- Member of: Australian Defence Force
- Reports to: Chief of Army
- Formation: 1920
- First holder: Brigadier General Thomas Blamey
- Website: Official website

The Deputy Chief of Army (DCA) is the second most senior appointment in the Australian Army, responsible to the Chief of Army (CA). The rank associated with the position is major general (2-star).

The current appointee is Major General Chris Smith, who took up the posting on 31 January 2024.

== Appointees ==
The following (incomplete) list chronologically records those who have held the post of Deputy Chief of Army or its preceding positions. Rank and honours are as at the completion of the individual's term.

Rank	Name	Postnominals	Term began	Term ended	Notes
Deputy Chief of the General Staff
Brigadier General	Thomas Blamey	CB, CMG, DSO	1 April 1920	15 November 1923	
Second Chief of the General Staff
Brigadier General	Thomas Blamey	CB, CMG, DSO	15 November 1923	31 August 1925	
Colonel	William Foster	CB, CMG, DSO	1 September 1925	31 December 1925	(Acting)
Brigadier General	Charles Brand	CB, CMG, DSO	1 January 1926	1 May 1930	
Deputy Chief of the General Staff
Major General	John Northcott	CB, MVO	13 October 1939	31 August 1941	
Major General	Sydney Rowell	CBE	1 September 1941	April 1942	
Major General	George Alan Vasey	CBE, DSO & Bar	April 1942	September 1942	
Major General	Frank Berryman	CBE, DSO	September 1942	January 1944	
Major General	John Chapman	DSO & Bar	October 1944	11 March 1946	
Major General	Edward Milford	CBE, DSO	11 March 1946	May 1946	
Major General	Henry Wells	CBE, DSO	16 July 1946	1947	
Major General	Ronald Hopkins	CBE	1 May 1950	19 February 1951	
Major General	Eric Woodward	CBE, DSO	20 February 1951	1 September 1951	
Major General	Edward Sheehan	CBE	1 September 1951	22 December 1952	
Major General	Ragnar Garrett	CBE	9 February 1953	15 December 1953	
Major General	Lindley Barham	CBE	December 1953	29 October 1954	
Major General	Hector Edgar	CBE	30 October 1954	22 March 1958	
Major General	Ian Murdoch	CBE	23 March 1958	11 December 1960	
Major General	Thomas Taylor	CBE, LVO, MC	12 December 1960	24 January 1964	
Major General	Frank Hassett	CBE, DSO, LVO	25 January 1964	27 January 1966	
Major General	Charles Long	CBE	28 January 1966	17 April 1966	(Acting)
Major General	Arthur MacDonald	OBE	18 April 1966	27 August 1967	
Major General	Robert Hay	MBE	27 August 1967	9 February 1969	
Major General	Stuart Clarence Graham	DSO, OBE, MC	10 February 1969	3 May 1972	
Major General	Mark Bradbury	AO, CBE	24 November 1975	1977	
Major General	Donald Dunstan	CB, CBE	1977	20 April 1977	
Major General	John Whitelaw	AO, CBE	21 April 1977	1978	
Major General	John Williamson	AO, OBE	12 June 1978	18 February 1979	
Major General	Peter Falkland	AO	19 February 1979	27 May 1982	
Major General	David Engel	AO, OBE	28 May 1982	July 1983	
Major General	Peter Gration	OBE	July 1983	1983	
Major General	Lawrence O'Donnell		1984	1985	
Major General	Peter Day		1985	1986	
Major General	Gordon Fitzgerald	AO	1987	1990	
Major General	Michael Jeffery	AO, MC	1990	1991	
Major General	John Grey	AO	1991	1992	
Major General	Arthur Fittock	AO	1992	1992	
Major General	Geoffrey Carter	AO	November 1992	1995	
Deputy Chief of Army
Major General	John Hartley	AO	1995	1998	
Major General	Peter Abigail	AO	1998	May 2000	
Major General	Peter Leahy	AO	May 2000	June 2002	
Major General	Frank Roberts	AO	June 2002	May 2004	
Major General	Ian Gordon	AO	May 2004	November 2006	
Major General	John Cantwell	AO	January 2007	January 2008	
Major General	David Morrison	AM	January 2008	July 2009	
Major General	Paul Symon	AO	July 2009	November 2011	
Major General	Jeffrey Sengelman	DSC, AM, CSC	November 2011	2012	
Major General	Angus Campbell	DSC, AM	2012	19 September 2013	
Major General	Gus Gilmore	AO, DSC	19 September 2013	4 January 2015	
Major General	Rick Burr	AO, DSC, MVO	4 January 2015	3 May 2018	
Major General	Jake Ellwood	DSC	3 May 2018	10 December 2018	
Major General	Anthony Rawlins	DSC, AM	10 December 2018	2 February 2022	
Major General	Natasha Fox	AM, CSC	2 February 2022	5 June 2023	
Major General	Cheryl Pearce	AM, CSC	5 June 2023	31 January 2024	
Major General	Chris Smith	DSC, AM, CSC	31 January 2024	Incumbent	
