= Lieutenant general (Australia) =

Second-highest active rank of the Australian Army

- The LTGEN insignia of the Tudor Crown above a crossed sword and baton, with the word 'Australia' at the bottom.
- Country: Australia
- Service branch: Australian Army
- Abbreviation: LTGEN
- Rank: Three-star
- NATO rank code: OF-8
- Non-NATO rank: O-9
- Formation: 1917
- Next higher rank: General
- Next lower rank: Major general
- Equivalent ranks: Vice admiral (RAN); Air marshal (RAAF)

Lieutenant general (abbreviated LTGEN and pronounced 'lef-tenant general') is the second-highest active rank of the Australian Army. It was created as a direct equivalent of the British military rank of lieutenant general, and is considered a three-star rank.

The rank of lieutenant general is held by the Chief of Army. The rank is also held when an army officer is the Vice Chief of the Defence Force, the Chief of Joint Operations, or the Chief of Joint Capabilities. The Chief of Capability Development Group, disestablished in 2016, also carried three-star rank.

Lieutenant general is a higher rank than major general, but lower than general. Lieutenant general is the equivalent of vice admiral in the Royal Australian Navy and air marshal in the Royal Australian Air Force. The insignia for a lieutenant general is the Tudor Crown above a crossed sword and baton. (Note: Australian Army officer rank insignia are identical to British Army officer rank insignia, with the difference that Australian insignia have the word "Australia" below them.)

== Australian Army lieutenants general ==
The first Australian lieutenant general was Sir Harry Chauvel in 1917.

CGS/CA – Chief of the General Staff and Chief of Army

From 1 January 1909 to 18 February 1997, the most senior Australian Army position was named Chief of the General Staff. The first Australian to occupy this position was Colonel William Throsby Bridges. The first Australian lieutenant general to occupy this position was Sir Harry Chauvel, from 11 June 1923. Since August 1940, this position, and its successor (Chief of Army), have been held by Australian lieutenant generals.

Chairman, Chiefs of Staff Committee (1958–1965)

In March 1958, the role of Chairman, Chiefs of Staff Committee was created, but with no command authority. This was initially occupied by Lieutenant General Sir Henry Wells (March 1958 – March 1959), and was rotated through the three services, hence (briefly) providing a three-star position available to army officers. In 1968 this became a four-star position. It was replaced in February 1976 by a new position, Chief of Defence Force Staff, with command authority over the Australian Defence Force, and in October 1984 the position was renamed Chief of the Defence Force (CDF) to more clearly reflect the role and its authority.

Vice Chief of the Defence Force (since 1986)

In June 1986, the three-star position Vice Chief of the Defence Force (VCDF) was created. As with CDF, this position rotates between the forces. Lieutenant General John Baker was the first army officer to occupy the position (October 1992 – April 1995).

Chief of Capability Development Group (2003–2016)

A third three-star position, Chief of Capability Development Group (CCDG), which also rotates between the forces, was created in 2003. Lieutenant General John Caligari was the final officer of three-star rank to hold the position before it was disestablished in 2016

Chief of Joint Operations (since 2007)

In September 2007, a fourth three-star position, Chief of Joint Operations, was created.

Equivalents

There are two other permanent three-star positions in the Australian Defence Force, Chief of Navy and Chief of Air Force. There are also a number of other three-star-equivalent positions in the Australian Defence Organisation, but these are all held by civilians.

== List of lieutenants general ==
This along with the * (asterisk) indicates that the officer was subsequently promoted to general.
This along with the + (plus sign) indicates that the officer retired with the honorary rank of lieutenant general.
This along with the ^ (arrowhead) indicates that the officer is a currently serving lieutenant general.

The following people have held the rank of lieutenant general in the Australian Army:

Name	Date of promotion	Senior command(s) or appointment(s) in rank	Notes
Sir Harry Chauvel*	31 December 1919 (Note: Chauvel was promoted to temporary lieutenant general on 2 August 1917 on assuming command of the Desert Column; his rank was made substantive from 31 December 1919.)	Chief of the General Staff (1923–30), (Note: Chauvel was promoted to general in November 1929, the year prior to his retirement.) Inspector General of the Australian Army (1919–30), Desert Mounted Corps (1917–19)	
Sir John Monash*	1 January 1920 (Note: Monash was promoted to temporary lieutenant general on 1 June 1918 on assuming command of the Australian Corps; his rank was made substantive from 1 January 1920.)	Director General of Repatriation (1918–19), Australian Corps (1918)	
George Lee+	13 May 1920		
John William Parnell+	1 June 1920		
James Gordon Legge+	14 January 1924		
Sir James McCay+	21 December 1926		
Sir Talbot Hobbs+	24 August 1927		
Ernest Squires	30 June 1938	Chief of the General Staff (1939–40), Inspector General of the Australian Army (1938–39)	
Sir Brudenell White*	17 August 1939 (Note: White held the temporary rank of lieutenant general from 28 November 1918 to 15 April 1919 while serving as Chief of Staff, Australian Imperial Force. He transferred to the Unattached List in June 1923 and was placed on the Retired List with the honorary rank of lieutenant general on 17 August 1939, before being recalled to service and promoted to general in March 1940.)	Chief of the General Staff (1920–23, 1940)	
Sir Thomas Blamey*	13 October 1939	I Corps (1940–41)	
Sir Vernon Sturdee	13 October 1939	Chief of the General Staff (1940–42, 1946–50), First Army (1944–45)	
Sir John Lavarack	13 October 1939 / 18 June 1941 (Note: Lavarack accepted a demotion to major general in 1940 to assume command of the 7th Division.)	First Army (1942–44), I Corps (1941–42), Southern Command (1939–40)	
Edward Smart	24 October 1940	Southern Command (1940–42)	
Sir Iven Mackay	1 September 1941	New Guinea Force (1943–44), Second Army (1942–44)	
Sir John Northcott	6 April 1942	British Commonwealth Occupation Force (1946), Chief of the General Staff (1940, 1942–45)	
Henry Wynter	6 April 1942	Lieutenant General Administration at Allied Land Headquarters (1942–44), Eastern Command (1941–42)	
Gordon Bennett	1 September 1942	III Corps (1942–44)	
Sir Edmund Herring	1 September 1942	I Corps (1942–44), New Guinea Force (1942–43), II Corps (1942)	
Sir Carl Jess	1 September 1942	Chairman of the Manpower Committee (1939–44)	
Charles Miles	1 September 1942	Eastern Command (1940–41)	
Sir Leslie Morshead	1 September 1942	I Corps (1944–45), Second Army (1944), New Guinea Force (1944), II Corps (1943)	
Sir Stanley Savige	10 February 1944	II Corps (1944–45), New Guinea Force (1944), I Corps (1944)	
John Whitham+	4 April 1946 (Note: Whitham was promoted to temporary lieutenant general on 2 May 1940 on being appointed General Officer Commanding Southern Command. He was placed on the Retired List in 1941 and, on 4 April 1946, was granted the honorary rank of lieutenant general.)	Southern Command (1940)	
Sir Frank Berryman	1 October 1948	Eastern Command (1946–53), I Corps (1944), II Corps (1943–44)	
Sir Horace Robertson	1 October 1948	Southern Command (1953–54), British Commonwealth Forces Korea (1951), British Commonwealth Occupation Force (1946–51), First Army (1945–46)	
Sir Sydney Rowell	1 October 1948 (Note: Rowell was promoted to temporary lieutenant general on assuming command of I Corps in April 1942, but was dismissed from the command in September and subsequently reverted to major general. He was restored to temporary lieutenant general in 1946 on appointment as Vice Chief of the General Staff; his rank was made substantive on 1 October 1948.)	Chief of the General Staff (1950–54), Vice Chief of the General Staff (1946–50), I Corps (1942)	
Cyril Clowes+	1 June 1949		
Allan Boase+	20 February 1951	Southern Command (1949–51)	
Sir William Bridgeford+	14 March 1953	British Commonwealth Forces Korea (1951–53), Eastern Command (1951)	
Victor Secombe+	4 April 1954	Northern Command (1952–54), Eastern Command (1951–52)	
Sir Henry Wells	12 April 1954 (Note: Wells was promoted to temporary lieutenant general on 20 February 1951; his rank was made substantive on 12 April 1954.)	Chairman, Chiefs of Staff Committee (1958–59), Chief of the General Staff (1954–58), British Commonwealth Forces Korea (1953–54), Southern Command (1951–53)	
Rudolph Bierwirth	13 October 1954	British Commonwealth Forces Korea (1954–56)	
Sir Eric Woodward	30 October 1954	Eastern Command (1953–57)	
Robert Nimmo+	15 November 1954	United Nations Military Observer Group in India and Pakistan (1952–66)	
Sir Ragnar Garrett	16 December 1954	Chief of the General Staff (1958–60), Southern Command (1954–58)	
Sir Reginald Pollard	1 August 1957	Chief of the General Staff (1960–63), Eastern Command (1957–60)	
Hector Edgar	23 March 1958	Eastern Command (1960–63), Southern Command (1958–60)	
Sir John Wilton*	21 January 1963	Chairman, Chiefs of Staff Committee (1966–70), (Note: Wilton was promoted to general in September 1968, halfway through his term as Chairman, Chiefs of Staff Committee.) Chief of the General Staff (1963–66)	
Sir Thomas Daly	19 May 1966	Chief of the General Staff (1966–71)	
Sir Mervyn Brogan	19 May 1971	Chief of the General Staff (1971–73)	
Sir Francis Hassett*	20 November 1973	Chief of the General Staff (1973–75)	
Sir Arthur MacDonald*	24 November 1975	Chief of the General Staff (1975–77)	
Sir Donald Dunstan	21 April 1977	Chief of the General Staff (1977–82)	
Sir Phillip Bennett*	15 February 1982	Chief of the General Staff (1982–84)	
Peter Gration*	1984	Chief of the General Staff (1984–87)	
Lawrence O'Donnell	1987	Chief of the General Staff (1987–90)	
John Coates	1990	Chief of the General Staff (1990–92)	
John Sanderson	1992	Chief of Army (1995–98), (Note: Sanderson was Chief of the General Staff until the position was re-titled as Chief of Army in February 1997.) Commander Joint Forces Australia (1993–95), Commander United Nations Transitional Authority in Cambodia (1992–93)	
John Grey	1992	Chief of the General Staff (1992–95)	
John Baker*	1992	Vice Chief of the Defence Force (1992–95)	
Frank Hickling	1998	Chief of Army (1998–2000)	
Desmond Mueller	2000	Vice Chief of the Defence Force (2000–02)	
Peter Cosgrove*	2000	Chief of Army (2000–02)	
Peter Leahy	2002	Chief of Army (2002–08)	
David Hurley*	2003	Vice Chief of Defence Force (2008–11), Chief of Joint Operations (2007–08), Chief of Capability Development Group (2003–07)	
Ken Gillespie	2005	Chief of Army (2008–11), Vice Chief of the Defence Force (2005–08)	
Mark Evans	2008	Chief of Joint Operations (2008–11)	
Ash Power	18 May 2011	Chief of Joint Operations (2011–14)	
David Morrison	2011	Chief of Army (2011–15)	
Angus Campbell*	2013	Chief of Army (2015–18), Commander Operation Sovereign Borders (2013–15)	
John Caligari	2014	Chief of Capability Development Group (2014–15)	
Richard Burr	2018	Chief of Army (2018–22)	
John Frewen	2018	Chief of Joint Capabilities (2021–24), National COVID Vaccine Taskforce (2021–22), Principal Deputy Director Australian Signals Directorate (2018–21)	
Greg Bilton	2019	Chief of Joint Operations (2019–)	
Gavan Reynolds	2020	Chief of Defence Intelligence (2020–)	
Simon Stuart	2022	Chief of Army (2022–26)	
Natasha Fox^	5 June 2023	Chief of Personnel (2023–)	
Michelle McGuinness^	2024	National Cyber Security Coordinator (2024–)	
Susan Coyle^	2024	Chief of Army (2026–), Chief of Joint Capabilities (2024–26)	
Cheryl Pearce^	2025	Military Advisor for Peacekeeping Operations, United Nations (2024–)	
Scott Winter^	2026	Deputy Commander, United Nations Command (2026–)	

== See also ==
- Australian Defence Force ranks and insignia
- Australian Army officer rank insignia
- List of Australian Army generals
