= Chris Smith (general) =

Australian army officer

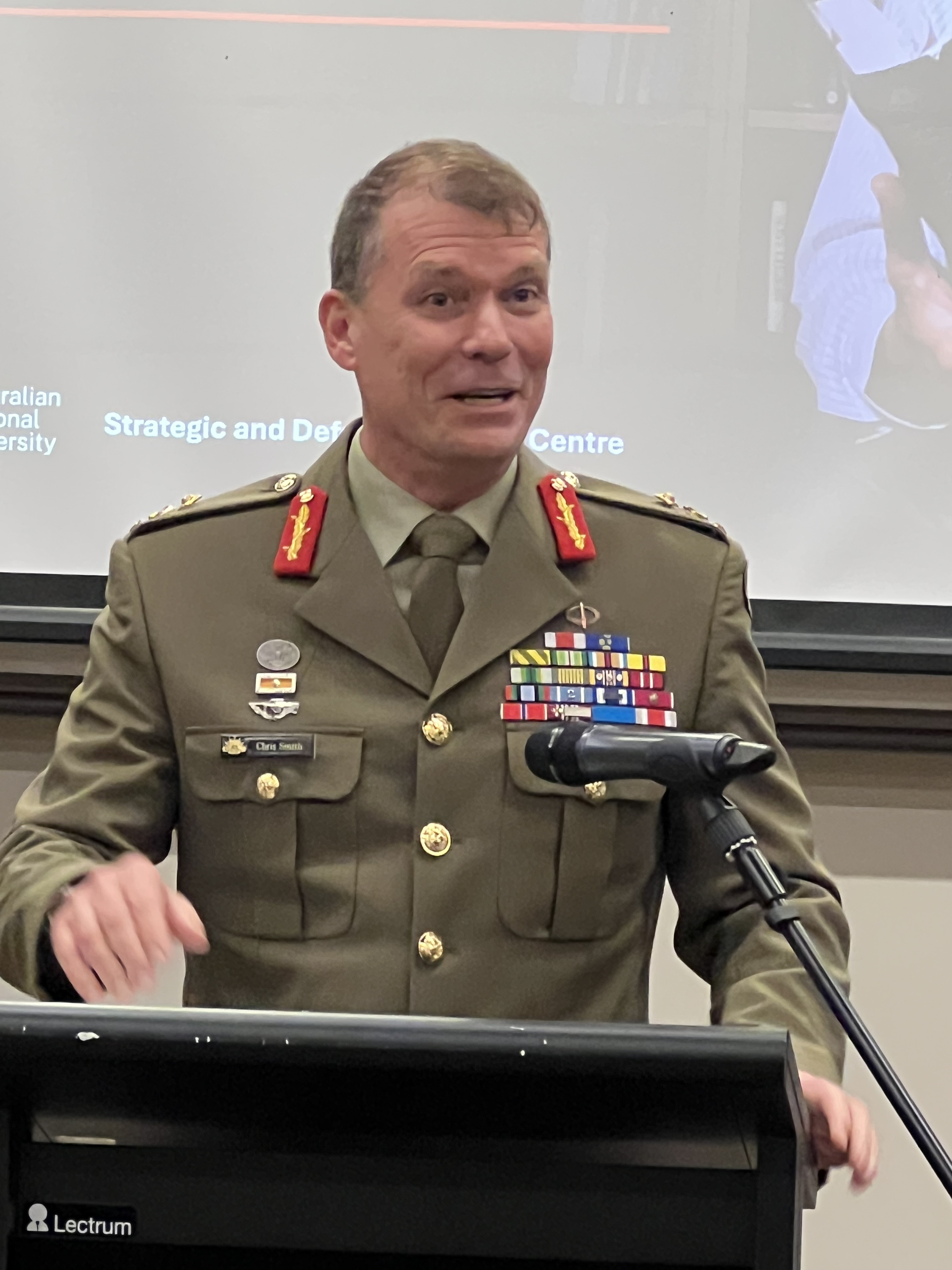
- Born: Launceston, Tasmania
- Education: Royal Military College, Duntroon; Australian Defence Force Academy; United States Army Command and General Staff College
- Military career
- Allegiance: Australia
- Branch: Australian Army
- Service years: 1991–present
- Rank: Major General
- Unit: Royal Australian Infantry Corps
- Commands: Deputy Chief of Army (2024–); Deputy Commanding General – Operations (2022–24); 2nd Battalion, Royal Australian Regiment (2010–13)
- Conflicts: Rwanda (UNAMIR); Iraq War; War in Afghanistan; Operation Paladin
- Awards: Distinguished Service Cross; Member of the Order of Australia; Conspicuous Service Cross; Officer of the Legion of Merit (United States); Bronze Star Medal (United States); Knight of the National Order of Merit (France)

Major General Christopher Robert Smith, DSC, AM, CSC is a senior officer in the Australian Army. He graduated from the Royal Military College, Duntroon in 1995 and was commissioned into the Royal Australian Infantry Corps. He served with the in United Nations Assistance Mission for Rwanda in 1995 and the United Nations Truce Supervision Organization. Most recently he served as the Deputy Commanding General – Operations for the United States Army Pacific from 2022–2024 before taking over the role of Deputy Chief of Army on 31 January 2024.

== Military career ==
He was awarded the Conspicuous Service Cross as part of the 2011 Queen's Birthday Honours for "outstanding achievement as Staff Officer One Future Land Operating Concept, Directorate of Future Land Warfare and Strategy, Land Warfare Development Centre, Army Headquarters." He was awarded the Distinguished Service Cross as part of the 2013 Australia Day Honours for "distinguished command and leadership in warlike operations and in action as the Commanding Officer, Mentoring Task Force 3 on Operation SLIPPER in Afghanistan from June 2011 to January 2012." He was appointed a Member of the Order of Australia as part of the 2022 Queen's Birthday Honours for "exceptional service as Chief of the Defence Force Liaison Officer to the Chairman of the Joint Chiefs of Staff United States and as Director General Land Operations, Army Headquarters." On 5 January 2024, he was appointed an Officer of the Legion of Merit with Oak Leaf Cluster at the conclusion of his appointment as the Deputy Commanding General – Operations United States Army Pacific.

Military offices
Preceded by Major General Cheryl Pearce	Deputy Chief of Army; 2024–present	Incumbent
Preceded by Major General Daniel McDaniel	Deputy Commander United States Army Pacific; 2022–2024	Succeeded by Major General Scott Winter
