= Thomas Daly (general) =

Australian general

Sir Thomas Joseph Daly
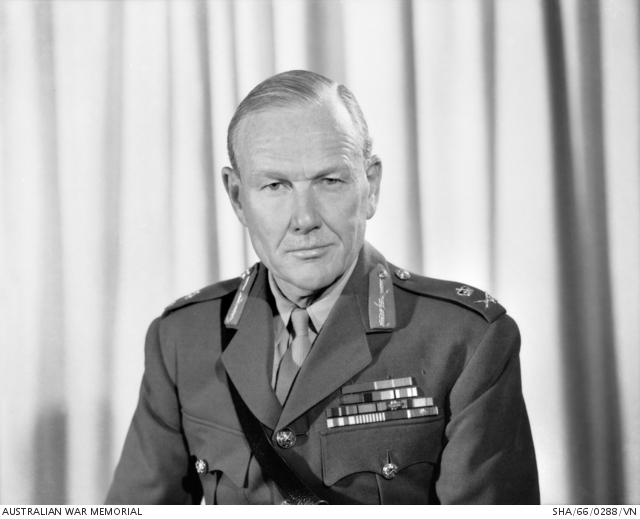
- Lieutenant General Thomas Daly in July 1966
- Born: 19 March 1913; Ballarat, Victoria
- Died: 5 January 2004 (aged 90); Sydney, New South Wales
- Military career
- Allegiance: Australia
- Branch: Australian Army
- Service years: 1930–1971
- Rank: Lieutenant General
- Commands: Chief of the General Staff (1966–71); Eastern Command (1963–66); Northern Command (1957–61); 28th Commonwealth Infantry Brigade (1952–53); 2/10th Battalion (1944–45)
- Conflicts: Second World War; North African Campaign; Siege of Tobruk; Western Desert campaign; New Guinea campaign; Borneo campaign; Korean War; Vietnam War
- Awards: Knight Commander of the Order of the British Empire; Companion of the Order of the Bath; Distinguished Service Order; Mentioned in Despatches (2); Officer of the Legion of Merit (United States)

Lieutenant General Sir Thomas Joseph Daly, KBE, CB, DSO (19 March 1913 – 5 January 2004) was a senior Australian Army officer, whose career culminated with his appointment as Chief of the General Staff (1966–1971).

== Early life ==
Born in Ballarat, Victoria, on 19 March 1913, Daly originally planned to become a doctor; however, having failed to gain entry into the university course of his choice, he entered the Royal Military College, Duntroon in 1930.

== Service history ==
Daly graduated as top cadet and in 1934 and was commissioned into the 4th Light Horse Regiment. He went on to serve with the British Army on India's North-West Frontier in 1938.

=== Second World War ===
Daly was appointed adjutant of the 2/10th Battalion on being seconded to the Second Australian Imperial Force in 1939. He served in North Africa as Brigade Major of the 18th Brigade, fighting at Tobruk and in the Western Desert.

Daly attended staff school in Haifa. He was then appointed senior staff officer to the Militia's 5th Division which saw service in New Guinea. By 1945, Daly was in command of the 2/10th Battalion, leading it in the invasion of Balikpapan in Borneo; he was awarded the Distinguished Service Order, and appointed an Officer of the Order of the British Empire.

=== Senior command ===
After the war, Daly's military service continued with staff appointments and a period as an instructor at the Staff College, Camberley. He married Heather Fitzgerald in 1946 and in 1948 went to England to attend the Joint Services Staff College (UK). A posting to Duntroon followed and in June 1952 Daly took command of the 28th Commonwealth Infantry Brigade – a formation comprising two British and two Australian battalions – then fighting in Korea. Daly was the first Australian to hold this command, and was appointed a Commander of the Order of the British Empire, and awarded the Legion of Merit from the United States of America for his command of the unit during the Korean War.

Daly was promoted to major general in 1959, and appointed a Companion of the Order of the Bath in the Queen's Birthday Honours of 1965. Promoted to lieutenant general in 1966, he was appointed Chief of the General Staff and knighted as a Knight Commander of the Order of the British Empire the following year.

Military offices
| Preceded by Lieutenant General Sir John Wilton | Chief of the General Staff; 1966–1971 | Succeeded by Lieutenant General Sir Mervyn Brogan |
