= Volunteer Defence Corps (Australia) =

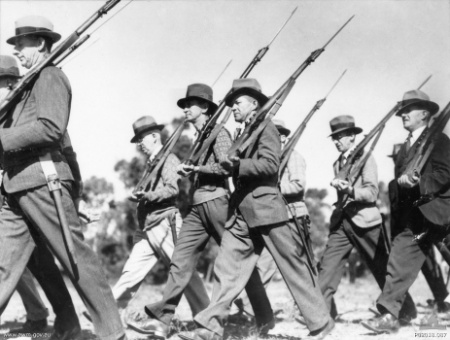
- Members of the VDC in 1942 before they were issued with uniforms
- Active: 1940–1945
- Disbanded: 24 August 1945
- Country: Australia
- Type: Militia

Commanders
- Inspector-General: General Harry Chauvel

The Volunteer Defence Corps (VDC) was an Australian part-time volunteer military force of World War II modelled on the British Home Guard.

== History ==
The VDC was established in July 1940 by the Returned and Services League of Australia (RSL) and was initially composed of ex-servicemen who had served in World War I. The government took over control of the VDC in May 1941, and gave the organisation the role of training for guerrilla warfare, collecting local intelligence and providing static defence of each unit's home area. General Sir Harry Chauvel, who had retired in 1930, was recalled to duty in 1940 and appointed Inspector-General of the VDC. Chauvel held this position until his death in March 1945.

Following the outbreak of the Pacific War, the Government expanded the VDC in February 1942. Membership was open to men aged between 18 and 60, including those working in reserved occupations. As a result, there were, by 1944, nearly 100,000 men in the VDC, organized into 111 battalions consisting of about 1,500 full-time personnel, over 30,000 part-time active members and over 43,000 part-time reserve members of the Volunteer Defence Corps.

As the perceived threat to Australia declined the VDC's role changed from static defence to operating anti-aircraft artillery, coastal artillery and searchlights. Members of inland VDC units were freed from having to attend regular training in May 1944 and the VDC was officially disbanded on 24 August 1945.

== Gallery ==
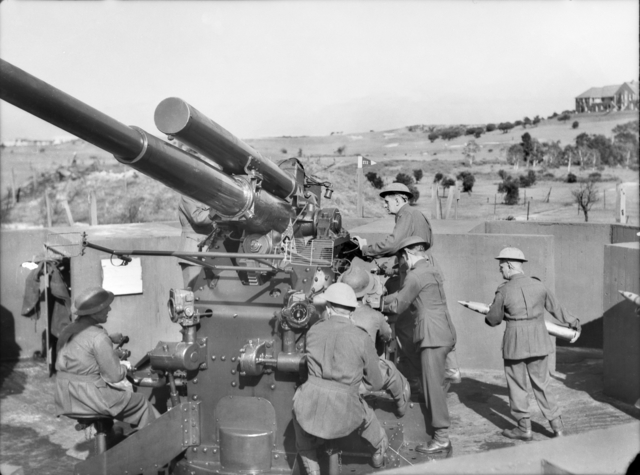
Members of the Volunteer Defence Corps training with a 3.7 inch anti-aircraft gun emplaced on Kensington golf links in Sydney.

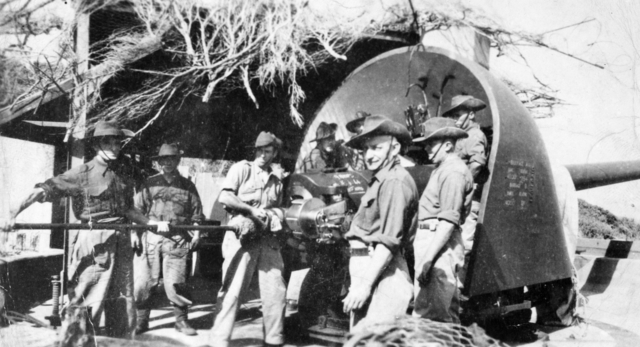
Fort Pearce, Port Phillip Heads Victoria. 6-inch gun crew from C Company 5th Battalion Volunteer Defence Corps prepare for action at training camp, April 1944.

== See also ==
- Home Guard (United Kingdom)
- Auxiliary Units
- Veterans Guard of Canada
- Pacific Coast Militia Rangers
- Home Guard (New Zealand)
