= List of Australian Army brigadiers =

The following is an incomplete list of Australian Army brigadiers and other senior Australian Army officers. (There is a separate list of Australian Army generals.)

== Ranks ==
An Australian Army brigadier is not classed as a "general", whereas an Australian Army brigadier general was. The senior Australian Army ranks are:

Senior Officer: brigadier.
General: brigadier general, major general, lieutenant general, general.
Marshal: field marshal.

== Background ==
The British Army replaced the rank of brigadier general with colonel-commandant in 1922, and then with brigadier in 1928. The rank insignia was changed from crossed sabre and baton to crown with three stars ("pips") to reflect that a brigadier is a senior colonel rather than a junior general. The Cadet Instructor's Handbook (2006), page 104 states:

1.25 At the end of World War I the British Government told the British Army that it had too many generals and that they were to be reduced in numbers. The Army did just that; it removed the word 'general' and was left with fewer generals and, at the same time, had created a 'new' rank.

1.26 The rank of brigadier general was abolished in the Australian Army in 1921, and it was eventually replaced by that of brigadier in 1929. In the interim titles such as 'colonel-in-command', 'colonel-of-staff' and 'colonel-commandant' were used for officers posted into that level of command.

== List ==
Rank	Name	Born	Died	Notes
Brigadier	Gerald Adams	1898	1990	
Brigadier	Bertram Alderson	1892	1983	
Brigadier	Archibald Allen	1888	1961	generals.dk
Brigadier	Basil Andrew	1894	1941	
Brigadier	Crispin Anstey	1901		
Brigadier	Chris Appleton			
Brigadier	Mark Armstrong	1973		"
Brigadier	Andrew Arthur	1909	1968	
Brigadier	Rob Atkinson	1947		
Brigadier	Maurice ("Bunny") Austin	1916	1985	
Brigadier	Steve Ayling			
Brigadier	Henry Bachtold	1891	1983	
Brigadier	Charles Barber	1888	1965	
Brigadier	Lindley Barham	1900	1995	
Brigadier	Lewis Barker	1895	1981	
Brigadier	Alfred Baxter-Cox	1898	1958	
Brigadier	Alf Garland	1932	2002	
Brigadier	Leslie Binns	1900	1965	
Brigadier	Arthur Blackburn	1892	1960	
Brigadier	Gordon Bleby	1910	1976	
Brigadier	Bruce Lockhart Bogle	1922	2012	
Brigadier	Wayne Bowen	1956		
Brigadier	John Raymond Broadbent (Quartermaster-General)	1893	1972	
Brigadier	Harry Charles Bundock	1886	1957	
Brigadier	Frederick Alexander Burrows	1897	1973	
Brigadier	Francis Robert Burton	1906	1993	
Brigadier	Gary Byles			
Brigadier	Claude Ewen Cameron	1894	1982	
Brigadier	Kenneth Chalmers	1900	1971	
Brigadier	Wilfrid Chapman	1891	1955	
Brigadier	Frederick Chilton	1905	2007	
Brigadier	William James Christie	1896	1979	generals.dk
Brigadier	Frederick Hay Christison	1891	1966	generals.dk
Brigadier	John Augustus Clarebrough	1894	1985	generals.dk
Brigadier	Donald Cleland	1901	1975	
Brigadier	Michael Lewis Clifford	1956	2017	
Brigadier	Jack Kerr Coffey	1900	1969	generals.dk
Brigadier	Harold Cohen	1881	1946	
Brigadier	Bertrand Combes	1894	1971	generals.dk
Brigadier	John Cosson			Director General Supply Army
Brigadier	John Craven	1894	1965	
Brigadier	John Wilson Crawford	1899	1943	
Brigadier	William Cremor	1897	1962	
	Ralph Daly	1902	1970	
	Jeff Davie			
	Charles Stewart Davies	1880	1946	
	Derek Deighton	1930	1991	
	Harold Charles de Low	1892	1957	
	Francis Plumly Derham	1885	1957	
Brigadier	Adrian d'Hagé	1946		
	Harold Clive Disher	1891	1976	
	William Huggett Douglas	1895	1982	
Brigadier	Gregory Francis Downing			
Brigadier	Geoffrey Drake-Brockman	1885	1977	
	Herbert Frederick Henry Durant	1899	1974	
	Leslie Glanville Howard Dyke	1900	1984	
Brigadier	Tom Eastick	1900	1988	
Brigadier	Cedric Edgar	1901	1967	
	Henry Herrick Edwards	1896	1959	
	Cyril Maurice Lloyd Elliott	1899	1983	
Brigadier	John Essex-Clark	1931		
Brigadier	Bernard Evans	1905	1981	
Brigadier	Peter Evans	1937	-	Chairman Duntroon Society
Brigadier	Neil Fairley	1891	1966	
	David Ferguson	1941		
	Luke Ferguson			
Brigadier	Maurice Fergusson	1895	1975	
	Albert Cecil Fewtrell	1885	1950	
	Frederick Percy Herbert Fewtrell	1894	1964	
Brigadier	John Field	1899	1974	
	Gerard Fogarty			
	Alexander Moore Forbes	1892	1961	
Brigadier	Neil Mackenzie Freeman	1890	1961	
	Peter Gates	1966		
	Stephen Gilbert Friend	1896	1960	
	Vivian Harrold Gatliff	1889	1963	
Brigadier	Ian Geddes	1921	2007	
Brigadier	Ian Gilmore	1925	2013	Chair of Legacy Australia
	Arthur Harry Langman Godfrey	1896	1942	
Brigadier	Wayne Goodman			
Brigadier	Eugene Gorman	1891	1973	
	William Allan Hailes	1891	1949	
	Eric Fairweather Harrison	1881	1948	
	Neville Gordon Hatton	1895	1983	
	William Alexander Henderson	1882	1949	
Brigadier	Scott Hicks			Director General - Defence Force Recruiting, VP, Strategy and Business Development - EOS Australia
	John Hill	1888	1961	
	Frederick Brock Hinton	1892	1969	
	Oswald Vick Hoad	1888	1963	
	Gary Hogan			
	Austin Claude Selwyn Holland	1889	1965	
Brigadier	William 'Bill' Horrocks	1958		
Brigadier	Garth Hughes	1935	2017	President Australian Ordnance Council
Brigadier	Ronald Godfrey Howy Irving	1898	1965	
Brigadier	Donald Robert Jackson	1915	1986	
Brigadier	Oliver David Jackson	1919	2004	
Brigadier	Wayne Jackson			
Brigadier	Peter Robin Jeffrey	1960		
	Maurice Barber Bevan Keating	1887	1952	
Brigadier	Michael Christopher Kehoe			Comd LSF/17 (CSS) Bde 2005–06
Brigadier	Charles Kellaway	1889	1952	
	Roy King	1897	1959	
	Douglas Oswald Luke Kitto	1895	1988	
	Errol Knox	1889	1949	
Brigadier	George Furner Langley	1891	1971	
Brigadier	Peter Lambert			
Brigadier	Ian Lillie			
Brigadier	Edmund Lind	1888	1944	
Brigadier	Ian D. Langford	1975		
	John Lloyd	1894	1965	
	William James Macavoy Locke	1894	1962	
	Thomas Steane Louch	1894	1979	
	Leonard Cuthbert Lucas	1894	1978	
	Daniel Aston Luxton	1891	1960	
	Thomas Fergus Buchanan MacAdie	1919	1973	
Brigadier	Malcolm Hudson MacKenzie-Orr			President Australian Ordnance Council
	Patrick Sanfield McGrath	1898	1972	
Brigadier	Peter McGuinness	1945	2003	
Brigadier	Tim McKenna	1954		
	Eric George Henderson McKenzie	1896	1957	
	Kenneth Alan McKenzie	1893	1948	
Brigadier	Barry Neil McManus	1962		
	Douglas Murray McWhae	1884	1969	
	Noel Maguire			
Brigadier	John Walter Main CBE	1899	1969	
	Gordon Maitland	1896	1982	
	Gordon Edward Manchester	1885	1957	
	Jack Mann	1897	1968	
Brigadier	Norman Marshall	1886	1942	
	James Eric Gifford Martin	1904	1993	
	Athelsan Markham Martyn	1881	1956	
Brigadier	Duncan Maxwell	1892	1969	
	Stephen Meekin			
	Ian Meibusch	1933	2013	
Brigadier	Kit Miles			
	Arthur James Mills	1884	1954	
	Raymond Frederic Monaghan	1898	1966	
Brigadier	Michael Moon			
	Guy Newton Moore	1893	1984	
	George Moran			
Brigadier	Gerald Vincent Moriarty	1894	1966	
	Murray John Moten	1899	1953	
Brigadier	Thomas Murdoch	1876	1961	
Brigadier	Allan A. Murray	1960		Commander 8th Brigade Dec 2011 – Dec 2014
Brigadier	Tom Nairn			
	Edward Michael Neylan	1896	1967	
Brigadier	Andrew Nikolic	1961		
	Reginald Havill Norman	1893	1973	
	Frank Kingsley Norris	1893	1984	
	Francis Roger North	1894	1978	
	Harry Scott Nurse	1896	1981	
Brigadier	David O'Brien			
	John William Alexander O'Brien	1908	1980	
	Douglas Paine	1892	1960	
	William Edward Hill Pascoe	1893	1956	
Brigadier	Cheryl Pearce			
Brigadier	Matthew Pearse			
Brigadier	Michael Phelps			
Brigadier	Arnold Potts	1896	1968	
Brigadier	Michael Prictor	1962		
	Claude Esdaile Prior	1895	1954	
	Ralph Carlyle Geoffrey Prisk	1894	1960	
	Beauchamp Worters Pulver	1897	1981	
Brigadier	Steve Quinn			
	John Herbert Rasmussen	1902	1952	
	John Reddish	1902	1971	
	John Dalylell Richardson	1880	1954	
	James Campbell Robertson	1878	1951	
	John David Rogers	1895	1978	
	Henry Gordon Rourke	1896	1973	
Brigadier	Raymond Sandover	1910	1995	
Brigadier	David Saul			Comd 17 Bde 2007–08, DGSL 2009–10
Brigadier	Ted Serong	1915	2002	
	Harry Blamyre Sewell	1896	1943	
Brigadier	Colin McOlvin Sharp			
	Edward Lonergan Sheehan	1898	1969	
	James Thomas Simpson	1898	1971	
Brigadier	Bob Slater	1943		
Brigadier	Mark Smethurst			
Brigadier	Andrew Smith			
	Andrew Smith			
Brigadier	Walter Edmond Smith	1895	1976	
	Fritz Peter Max Solling	1892	1985	
	Victor Paul Hildebrand Stantke	1886	1967	
	William Howard St. Clair	1892	1977	
	John Rowlstone Stevenson	1908	1971	
	Robert Mackay Stodart	1879	1956	
Brigadier	Jack Studdert	1923	2003	
Brigadier	Horace William Strutt	1903	1985	
	Roy Buchanan Sutherland	1897	1943	
Brigadier	Harold Taylor	1890	1966	
	Percy Chamberlin Thompson	1893	1972	
	Roy Meldrum Thompson	1895	1967	
	Edwin Tivey	1866	1947	
	Raymond Walter Tovell	1890	1966	
Brigadier	William Traynor			
	Doug Tyers	1952		
Brigadier	Walter Urquhart	1894	1985	
Brigadier	Arthur Varley	1893	1944	
Brigadier	William Veale	1895	1971	
Brigadier	Donald Veron	1907	1988	
Brigadier	Eric Vowles	1893	1977	
Brigadier	Jim Wallace			
Brigadier	Augustine Wardell	1895	1965	
Brigadier	Thomas Weavers	1892	1962	
Brigadier	David Welch			
Brigadier	Stuart Weir	1922	2004	
Brigadier	Frank Wells	1896	1963	
Brigadier	Allan Wendt	1892	1977	
Brigadier	David Whitehead	1886	1992	
Brigadier	Fred Whitelaw	1919		
Brigadier	Wilford Whittle	1892	1954	
Brigadier	Jeff Wilkinson			
Brigadier	Ernst Williams	1884	1959	
Brigadier	Kenneth Williams	1896	1974	
Brigadier	Ian Rignold Wills			Director General Supply Army
Brigadier	Kenneth Wills	1896	1977	
Brigadier	Robert Winning	1906	1971	
Brigadier	Frederick Wood	1906	1991	
Brigadier	Hugh Wrigley	1891	1980	

== See also ==
- List of Australian admirals and commodores
- List of Australian air marshals
- Category:Australian generals
- Category:Australian brigadiers
- Category:Royal Australian Navy admirals
- Category:Royal Australian Air Force air marshals
