= General Legge =

General Legge may refer to:

- Arthur Legge (British Army officer) (1800–1890), British Army general
- Barnwell R. Legge (1891–1949), U.S. Army brigadier general
- James Gordon Legge (1863–1947) was an Australian Army lieutenant general
- Stanley Legge (1900–1977), Australian Army major general
- William Kaye Legge (1869–1946), British Army brigadier general
