= Basil Andrew =

Australian Army officer

- Born: 15 October 1894; Melbourne, Australia
- Died: 28 April 1941 (aged 46); Alexandria, Egypt
- Education: Royal Military College, Duntroon
- Spouse: Ethyl Kate Petterd
- Military career
- Allegiance: Australia
- Branch: Australian Army
- Rank: Brigadier
- Service number: VX13755
- Conflicts: First World War; Second World War

Brigadier Basil John Andrew (15 October 1894 – 28 April 1941) was an officer in the Australian Army during both the First and Second World Wars. He was the Deputy Adjutant-General of I Australian Corps in Greece, before he died in Alexandria, Egypt, of a heart attack.

== Early years ==
Andrew was born in Melbourne, Victoria, on 15 October 1894, the son of John Arthur and Catherine Mary Andrew of Launceston, Tasmania. Educated at Scotch College, Launceston, upon graduation he entered the Royal Military College, Duntroon as an Australian Army officer cadet.

== Military career ==
Andrew was commissioned as an officer after the outbreak of the First World War, and was attached to the 12th Battalion of the Australian Imperial Force for active service overseas. By the war's end he had been promoted to captain.

Upon returning to Australia, Andrew was stationed at Launceston, then Western Australia, South Australia and Victoria. With the outbreak of the Second World War, he served with the Australian Staff Corps.

== Personal life ==
Andrew married Ethyl Kate Petterd. On 28 April 1941, he died of a heart attack and was survived by his wife Ethyl and his son John.

== See also ==
- List of Australian Army brigadiers
