= Archibald Allen =

Australian Army officer

Archibald Robert Allen
- Born: 20 October 1888; Nunhead, England
- Died: September 1961
- Military career
- Allegiance: Australia
- Branch: Australian Army
- Service years: 1914–1944
- Rank: Brigadier
- Commands: Western Reinforcement Training Centre (1944); Western Australia Lines of Communication Area Training Depots (1942–44); 3rd Infantry Brigade (1936–42); 43rd/48th Infantry Battalion (1931–36)
- Conflicts: First World War; Second World War
- Awards: Efficiency Decoration

Brigadier Archibald Robert Allen, ED (20 October 1888 – September 1961) was a senior Australian Army officer in the Second World War.

Allen is believed to have enlisted in the First World War on 16 September 1914 and was assigned to H Company in the 16th Battalion (according to the AIF Project website).

Between the wars Allen was the Commanding Officer 43rd/48th Infantry Battalion.

During the Second World War Allen was Commanding Officer of the 3rd Infantry Brigade (1936–1942), and Commandant of the Western Reinforcement Training Centre (1944). He retired in 1944.

== See also ==
- List of Australian Army brigadiers
