= Julius Bruche =

Australian Army officer (1873–1961)

Sir Julius Henry Bruche
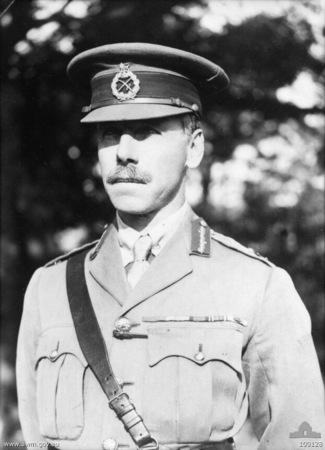
- Major General Sir Julius Bruche when Commandant of the Royal Military College, Duntroon, in 1931.
- Born: 6 March 1873; North Melbourne, Victoria
- Died: 28 April 1961 (aged 88); Melbourne, Victoria
- Military career
- Allegiance: Australia
- Branch: Australian Army
- Service years: 1891–1935
- Rank: Major General
- Commands: Chief of the General Staff (1931–35); Royal Military College, Duntroon (1931); 1st Military District (1920–25); 2nd Military District (1920–21); 5th Military District (1914–16)
- Conflicts: Second Boer War; First World War; Western Front
- Awards: Knight Commander of the Order of the Bath; Companion of the Order of St Michael and St George; Mentioned in Despatches (5)

Major General Sir Julius Henry Bruche KCB, CMG (6 March 1873 – 28 April 1961) was an Australian Army officer who undertook active service during the Second Boer War and First World War and eventually rose to the position of Chief of the General Staff (CGS) in 1931. He retired in 1935 and died in 1961, aged 88.

== Early life ==
Julius Bruche was born on 6 March 1873 in North Melbourne to German-born parents. His father was William Julius Maximilian Bruche—a corn merchant—while his mother was Elise Dorothea Henrietta Bruche (née Goetz). As a youth he attended Scotch College before progressing on to the University of Melbourne where he studied law. In 1898 he qualified as a barrister in the Supreme Court of Victoria, but made the decision to pursue a military career instead.

== Military career ==
In 1891 Bruche took a part-time commission in the 1st Battalion, Victorian Rifles, a militia unit, before transferring to the Permanent Military Forces in 1898. Initially he served as a lieutenant, but was promoted to captain in February 1899. During the early part of the Second Boer War he served on exchange with the British Army, attached to the 3rd Battalion, Grenadier Guards, before serving as quartermaster for the Australian regiment and then adjutant of the Victorian Mounted Rifles contingent. After returning to Australia in late 1900, he returned to South Africa late in the war, serving with the 2nd Battalion, Australian Commonwealth Horse.

After returning from South Africa he held a number of administrative and instructional appointments. In between these appointments Bruche was married to Dorothy Annette McFarland, whom he wed in Sydney on 12 April 1904, and with whom he subsequently had twin daughters. In 1906 he was promoted to major before undertaking another exchange positing with the British Army in 1910. This lasted for a year and on his return he was appointed as the Deputy Assistant Adjutant General in Tasmania. In July 1912 he was promoted to lieutenant colonel before being transferred to Queensland, where he eventually became the Assistant Adjutant General.

At the start of the First World War in the summer of 1914, concerns about Bruche's German heritage led to him not being accepted for overseas service in the First Australian Imperial Force (AIF) until June 1916 when he was appointed to the staff of the AIF headquarters in London.

Later he served on the staff of 5th Division in France as a temporary colonel where he worked closely with Lieutenant General John Monash. Monash is said to have thought highly of Bruche's administrative skills, so highly in fact that, following the end of hostilities in November 1918, he made Bruche director of the non-military employment scheme that was set up in England as part of the repatriation process to provide soldiers with civilian skills that they could use on their return to Australia.

Following his return to Australia in December 1919 Bruche was confirmed as a substantive colonel in 1920, before achieving the rank of major general in 1923. He then held a number of senior positions including commandant of the New South Wales and Queensland military districts, adjutant general of the Australian forces, senior military representative for Australia in London and on the Imperial General Staff and commandant of the Royal Military College, Duntroon. In October 1931 he became Chief of the General Staff (CGS), taking over from Major General Walter Coxen. His tenure was marked by the austerity of the economic downturn of the Great Depression, and the general malaise that crept into Australian strategic thinking at the time. He retired in 1935 at the rank of major general, being replaced as CGS by Lieutenant General John Lavarack.

Throughout his career Bruche received many honours including: the Companion of the Order of St Michael and St George (CMG), Companion of the Order of the Bath (CB), and Knight Commander of the Order of the Bath (KCB). During the First World War he was also mentioned in despatches five times.

== Death ==
Bruche died in Melbourne on 28 April 1961, at the age of 88. He was survived by his wife and one of their two daughters.

== Notes ==
Military offices
Preceded by Brigadier Francis Bede Heritage	Commandant of the Royal Military College, Duntroon; 1931	Succeeded by Lieutenant Colonel Douglas Henry Pratt
Preceded by Major General Walter Coxen	Chief of the General Staff; 1931–1935	Succeeded by Major General John Lavarack
