= Eric Fairweather Harrison =

Australian soldier and politician

Eric Harrison
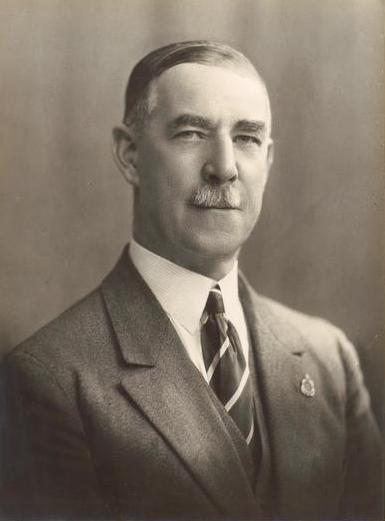

Member of the Australian Parliament for Bendigo
- In office 19 December 1931 – 21 September 1937
- Preceded by: Richard Keane
- Succeeded by: George Rankin

Personal details
- Born: 16 April 1880 Stanmore, New South Wales
- Died: 15 April 1948 (aged 67) Melbourne, Victoria
- Party: United Australia Party
- Spouse: Roma Wingfiled Zilla Clark
- Children: Brian Harrison
- Education: Cambridge University
- Occupation: Soldier

Military service
- Allegiance: Australia
- Branch/service: Australian Military Forces
- Years of service: 1903–1931; 1940–1942
- Rank: Brigadier
- Commands: Royal Military College, Duntroon
- Battles/wars: First World War; Second World War
- Awards: Mentioned in Despatches

Eric Fairweather Harrison (16 April 1880 – 15 April 1948) was an Australian soldier and politician.

== Early life ==
Harrison was born the son of English-born James Start Harrison in the Sydney suburb of Stanmore, New South Wales, and educated at Sydney Church of England Grammar School and Bedford School in England. He graduated from Trinity College, Cambridge with a Bachelor of Arts in 1901 and a Master of Arts in 1902. He was part of a Trinity crew which won the Thames Cup at Henley Royal Regatta.

== Military career ==
Harrison returned to Australia in 1903 and joined the militia garrison artillery in New South Wales. In April 1904, he was commissioned as a lieutenant in the Royal Australian Artillery. In 1910, he was the first Australian to attend the Staff College at Quetta, now in Pakistan.

Harrison was promoted to major in 1914 and at the commencement of the First World War was the duty staff officer at Army Headquarters and gave the instruction to fire across the bows of the SS Pfalz, the first shots fired by the British Empire during the war. He was subsequently appointed director of military training at army headquarters and, from October 1915, director of military art at the Royal Military College, Duntroon (RMC). In October 1917 he joined the Australian Imperial Force as a major and served in France at Hazebrouck, Strazeele, Flêtre and on the Somme. In September 1918 he took part in the Battle of the Hindenburg Line. He was made brevet lieutenant-colonel in January 1919 and mentioned in despatches in March.

Harrison married Roma Wingfield Zilla Clarke in November 1920. He was appointed commandant of the RMC in January 1929 and promoted colonel in July. He retired from the army in January 1931 and took up farming on the Mornington Peninsula.

== Politics and later life ==
Harrison won the seat of Bendigo for the United Australia Party in the 1931 election. He 1937 he failed to get party pre-selection for the new seat of Deakin.

In August 1940, Harrison was recalled from the reserve and reappointed as commandant of the RMC until his retirement in January 1942. He died in Melbourne, survived by his wife, a son and a daughter. His son, Brian was the member for Maldon in the British House of Commons from 1955 to 1974.

== Notes ==
Military offices
Preceded by Francis Bede Heritage	Commandant of the Royal Military College, Duntroon; 1929–1931	Succeeded by Francis Bede Heritage
Preceded by Eric Plant	Commandant of the Royal Military College, Duntroon; 1940–1942	Succeeded by Bertrand Combes
Parliament of Australia
Preceded by Richard Keane	Member for Bendigo; 1931–1937	Succeeded by George Rankin
