= Francis Bede Heritage =

Australian soldier

- Born: 21 September 1877; Don, Tasmania
- Died: 9 July 1934 (aged 56); Melbourne, Victoria
- Burial place: Melbourne General Cemetery, Melbourne, Victoria
- Military career
- Allegiance: Australia
- Branch: Australian Army
- Service years: 1897–1934
- Rank: Brigadier
- Commands: 2nd Military District; Royal Military College, Duntroon; 5th Military District
- Conflicts: Second Boer War; First World War
- Awards: Commander of the Order of the British Empire; Member of the Fourth Class of the Royal Victorian Order; Croix de Guerre (France)

Brigadier Francis Bede Heritage, CBE, MVO (21 September 1877 – 9 July 1934) was an Australian soldier who served during the Second Boer War and First World War.

Francis was the eldest son of George Thomas Henry Heritage, teacher and soldier, and his wife Eleanor Boyce, née Hadfield.

During the Second Boer War, he was an officer of the 1st Australian Regiment, and later commanded the Tasmanian contingent. Heritage was a commandant several times of the Royal Military College, Duntroon.

Military offices
Preceded by James Gordon Legge	Commandant of the Royal Military College, Duntroon; 1922–1929	Succeeded by Eric Fairweather Harrison
Preceded by Eric Fairweather Harrison	Commandant of the Royal Military College, Duntroon; 1931	Succeeded by Julius Bruche
Preceded by Douglas Henry Pratt	Commandant of the Royal Military College, Duntroon; 1931–1932	Succeeded by John Lavarack
