= John Lavarack =

Australian general and Governor of Queensland

Lieutenant General Sir John Lavarack KCMG, KCVO, KBE, CB, DSO
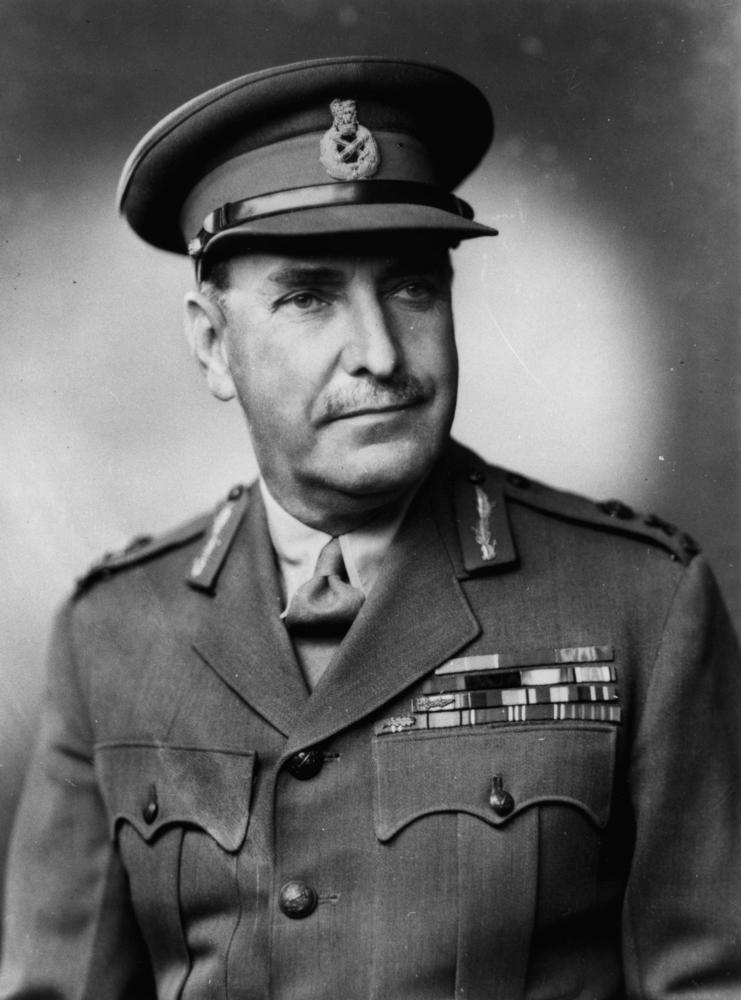

16th Governor of Queensland
- In office 1 October 1946 – September 1957
- Monarchs: George VI; Elizabeth II
- Premier: Ned Hanlon; Vince Gair; Sir Frank Nicklin
- Preceded by: Sir Leslie Wilson
- Succeeded by: Sir Henry Abel Smith

Personal details
- Born: 19 December 1885 Kangaroo Point, Queensland
- Died: 4 December 1957 (aged 71) Buderim, Queensland
- Spouse: Sybil Nevett Ochiltree
- Children: John Ochiltree Lavarack, Peter Lavarack, James Wallace Lavarack (co-discoverer of the Gulf snapping turtle)
- Profession: Soldier

Military service
- Allegiance: Australia
- Branch/service: Australian Army
- Years of service: 1905–1946
- Rank: Lieutenant general
- Commands: First Army (1942–44); I Corps (1941–42); 7th Division (1940–41); Southern Command (1939–40); 3rd Military District (1939–40); Chief of the General Staff (1935–39); Royal Military College, Duntroon (1933–35)
- Battles/wars: First World War; Balkans Campaign; Western Front; Battle of the Somme; Battle of Pozières; Battle of Amiens; Battle of Hamel; Second World War; North African Campaign; Siege of Tobruk; Syria-Lebanon Campaign
- Awards: Knight Commander of the Order of St Michael and St George; Knight Commander of the Royal Victorian Order; Knight Commander of the Order of the British Empire; Companion of the Order of the Bath; Distinguished Service Order; Mentioned in Despatches (4); Croix de guerre (France)

Lieutenant General Sir John Dudley Lavarack, KCMG, KCVO, KBE, CB, DSO (19 December 1885 – 4 December 1957) was an Australian Army officer who was the first Australian-born Governor of Queensland, serving from 1 October 1946 to 4 December 1957.

== Early life ==
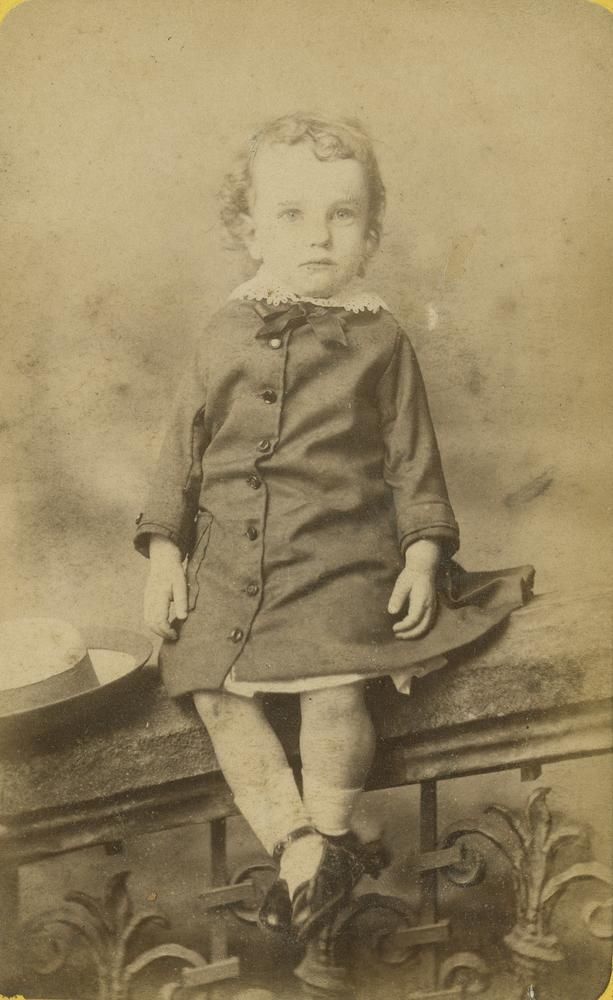
John Dudley Lavarack, circa 1887

Lavarack was born in Kangaroo Point, a suburb of Brisbane in Queensland, on 19 December 1885. He was educated at Brisbane Grammar School, where he excelled in the school's army cadets program.

== Military career ==
=== First World War ===
On 7 August 1905, Lavarack was commissioned as a lieutenant in the Royal Australian Artillery.

In early 1913, he trained as an officer at the Staff College, Camberley in England, and upon the outbreak of the First World War was assigned first to the War Office as a general staff officer, grade 3 (GSO3), then in February 1915 as a brigade major of the 22nd Division artillery. Lavarack's division spent a month in France during September 1915, but was transferred to Salonica in Greece, where it fought in the Balkans Campaign.

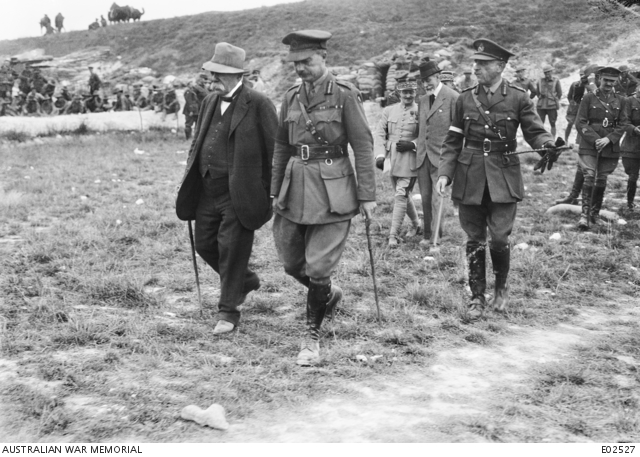
Georges Clemenceau, premier of France (left), whilst on his only visit to the Australian front, in July 1918, walking with Major General Ewen Sinclair-MacLagan, GOC 4th Australian Division, and Lieutenant General Sir John Monash, GOC Australian Corps (right, foreground). At far right is Lieutenant Colonel Lavarack, the division's GSO1.

In February 1915, Lavarack was assigned to the Australian Imperial Force, but did not join it until July 1916 when he joined the Australian 2nd Division for the Battle of Pozières. He was subsequently assigned as brigade major for the 5th Division, commanding two field artillery batteries during fighting at the Somme and the advance on the Hindenburg Line. In May 1917, his staff college training saw him transferred to 1st Division headquarters, which instigated a lifelong mutual antagonism between Lavarack and his superior at HQ, Thomas Blamey.

By December 1917, Lavarack was a lieutenant colonel and general staff officer, 1st grade, in the Australian 4th Division, and took part in battles at Dernancourt, Villers-Bretonneux, Hamel and Amiens, with Lavarack's hand in planning for the Battle of Hamel setting the stage for several subsequent Australian victories.

=== Between the wars ===
After the war, Lavarack returned to Australia, where he took up a post at the Royal Military College, Duntroon. In 1926, he was promoted to brevet colonel, and in 1927 attended the Imperial Defence College in London. Back in Australia in 1929, he found himself in heavy debate with fellow IDC student Frederick Shedden over the Australian government's adoption of the "Singapore strategy". Shedden believed that the presence of the British Royal Navy in Singapore would deter any aggression from Japan, whilst Lavarack was sure that Japan would take advantage of Britain's focus on Europe and that Australian ground forces should prepare for a possible invasion. In 1928, Lavarack was ordered to start making plans for a possible war with Japan, which he began with a paper questioning the Singapore Strategy and argued that the Australian Army needed "mobile land forces" to counter a Japanese invasion or raids. In a paper written in 1929, Lavarack predicted that Japan would only attack the British empire if Britain were involved in a major European war, which would put into question the entire assumptions behind the Singapore strategy, namely that the British would be able to move the main battle fleet to Singapore in the event of a Japanese threat.

In January 1933, Lavarack was made commandant of the Royal Military College, Duntroon. On 21 April 1935, with a temporary promotion to major general (later made permanent in June), he was appointed Chief of the General Staff (CGS), the head of the Australian Army. As CGS, Lavarack pulled no punches over what he saw as an over-reliance on the Royal Navy and neglect of Australia's land forces—renewing his argument with Shedden, and causing considerable friction with the Australian government, in particular a number of successive ministers for Defence.

In 1931, Japan seized the Manchuria region of China and throughout the 1930s the Japanese grew increasingly strident in insisting all of the Asia-Pacific region belonged to Japan. Australia's defence strategy was based around the Singapore Strategy, where it was envisioned in the threat of trouble from Japan that Britain would send the majority of the British battle fleet to Singapore, the main British naval base in Asia, to block any Japanese advance into southeast Asia. Lavarack had serious doubts about how practical it would be to activate the Singapore strategy, and wrote in 1935 that his motto was "trust in the navy, but keep your powder dry". He was critical of the Royal Australian Navy as he wrote that with the RAN did "not think it necessary to have any powder of their own, much less keep it dry". Much to the displeasure of several Defence ministers, Lavarack argued that the Australian Army needed a mobile force to defend Australia against a Japanese invasion, an issue which was overruled on. The Minister of Defence, Senator George Pearce, ruled that the Australian Army was to concentrate on coastal defence and build several batteries of coastal artillery at and near major cities such as Sydney, Brisbane, and Fremantle, which was done more to reassure the public than anything else. Lavarck charged that unwillingness of the government to buy anti-aircraft guns negated the coastal artillery batteries as he argued that the Japanese would take out the batteries via air strikes before bringing their ships within range of the coastal artillery. He strongly argued that the best defense for Australia was a highly mobile Army that would be able to meet the Japanese whatever they landed, instead of assuming that the Japanese would land at Sydney, Brisbane and Fremantle. The Australian cabinet believed that the British claims that Singapore was a massive fortress that the Japanese could never take, and as such the Japanese would never attempt an invasion of Australia with the Royal Navy operating out of Singapore. At most, it was felt that the Japanese were only capable of naval raids, and the Imperial Japanese Navy would never send capital ships so far south as long as Singapore held out. By contrast, Lavarack argued that the Australian Army needed more officers trained in staff work; more equipment and that the militia needed more training as he thought that the assumptions behind the Singapore strategy were flawed.

=== Second World War ===
In 1938, British officer Lieutenant General Ernest Squires was appointed Inspector-General of the Australian Military Forces. Lavarack and Squires worked together to prepare Australia for war, and by the time Lavarack returned from a tour of Britain, the Second World War had begun. During the debates about the proper defence policy to be followed, Blamey won the favor of the government by praising "the efficacy of their plans", which was a more congenial argument for the government than Lavarack's stark warnings that Australia was exposed to an invasion. One of the few ministers in the cabinet, the former prime minister Billy Hughes was now serving as minister for external affairs stated at a meeting of the Council of Defence "...whether anyone could show that Singapore was impregnable or could be made so. If it proved vulnerable, and we were relying upon Singapore to keep the enemy at a distance, we were certainly living in a fool's paradise". At a meeting in February 1938 of the Council of Defense, Blamey stated it was "reasonable to assume an invasion was unlikely" while Lavarack argued that Japan was "prepared to take risks" and an invasion was possible. At another meeting of the Council of Defence in March 1939, Blamey and Lavarack clashed again about whatever Japan would make raids upon the Australian coast or launch an invasion along with debates just how ready the Militia was for war. Shedden, the Defence Secretary much preferred Blamey's views to Lavarack's, and in 1939 used his considerable influence to ensure that Blamey had command of the 2nd Australian Imperial Force.

With Squires replacing him as CGS, Lavarack was promoted to lieutenant general and made General Officer Commanding Southern Command. In 1940, Lavarack was considered to command 6th Division, but Thomas Blamey, now the commander of I Corps, refused his appointment, citing "defects of character". Lavarack instead took command of the newly formed 7th Division, also accepting a demotion to major general which was almost certainly instigated by Blamey. Blamey and Lavarack strongly disliked each other. In 1925, Blamey was serving as the commissioner of the Victoria State Police, and a scandal erupted when during a police raid on a Fitzroy brothel his badge was found on the premises. Blamey always insisted that his badge had been stolen, but Lavarack expressed the viewpoint that the reason why Blamey's badge was found in a brothel was because Blamey had been visiting the brothel. The British commander-in-chief in the Middle East, General Sir Archibald Wavell, had selected the 7th Division under Lavarack to be the first Australian division to go to Greece, which caused a notable dispute between Wavell vs. Blamey who insisted that the 6th Australian division to be the first to go to Greece as he claimed that the 6th Division was the one most ready to face the Wehrmacht. As Blamey was the senior Australian general in the Middle East, Wavell bowed to his wishes to have the 6th Division be the first to go to Greece, though many believed that the real reason for Blamey's objections was that he disliked Lavarack.

In 1941, Wavell ordered Lavarack to Tobruk, where his units were successful in repelling Erwin Rommel's forces. At the beginning of April 1941, Lavarack was supervising the embarkation of the 7th Division at Alexandria upon ships intended to take his division to Greece, when Wavell ordered him to stop the embarkation and send the 7th Division to the Western Desert, where the Afrikakorps had advancing rapidly. At a conference in Cairo on 6 April 1941, Wavell decided if the Australians could hold Tobruk, the advance of the Afrikakorps towards Alexandria could be stopped as Rommel would need the port of Tobruk to bring in supplies to continue his advance. As the 9th Australian Division was the force selected to hold Tobruk, Wavell thought it best to have an Australian general in command in the Western Desert and chose Laverack. On 7 April 1941, Wavell informed Lavarack that the 2nd British Armoured Division had lost most of its tanks and the 9th Australian Division had been ordered back to Tobruk. On 8 April, Wavell and Lavarack visited Tobruk to meet General Leslie Morshead, the GOC of the 9th Australian Division. Lavarack reported to Wavell that the Tobruk had enough supplies to withstand a siege for at least four months; that morale was high among the Australian troops; and the defensive works around Tobruk could withstand a siege. Wavell like Morshead preferred to hold the inner defensive line around Tobruk, known as the Blue Line, but Lavarack chose the longer 28-mile long outer defensive line known as the Red Line under the grounds it was the stronger line. Wavell requested Lavarack take command of the Western Desert Force, but he was once again confounded by Blamey, who insisted that he was unsuitable for high command. After further successes in the Syria-Lebanon campaign, Lavarack was re-promoted to lieutenant general, and took over Blamey's role as commander of I Corps, with Blamey now deputy commander-in-chief in the Middle East.

Following the outbreak of war with Japan, I Corps was shifted to the Far East, arriving in Java in January 1942. On 27 January 1942, Lavarack met Wavell at his headquarters at Bandung, where Wavell informed him that the Japanese were advancing too fast down Malaya and the best that could hoped for was the Allies would be able to hold Singapore. The 1st Australian Corps, which comprised the 6th and 7th Divisions, had ordered out of Egypt to return for the defence of Australia. Wavell planned to send one Australian division to hold Sumatra and another to hold Java. Lavarack strongly protested against Wavell's plans, saying it would be better if the 1st Corps stayed together, saying the Netherlands East Indies Army was unreliable and it would better if the two Australian divisions stayed together. Lavarack was highly critical of the Netherlands East Indies Army, which he stated was ill-trained, poorly armed, immobile, and of questionable loyalty as most of the Indonesian troops were in a near-mutinous state against their Dutch officers. Lavarack predicted that the Indonesian troops would not fight against their fellow Asians as the Japanese slogan of "Asia for Asians!" was popular with the Indonesians, and that the Australians would have to do the brunt of the fighting.

The lead element of the corps, a force of two battalions, reached Batavia, the capital of the Dutch East Indies, on 16 February 1942. The mood was especially tense as the Japanese had taken Singapore the day before. Lavarack sent a cable to Canberra advising the prime minister, John Curtin, against landing in Java under the grounds that the defence of the Dutch East Indies was hopeless and any troops landed in Java would be lost. The cabinet decided to go ahead with the landings in Batavia against Lavarack's advice, but not to send any more troops to Java. Lavarack supported Wavell in plans to send the 1st Corps to Burma, though he was careful not to stress this point to Curtin as he instead stated the defence of the Netherlands East Indies was hopeless and it would be wise not to send any more troops to the East Indies. Lavarack favoured holding Burma to keep the Burma Road open, and thereby keep China in the war. The majority of the Imperial Japanese Army for the duration of World War Two was deployed in China, and like other Allied generals Lavarack felt that keeping the Japanese bogged down in China was the best way of halting their advance in the Asia-Pacific region. Lavarack continued to protest against Wavell's plans to try hold Java, saying it was only a matter of time before the Japanese conquered Java. On 18 February 1942, 2, 920 Australian troops landed in Batavia over Lavarack's protests. On 19 February 1942, the Japanese bombed Darwin, which led for the Curtin cabinet to decide on having 1st corps return to Australia, leaving the two battalions sent to Java on their own to face the Japanese. On 22 February 1942, the two battalions in Java were named "Blackforce" after their commander, Brigadier Arthur Blackburn. As Lavarack had predicted, both battalions were lost and the men of the battalions spent the rest of the war in Japanese POW camps. On 22 February 1942, Lavarack left Java and returned to Australia.

Lavarack was recalled to Australia, where he was made acting commander-in-chief of Australian forces whilst waiting for Blamey to return from the Middle East to fill the role. He then commanded the Australian First Army, with responsibility for defending Queensland and New South Wales. Upon his return to Australia, Lavarack changed his views and supported Curtin's call to return the 1st Corps for the defence of Australia as he argued that the defences of Australia were far weaker than he had been led to believe. He also lobbied hard to have the Australians in Java pulled out before Java was lost. In 1944, he flew to the United States where he became head of the Australian Military Mission, and was military advisor for Australia to the United Nations Conference on International Organization. He returned to Australia in August 1946, and frustrated by his lack of active command and constantly being passed over by Blamey and others, he retired from the military in September that year.

== Governor of Queensland ==
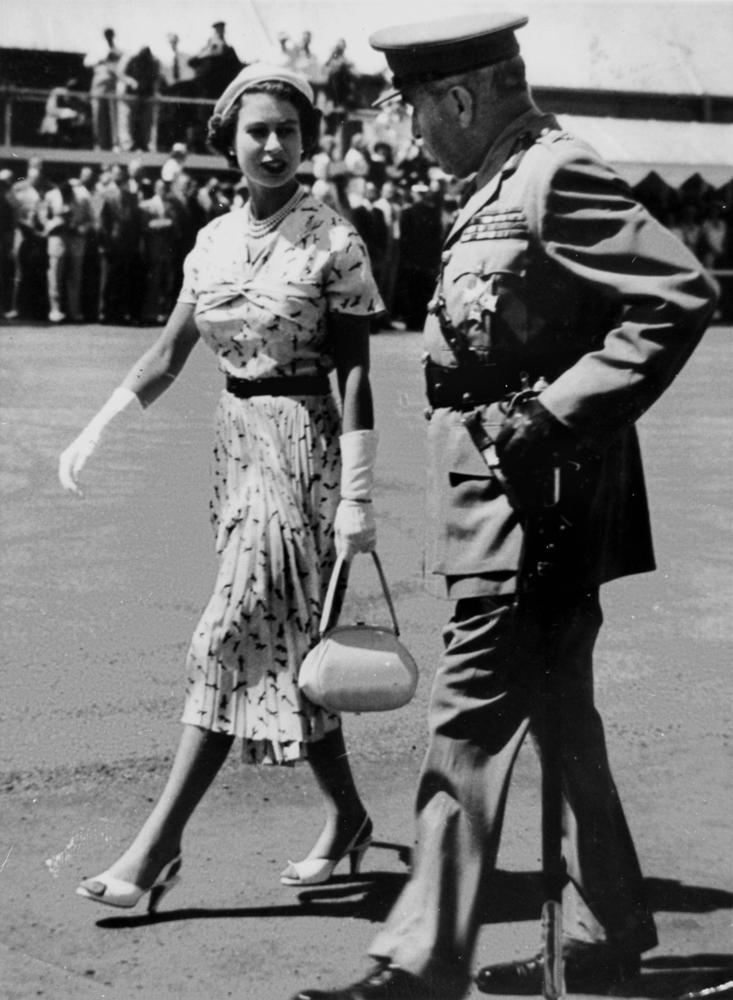
Governor Lavarack with Queen Elizabeth II, 1954

In 1946, the Premier of Queensland, Ned Hanlon, offered the post of Governor of Queensland to Lieutenant General Sir Leslie Morshead, who declined. Hanlon then offered the post to Lavarack, who accepted and was sworn in on 1 October—the second Australian-born person to hold a governorship in Australia (Sir John Northcott had been made Governor of New South Wales two months previously). After completing his five-year term in 1951, Lavarack's governorship was extended by another five years to 1956. In February 1952, he proclaimed Queen Elizabeth II as the monarch in Queensland, following the death of her father King George VI. Lavarack's oath of allegiance and oath of office were then re-administered (at his request) to reflect the new monarch. He was then reappointed for a further year from 1 October 1956, but due to ill health, Lavarack only served four months of the extended term, and was relieved of his duties on 25 January 1957 by his lieutenant governor, although he officially remained governor until September 1957.

== Later life ==
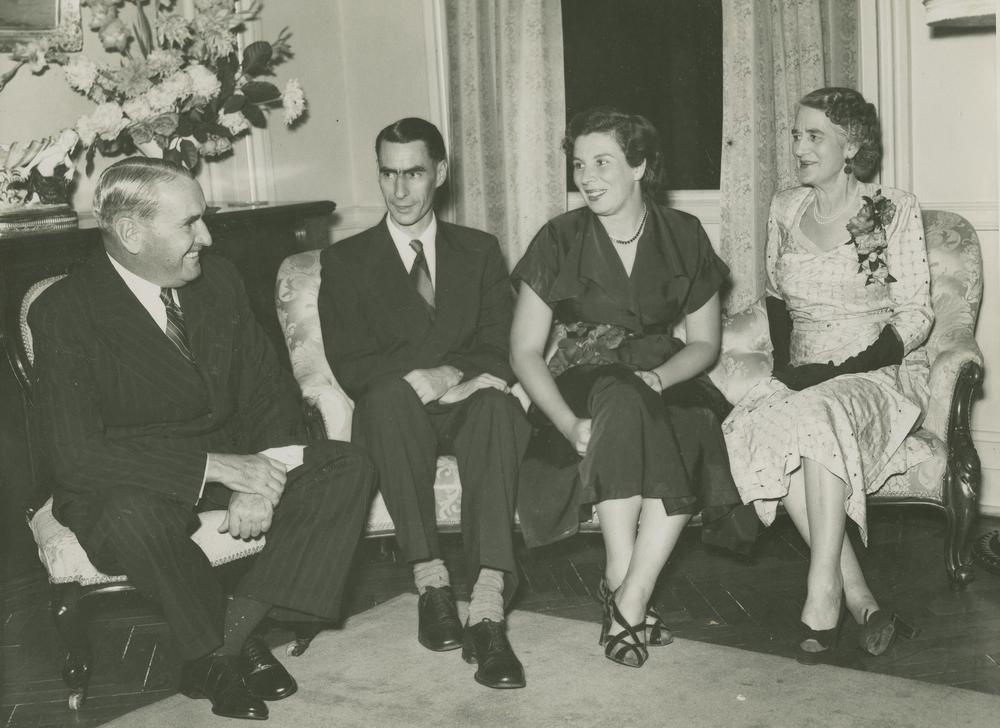
Left to right: Sir John Lavarack, his son Jim and daughter-in-law Sue, and his wife Sybil, Lady Lavarack at Government House, Brisbane circa 1954.

Lavarack retired to his home in Buderim on a pension of £1000 per annum. On 4 December 1957, he collapsed at the breakfast table and died. He was survived by his wife and three sons. A state funeral was held on 5 December 1957.

== Honours ==
For his service during the First World War, Lavarack was awarded the Distinguished Service Order (1918) and the French Croix de guerre (1919). He was appointed a Companion of the Order of St Michael and St George in 1919, and Mentioned in Despatches three times.

In 1942, following I Corps' actions in the Syria-Lebanon Campaign, he was appointed a Knight Commander of the Order of the British Empire (KBE). He was appointed a Knight Commander of the Royal Victorian Order in 1954 and a Knight Commander of the Order of St Michael and St George in 1955 while Governor of Queensland.

The Lavarack Barracks in Townsville, Queensland were named in his honour.

== Books ==
- Horner, David (2021). Strategy and Command Issues in Australia's Twentieth-century Wars. Cambridge: Cambridge University Press. ISBN 9781316512371.
- Lodge, Brett (2021). Lavarack: Rival General. Sydney: Robinson Reynolds. ISBN 191497350X.

Military offices
New command	GOC First Army; 1942–1944	Succeeded by Lieutenant General Vernon Sturdee
Preceded by Lieutenant General Sir Thomas Blamey	GOC I Corps; 1941–1942	Succeeded by Lieutenant General Sydney Rowell
Preceded by Major General Sir Julius Bruche	Chief of the General Staff; 1935–1939	Succeeded by Lieutenant General Ernest Squires
Preceded by Brigadier Francis Bede Heritage	Commandant of the Royal Military College, Duntroon; 1933–1935	Succeeded by Brigadier Charles Miles
Government offices
Preceded by Sir Leslie Wilson	Governor of Queensland; 1946–1957	Succeeded by Sir Henry Abel Smith
