= Reginald Havill Norman =

Australian Army officer

- Born: 10 October 1893; Kent Town, South Australia, Australia
- Died: 28 August 1973 (aged 79); Melbourne, Victoria, Australia
- Spouse: Narelle Bessie Brunker Sherbon (m. 1920)
- Children: 1 daughter
- Military career
- Allegiance: Australia
- Branch: Citizen Military Forces; Australian Naval and Military Expeditionary Force; Australian Imperial Force
- Rank: Brigadier
- Conflicts: First World War; Occupation of German New Guinea; Gallipoli campaign; Western Front; Battle of Pozières; Battle of Passchendaele; Second World War
- Awards: Distinguished Service Order; Military Cross; Colonial Auxiliary Forces Officers' Decoration; Mentioned in Despatches (2); Croix de Guerre (Belgium)

Brigadier Reginald Havill Norman, DSO, MC, VD (10 October 1893 – 28 August 1973) was a decorated senior officer in the Australian Army and a ship-owner. With "an alert and energetic personality and a brisk demeanour," he was "widely known and respected in shipping, military and social circles both in Victoria and other states of the Commonwealth."

== Early life ==
Reginald Havill Norman was born in Kent Town, a suburb of Adelaide, on 10 October 1893, the only child of Frederick John Havill Norman (1862–1926) by his marriage in 1892 to Elizabeth Maria Richardson (1862–1947).

Norman served for 18 months as the adjutant of the 78th Infantry Battalion of the Adelaide Rifles. He subsequently moved to Sydney to begin serving with the 18th Infantry Battalion.

== First World War ==
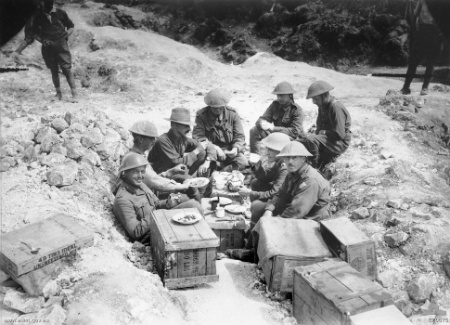
Brigadier General John Gellibrand (wearing a hat) and his staff having breakfast in a shell hole in Sausage Valley, August 1916. In the background is Major R. H. Norman.

17 days after the outbreak of the First World War, on 14 August 1914, Norman applied for a commission with the Australian Naval and Military Expeditionary Force (AN&MEF) in Sydney. He was appointed as a second lieutenant and left from Cockatoo Island aboard HMAT Berrima the following day. Fighting began on 11 September in German New Guinea, with German forces surrendering the following day. Norman was appointed as the garrison adjutant on 2 October. He was promoted to the rank of lieutenant on 1 January 1915 and was appointed as a staff officer on 14 January. On 4 March, he was discharged from the AN&MEF.

Norman was given the rank of second lieutenant in the 5th Infantry Brigade after applying for a commission in the Australian Imperial Force. He left Sydney for Egypt on 12 May and was promoted to the rank of captain on 1 June. He accompanied the 5th Infantry Brigade to Gallipoli, serving in its staff until 11 December, when he transferred to the 6th Infantry Brigade headquarters as staff captain. He was recommended for a Military Cross (MC) in recognition of his "outstanding organisational ability and leadership during the evacuation of Gallipoli". Following the evacuation of Gallipoli, Norman was withdrawn to Egypt and, following a reorganisation of the Australian Imperial Force, was sent to the Western Front. He subsequently took part in the Battle of Pozières, during which he was again recommended for the MC. It was noted that he should be recognised "for not only doing his own work, but acting for the Brigade Major as well," for which he was also mentioned in despatches. In September, he was again recommended for the MC.

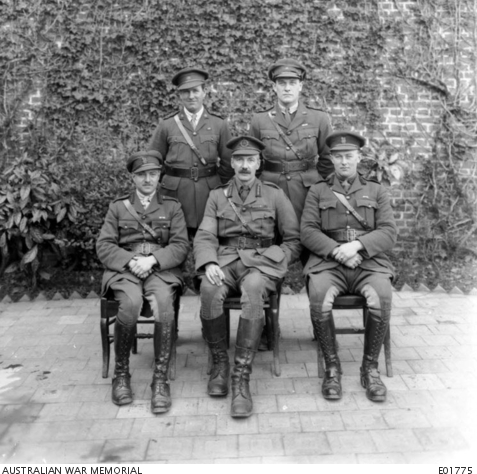
Norman (front left) with the officers of the 12th Brigade, 6 March 1918.

In November 1916, Norman resumed serving in the 5th Infantry Brigade, now a brigade major. On 21 January 1917, he returned to the 6th Brigade with the same rank. On 11 April, he was wounded in the hand and taken to England for treatment. He was awarded the MC on 5 June, the day before he was to return to France. He transferred to the 48th Battalion on 23 November and was promoted to the rank of major the following day, at which point he was seconded to the 12th Infantry Brigade headquarters. After fighting ceased at the Battle of Passchendaele (during which Norman was again mentioned in despatches), the 12th Brigade returned to France to curb the German spring offensive.

Norman kept a diary during this part of the war, covering his service from 1 October to 4 November 1916 while with the 6th Australian Infantry Brigade and from 24 July to 19 September 1917. These entries record the weather, equipment, movements, and reinforcements, with a few pencilled sketches. It ends with preparations for the Battle of Passchendaele, referred to him as the "big show".

Norman was awarded the Distinguished Service Order (DSO) during the Allied advance on 8 August. The citation for the award reads as follows:

For conspicuous gallantry and devotion to duty under heavy artillery and machine gun fire; this officer went forward and got into touch with advanced troops, ascertaining their position and establishing liaison between units. He was untiring in his efforts to promote the success of the operation.

On 25 September, he was briefly seconded to the United States Army, and returned to the 12th Brigade on 2 October, where he was again posted, this time to an officers course at the University of Cambridge, which he left in January 1919, by which time the armistice with Germany in November had brought an end to the war.

On 5 April, he was awarded the Belgian Croix de Guerre for contributions to the Allied advance on 8 August 1918. He was discharged from the Australian Imperial Force later that month.

== Second World War ==
Norman continued to serve with the Citizen Military Forces (CMF) in the interwar period. Following the outbreak of the Second World War in 1939, he was mobilised in South Melbourne, remaining within Australia throughout the war. For most of the war, he served at Land Force Headquarters as Deputy Quartermaster-General in charge of Movements and Transportation. He ceased full time duties on 30 May 1945 with the rank of brigadier.

== Later career ==
Following his return to civil life, Norman held various appointments at the Melbourne, Sydney and Perth branches of the Orient Steam Navigation Company until he was appointed branch manager of the company in Melbourne in 1938. He was elected as Chairman of the Overseas Shipping Representatives' Association in Melbourne, and was a Trustee of the Melbourne Sailors' Home and a member of the Council of St. Catherine's School.

During a session in Parliament in 1958, John Cramer paid tribute to Norman as a trustee of the Imperial Force Canteens Funds Trust.

== Personal life ==
Norman married Narelle Bessie Brunker Sherbon, daughter of Major William James Sherbon and Mary Ann Elizabeth Brunker (daughter of James Brunker), on 20 October 1920 in St James' Church, Sydney. They had one daughter, Rosemary Havill Norman.

He was a member of the Royal Melbourne Golf Club.

== See also ==
- List of Australian Army brigadiers
