= Charles Miles (general) =

Australian Army officer (1884–1958)

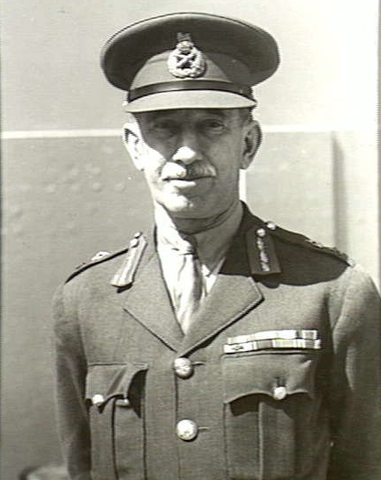
- Lieutenant General C.G.N. Miles in 1941
- Born: 10 November 1884; Brisbane, Queensland
- Died: 18 February 1958 (aged 73)
- Military career
- Allegiance: Australia
- Branch: Australian Army
- Service years: 1904–1941
- Rank: Lieutenant General
- Commands: Eastern Command (1940–41); Royal Military College, Duntroon (1935–39)
- Conflicts: First World War; Second World War
- Awards: Companion of the Order of St Michael and St George; Distinguished Service Order; Mentioned in Despatches (5); Order of Saint Stanislaus, 3rd Class with Swords (Russia)

Lieutenant General Charles George Norman Miles, CMG, DSO (10 November 1884 – 18 February 1958), commonly known as C.G.N. Miles, was a senior officer in the Australian Army during the Second World War. Miles was Commandant of the Royal Military College, Duntroon from 1935 to 1939 and Adjutant General from 1939 to 1940, before succeeding Lieutenant General Vernon Sturdee as General Officer Commanding Eastern Command in June 1940.

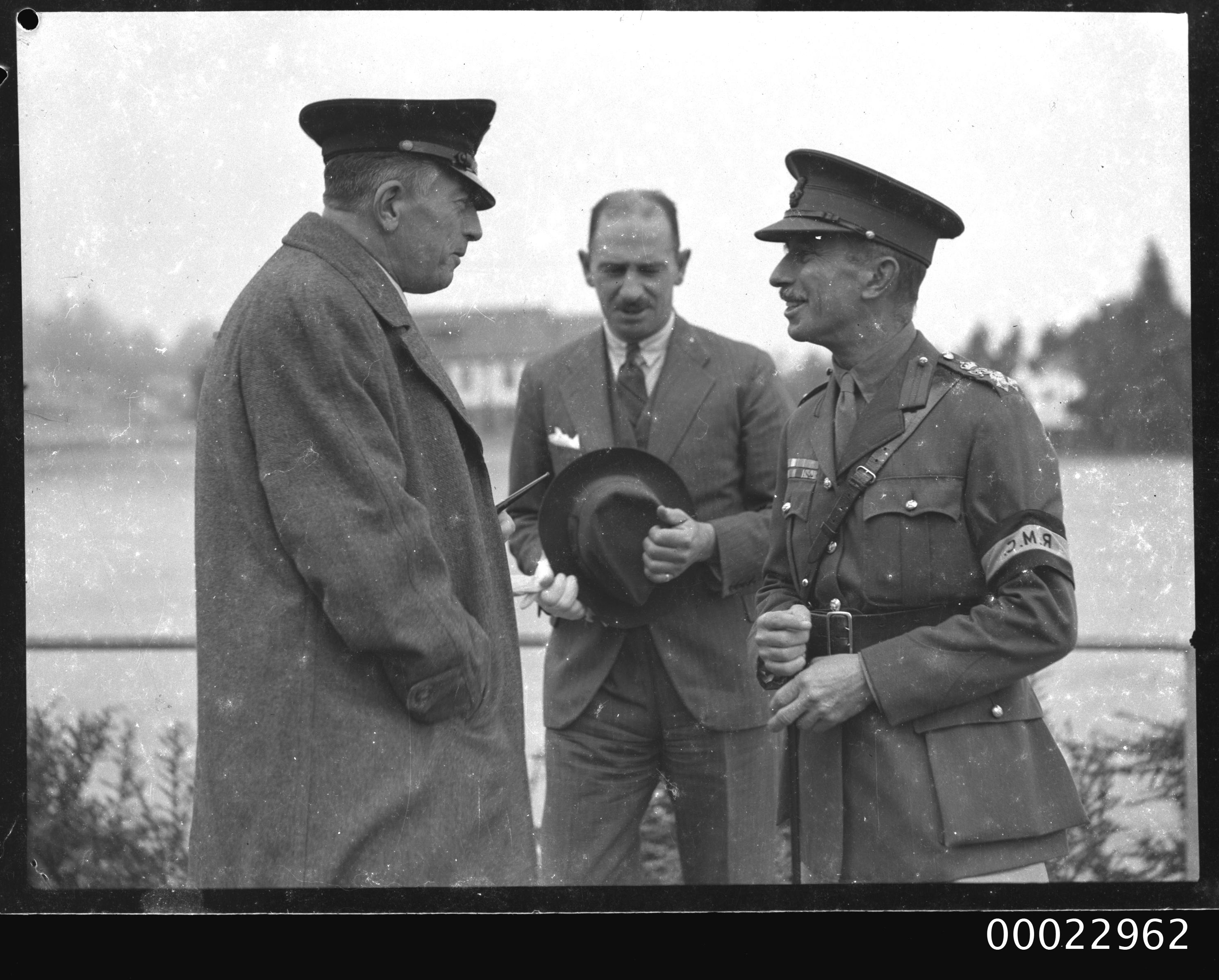
This photograph depicts Count Felix Graf von Luckner, in trench coat, opposite Brigadier-General C G N Miles, Commandant of the Royal Military College of Duntroon in Canberra, Australian Capital Territory. It was taken during the count's visit to the college on Saturday, 4 June 1938.

He was granted the local rank of lieutenant colonel while serving with Imperial Troops in India in February 1927.

Military offices
Preceded by Lieutenant General Vernon Sturdee	General Officer Commanding Eastern Command; 1940–1941	Succeeded by Lieutenant General Henry Wynter
Preceded by Colonel John Lavarack	Commandant of the Royal Military College, Duntroon; 1935–1939	Succeeded by Brigadier Eric Plant
