= Douglas Henry Pratt =

British soldier

Major-General Douglas Henry Pratt CB DSO MC
- Born: 7 October 1892; Jaunpur, India
- Died: 14 May 1958 (aged 65)
- Military career
- Allegiance: United Kingdom
- Branch: British Army
- Service years: 1911–1946
- Rank: Major-General
- Service number: 4584
- Units: Royal Irish Regiment; Royal Tank Regiment
- Commands: 1st Army Tank Brigade (1939–40); 2nd Royal Tank Regiment (1936–38); Royal Military College, Duntroon (1931)
- Conflicts: First World War; Second World War
- Awards: Companion of the Order of the Bath; Distinguished Service Order; Military Cross; Mentioned in Despatches (3); Legion of Merit (United States)

Major-General Douglas Henry Pratt, CB, DSO, MC (7 October 1892 – 14 May 1958) was a British Army officer who served in the First and Second World Wars.

== Military career ==
Douglas Henry Pratt was born in British India on 7 October 1892 and was sent to England, where he was initially educated at Dover College and later entered the Royal Military College, Sandhurst, from where he was commissioned as a second lieutenant into the Royal Irish Regiment on 20 September 1911. The first three years of Pratt's military career were spent in British India, until the outbreak of the First World War in August 1914. He received a promotion to the rank of lieutenant on 15 April 1914.

Pratt spent the First World War in Belgium and France. By the war's end in 1918 he had been awarded the Military Cross and the Distinguished Service Order (DSO), mentioned in despatches three times and, in 1916, had transferred to the Tank Corps, later the Royal Tank Regiment. The citation for his DSO, gazetted in July 1918, reads as follows:

For conspicuous gallantry and devotion to duty in an attack. It was largely owing to his careful preparations and excellent leadership that his tanks were successful in reaching all their objectives. He directed the operations on foot, going forward in front of the infantry and in the face of strong opposition. He never spared himself, and showed the greatest courage and contempt for danger.

Continuing his military service into the interwar period, Pratt attended the Staff College, Camberley, from 1923 to 1924 and served as a staff officer with the 42nd (East Lancashire) Infantry Division from 1926 to 1928. Pratt served on exchange with the Australian Army and was appointed as the commandant of Royal Military College, Duntroon, in 1931. He is the only non-Australian officer to have served in the role. Returning to England, he served on the staff at the War Office from 1934 to 1935 and later commanded the 2nd Battalion, Royal Tank Corps until 1937. The following year he returned to the War Office, this time as Assistant Director of Mechanization.

Remaining in this position until the outbreak of the Second World War in September 1939, Pratt was promoted the following month to be the commander of the 1st Army Tank Brigade, which became part of the British Expeditionary Force (BEF) in France. The tank brigade fought against the Germans in Belgium and Northern France, during the counter-attack at the Battle of Arras and the Allied retreat to Dunkirk.

After being evacuated from France, Pratt was promoted to major general and sent to Washington, D.C., in the United States, to become Major General Armoured Fighting Vehicles where it was largely due to him that the Sherman tank, which was then in development, was upgraded and up-gunned to British requirements. In 1943 he became Deputy Director of the British Supply Mission in Washington. The war ended in 1945, Pratt, whose rank of major general was made temporary in April, retired from the army, after a thirty-five year career, in 1946.

== Bibliography ==
- Smart, Nick (2005). Biographical Dictionary of British Generals of the Second World War. Barnsley, South Yorkshire: Pen and Sword Books. ISBN 1844150496.
- Moore, Darren (2001). Duntroon: The Royal Military College of Australia 1911–2001. Canberra: Royal Military College of Australia. ISBN 978-1-876439-97-2.
- Buckton, Henry. Retreat: Dunkirk and the Evacuation of Western Europe. Amberley Publishing Limited, 2017. ISBN 1445664836

Military offices
Preceded by Julius Bruche	Commandant of the Royal Military College, Duntroon; 1931	Succeeded by Francis Bede Heritage
