= John William Parnell =

Australian soldier and administrator

- Born: 6 March 1860; Melbourne, Victoria
- Died: 8 July 1931 (aged 71); Hawthorn, Victoria
- Burial place: Melbourne General Cemetery
- Military career
- Allegiance: Australia
- Branch: Victorian Military Forces; Australian Army
- Service years: 1884–1920
- Rank: Lieutenant General
- Commands: Royal Military College, Duntroon (1914–20); 6th Military District (1909–11)
- Awards: Companion of the Order of St Michael and St George; Officer of the Order of the British Empire
- Other work: Administrator of Norfolk Island (1920–24)

Lieutenant General John William Parnell, CMG, OBE (6 March 1860 – 8 July 1931) was an Australian soldier who served during the First World War and Administrator of Norfolk Island.

Parnell was only son of Edwin Parnell, teacher, and his wife Olivia, née Higginbotham. He attended All Saints Grammar School and later Wesley College.

Parnell was appointed commandant of the Royal Military College, Duntroon, just prior to the First World War in 1914. He remained as the commandant during the course of the war finishing his posting in 1920.

He was the administrator of Norfolk Island from 1 September 1920 until resigning the position, due to ill health, in April 1924. He died on 8 July 1931, his wife Ida and his youngest daughter Mary surviving him. Three children predeceased him.

Military offices
Preceded by William Bridges	Commandant of the Royal Military College, Duntroon; 1914–1920	Succeeded by James Gordon Legge
