= Daniel Luxton =

- Born: 22 June 1891; Camberwell, Victoria
- Died: 1960; Heidelberg, Victoria
- Military career
- Allegiance: Australia
- Branch: Australian Army
- Service years: 1911–1943
- Rank: Brigadier
- Commands: 2nd Infantry Brigade (1923–25, 1927–33); 5th Battalion, 22nd Infantry Regiment (1919–21); 5th Battalion (1917–19)
- Conflicts: First World War; Second World War
- Awards: Companion of the Order of St Michael and St George; Distinguished Service Order; Colonial Auxiliary Forces Officers' Decoration; Mentioned in Despatches (3)

Brigadier Daniel Aston Luxton, CMG, DSO, VD (22 June 1891 – 1960) was an Australian Army officer in the First and Second World Wars.

== Military career ==
Luxton served in the Australian Imperial Force in the 5th Battalion. Luxton embarked from Melbourne as a lieutenant on 21 October 1914. After being repeatedly promoted over the course of the war, Luxton was appointed the commanding officer of the 5th Battalion on 8 March 1917. During his wartime service, Luxton was appointed a Companion of the Order of St Michael and St George, and awarded the Distinguished Service Order.

During the Second World War, Luxton served as a brigadier in the Second Australian Imperial Force.
