= James Gordon Legge =

Australian general

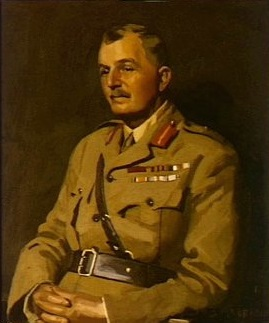
- Official portrait of Major General James Gordon Legge, 1920
- Born: 15 August 1863; Hackney, London, England
- Died: 18 September 1947 (aged 84); Oakleigh, Victoria, Australia
- Relatives: Major General Stanley Legge (son)
- Military career
- Allegiance: Australia
- Branch: Australian Army
- Service years: 1885–1924
- Rank: Lieutenant General
- Commands: Chief of the General Staff (1914–15, 1917–20); 2nd Division (1915–17); Australian Imperial Force (1915); 1st Division (1915)
- Conflicts: Second Boer War; First World War
- Awards: Companion of the Order of the Bath; Companion of the Order of St Michael and St George; Mentioned in Despatches; Grand Officer of the Order of Prince Danilo I (Montenegro); Officer of the Legion of Honour (France)
- Other work: Farmer

Lieutenant General James Gordon Legge, CB, CMG (15 August 1863 – 18 September 1947) was an Australian Army senior officer who served in the First World War and was the Chief of the General Staff, Australia's highest ranking army officer between 1914 and 1915 and again from 1917 to 1920. His son, Stanley Ferguson Legge, reached the rank of major general.

== Early life ==
James Gordon Legge was born in Hackney, London, England, on 15 August 1863, the eldest of eight sons. The family migrated to Australia in 1878. He was educated at Cranleigh School in Surrey, England, and Sydney Grammar School. Legge graduated from the University of Sydney with a Bachelor of Arts in 1884, Master of Arts in 1887 and a Bachelor of Law in 1890.

Legge taught at Sydney Boys High School from 1886 to 1890 when he stood down to practice law, being admitted to the bar in New South Wales on 6 March 1891. One fruit of his legal career was Supreme Court Cases in New South Wales from 1825 to 1862, soon to be known as "Legge's Reports", and "constantly quoted in legal arguments".

== Early military career ==
Legge was commissioned as a lieutenant into the 3rd New South Wales Infantry Regiment in 1885 but resigned the next year. In October 1887 he was commissioned as a second lieutenant into the 1st New South Wales Regiment. He was promoted to lieutenant in 1892. In 1894 he was commissioned as a captain in the New South Wales permanent force. He immediately departed for a tour of duty with the British Army in India, serving a month with the 5th Dragoon Guards and three months with the Queen's Own Royal West Kent Regiment. In 1899 Legge delivered to the United Services Institution a proposal for a 90 000 strong "Australian Defence Force", based on compulsory military training of men aged between 20 and 25.

With the outbreak of the Second Boer War in October 1899, Legge was appointed to command an infantry company, with Lieutenant William Holmes as one of his subalterns, and promoted to captain in December. The company left for South Africa in November 1899, and on arrival was incorporated in the Australian Regiment. Originally an infantry unit, this became mounted in February. Legge pushed for a separate identity for the New South Wales contingent, he succeeded and on 7 April 1900, the Australian Regiment was disbanded, and colonial regiments formed into a new mounted division under Lieutenant General Sir Ian Hamilton. Legge's company was incorporated into the 1st New South Wales Mounted Rifles. He saw action at Diamond Hill, Elands River, Vet River and Zand River. In December 1900, his company had completed its twelve-month tour and returned to Australia. Legge remained, serving as an intelligence officer.

On his return to Australia, Legge was granted the rank of brevet major, in 1903 was made secretary to the committee drafting the Defence Act, and in 1904 was made an honorary aide-de-camp of the governor general. In the same year he published a handbook on military law. Then on 1 September 1904, he was promoted to major and given the post of Deputy Assistant Adjutant General at Second Military District Headquarters in Sydney.

With the advent of the second Deakin government, Legge began to work directly under the Minister for Defence Thomas Ewing as chief planner for a complete refoundation of the Commonwealth's land forces on the basis of compulsory military training. "He was now the favourite man-at-arms of Deakin and the Minister of Defence".

In 1907, he began working with Colonel William Bridges at Army Headquarters in Melbourne. With the rank of temporary lieutenant colonel, Legge was appointed Quartermaster General and a member of the Military Board in January 1909. He was promoted to the substantive rank of lieutenant colonel on 17 December 1909, the military Board failure to endorse his promotion.

When Field Marshal Lord Kitchener visited Australia in December 1909, Legge worked very closely with him. The Defence Scheme that became known as Kitchener's Defence Scheme had largely developed by Legge. From March 1910 to June 1911, Legge served as Director of Operations as well as Quartermaster General.

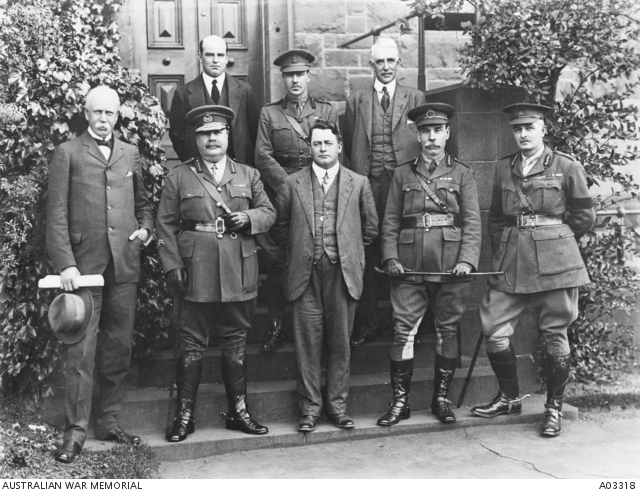
Members of the Australian Army's Military Board, 1914. Colonel Legge stands on the extreme right.

In January 1912, Legge was designated Australian Representative on the Imperial General Staff in London. Legge sent information back to Australia regarding Japanese military capabilities. He observed the British Army, and was particularly impressed with the Royal Flying Corps, and helped speed up the arrangements for the establishment of an Australian Flying Corps. In June he was made a CMG. In July he was attached to the general staff and was granted the local rank of lieutenant colonel while employed in this role.

== First World War ==
On 1 May 1914, Legge was appointed Chief of the General Staff, with the rank of full colonel, but he did not sail for home until July 1914. By the time Legge reached Adelaide, war had broken out. With Bridges occupied in organising the Australian Imperial Force (AIF), Legge took over the organisation of the Australian Naval and Military Expeditionary Force for service in New Guinea. When Bridges departed for overseas, Legge took over responsibility for the training of AIF reinforcements.

When Bridges was fatally wounded by a Turkish sniper in Monash Valley in May 1915, Legge was the natural choice of the Australian government to succeed him as both commander of the 1st Division and of the AIF. The Australian field commanders, Colonels Harry Chauvel, James Whiteside McCay and John Monash, were disappointed at being passed over by an officer who was their junior, with no recent combat experience, and protested to Generals William Birdwood and Hamilton. Prime Minister Andrew Fisher stood firm on Legge's appointment, attributing Legge's unpopularity to his rise over the heads of other officers through ability, and duly promoted Legge to major general on 22 June 1915.

Legge reached Mudros on 24 June 1915, and began working on winning the respect of his new subordinates. He arranged for the colonels to be promoted to brigadier general in line with their British counterparts, with seniority back dated to their assumption of brigade command. Legge also fought suggestions by the British to place Australian officers junior to British officers of the same rank. At Birdwood's suggestion, Legge inspected the Australian Base in Egypt and cabled recommendations back to the Australian government in Melbourne. This upset Birdwood, who felt that such communications should go through him.

Legge clashed with Birdwood over the plan for the August Offensive at Anzac Cove. Like his predecessor, Legge felt that the proposed assault on Lone Pine would be costly and most likely futile unless the high ground above it was first seized. Birdwood held that only an attack on a key position like Lone Pine would cause the Turks to divert troops from opposing the main effort. Events would prove both men correct.

Birdwood seized on an opportunity to remove Legge from the scene when Brigadier General McCay, about to take command of the 2nd Division, which had begun forming in Egypt, broke his leg and was evacuated on 11 July 1915. Birdwood sent Legge to Egypt to take over the 2nd Division instead. On appointment to this post, Legge's command of the AIF lapsed.

Legge had no illusions about how difficult getting the 2nd Division ready for action as soon as possible would be, for he knew that many crucial elements of the division were either non-existent or still in Australia. Finding experienced officers for his headquarters staff was no less difficult. Legge's work was still incomplete when Hamilton called the division forward in August for piecemeal commitment at Gallipoli. Legge travelled back to Gallipoli with the 6th Brigade. On 2 September 1915, some 60 km south of Lemnos, the transport HMT Southland was torpedoed by a German submarine. Legge won the admiration of many for the quiet and good humoured way he handled the situation, remaining on board with the last 400 men, who were eventually transferred to the hospital ship Neuralia. About 32 Australians died in the incident.

The 2nd Division relieved the 1st in the line, enabling the veterans to be rested on Lemnos. From mid-October, Legge occasionally acted as corps commander whenever Major General Alexander Godley was absent. He became the first Australian to have temporary command of a corps. Legge embarked on a number of schemes to improve the defences at Anzac Cove, which some thought impractical and others thought showed signs of sheer genius. On 23 November 1915, Legge was evacuated to Egypt sick.

In January 1916 Legge resumed command of the 2nd Division in Egypt. On 13 March 1916, the 2nd Division began to entrain for Alexandria on its long journey to the Western Front. On the night of 7 April 1916, the 2nd Division entered the line for the first time, in an area known as "nursery" sector near Armentières. A quiet section of the line, this sector was used by both sides to acclimatise new units to conditions on the Western Front. The division soon became caught up in raids, and casualties were high because of Birdwood's insistence on manning the front line more densely than recommended.

Moving into the line at Pozières on 27 July 1916, the commander of the British Reserve Army, General Sir Hubert Gough, ordered Legge to take the Pozières Heights at once. The attack, delivered on 28–29 July, was a complete failure due to poor preparation, and cost the division some 3,500 casualties. Legge took the majority of the blame for the failure.

In the next few days, Legge strove to get another attack ready, all the while under tremendous pressure from the enemy, who shelled the 2nd Division's positions nonstop, compelling postponement first to the 2nd and then to 4 August. Gough and General Sir Douglas Haig were both displeased with the postponements, which they blamed on Legge. When the attack was finally delivered, it was a complete success, and the Pozières Heights were under Australian control. Its twelve-day tour at Pozières cost the 2nd Division 6,848 men, almost a third of its strength.

On 28 January 1917, Legge fell ill again with the flu and Birdwood took the opportunity to relieve him of his command. When he recovered, he returned to Australia where he was appointed Inspector General on 30 April 1917. On 1 August 1917, he became Chief of the General Staff again, reverting to his permanent rank of colonel, but retaining the rank of major general as an honorary rank. As Chief of the General Staff, Legge's role was dealing with politicians in Australia, and providing reinforcements for the AIF overseas.

== Post war ==
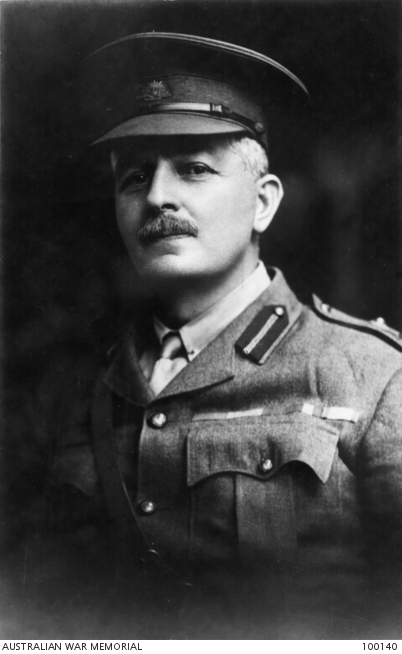
Legge as commandant of the RMC, Duntroon in the 1920s.

In 1918, Legge began considering the problem of how to defend Australia against the Japanese if the Allies lost the war. In considering the makeup of the postwar forces, Legge became a strong advocate of an independent Royal Australian Air Force and a major role for air power, and he was appointed to a committee to look into the matter in January 1919. In January 1920, Legge was appointed to a committee chaired by Harry Chauvel to examine the future structure of the army.

On 2 January 1920, Legge was substantially promoted to major general. On 1 June 1920 he became Commandant of the Royal Military College, Duntroon. In the defence cuts of 1922, Legge, along with most of his staff, was retrenched. He was placed on the unattached list on 1 August 1922, and on the retired list on 14 January 1924, with the honorary rank of lieutenant general. In February 1924 he was awarded the Légion d'honneur.

=== Cranleigh ===
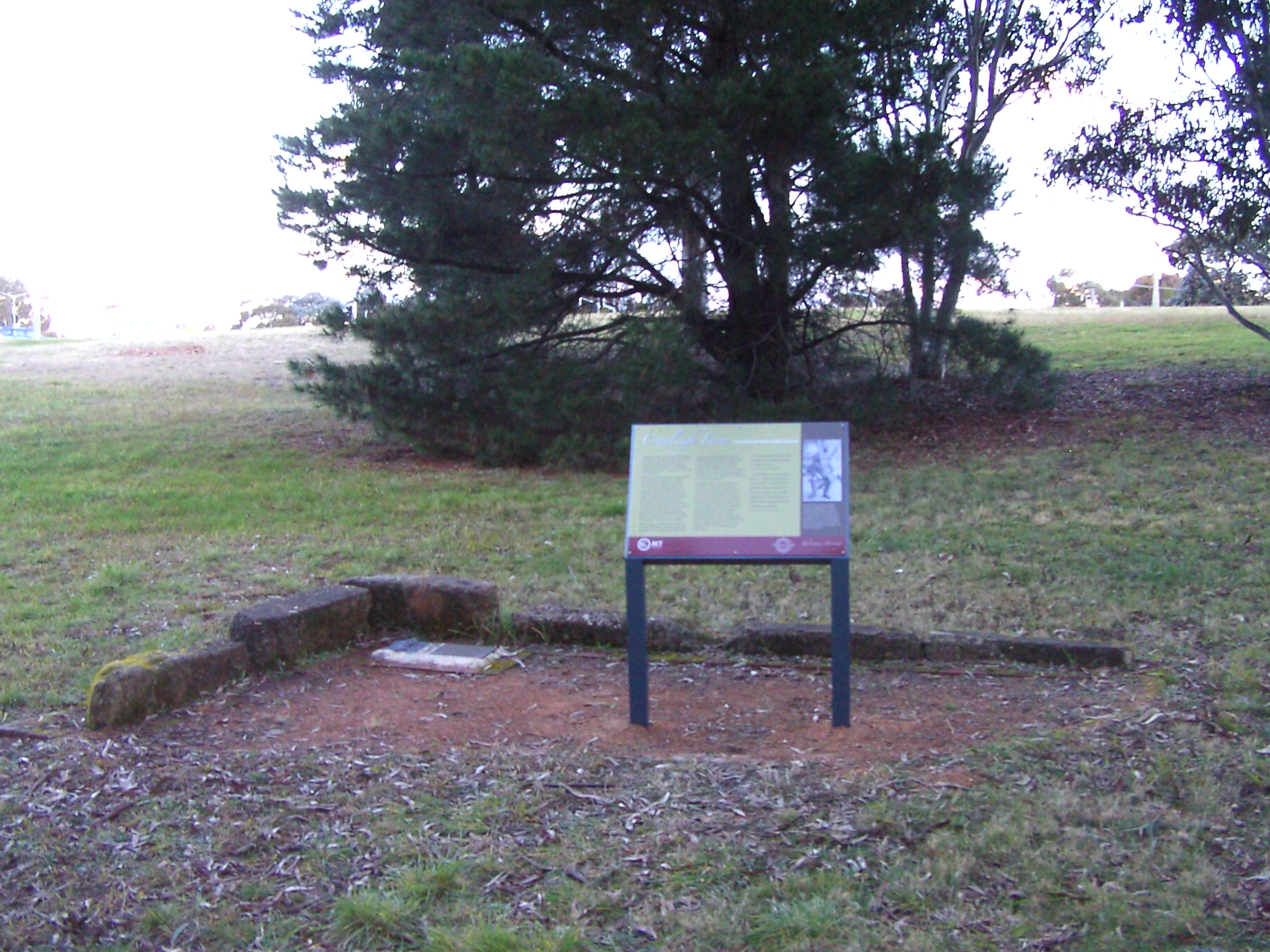
Remnants of Cranleigh House, 2012

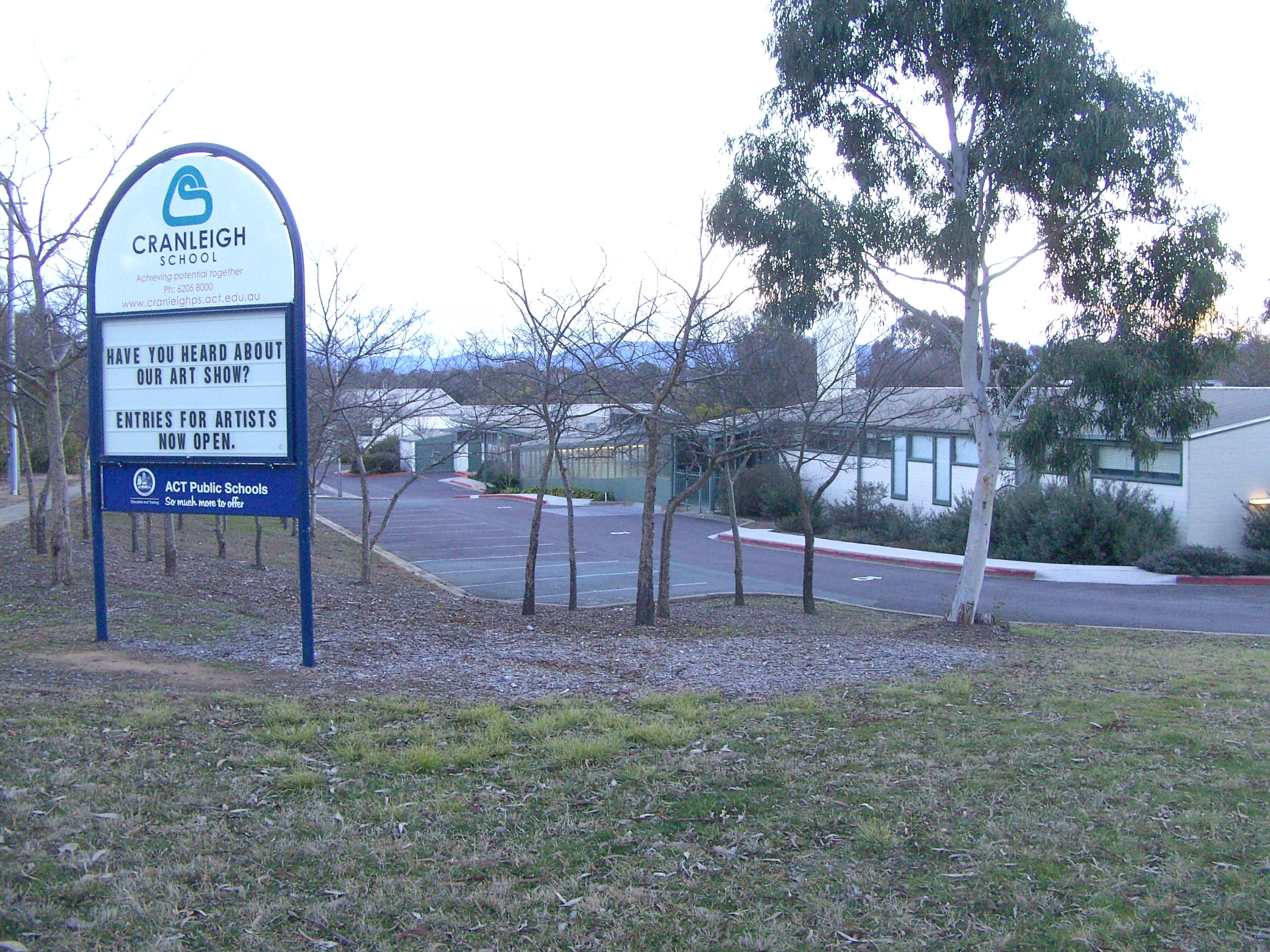
Cranleigh School

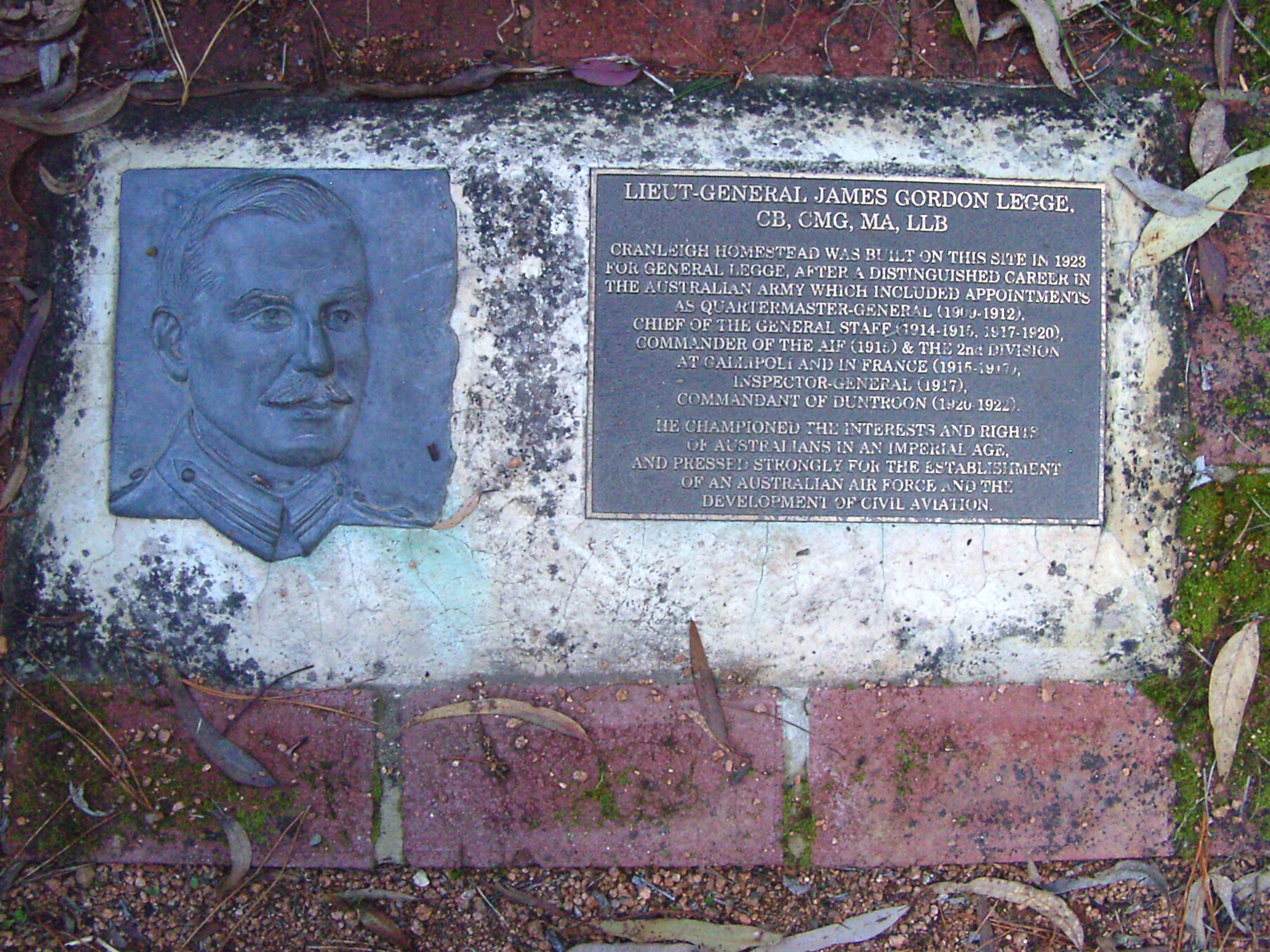
Relief in bronze and plaque, at Cranleigh site

Due to his early retirement, Legge was denied a pension, but he was able to obtain money from the Soldier Settlement Scheme to buy a lease on a 400 acres (160 ha) farm north of the Weetangera farm in the Australian Capital Territory. He called it "Cranleigh" after his school in England and his former home in Sydney, and he raised pigs and horses, and grew potatoes. Many of the local farmers thought him eccentric, as the area is best known as sheep country. The farm failed for various reasons, including that a proposed Canberra–Yass railway line passing the farm was not built; and, there was a drought from 1937–39.

By 1923 cottages for a manager and workmen were being built at Cranleigh, farm machinery including a tractor had been purchased and a concrete weir across the Ginninderra Creek was under construction. The main house was styled from houses he had seen in India early in his military career. In its external appearance the house was square with a flat roof resembling a fort or block house, built of concrete blocks moulded on site with sand from Ginninderra Creek. There was a central verandah courtyard surrounded by ten rooms with each room having an entrance to the courtyard.

=== Death ===
Legge died at Oakleigh, Victoria on 18 September 1947 and was buried at nearby Cheltenham Cemetery. In accordance with his wishes, no monument or headstone marks his grave. His wife had died a little more than two weeks earlier in Sydney, where she was being cared for by family. She had left the farm about three years earlier due to ill health.

== Legacy ==
In 2011, the site of Legge's house and "Cranleigh Farm" (35°13′35.7″S 149°2′3.5″E), of which neither have left appreciable signs, in Latham, ACT at the corner of Kingsford Smith Drive and Southern Cross Drive, was considered for listing under the Heritage Act 2004 by the ACT Heritage Council, and rejected on all grounds. The decision contains a detailed account of the life of Legge and his reasons for remaining in the Australian Capital Territory in his retirement. The location of the farm remains an open space within Latham. The farm is commemorated by the Cranleigh School, that provides educational programs for children in the age range 3–12 with intellectual impairments, sited about 200m west of the farm site in Starke Street, Holt.

Military offices
Preceded by Major General Joseph Maria Gordon	Chief of the General Staff; 1914–1915	Succeeded by Colonel Godfrey Irving
Preceded by Colonel Hubert John Foster	Chief of the General Staff; 1917–1920	Succeeded by Major General Sir Brudenell White
Preceded by John William Parnell	Commandant of the Royal Military College, Duntroon; 1920–1922	Succeeded by Francis Bede Heritage
