= Wilford Whittle =

Australian brigadier

Wilford William Whittle
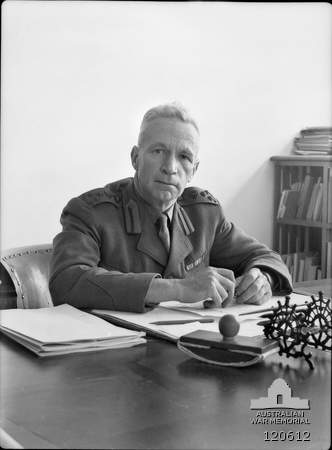
- Brigadier Whittle at Victoria Barracks, December 1945.
- Born: 30 August 1892; Youanmite, Victoria
- Died: 17 June 1964 (aged 71); Melbourne, Victoria
- Military career
- Allegiance: Australia
- Branch: Australian Army
- Service years: 1912–1948
- Rank: Major General
- Commands: Master-General of Ordnance (1945–48); Director of Ordnance Services (1940); 3rd Heavy Artillery Brigade (1939–40); 2nd Heavy Artillery Brigade (1939); 9th Heavy Artillery Battery (1936–39)
- Conflicts: First World War; Second World War
- Awards: Mentioned in Despatches

Major General Wilford William Whittle (30 August 1892 – 17 June 1964) was a senior officer of the Australian Army who served in both the First and Second World Wars.

== Early life and career ==
Whittle was born on 30 August 1892 in Youanmite, Victoria, and was commissioned into the Siege Artillery Brigade, 36th Heavy Artillery Brigade, on 21 May 1915.

Lieutenant Whittle embarked at Melbourne in July 1915, was wounded in action in December 1916, promoted to captain in November 1917 and was Mentioned in Despatches.

In February 1919, Whittle attended Ordnance Courses at the Ordnance College Woolwich, London, and was subsequently promoted to major.

By 1936 Whittle had been promoted to lieutenant colonel and commanded the Northern Territory garrison from 13 April 1936 to 12 March 1939. This was during a period of increasing world tension in the lead up to World War II and there were limited forces available there with only 4 officers and 84 other ranks present there. In 1937 the Northern Standard stated their belief that the town was a "death trap for the garrison which could not fight a bigger force than a cruiser's landing party". Whittle left the posting in March 1939 and was replaced by AB MacDonald who oversaw a build up of personnel and resources at the site.

Whittle Street in Larrakeyah Barracks, Darwin, commemorates this command.

== Second World War ==
A commander of various brigades of the Royal Australian Artillery during the early months of the Second World War, Whittle became Deputy Master-General of Ordnance in November 1940, and later Master-General of Ordnance, a post he held until his retirement in 1948. On retirement Whittle was granted the honorary rank of major general from 31 December 1948.

He died in Melbourne on 17 June 1964.
