= Bob Slater =

Australian rules footballer

Personal information
- Full name: Adam Robert Slater
- Born: 13 March 1934
- Died: 24 August 1994 (aged 60); Geelong, Victoria
- Original team: Maidstone
- Height: 178 cm (5 ft 10 in)
- Weight: 83 kg (183 lb)

Playing career^{1}
Years	Club	Games (Goals)
1952–53	Footscray	6 (3)
- ^{1} Playing statistics correct to the end of 1953.

Adam Robert Slater (13 March 1934 – 24 August 1994) was an Australian rules footballer who played with Footscray in the Victorian Football League (VFL).
