= Royal Military College, Duntroon =

Australian Army training establishment

- Land Combat College
- Motto: Latin: Doctrina vim promovet (Note: According to Coulthard-Clark 1986, p. 41, the College's motto was taken from Horace, Book 4, Ode 4 and was suggested by Professor T.G. Tucker of Melbourne University.) lit: Learning promotes strength
- Type: Military college
- Established: 27 June 1911; 115 years ago
- Affiliations: Duntroon Society
- Commanding officer: Lieutenant Colonel Brian Hickey
- Students: 425 (85 cadets in 5 companies)
- Location: Campbell, Canberra, Australian Capital Territory, Australia; 35°17′59″S 149°09′54″E
- Campus: 150 hectares (370 acres) suburban
- Colours: Regimental Colours: The badge of the Corps of Staff Cadets on a blue ensign.; King's Colours: Australian National Flag defaced with a royal badge
- Nickname: Cordie
- Mascot: 'Enobesra'
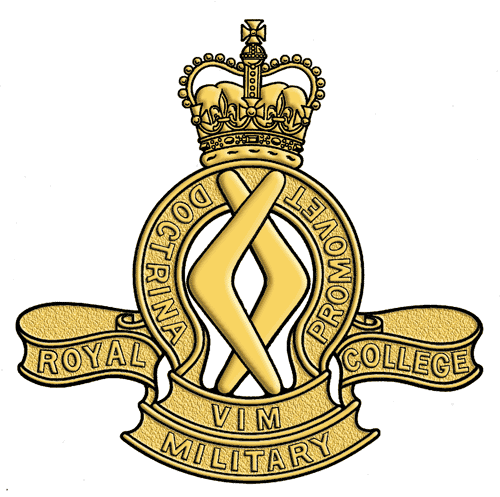

The Royal Military College, Duntroon, also known simply as Duntroon, is the Australian Army's officer training establishment. It was founded at Duntroon in Canberra, Australian Capital Territory, in 1911, and is situated at the foot of Mount Pleasant near Lake Burley Griffin, close to the Department of Defence headquarters at Russell Hill. Duntroon is adjacent to the Australian Defence Force Academy (ADFA), which is the tri-service military academy of the Australian Defence Force, and provides both military and tertiary academic education for junior officers of the Australian Army, Royal Australian Air Force and Royal Australian Navy.

== History ==
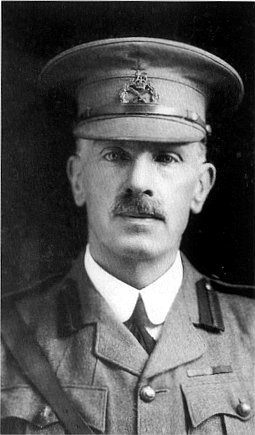
Major General William Bridges

The Royal Military College, Duntroon, was opened on 27 June 1911 by the Governor-General, Lord Dudley. Situated on the Campbell family homestead in Canberra, which had been named "Duntroon" in 1833 after Duntrune Castle – their ancestral home on Loch Crinan in Argyll, Scotland. The college was one of the first Commonwealth facilities established in the newly created capital. The Australian Government first rented the Duntroon homestead for two years (November 1910 – July 1912) and acquired freehold to the estate and 150 hectares (370 acres) after the creation of the federal capital.

The first Commandant of the college was Brigadier General William Bridges, who later died on a hospital ship after being wounded by a sniper on the shores of Gallipoli. Under his recommendations the college was modelled on aspects from the Royal Military College of Canada and the military colleges of Britain and the United States of America. Several British officers, including Lieutenant Colonel Charles Gwynn as Director of Military Art, were assigned as staff members of the college. During Bridges' frequent absences, Gwynn served as acting Commandant.

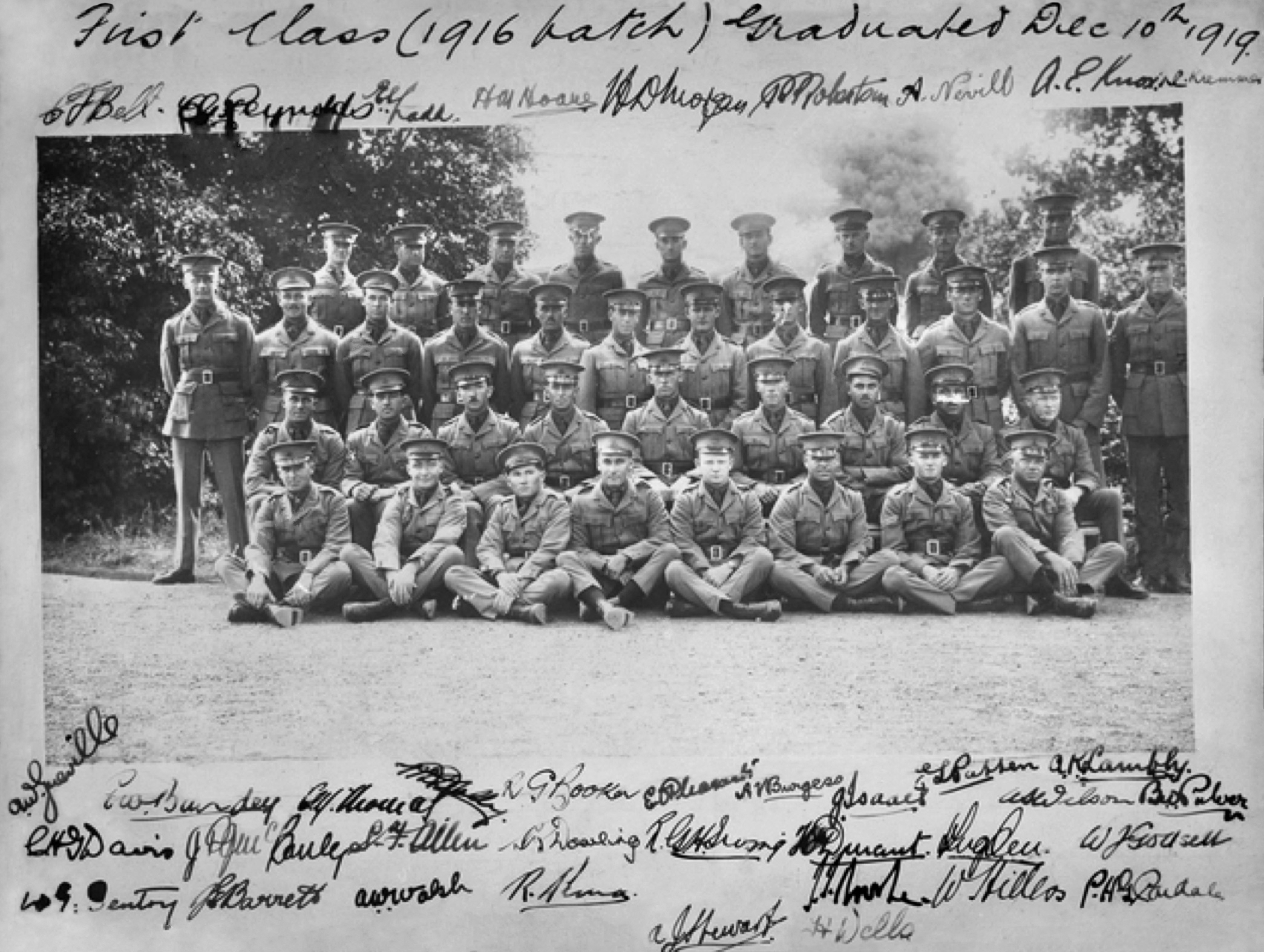
Members of the first officer cadet intake, which had arrived in 1916, on graduation in December 1919

When the First World War broke out in August 1914, there had not been enough time for the first class to complete the full Duntroon course. Nevertheless, it was decided to graduate the class early so that they could be sent to Gallipoli, where General Sir Ian Hamilton, commander of the Mediterranean Expeditionary Force, said that "... each Duntroon-educated officer was ... worth his weight in gold". During the war, 158 Duntroon graduates had been sent overseas on active service, of whom 42 were killed or died of wounds and another 58 were wounded. In 1927 the King's Colour was presented to the Corps of Staff Cadets by His Royal Highness, The Duke of York.

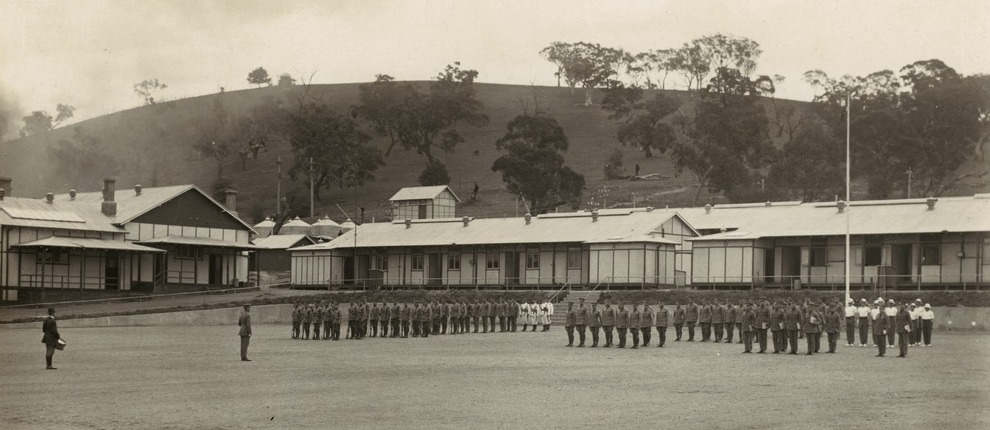
Officer cadets on parade at RMC Duntroon, circa 1920

In the beginning, the college offered a four-year course, during which the first two years focused upon civil subjects and the last two years focused upon military subjects. Over the entire course, however, there was military specific training, including physical training, drill, signalling and weapon handling. Over the years, however, with the impact of the two World Wars, the duration and focus of the course changed as the requirements of the Army dictated. The college was forced to relocate to the Victoria Barracks, Sydney between 1931 and 1936 due to the economic downturn caused by the Great Depression. The commandant at the time, Brigadier-General E.F. Harrison considered the move of the college, a severe blow to the 'Duntroon spirit', suggested to the Minister for Home Affairs, Arthur Blakely, that the name "Duntroon" move with the college to Sydney, and the local area in Canberra be changed to "Campbell". The proposal for the name moving to Sydney was, supported by Percy Deane, the head of the Department of Home Affairs (1929–32) in an official memorandum stating that the heritage of Duntroon had become so great that "As a matter of fact, "Duntroon" is as well known in military circles as "Sandhurst"; however, he later stated it was proposed that the area in Canberra retain the name Duntroon. In a letter to Blakeley, Albert Ernest Green the Minister for Defence stated that in relation to the College in Sydney being called Duntroon, the Military Board has, "recommended in view of the tradition established by the Royal Military College and its association with the name 'Duntroon' that the name be retained for use on transfer of the Royal Military College to Paddington". The area would remain to be called Duntroon until 1956, when the suburb of Campbell was created named after Robert Campbell of the Campbell family, where ADFA and RMC-D reside.

During the Second World War short courses of between six months and a year were run, and ultimately 696 graduates of the College undertook active service overseas in either the Australian, British or New Zealand armed forces, while a further 122 former cadets who had not graduated served in varying capacities. Of these 122, three went on to have quite distinguished careers, with one rising to the rank of brigadier in the Australian Army, another to brigadier in the New Zealand Army and a third, R.C. McCay, reaching the rank of lieutenant general and serving in the British Indian Army and then becoming chief-of-staff of the newly formed Pakistan Army.

Following the war, the length of the course was set at four years again and efforts were made to increase the level of academic rigour in the college's programs. This culminated in 1967 when the college affiliated with the University of New South Wales (UNSW) to offer bachelor's courses in Arts, Science or Engineering, commencing in the 1968 academic year. Under this program, the first degrees from RMC were awarded in 1971. To graduate, cadets had to achieve passes in both military and academic studies and leadership. The link with UNSW was almost severed in 1969 when Duntroon was the centre of an inquiry after Gerry Walsh, a member of the academic staff, revealed details of bastardisation passed on to him by a student at the college. The inquiry resulted in at least one army career ending, while other personnel were severely punished. A further bastardisation scandal was exposed in 1983.

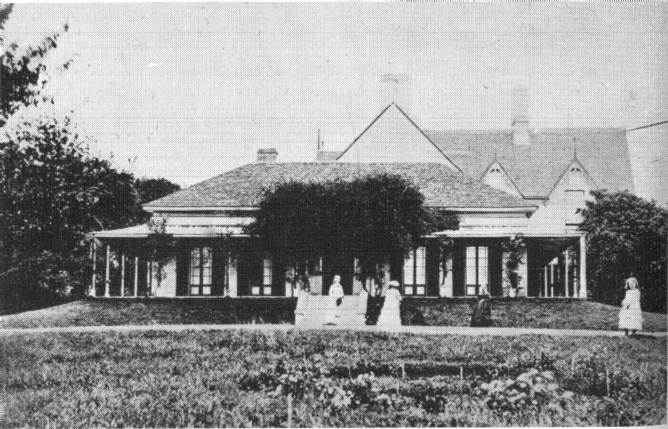
Duntroon Homestead

With the closure of the Officer Cadet School, Portsea in December 1985, and the closure of the Women's Officer Training Wing at Georges Heights, Sydney, in December 1984, the Royal Military College, Duntroon became the sole General Service Officer training institute in the Australian Army, as all Regular Army officers serving in combat, combat support or service support Corps were required to attend Duntroon to be commissioned. Shortly after this, the role of the college changed again with the establishment of the Australian Defence Force Academy in 1986. As a result of this change, Duntroon ceased to offer university degrees as ADFA became responsible for the academic training of Army cadets, as well as those from the Air Force and Navy. The same year, the college celebrated its 75th anniversary (1911–1986). As an acknowledgement of this, 33-cent stamps featuring the head of a male officer cadet were printed; the first day of issue was 27 June 1986.

RMC's purview was expanded in 1995 as it "became responsible for the initial military training of all full-time, part-time and specialist service officers in the Australian Army". This resulted in the centralisation of all officer training courses under the college's auspices; this included short courses for specialist service officers such as doctors, nurses, lawyers and chaplains, under the auspices of Romani Company, as well as the delivery of the final module of the Reserve officer training continuum. For a brief period, under the Ready Reserve Scheme, Reserve officers attended the college for a cut-down six-month version of the full-time course. For full-time General Service Officer cadets though, the program remained essentially unchanged from that which had been established after the formation of ADFA, when the course had been reduced to 18 months, and broken up into three distinct classes—III (third), II (second) and I (first) Class. Under this program, which has been maintained since 1986, cadets who wish to pursue a degree attend ADFA for three years upon appointment, before going to Duntroon for 12 months, and starting the course in II Class. This is referred to as "going over the hill", as cadets are marched in formation over a spur of Mt. Pleasant that divides the ADFA and RMC campuses. For those cadets who pursue a four-year bachelors degree (such as Engineering or Hons), they come back to ADFA for their final year as a Lieutenant, graduating with their degree after five years after starting.

Anonymous reviews of officer training in 2007 brought to light racism and harassment of female recruits. In 2011, Andrew Wilkie admitted to being both a victim and perpetrator of bullying while at Duntroon.

In 2011, the college celebrated its centenary (1911–2011); as part of the celebrations, Queen Elizabeth II presented the college with new colours. A series of twenty-eight-gram (one-ounce) silver dollar coins were also minted.

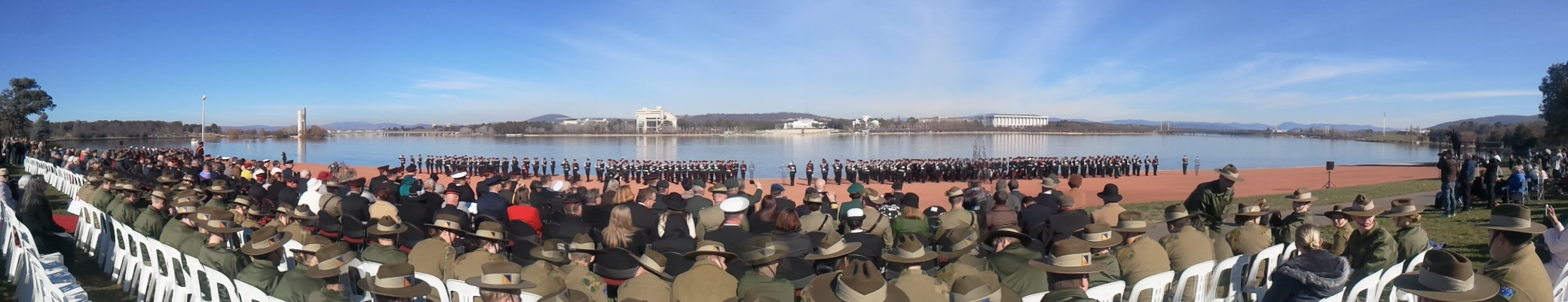
Trooping the Colour ceremony, 6 June 2015, at Rhonde Terrace, Anzac Parade, beside Lake Burley Griffin. Reviewing Officer: General Sir Peter Cosgrove, Governor-General of Australia. Also present: Chief of the Defence Force; Chief of Army; Chief of Navy; Commandant, RMC

== Present day ==
=== Organisation ===
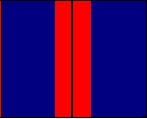
Corps of Staff Cadets Unit Colour Patch

The majority of the cadets at Duntroon are members of the Australian Army, although the college also trains some Royal Australian Air Force personnel who are training to become Ground Defence Officers. By tradition a small number of officer cadets from New Zealand also attend the college, while since 1967 there has been a steady number of foreign cadets attending the college from nations in Southeast Asia and the Middle East. While at the college, officer cadets are referred to by the honorary title of 'staff cadet', which is used as a substitute for the cadet's rank which is technically 'Officer Cadet'. This title came about due to the fact that originally graduates entered the Staff Officer Corps of the Australian Army. After the late 1940s, however, graduates were assigned different corps upon graduation and were no longer posted to the Staff Corps. The title was kept on as a tradition at Duntroon, however, although officer trainees at all other Australian Army officer training establishments are referred to as 'officer cadets'. (Note: Other officer training establishments that have existed concurrently to RMC-D are the OCS Portsea, OCTU Scheyville and the Women's Officer Training Wing at George's Heights.)

Administratively, the cadets are organised into a nominal infantry battalion structure, which is known internally as the 11th Infantry Battalion, (Note: Although this unit is not part of the official Australian Army order of battle and is distinct from the 11th Battalion, which has its own lineage.) with companies, platoons and sections which form the Corps of Staff Cadets. Within each of these formations there are cadets from all three classes (levels of training), who are organised into an internal hierarchy that gives the cadets themselves responsibility for looking after their own administration while the Corps is in barracks, albeit with guidance and supervision from training staff. Field training, however, is delivered by the non-commissioned officers and commissioned officers of the training staff and during this phase the cadets are separated into their distinct class groups.

Since its inception, the size of the Corps of Staff Cadets has fluctuated. Initially the Corps was organised into a single company, however, in 1922 the decline in the number of cadets being admitted meant that in reality only two platoons existed. Nevertheless, since then the Corps has largely increased. In 1947, when the four-year course was re-established following its suspension during the Second World War, the Corps was organised into two companies that were designated alphabetically 'A' and 'B'. In 1950, however, as the size of the Corps rose to 190 cadets, a third company, designated 'C' Company was established. These companies were re-organised the following year, however, as the Corps was expanded to 210 cadets and a fourth company raised. At this time the alphabetical designations were replaced with geographical names that were chosen based upon places where Australians had fought: Gallipoli, Bardia, Alamein and Kokoda.

By 1954 the number of cadets had risen further to 260, necessitating the raising of a fifth company and at this stage it was decided to name the companies after famous Australian battles, these names being: Alamein, Gallipoli, Kokoda, Kapyong and Romani. Following this expansion, however, the size of the Corps dropped and in 1958 the number of cadets had fallen to 200 and as a result Romani Company was disbanded. In 1974 a fifth company was raised—Long Tan—while in 1976, a sixth company was raised and Romani Company was re-established. In 1986, as a result of the changing role of Duntroon, the Corps was reduced to four companies again, with Kokoda and Romani Companies being disbanded. Kokoda was reformed in 1987 as the size of the Corps reached 370 cadets, while Long Tan was disbanded in 1991 and reformed in 1995.

There are currently five full-time companies making up the Corps, these are: Long Tan, Alamein, Gallipoli, Kapyong and Kokoda. The sixth company, Romani, is used for Reserve officers who come to the College in January and July to complete the final module of their training. There is also a rehabilitation and administration company known as Bridges Company, established in October 1989. Over the course of the training semester the five full-time companies compete through sporting events and academic studies for the honour of carrying the Sovereign's Banner on parade, with the first placed company taking the title of 'Sovereign's Company' for the next semester and taking their place on the right flank when the Corps is on parade.

=== Programs ===
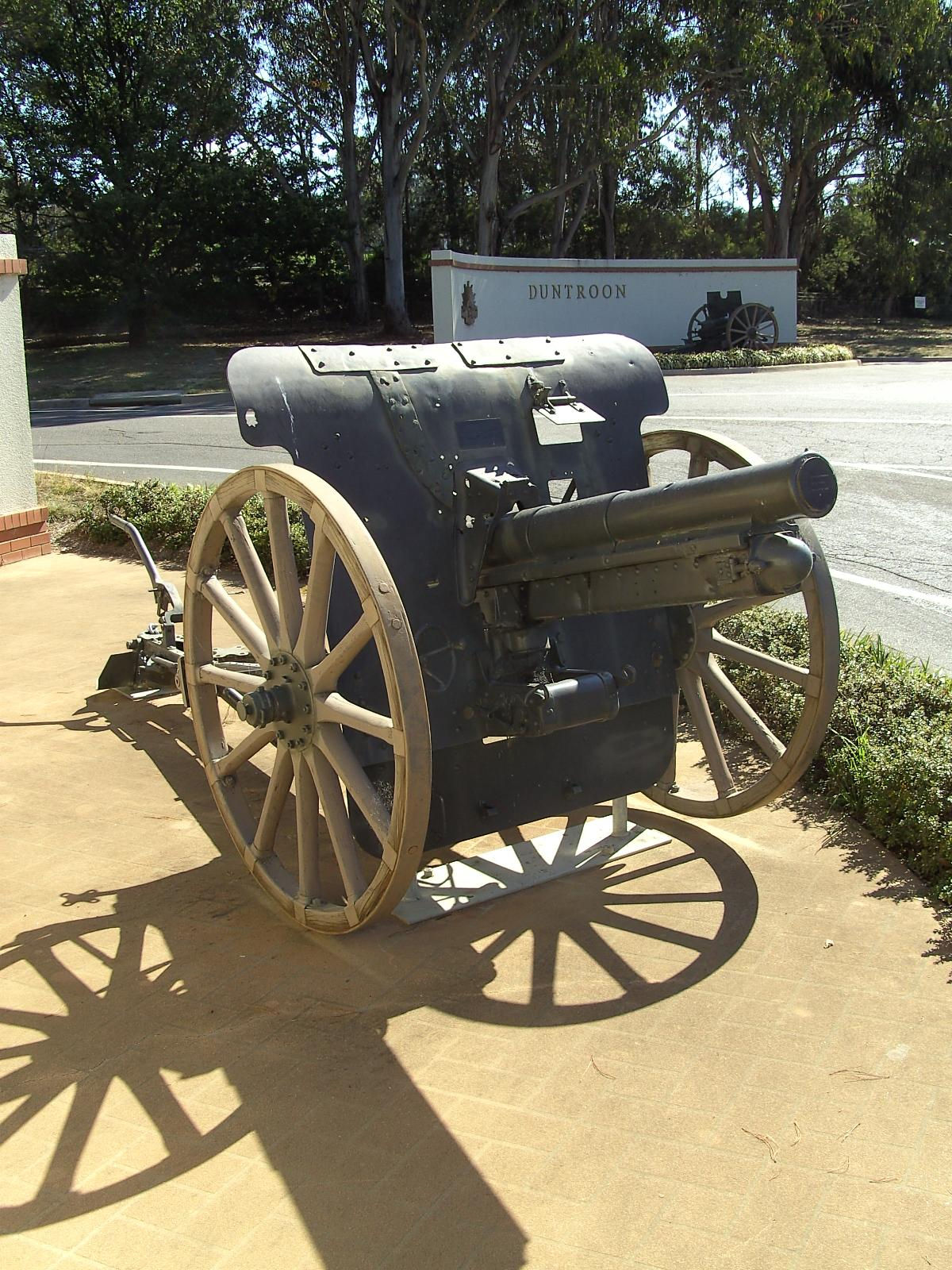
"The Gun Gate Entrance", north side of RMC Duntroon onto Fairbairn Avenue. The current gates were commissioned by then Brigadier (later General) Peter Cosgrove, Commandant 1997.

The charter of the Royal Military College, Duntroon is "to produce officers capable of commanding platoon-sized elements in the Hardened and Networked Army concept, and to prepare specialist candidates for commissioning. The College prepares cadets and other selected candidates for careers in the Army by promoting leadership and integrity; by promoting high ideals and the pursuit of excellence, and by inculcating a sense of duty, loyalty and service to the nation". The current full-time program is a course of 18 months in duration, broken into three distinct classes, numbered as III, II and I Class. Each class lasts six months in duration and cadets must successfully complete each component to graduate and receive their commission. Throughout the course, cadets receive training in leadership, tactics, weapons systems, military law, military accounting systems, corporate governance and military history. The course is designed to test the cadets physically and mentally and graduation is by no means guaranteed. Upon graduating, cadets are promoted to the rank of lieutenant and receive a Diploma in Military Leadership.

Within the full-time course, there are two streams of cadets arriving at Duntroon; those that enter from the Australian Defence Force Academy and those that enter through the direct entry method. Direct Entry cadets complete the eighteen-month course, whilst cadets from ADFA join Duntroon in II Class, combining with the Direct Entry cadets and completing twelve months at the college. The leadership and military training provided at ADFA during the three years of training is considered the equivalent of III Class at RMC.

The college also oversees the program for training officers in the Australian Army Reserve. Upon appointment to the Reserves, members join a University Regiment within their location and then undertake their training over the course of five modules run by the various University Regiments around Australia. Additionally, they are required to parade at their unit one night a week and one weekend a month. The final six-and-a-half-week module of the Reserve officer course is conducted at Duntroon. In January 2008, the Part-time Officers course was shortened to a duration of 104 days, with further employment training, specific to Corps allocation, conducted thereafter.

In 2003, the Officer Tertiary Recruitment Scheme (OTRS) was introduced, which involves the recruitment of officers enrolled in tertiary study. Essentially, this program involves undergraduate sponsorship of university students, who are appointed as Officer Cadets in the Australian Regular Army, while they study. During their tertiary study, they train with the applicable University Regiment as reservists and conduct modules of training as they are able to fit in around their studies. At the conclusion of their study (provided they have completed the necessary modules) they enroll at Duntroon in II Class.

In 2024 a two year trial of a modified officer training schedule - described by the Australian Defence Department as a contemporary approach to officer training - was established to replace the 18 month training program previously run at Duntroon (the program adopted after the transfer of university studies to The Australian Defence Force Academy in 1986 and the focus of Duntroon strictly on Army officer military training). Scheduled to conclude in December 2025, the new program shortened the 18 month training program to a 12-month officer commissioning program (OCP), comprising six modules that include practical applications of leadership, command, foundation warfighting and military planning.

== The Band of the Royal Military College, Duntroon ==
The Band of the Royal Military College, Duntroon has been in existence in some shape or form since 1916 when a part-time band was established from volunteers drawn from the riding staff. Nevertheless, it was not until 1954 that they were officially established, when a band formed from members of the Regular Army was established at the college. In 1968 it became part of the Australian Army Band Corps and since then it has become a regular feature of the ceremonies and parades conducted at the college, as well as at other events around Australia and overseas. Perhaps the most notable of these performances was in 2000, when the Band accompanied a detachment of the Australian Federation Guard to Great Britain where, as part of the celebrations of the centenary of Australia's federation, the AFG mounted the Queen's Guard at Buckingham Palace, while the RMC Band provided the Guards Band. Recently the band has also supported Australian troops serving overseas.

In the 1980s the band began performing shows for local charities, known as the "Strike up the Band" shows and this continues today, albeit under the guise of the "Music at Midday" shows which the band performs six times a year, with proceeds going to local charities.

== Buildings and features ==
The College itself is situated at the foot of Mount Pleasant on the Duntroon estate. The base is one of the only military bases in Australia that is open to the general public, consisting of a large area of land incorporating a golf course, a library, a residential area for Defence members and their families, various area logistics and infrastructure units, a military hospital, a retail area, vast sporting facilities and the Australian Defence Force Academy.

The ship's bell from MV Duntroon (which served as a troopship from 1942 to 1949) was removed when the ship was sold by her Australian owners in 1960, and was presented to the College in 1978. It is now positioned at the base of the flag station near the parade ground and is used daily as part of the cadets' flag duties. Many of the original buildings from when the college was first opened in 1911 still stand and continue to be used today, having been heritage listed. An example of this is the officers' mess, known as 'Duntroon House', which is an imposing stone building, that was actually built as the Campbell family's house before the land was purchased by the Crown.

The Majura Training Area is located nearby and is currently where cadets from the College undertake the majority of their basic field training in III Class.

The Anzac Memorial Chapel of St Paul was opened on 30 April 1966. The chapel has a common foyer with two specific chapels: Anglican/Protestant Denominations and Catholic. Retired Colours are displayed in the foyer. Also in the foyer is a perpetual light that is lit while former cadets are on operations with the ADF. The chapel is also used for the Graduation Church Parade. Beside the main chapel is the Changi Chapel, which was reconstructed on the site and rededicated in August 1988.

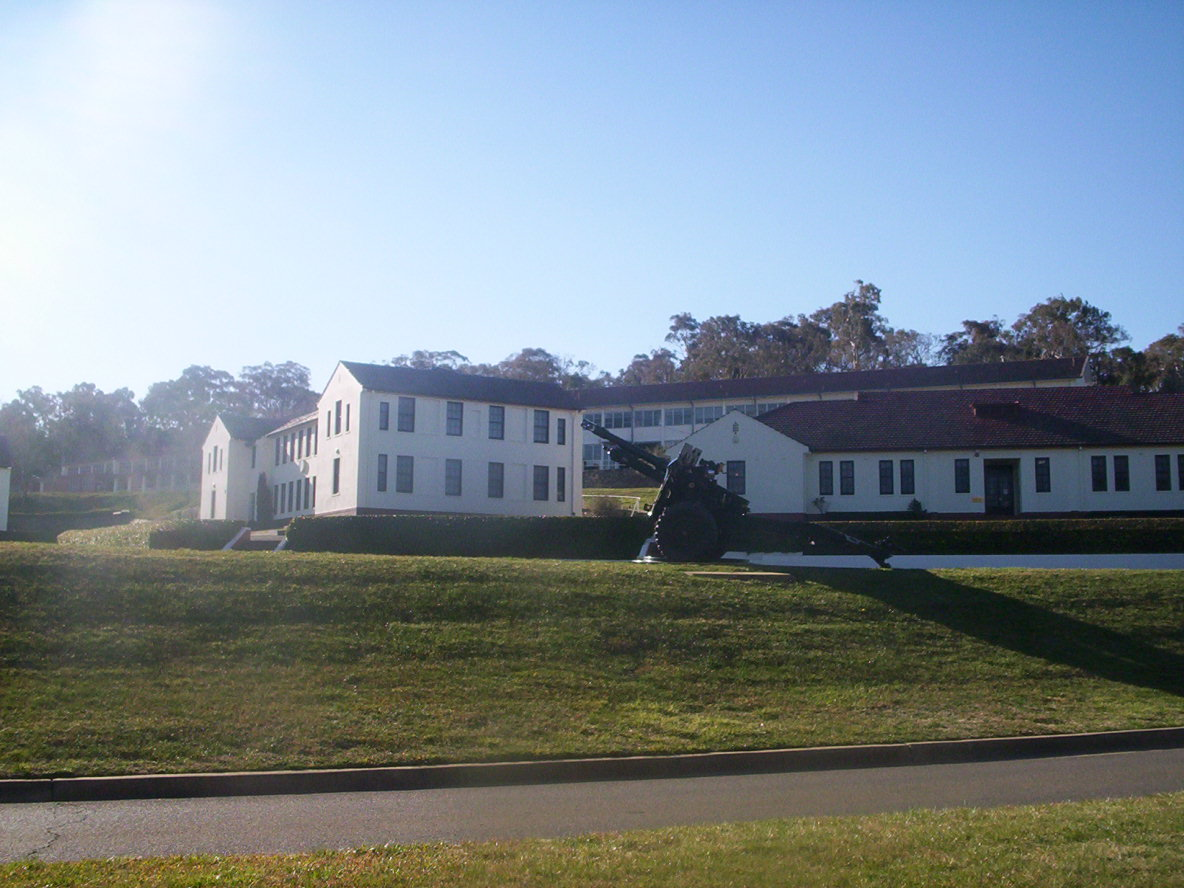
View of the library and the Long Tan Company, Forbes Block building, from below the parade ground

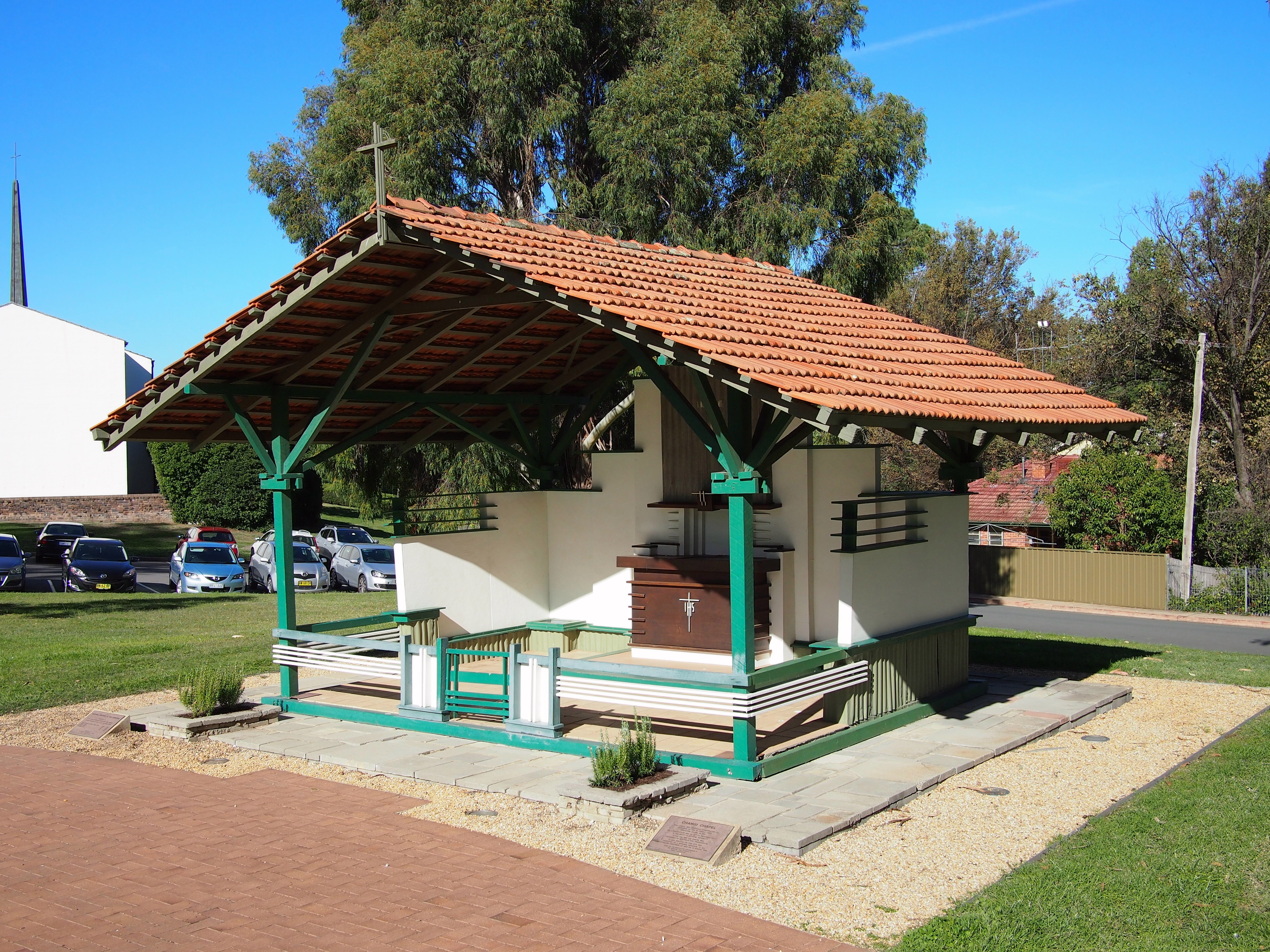
Changi chapel, built by Australian POWs in 1944, later relocated to Duntroon, Canberra

ANZAC Memorial Chapel of St. Paul

Memorial wall

Bell tower

Time capsule to be opened by 2061

== Graduation awards ==
There are two main awards presented to cadets upon graduation: the King's Medal and the Sword of Honour. The King's Medal is awarded to the cadet graduating top of their class academically. It was originally instituted in 1919, and all cadets, including foreign cadets attending the college, are eligible. Indeed, Singaporean cadets established a long tradition of receiving this honour, doing so in 1975, 1978, 1979, 1980 and 1982 according to a 1986 source. The Sword of Honour is awarded to the cadet who displays "exemplary conduct and performance of duty" throughout their course.

== Reserve Units of the Royal Military College – Australia ==
In 1997 the Royal Military College took responsibility for overseeing the training provided to Reserve officer cadets and as a result in 1998 the Royal Military College of Australia was established as a formation. As a part of this formation, the following University Regiments were placed under the college's command:

- Melbourne University Regiment (MUR)
- Monash University Regiment (MonUR)
- Queensland University Regiment (QUR) (Including North Queensland Company)
- University of New South Wales Regiment (UNSWR)
- Sydney University Regiment (SUR) (Including Australian National University (ANU) Company)
- Adelaide Universities Regiment (AUR) (Including Northern Australia Platoon)
- Western Australia University Regiment (WAUR)
- University of Tasmania Company (UTC).

In July 2008, however, responsibility for Reserve officer training was taken away from Duntroon, and these units were placed under the command of the 2nd Division, with each regiment reporting directly to its parent brigade unit. Nevertheless, they continue to follow the Duntroon curriculum in modularised format, and Reserve officer cadets attend the college for their final four-week training block prior to commissioning.

== Commandants ==
The following officers served as commandants of the college:

Ordinal	Rank	Name	Term start	Term end	Notes
1	Brigadier General	William Throsby Bridges CMG	1910	1914	
2	Major General	John William Parnell CMG	1914	1920	
3	Major General	James Gordon Legge CB, CMG	1920	1922	
4	Colonel Commandant	Francis Bede Heritage CBE, MVO	1922	1929	
5	Brigadier	Eric Fairweather Harrison	1929	1931	
−	Brigadier	Francis Bede Heritage CBE, MVO	1931	1931	
6	Major General	Julius Henry Bruche CB, CMG	1931	1931	
7	Lieutenant Colonel	Douglas Henry Pratt DSO, MC	1931	1931	(Note: Pratt was a British officer serving on exchange with the Australian Army. He is the only non-Australian officer to serve in the role as commandant of Duntroon. Moore 2001, p. 428.)
−	Brigadier	Francis Bede Heritage CBE, MVO	1931	1932	
8	Colonel	John Lavarack CMG, DSO	1933	1935	
9	Brigadier	Charles Miles CMG, DSO	1935	1939	
10	Brigadier	Eric Plant DSO & Bar, OBE	1939	1940	
−	Brigadier	Eric Fairweather Harrison	1940	1942	
11	Brigadier	Bertrand Combes CBE	1942	1945	
12	Brigadier	Eric Lacy Vowles MC	1945	1948	
13	Major General	Henry Wells CBE, DSO	1949	1951	
14	Major General	Ronald Hopkins CBE	1951	1954	
15	Major General	Ian Campbell CBE, DSO & Bar	1954	1957	
16	Major General	John Wilton CBE, DSO	1957	1960	
17	Major General	Robert Knights CB, CBE	1960	1962	
18	Major General	Charles Finlay CB, CBE	1962	1968	
19	Major General	Colin Fraser CBE	1968	1970	
20	Major General	Sandy Pearson DSO, OBE, MC	1970	1973	
21	Major General	Bob Hay CB, MBE	1973	1977	
22	Major General	Alan Morrison AO, DSO, MBE	1977	1981	
23	Major General	John Kelly DSO	1981	1983	
24	Major General	John Coates MBE	1983	1984	
25	Major General	Barry Hockney AO	1984	1987	
26	Major General	Murray Blake AM, MC	1987	1990	
27	Brigadier	Rodney Curtis AM, MC	1990	1993	
28	Brigadier	Simon Willis	1993	1995	
29	Brigadier	Brian Stevens	1995	1996	
30	Brigadier	Peter Cosgrove AM, MC	1997	1998	
31	Brigadier	Peter Pursey AM	1999	1999	(Note: Pursey was the first graduate of OTU Scheyville to serve as commandant of Duntroon.)
32	Brigadier	Maurie McNarn AO	1999	2001	
33	Brigadier	Michael Paramor AM	2002	2003	
34	Brigadier	Chris Appleton	2004	2005	
35	Brigadier	Mark Bornholt AM	2006	2008	
36	Brigadier	Mick Moon DSC, AM	2009	2011	
37	Brigadier	David Luhrs CSC	2011	2013	
38	Brigadier	Diane Gallasch AM, CSC	2013	2016	
39	Brigadier	Mark Brewer CSC & Bar	2016	2018	
40	Brigadier	Rupert Hoskin AM	2018	2019	
41	Brigadier	Ana Duncan CSC	2020	2022	
42	Brigadier	Jason Groat CSC, DSM	2023	2025	
43	Brigadier	Andrew Moss AM, CSM	2025	Incumbent	

== Plaque ==
In 2010, a plaque dedicated to RMC graduates was placed on the ACT Honour Walk. It reads:

Situated at the former Campbell homestead at Duntroon, the RMC was opened on 27 June 1911 by the Governor-General, Lord Dudley. The first Commandant was Colonel (later Major-General) William Throsby Bridges, who was killed at Gallipoli. RMC was created to oversee the initial military training of all officers in the Australian Army. As one of the first institutions to be established in Canberra, RMC has been integral to the life of the ACT. The RMC Band regularly performs at ceremonial and community events. Since its establishment, RMC graduates have served in every military conflict in which Australia has been involved.

== See also ==
- Australian Defence College
- Australian Defence Force Academy
- Officer Cadet School, Portsea
- Officer Training Unit, Scheyville
- Royal Australian Naval College
- RAAF College
