= Stanley Legge =

Australian general

Stanley Ferguson Legge
- Born: 24 April 1900; Turramurra, New South Wales
- Died: 25 July 1977 (aged 77); Kallista, Victoria
- Relatives: Lieutenant General James Gordon Legge (father)
- Military career
- Allegiance: Australia
- Branch: Australian Army
- Service years: 1918–1957
- Rank: Major General
- Conflicts: Second World War
- Awards: Commander of the Order of the British Empire; Mentioned in Despatches

Major General Stanley Ferguson Legge, CBE (24 April 1900 – 25 July 1977) was a senior Australian Army officer. The son of Lieutenant General James Gordon Legge, he was born in Turramurra, New South Wales and died in Kallista, Victoria.
