= Neil Mackenzie Freeman =

Australian Army officer

Neil Freeman
- Born: 21 April 1890; Geelong, Victoria
- Died: 7 November 1961 (aged 71); Newtown, Victoria
- Military career
- Allegiance: Australia
- Branch: Australian Imperial Force; Citizen Military Forces
- Service years: 1915–1943
- Rank: Brigadier
- Commands: 6th Brigade (1941–43); 4th Brigade (1940–41); 6th Brigade (1932–39); 23rd Battalion (1921–27); 2nd/23rd Battalion (1919–21); 31st Battalion (1918–19)
- Conflicts: First World War; Western Front; Battle of Fromelles; Battle of Passchendaele; Battle of Polygon Wood; German spring offensive; Second Battle of Villers-Bretonneux; Hundred Days Offensive; Battle of Amiens; Battle of St Quentin Canal
- Awards: Distinguished Service Order; Efficiency Decoration; Mentioned in Despatches
Australian rules football career
Personal information
- Original team: East Geelong (GDFA)
- Height: 183 cm (6 ft 0 in)
- Weight: 78 kg (172 lb)
- Position: Fullback
Playing career^{1}
Years	Club	Games (Goals)
1911–14	Geelong	45 (1)
- ^{1} Playing statistics correct to the end of 1914.

Brigadier Neil Mackenzie Freeman, DSO, ED (21 April 1890 – 7 November 1961) was a senior officer of the Australian Army and an Australian rules footballer who played with Geelong in the Victorian Football League (VFL).

== First World War ==
After a four-year senior football career, he served in the infantry during the First World War, rising to the rank of major within the Australian Imperial Force and receiving the Distinguished Service Order in November 1917 for actions during the Battle of Polygon Wood, serving with the 58th Battalion and then the 31st, both of which he commanded briefly. He was awarded a Distinguished Service Order for "gallant services in the Battle of Polygon Wood" in 1917 and was Mentioned in Despatches.

== Legal career and later life ==
After his discharge from the service, he returned to his city of birth – Geelong – to work as a councillor, standing for election to the Australian Parliament. He became a solicitor, holding a law degree from the University of Melbourne, and worked for a law firm before setting up his own practice.

Following the outbreak of the Second World War in September 1939, Freeman returned to the armed forces and rose to the rank of brigadier. He was discharged from the army on 3 July 1943; his last posting was to the 3rd Military District's infantry training brigade.
