= Bertrand Combes =

Australian soldier

- Born: 13 April 1894; Goulburn, New South Wales
- Died: 12 April 1971 (aged 76); Camberwell, Victoria
- Burial place: Springvale Botanical Cemetery
- Military career
- Allegiance: Australia
- Branch: Australian Army
- Service years: 1912–1947
- Rank: Brigadier
- Commands: Royal Military College, Duntroon (1942–45)
- Conflicts: First World War; Gallipoli campaign; Landing at Anzac Cove; Second World War; New Guinea campaign
- Awards: Commander of the Order of the British Empire

Brigadier Bertrand Combes, CBE (13 April 1894 – 12 April 1971) was an Australian soldier who served during the First World War and Second World War.

== Early life ==
Combes was the only son of Algernon James Ernest Combes and his wife Catherine, née Weingarth.

== Military career ==
Combes was commissioned into the Australian Military Forces in 1914 and landed at Gallipoli with the 14th Battalion on 25 April 1915. During operations in the Monash Valley, he was shot in the chest on 2 May 1915. He was evacuated and recovered in hospital in Egypt. Combes met Rosa Marion Ellis Begg, a nurse, in Egypt, they were married on 15 April 1916.

Combes was the commandant of the Royal Military College, Duntroon from 1942, until 1945. He was appointed a Commander of the Order of the British Empire in June 1944.
