= 5th Battalion (Australia) =

- Active: 1914–1919; 1921–1944; 1948–1960; 1965–1982
- Country: Australia
- Allegiance: Commonwealth of Australia
- Branch: Australian Army
- Type: Infantry
- Role: Line infantry
- Size: 1,023 officers and other ranks
- Part of: 2nd Brigade, 1st Division
- Colours: Black over red
- Engagements: World War I: Gallipoli campaign; Western Front

Insignia
- Unit colour patch

The 5th Battalion was an infantry battalion of the Australian Army. Raised in Victoria as part of the First Australian Imperial Force for service during World War I, the battalion formed part of the 2nd Brigade, attached to the 1st Division. It participated in the landing at Anzac Cove on 25 April 1915, coming ashore in the second wave, before taking part in the fighting at Krithia and then at Lone Pine. In December 1915, the battalion was withdrawn from the peninsula and returned to Egypt where it was involved in defending the Suez Canal until being transferred to the Western Front in France in early 1916. After that, over the course of the next two and a half years the 5th Battalion was rotated in and out of the front line and took part in a number of significant battles including at Pozieres, Ypres, Amiens and the Hindenburg Line. Following the end of the war, the battalion was disbanded and its personnel returned to Australia. The battalion was re-raised during the inter-war years as a part-time unit and was later mobilised during World War II, but did not serve overseas. During the post war period, the battalion has existed at various times before being subsumed into the 5th/6th Battalion, Royal Victoria Regiment.

== History ==
=== World War I ===
Following the outbreak of World War I, Australia began raising an all-volunteer force for overseas service. Due to the provisions of the Defence Act 1903, which precluded sending conscripts overseas to fight, it was decided not to send the militia units that were already in existence, but instead to raise new battalions as part of the Australian Imperial Force (AIF). Many of the previously existing militia units chose to enlist together in the AIF and in order to maintain a degree of esprit de corps these men were often allocated to the same AIF unit. As a result, many AIF units retained the identity and traditions of their parent militia units. Many of the 5th Battalion's members had previously served with the Victorian Scottish Regiment—a Melbourne-based militia unit—including the battalion's first commanding officer, Lieutenant Colonel David Stanley Wanliss, who would later go on to become the Chief Justice of New Guinea after the war.

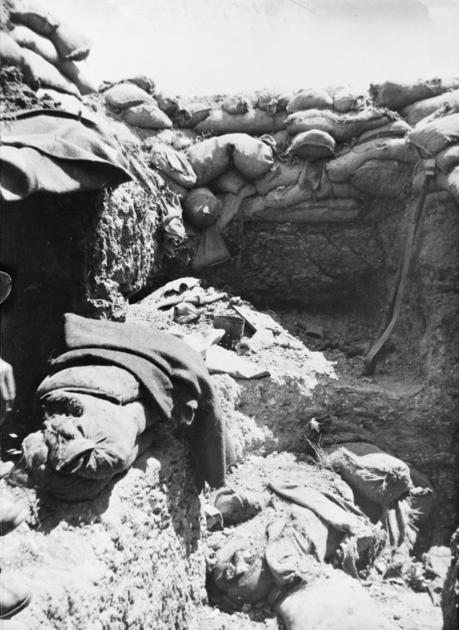
A trench held by the 5th Battalion around "MacLaurin's Hill" on the Gallipoli Peninsula

Such was the enthusiasm with which Australians volunteered at the start of the war, that the battalion was raised within two weeks. After a period of just two months basic training, they left Australia and proceeded to Egypt, arriving on 2 December 1914. A further period of training took place, before the battalion was committed to the Gallipoli Campaign. It took part in the Landing at Anzac Cove on 25 April 1915, as part of the second wave. Ten days after the landing the 2nd Brigade was transferred from Anzac Cove to Cape Helles to assist in the attack on Krithia. In August, the battalion took part in the Battle of Lone Pine. The battalion continued to serve at Gallipoli until the evacuation in December when the battalion returned to Egypt.

During this time the AIF underwent an expansion from two infantry divisions, to five and many members of the 5th Battalion were used to raise the 57th Battalion. In March 1916, the battalion sailed to France and deployed to the Somme, seeing action at Pozières in July 1916, followed by Ypres, in Belgium, before returning to the Somme in winter.

Throughout 1917, the 5th Battalion was involved in operations against the Hindenburg Line, before being involved in the Battle of Passchendaele between June and November 1917. In 1918, the battalion helped to stop the German spring offensive in March and April. The battalion subsequently participated in the greatest Allied offensive of 1918, launched near Amiens on 8 August 1918. The battalion continued operations to late September 1918, when the Australian Corps was withdrawn from the front line for a period of rest and training. Consequently, when the armistice came into effect on 11 November 1918, the battalion was out of the line. During the war, a total of 970 members of the battalion were killed, while a further 2,013 were wounded. Members of the battalion received the following awards: two Companions of the Order of St Michael and St George, five Distinguished Service Orders, one Officer of the Order of the British Empire, 23 Military Crosses and one Bar, 24 Distinguished Conduct Medals with one Bar, 202 Military Medals with six Bars and one second bar, six Meritorious Service Medals and 47 Mentions in Despatches.

Soon after the fighting ended the long process of demobilisation and repatriation began and men from the battalion began marching out to begin the journey back to Australia. Slowly the 5th Battalion's numbers dwindled and by April 1919, it was amalgamated with the 8th Battalion. This battalion was then later amalgamated with another, formed from the 6th and 7th Battalions, to form the 2nd Brigade Battalion.

=== Inter-war years and subsequent service ===
The demobilisation process was finally completed by early 1920 and in April 1921 the AIF was officially disbanded. After this it was decided to preserve the honours of the AIF units by bestowing their battle honours and unit designations upon the militia units with which they had been affiliated. As a result of this, the Victorian Scottish Regiment was redesignated the 5th Battalion (Victorian Scottish Regiment) and was entrusted with the 5th Battalion's battle honours, as the battalion was re-raised from elements of the 5th, 46th and 60th Infantry Regiments and the 29th Light Horse Regiment within Victoria.

During World War II, the battalion remained in Australia undertaking garrison duties. As a Militia unit, it was precluded under the terms of the Defence Act from serving overseas, but in 1943 it was gazetted as an "AIF" battalion after the majority of its personnel volunteered for overseas service. Nevertheless, it was disbanded on 16 October 1944 as surplus to Army requirements. Following the war, Australia's part-time military force was re-formed in 1948 under the guise of the Citizens Military Force, and the battalion was re-raised at this time. Later, in 1960, this regiment was absorbed into the Royal Victoria Regiment, forming 'A' Company within the Pentropic 1st Battalion, and its colours laid up in Scots' Church, Melbourne. When the Pentropic system was discontinued in July 1965, the 5th was re-formed as a full battalion, known as 5 RVR. In the late 1980s, it was merged into the 5th/6th Battalion, Royal Victoria Regiment.

== Battle honours ==
The 5th Battalion received the following battle honours:

- South Africa 1899–1902 (inherited);
- Somme 1918, Pozieres, Bullecourt, Ypres 1917, Menin Road, Polygon Wood, Broodseinde, Poelcappelle, Passchendaele, Lys, Hazebrouck, Amiens, Albert 1918, Hindenburg Line, Hindenburg Line, Epehy, France and Flanders 1916–1918, Helles, Krithia, ANZAC, Landing at ANZAC, Defence at ANZAC, Suvla.
