= Victorian Scottish Regiment =

The Victorian Scottish Regiment
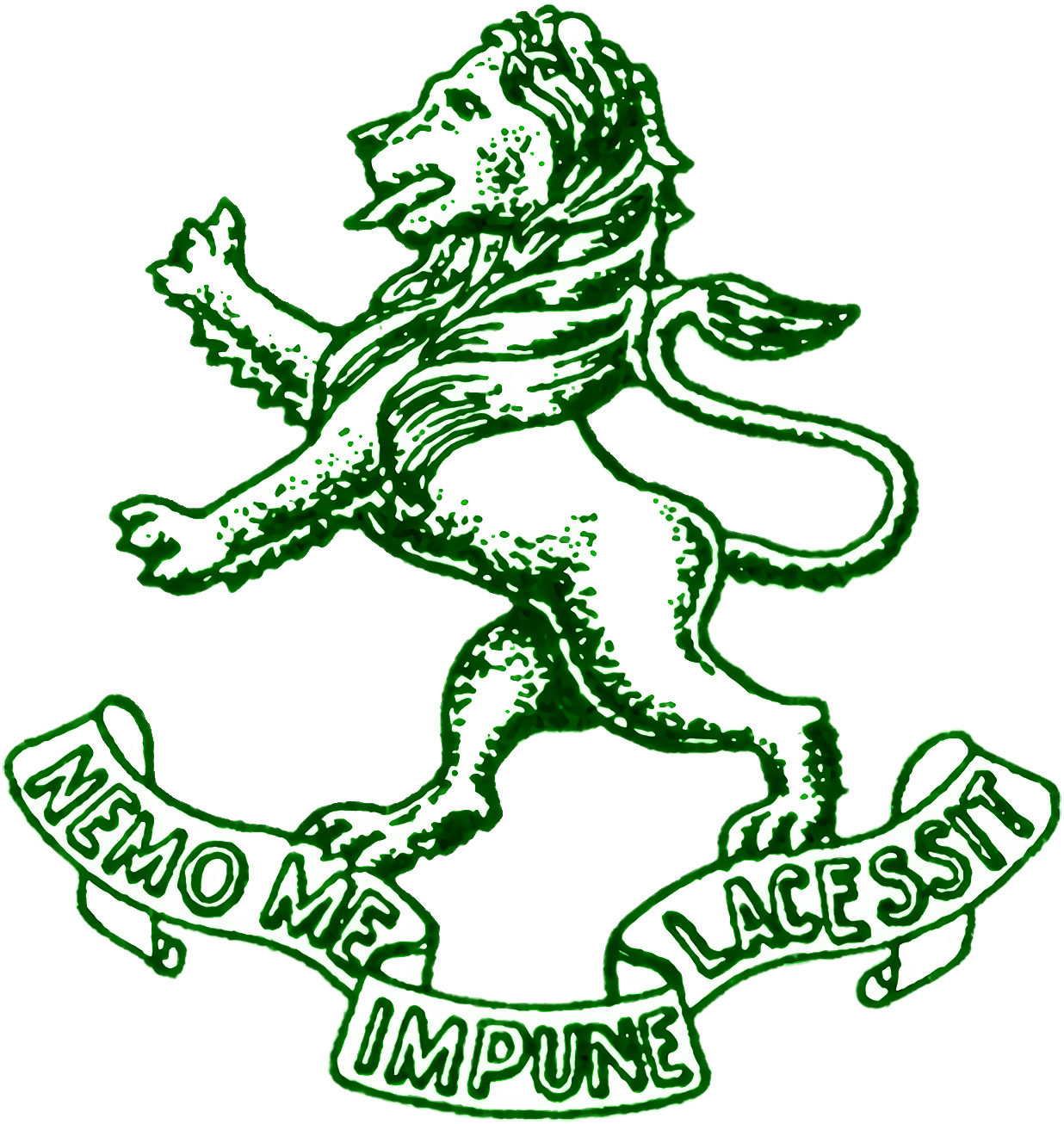
- Cap badge of 5th Bn, The Victorian Scottish Regiment
- Active: 1898–1960 and perpetuated by 5/6 Bn, The Royal Victoria Regiment
- Country: Australia
- Branch: Citizen Military Forces
- Type: Infantry
- Role: Light infantry
- Size: One battalion
- Part of: Royal Australian Infantry Corps
- Garrison/HQ: 5th Battalion — Hawthorn and others
- Motto: Nemo Me Impune Lacessit (No one hurts me with impunity)
- March: 5th/6th Battalion — Cock of the North

Commanders
- Colonel-in-Chief: HM The Queen (Australian Infantry Corps)

Insignia
- Unit colour patch
- Tartan: Gordon

The Victorian Scottish Regiment (VSR) was an infantry regiment of the Australian Army. Formed in 1898 as a volunteer unit of the colonial Victorian Military Forces, the unit went through a number of changes in name over the course of its 62-year history. During World War I many of its members volunteered for overseas service and saw action at Gallipoli and on the Western Front in France. Following the end of the war, the regiment was reorganised to perpetuate the honours of the 5th Battalion, AIF. During World War II the battalion was employed on garrison duties in Australia, although many of its members volunteered for overseas service and fought in campaigns in North Africa, the Middle East and New Guinea. Following the war, the battalion was re-raised as part of the Citizen Military Forces and undertook the training of national servicemen until 1960 when the unit was disbanded and absorbed into the 1st Battalion, Royal Victoria Regiment. Today, the regiment's traditions are maintained by 'B' Company, 5th/6th Battalion, Royal Victoria Regiment.

== History ==
The Victorian Scottish Regiment (VSR) was first raised on 29 August 1898, following representations by members of the local Scottish Community and Caledonian association for several years, for the establishment of Scottish unit. Notable members of this group were Sir John McIntyre, Sir Malcolm McEachren, Colonel Otter, Richard Linton, W. B. Jarvie and W. J. McKirdie. The regiment was formed at Albert Park, with a parade ground at Victoria Barracks, and was originally raised as a corps of unpaid volunteers as part of the colonial Victorian Military Forces. Initially the regiment was only issued with a limited about of equipment and had to parade in plain clothes for almost a year until uniforms could be provided.

In 1902, the volunteer system was changed to a system of partially paid militia and the military forces of the former independent colonies became part of the Commonwealth Military Forces. In 1911 a compulsory training scheme was introduced, which required all able-bodied men between the ages of 18 and 21 to undertake a period of military training. At this time, the regiment was redesignated as the 52nd Australian Infantry Battalion (Victorian Scottish Regiment), and voluntary enlistment was restricted to officers and senior non-commissioned officers.

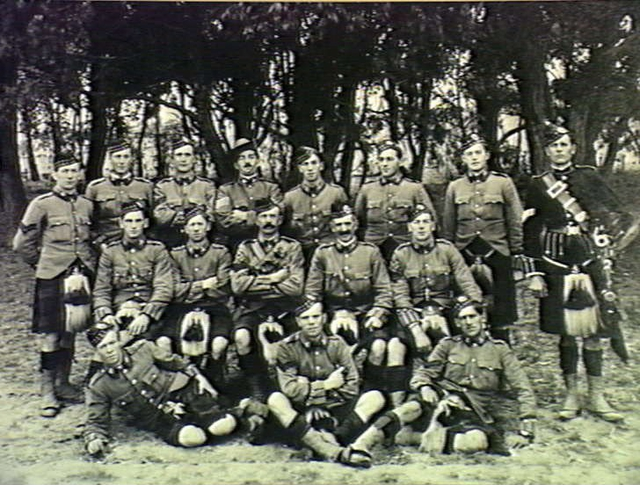
Members of the 52nd Australian Infantry Battalion (Victorian Scottish Regiment) in Melbourne, c. 1914. AWM Image # P00591.017

Upon the outbreak of World War I the decision was made not to deploy the previously existing militia units to the fighting overseas due to the provisions of the Defence Act 1903 which precluded sending conscripts outside of Australia. An all-volunteer force, known as the First Australian Imperial Force was raised instead and many members of the militia volunteered for overseas service. One of the units raised for overseas service was the 5th Battalion, and many members of the 52nd Australian Infantry Battalion joined this unit, including the battalion's commanding officer, Colonel David Stanley Wanliss, who would later become Chief Justice of New Guinea. This battalion fought at during the Gallipoli campaign and on the Western Front and many of the men continued to wear the VSR's distinctive Glengarry caps.

During the war, the militia units remained in Australia on home service, providing security at ports, defence installations and other facilities of importance to the war effort, however, due to the large numbers of militiamen that volunteered for service with the AIF many of these units were greatly depleted and it was not until after the war, in 1919, that the compulsory training scheme began again. In 1921 the AIF was officially disbanded and the following month it was decided to reorganise the militia units and to redesignate them in order to perpetuate the identity of the AIF units that had fought in the war. As a result of this decision, and due to the links that the regiment had with the 5th Battalion, AIF, the regiment was redesignated as the 5th Battalion and inherited that unit's battle honours. In 1925 permission was granted for the unit to adopt the traditional title of the regiment. In 1929, following the election of the Scullin Labor government, the compulsory training scheme was suspended again and a period of austerity followed as the impact of the Great Depression meant that there were few volunteers and few training opportunities as funding for defence was greatly reduced.

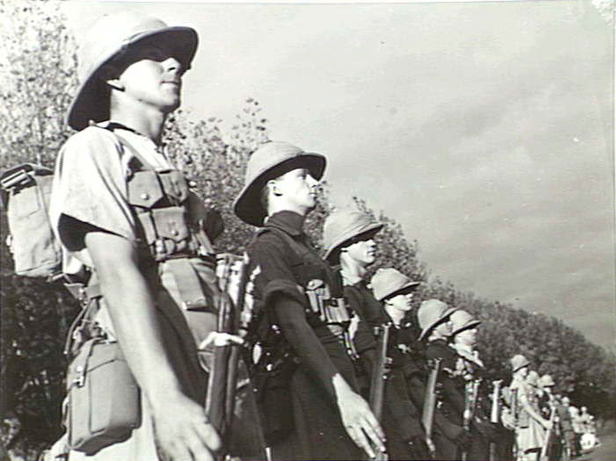
Members of the 5th Battalion, VSR on parade in April 1940. In early 1940 the battalion was called up for a three-month period of continuous service as part of nation's mobilisation during World War II. AWM Image # 001246

Following the outbreak of World War II the battalion was called up for a three-month period of compulsory training in early 1940, before later being sent to Western Australia and then Darwin, Northern Territory where they carried out garrison duties throughout the war. Many members of the battalion also volunteered for service overseas with the Second Australian Imperial Force, serving with the 2/5th Battalion, which fought in Libya, Greece, Crete, Syria and New Guinea.

In 1948, the 5th Battalion (Victorian Scottish Regiment) was re-raised as part of the Citizen Military Forces (CMF), which was the forerunner to the Australian Army Reserve. Commanded by Lieutenant-Colonel George Warfe, a highly decorated officer that had previously served with a number of commando units during the war, the battalion was headquartered at Hawthorn and had depots at Dandenong, Kew, Armadale and Surrey Hills. National service was reintroduced in 1951 and following this the battalion took on the responsibility of training national servicemen under this scheme. This continued until 1960, when the national service scheme was suspended and the Australian Army was reorganised around the Pentropic division.

As a result of this reorganisation the CMF was greatly reduced, as fourteen infantry battalions were disbanded altogether, while the seventeen that remained gave up their old regional regimental ties and were reformed as part of the six newly raised State-based regiments. As a result of this, it was decided that the 5th Battalion (Victorian Scottish Regiment) would be disbanded and its members be absorbed into the newly raised Royal Victoria Regiment, being used to form two companies—'B' and Support—of the 1st Battalion, Royal Victoria Regiment. In 1965, when the decision was made to reintroduce national service and abandon the Pentropic division, the CMF was reorganised again. At the same time the decision was made to reintroduce the designations of the old militia units by splitting the two Pentropic battalions of the Royal Victoria Regiment to form four full battalions and one independent company. As a result, the 5th Battalion, Royal Victoria Regiment was formed in May 1965, although with the end of national service in 1972 the battalion's numbers began to decline and by 1975 the decision was made to amalgamate the unit into the 1st Battalion, Royal Victoria Regiment.

In 1982, the 5th/6th Battalion, Royal Victoria Regiment (5/6 RVR) was raised in Melbourne, Victoria. Today, 'B' Coy, 5/6 RVR maintains the traditions of the Victorian Scottish Regiment.

== Colours laid up in Scots' Church ==
In light of the long association between the Victorian Scottish Regiment and Scots' Church, Melbourne the colours reside in the church, identified by three plaques. As such, the centennial of the raising of the Victorian Scottish Regiment was marked by a church parade attended by former members of the regiment and 'B' Company, 5th/6th Battalion, The Royal Victoria Regiment.

== Pipes and Drums ==
Formed in 1899 as part of the Victorian Scottish Regiment, the 5/6RVR Pipes and Drums is now the band for all battalions of the Royal Victoria Regiment.

== Lineage ==
1898–1911 – Victorian Scottish Regiment
1911–1919 – 52nd Australian Infantry Battalion (Victorian Scottish Regiment)
1919–1921 – 2nd/5th Infantry
1921–1925 – 5th Battalion
1925–1946 – 5th Battalion (Victorian Scottish Regiment)
1948–1960 – 5th Battalion (Victorian Scottish Regiment).

== Alliances ==
- United Kingdom — once The Gordon Highlanders, then Highlanders (Seaforth, Gordons and Camerons), now Royal Regiment of Scotland
- Canada — The Toronto Scottish Regiment, via Gordon Alliance
- Canada — 48th Highlanders of Canada, via Gordon Alliance
- South Africa — Cape Town Highlanders Regiment, via Gordon Alliance.

== See also ==
- List of Australian Army Regiments
- Colonial forces of Australia
