= 38th Battalion (Australia) =

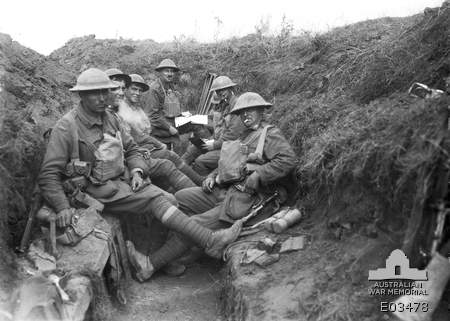
- Soldiers from the 38th Battalion at Guillemont, 29 September 1918 Members of the 38th Battalion in Dog Trench near Guillemont Farm, in which they were held by machine gun fire during the attack on the Hindenburg Line, near Bony. Identified, left to right: 5918 Private (Pte) Binion; 967 Sergeant A. E. Pegler MM; 3020 Corporal H. Amiet MM; Captain C. H. Peters MC; unidentified soldier (almost completely obscured by Buckland); 763 Company Sergeant Major (CSM) R. J. Buckland MM (smoking a pipe); 6217 Pte G. Bain.
- Active: 1915–1919; 1921–1929; 1936–1944; 1948–1960
- Country: Australia
- Branch: Australian Army
- Type: Infantry
- Part of: 10th Brigade, 3rd Division (1915–1919)
- Motto: Honorem Custodite
- Colours: Purple over red
- March: Sussex by the Sea
- Engagements: World War I: Western Front

Insignia
- Unit colour patch

The 38th Battalion was an infantry battalion of the Australian Army. Originally formed in 1916 for service overseas during World War I as part of the Australian Imperial Force (AIF), the battalion was recruited from the state of Victoria and formed part of the 10th Brigade, 3rd Division. It served throughout the war on the Western Front before being disbanded in 1919. During the inter-war years, the battalion was re-raised as a part-time military unit and during the World War II undertook garrison duties in Australia, but did not see combat. After the war, it was re-formed in Victoria and was eventually subsumed into the Royal Victoria Regiment, with its honours and traditions being preserved by the 8th/7th Battalion, Royal Victoria Regiment.

== History ==
=== World War I ===
The 38th Battalion was originally raised in early 1916 for service during World War I, under the command of Lieutenant Colonel Charles Davis. Part of the all volunteer Australian Imperial Force (AIF), it formed part of the 10th Brigade, attached to the 3rd Division. Like the other units of the 3rd Division, which was formed as part of an expansion of the AIF after the Gallipoli Campaign, the battalion was raised in Australia, undertaking rudimentary training in Bendigo, Victoria, before being moved to Campbellfield, Victoria, after an outbreak of cerebro-spinal meningitis resulted in several deaths. Upon the conclusion of their initial training, the 3rd Division was transported by sea to the United Kingdom where they undertook further training before arriving on the Western Front in November 1916.

For the next two years the 38th Battalion fought in the trenches in France and Belgium. Their first action came in late February 1917, when the battalion contributed a 400-man detachment to a short raid on German-held trenches. After this, the battalion undertook its first significant battle around Messines in Belgium in early June. An action that was fought to secure the Wytschaete–Messines Ridge, which was located south of the salient that had formed in the line around Ypres, the battle proved to be a successful, but costly introduction to the European battlefield for the 3rd Division. Later in the year, the 38th took part in the Battles of Broodseinde and Passchendaele, during which they suffered heavily, losing almost 30 percent casualties in the first battle and then over 60 in the second. It remained in Belgium through the winter before being moved to France in early 1918.

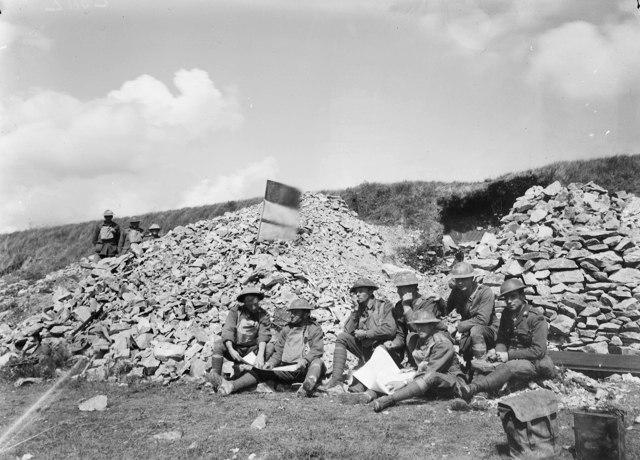
Headquarters staff from the 38th Battalion around Bray, in the Somme Valley, 26 August 1918.

In March 1918, the Germans launched the Spring Offensive, after the collapse of Tsarist Russia ended the fighting on the Eastern Front and allowed the Germans to transfer a large number of troops to the west. The offensive steadily pushed the Allies back towards Paris, and as a result the Australian divisions were brought south from Belgium to the Somme to help restore the situation. In late March, the battalion took part in a defensive action around Dernancourt. After the offensive had been halted, in August the Allies launched the Hundred Days Offensive, which ultimately brought about an end to the war. The 38th Battalion was placed in reserve during the first day of the offensive around Amiens on 8 August, and therefore fought their first major action of the offensive around Proyart on 10 August. A series of advances followed as the Allies sought to break through the Hindenburg Line, with the 3rd Division advancing through the Somme Valley. In October 1918, the Australian divisions were withdrawn from the line for rest and reorganisation, and as a consequence the 38th Battalion's final involvement in the war came around the St Quentin Canal, where the heavily depleted Australian divisions were bolstered by fresh American divisions. After the cessation of hostilities in November, the AIF was demobilised and the 38th Battalion was disbanded in April 1919. During the war, the 38th Battalion's casualties amounted to 499 killed and 1,478 wounded. The battalion received 14 battle honours for its involvement in the fighting on the Western Front in 1927.

=== Inter-war years ===
During the inter-war years, Australia's part-time military force, the Citizens Force, was reorganised in 1921 to perpetuate the numerical designations of the AIF. As a part of this, the 38th Battalion was re-raised in Victoria, drawing personnel and lineage from the 2nd Battalion, 38th Infantry Regiment and the 5th Battalion, 38th Infantry Regiment, through which it inherited the theatre honour of "South Africa 1899–1902", which had been awarded to its predecessor units in 1908. Upon formation, the battalion was assigned to the 6th Brigade within the 3rd Military District. In 1927, when territorial titles were adopted, the battalion became known as the "38th Battalion (The Bendigo Regiment)" and adopted the motto Honorem Custodite. In 1929, after the suspension of the compulsory training scheme resulted in the reduction of Australia's part-time military force and its reorganisation under the guise of the "Militia", the battalion was amalgamated with another Victorian battalion, the 7th. They remained linked until November 1936 when the two battalions were re-raised as separate units again, as part of an expansion of the Australian military in response to increasing tensions in Europe. The battalion was once again headquartered at Bendigo with companies at Castlemaine and Echuca.

=== World War II and subsequent service ===
Throughout World War II the 38th Battalion undertook garrison duties in Australia before being disbanded on 22 August 1944 to provide men for other Militia battalions. In 1948, following the completion of the demobilisation process, the Citizens Military Force was re-formed, and the battalion was reconstituted as the "38th Battalion (Northern Victoria Regiment)". Initially, the battalion recruited from Bendigo, Castlemaine, Kyneton, Echuca and Shepparton, but in 1952 after the national service scheme was enacted, the battalion was split to help form the 59th Battalion (The Hume Regiment), and subsequently lost its companies at Shepparton and Echuca. In 1953, the battalion adopted Sussex by the Sea as its regimental march and in 1955 an alliance with the South Staffordshire Regiment was approved. In 1960, following the adoption of the Pentropic divisional establishment, the 38th Battalion was combined with the 59th and the 8th/7th Battalion (The North Western Victorian Regiment), to form the 2nd Battalion, The Royal Victoria Regiment, providing two companies: 'C' and 'D'. The 38th Battalion's honours and traditions are now perpetuated by the 8th/7th Battalion, Royal Victoria Regiment.

== Battle honours ==
The 38th Battalion received the following battle and theatre honours:

- Boer War: South Africa 1899–1902 (inherited);
- World War I: Messines, 1917; Ypres, 1917; Polygon Wood; Broodseinde; Poelcappelle; Passchendaele; Somme, 1918; Ancre, 1918; Amiens; Albert, 1918; Mont St. Quentin; Hindenburg Line; St. Quentin Canal; and France and Flanders, 1916–18.

== Commanding officers ==
The following officers commanded the 38th Battalion during World War I:

- Lieutenant Colonel Charles Herbert Davis;
- Lieutenant Colonel Geoffrey Hurry.
