= Royal Victoria Regiment =

The Royal Victoria Regiment
- Cap badge of the Royal Victoria Regiment
- Active: 1960–present
- Country: Australia
- Branch: Army
- Type: Special Operations Capable General Infantry
- Role: Direct-Action Light Infantry
- Size: Two battalions
- Part of: Royal Australian Infantry Corps
- Garrison/HQ: 5th/6th Battalion - Hawthorn; 8th/7th Battalion - Ballarat
- Motto: "Semper Paratus" (Always Ready)
- March: 5th/6th Battalion - Cock o' the North; Slow: "Garb of Auld Gaul"; 8th/7th Battalion - Quick: I'm Ninety Five; Slow: Men of Harlech

Commanders
- Representative Colonel: The Governor of Victoria (currently Margaret Gardner AC)

Insignia
- Unit colour patch
- Tartan: Gordon
- Abbreviation: RVR

The Royal Victoria Regiment (RVR) is a special operations capable reserve Line Infantry Regiment within the Australian Defence Force's Royal Australian Infantry Corps. The RVR consists of two Battalions, the 5th/6th Battalion and the 8th/7th Battalion.

RVR combatants specialise in modern urban, desert, and jungle warfare. Combatants within the RVR are able to complete modules to specialise in:

- Marksmanship (sniping)
- Reconnaissance
- Human Intelligence
- Airborne insertion
- Military Self-Defence
- Offensive and Defensive driving
- Demolition explosives

The Royal Victoria Regiment (RVR) is not part of Special Operations Command (SOCOMD); however, it is a line infantry special operations capable regiment with personnel and capabilities that support specialist and special operations when required.

The 1st Commamdo Regiment's 2nd Commando Company draws its members from the Royal Victoria Regiment. This is most often by lateral transfer.

== History ==
In the late 1950s, it was determined to consolidate all Army state infantry regiment nto one regiment per state. With this move, several regimental histories ended and a new chapter in the history of Victorian volunteer military forces begun. The Royal Victoria Regiment was formed on 1 uly 1960. It inherits and embodies the traditions of the infantry in Victoria from the earliest units formed since 1854.

Throstory, several battalions and one independent company have served in it:

- 1st Battalion, Royal Victoria Regiment
- 2nd Battalion, Royal Victoria Regiment
- 3rd Battalion, Royal Victoria Regiment
- 5th Battalion, Royal Victoria Regiment
- 5th/6th Battalion, Royal Victoria Regiment
- 6th Battalion, Royal Victoria Regiment
- 8th/7th Battalion, Royal Victoria Regiment
- 22nd Battalion, Royal Victoria Regiment
- 1st Independent Rifle Company

=== 1960 - Formation of the Regiment ===
The Regiment was a result of the amalgamation of all the Citizen Military Forces infantry battalions in Victoria. The regiment was formed in 1960 as the Victoria Regiment as part of the reorganisation of the Australian Army by the amalgamation of the six existing infantry battalions (each in their respective regiments) in Victoria:

- 5th Battalion, Victorian Scottish Regiment
- 6th Battalion, Royal Melbourne Regiment
- 58th/32nd Battalion, Essendon Rifles
- 8th/7th Battalion, North Western Victorian Regiment
- 38th Battalion, The Northern Victorian Regiment
- 59th Battalion, Hume Regiment

=== 1960–1965 – The Pentropic experiment ===
A re-assessment of optimal fighting strengths and structure resulted in the Australian Army adopting a Pentropic organisation for its battalions in 1960. All of the Victorian CMF Infantry units were affected by this and two units were created to replace the six older ones. 1 RVR comprised the former 5th, 6th and 58th/32nd Battalions. 2 RVR comprised the 8th/7th, 38th and the 59th.

The pentropic arrangement comprised five rifle companies, a support company, an administration company and a command element. For 1 RVR the break up of the Sub-units was as follows:

- A Company (The Scottish Coy);
- B Company (The Merri Coy);
- C Company (The Melbourne Coy) from the 6th Battalion;
- D Company (The Essendon Coy);
- E Company (The Footscray Coy) from the 58th/32nd Battalion; and
- Support Company was established from the 5th Battalion.

=== 1965–1982 – A period of expansion ===
The pentropic arrangement was found to be generally unsuitable for use within the Australian Army and by 1965, alternatives had been studied and selected. On the 3 May 1965 both 1 RVR and 2 RVR were again split to form the following five units:

- 1st Battalion, The Royal Victoria Regiment (Melbourne Area),
- 2nd Battalion, The Royal Victoria Regiment (Country Areas),
- 5th Battalion, The Royal Victoria Regiment (Melbourne Area),
- 6th Battalion, The Royal Victoria Regiment (Melbourne Area), and
- 1st Independent Rifle Company (Mildura).

When National service ended in 1960 CMF units were again eroded, as they became completely voluntary units. However, National Service was again introduced in 1965, offering six years voluntary service in the CMF or two years full-time service, subject to being balloted by birth date, enabling all of the metropolitan units to remain at good manning levels. This scheme was abolished in 1973, however, and the Government commissioned a review into the training and organisation of the CMF. One result from this was that the CMF became known as the Australian Army Reserve or as it is more widely known: The Army Reserve.

1 RVR: The creation of 1 RVR essentially replaced 58th Battalion as the third metropolitan battalion. As with its predecessor, it was concentrated in the western and north-western parts of Melbourne. In 1975, 1 RVR absorbed both the 5 & 6 RVR due to all units being well below strength. This caused disruption to many members and was due at least in part to the fallout from the Australian involvement in Vietnam and the generally uninterested public view of the military following that unpopular conflict. With changes to its conditions of service, the number of people in the Army Reserve began to drop significantly. On the 14 November 1987, 1 RVR was absorbed into 5/6 RVR. The colours of 1 RVR were laid up on 25 April 1988 and remain at the Essendon Town Hall.

5 RVR: 5th Battalion was again manned effectively and in its distinctive dress. However, in 1966, a directive was issued that only one company in a Battalion was allowed to wear the traditional Scottish dress, a move that was not popular. The battalion received its new colours on 19 October 1969 at Royal Melbourne Showgrounds by His Excellency the Governor General of Victoria, Major General Sir Rohan Delacombe, KCMG, KBE, CB, DSO, KStJ. The Vietnam War saw the general community lose enthusiasm for the military, and the strength of all of the Battalions fell accordingly. The end of the involvement in Vietnam, and the end of National Service, severely affected the 5th Battalion. By 1975 the situation precipitated the amalgamation of all of the Victorian Battalions. 5 RVR's Colours were laid up once more although it would not be long before they would represent another unit.

6 RVR: The 6th Battalion once again took over its old stamping grounds with the end of the pentropic arrangements. As with 2 RVR and 5 RVR, 6 RVR was presented with new colours on 19 October 1969 at the Royal Melbourne Showgrounds. Due to community disinterest of Defence issues and the abolition of National Service, 6 RVR was amalgamated with the 5 RVR into 1 RVR in 1975. 6 RVR's Colours were laid up.

3 RVR: In 1973, in an era of declined interest in the Army Reserve, the four Victoria State infantry battalions and the independent rifle company were formed into one battalion for a major exercise and named 3 RVR. LTCOL Barry Ingram AM RFD ED was Commanding Officer. An unprecedented amount of resources were deployed to support 3RVR during its brief existence. This even included support from the RAAF.

=== 1980s ===
On 17 August 1982 a new Melbourne battalion was created: 5th/6th Battalion, The Royal Victoria Regiment. 5/6 RVR adopted the traditions of both The Victorian Scottish Regiment and the Royal Melbourne Regiment and recovered both sets of Colours to reflect this. The battalion also maintained its previous allegiances with The Gordon Highlanders and their extended affiliates, The Royal Regiment of Fusiliers and 6th Battalion, The Royal New Zealand Infantry Regiment. The amalgamation also involved combining some aspects of both units. A Pipes and Drums was raised, and this is now the Regimental Band. On 14 November 1987 1 RVR was absorbed into 5/6 RVR. Also on that date 2 RVR was renamed to 8th/7th Battalion, Royal Victorian Regiment.

=== Present ===
Currently the 5th/6th Battalion recruits mainly from the areas in and around the city of Melbourne, while the 8th/7th Battalion is responsible for the wider rural areas in Victoria.

== Pipes and Drums ==
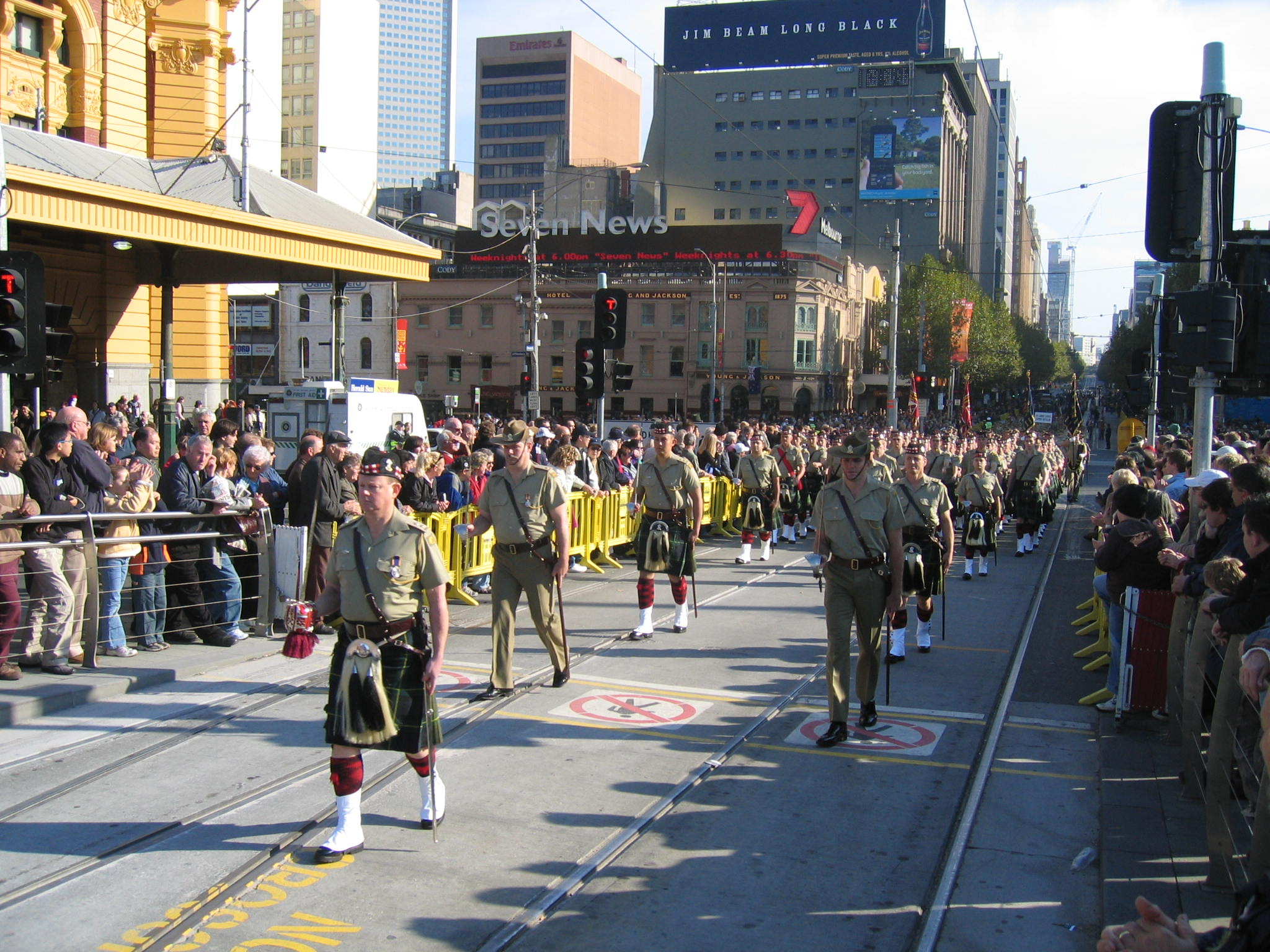
Royal Victoria Regiment marching down Swanston Street past Flinders Street Station, as part of the 2006 ANZAC Day Parade in Melbourne

Formed in 1899 as part of the Victorian Scottish Regiment, the 5/6RVR Pipes and Drums is now the band for all battalions of the Royal Victoria Regiment. Some members of 5/6 RVR Pipes and Drums are serving Army Reservists from 5th/6th Battalion, Royal Victoria Regiment, other members are derived from other Army Reserve units / parts of the Australian Defence Force, and selected guest players.

== Alliances ==
5th/6th Battalion, The Royal Victoria Regiment

- United Kingdom - The Royal Regiment of Fusiliers - via the 6th Battalion (The Royal Melbourne Regiment)
- United Kingdom - The Gordon Highlanders - via the 5th Battalion (The Victorian Scottish Regiment)
- Canada - The Lake Superior Scottish Regiment - via the 58th/32nd Battalion
- Canada - The Toronto Scottish Regiment - via Gordon Alliance
- Canada - 48th Highlanders of Canada - via Gordon Alliance
- South Africa - Cape Town Highlanders Regiment - via Gordon Alliance

8th/7th Battalion, The Royal Victoria Regiment

- United Kingdom - The Mercian Regiment
- Canada - The Royal Regiment of Canada

== See also ==
- 5/6RVR Pipes and Drums
- Australian Army
- Australian Army Reserve
- List of Australian Army Regiments

== Sources ==
- Austin, Ron (1993). Bold, Steady, Faithful: The History of the 6th Battalion, The Royal Melbourne Regiment, 1854–1993. Melbourne, Victoria: 6th Battalion Association. ISBN 0-646-15294-7.
- Grey, Jeffrey (2008). A Military History of Australia (3rd ed.). Melbourne, Victoria: Cambridge University Press. ISBN 978-0-521-69791-0.
