= 6th Battalion (Australia) =

Australian Army infantry battalion

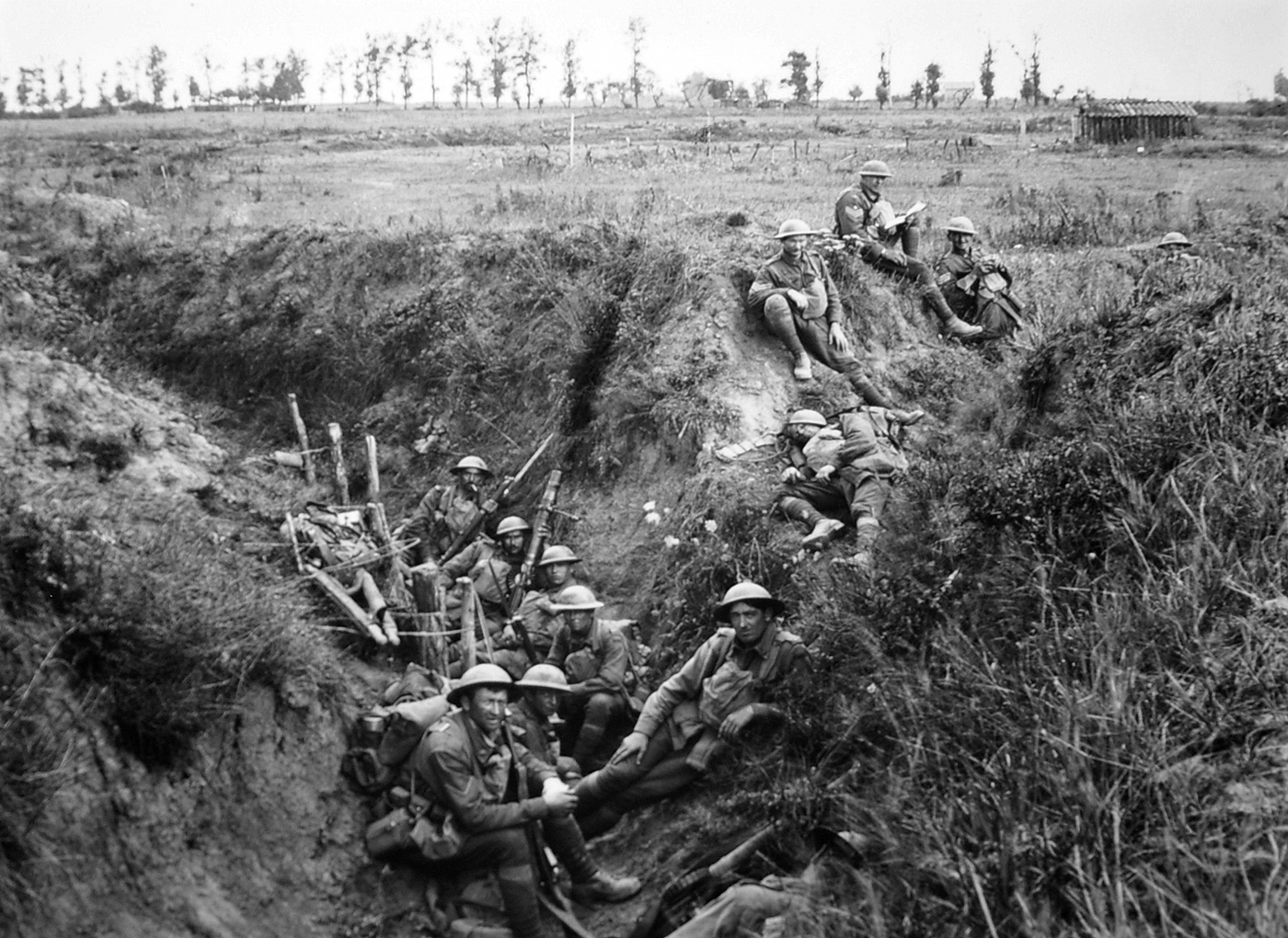
- Members of the 6th Battalion in August 1918 near Lihons during the Battle of Amiens
- Active: 1914–1919; 1921–1944; 1948–1960; 1965–1975
- Country: Australia
- Branch: Australian Army
- Type: Infantry
- Role: Line infantry
- Size: ~700–1,000 personnel (Note: During the First World War the authorised strength of Australian infantry battalions was 1,023. During the Second World War it dropped to 803 men. Upon being reformed in 1948, the battalion had a strength of 644 men on its books.)
- Part of: Australian 2nd Brigade
- Motto: Semper Paratus (Always Ready)
- Colours: Purple over red
- March: Waltzing Matilda
- Engagements: First World War: Gallipoli campaign; Western Front

Commanders
- Notable commanders: Gordon Bennett (1915–1916); Thomas White (1926–1931)

Insignia
- Unit colour patch

The 6th Battalion was an infantry battalion of the Australian Army. Originally formed in 1914 for service during the First World War, the battalion fought at Gallipoli and on the Western Front. The battalion was disbanded in 1919 but was re-raised in 1921 as part of the Citizens Force, and adopted the title of "Royal Melbourne Regiment" in 1935. The battalion did not serve overseas during the Second World War and was eventually disbanded in 1944. It was re-raised in 1948 and remained in existence until 1960 when it was absorbed into the Royal Victoria Regiment. Today its honours and traditions are maintained by the 5th/6th Battalion, Royal Victoria Regiment.

== History ==
=== First World War ===
Following the outbreak of the First World War, the decision was made to raise an all volunteer force outside of the existing Citizens Force units for overseas service known as the Australian Imperial Force (AIF). The 6th Battalion was completely recruited from Victoria, drawing from Melbourne and the surrounding suburbs to the north where four Citizens Force battalions—the 55th, 56th, 63rd and 64th Infantry—were headquartered. Raising was complete within a fortnight of the outbreak of the war in August 1914 and less than two months later the battalion embarked for overseas on the troop transport Hororata, forming part of the 2nd Brigade, 1st Division.

The battalion arrived in Egypt on 2 December 1914. After a period of training it took part in the Landing at Anzac Cove on 25 April 1915, where it went ashore as part of the second wave. Shortly after the landing the 2nd Brigade was transferred from Anzac Cove to Cape Helles to assist in the attack on Krithia. During the unsuccessful attack, the 6th Battalion suffered heavy casualties, losing 133 men killed or died of wounds. Its commanding officer Walter McNicoll was badly wounded in the abdomen and invalided home. Afterwards, they returned to Anzac Cove, arriving there on 17 May, to take part in defending the beachhead that had been established. In August, when the Allies attempted a break out, the battalion took part in the attack on Lone Pine. In September they were withdrawn for a period of rest to Lemnos. They returned in November and resumed defensive duties. By that time, due to the failure of August Offensive, the campaign evolved into a stalemate. They remained in the line December, when the Allies carried out a successful evacuation. During the campaign they lost 22 officers and 398 other ranks killed.

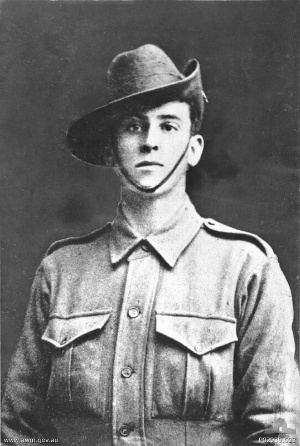
Frederick Birks, the 6th Battalion's sole Victoria Cross recipient, c. 1916

After the withdrawal from Gallipoli, the battalion returned to Egypt where they received reinforcements and carried out defensive duties. During this time the AIF was reorganised and expanded as fresh divisions were raised. In order to spread experience across the new units, the existing units were split up and the 6th Battalion provided half its experienced officers and non-commissioned officers (NCOs) to the 58th Battalion. In March 1916, it sailed to France and deployed to the Somme, where it was sent to a quiet sector near Fleurbaix. Its first combat came on 12 June when the battalion launched a trench raid on the Germans opposite their position. Their first major action in France came later, however, at Pozières in July 1916, during which time they lost 102 men killed. Later the battalion fought at Ypres, in Belgium, before returning to the Somme in winter, during which time they undertook defensive duties as well as patrols into no man's land. After this the battalion took part in the Second Battle of Bullecourt, before taking part in the Battle of Menin Road in September 1917, when Lieutenant Frederick Birks earned the 6th Battalion's only Victoria Cross.

In March and April 1918, the battalion took part in the defensive actions in response to the German spring offensive, before subsequently taking part in the Allied Hundred Days Offensive, launched near Amiens on 8 August 1918. The 6th Battalion joined the advance the following day, striking out from Villers-Bretonneux and taking part in the capture of Lihons. The battalion continued operations to late September 1918, taking part in the advance towards Herleville, but was then withdrawn from the line for rest and reorganisation and did not see any further combat. In November, the members of the battalion began being repatriated back to Australia as the demobilisation process began. The process was undertaken gradually based upon length of service and as the battalion's numbers began to dwindle it was amalgamated with the 7th Battalion in March 1919. Later, this battalion was also amalgamated with the 5th and 8th Battalions, to form the 2nd Brigade Battalion.

During the war the 6th Battalion lost 1,066 killed and 2,017 wounded. Members of the battalion received the following decorations: one Victoria Cross, one Companion of the Order of St Michael and St George, five Distinguished Service Orders with one Bar, 31 Military Crosses with two Bars, 34 Distinguished Conduct Medals, 127 Military Medals with nine Bars, nine Meritorious Service Medals, 48 Mentions in Despatches and 13 foreign awards. (Note: These foreign awards included five French Croix de Guerre, four Belgian Croix de Guerre or Oorlogskruis, one Medaille d'Honneur and one Gold Medal (Serbia).)

=== Inter-war years ===
In 1921, the decision was made to perpetuate the numerical designations and battle honours of the AIF by re-raising the AIF units as part of the Citizens Force. This was done by reorganising the existing Citizens Forces units so that they would adopt the identity of the AIF units that had been recruited within their regions and in which many of the pre-war citizen soldiers had served. This was designed so as to maintain the regional identity of the Citizens Forces units, as well as the honours and traditions of the AIF units. In this time the 6th Battalion was re-raised from personnel drawn from six existing units: all of the 2nd Battalion, 6th Infantry Regiment; as well as part of the 29th Light Horse Regiment; the 2nd Battalion, 46th Infantry Regiment; the 2nd Battalion, 60th Infantry Regiment; the 5th Battalion, 5th Infantry Regiment and the 5th Battalion, 21st Infantry Regiment. Through these units, the battalion gained a complex lineage, including that of the 64th Infantry, a unit that could trace its lineage back to 1854 and claimed to be the oldest infantry unit in Australia.

Initially attached to the 2nd Infantry Brigade, 4th Division, in 1927, when territorial titles were adopted by the Army, the battalion adopted the title of 6th Battalion, City of Melbourne Regiment. It also adopted the motto Semper Parartus at this time. In 1929, following the election of the Scullin Labor government, the compulsory training scheme was abolished and in its place a new system was introduced whereby the Citizens Forces would be maintained on a part-time, voluntary basis only. It was also renamed the "Militia" at this time. The decision to suspend compulsory training, coupled with the economic downturn of the Great Depression meant that the manpower of many Militia units dropped considerably and as a result the decision was made to amalgamate a number of units. Nevertheless, the 6th Battalion was not affected by this decision and in 1931 it formed an alliance with the Royal Fusiliers. In 1935, the battalion was re-designated as the "Royal Melbourne Regiment". This title was officially approved on King George V's jubilee and was a unique honour, as the battalion was at the time the only Australian infantry unit to carry the Royal prefix. (Note: In 1936 the New South Wales Lancers and all the units of the artillery gained this honour also.)

=== Second World War ===
At the outset of the Second World War, due to the provisions of the Defence Act (1903) which prohibited sending the Militia to fight outside of Australian territory, (Note: This stipulation also applied to the 2,800 strong Permanent Military Force. Of the 32 Militia battalions that saw active service during the war, all but three were given AIF status. Essentially this meant that as more than 65 per cent of their wartime establishment had volunteered for service overseas, the battalion could be sent anywhere, including outside of Australian territory. The 6th Battalion was one of the 29 battalions to receive this status.) The decision was made to raise an all volunteer force to serve overseas—initial operations were conceived to be likely in the Middle East, France and later possibly England—while it was decided that the Militia would be used to defend the Australian mainland and to improve Australia's overall level of readiness through the reinstitution of compulsory military service and extended periods of continuous periods of training. During this time the 6th Battalion was called up for a number of periods of continuous service in order to bolster their readiness and undertook garrison duties in Australia. In 1944, however, the decision was made to disband the unit, as the Australian government sought to reallocate resources to the economy and began the demobilisation process early. Later, in January 1945, the battalion's parent unit, the 2nd Brigade was also disbanded.

=== Post Second World War ===
In 1948, with the completion of the demobilisation process, the Citizens Force was re-raised as the Citizens Military Force (CMF), which was established on a restricted establishment of two divisions. As a part of this force, it was announced on 1 May 1948 that the 6th Battalion, Royal Melbourne Regiment would be re-raised. Two companies were formed in Melbourne along with battalion headquarters, while depots were located at Carlton and Preston. It was also decided that the battalion would perpetuate the battle honours of the 2/6th Battalion, which had fought in North Africa, Greece and New Guinea during the war. Waltzing Matilda was approved as the battalion's regimental march in 1953.

In mid-1960, the Australian Army adopted the Pentropic divisional structure, which was based on the establishment of five-company battalions. The result of this was a reduction in the number of CMF units, many of which were merged to form new units on the Pentropic establishment. (Note: Seven artillery regiments were disbanded from an original total of 17, while 31 infantry battalions were reduced to 17.) At the same time, it was decided to amalgamate the old local and regional regiments that had existed into six new multi-battalion state-based regiments, such as the Royal Victoria Regiment. As a result of these changes, in July the 6th Battalion was merged with the 5th Battalion and the 58th/32nd Battalion to form the 1st Battalion, Royal Victoria Regiment (1 RVR); within this organisation the 6th Battalion's identity was maintained by 'C' (Melbourne) Company. Prior to this, in March, the battalion had received the Freedom of the City from the City of Melbourne.

In 1965, the Pentropic system was abandoned and a further re-organisation of the CMF was undertaken as existing battalions were reduced and additional battalions were raised in the more populous areas, namely in Queensland, Victoria and New South Wales. At the same time, the concerns about the regional identity of these units were addressed by reintroducing the old numerical designations. As a result, the large Pentropic battalions were split up once again and the 6th Battalion once again was raised as a full battalion, known as the 6th Battalion, Royal Victoria Regiment. In July 1975, due to declining troop numbers further reorganisation resulted in the amalgamation of the 5th and 6th Battalions once more, albeit under the guise of the 1st Battalion, Royal Victoria Regiment (1 RVR). This lasted until August 1982 when due to concerns about the strategic situation following the Russian invasion of Afghanistan, the Australian government announced the expansion of the CMF and decided to raise another battalion in Victoria. This battalion was the 5th/6th Battalion, Royal Victoria Regiment (5/6 RVR) and by mid-1981, 1 RVR had reached peak strength and the following year the battalion was split to form the new 5/6 RVR, a unit which remains in existence today and maintains the battle honours and traditions of its predecessor AIF and Militia units.

== Alliances ==
- United Kingdom – Royal Fusiliers.

== Battle honours ==
The 6th Battalion was awarded the following battle honours:

- Second Boer War: South Africa 1899–1902. (Note: Inherited from the 64th Infantry Regiment, which it bore for the 1st Battalion, Militia Infantry Brigade.)
- First World War: Somme 1916–18, Pozières, Bullecourt, Ypres 1917, Menin Road, Polygon Wood, Broodseinde, Poelcappelle, Passchendaele, Lys, Hazebrouck, Amiens, Albert 1918, Hindenburg Line, Epehy, France and Flanders 1916–18, Helles, Krithia, ANZAC, Landing at ANZAC, Defence at ANZAC, Suvla, Sari Bair, Gallipoli 1915, Egypt 1915–16.
- Second World War: North Africa, Bardia 1941, Capture of Tobruk, Greece 1941, South-West Pacific 1942–45, Wau, Lababia Ridge, Bobdubi II, Mubo II, Komiatum, Liberation of Australian New Guinea, Maprik, Yamil–Ulupu, Kaboibus–Kiarivu. (Note: These honours were earned by the 2/6th Battalion and were awarded to the 6th Battalion in 1948 in order to perpetuate them.)

== Sources ==
- Austin, Ron (1993). Bold, Steady, Faithful: The History of the 6th Battalion, The Royal Melbourne Regiment, 1854–1993. Melbourne, Victoria: 6th Battalion Association. ISBN 0-646-15294-7.
- Festberg, Alfred (1972). The Lineage of the Australian Army. Melbourne, Victoria: Allara Publishing. ISBN 978-0-85887-024-6.
- Grey, Jeffrey (2008). A Military History of Australia (3rd ed.). Melbourne, Victoria: Cambridge University Press. ISBN 978-0-521-69791-0.
- Johnston, Mark (2007). The Australian Army in World War II. Botley, Oxford: Osprey Publishing. ISBN 978-1-84603-123-6.
- Keogh, Eustace (1965). South West Pacific 1941–45. Melbourne, Victoria: Grayflower Publications. OCLC 7185705.
- Kuring, Ian (2004). Redcoats to Cams: A History of Australian Infantry 1788–2001. Loftus, New South Wales: Australian Military History Publications. ISBN 1-876439-99-8.
- Long, Gavin (1963). The Final Campaigns. Australia in the War of 1939–1945. Canberra, Australian Capital Territory: Australian War Memorial. OCLC 1297619.
- Palazzo, Albert (2001). The Australian Army: A History of Its Organisation 1901–2001. South Melbourne, Victoria: Oxford University Press. ISBN 0-19-551507-2.
- Shaw, Peter (2010). "The Evolution of the Infantry State Regiment System in the Army Reserve". Sabretache. LI (4 (December)). Garran, Australian Capital Territory: Military Historical Society of Australia: 5–12. ISSN 0048-8933.
- Wilcox, Craig (1998). For Hearths and Homes: Citizen Soldiering in Australia 1854–1945. St Leonards, New South Wales: Allen & Unwin. ISBN 1-86448-700-3.
