= 7th Battalion (Australia) =

Infantry battalion of the Australian Army

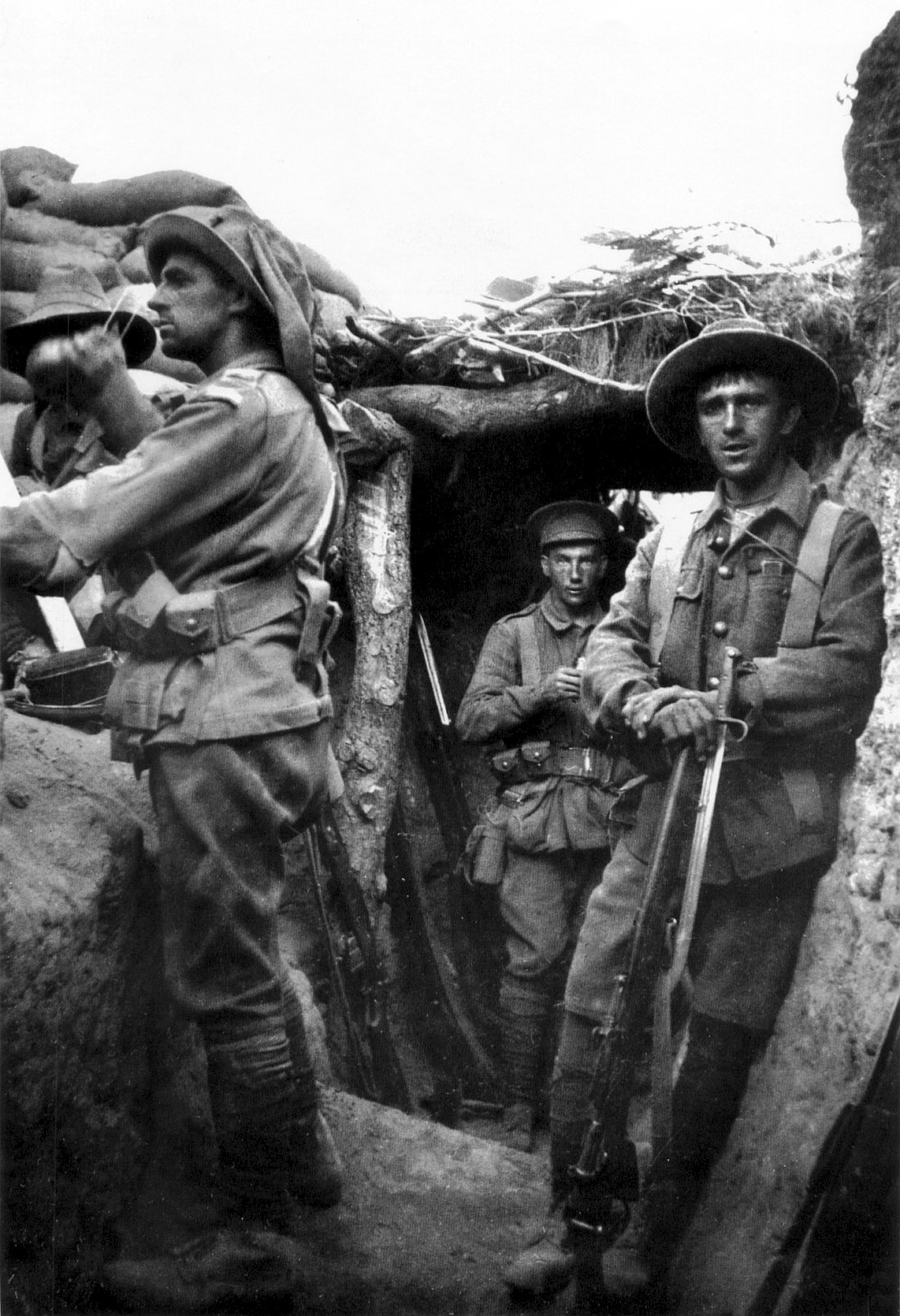
- Members of the 7th Battalion in a trench at Lone Pine, 6 August 1915
- Active: 1914–1919; 1921–1929; 1936–1946
- Country: Australia
- Branch: Australian Army
- Type: Infantry
- Size: 800–1,000 men (Note: During the First World War the standard size of an Australian infantry battalion was 1,023 men. Later, during the Second World War it was between 800 and 900 men.)
- Part of: 2nd Brigade, 1st Division (First World War); 23rd Brigade (Second World War)
- Motto: Cede Nullis (Submit to None)
- Colours: Brown over red
- Engagements: First World War: Gallipoli campaign; Western Front; Second World War: Bougainville campaign
- Website: 7th Battalion (1939–45) Association

Commanders
- Notable commanders: Harold Elliott; Carl Jess

Insignia
- Unit colour patch

The 7th Battalion was an infantry battalion of the Australian Army. Raised in 1914 as part of the Australian Imperial Force during the First World War, the battalion was completely recruited from the state of Victoria and formed the 2nd Brigade, 1st Division. The battalion served during the Gallipoli campaign where it had the distinction of having four of its members awarded the Victoria Cross. In 1916, it was transferred to Europe, fighting in the trenches along the Western Front for the next two and a half years.

Although disbanded in 1919 following the end of hostilities, it was re-raised in 1921 in the Citizens Force (later known as the Militia) as a part-time infantry battalion based in Victoria. However, due to lack of funding following the Great Depression and a shortage of manpower following the suspension of the compulsory training scheme in 1929, the battalion was amalgamated with the 38th Battalion as the 7th/38th Battalion, although it was delinked again in 1936 when the Army was expanded due to rising tensions in Europe.

During the Second World War, the 7th Battalion served primarily in a garrison role, firstly being used to defend the Australian mainland before deploying late in the war to take part in the Bougainville campaign in 1944–1945. On Bougainville, as part of the 23rd Brigade, they took part in the fighting in the central sector of the island in the last months of the war. Following the end of hostilities, the battalion was once again used in the garrison role before being returned to Australia and disbanding in early 1946.

In 1948, the battalion was re-raised as an amalgamated unit with the 8th Battalion when the Citizens Military Force was reformed. Today, it exists as the 8th/7th Battalion, Royal Victoria Regiment.

== History ==
=== First World War ===
==== Formation ====
Following the outbreak of the First World War, the Australian government decided to raise an all volunteer force for overseas service due to the provisions of the Defence Act (1903) which precluded sending the Militia outside of Australian territory to fight. While this force would draw from the military forces that already existed—the part-time Citizens Force and the Permanent Military Force—it would be largely be made up from recruits not currently serving. Known as the Australian Imperial Force (AIF), initially it was to consist of 20,000 men, comprising one infantry division and a light horse brigade. Recruitment for the first intake began on 10 August 1914, and the 7th Battalion was among the first units raised, forming less than a fortnight after the declaration of war.

Under the command of Lieutenant Colonel Harold Elliott, the battalion was brigaded with the 5th, 6th and 8th Battalions to form the 2nd Brigade under Brigadier James Whiteside McCay. Elliott took personal control over the recruitment process, selecting only those officers that he had known from his service in the Citizens Forces as his company commanders, who he in turn entrusted with choosing their own subordinates. Recruitment was conducted over a period of three weeks and by the end of the period the process had been so successful that the battalion was over establishment. Initially, the battalion was organised into eight companies, designated 'A' to 'H', while recruitment and initial training was undertaken at Broadmeadows, however, this was later reduced to the new British standard four companies of double the size, designated 'A' to 'D'.

==== Gallipoli ====
In September the battalion marched through the city of Melbourne and a fortnight later they embarked upon HMT Hororata bound for the Middle East. They arrived in Egypt on 2 December 1914 after which they undertook further training before being called to undertake defensive duties along the Suez Canal following the failed Turkish First Suez Offensive in February 1915. However the battalion did not take part in direct combat, and during this time a number of its non-commissioned officers were allowed to apply for commissions in British Army units. (Note: In total, during the course of the war, 13 men from the 7th Battalion went on to accept commissions in British and Indian Army units.)

In early April the battalion was moved to Alexandria and from there on to Lemnos Island. On the morning of 25 April 1915, the battalion took part in the Landing at Anzac Cove, coming ashore as part of the second wave. Over the course of the first week the battalion was involved in establishing the beachhead and suffered heavily, losing five officers and 179 men killed or died of wounds. This was higher than any other subsequent battle that the battalion fought during the war. On 29 April, the 2nd Brigade was relieved by the 12th (Deal) Battalion and in early May the battalion was able to reorganise itself after its baptism of fire. The respite did not last long, however, for only ten days after the landing at Anzac Cove, the 2nd Brigade was transferred to Cape Helles in order to take part in an attack on Krithia on 8 May 1915. The attack was a very costly failure, with the battalion losing a further six officers and 87 men killed. Nevertheless, they were involved in what is believed to be the first brigade-level attack conducted by an Australian force against an entrenched enemy and the attack earned the Victorians many plaudits.

After the attack the battalion was given a weeks rest at Cape Helles, where it received a number of reinforcements before being sent back to the lodgement at Anzac Cove, where a stalemate situation had developed. In an effort to break this deadlock, the Allies launched an offensive in August and the battalion took part in the Battle of Lone Pine. After taking over positions that had been captured by the 1st Brigade, the battalion defended the trenches against repeated Turkish counterattacks and, in the process, four of its members performed acts of gallantry that later led to them receiving the Victoria Cross (VC), the nation's highest military decoration. These men were: Corporal Alexander Stewart Burton, Corporal William Dunstan, Lieutenant William John Symons and Lieutenant Frederick Harold Tubb. Sergeant Ball and Corporal H. Webb received the Distinguished Conduct Medal (DCM). According to Ron Austin, during this fighting, the 7th Battalion lost 87 men killed; Arthur Dean and Eric Gutteridge give the total casualties as twelve out of fourteen officers and 680 Other Ranks.

Despite the battalion's success in holding the trenches at Lone Pine, the August Offensive failed to break the deadlock as setbacks elsewhere resulted in continued stalemate and for the rest of the campaign the fighting was relatively static. Finally, in December the decision was made to evacuate the Allied force from the peninsula. During the evacuation, two of the battalion's soldiers, William Scurry and Alfred 'Buntie' Lawrence played a significant part through their invention of a self-firing rifle, which assisted in making the Turks believe that there were still men manning the trenches even as they were being evacuated.

==== Western Front ====
After Gallipoli the 7th Battalion was withdrawn to Egypt, where the AIF underwent a period of reorganisation and expansion prior to being transferred to Europe. The 7th Battalion was split to provide a cadre for the 59th Battalion which was being raised as part of the doubling of the Australian forces. In March 1916, they sailed to France where for the next two and half years they would take part in the fighting in the trenches along the Western Front. Upon arrival, the battalion was sent to the Somme, where its first major action came in July during the Battle of Pozières. Throughout July and into August, the battalion was committed to the fighting twice, losing 55 men killed in the first battle and another 83 in the second.

In late August, the 7th Battalion, with a frontage equal to just over half its authorised strength, was transferred to Ypres, in Belgium, where they manned trenches near the Ypres–Commines canal. During this time they were not involved in any major attacks, however, each night they sent patrols out into no man's land and established listening posts to gather intelligence. On 30 September, the 7th Battalion, along with its sister battalion, the 8th Battalion, mounted a raid on the German line at Hollebeke with a force roughly equivalent to two platoons. The raid was a great success, with the Australians overwhelming the defenders and capturing a section of the German line and killing up to 13 Germans, before withdrawing.

In October, the battalion returned to the Somme where they spent the winter months manning trenches and training. In early 1917, precipitated by the loss of the high ground around Pozières, the Germans withdrew back to the Hindenburg Line in order to shorten their defensive line and to straighten a salient that had developed. In February, the German withdrawal was discovered and the Allies, finding an open battlefield for the first time since 1914 and believing that the German Army was suffering from limited manpower, began an advance to follow them up. On the night of 26/27 February, the 7th Battalion launched what was meant to be a trench raid, but turned into an open advance, seeing them extend their lines by 2.5 kilometres (1.6 mi). The Allied advance, however, was brief as the Germans had established themselves in strength, and was halted before the Australians reached Bullecourt.

In May the battalion was withdrawn from the front line for re-organisation and training. It did not return until the Third Battle of Ypres in September and October 1917, when they were committed to the fighting first at Menin Road. The 7th Battalion had 57 men killed in this phase, and then later at Broodseinde another 98 were killed. Following these battles, the 7th Battalion was withdrawn from the front line once more in December. In March 1918, however, following the start of the German spring offensive, the battalion was called back to help stem the tide of the German advance. As the German offensive ran out of momentum, the battalion kept up the pressure on the German line through a series of peaceful penetrations, before subsequently taking part in the Allied Hundred Days Offensive, which was launched near Amiens on 8 August 1918. As a part of this offensive, the battalion fought major actions at Lihons on 9–11 August where they captured a number of German mortars and Herleville Woods on 23 August. They continued operations until late September 1918 when they were withdrawn with a strength of just 410 men and it was out of the line when the armistice came into effect in November. Shortly afterwards the demobilisation process began and as the battalion's numbers fell as men were repatriated back to Australia, it was amalgamated with 6th Battalion. This battalion was amalgamated with another, formed from the 5th and 8th Battalions, to form the 2nd Brigade Battalion.

Throughout their service during the war, the battalion suffered 1,045 killed and 2,076 wounded. Members of the battalion received the following decorations: four VCs, one Companion of the Order of St Michael and St George (CMG), two Distinguished Service Orders (DSOs), 20 Military Crosses (MCs) with two Bars, 31 Distinguished Conduct Medals (DCMs) with one Bar, 100 Military Medals (MMs) with five Bars, six Meritorious Service Medals (MSMs), 37 Mentions in Despatches (MIDs) and six foreign awards. (Note: These figures differ slightly from those given by Austin who provides figures of four VCs, one CMG, 17 MCs with one bar, 23 DCMs with one bar, 100 MMs with seven bars, six MSMs, 34 MIDs, and eight foreign awards.) The battalion received a total of 26 battle honours for its service during the war.

=== Inter war years ===
In 1921, the decision was made to perpetuate the battle honours and traditions of the AIF battalions that had served during World War I by reorganising the Citizens Force along AIF lines, with previously existing part-time units adopting the numerical designations of the AIF units that had been drawn from their traditional recruitment territories. In May 1921, the 7th Battalion was reformed in regional Victoria around a headquarters in Mildura, with depots at Merbein, Wentworth and Red Cliffs. At this time, the battalion drew its personnel from the 2nd Battalion, 7th Infantry Regiment, and the 2nd Battalion, 21st Infantry Regiment. Through its link with these units, the battalion inherited the battle honour of "South Africa 1899–102". In 1927, when territorial titles were introduced into the Militia, the battalion adopted the title of the "Mount Alexander Regiment". It was also granted the motto Cede Nullius at this time.

In 1929, however, the compulsory training scheme was suspended by the newly elected Scullin Labor government. In its place a voluntary system was established and the Citizens Force renamed the "Militia". The end of compulsory training, coupled with low levels of defence spending and economic hardships brought about by the Great Depression greatly reduced the manpower available to many Militia units at this time and as a result a number of units were disbanded or amalgamated at this time. The 7th Battalion was also affected and on 1 July 1929 it was amalgamated with the 38th Battalion to form the 7th/38th Battalion. The two battalions remained linked until 9 November 1936 when, following concerns about growing tensions in Europe, it was decided to delink them in order to double the size of the Militia as the prospect of another war became apparent. In 1937, the battalion's designation was changed to the "North Murray Borderers".

=== Second World War ===
Following the outbreak of the Second World War in September 1939, the Australian government once again decided to raise an all volunteer force for service overseas as the legal restrictions on employing the Militia outside of Australia still applied. Regardless a number of Militia units attempted to join up en masse as already formed units and the 7th Battalion was one of these units. However, as they were required to remain in Australia to provide home defence in the case of war spreading to the Pacific this did not occur. In October 1939, the Militia was mobilised in stages to undertake a short period of 30 days continuous training and this was undertaken again in 1940, but for a period of 90 days instead. The compulsory training scheme was also reintroduced and the 7th Battalion's ranks were filled out with national servicemen.

Throughout 1940 and 1941 the battalion undertook a number of training camps in Victoria. In December 1941, with Japan's entry into the war following the attacks on Malaya and Pearl Harbor, the battalion was mobilised for war service and tasked with defending the Dandenong area. In 1942, however, it received orders to move north to Darwin, where it carried out garrison duties to defend the town and experienced a number air raids from Japanese aircraft. During this time also, the battalion was transferred to the 23rd Brigade. Originally the 23rd Brigade had been part of the 8th Division and made up of Second Australian Imperial Force (2nd AIF) battalions, however, after these units were captured or destroyed on Rabaul, Ambon and Timor, it had been rebuilt using Militia battalions and placed under the command of Brigadier Arnold Potts, and assigned to the 12th Division.

They remained in Darwin for 18 months before being relieved and sent back to Melbourne in April 1943. After taking leave, the 7th Battalion was sent to the Atherton Tablelands in Queensland for a period of intensive pre-deployment training in November. In 1944 the 23rd Brigade had been attached to the II Corps, which was tasked with taking over from the Americans and launching a renewed offensive on Bougainville. The 23rd Brigade was given the task of relieving the garrisons in the outer islands and the 7th Battalion was primarily responsible for Mono island, although one company was detached to Munda, arriving there in October 1944. Tasked with defending the airfield from a Japanese attack that was at best remote, some members of the battalion sought to enliven their existence by acting as crews on US Navy PT boats carrying out raids on New Britain and New Ireland.

In April 1945, after months of lobbying by Potts—who was keen to get back into action himself after having been relieved of his previous command during the Kokoda campaign—the 7th Battalion was transferred to Torokina on Bougainville Island, where the Japanese garrison was still holding out. In June they moved up the Numa Numa Trail to Pearl Ridge in the central sector of the island where they relieved the 27th Battalion. Almost immediately they began aggressive patrols in order to dominate the Japanese in their area of operations and were tasked with the capture of several key positions including Wearne's Hill, Base Point 3, Tokua and Sisivie and to establish a forward position in the Wakunai Valley. Over the course of the next three months until the end of the war, the battalion captured 25 positions and killed around 200 Japanese soldiers.

Following the end of hostilities the battalion moved to the island of Fauro to guard Japanese prisoners of war. As the demobilisation process began, members of the battalion were slowly repatriated to Australia, while others were transferred to other units for further service elsewhere. By March 1946 the last of the battalion's personnel had been returned to Australia and on 10 May 1946, the 7th Battalion was formally disbanded. During its service throughout the war the battalion lost 25 men killed or died on active service, with a further 50 men wounded. Members of the battalion received the following decorations: one DSO, one MC, one MM and 16 MIDs.

== Legacy ==
Following the completion of the demobilisation process, the Citizens Military Force was reformed in 1948, albeit on a reduced scale. At this time, the 7th Battalion was not re-raised in its own right, although an amalgamated unit known as the 8th/7th Battalion (North Western Victorian Regiment) was formed in order to perpetuate the two rural Victorian battalions. Today the honours and traditions of the 7th Battalion are maintained by the 8th/7th Battalion, Royal Victoria Regiment, an infantry battalion of the Australian Army Reserve, that was formed in 1960 as the 2nd Battalion, Royal Victoria Regiment, following the introduction of the Pentropic organisation, but which was later redesignated 8/7 RVR. The 7th Battalion's battle honours include those of the 2nd AIF's 2/7th Battalion, which were entrusted to the 7th in 1961.

== Commanding officers ==
The following is a list of officers that served as the 7th Battalion's commanding officer during the two World Wars:

First World War:

- Lieutenant Colonel Harold Elliott;
- Lieutenant Colonel Alfred Jackson;
- Lieutenant Colonel Carl Herman Jess;
- Lieutenant Colonel Ernest Edward Herrod.

Second World War:

- Lieutenant Colonel Hugh Marcell Conran;
- Lieutenant Colonel Howard Leslie Ewin Dunkley;
- Lieutenant Colonel Frederick Thomas Henry Goucher;
- Lieutenant Colonel Geoffrey Moore Norris;
- Lieutenant Colonel Rupert Markham Sadler;
- Lieutenant Colonel Peter Glynn Clifton Webster;
- Lieutenant Colonel John Alfred Wilmoth.

== Battle honours ==
The 7th Battalion received the following battle honours:

- South Africa 1899–1902. (Note: Inherited from the 4th Battalion, Militia Infantry Brigade.)
- First World War: Landing at Anzac, Defence at Anzac, Helles, Krithia, Anzac, Suvla, Sari Bair–Lone Pine, Gallipoli 1915, Egypt 1915–16, Somme 1916–18, Pozières, Bullecourt, Ypres 1917, Menin Road, Polygon Wood, Broodseinde, Poelcappelle, Passchendaele, Lys, Hazebrouck, Amiens, Albert 1918 (Chuignes), Hindenburg Line, Epehy, France and Flanders 1916–18, Suez Canal.
- Second World War: North Africa 1940–41, Bardia 1941, Capture of Tobruk, Greece 1941, Middle East 1941, Crete, Canea, 42nd Street, Withdrawal to Sphakia, South-West Pacific 1942–45, Wau, Mubo I, Bobdubi II, Komiatum, Liberation of Australian New Guinea, Maprik, Yamil–Ulupu, Kaboibus–Kiarivu. (Note: Of these, all but two – South-West Pacific 1942–45 and Liberation of Australian New Guinea – were inherited from the 2/7th Battalion in 1961.)
