= Royal Australian Infantry Corps =

Administrative corps of the Australian Army

- Badge
- Active: 23 November 1948 – present
- Country: Australia
- Branch: Army
- Type: Corps
- Role: Infantry
- Size: 1 Regular Regiment (6 battalions); 6 State Regiments (13 battalions); 3 Special Forces Regiments; 3 Regional Force Surveillance Regiments
- Mottos: Duty and Honour
- Colours: Infantry Red
- March: "Our Director"

Commanders
- Colonel of the Regiment: Brigadier M. J. Moon

The Royal Australian Infantry Corps (RA Inf) is the parent corps for all infantry regiments of the Australian Army. It was established on 14 December 1948, with its Royal Corps status being conferred by King George VI. At her coronation in 1953, Queen Elizabeth II became Colonel-in-Chief of the corps. Major components of the RA Inf include the various battalions of the Royal Australian Regiment and the six state-based Australian infantry regiments, such as the Royal New South Wales Regiment. The various Regional Force Surveillance and Special Forces units of the Army are also part of the corps. The School of Infantry (SOI) is located at Singleton, New South Wales, and forms part of the Combined Arms Training Centre.

The "Head of Corps – Infantry" is usually a Brigadier and is the Honorary Colonel of the Royal Australian Regiment.

== Role ==
The role of the Royal Australian Infantry is to seek out and close with the enemy, to kill or capture him, to seize and hold ground, to repel attack, by day or night, regardless of season, weather or terrain.

== History ==
The Australian Infantry Corps was formed on 14 December 1948.

== Organisation ==
=== Regiments ===
==== Regular Army Regiments ====
- Royal Australian Regiment
  - 1st Battalion
  - 2nd Battalion (Amphibious)
  - 3rd Battalion
  - 5th/7th Battalion
  - 6th Battalion
  - 8th/9th Battalion

==== State Regiments ====
- Royal Queensland Regiment
  - 9th Battalion
  - 25th/49th Battalion
  - 31st/42nd Battalion
- Royal New South Wales Regiment
  - 1st/19th Battalion
  - 2nd/17th Battalion
  - 4th/3rd Battalion
  - 41st Battalion
- Royal Victoria Regiment
  - 5th/6th Battalion
  - 8th/7th Battalion
- Royal South Australia Regiment
  - 10th/27th Battalion
- Royal Western Australia Regiment
  - 11th/28th Battalion
  - 16th Battalion
- Royal Tasmania Regiment
  - 12th/40th Battalion

==== Training Regiments ====
- Sydney University Regiment
- Melbourne University Regiment
- Queensland University Regiment
- Adelaide Universities Regiment
- Western Australia University Regiment
- University of New South Wales Regiment

==== Regional Force Surveillance ====
- NORFORCE
- Pilbara Regiment
- Far North Queensland Regiment
  - 51st Battalion

==== Special Forces ====
- Special Air Service Regiment
- 1st Commando Regiment
- 2nd Commando Regiment

== School of Infantry ==
Commanders of the School of Infantry

Rank	Name	Years Served
School of Musketry, Randwick 1911–1921
Major	F.B. Heritage	1911–1915
Captain	G.F.C. Shipley	1915–1917
Captain	W. MacLennan	1917
Captain	R.G.C. Prisk	1918–1919
Captain	C.F.C. Shipley	1919–1920
Lieutenant Colonel	F.B. Heritage	1920–1921
Small Arms School, Randwick 1921–1940
Major	H. Ordish	1922–1926
Major	H.C.H. Robertson	1926–1930
Lieutenant Colonel	J.J. McCall	1930–1934
Lieutenant Colonel	J.A. Chapman	1934–1938
Major	T.N. Gooch	1938–1940
Medium Machine Gun School, Randwick 1940–1942
Lieutenant Colonel	R.G. Legge	1940
Lieutenant Colonel	E.W. Latchford	1940–1941
Small Arms School, Bonegilla 1942–1945
Lieutenant Colonel	E.W. Latchford	1942–1945
School of Infantry, Puckapunyal 1944–1945
Lieutenant Colonel	R.A. Wolfe-Murray	1944–1945
Lieutenant Colonel	H.W. Hilless	1945
School of Infantry, Bonegilla 1945–1946
Lieutenant Colonel	E.W. Latchford	1945–1946
School of Infantry, Seymour 1947–1960
Lieutenant Colonel	E.W. Latchford	1947–1948
Lieutenant Colonel	D.R. Jackson	1949
Lieutenant Colonel	K.M. McKenzie	1949–1952
Lieutenant Colonel	F.G. Hassett	1952–1953
Lieutenant Colonel	J.L.A. Kelly	1953–1954
Lieutenant Colonel	N.P. Maddern	1954–1956
Major	W.F. Roberson	1956–1957
Lieutenant Colonel	G.H. Fawcett	1957–1959
Lieutenant Colonel	N.R. McLeod	1959–1960
Infantry Centre, Ingleburn 1960–1969
Lieutenant Colonel	G.O. O'Day	1960–1963
Lieutenant Colonel	D.G. Sharp	1963–1964
Lieutenant Colonel	R.S. Garland	1965–1967
Lieutenant Colonel	A.J. Milner	1967–1969
Infantry Centre, Ingleburn 1969–1973 Commandant
Colonel	A.J. Milner	1969–1971
Colonel	E.H. Smith	1971–1973
Infantry Centre, Ingleburn 1969–1973 CO/Chief Instructor
Lieutenant Colonel	R.R. Hannigan	1969–1970
Lieutenant Colonel	R.L. Burnard	1971–1972
Lieutenant Colonel	E.R. Philip	1972
Infantry Centre, Singleton 1973–1994 Commandant
Colonel	E.H. Smith	1973
Colonel	C.M. Townsend	1974–1976
Colonel	J. Essex-Clark	1976–1979
Colonel	J.P.A. Deighton	1979–1981
Colonel	A.W. Hammett	1981–1984
Colonel	P.M. McDougall	1984–1987
Colonel	P.A. Sibree	1987–1989
Colonel	P.J. Cosgrove	1989–1991
Colonel	D.J. Mead	1991–1994
Infantry Centre, Singleton 1973–1994 CO/Chief Instructor
Lieutenant Colonel	C.F. Thompson	1973–1974
Lieutenant Colonel	M.P. Blake	1975–1976
Lieutenant Colonel	R.F. Sutton	1977–1978
Lieutenant Colonel	J.H. Taylor	1979–1980
Lieutenant Colonel	R.E. Boxall	1981–1982
Lieutenant Colonel	J.D. McAloney	1982–1984
Lieutenant Colonel	D.A. Webster	1984–1986
Lieutenant Colonel	A.J. Ralph	1987–1988
Lieutenant Colonel	J.S. Murray	1988–1989
Lieutenant Colonel	R.H. Greville	1990–1991
Lieutenant Colonel	R.C. Brown	1992–1994
Infantry Centre, Singleton 1994–1999 Commandant
Colonel	R.J. Margetts	1994–1996
Colonel	D.S.M. Roche	1992–1994
Infantry Centre, Singleton 1994–1999 CO/Chief Instructor
Lieutenant Colonel	J.C. Dittmar	1994–1996
Lieutenant Colonel	G.R.C. Pike	1997–1999
Dismounted Combat Division, Singleton 2000–2001
Lieutenant Colonel	D.J. Butler	2000–2001
School of Infantry, Singleton 2001–present
Lieutenant Colonel	D.J. Butler	2001
Lieutenant Colonel	P.T. Roney	2002–2003
Lieutenant Colonel	W. Austin	2004–2005
Lieutenant Colonel	D. Franklin	2005–2007
Lieutenant Colonel	A. Egan	2008–2009
Lieutenant Colonel	A. Lowe	2010–2012
Lieutenant Colonel	M. Constable	2013–2014
Lieutenant Colonel	S. Morris	2015–2017
Lieutenant Colonel	M. Flanagan	2018–2019

== Notes ==
Preceded by Royal Australian Corps of Signals	Australian Army Order of Precedence	Succeeded by Australian Army Aviation
