= 5th/6th Battalion, Royal Victoria Regiment =

Australian Army unit

5th/6th Battalion The Royal Victoria Regiment
- 5th/6th Battalion Royal Victoria Regiment
- Active: 1854–Present
- Country: Australia
- Branch: Australian Army
- Type: Infantry
- Role: Light infantry
- Part of: 4th Brigade
- Garrison/HQ: Melbourne
- Mottos: 5th Battalion – Nemo me impune lacessit (No one shall provoke me with impunity); 6th Battalion – Semper Paratus (Always ready)
- March: Combination of "Cock O' the North" and "Waltzing Matilda"
- Battle honours: Boer War: South Africa 1899–1902. World War I: Landing at Anzac Cove, Somme 1916, Somme 1918, Bullecourt, Pozieres, Polygon Wood, Ameins, Albert 1918, Mont St Quentin, Hindenburg Line. World War II: Bardia 1941, Capture of Tobruk, El Alamein, Greece 1941, South West Pacific 1942–1945, Bobdubi II, Finisterres, Lae–Nadzab, Hari River, Borneo.

Commanders
- Current commander: Lieutenant Colonel Matthew Ford
- Notable commanders: Major General Matthew Burr

Insignia
- Unit colour patch

The 5th/6th Battalion ("5/6 RVR") is one of two battalions of the Royal Victoria Regiment, and is an infantry battalion of the Australian Army. The battalion traces its lineage back to many units that existed prior to Federation, as well as units that fought during World War I and World War II and the battalion carries the battle honours of these units as a mark of respect. Today 5/6 RVR is part of the 4th Brigade, 2nd Division and is based at various depots around Melbourne, Victoria. Recently, members from the battalion have been involved in deployments to the Middle East, East Timor, the Solomon Islands and Malaysia as part of Rifle Company Butterworth.

== Unit history ==
5th/6th Battalion, The Royal Victoria Regiment is derived from earlier Australian battalions which had drawn members from the Melbourne metropolitan area. The history of this Battalion and the events leading up to their linking and the formation of the subsequent 5th/6th Battalion, The Royal Victoria Regiment is detailed below.

=== The Regiment ===
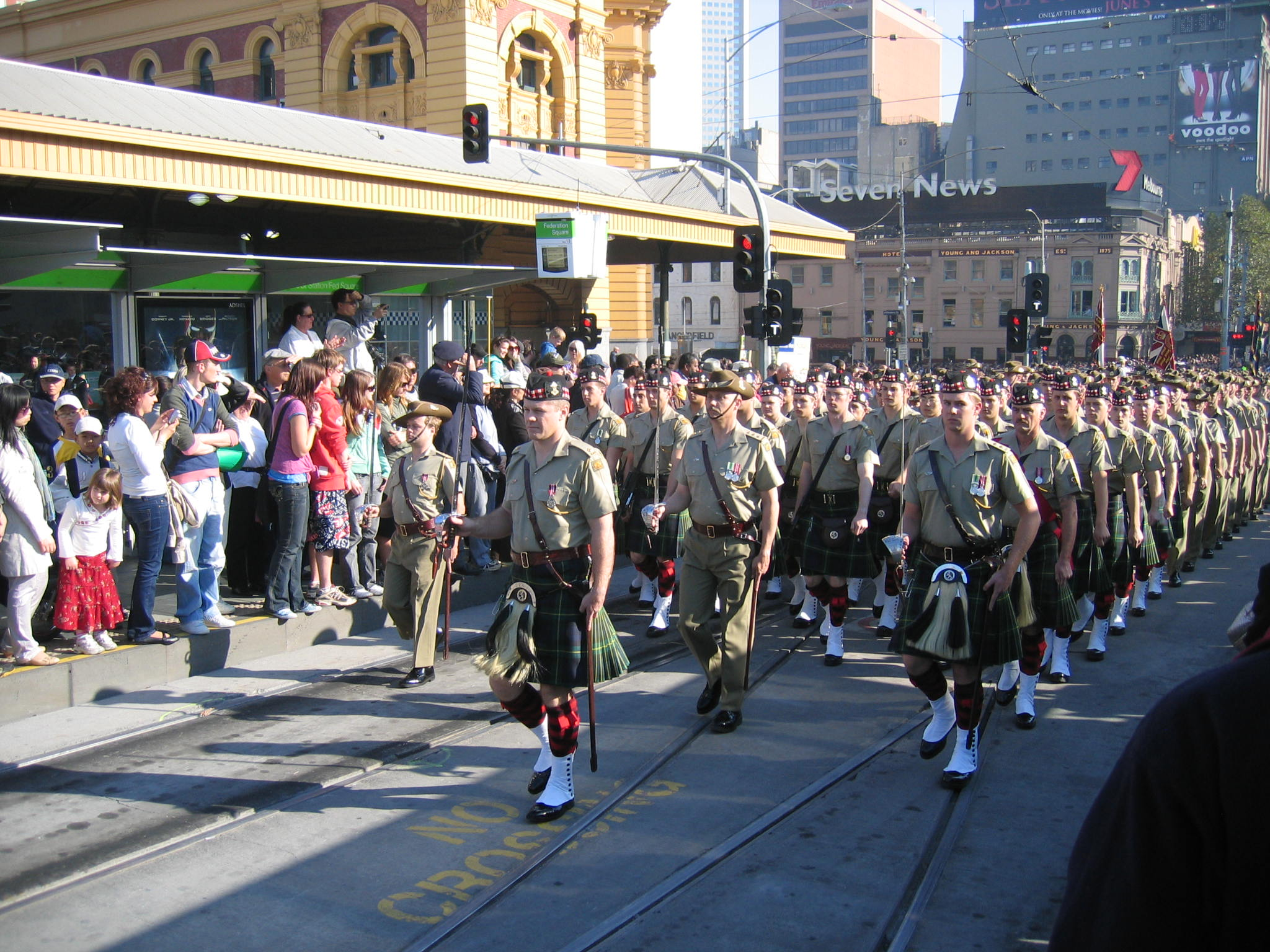
5/6 RVR marching through Melbourne on ANZAC Day 2008

In the late 1950s, it was determined to consolidate all Army state infantry regiments into one regiment per state. With this move, several regimental histories were ended and a new chapter in the history of Victorian volunteer military forces begun. The Royal Victoria Regiment was formed on 1 July 1960. It inherits and embodies the traditions of the infantry in Victoria from the earliest units formed since 1854.

A number of previously existing Melbourne metropolitan units and Victorian regional units now make up the 5th/6th Battalion, The Royal Victoria Regiment. The regional units' traditions and histories are entrusted to 8th/7th Battalion, The Royal Victoria Regiment, which is the sister unit of 5/6 RVR. Many of the 1st AIF and the 2nd AIF units were raised directly from the skeleton of militia units on the declaration of war. For this reason, The Royal Victoria Regiment can claim more battle honours than any other regiment or unit in the Australian Defence Force.

Three Victorian battalions (5th, 6th and 58th/32nd) have been merged, split and renamed several times from 1948 through to 2003. A fourth battalion was briefly formed in the early 1970s. This constant flux and turmoil has disrupted the clarity of the battalion's heritage. The various regimental families however, sustain the unit's past and a benefit of this consolidation is the breadth of its affiliations.

With World War Two over the 2nd AIF was de-mobilised more rapidly than the similar forces of any other participating nation. It was not long however, before the fear of communism prompted the expansion of Australian Forces. In 1960, the National Service scheme ceased, resulting in an immediate reduction in strength. A substantial structural change was also about to occur, for on 30 June 1960, all battalions and their members were absorbed into the new-style pentropic 1st Battalion, The Royal Victoria Regiment (RVR).

The Korean War, coupled with a perceived threat of communism to the security of the country and surrounding regions, led to the adoption of National Service. This scheme required participants to complete three months of full-time training, followed by three years service as members of Citizens Military Force (CMF) units.

==== 5th Battalion – The Victorian Scottish Regiment ====
The 5th Battalion, The Victorian Scottish Regiment (VSR) had existed prior to World War Two and was re-established on 1 April 1948, as part of the Citizen Military Forces (CMF). Just as many of the members of the pre-war VSR had helped to raise the AIF, many ex-members of the 2nd AIF returned to the colours to again raise the 5th Battalion. Battalion Headquarters was established at Hawthorn and the Companies were located at Kew, Surrey Hills, Armadale and Dandenong.

The first Commanding Officer of the new battalion was Lieutenant Colonel G.R Warfe, DSO, MC, ED. The battalion quickly undertook a variety of training and duties, providing a guard of honour on the occasion of the presentation of the Field Marshal's Baton to Sir Thomas Blamey Australia's first and as at the time of writing only active Field Marshal (the Duke of Edinburgh is also listed as a Field Marshal in the Australian Army).

The battalion colours were also recovered with great pomp and ceremony, from the Scots' Church in Melbourne. In addition, Scottish Dress was quickly approved and the VSR was soon dressed distinctively. In 1898, the VSR had originally worn a modified Gordon tartan, with the gold lines replaced by red. This was replaced by the Gordon tartan in 1930 with the approval of an alliance with the Gordon Highlanders. The battalion motto was the same as that prior to World War One: "Nemo Me Impune Lacessit". These same words are engraved at the entrance of Edinburgh Castle. Loosely translated this means "no one hurts me and gets away it with it". The battalion march was "Cock of the North", and the unit colour was gold.

The introduction of National Service in 1951 led to 5th Battalion VSR growing to be over full-strength, allowing the unit to conduct ambitious peacetime training successfully. The battalion was represented in the Coronation Contingent sent to London in 1953. In 1954 the battalion provided the Government House Ceremonial Guards during the visit of Queen Elizabeth II. In the same year, the battalion also provided troops to line the streets, with their colours, for the opening of Parliament in Canberra. The battalion was presented with new Queen's and Regimental Colours on the 12 May 1957, which are now laid up in The Scots' Church, Melbourne.

==== 6th Battalion – The Royal Melbourne Regiment ====
In May, 1948, the 6th Battalion was re-formed. 6th Battalion, The Royal Melbourne Regiment (RMR) had existed prior to the Second World War and again ex-soldiers of the 2nd AIF returned to the colours, members now of the CMF. The battalion recovered its colours, adopting the motto of "Semper Paratus" or "Always Ready". The Battalion March was "Waltzing Matilda" and the unit colour was Khaki.

The battalion was established in the same Victoria Street Training Depot that they had occupied prior to the war. Today, this depot still stands near Queen Victoria Market on the corner of Therry & Victoria Streets in Melbourne. Companies were also established at Preston and Carlton. The 6th Battalion gained an influx of members due to the effects of National Service and participated in many of the major ceremonial events that the 5th Battalion VSR was involved in. The size of the unit allowed large scale and advanced training, although when the scheme ceased, the unit suffered a reduction in size. The battalion also gained a significant honour, being granted the Freedom of Entry to the City of Melbourne, on 10 March 1960. 6th Battalion's Colours are laid up in St Paul's Cathedral Melbourne.

==== 58th/32nd Infantry Battalion – The City of Essendon Regiment ====
A third CMF Infantry Battalion was raised in the Melbourne area in 1948, being based predominantly in the Western and North-Western suburbs. Initially encompassing Footscray, and known as The West Melbourne Regiment, then sometime later as The Melbourne Rifles, the battalion eventually expanded to be 58th Battalion, The City of Essendon Regiment in 1955.

The battalion established its headquarters at Pascoe Vale Road Moonee Ponds and had companies at Footscray and Brunswick. It gained many new members through National Service, but lost many when the scheme ceased. This battalion was also absorbed into 1 RVR, when the pentropic organisation was adopted in 1960. Unlike the 5th and the 6th battalions the 58th Battalion has not since reappeared in the Australian Army's Order of Battle, yet strong links are still maintained by the 58th/32nd Battalion Association. The current Moonee Ponds Depot is still the location for their annual ANZAC day service. The 58th Battalion Colours were laid up on the 10 May 1970 located at the Essendon Town Hall. The 32nd Battalion Colours were laid up in August 1970, and are at St John's Anglican Church in Footscray.

=== 1960–1965 – The Pentropic experiment ===
A re-assessment of optimal fighting strengths and structure resulted in the Australian Army adopting a Pentropic arrangement for its battalions in 1960. All of the Victorian CMF Infantry units were affected by this and two units were created to replace the five older ones. 1 RVR comprised most metropolitan sub-units whilst 2 RVR was built from a mixture of city and metropolitan units.

The pentropic arrangement comprised five rifle companies, a support company, an administration company and a command element. For 1 RVR the break up of the Sub-units was as follows:

- A Company (The Scottish Coy);
- B Company (The Merri Coy);
- C Company (The Melbourne Coy) from the 6th Battalion;
- D Company (The Essendon Coy);
- E Company (The Footscray Coy) from the 58th/32nd Battalion; and
- Support Company was established from the 5th Battalion.

The term Royal Victoria Regiment had been adopted at the outset of the formation of the new unit, to reflect the connection of the unit with the State from which it was raised. This was an effort to uphold the traditions and maintain the ties to the local communities. At the same time, a new badge was adopted, which is still retained by current units. The regiment celebrated its birthday on 1 July 1960 as a result of this union.

=== 1965–1982 – A period of expansion ===
The pentropic arrangement was found to be generally unsuitable for use within the Australian Army and by 1965, alternatives had been studied and selected. On the 3 May 1965 both 1 RVR and 2 RVR were again split to form the following five units:

- 1st Battalion, The Royal Victoria Regiment (Melbourne Area),
- 2nd Battalion, The Royal Victoria Regiment (Country Areas),
- 5th Battalion, The Royal Victoria Regiment (Melbourne Area),
- 6th Battalion, The Royal Victoria Regiment (Melbourne Area), and
- 1st Independent Rifle Company (Mildura).

When National service ended in 1960 CMF units were again eroded, as they became completely voluntary units. However, National Service was again introduced in 1965, offering six years voluntary service in the CMF or two years full-time service, subject to being balloted by birth date, enabling all of the metropolitan units to remain at good manning levels. This scheme was abolished in 1973, however, and the Government commissioned a review into the training and organisation of the CMF. One result from this was that the CMF became known as the Australian Army Reserve or as it is more widely known: The Army Reserve.

1 RVR: The creation of 1 RVR essentially replaced 58th Battalion as the third metropolitan battalion. As with its predecessor, it was concentrated in the western and north-western parts of Melbourne. In 1975, 1 RVR absorbed both the 5 & 6 RVR due to all units being well below strength. This caused disruption to many members and was due at least in part to the fallout from the Australian involvement in Vietnam and the generally uninterested public view of the military following that unpopular conflict. With changes to its conditions of service, the number of people in the Army Reserve began to drop significantly. On the 14 November 1987, 1 RVR was absorbed into 5/6 RVR. The colours of 1 RVR were laid up on 25 April 1988 and remain at the Essendon Town Hall.

5 RVR: 5th Battalion was again manned effectively and in its distinctive dress. However, in 1966, a directive was issued that only one company in a Battalion was allowed to wear the traditional Scottish dress, a move that was not popular. The battalion received its new colours on 19 October 1969 at Royal Melbourne Showgrounds by His Excellency the Governor General of Victoria, Major General Sir Rohan Delacombe, KCMG, KBE, CB, DSO, KStJ. The Vietnam War saw the general community lose enthusiasm for the military, and the strength of all of the Battalions fell accordingly. The end of the involvement in Vietnam, and the end of National Service, severely affected the 5th Battalion. By 1975 the situation precipitated the amalgamation of all of the Victorian Battalions. 5 RVR's Colours were laid up once more although it would not be long before they would represent another unit.

6 RVR: The 6th Battalion once again took over its old stamping grounds with the end of the pentropic arrangements. As with 2 RVR and 5 RVR, 6 RVR was presented with new colours on 19 October 1969 at the Royal Melbourne Showgrounds. Due to community disinterest of Defence issues and the abolition of National Service, 6 RVR was amalgamated with the 5 RVR into 1 RVR in 1975. 6 RVR's Colours were laid up.

3 RVR: In 1973, in an era of declined interest in the Army Reserve, the four Victoria State infantry battalions and the independent rifle company were formed into one battalion for a major exercise and named 3 RVR. LTCOL Barry Ingram AM RFD ED was Commanding Officer. An unprecedented amount of resources were deployed to support 3RVR during its brief existence. This even included support from the RAAF.

=== The 1980s ===
5/6 RVR On 17 August 1982 a new Melbourne battalion was created: 5th/6th Battalion, The Royal Victoria Regiment. 5/6 RVR adopted the traditions of both The Victorian Scottish Regiment and the Royal Melbourne Regiment and recovered both sets of Colours to reflect this. The battalion also maintained its previous allegiances with The Gordon Highlanders and their extended affiliates, The Royal Regiment of Fusiliers and 6th Battalion, The Royal New Zealand Infantry Regiment. The amalgamation also involved combining some aspects of both units. The unit lanyard went from being just one colour to being a twisted braid of gold and khaki. The unit adopted "Our Director" as the battalion march, however, this was then changed to a combination of "Cock O' the North" and "Waltzing Matilda" incorporating the original marches of the 5th and 6th Battalions respectively. A Pipes and Drums was raised, and this is now the Regimental Band.

On 14 November 1987 1 RVR was absorbed into 5/6 RVR thus ending any connection with the pentropic organisation of the 1960s era. The Dibb Report of the mid-1980s saw the 5th/6th Battalion and the 4th Brigade given the task of Vital Asset Protection of the Tindal Air Force Base in the Northern Territory as its primary role. 5/6 RVR participated in two large multinational Kangaroo exercises in 1989 in support of this objective and also sent smaller elements to the region on other exercises.

In 1988, a decision was made to reintroduce Colour Patches for the first time since the end of the Second World War. The original 5th Battalion patch (as worn the day the 5th Battalion, 1st AIF, raised in Melbourne later to land at ANZAC Cove on the 25 April 1915) was adopted for the 5/6 RVR. This patch of a black rectangle on top of a red rectangle is worn on the puggaree of the slouch hat.

=== The 1990s ===
A change of Federal Government in 1995 led to a review of which impacted directly on the 4th Brigade in general and 5/6 RVR in particular. The brigade was to be "revitalized" and recruitment was stepped up to try (unsuccessfully) to increase the size of the battalion. At the same time more Regular Army Staff (including temporarily, a full-time Battalion Commander Lieutenant Colonel Mick Godfrey) were posted to try to increase the readiness and training tempo of the unit.

Training was well resourced and tested by independent observers in a readiness test at the Cultana training area in 1999, in which 5/6 RVR performed extremely well. The battalion also supplied a company group to rotate through the Butterworth Airbase, Malaysia, in Nov 1999 – Jan 2000. The company group was drawn primarily from 5/6 RVR with additional attachments coming from other units of 4th Brigade of the 2nd Division.

In 1999/2000 the escalating crisis in East Timor saw Australian troops leading a multinational 'intervention' force (INTERFET). Many Reservists initially served to "backfill" Australian Regular Army (ARA) positions when they were deployed to Timor with the 6th Battalion, The Royal Australian Regiment. As Australia's commitment to maintain a battalion was ongoing, a Rifle Company was raised from Reservists throughout Australia to serve with 5th/7th Battalion, The Royal Australian Regiment (RAR). This first tour of duty was from November 2002 until May 2003. Soldiers from both RVR battalions along with their NSW counterparts provided the majority of Reservists on Full Time Service. Timor was the first time since the mobilisation of the Militia (AMF) in the Papua New Guinea campaign of World War II that 'Citizen Soldiers' saw active service. At the conclusion of this deployment, many were to elect to remain in the Australian Regular Army whilst most returned home to Reserve Service.

=== The new millennium ===
==== 2000–2003 ====
In the year 2000 up to 200 5/6 RVR soldiers served with the ADF contingent in support of the Sydney Organising Committee for the Olympic Games (SOCOG) under "Operation Gold". Known as the Operational Search Company their duties included conducting area searches, building searches and manning vehicle checkpoints. Whilst full-time leadership and increased readiness had their benefits, increased time requirements for individual training for recruit and promotion courses contributed to a decline in Unit strength over the 2001/2002 period. The role of the Army Reserve was changing and so was 5/6 RVR in response to those changes. A dedicated staff of Reservists and full-time members continued to work to provide the expertise and staffing required to train and develop young and upcoming 5/6 RVR soldiers.

In early 2003, the Reserve Response Force (RRF) concept was being rolled out to 4th Brigade. 5/6 RVR was chosen to lead the first Reserve based 4th Brigade RRF. The RRF role was then devolved to unit level and 5/6 RVR continued to strengthen its role through Bravo Company, the largest Company, which was chosen to lead the battalion's RRF elements.

==== The Sesquicentenary – 150th anniversary ====
In 2004 5/6 RVR celebrated its Sesquicentenary – or 150th anniversary. A "Sesquicentenary Committee" was formed chaired by the Commanding Officer, LT COL Mark Richards. The committee was functionally led by Battalion 2IC MAJ Terry Kanellos and included current and past members of the battalion and networked extensively with the help of MAJ GEN James Barry, MAJ GEN Greg Garde and the then Regimental Colonel, COL Paul Riley. A number of activities and functions were planned throughout the year involving all ranks.

The year began with a series of Unit History presentations given throughout the battalion by Company personnel. Working with the support of Battalion Associations, the committee planned and conducted the following activities:

- An All Ranks Reception at Government House hosted by his Excellency, Mr John Landy AO, Governor of Victoria on 17 September 2004;
- A Freedom of the City of Melbourne march on 16 October 2004;
- Gala Ball – The Atrium Room Flemington Racecourse on 16 October 2004;
- An Employer Function – Hosted and sponsored by Mr & Mrs Dick and Jeanne Pratt at their Raheen Residence in Kew, Victoria on 25 November 2004; and
- An End of Year Battalion Christmas Party at the Telstra Dome on 11 December 2004.

The year also saw an increasing focus on the Battalion's role in 4 Brigade's Reserve Response Force (RRF), with an emphasis on training and individual preparedness. Urban tactical training and joint exercises held with The Victoria Police were performed to strengthen the battalion's ability to work with civil emergency services and giving commanders valuable experiences. The success of the year being measured by attendances of over 300 guests at the Gala Ball in October and similar numbers at the end of year function at the Telstra Dome.

==== 2005 – New CO takes 5/6 RVR to Canungra ====
2005 built on the gains of the previous year and a new Commanding Officer LT COL Neil Grimes marched in. The importance of individual preparedness was re-emphasised as Army Individual Readiness Notice (AIRN) criteria were applied to each member and it prepared for its annual field exercise (AFX) at Canungra in Queensland. A year for record Recruiting numbers, the benefits of one of the largest intakes of recruits in recent years also came to realisation, with all companies having new members join their ranks. 2005 also 5/6 RVR exercised its freedom of entry to the City of Boroondara on Sunday 17 October 2005.

==== 2006 – Operation Acolyte ====
In 2006, the battalion made a significant contribution to the conduct of the Commonwealth Games held in Melbourne during February and March on Operation Acolyte. Over 100 personnel drawn from throughout the battalion participated in the 10-week operation including searches of the Melbourne Cricket Ground, the Commonwealth Games Village in Parkville and the Melbourne Sports and Aquatic Centre. Members acted in both a military and civilian capacity with selected members being directly employed by the Melbourne 2006 organisation. Military members manned checkpoints and staffed a vehicle screening facility known as the Logistics Screening Zone where deliveries to locked down venues were electronically screened prior to entry.

==== Hardened & Networked Army ====
The Hardened & Networked Army (HNA) proposal was Army's response to the need to fight on a more complex and lethal battlefield. It would provide increased combat weight and generate greater organisational depth in Army and a greater focus on combined arms battlegroups and combat teams rather than infantry battalion and company groups. The result of HNA would be increased options for Government in terms of both the combat weight of the force that can be deployed and the duration that forces can be sustained on operations. Implementation of HNA started in 2006 and the force structure changes were due to be complete by the end of 2015.

Following HNA, a new structure emerged known as the High Readiness Reserve or HRR Combat Team. 4 BDE HRR was formed from a number of Units but predominantly manned and commanded by 5/6 RVR. The HRR Combat Team successfully participated in the Talisman Sabre series of major exercises with regular battalions and also contributed significantly to the East Timor deployment known as TLTG-4 in 2012.

A new role for the Army Reserve emerged in late 2006 with Army raising 2 new ARA infantry battalions. The structure of infantry battalions also changed and 5/6 RVR merged Delta Company at Simpson Barracks with Bravo Company Surrey Hills. Delta Company became known as 6 Platoon B Company, proud company members celebrated their last function together as Delta Company in December 2006. In August 2007, the battalion lost the old Delta Company depot at Simpson Barracks, and now all Bravo Company members parade at Surrey Hills.

==== Solomon Islands ====
In recent years, the 5th/6th Battalion has continued its tradition of overseas service by providing troops for Operation Anode as part of the Regional Assistance Mission to Solomon Islands (RAMSI), contributing to the first and probably last Solomon Island deployments: Op Citadel, Op Anode Rotation 13 in 2007, Rotation 15 in 2008, Rotation 18 in 2009 and Rotation 30 in 2013.

== Current structure ==
Today 5/6 RVR is organised as a standard light infantry battalion, with its respective sub-units situated throughout metropolitan Melbourne. In 2013, the 2nd/10th Field Regiment, based at 8 Chapel Street, St Kilda East, was downsized to a single battery and incorporated into the battalion's structure. In 2018, the battery was removed from the battalion to form part of the newly raised 9th Regiment, Royal Australian Artillery.

Current unit locations are:

- Battalion Headquarters (BHQ) – 202 Burwood Road, Hawthorn
- Alpha Company – 65 Princess Highway, Dandenong South
- Bravo Company – 12 Robinson Road, Surrey Hills
- Charlie Company – 67 Royal Avenue, Sandringham
- Delta Company – 127 Pascoe Vale Road, Moonee Ponds

During the Army Reserve training year (typically from mid February to early December), members of 5/6 RVR attend their respective depots every Tuesday night from 7:00 to 10:00. Battalion Headquarters is also open 8:00am to 4:00pm on weekdays. The battalion conducts a training weekend once a month, at a variety of locations, such as Simpson Barracks, Puckapunyal and RAAF Williams.

== Battle honours ==
The traditions, customs and experiences of infantry soldiers based in Melbourne are enshrined within the battalion and the various associations. As a tribute to previous units, 5/6 RVR holds the most battle honours and historically carries the following battle honours emblazoned on its colours:

Regimental Colour	Queens Colour
South Africa (1899–1902)	Bardia 1941
Pozieres	Capture of Tobruk
Ypres 1917	El Alamein
Amiens	Greece 1941
Mont St Quentin	South West Pacific 1942–45
Somme 1916, 1918	Bobdubi II
Bullecourt	Lae-Nadzab
Polygon Wood	Finisterres
Albert 1918	Hari River
Hindenburg Line	Borneo
Landing at ANZAC	

== Pipes and Drums ==
Formed in 1899 as part of The Victorian Scottish Regiment, the 5/6 RVR Pipes and Drums is today the band for all battalions of the Royal Victoria Regiment. It is supported by the RVR Pipes and Drums Association, an incorporated body.

== Alliances ==
- United Kingdom – once The Gordon Highlanders – then Highlanders (Seaforth, Gordons and Camerons) – now Royal Regiment of Scotland
- Canada – The Royal Regiment of Canada
- Canada – The Toronto Scottish Regiment – via Gordon Alliance
- Canada – 48th Highlanders of Canada – via Gordon Alliance
- South Africa – Cape Town Highlanders Regiment – via Gordon Alliance
- Canada – Lake Superior Scottish Regiment
- United Kingdom – Mercian Regiment
- United Kingdom – The Royal Regiment of Fusiliers - via Royal Melbourne Regiment

== See also ==
- Australian Army
- Australian Army Reserve
- List of Australian Army Regiments
- Royal Victoria Regiment
- London Scottish Regiment
- 8th/7th Battalion, Royal Victoria Regiment
