= Carl Jess =

Australian Army officer (1884–1948)

Sir Carl Herman Jess
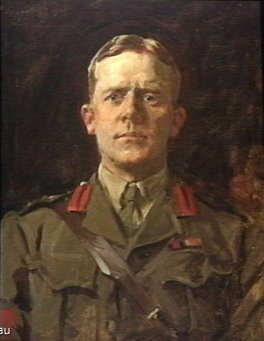
- Official Portrait of Brigadier General Carl Jess (1919)
- Born: 16 February 1884; Bendigo, Colony of Victoria
- Died: 16 June 1948 (aged 64); Melbourne, Victoria
- Relatives: John Jess (son); Carl McGibbon Jess (son)
- Military career
- Allegiance: Australia
- Branch: Australian Army
- Service years: 1899–1946
- Rank: Lieutenant General
- Commands: 4th Division (1932–33); 5th Military District (1927–31); 6th Military District (1925–27); Australian Imperial Force (1919–20); AIF Training Depot (1919); 10th Infantry Brigade (1918); 7th Battalion (1916–17)
- Conflicts: First World War; Gallipoli Campaign; Western Front; Battle of Pozières; Second World War
- Awards: Knight Bachelor; Companion of the Order of the Bath; Companion of the Order of St Michael and St George; Commander of the Order of the British Empire; Distinguished Service Order; Mentioned in Despatches (3); Officer of the Order of the White Eagle (Serbia)

Lieutenant General Sir Carl Herman Jess, CB, CMG, CBE, DSO (16 February 1884 – 16 June 1948) was an Australian Army officer who served in the First and Second World Wars.

== Early life and career ==
Jess was born on 16 February 1884 in Bendigo, Colony of Victoria, to George Jess, a German painter, and Mary, née Talty, an Irish immigrant. He was one of nine children and attended Violet Street State School in Bendigo. From 1899 to 1906, he worked as a teacher at the same school.

In 1899, Jess joined the First Victorian Volunteer Cadets and later enlisted in the 5th Battalion of the Victorian Infantry in February 1902. He quickly rose through the ranks to become a sergeant by 1904. In June 1906, he resigned from the militia and the Victorian Education Department to join the Instructional Staff of the permanent forces.

Jess was promoted to sergeant major on 1 January 1907 and commissioned as a full lieutenant on 1 July 1909. He served as brigade major of the 5th Infantry Brigade in New South Wales from 1 January 1911, initially as a temporary captain, which became permanent on 1 July 1912. He studied the Diploma of Military Science at the University of Sydney during this time. Jess later served as brigade major of the 15th Infantry Brigade in Victoria and as staff officer overseeing the Universal Training scheme in Victoria from 13 December 1911. On 1 July 1914, he was appointed Deputy Assistant Adjutants General of the 4th Military District in South Australia.

== First World War ==
During the First World War, Jess played a key role in mobilizing the Australian Military Force in South Australia. He prepared the South Australian contingent, including the 10th Infantry Battalion and the 2nd Squadron, 3rd Light Horse Regiment. Jess joined the Australian Imperial Force in Melbourne on 23 September 1914 as a staff captain with the 4th Infantry Brigade under Colonel John Monash.

Jess arrived at Anzac Cove on 25 April 1915 and served throughout the Gallipoli Campaign. He was promoted to brigade major of the 2nd Brigade on 23 May 1915, where he demonstrated bravery and leadership, notably in the attack on the German Officers' Trench on 7 August 1915. Known for his courage and composure under pressure, he was Mentioned in Despatches for his service and received the Order of the White Eagle from the King of Serbia in 1916.

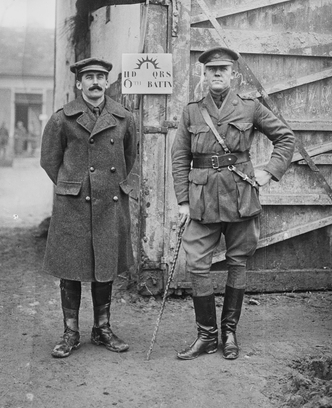
Informal portrait of Lieutenant Colonel Clarence Wells Didier Daly, CO 6th Battalion, AIF, and Lieutenant Colonel Carl Herman Jess, CO 7th Battalion AIF (right), in front of the former's battalion headquarters, France, December 1916.

Jess returned to Egypt on 7 January 1916 and was appointed commander of the 7th Battalion on 28 February. He was promoted to lieutenant colonel on 12 March. In July, he demonstrated exceptional leadership at Pozières despite being gassed. His bravery earned him two Mentioned in Despatches and the Distinguished Service Order (DSO) on 1 January 1917.

On 19 November, Jess was appointed as the first commandant of the I Anzac Corps School. However, on 27 November, he was recalled to temporarily command the 2nd Brigade. From 13 March 1917 to 8 September 1917, he served as an instructor at the School for Commanding Officers in Aldershot, England, becoming the first Australian officer to hold this position.

On 8 September 1917, Jess was appointed GSO2 at I Anzac Corps Headquarters, followed by a promotion to GSO1 at 2nd Division Headquarters on 7 January 1918. He then transferred to 3rd Division Headquarters on 20 January 1918. Jess was promoted to major in the AMF on 1 January 1918, lieutenant colonel on 3 June 1918, and colonel and temporary brigadier general on 7 October 1918, leading the 10th Infantry Brigade. For his service on the Western Front in the final year of the war, he was mentioned in despatches and appointed a Companion of the Order of St Michael and St George (CMG) in the 1919 New Year's List.

In March 1919, Jess assumed command of the AIF Training Depot at Codford, England. By July, he became Commandant of the AIF Administrative Headquarters in London. Jess succeeded Monash as Director General of Repatriation and later replaced General Sir William Birdwood as General Officer Commanding AIF, concluding the AIF's affairs overseas in January 1920. He was honored with the appointment as a Commander of the Order of the British Empire (CBE) for his contributions.

== Between the wars ==
After his AIF appointment ended on 21 January 1920, Jess resumed his permanent rank of lieutenant colonel. He attended the Staff College at Camberley and returned to Australia with his family after the birth of his first son, Carl McGibbon Jess in 1921. They received a civic welcome in his hometown of Bendigo.

In May 1921, Jess became a staff officer with the 4th Division. His son, John David Jess, was born in Melbourne in 1922. In 1925, he became Commandant of the 6th Military District in Tasmania. Promoted to full colonel in 1926, he became commandant of the 5th Military District in Western Australia in August 1927. Promoted to brigadier in January 1929, he served as aide-de-camp to the Governor General from 1931 to 1935. Jess organized centennial celebrations in Western Australia and Victoria in 1933, leading to his Knight Bachelor in the 1935 New Year's List.

In December 1934, Jess was appointed adjutant general and became a member of the Military Board. He was promoted to major general in July 1935.

== Second World War ==
During the outbreak of World War II, Jess was promoted to lieutenant general in December 1939 and awarded the Companion of the Order of the Bath in June 1939. As Adjutant General, he chaired the Department of Defence's Manpower Committee, overseeing a significant expansion of the militia. He later transferred to command the 6th Division after Major General Blamey's appointment.

Jess held the position until March 1944 and served as Director of Women's National Services (AWAS) in 1943. He oversaw the Australian Women's Land Army, which employed over 3,000 women in various roles across Australia.

== Later life ==
After leaving the Department of Labour and National Service in March 1944, Jess conducted a survey of army records, focusing on the activities of the AMF from 1929 to 1939. He went on sick leave in July 1945 and was placed on the retired list on 1 April 1946. Jess passed away from pulmonary tuberculosis at the Heidelberg Repatriation Hospital in Melbourne on 16 June 1948 and received full military honours at his cremation.

Jess was a prolific artist who created watercolour paintings of 19th- and 20th-century Australian and British military uniforms. His artworks were purchased by the Australian War Memorial in Canberra. Additionally, his hand-carved and painted models of military figures were exhibited at the Royal Military College, Duntroon, and later at the Shrine of Remembrance in Melbourne. These models are now held in private collections in Melbourne.

== Family ==
Carl Herman Jess married Marjorie Mary McGibbon in 1914 at St Luke's Anglican Church in North Fitzroy, Melbourne. They had three children: Carl McGibbon Jess, John David Jess, and Betty Marjorie MacLachlan. Carl died in WWII in Tobruk in 1941. John served as a member of Federal parliament for the seat of La Trobe from 1960 to 1972. Betty married Donald Jeffrey MacLachlan in 1947 at Melbourne Grammar School's Chapel.
