= William Scurry =

Australian soldier

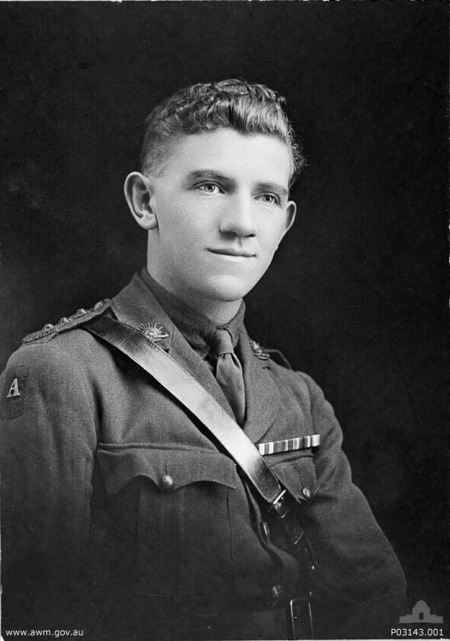
- William Scurry, c. 1919
- Born: 30 October 1895; Carlton, Victoria, Australia
- Died: 28 December 1963 (aged 68); Croydon, Victoria, Australia
- Military career
- Allegiance: Australia
- Branch: Australian Army
- Service years: 1913–1919; 1940–1945
- Rank: Major
- Conflicts: First World War; Gallipoli campaign; Western Front; Second World War
- Awards: Military Cross; Distinguished Conduct Medal; Mentioned in Despatches

William Charles Scurry, MC, DCM (30 October 1895 – 28 December 1963) was an Australian soldier who invented the self-firing "drip rifle" while serving as a lance corporal in the Gallipoli campaign during the First World War. He was decorated for his invention and was later commissioned and served as an officer during the fighting on the Western Front, where he commanded a mortar battery before being wounded in action.

In later life Scurry worked as an architectural modeller and orchardist before his war injuries forced him to retire. During the Second World War, he served on home service, as commandant of an internment camp before retiring to civilian life following the end of the war. He died in 1963.

== Early life ==
Scurry was born in Carlton, Melbourne, to William Charles Scurry, an architectural modeller, and his English wife, Bessie Scurry (née Preston). He attended Ascot Vale State School before working for his father's firm. As part of the compulsory training scheme he served in the Senior Cadets before progressing on to the Citizens Forces in 1913 where he served as a colour sergeant before being commissioned as a second lieutenant in May 1914 and assigned to the 58th Infantry (Essendon Rifles).

== First World War ==
Following the outbreak of the First World War, Scurry relinquished his commission and enlisted in the Australian Imperial Force in 1915 as a private. Assigned to the 7th Battalion, he was sent to join the battalion at Gallipoli in November 1915 and was promoted to lance corporal in December. Shortly after his arrival, the Allies decided to evacuate the peninsula; Scurry and his friend Alfred 'Bunty' Lawrence developed the self-firing "drip" rifle, which worked simply by having water from an empty ration tin drip into a lower tin attached to the trigger of a loaded rifle. When it was time to evacuate a small hole would be punched in the bottom of the uppermost tin. When the water in the lower tin reached a certain weight the rifle fired. This ruse led the Turkish defenders to believe that there were still troops fighting them while they were actually vulnerable to attack, being evacuated.

For his invention, Scurry was awarded the Distinguished Conduct Medal and Mentioned in Despatches. Following the evacuation, after the AIF had returned to Egypt, Scurry was promoted to sergeant, and on 20 February 1916 to second lieutenant. At this time the AIF underwent a period of expansion and experienced men were needed as cadre for new battalions that were being raised; subsequently Scurry was transferred to the 58th Battalion, and in June, as his battalion was deployed to France where they would serve in the trenches along the Western Front, Scurry was promoted to lieutenant.

Shortly after arriving in France, he was placed in command of the 15th Light Trench Mortar Battery on specific request of his brigade commander, Harold Elliott, who had been his battalion commander at Gallipoli, and promoted to temporary captain. For his leadership of this battery, he was later awarded the Military Cross. In 1916 he was badly wounded in Petillon, France, when inspecting a new kind of fuse on an unexploded bomb. He was evacuated to England and eventually lost the sight in one eye, and his right index finger. However, he continued to serve, and became an instructor at I Anzac Corps School at Aveluy in June 1917. He later became the School's chief instructor, then returned to the front in 1918.

== Later life ==
Following the Armistice, Scurry returned to Australia in 1919 and became engaged to Doris Barry, an Army nurse he had met in France. They were married in 1920 and had four children. He had to give up working as an architectural modeller as his vision failed, and returned to his father's firm in 1923. He subsequently moved to Silvan where he became an orchardist, but his injury forced him to give up this work also.

During the Second World War, Scurry re-enlisted in the Army on 5 September 1940 and served with the 17th Garrison Battalion with the rank of captain, later becoming commandant of the Tatura Internment Camp with the rank of major. He was discharged on 8 October 1945 and retired to Croydon, where he died on 28 December 1963 of a coronary occlusion, and was interred at Lilydale cemetery.
