= 8th/7th Battalion, Royal Victoria Regiment =

Australian Army infantry battalion

- Active: 1858–Present
- Country: Australia
- Branch: Australian Army
- Type: General Infantry, Special Operations Capable
- Role: Line infantry
- Part of: 4th Brigade, 2nd Division
- Garrison/HQ: Ranger Barracks, Ballarat
- Mottos: Swift and bold, yield to none
- Anniversaries: 9 August 1858 (battalion birthday)
- Engagements: Second Boer War, World War I World War II
- Battle honours: Boer War: South Africa 1899–1902; World War I: Landing at Anzac Cove, Somme 1916–1918, Bullecourt, Ypres 1917, Polygon Wood, Ameins, Albert 1918, Mont St Quentin, Hindenburg Line. World War II: Bardia 1941, Capture of Tobruk, El Alamein, Greece 1941, South West Pacific 1942–1945, Bobdubi, Finisterres, Hari River, Borneo.

Commanders
- Current commander: LTCOL Paul O'Donnell

Insignia
- Unit colour patch

The 8th/7th Battalion, Royal Victoria Regiment (8/7RVR) is a Line Infantry special operations capable unit within the Australian Defence Force's Royal Victorian Regiment (RVR). 8/7RVR combatants specialise in modern urban, desert and jungle warfare, and perform high risk, tactical and complex operational tasks.

8/7RVR is specifically structured to maintain a high-readiness standby capability to conduct domestic tactical operations that fall beyond the capability of Australia's State Victoria Police Special Operations Group.

The role of the state-based infantry regiments include strategic strike, direct action, and ground taking operations missions. Australian Army doctrine describes these units as: "spanning the gap between conventional infantry and Australia's special forces".

8/7RVR, along with the Royal Australian Regiment (RAR) and Australia’s other state-based infantry regiments are the Australian Army’s closest organisational and cultural analogue to the U.S. Army Rangers.

The 1st Commando Regiment and 2nd Commando Regiment are that of U.S Green Berets.

== History ==
The present day unit traces its lineage from a number of previous units, including 8th Battalion (City of Ballarat Regiment), 59th Battalion (The Hume Regiment), 7th Battalion (The North West Murray Borderers), and the 38th Battalion (The Northern Victorian Regiment).

The Ballarat phase of the battalion's history was formed as the Ballarat Volunteer Rifle Regiment on 9 August 1858 as a result of the Crimean War, coupled with the withdrawal of the British Army in 1857.

When war broke out in 1914, the 8th Battalion was recruited from the Ballarat and Ararat areas and the 7th Battalion from the North Western and Murray areas. Both battalions became well known and respected for their actions in the Gallipoli campaign and later in France, earning numerous Campaign and Battle honours, some of which are emblazoned on the Royal Victorian Regiment's Colours, with the remainder being held in trust by the Regimental council.

After World War I, further restructuring took place in the Ballarat and North-Western Regions. At the outbreak of World War II in 1939, both the 8th and 7th Battalions were again raised, and the two battalions served alongside by side during the most significant campaigns and battles of that war.

Following World War II, the 8th and 7th Battalions were amalgamated to form the 8th/7th Battalion, the North Western Victorian Regiment. The battalion retained its name until 1960, when Pentropic Divisions were formed and the battalion became 2RVR, absorbing the 8th/7th, 38th and 59th Battalions.

On 14 November 1987, the battalion was officially retitled the 8th/7th Battalion, The Royal Victoria Regiment. It has adopted the white (8th Battalion) and brown (7th Battalion) lanyard and wears the 8th Battalion colour patch (rectangle white over red). The Battalion Flag consists of the regimental badge on a diagonally split background of brown above white.

== Lineage ==
In the years between its formation and the outbreak of War in 1914, the battalion went through a series of name changes as follows:

- 1854 – Earliest units of the RVR formed (Melbourne Volunteer Rifle Regt.)
- 1858 – Ballarat Volunteer Rifle Regiment (in 1863 Ballarat Volunteer Rangers)
- 1884 – 3rd (Ballarat) Battalion, Victorian Rifles
- 1892 – 1st Battalion, 3rd Victorian Regiment
- 1898 – 3rd Battalion, Victoria Infantry Brigade
- 1901 – 3rd Battalion Infantry Brigade
- 1903 – 7th Australian Infantry Regiment
- 1908 – 1st Battalion 7th Australian Infantry Regiment
- 1912 – 70th Infantry (Ballarat Regiment) including Geelong & Queenscliff
- 1912 – 71st (City of Ballarat) Infantry including Warrnambool

Further to the north the following evolution was taking place (encompassing the Bendigo/Castlemaine and Murray river areas):

- 1858 – Bendigo Rifle Regiment
- 1860 – Bendigo Volunteer Rifle Corps
- 1863 – Castlemaine Volunteer Rifle Corps
- 1863 – Mount Alexander Battalion
- 1872 – Mount Alexnder Battalion Rifles
- 1884 – 4th Battalion, Victorian Rifles
- 1887 – 4th (Mount Alexander Battalion), Victorian Rifles
- 1892 – 2nd Battalion, 3rd Victorian Regiment
- 1896 – 4th Battalion, Victorian Infantry Brigade
- 1901 – 4th Battalion, Victorian Infantry Brigade
- 1903 – 8th Australian Infantry Regiment
- 1908 – 1st Battalion, 8th Australian Infantry Regiment (Castlemaine)
- 1908 – 2nd Battalion, 8th Australian Infantry Regiment (Bendigo)
- 1912 – 66th (Mount Alexander) Infantry
- 1912 – 67th (Bendigo) Infantry

Nore that the Territorial Titles for the 66th, 67th, 70th and 71st Infantry were added in 1913.

== Current structure ==
=== Structure ===
8/7RVR is composed of three rifle companies as well as a support company. Each rifle company comprises three platoons, themselves containing three sections (nine soldiers).

=== Activities and equipment ===
The battalion usually parades on Tuesday nights (7:00 p.m. until 10:00 p.m.) from early February until mid December, with one training weekend per month and at least one two-week training exercise taking place each year. There are several other training periods per year, including sub-unit (company) based exercises and a range week during which the battalion undertakes weapon training. This complements the 4th Brigade's contribution to larger exercises, enabling training in combined arms tactics with access to the Brigade's full suite of resources.

The battalion is light infantry based, and as such uses all the weapon platforms commonly found within an Australian infantry battalion, including the EF88 Austeyr rifle (5.56 mm), F89 Minimi machine gun (5.56 mm), MAG 58 machine gun (7.62 mm), M18A1 Claymore anti-personnel device, F1 grenade, M72 Short Range Anti-Armour Weapon (66 mm), and 84 mm Carl Gustav rocket launcher. Some 8/7RVR combatants also carry the Browning 9mm pistol.

=== Locations ===
8/7 RVR is located in the state of Victoria, with the battalion and its companies headquartered at:

- Battalion Headquarters (BHQ), Ranger Barracks, Sturt Street, Ballarat
- Alpha Company Headquarters (A Coy), Newland Barracks, Myers Street, Geelong
- Bravo Company Headquarters (B Coy), Sunshine Barracks, Duke Street, Sunshine
- Charlie Company Headquarters (C Coy), Passchendaele Barracks, Atlas Road, Bendigo (Junortoun)

The battalion also has regional depots located at:

- Somme Barracks, Sobroan Street, Shepparton
- RAAF Williams, Kidbrook Road, Laverton
- Kiarivu Barracks, San Mateo Avenue, Mildura
- Messines Barracks, Gray Street, Swan Hill
- Tel el Eisa Barracks, Pertobe Road, Warrnambool
- Monegeetta Proving Ground, Melbourne-Lancefield Road, Monegeetta

== Battle honours ==
The Royal Victoria Regiment has the enviable honour of having inherited the most battle honours of any other Infantry Regiment of the Australian Defence Force. 8/7 RVR currently holds the following battle honours:

- Boer War: South Africa 1899–1902.
- World War I: Landing at Anzac Cove, Somme 1916–1918, Bullecourt, Ypres 1917, Polygon Wood, Amiens, Albert 1918, Mont St Quentin, Hindenburg Line.
- World War II: Bardia 1941, Capture of Tobruk, El Alamein, Greece 1941, South West Pacific 1942–1945, Bobdubi, Finisterres, Hari River, Borneo.

== Alliances ==
- United Kingdom – 1st Battalion, The Mercian Regiment named after the medieval Kingdom of Mercia
- Canada – The Royal Regiment of Canada.
