= John Wilton (general) =

Australian Army chief (1910–1981)

Sir John Wilton
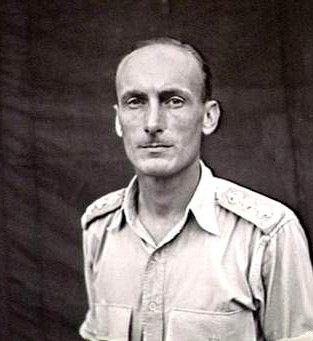
- Colonel John Wilton in Morotai, September 1945
- Born: 22 November 1910; Sydney
- Died: 10 May 1981 (aged 70); Canberra
- Military career
- Allegiance: Australia
- Branch: Australian Army; British Army
- Service years: 1927–1970
- Rank: General
- Nicknames: "Happy Jack"; "Smiling John"; "Sir Jovial"
- Service number: 216 (NX12337)
- Commands: 28th Commonwealth Brigade (1953–1954); Royal Military College, Duntroon (1957–1960); Chief of the General Staff (1963–1966); Chairman, Chiefs of Staff Committee (1966–1970)
- Conflicts: World War II; Middle East theatre; Syrian campaign; Battle of Merdjayoun; South West Pacific theatre; Salamaua-Lae campaign; Korean War; Indonesia–Malaysia confrontation; Vietnam War
- Awards: Knight Commander of the Order of the British Empire; Companion of the Order of the Bath; Distinguished Service Order; Mentioned in Despatches; Legion of Merit (US)
- Other work: Diplomat

General Sir John Gordon Noel Wilton, KBE, CB, DSO (22 November 1910 – 10 May 1981) was a senior commander in the Australian Army. He served as Chief of the General Staff (CGS), the Army's professional head, from 1963 until 1966, and as Chairman of the Chiefs of Staff Committee (CCOSC), forerunner of the role of Australia's Chief of the Defence Force, from 1966 until 1970. His eight-year tenure as senior officer of first the Army and then the Australian military spanned almost the entire period of the nation's involvement in the Vietnam War.

Born in Sydney, Wilton entered the Royal Military College, Duntroon, in 1927. Owing to lack of opportunity in the Australian military at the time, he took a commission in the British Army following his graduation in 1930. He spent most of the remainder of the decade with the Royal Artillery in India. Wilton returned to Australia on the eve of World War II and was commissioned into the Royal Australian Artillery. He saw action with the 7th Division in Syria and the 3rd Division in New Guinea, earning a mention in despatches in the former campaign and the Distinguished Service Order in the latter. Finishing the war a temporary colonel, he was appointed an Officer of the Order of the British Empire in 1947. Wilton was posted to Korea in 1953 to take command of the 28th Commonwealth Brigade, leading it in its final action of the war in July. He was raised to Commander of the Order of the British Empire and awarded the US Legion of Merit for his performance in Korea.

Wilton was promoted to major general in 1957 and became Commandant of Duntroon. He was appointed a Companion of the Order of the Bath in 1962 and made CGS the following January, with the rank of lieutenant general. As CGS he oversaw a reorganisation of the Army's divisional structure, the reintroduction of conscription, and deployments during the Indonesia–Malaysia Konfrontasi and the Vietnam War. Knighted in 1964, he handed over the position of CGS in May 1966 and was appointed CCOSC. In this role he had overall responsibility for Australia's forces in Vietnam, and worked to achieve an integrated defence organisation, including a tri-services academy, a joint intelligence group, and the amalgamation of separate government departments for the Army, Navy and Air Force. Wilton was promoted to general in September 1968, and retired from the military in November 1970. He served as Consul-General in New York City from 1973 to 1975, and died in 1981, aged seventy.

== Early career ==
John Wilton was born in Sydney on 22 November 1910, the second of two sons to English migrants Noel and Muriel Wilton. Noel was an electrical engineer, and moved with his family to Hobart in 1915 to take up employment with the Tasmanian Hydro Electric Department. Attending several schools, John and his brother Maurice lived in Sydney for a time with Muriel following their parents' separation in 1917, before Noel brought them back to Hobart in 1921. In 1923 he moved with them to Grafton, New South Wales, where he managed the Clarence River County Council. John attended Grafton High School, where he attained his leaving certificate. Considered by family to be a "loner", "a clear thinker", and a "quite, determined, achiever", he entered the Royal Military College, Duntroon, in February 1927, aged sixteen. Early on he was subjected to the usual bastardisation handed out to younger cadets by seniors, but was not known to inflict the same treatment on juniors once he reached the senior class. Although somewhat aloof from his fellows, he did well in team sports such as rugby and hockey, as well as swimming and diving. Second academically in his class of twelve, Wilton graduated from Duntroon on 9 December 1930.

By 1930, the effects of the Great Depression had reduced the opportunities for Duntroon graduates. Only four of Wilton's classmates joined the Australian Military Forces; four transferred to the Royal Australian Air Force (RAAF) and four to the British Army. Wilton was among the last-mentioned, taking a commission as a second lieutenant in the Royal Artillery, with seniority from 22 November 1930. Seeking active duty, he requested a posting to India, and sailed with the 6th Field Brigade to Bombay in November 1931. He spent the next three years based at Fyzabad, near the Nepalese border. Promoted to lieutenant in November 1933, he undertook training and exercises with his battery, and learned to speak Urdu, but saw no action. In February 1935 he was posted to Burma, joining the 10th (Abbottabad) Battery of the Indian Mountain Artillery at Maymyo, near Mandalay. According to biographer David Horner, Wilton's "first taste of excitement" was in April 1935, when he joined the hunt for a rogue tiger and shot the animal as it attacked and mauled one of his companions. In November he saw operational service with his unit in skirmishes with local tribesmen in the Wa State of northern Burma, on the Chinese border.

After eight months extended leave in 1936, and a posting to the Indian Army Ordnance Corps, Wilton briefly returned to Australia to marry Helen Marshall on 9 July 1938 at St. Andrew's Church in Summer Hill, New South Wales. John had met Helen, then a nurse, on a double date in Sydney while he was in his last year at Duntroon; the couple had two sons and a daughter. On the same trip home he was invited to transfer to the Australian military, and accepted. Promoted to captain on 31 December 1938, Wilton saw out his British service with a coastal battery in Karachi, and was commissioned into the Royal Australian Artillery on 26 May 1939. His service with the British Army in India and Burma had afforded him regimental experience that he could never have gained in Australia, as well as an understanding of mountainous and tropical conditions that would benefit him in years to come.

== World War II ==
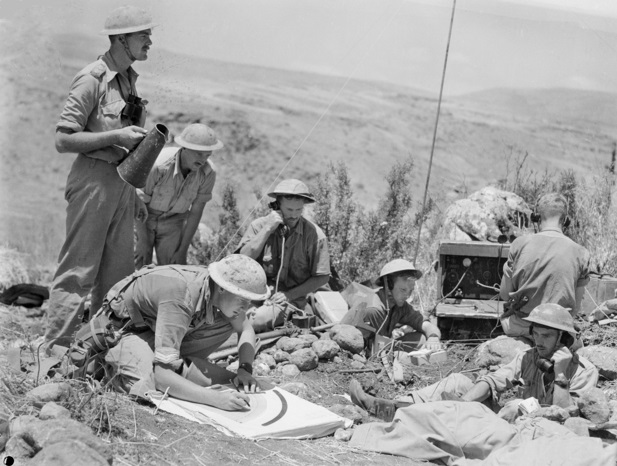
Command post of the 12th Battery, 2/6th Field Regiment, during the Battle of Merdjayoun, June 1941

Wilton spent a year in coastal artillery posts at North Head and Port Kembla before transferring to the Second Australian Imperial Force. He was promoted major on 7 May 1940 and given command of a battery in the 2/4th Field Regiment, part of the recently formed 7th Division, which embarked for the Middle East in October. On the voyage he wrote his wife a letter in case he was killed, admonishing: "Remember what has always been our motto—nothing can defeat us—not even death!" Appointed the division's brigade major Royal Artillery on 19 March 1941, Wilton served under Brigadier Frank Berryman in the Syrian campaign, and was responsible for coordinating operations during the Battle of Merdjayoun in June. Assigned to the staff of Headquarters I Corps, Wilton became General Staff Officer Grade 2 (Artillery) on 1 November; this would be the final artillery posting of his career. He was promoted to temporary lieutenant colonel on 25 November. On 30 December, Wilton was mentioned in despatches for his service with the 7th Division. He entered the Middle East Staff School at Haifa in January 1942, and graduated in May.

Returning to Australia, Wilton became General Staff Officer Grade 1 in Major General Stanley Savige's 3rd Division in August 1942. Savige later recalled that "I never had a more competent staff, nor such a co-operative team, than that staff after Wilton came along." The 3rd Division was part of Lieutenant General Edmund Herring's II Corps. In October, Herring succeeded Lieutenant General Sydney Rowell as commander of New Guinea Force, and Savige became acting corps commander. With his attention focused on the corps, Savige relied on Wilton to supervise the training of the 3rd Division. Wilton travelled to New Guinea in February 1943 to reconnoitre the terrain and begin plans for the division's forthcoming campaign in Salamaua. He was attached to Kanga Force in Wau during March 1943, before its absorption by 3rd Division the following month. Herring had ordered that the 3rd Division "threaten" Salamaua, and despite Wilton's attempts to clarify precisely what this meant, the order remained vague. Savige and Wilton interpreted it as meaning that the 3rd Division was to capture Salamaua, when in fact its main purpose in the campaign was to divert Japanese forces from Lae. In any event, 3rd Division progressed steadily and by August it had to be ordered to slow down so that Lae could be attacked before Salamaua. Wilton received much of the credit for 3rd Division's performance. He was awarded the Distinguished Service Order (DSO) for his "skill and ability in New Guinea" between July 1942 and April 1943, the citation being promulgated on 27 April 1944.

In September 1943, following his service with 3rd Division, Wilton was posted to Washington, D.C. as General Staff Officer, Australian Military Mission; he spent November and December 1944 in Europe, observing the Allies' military organisation. He was promoted temporary colonel in May 1945, and spent the remainder of the war on the staff of General Sir Thomas Blamey's Advanced Land Headquarters at Morotai in the Dutch East Indies and Forward Echelon Advance Land Headquarters at Manila in the Philippines. On Blamey's recommendation, Wilton was honoured for the "particularly high standard" of his work on the general staff with appointment as an Officer of the Order of the British Empire (OBE), promulgated on 6 March 1947.

== Post-war career ==
=== Rise to senior command ===
Wilton was still only a substantive captain at the end of hostilities, but was considered by the Military Board to be among those "promising officers who have forced their way to the top during the war" and hence to deserve retention of their wartime rank. He became Deputy Director of Military Operations and Plans at Army Headquarters (AHQ), Melbourne, in March 1946 and was promoted to substantive lieutenant-colonel on 30 September. Wilton took charge of Military Operations and Plans the following year. He was promoted substantive colonel on 11 April 1950, and appointed a member of the Bridgeford Mission, which advised the Australian government on the state of the Malayan Emergency. On a visit to Singapore in February–March 1951 as part of a joint planning team, he urged his British counterparts to maintain their presence in Malaya as the basis of a combined force, without which Australia would be reluctant to commit any troops for the region's security. Wilton relinquished his post at AHQ in November 1951, and attended the Imperial Defence College in London during 1952. Having been assigned a combat command in the Korean War, he was promoted to brigadier on 13 March 1953, arrived in Seoul within the week, and took over the 28th Commonwealth Brigade from fellow Duntroon graduate Brigadier Thomas Daly on 25 March.

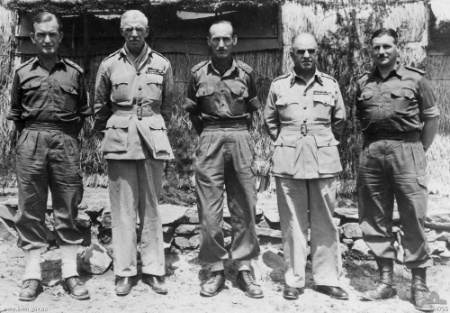
Brigadier Wilton (centre) commanding the 28th Commonwealth Brigade in Korea, flanked by Lieutenant Generals Sir Sydney Rowell (second left) and Henry Wells (second right), in 1953

The 28th was described in the official history of Australia's involvement in the Korean War as "the most nationally diverse" brigade in the 1st Commonwealth Division, consisting of Australian, British, Indian and New Zealand units, yet also "an outstandingly well-knit formation". After operating on the eastern side of the Jamestown Line from April, the 28th was transferred westward to relieve the 29th Brigade at the Hook, the Commonwealth Division's most vulnerable position, on 9–10 July. At 6:15pm on 23 July, Wilton informed his battalion chiefs that an armistice was ready to be signed, and to keep patrols to the minimum level necessary for the line's security. The brigade's last action took place over the next three days, when it used artillery, mortar, machine-gun and rifle fire to repulse a heavy assault by Chinese troops, inflicting as many as 3,000 casualties. Wilton later recalled the "terrible and gruesome sight" of no-man's land "literally carpeted with dead bodies". He was present for the armistice ceremony at Panmunjom on 27 July. Having succeeded in maintaining his command's discipline and morale during a potentially problematic time at the end of the conflict and the beginning of peace, he handed over the 28th to Brigadier Ian Murdoch on 19 February 1954. For his service in Korea, Wilton was raised to Commander of the Order of the British Empire (CBE) in the Queen's Birthday Honours on 10 June 1954. He was also awarded the US Legion of Merit for his "outstanding leadership and initiative"; the decoration was gazetted on 1 May 1956.

After returning to Australia, Wilton was appointed Brigadier in Charge of Administration at Headquarters Eastern Command, his first administrative post. In November 1955 he was assigned to the General Staff at AHQ, where he was responsible for intelligence, operations and plans, and took part in Australian preparations for SEATO exercises. He was promoted to major general on 24 March 1957, and became Commandant of the Royal Military College, Duntroon. Although not strongly religious, Wilton considered himself responsible for the spiritual and moral development of younger cadets; he made a point of attending church parade regularly, and in 1959 personally launched an appeal for public funds to build the college's Anzac Memorial Chapel, which would open in 1966. His chief goal, though, was academic: concerned that graduates were at risk of falling behind their increasingly tertiary-qualified peers in industry and public service, he worked assiduously to make the college a degree-granting institution; this was realised in 1967. From June 1960 through 1962, Wilton was Chief of the Military Planning Office at SEATO Headquarters, Bangkok. He believed Thailand to be strategically vital, declaring "if you want to hold Southeast Asia, you need to hold Thailand". His position allowed him to closely observe the deteriorating situation in Laos, which threatened to spill over into Thailand, and the Western Powers' growing focus on South Vietnam. He was appointed a Companion of the Order of the Bath (CB) in the 1962 Queen's Birthday Honours, in particular for his "conspicuous devotion to duty and his singleness of purpose" as Commandant of Duntroon. On 21 January 1963, Wilton was promoted lieutenant general and became Chief of the General Staff (CGS), succeeding Lieutenant General Sir Reginald Pollard. He was appointed a Knight Commander of the Order of the British Empire (KBE) in the 1964 New Year Honours.

=== Chief of the General Staff ===
Following the lead of the US Army, in 1960 the Australian Army had replaced its former "triangular" divisional structure of three infantry battalions under a brigade headquarters, with a "pentropic" organisation consisting of five larger battalions without a brigade layer between division and battalion headquarters. This had the effect of reducing the total number of Australian battalions, while increasing their individual strength. Wilton was unhappy with the pentropic structure, reasoning that the number of battalions, rather than their relative strength, was the overriding factor when considering potential overseas deployments. The US had in any event abandoned the system in June 1961. In October 1964, Wilton commissioned a review that ultimately recommended a return to the triangular formation. In the meantime, as a response to the Indonesia–Malaysia Konfrontasi, the Australian government reintroduced conscription, which Wilton fought until convinced that the government was not going to improve pay and conditions sufficiently to attract by any other means the recruits needed to meet overseas commitments. Wilton was keen to mitigate any prejudices the national servicemen might have against the regular soldiery, and vice versa; when he found a memo from an Army committee asserting that "it must be recognised that the NS man was likely to be a reluctant soldier", he wrote on it "This assumption not justified". In February–March 1965, following a request from the Malaysian government, Australia despatched 1 Squadron, Special Air Service Regiment, and 3rd Battalion, Royal Australian Regiment, to Borneo—a commitment Wilton felt able to recommend as a result of the recent decisions to increase the Army's personnel and battalion numbers.

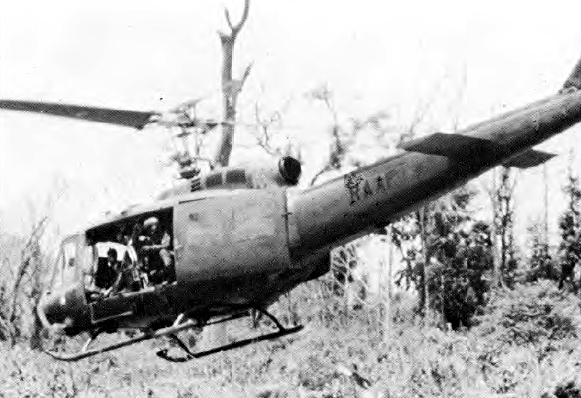
UH-1 Iroquois of No. 9 Squadron RAAF in Vietnam

By mid-1964, Australia had already sent a small team of military advisors, as well as a flight of newly acquired DHC-4 Caribou transports, to aid the South Vietnamese government in its fight against the Viet Cong. The 1st Battalion, Royal Australian Regiment, was deployed in May 1965. It was attached to a US Army brigade, and Wilton was responsible for setting its operational parameters. In August, he recommended to his opposite number in the RAAF, Air Marshal Alister Murdoch, the despatch of two UH-1 Iroquois helicopters to Vietnam. Wilton believed that both services would benefit from gaining familiarisation with air/ground operations in the region before any large-scale commitment of Australian forces. He was exasperated when Murdoch rejected the idea on resourcing grounds, despite the fact that two-thirds of the RAAF's UH-1 complement had been purchased for the express purpose of army cooperation. According to the official history of the post-war Air Force, when the Federal government deployed No. 9 Squadron and its UH-1s to Vietnam less than a year later, the unit was under-prepared for combat operations.

Wilton supported the RAAF's request that the deputy commander of Australian Forces Vietnam be an air officer, despite the misgivings of some senior Army personnel and the fact that an appointment of this level was not commensurate with the services' relative commitments to the conflict. In what the official history of Australia in the Vietnam War described as a "pragmatic and far-sighted approach", Wilton expressed his hope that such an arrangement would give the Air Force a closer understanding of land/air cooperation, and avoid "increasing differences of views about strategic and tactical concepts with the Australian Armed Forces". Following the Federal government's decision in March 1966 to despatch a task force of two battalions to Vietnam, Wilton negotiated with US and South Vietnamese commanders a self-contained area of operations for the Australians, in Phuoc Tuy Province, where they could function with a reasonable degree of independence. He also approved Nui Dat, in the centre of the province forward of the major population areas, as the task force's main base, despite its distance from support units in Vung Tau and the extra effort required to defend it. Wilton rejected a mobile role for the Australians that would have placed them under the control of a US division because, he believed, "their operations became a bit of a meat grinder" with "tremendous casualties". On 19 May 1966, he took over from Air Chief Marshal Sir Frederick Scherger as Chairman of the Chiefs of Staff Committee (CCOSC), a position foreshadowing that of the modern Chief of the Defence Force. He was succeeded as CGS by Lieutenant General Daly. According to the official history, the timing of the CCOSC handover was "especially significant" as it "coincided with the change in Vietnam from an Army force which was responsible to the Chief of the General Staff to a combined force responsive to the Chairman, Chiefs of Staff Committee. Wilton, therefore, carried through his responsibilities concerning the Vietnam commitment to his new appointment."

=== Chairman of the Chiefs of Staff Committee ===
==== Vietnam ====
Wilton accepted the domino theory and never wavered in his commitment to Vietnam, but as early as mid-1967 he doubted that the war could be won unless the US was prepared to go all out and invade the North. Cautious about expanding Australia's involvement, he advocated deploying a Centurion tank squadron rather than a third infantry battalion when calls came to increase the strength of the task force in Vietnam, but in the end the Federal government announced both commitments in October 1967. Wilton also advised the government to reject any requests from the US command in Vietnam to rotate the Australian task force out of Phuoc Tuy and display its capabilities in a wider operational arena, reasoning that it was more important for the troops to remain in the countryside they knew and continue to build relations with the local people. He nevertheless strongly backed the Australian task force commander, Brigadier Ronald Hughes, when the latter was criticised at home for conducting "American style operations" outside the immediate vicinity of Phuoc Tuy, such as the set-piece battles of Fire Support Bases Coral and Balmoral in mid-1968. Conflict continued to simmer between the Army and the RAAF regarding air support, and Wilton oversaw discussions between Daly and Murdoch that secured a separate Army air organisation, leading to the formation of the Australian Army Aviation Corps in July 1968. On 22 August, the Federal government announced that Wilton would be promoted to general, effective 1 September, in recognition of his "outstanding contribution to the Commonwealth in his present appointment". He was the first Australian officer to attain the rank since Blamey, twenty-seven years before.

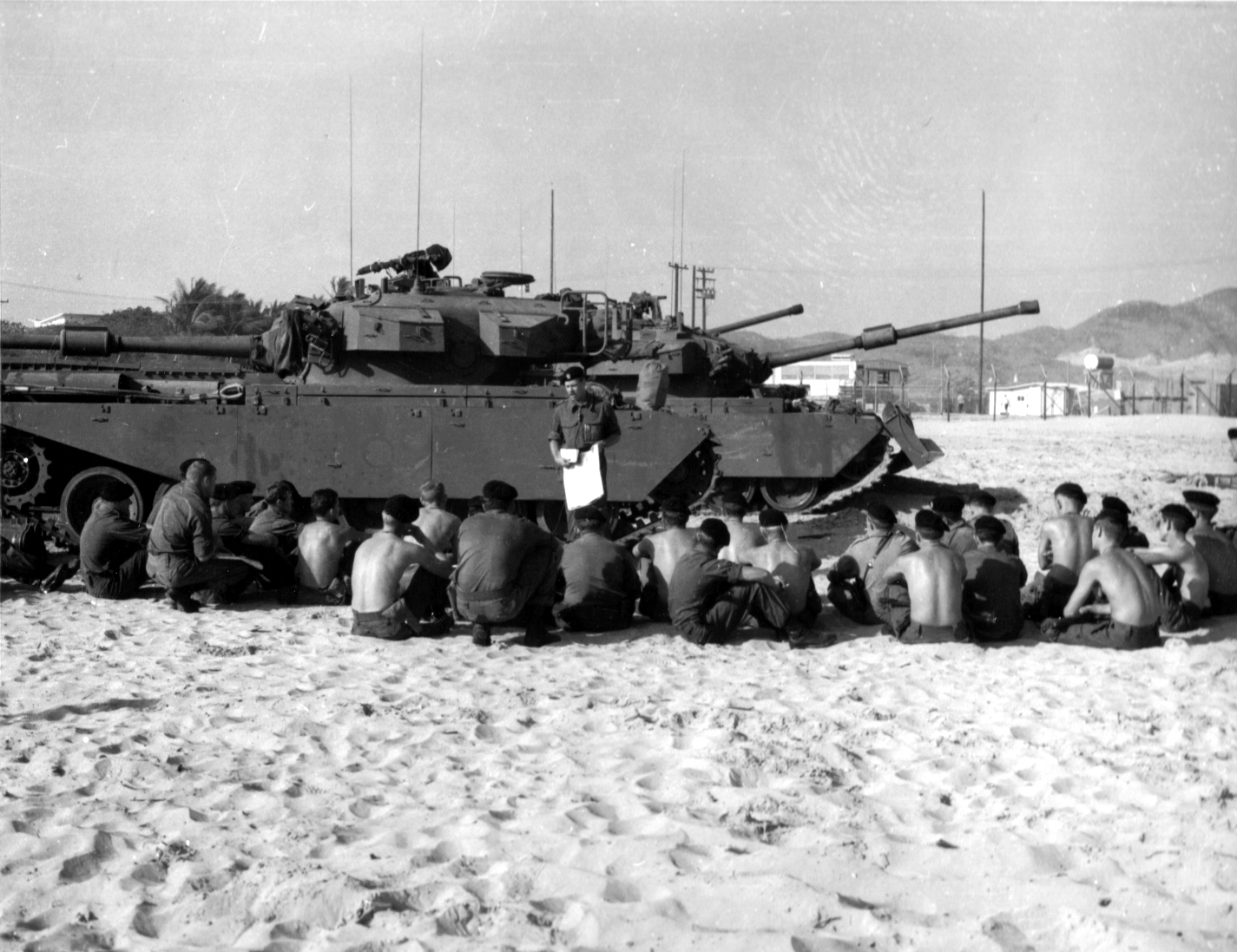
Centurion tanks of the Australian 1st Armoured Regiment at Vung Tau, South Vietnam, in 1968

US troop reductions in 1969 under President Richard Nixon's Vietnamization policy led to increasing demands for similar withdrawals of Australian troops. Wilton, Daly and other senior officers argued that the "balanced" nature of the Australian task force would be damaged by a piecemeal withdrawal and that the only valid form of reduction would be "one out, all out"; the government chose a phased withdrawal, pulling out one battalion in October 1970 and the other two in October and December 1971. The divisive nature of the war caused conflict within Wilton's own family; all his children actively opposed it, and in September 1969 his son Robert publicly burnt his draft deferment notice outside Parliament House, Canberra, having earlier called upon students at the Australian National University not to register for national service. The Canberra Times ran an article on the Parliament House incident, complete with a photograph of Robert burning his notice. As Australia's senior soldier, Wilton refused to comment on the situation; Robert reported that he and his father respected one another's viewpoints, and relations within the family remained amicable.

One of the most controversial aspects of Australia's conduct of the Vietnam War had been the employment of a barrier minefield around Phuoc Tuy from 1967 to 1969. Wilton maintained that the minefield was already under construction when he first learned of it, and that he considered the decision within the purview of the commander on the ground, Brigadier Stuart Graham. When confronted with the increasing casualties among Australian troops from mines evidently lifted from the area by the Viet Cong, he pointed out that the South Vietnamese, who had been expected to patrol the minefield, were not playing their part. Wilton further believed that the barrier minefield was an innovative solution to the problems facing the task force and that the commander's decision to implement it was "better than sitting on his backside and not trying anything". He rejected suggestions by critics that the minefield was "the biggest blunder" Australia made in Vietnam, declaring that this was "like being wise after the event".

==== Joint defence aspirations ====
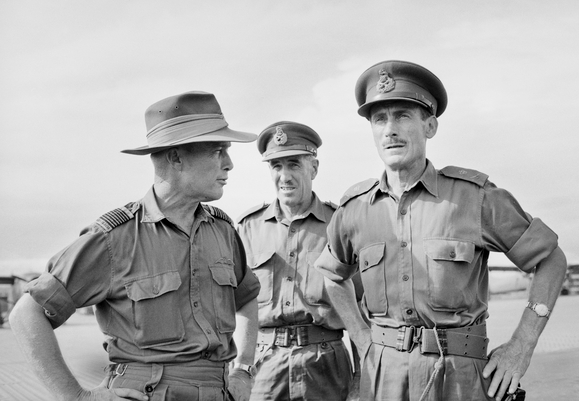
Lieutenant General Wilton as Chairman of the Chiefs of Staff Committee, with Group Captain Peter Raw (left) and Major General Kenneth MacKay (centre) at Vung Tau Airfield, South Vietnam, in 1966

Wilton's position as CCOSC had no statutory authority over the heads of the Army, Navy and Air Force, nor a direct line of command to Australian Forces Vietnam. David Horner noted that in an emergency, Wilton "had to issue directives and then seek retrospective endorsement of them by either the minister or the Chiefs of Staff Committee." According to historian Eric Andrews, Wilton "chafed over his lack of command over the services and the need for organisational reform". While CGS, he had joined Scherger in calling for a single Australian Defence Force organisation with one Minister of Defence, in contrast to the existing arrangement where each service operated with virtual autonomy, supported by its own minister and department. In July 1967, he became a member of the Tertiary Education (Services' Cadet Colleges) Committee to plan a tri-service military academy, which was eventually opened as the Australian Defence Force Academy in 1986. He was also able to push through a plan to establish, in 1970, the Joint Intelligence Organisation to replace the former Joint Intelligence Bureau and three single-service intelligence groups.

In 1967, and again in 1970, Wilton recommended the creation of a single Defence Board of Administration, consisting of the Defence Minister, the Defence Secretary, CCOSC, and the three service chiefs, to take over the functions of the Air, Military, and Naval Boards, along with those of their separate ministers. Though nothing came of this at the time, Wilton was consulted by the Labor Party before it began reorganising the Defence Department soon after defeating the Liberals in the December 1972 Federal election. The following year, the single-service ministries were abolished in favour of an all-encompassing Department of Defence; by 1984, the CCOSC position had evolved to become the Chief of the Defence Force, directly commanding all three armed services through their respective chiefs.

== Later life ==
Wilton was succeeded as CCOSC by Admiral Sir Victor Smith on 23 November 1970, and retired from the military. He subsequently worked on the Kerr Committee that reviewed pay and conditions in the armed forces, visiting several overseas bases including Nui Dat and Vung Tau. Wilton finished his career as a diplomat, serving as Australia's Consul-General in New York from September 1973 to November 1975. In 1979 he became one of the first sponsors of the Aboriginal Treaty Committee, which advocated for a treaty between the Federal government and Aboriginal representatives. He died of prostate cancer at his home in Canberra on 10 May 1981, aged seventy. Wilton was accorded a military funeral at Duntroon, in the Anzac Memorial Chapel he helped found, and cremated at Norwood Park Crematorium, Canberra.

== Legacy ==
Reflecting on Australia's involvement in the Vietnam War, Wilton considered that it was justified, and that the West's intervention helped delay the takeover of South Vietnam, and the spread of communism to Laos and Cambodia, by almost a decade. "Whether that was worthwhile", he added, "is a matter for the historian to judge". The key lesson, he felt, was not to intervene in a conflict "unless you are prepared to win", because it was "not something that you can just put one foot in and feel the temperature".

You can't have your three services fighting three separate wars ... It's as simple as that.

— General John Wilton on joint warfare

Biographer David Horner described Wilton as "arguably the most important and influential Australian Army officer in the second half of the twentieth century". Horner credited him with making significant contributions to the evolution of the Australian Defence Force through the pursuit of joint command and control. He further noted that whereas Wilton's predecessor as CCOSC, Scherger, had been promoted to 4-star rank after four years in the role, and Wilton himself after two-and-a-half, Wilton's successors gained their 4-star rank upon taking up the position, indicating its growing importance.

From an early age Wilton was considered cerebral and introspective; his colleagues in adulthood found him to have an incisive mind, high standards, and little inclination or capacity for small talk. His serious demeanour earned him the ironic nicknames "Happy Jack", "Smiling John" and "Sir Jovial", though he was capable of thoughtful gestures and flashes of humour. Major General Paul Cullen, the Citizen Military Forces member of the Military Board from 1964 to 1966, described Wilton as "very stiff, very regular, very formal—but a pleasant man". Korean War historian Robert O'Neill contended that "One of the most remarkable aspects of his career was that he rose so far through a highly competitive profession without ever playing to the gallery."

== Notes ==
Military offices
| Preceded by Air Chief Marshal Sir Frederick Scherger | Chairman, Chiefs of Staff Committee; 1966–1970 | Succeeded by Admiral Sir Victor Smith |
| Preceded by Lieutenant General Sir Reginald Pollard | Chief of the General Staff; 1963–1966 | Succeeded by Lieutenant General Sir Thomas Daly |
Diplomatic posts
| Preceded by John Bates | Australian Consul General in New York; 1973–1975 | Succeeded by Peter Barbour |
