= Ragnar Garrett =

Australian general (1900–1977)

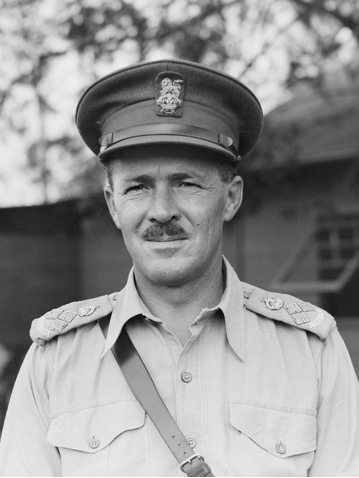
- Brigadier Garrett, February 1944
- Born: 12 February 1900; Northam, Western Australia
- Died: 4 November 1977 (aged 77); Mornington, Victoria
- Military career
- Allegiance: Australia
- Service/branch: Australian Army
- Service years: 1918–60
- Rank: Lieutenant General
- Service number: 210 (NX12338, NX346)
- Commands: 2/31st Battalion (1940–41); 8th Brigade (1945–46); Staff College, Queenscliff (1946–47, 1949–51); Western Command (1951–53); Southern Command (1954–58); Chief of the General Staff (1958–60)
- Conflicts: Second World War; Mediterranean theatre; Battle of Greece; Battle of Crete; South West Pacific theatre; New Guinea campaign; Bougainville campaign; Occupation of Japan
- Awards: Knight Commander of the Order of the British Empire; Companion of the Order of the Bath; Mentioned in Despatches
- Other work: Principal, Australian Administrative Staff College (1960–64)

Lieutenant General Sir Alwyn Ragnar Garrett, KBE, CB (12 February 1900 – 4 November 1977) was a senior commander in the Australian Army. He served as Chief of the General Staff (CGS) from 1958 to 1960.

Born in Western Australia, Garrett graduated from the Royal Military College, Duntroon, in 1921. He was adjutant and quartermaster in several regiments of the Australian Light Horse before undertaking staff training in England, which he completed just as the Second World War broke out. Garrett joined the Second Australian Imperial Force soon afterwards, and commanded the 2/31st Battalion in England before seeing action with Australian brigades in Greece and Crete in 1941. Promoted to colonel the following year, he held senior positions with I Corps in New Guinea and II Corps on Bougainville in 1944–1945. He was appointed a Commander of the Order of the British Empire for his staff work.

After the war, Garrett served two terms as commandant of the Staff College, Queenscliff, in 1946–1947 and 1949–1951. Between these appointments he was posted to Japan with the British Commonwealth Occupation Force. Promoted to major general, he took charge of Western Command in August 1951, and became Deputy Chief of the General Staff in January 1953. He took over Southern Command as a lieutenant general in October 1954, and was appointed a Companion of the Order of the Bath in 1957. As CGS from March 1958, Garrett focused on rearmament and reorganisation, initiating the Army's short-lived restructure into a "pentropic" formation. He was knighted in 1959. After retiring from the military in June 1960, Garrett became honorary colonel of the Royal Australian Regiment, and was principal of the Australian Administrative Staff College until 1964. He died at Mornington, Victoria, in 1977.

== Early life ==
Born on 12 February 1900 in Northam, Western Australia, Alwyn Ragnar Garrett was the son of accountant Alwyn Garrett and his Swedish wife Maria Carolina (née Wohlfahrt). Ragnar attended Guildford Grammar School before entering the Royal Military College, Duntroon, in 1918. He graduated in 1921 and was posted to the Australian Light Horse as a lieutenant. In November 1922, Garrett was appointed adjutant/quartermaster of the 23rd Light Horse Regiment. The following month he served as an extra aide-de-camp to the new Governor of South Australia, General Sir Tom Bridges. In November 1923, Garrett was seconded to the British Army, and spent the next twelve months attached to the 2nd Dragoon Guards in Bangalore, India. On his return to Australia in January 1925, he was reappointed adjutant/quartermaster of the 23rd Light Horse. He married Shirley Lorraine Hunter, a nurse, on 9 September at St Peter's Anglican Church in the Adelaide suburb of Glenelg; the couple had a son and a daughter. Garrett became adjutant/quartermaster of the 9th Light Horse Regiment at Jamestown, South Australia, in February 1926. He was promoted to captain in November 1929.

In March 1930, Garrett was posted as adjutant/quartermaster to the 3rd Light Horse Regiment at Mount Gambier, South Australia. As a speaker at Mount Gambier's Anzac Day commemorations on 25 April 1934, he was reported as warning of the poor state of Australia's preparedness for war, admonishing: "We shall not have the time that we had before the last war, and we shall not be fighting for our homes thousands of miles away. We shall be fighting at our own back door. That is what we have to prepare for." That August he was transferred to the 4th Light Horse Regiment at Warrnambool, Victoria, as adjutant/quartermaster. Garrett was posted to the staff of Army Headquarters, Melbourne, in March 1936, and departed for England in November 1937 to attend the Staff College, Camberley. He was promoted to major in July 1938, and returned to Australia upon the outbreak of the Second World War.

== Second World War ==
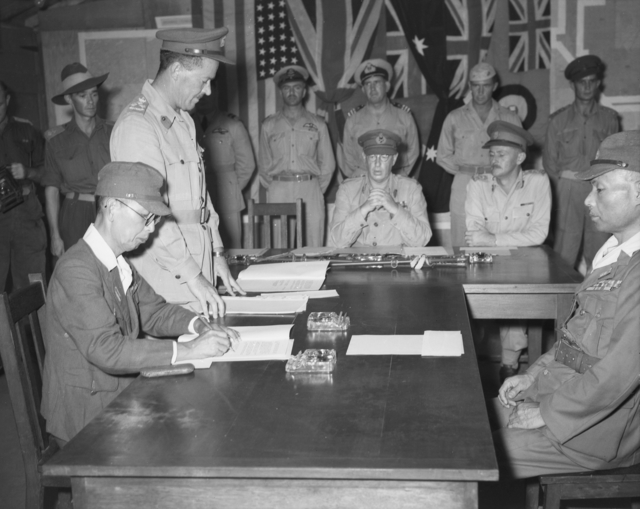
Brigadier Garrett with Lieutenant General Kanda at the Japanese surrender on Bougainville, 8 September 1945. Vice Admiral Samejima sits opposite, and Lieutenant General Savige is at the head of table.

Garrett joined the Second Australian Imperial Force in November 1939, and was appointed brigade major of the 18th Brigade under Brigadier Leslie Morshead in January 1940. The brigade departed for the Middle East in May but, owing to the military situation following the Fall of France, it was diverted to Britain, arriving in June. Garrett was promoted lieutenant colonel on 16 September and took command of the 2/31st Battalion the same day; he handed over to Selwyn Porter in February 1941, and departed England for the Middle East. From March to June he served as General Staff Officer Grade 2 (Operations) of I Corps under Lieutenant General Sir Thomas Blamey. In April Garrett was briefly seconded to Savige Force, which fought in Greece under Brigadier Stanley Savige. Savige recorded that when Garrett was posted back to corps headquarters, it "affected me more than the bombing ... I was very sorry to lose Garrett, who served me splendidly over the hectic days of the recent past". Garrett was also attached to the 19th Brigade in Crete.

Returning to Australia, Garrett was promoted to temporary colonel in April 1942 and became senior operations officer in the 1st Armoured Division, which formed a key part of the forces held in reserve to contest a Japanese invasion. He was posted to Army Headquarters, Melbourne, in October as Director of Armoured Fighting Vehicles. In September 1943, he was appointed General Staff Officer Grade 1 (Operations) of I Corps under Lieutenant General Sir Edmund Herring in New Guinea. Three months later he was promoted to temporary brigadier and became Brigadier General Staff of I Corps. He continued to serve in that position as I Corps was redesignated II Corps in April 1944, New Guinea Force the following month, and finally II Corps again in October 1944 for the campaign on Bougainville under Lieutenant General Savige. The campaign was controversial in that it appeared to have little impact on the main drive against Japan; Garrett was quoted as calling it "an absolute waste of time".

Garrett was appointed a Commander of the Order of the British Empire for his "skill, direction, and supervision of the highest order" in having "prepared and guided all staff work to meet every conceivable requirement in the complete reorganisation of forces in New Guinea"; the honour was promulgated in The London Gazette on 19 July 1945. Garrett was also responsible for interrogating the first Japanese peace envoy to make contact with the Australians on Bougainville, on 18 August 1945, and was present when the instrument of surrender was signed on 8 September. In November 1945, he took command of the 8th Brigade in New Guinea. He oversaw the brigade's return to Australia before its disbandment in March 1946. His "exceptional service in the field" in the South West Pacific Area earned him a mention in despatches, which was gazetted on 6 March 1947 and backdated to 2 November 1946.

== Post-war career ==
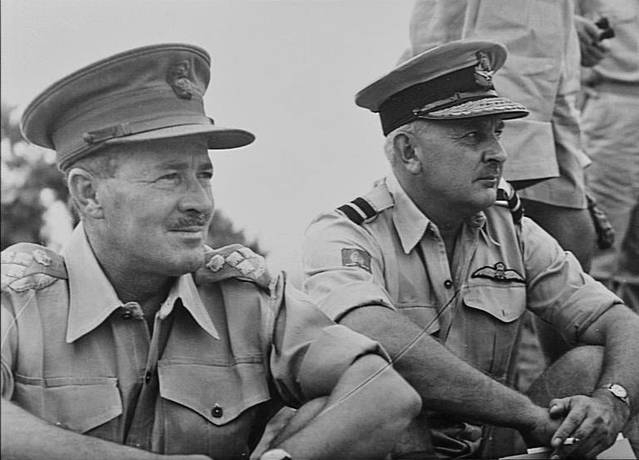
Brigadier Garrett (left) with Air Commodore Alan Charlesworth in Nagano, Japan, c. 1949

Following a three-month course at the Staff College, Camberley, Garrett was appointed commandant of the Staff College, Queenscliff, Victoria, in June 1946. He was posted to Japan in March 1947, becoming Brigadier-in-Charge of Administration for the British Commonwealth Occupation Force in July. The size and scope of the occupation declined considerably during his tour, which finished in October 1949. Approximately 2,400 Australians, most from the 67th Battalion, remained by late 1948, compared to 11,000 in October 1946. In December 1949, Garrett resumed command of the Staff College, Queenscliff. Promoted temporary major general, he was appointed General Officer Commanding (GOC) Western Command, which covered the state of Western Australia, in August 1951. He became Deputy Chief of the General Staff in February 1953.

In December 1953, Garrett succeeded Major General Eric Woodward as Adjutant-General and Second Military Member of the Military Board. He was promoted temporary lieutenant general in October 1954 and appointed GOC Southern Command, which was headquartered in Melbourne and controlled, as of April 1953, several major Citizen Military Forces (CMF) formations including the 3rd Infantry Division, the 4th and 6th Infantry Brigades, the 2nd Armoured Brigade, and two artillery groups. His elevation to lieutenant general was made permanent in December 1954. Garrett was appointed a Companion of the Order of the Bath in the Queen's Birthday Honours on 13 June 1957. He succeeded Lieutenant General Sir Henry Wells as Chief of the General Staff (CGS) on 23 March 1958. Garrett was raised to Knight Commander of the Order of the British Empire in the 1959 New Year Honours.

The Army underwent significant change during Garrett's term as CGS. In March 1959, he chaired the first meeting of the Military Board at the new Army Headquarters in Canberra, following its move from Melbourne. Alan Stretton, executive officer to the Military Board at the time, recalled Garrett's sense of humour and "most informal" manner. In August, the CGS announced to his senior officers a radical reorganisation of the Army that would strengthen the regular forces and reduce reliance on the CMF, which since Federation had formed the backbone of Australia's military. This plan included the abolition of National Service, to which the Federal government had already agreed, and the introduction of a "pentropic" divisional structure. Garrett championed the pentropic structure to overcome what he saw as the weakness of the traditional battalion for overseas deployments, and to ensure compatibility with the US Army's pentomic formations. The Australian Army's traditional "triangular" divisional structure of three infantry battalions under a brigade headquarters was to be replaced with an organisation consisting of five larger battalions (hence "pentropic") without a brigade layer between division and battalion headquarters. The plan was opposed by CMF officers as it would result in the disbandment of the citizens' brigades and many of the old militia battalions. Under the new structure the CMF would not only shrink, its units would lose traditional ties to local communities through the establishment of new multi-battalion state-based regiments, leading to suspicion in some quarters that the entire process was designed to demolish the CMF.

In future, the Regular Army will be supported by the non-regular forces and not the reverse as at present.

— Lieutenant General Garrett, 22 December 1959

Garrett was concerned not only with changing the Army's organisation but with upgrading its equipment; by the early 1960s the Army would acquire the FN 7.62mm rifle, the M60 machine gun, the M101 105mm howitzer, the M113 armoured personnel carrier, and new mortars and radios. He also advocated strongly for the Army to operate its own helicopters and light aircraft; the Australian Army Aviation Corps was eventually established in July 1968. Garrett was scheduled to retire from the Army on his sixtieth birthday in February 1960 but the government extended his term. He retired on 30 June 1960 and was succeeded by Lieutenant General Reg Pollard, whom Garrett had recommended for the post in the face of opposition from the Minister for the Army, John Cramer, who had attempted to appoint Major General Ivan Dougherty, a retired CMF officer. Although Garrett's proposed reorganisation of the Army along pentropic lines went ahead under Pollard, it proved short-lived. The US Army abandoned the system in June 1961, and the Australian Army returned to the triangular formation following a review commissioned by Pollard's successor as CGS, Lieutenant General Sir John Wilton, in October 1964.

== Later life ==
On retiring from the military, Garrett became principal of the Australian Administrative Staff College, a private institution delivering courses to senior business and government personnel at Mount Eliza, Victoria. During his four-year tenure, he lobbied for the reintroduction of conscription, and when the Federal government brought in a new selective service scheme in 1965, he was invited to draw the first ballot of names. Garrett also recommended that the Army should have a division prepared for war at all times. He served as honorary colonel of the Royal Australian Regiment and the Royal Western Australia Regiment from 1960 until 1965, when he was appointed Chairman of the Western Australian Coastal Shipping Commission, a position he held until 1970. He died on 4 November 1977 at Mornington, Victoria, and was cremated. His wife had predeceased him.

== Notes ==
Military offices
Preceded by Lieutenant General Sir Henry Wells	Chief of the General Staff; 1958–1960	Succeeded by Lieutenant General Sir Reg Pollard
Preceded by Lieutenant General Horace Robertson	General Officer Commanding Southern Command; 1954–1958	Succeeded by Lieutenant General Hector Edgar
