= Reg Pollard (general) =

Australian Army chief

Sir Reginald George Pollard
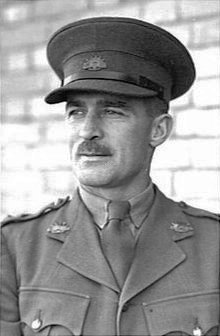
- Lieutenant Colonel Pollard in Cairo, February 1942
- Born: 20 January 1903; Bathurst, New South Wales
- Died: 9 March 1978 (aged 75); Wyrallah, New South Wales
- Military career
- Allegiance: Australia
- Service/branch: Australian Army
- Service years: 1921–1963
- Rank: Lieutenant General
- Service number: 214 (NX70398)
- Commands: 2/31st Battalion (1941); Recruit Training Centre (1946); Australian Army Component BCOF (1953); Eastern Command (1957–1960); Chief of the General Staff (1960–1963)
- Conflicts: Second World War; Middle East theatre; Syrian campaign; South West Pacific theatre; New Guinea campaign; Korean War
- Awards: Knight Commander of the Royal Victorian Order; Knight Commander of the Order of the British Empire; Companion of the Order of the Bath; Distinguished Service Order; Mentioned in Despatches
- Other work: Australian Secretary to Elizabeth II (1970)

Lieutenant General Sir Reginald George Pollard, KCVO, KBE, CB, DSO (20 January 1903 – 9 March 1978) was a senior commander in the Australian Army. He served as Chief of the General Staff from 1960 to 1963.

Born in Bathurst, New South Wales, Pollard graduated from the Royal Military College, Duntroon, in 1924. A regular officer, he served as adjutant/quartermaster in several battalions of the Citizens Military Forces (CMF) during the 1920s and 1930s. In 1938, he was posted to England to undertake staff training, which was cut short by the outbreak of the Second World War. Pollard joined the Second Australian Imperial Force in 1940, and the following year saw action with the 7th Division in the Middle East, where he was mentioned in despatches. Promoted to colonel in 1942, he became senior staff officer of the 7th Division in New Guinea, and was awarded the Distinguished Service Order for his actions. He spent much of the remainder of the war in staff and training positions in Australia.

Pollard's early post-war roles involved recruit training, land/air warfare, administration, and planning. In 1953, he was promoted to brigadier and took command of the Australian Army Component of the British Commonwealth Forces Korea. He joined the Military Board as a major general in 1954, and was appointed a Commander of the Order of the British Empire the following year. In 1957 he was promoted to lieutenant general and took charge of Eastern Command in Sydney; two years later he was appointed a Companion of the Order of the Bath. Knighted in 1961, as Chief of the General Staff he presided over the Army's reorganisation as a pentropic structure, and worked towards making Duntroon a degree-granting institution. In 1962, he oversaw deployment of the first team of Australian military advisors to South Vietnam. After retiring from the military in 1963, Pollard became Honorary Colonel of the Royal Australian Regiment; he served as Australian Secretary to Queen Elizabeth II during the Royal Visit in 1970 and was appointed a Knight Commander of the Royal Victorian Order the same year. He died at Wyrallah, New South Wales, in 1978.

== Early life ==
Reginald George Pollard was born on 20 January 1903 in Bathurst, New South Wales, the third son of Albert Edgar Pollard, an English accountant, and his Australian wife Thalia Rebecca, née McLean. Schooled in Bathurst, Reg entered the Royal Military College, Duntroon, in 1921, and graduated with the Sword of Honour for "exemplary conduct and performance" in 1924. Pollard and fellow graduate Frederick Scherger, winner of the King's Medal and future air chief marshal, applied to transfer to the Royal Australian Air Force (RAAF) under a scheme designed to augment the RAAF's officer corps, but only Scherger was accepted. The previous year, Pollard and Scherger had inaugurated a Duntroon tradition when they found a horse's jawbone during a field exercise. Inspired by the Biblical tale in which Samson slays the Philistines with the jawbone of an ass, they declared their find a lucky charm and brought it back to the college as a mascot; it became known as "Enobesra" (reportedly because "jawbone seemed so commonplace, an arsebone sounded much more interesting and spelt backwards sounded both mysterious and respectable").

Ranked lieutenant in the Permanent Military Force (PMF), Pollard was appointed adjutant/quartermaster of the 17th Battalion (Citizens Military Forces), headquartered at North Sydney, in July 1925. He married Daisy Ethel Potter, a typist, at St Andrew's Anglican Church, Strathfield, on 31 October; The Bathurst Times reported that Daisy cut the cake with her husband's Sword of Honour. Pollard departed for India on attachment to the British Army in September 1927, serving with the Royal Fusiliers and the York and Lancaster Regiment. He returned to Sydney in November the following year and was posted as adjutant/quartermaster to, successively, the 18th Battalion (CMF) and, in September 1932, the 44th Battalion (CMF). That December, while serving with the 44th in Western Australia, he was promoted to captain. Pollard was camp commandant of the National Rifle Association of Western Australia from 1934 to 1936. He transferred to Army Headquarters, Melbourne, in October 1936. His next posting, in July 1938, was as General Staff Officer Grade 3, Training and General Duties, at the 2nd District Base, Sydney. In November 1938, Pollard travelled to England to attend Staff College, Camberley; he graduated in September 1939, the planned two-year course having been curtailed owing to the outbreak of the Second World War.

== Second World War ==
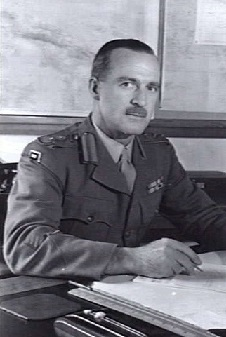
Colonel Pollard as deputy director of Military Operations, Melbourne, in December 1945

Following the declaration of war, Pollard served as Assistant Military Liaison Officer at the Australian High Commission, London; during this posting he spent two weeks attached to the British Expeditionary Force in France. Promoted major, he joined the Second Australian Imperial Force (AIF) in June 1940. The provisions of the Defence Act (1903) prohibited members of the PMF or the CMF fighting outside Australian territory except as volunteers in the AIF. Pollard was appointed brigade major of the 25th Brigade, an Australian infantry formation raised in England, mostly from logistics personnel, to help combat a possible invasion by Nazi Germany. The brigade became part of the Australian 9th Division, and in January 1941 sailed for the Middle East; it was transferred to the 7th Division on arrival.

In March 1941, Pollard was assigned to the 7th Division's headquarters staff in Libya under Lieutenant General John Lavarack. On 24 April, during the campaign in Cyrenaica, Pollard led a raiding party on Giarabub, Libya, to remove Senussi civilians and destroy wells and ammunition. He took command of the 2/31st Battalion at the end of June 1941, during the Syrian campaign, after the battalion's commanding officer, Lieutenant Colonel Selwyn Porter, was wounded. A cease-fire on 12 July ended the campaign in Syria, and Pollard was mentioned in despatches for his service; the award was gazetted on 30 December 1941. Pollard was promoted to lieutenant colonel in August 1941, and was responsible for establishing the AIF Junior Staff School in Palestine. He was raised to temporary colonel in March 1942 and posted to the AIF Staff in Ceylon, where the 16th and 17th Brigades had been garrisoned while on their way back to Australia from the Middle East.

Returning to Australia in August 1942, Pollard was appointed General Staff Officer Grade 1 of the 6th Division; he served on its headquarters in Papua from September until mid-November, when he became Major General George Vasey's senior staff officer at the 7th Division. Pollard received the Distinguished Service Order for his actions in operations at Gona and Sanananda, during which he "displayed unlimited energy and ascertained vital information for use in future operations"; the award was promulgated on 21 December 1943. At the conclusion of the Papuan campaign in January 1943, Pollard was posted to Queensland with the 6th Division, which was undergoing training and reinforcement. He was Chief Instructor of the Senior Staff School at Duntroon from December 1943 until February 1945, when he became deputy director of Military Operations at General Sir Thomas Blamey's Allied Land Forces Headquarters in Melbourne.

== Post-war career ==
=== Rise to Chief of the General Staff ===
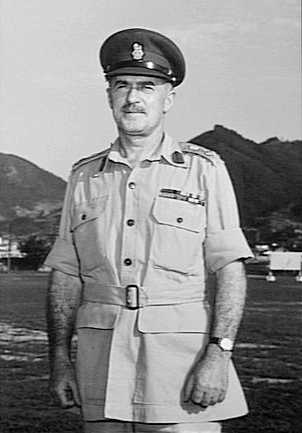
Brigadier Pollard as Commander of the Australian Army Component, British Commonwealth Forces Korea, July 1953

Pollard held command of the Army's Recruit Training Centre at Greta, New South Wales, from February to May 1946. He spent the next two months attached to the headquarters staff of Northern Command. In August he was posted to England to undertake a course at the Royal Air Force's School of Air Support in Old Sarum, and following his return in February 1947 was allotted to instruct at the soon-to-be-opened RAAF School of Air Support at Laverton, Victoria. It was redesignated the School of Land/Air Warfare in March 1948 and relocated to RAAF Station Williamtown, New South Wales. Pollard was appointed Director of Personnel Administration at Army Headquarters in January 1949. One of his tasks was to prepare the ground for the reintroduction of compulsory national service; the new scheme was enacted in 1951 and remained in force until 1959. Pollard's lieutenant-colonelcy had been made substantive in September 1946 and his colonelcy in July 1949. He attended the Imperial Defence College, London, throughout 1951; he served as aide-de-camp to King George VI from April that year until August 1952, and in the same capacity for Queen Elizabeth II until April 1954.

In January 1952, Pollard succeeded Colonel John Wilton as Director of Military Operations and Plans at Army Headquarters, and became Chairman of the Joint Planning Committee. That August he was one of the Australian delegates joining the Minister for External Affairs, Richard Casey, for the inaugural meeting of the ANZUS Council in Honolulu; the US and New Zealand delegations were led, respectively, by Secretary of State Dean Acheson and Minister for External Affairs Clifton Webb. Pollard also took part in planning for the atomic test at Montebello, Western Australia, in October 1952. Promoted to temporary brigadier in March 1953, Pollard acted as Australian military advisor to Prime Minister Robert Menzies at the Commonwealth Prime Ministers' Conference in London that June. From July to November he served as commander of the Australian Army Component of the British Commonwealth Forces Korea; the role was responsible for managing the turnover of Australian troops in the theatre and the upkeep of their personal records. Pollard was later appointed Deputy Adjutant General at Army Headquarters, and his rank of brigadier became substantive in December 1953.

In September 1954, Pollard was promoted to temporary major general and appointed Quartermaster General and Third Military Member of the Military Board. At fifty-two, he was the youngest member of the Board. His promotion to major general was made substantive in December 1954. Inspecting conditions for Australian troops deployed to Malaya in December 1955, Pollard was quoted as saying that there were "one or two" serious complaints but that he was "amazed how few there were, considering that the average soldier complains considerably all the time". In August 1957, he was promoted lieutenant general and succeeded Eric Woodward as General Officer Commanding Eastern Command, upon Woodward's appointment as Governor of New South Wales. Headquartered in Sydney, Eastern Command covered the state of New South Wales and was the superior headquarters for the 2nd Division (CMF). Pollard was appointed a Commander of the Order of the British Empire in the Queen's Birthday Honours promulgated on 9 June 1955, and a Companion of the Order of the Bath in the Birthday Honours promulgated on 13 June 1959.

=== Chief of the General Staff ===
On 1 July 1960, Pollard succeeded Lieutenant General Sir Ragnar Garrett as Chief of the General Staff (CGS), and was raised to Knight Commander of the Order of the British Empire in the Queen's Birthday Honours promulgated on 2 June 1961. Although favoured by Garrett, Pollard's succession had not been a foregone conclusion. The Minister for the Army, John Cramer, attempted to appoint Major General Ivan Dougherty, a retired CMF officer, but the proposal was defeated in cabinet on the advice of the Minister for Defence, Athol Townley, who feared the antagonism it was likely to engender among the senior ranks of the Regular Army.

As CGS, Pollard oversaw a major restructure of the Army. Following the lead of the US military, in 1960 the Australian Army replaced its "triangular" divisional structure of three infantry battalions under brigade headquarters, with a "pentropic" organisation consisting of five larger battalions without a brigade layer between division and battalion headquarters. The reorganisation had been sponsored by Garrett and agreed to by Townley in December 1959. According to historian Chris Clark, Pollard was "personally ambivalent" about the change, which was intended to rationalise resources and strengthen the battalions for overseas deployments but also resulted in the disbandment of the citizens' brigades and many other militia units. The US in any case abandoned the pentropic system in June 1961, and the Australian Army ultimately returned to the triangular formation following a review commissioned by Pollard's successor as CGS, Lieutenant General Wilton, in October 1964. Another of Pollard's focus areas as CGS was the academic qualifications of Army officers. Concerned that Duntroon graduates would begin to fall behind their tertiary-educated peers in the community, he worked to make the college a degree-granting institution, though this did not come to fruition until 1968.

In December 1961, Pollard told the Secretary of the Defence Committee that he considered the Army's strength inadequate to support the government's policy of "forward defence", which involved meeting Communist aggression in South East Asia, well away from the Australian mainland. The CMF, he contended, was not properly equipped to provide relief for regular forces deployed overseas, and conscription "would appear to be politically and economically out of the question". Nevertheless, the government reintroduced conscription in 1964. As the threat of South Vietnam falling to a Communist takeover became more apparent, the Army began in 1962 to exercise specifically to combat counter-insurgency operations, a type of warfare Pollard characterised as "frustrating groping at an elusive enemy"; he added that "no purely military solution to a Communist insurgency situation is possible". In May that year, the Federal government agreed to South Vietnam's request for military instructors; Pollard was responsible for laying down guidelines for the thirty advisors deployed in August as part of the Australian Army Training Team Vietnam, led by his friend Colonel Ted Serong.

== Retirement ==
Upon reaching the mandatory retirement age of sixty, Pollard left the military on 20 January 1963, having recommended Wilton as his successor. He became a grazier on a farm at Wesburn, Victoria. In July 1965, he was made Honorary Colonel (later Colonel Commandant) of the Royal Australian Regiment, in which capacity he visited Australian troops in South Vietnam. He served as Australian Secretary to Queen Elizabeth II for the Royal Visit in 1970, and was appointed a Knight Commander of the Royal Victorian Order in recognition of his services; the honour was promulgated on 29 May 1970, backdated to 3 May. In 1974, he moved to a new property, which he christened Duntroon, at Wyrallah, New South Wales. Pollard died suddenly at his Wyrallah home on 9 March 1978, aged 75. He was survived by his wife and two sons, and cremated.

== Notes ==
Military offices
Preceded by Lieutenant General Sir Ragnar Garrett	Chief of the General Staff; 1960–1963	Succeeded by Lieutenant General Sir John Wilton
Preceded by Lieutenant General Eric Woodward	General Officer Commanding Eastern Command; 1957–1960	Succeeded by Lieutenant General Hector Edgar
