= Reg Pollard =

Reg Pollard may refer to:

- Reg Pollard (politician) (1894–1981), Australian politician
- Sir Reg Pollard (general) (1903–1978), Australian general
