= Henry Wells (general) =

Australian Army officer (1898–1973)

Sir Henry Wells
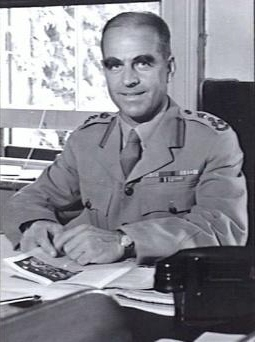
- Brigadier Henry Wells c. 1945
- Born: 22 March 1898; Kyneton, Victoria
- Died: 20 October 1973 (aged 75); Yarrawonga, Victoria
- Military career
- Allegiance: Australia
- Branch: Australian Army
- Service years: 1916–1959
- Rank: Lieutenant General
- Nickname: "Bomba"
- Commands: Chairman, Chiefs of Staff Committee (1958–59); Chief of the General Staff (1954–58); British Commonwealth Forces Korea (1953–54); Southern Command (1951–53); Royal Military College, Duntroon (1949–51)
- Conflicts: Second World War; Battle of Greece; North African Campaign; Syria-Lebanon Campaign; First Battle of El Alamein; Second Battle of El Alamein; South West Pacific theatre; New Guinea Campaign; Borneo campaign; Korean War; Malayan Emergency
- Awards: Knight Commander of the Order of the British Empire; Companion of the Order of the Bath; Distinguished Service Order; Mentioned in Despatches (3); Commander of the Legion of Merit (United States)
- Other work: Honorary Colonel of the Royal Victoria Regiment; Businessman

Lieutenant General Sir Henry Wells, KBE, CB, DSO (22 March 1898 – 20 October 1973) was a senior officer in the Australian Army. Serving as Chief of the General Staff from 1954 to 1958, Wells' career culminated with his appointment as the first Chairman, Chiefs of Staff Committee, a position marking him as the professional head of the Australian Military. He served in this capacity from March 1958 until March 1959, when he retired from the army.

Born in Victoria, Wells began his career in the Australian Army in 1916 when he entered the Royal Military College, Duntroon. Graduating as a lieutenant three years later, he served in a variety of staff and instructional positions before the outbreak of the Second World War. Initially posted to the 7th Division as a staff officer in 1940, Wells was promoted to lieutenant colonel and made senior liaison officer to I Corps. Serving in Greece and North Africa, he was awarded the Distinguished Service Order for his leadership at El Alamein. Transferred to the South West Pacific theatre in 1943 as a brigadier, he served in the New Guinea Campaign with the headquarters of II Corps and later in the Borneo campaign with I Corps.

Wells was promoted to major general in 1946 and appointed Deputy Chief of the General Staff. Following promotion to lieutenant general, he was made Commander-in-Chief, British Commonwealth Forces Korea from 1953 to 1954, serving during the last days of the war. In retirement, Wells was a director of several companies. Aged 75, he died in 1973.

== Early life and career ==
Wells was born in the Victorian town of Kyneton on 22 March 1898, the youngest of seven children to Arthur Wells, a draper, and his wife Elizabeth (née Carter). Educated at Kyneton High School, Wells entered the Royal Military College, Duntroon, in February 1916, where he was a keen sportsman. Graduating from the college in December 1919, he was commissioned as a lieutenant in the Australian Army, and posted to England for further training.

On his return to Australia, Wells was appointed as adjutant and quartermaster of the 8th Light Horse Regiment in 1921. The following year, he was allocated to the 9th Light Horse Regiment. In February 1926, Wells was briefly appointed brigade major of the 6th Cavalry Brigade, before becoming an instructor at the Small Arms School, Sydney, during July. On 14 December that year, Wells married Lorna Irene Skippen in a ceremony at St John's Church of England, Cessnock; the couple would later have two sons.

During 1927, Wells was assigned to the Royal Military College, Duntroon as a company commander and promoted to captain that December. Returning to the Small Arms School as an instructor in 1931, he was dispatched to England and attended the Staff College, Camberley between 1935 and 1936. Arriving back in Australia, Wells was made adjutant and quartermaster of the 4th/3rd Battalion, and later brigade major of the 1st Infantry Brigade. During 1938, he was reposted to Royal Military College, Duntroon as a lecturer on tactics.

== Second World War ==
=== Greece and North Africa ===
On 15 May 1940, Wells transferred to the Second Australian Imperial Force for active service during the Second World War. Promoted to major, he was posted to the headquarters of the 7th Division. Wells proceeded with the division to the Middle East, where, on arriving in December, he was promoted to lieutenant colonel and posted as senior liaison officer to I Corps. During this time, the Australian 6th Division and I Corps Headquarters were diverted for service in the Greek Campaign.

Wells arrived in Greece on 7 March 1941, with an advance party of Lieutenant General Sir Thomas Blamey's I Corps staff. On 10 April, a plan was formulated to withdraw Greek and Commonwealth troops from their positions in the Verria pass of the Vermion Mountains to the River Aliakmon. To carry this out, Blamey despatched Wells to coordinate the movement of the 12th Greek Division west to its new position. The withdrawal began on 12 April, but the force's movement was hampered because of lack of vehicles and the division did not arrive until late evening the following day. During this time, Wells travelled between I Corps Headquarters and the 12th Greek Division, organising and coordinating the division's movement, despite frequent air attacks on the roads.

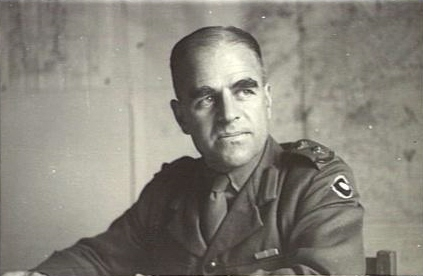
Colonel Henry Wells, GSO1 9th Division c. March 1942

On 24 April 1941, Wells embarked from Greece along with the remainder of the I Corps Headquarters during the British and Commonwealth withdrawal. Commended for his "conspicuous skill, ability and energy" and fostering "mutual confidence and goodwill between the Allied forces", Wells was recommended for the Distinguished Service Order, but was subsequently appointed an Officer of the Order of the British Empire for his services in Greece. The announcement of the award was published in a supplement to the London Gazette on 30 December 1941. Then Brigadier Stanley Savige later wrote of Wells during the campaign: "Tireless in his long journeys, helpful in every possible way, and courageous in all circumstances". For his "gallant and distinguished services" during this time, Wells was additionally Mentioned in Despatches.

Following Greece, the headquarters of I Corps returned to Palestine. Wells was made General Staff Officer, 2nd Grade (GSO2), the deputy chief of staff in charge of planning operations. I Corps was alerted to take part in the Syria-Lebanon Campaign, in spite of the fact that since Blamey had been promoted to Deputy Commander in Chief Middle East Command, the corps lacked a commanding officer. General Sir Henry Maitland Wilson—the British commander in Palestine and Transjordan—believed that I Corps' loss of transport and signal equipment precluded it from participating in the campaign from the outset. Instead, Wilson attempted to exercise command from the King David Hotel. This proved to be a serious error, as his staff were preoccupied with political and administrative issues, and were too remote from the battlefields to exercise the close command required. Following a series of reverses, I Corps headquarters was sent for on 18 June, and Lieutenant General John Lavarack assumed command that day. The headquarters was confronted by a difficult situation, with almost all reserves committed. Lavarack began regrouping his force, concentrating the 7th Division for a decisive thrust towards Beirut. Hard fighting was required before the campaign was brought to a successful conclusion.

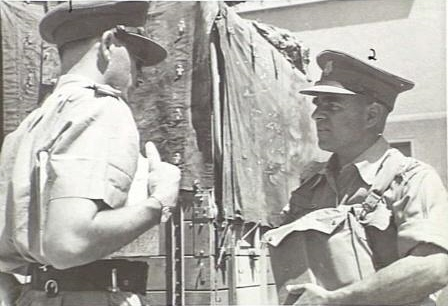
Colonel Henry Wells (right) converses with a captain during a respirator and gas drill at the 9th Australian Division's Headquarters in Tripoli, Syria.

Promoted to colonel, Wells became General Staff Officer, 1st Grade (GSO1), to the 9th Division in November 1941. As such, he was the 9th Division's chief of staff, responsible for the full range of staff activities. On 28 June 1942, Wells accompanied Lieutenant General Sir Leslie Morshead—Commander of the 9th Division—to Cairo, where they received orders tasking the 9th Division with the defence of Cairo. The pair spent that night and the following day organising plans for the move, before Morshead received further orders on 30 June cancelling his previous instructions and directing the division instead be dispatched to Alexandria; the move took place on 1 July. Two days later, it was decided that the 24th Infantry Brigade would be sent forward to reinforce the position at El Alamein. The brigade was lacking in equipment, and Wells spent that day arranging equipment for the unit as well as overseeing its preparation; the brigade moved forward the next day. The divisional headquarters proceeded to El Alamein on 7 July, and was posted to the northern flank of the British front line. The unit then spent the remainder of the month in action against Axis forces in the area. For his "distinguished services" during this period, Wells was Mentioned in Despatches a second time.

On 23 October 1942, the British and Commonwealth forces under Lieutenant General Bernard Montgomery launched an offensive against Axis forces at El Alamein. The 9th Division took part in the battle, and was initially tasked with the seizure of a section of the Oxalic Line. Over the proceeding twelve days, the Australians heavily contributed to the assault, with Morshead and his staff coordinating the 9th Division's operations; success was claimed on 4 November. Praised for his "ability of high order", Wells was awarded the Distinguished Service Order for his efforts in training and preparing the division before the battle, in addition to his labours during the engagement. The notification for the decoration was published in a supplement to the London Gazette on 11 February 1943.

In late November 1942, the members of the 9th Division returned to Palestine. In January, the unit embarked from North Africa and sailed home to Australia in preparation for service against the Japanese in the South West Pacific.

=== South West Pacific ===
Wells arrived back in Australia during February 1943. On 15 March, Morshead was appointed to command II Corps, and Wells was transferred along with him to the unit's headquarters as Brigadier, General Staff. He was promoted to temporary brigadier in April. During this time, the combat forces of the corps undertook training in both jungle and amphibious warfare in preparation for its planned deployment to New Guinea. Wells took an active hand in organising these exercises, before he moved with the corps headquarters to New Guinea during October.

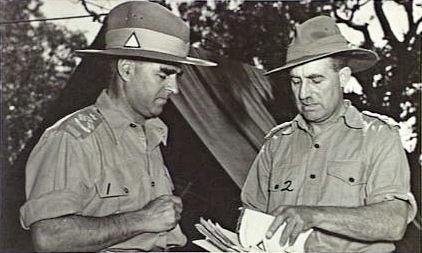
Brigadiers Henry Wells and John Broadbent conferring during a staff and command course, Queensland c. 1944.

The movement of II Corps coincided with the vicious fighting around the Huon Peninsula and Finisterre Range. Wells assisted in the planning and coordination of operations over the subsequent months, which culminated in the seizure of Madang during April 1944. Wells was awarded his third Mention in Despatches during this time for his "exceptional services in the field".

In April 1944, II Corps was redesignated as I Corps and returned to Australia, where it established itself on the Atherton Tableland in Queensland. The following month, Wells proceeded to Land Command Headquarters in Sydney, where he attended a conference on staff appointments. He returned to the corps eleven days later. During this period, Wells was once again active in organising the unit's training off the Queensland coast, before he was granted a period of leave during August; he returned to duty on 26 September. On 19 July 1945, Wells was upgraded to a Commander of the Order of the British Empire for his "exceptional ability and outstanding devotion to duty" in conjunction with the "valuable assistance" given throughout the New Guinea campaign to the General Officer Commanding New Guinea Force.

During March 1945, Wells acted as one of the eight pallbearers for Major General George Alan Vasey at the latter's funeral. Vasey had been killed in a plane crash just off the coast of Cairns, while en route to assume command of the 6th Division in New Guinea. That same month, it was decided that I Corps would lead an assault against the island of Borneo. As a consequence, headquarters of I Corps moved to Morotai, where it opened on 24 April. The initial Borneo landings took place on 1 May, with the Australian force in action at Tarakan. Over the proceeding engagements, Wells assisted in the organisation and implementation of the operations in Borneo. As the war drew to a close in September 1945, Wells returned to Australia and was posted to Army Headquarters in Melbourne.

== Senior command ==
In March 1946, Wells was briefly posted as director of military operations at Army Headquarters, before being promoted to temporary major general and appointed Deputy Chief of the General Staff. The following year, he embarked for the United Kingdom where he attended the Imperial Defence College in London. During this time, Wells attended an investiture ceremony at Buckingham Palace, where he was presented with his Commander of the Order of the British Empire by King George VI. On his return to Australia in 1949, Wells was made Commandant of the Royal Military College, Duntroon. He served in this position until February 1951, when he was appointed General Officer Commanding Southern Command with the rank of temporary lieutenant general. In June of that year, Wells acted as one of the ten pallbearers to Field Marshal Sir Thomas Blamey at his state funeral in Melbourne.

Lieutenant General Wells inspects the guard of the 2nd Battalion, Royal Australian Regiment on his arrival in Malaya c. 1956.

Wells was appointed Commander-in-Chief, British Commonwealth Forces Korea, in 1953. Assuming the role on 11 February, he led the Commonwealth contingent for the next twenty-one months as the Korean War was coming to an end. Like his predecessors in the position, Wells exercised administrative command only, and had no direct control over battlefield operations. Though its incumbents were considered to have performed well, the role garnered little credit for helping facilitate combat success but was a soft target for criticism when operations did not run smoothly. Wells had been sent to Korea with no instructions regarding the withdrawal of troops and—as armistice talks appeared on the verge of success—he was closely involved in liaison with the heads of Commonwealth governments regarding General Mark Clark's requests for their commitment to retain forces in the theatre for some period following the end of hostilities.

Raised to substantive lieutenant general on 12 April 1954, Wells was appointed a Companion of the Order of the Bath in the Queen's Birthday Honours that June. He was commended for his "exceptional meritorious service" in Korea, and awarded the United States' Legion of Merit in the degree of Commander. Presented with the decoration by General John E. Hull on 19 October, Wells returned to Australia three days later. In December, he was made Chief of the General Staff; the professional head of the Australian Army. Wells' appointment coincided with the commitment of Australian forces to the Malayan Emergency, and as such he presided over the deployment of soldiers to the engagement as well as the formation of the first regular brigade group. He was upgraded to a Knight Commander of the Order of the British Empire in the 1956 New Years Honours.

On 23 March 1958, Wells was appointed the first Chairman, Chiefs of Staff Committee (COSC); the professional head of the Australian Military. The position had previously existed as an extension to the responsibilities of the senior service chief—either the Chief of Naval Staff, Chief of the General Staff or Chief of the Air Staff—but Wells was the first to occupy the position as a separate post. The chairmanship of COSC was created as part of the Australian government's response to a review of the Defence group of departments conducted by Lieutenant General Sir Leslie Morshead in 1957, which recommended greater centralisation of the armed forces. Although the chairman was the Government's principal military advisor and reported directly to the Minister for Defence, Wells was not promoted and remained at the same rank as the heads of the Navy, Army and Air Force. He was also hampered by being given only a small staff. The role of the Chairman, COSC was not strengthened until 1965, when Air Marshal Sir Frederick Scherger—who had been appointed to the position in 1961—was promoted to air chief marshal so that he out-ranked the service heads. Wells served in this capacity until his retirement from the Australian military on 22 March 1959.

== Retirement ==
In retirement, Wells was appointed as a director to several companies, including Broken Hill South Ltd, Metal Manufactures Ltd, Navcot Australia Pty Ltd and Sitmar Line (Australia) Pty Ltd. In April 1961, Wells was appointed honorary colonel of the Royal Victoria Regiment. Described as "somewhat reserved and taciturn" during his life, Wells died at Yarrawonga, Victoria, on 20 October 1973, and was survived by his wife and their two sons. His funeral service took place with full military honours at Toorak Presbyterian Church, after which he was cremated. In his will, Wells bequeathed a sizable proportion of his estate to Junior Legacy, Melbourne. Wells Road, a street in Duntroon, Australian Capital Territory, is named in his honour.

== Notes ==
Military offices
New title	Chairman, Chiefs of Staff Committee; 1958–1959	Succeeded by Vice Admiral Sir Roy Dowling
Preceded by Lieutenant General Sir Sydney Rowell	Chief of the General Staff; 1954–1958	Succeeded by Lieutenant General Sir Ragnar Garrett
Preceded by Lieutenant General William Bridgeford	C-in-C British Commonwealth Forces Korea; 1953–1954	Succeeded by Lieutenant General Rudolph Bierwirth
Preceded by Brigadier Eric Vowles	Commandant of the Royal Military College, Duntroon; 1949–1951	Succeeded by Major General Ronald Hopkins
