= Eric Woodward =

Governor of New South Wales from 1957 to 1965

Lieutenant General Sir Eric Woodward KCMG, KCVO, CB, CBE, DSO, KStJ
- Sir Eric Woodward c. 1959

31st Governor of New South Wales
- In office 1 August 1957 – 1 August 1965
- Monarch: Elizabeth II
- Premier: Joseph Cahill (1957–1959); Bob Heffron (1959–1964); Jack Renshaw (1964–1965); Robert Askin (1965)
- Lieutenant: Sir Kenneth Street
- Preceded by: Sir John Northcott
- Succeeded by: Sir Roden Cutler

Personal details
- Born: 21 July 1899 Hay, New South Wales
- Died: 29 December 1967 (aged 68) Sydney, New South Wales
- Resting place: Northern Suburbs Memorial Gardens
- Spouse: Amy Weller
- Children: 2 (including Sir Albert Edward Woodward)
- Civilian awards: Knight Commander of the Order of St Michael and St George; Knight Commander of the Royal Victorian Order

Military service
- Allegiance: Australia
- Branch/service: Australian Army (1917–1925, 1928–1957); Royal Australian Air Force (1925–1928)
- Years of service: 1917–1957
- Rank: Lieutenant General
- Commands: Eastern Command (1953–1957); Deputy Chief of the General Staff (1951)
- Battles/wars: Second World War; North African campaign; Operation Compass; Battle of Greece; Syria-Lebanon campaign; South West Pacific theatre
- Military awards: Companion of the Order of the Bath; Commander of the Order of the British Empire; Distinguished Service Order; Mentioned in Despatches (2)

Lieutenant General Sir Eric Winslow Woodward KCMG, KCVO, CB, CBE, DSO, KStJ (21 July 1899 – 29 December 1967) was an Australian military officer and viceroy. Following long service in the Australian Army, including terms as Deputy Chief of the General Staff and General Officer Commanding Eastern Command, he was appointed as the Governor of New South Wales from 1957 to 1965, thus becoming the first New South Welshman to be governor of the state.

== Early life ==
Woodward was born in Hay, New South Wales in July 1899, the third son of Victorian-born parents Albert William Woodward, a cattle station manager, and his wife Marie Woodward, née Reid. He and attended Toowoomba Grammar School. At school he did well academically, becoming Captain of the swimming team and playing in the First XV Rugby Team. However, due to his family's financial concerns, he was unable to attend university. Therefore, in 1917 he entered the Royal Military College, Duntroon. He graduated and was commissioned a lieutenant on 16 December 1920. Woodward first served twelve months with the 7th Queen's Own Hussars of the British Army in India from 1921 to 1922.

Following this service Woodward returned to Australia and, in 1925, he transferred to the Royal Australian Air Force (RAAF) and qualified as a pilot at No. 1 Flying Training School in Point Cook, Victoria. On 7 February 1927, in Melbourne, he married his cousin Amy Weller. Despite his apparent success as a pilot, he reverted to the army service in 1928. In December 1928, he was promoted to captain and became adjutant and quartermaster of the 19th Light Horse Regiment (1928–1929), and of the 4th Light Horse Regiment (1929–1934) before being posted to the Directorate of Military Training, Melbourne. In January 1937 he was sent to the Staff College, Camberley in England.

== Second World War ==
Following the outbreak of the Second World War in 1939, Woodward joined the Second Australian Imperial Force as Deputy Assistant Quartermaster-General for the 6th Division, and left for the Middle East in April 1940. In the Middle East he gained distinction during the North African campaign from December 1940 to January 1941 and was invested as an Officer of the Order of the British Empire on 8 July 1941. He served in the Greece Campaign from March to April 1941 as a lieutenant colonel on General Sir Thomas Blamey's staff and later served in the I Corps in the Syrian campaign. In May 1942 he was posted to the 9th Division. He fought in both the First and Second Battles of El Alamein and was awarded the Distinguished Service Order on 11 February 1943. He was twice mentioned in despatches for his work in the Middle East.

Arriving back in Australia in February 1943, in March Woodward was promoted to the rank of brigadier and was posted to the headquarters of the Northern Territory Force until December 1943. He then served in various administrative positions until the end of the war. From July 1945 to March 1946 he was appointed deputy adjutant and quartermaster-general, at headquarters on Morotai.

== Post-war career ==
In 1948 Woodward attended the Imperial Defence College and remained in London as Australian Army representative for the High Commission of Australia in London. In December 1949 he was at Army Headquarters in Melbourne and implemented the new National Service scheme, and fought for improvements in soldiers' pay and conditions. In 1950 and 1951 he reported directly to Prime Minister Robert Menzies as head of a special staff which planned counter-measures in the event of the government's attempt to ban the Communist Party of Australia leading to industrial unrest. On 20 February 1951 he was promoted to temporary major general and made Deputy Chief of the General Staff. Weary of involvement with bureaucrats, he requested not be put forward as a candidate for Chief of the General Staff. In 1952 he was invested as a Commander of the Order of the British Empire. Appointed General Officer Commanding Eastern Command in December 1953, he was elevated to the same role his great-grandfather Charles William Wall had held from 1823 to 1825. He was invested as a Companion of the Order of the Bath in 1956. Woodward was further promoted as a lieutenant general in December 1953.

== Governor of New South Wales ==
When Sir John Northcott's term as Governor of New South Wales drew to a close, the Premier Joseph Cahill sought another Australian-born military officer to succeed him and chose Woodward, who assumed office on 1 August 1957. The thirty-first governor of New South Wales, he was the first to have been born in the state. As governor he was invested as a Knight Commander of the Order of St Michael and St George in 1958 and a Knight Commander of the Royal Victorian Order in 1963. For part of his term in office, as the longest-serving governor, he acted as Administrator of the Commonwealth of Australia from 16 June to 30 August 1964 in the absence of the Governor-General of Australia, Lord De L'Isle.

In recognition of his service as governor, Woodward was awarded honorary doctorates by various universities, including an honorary Doctor of Science (Hon.DSc) from the University of New South Wales (1958), an honorary Doctor of Letters (Hon.DLitt) on 29 April 1959 by the University of Sydney and New England (1961).

The St. George Greek Orthodox parish in Rose Bay, Sydney was dedicated as a War Memorial by Woodward on 25 November 1962. On 30 June 1961, he officially opened Vaucluse Boys' High School. He laid the foundation for International House, University of New South Wales on 13 February 1965. Woodward retired on 31 July 1965 and he and his wife moved to Wahroonga.

== Death and legacy ==
Woodward died on 29 December 1967 at Royal Prince Alfred Hospital, Camperdown and was given a state funeral with full military honours. Lady Woodward survived him, as did their daughter and son, Sir Edward Woodward, who became a Judge of the Federal Court of Australia. He was cremated with his ashes interred at Northern Suburbs Memorial Gardens, North Ryde.

The Sir Eric Woodward Memorial School for children with intellectual and physical disabilities was established in 1971 and named in his honour. In 1970, the Public Transport Commission in charge of Sydney Ferries commissioned a new ship for the "Lady class" of ferries. Launched at the New South Wales State Dockyard in Newcastle in 1970, it was named the "Lady Woodward" to commemorate their service in office. The Lady Woodward was sold in 1993 and now operates as a privately owned craft in Tin Can Bay, Queensland.

== Honours ==
Viceregal styles of Sir Eric Woodward
- Reference style: His Excellency
- Spoken style: Your Excellency

Knight Commander of the Order of St Michael and St George (KCMG)	1958
Knight Commander of the Royal Victorian Order (KCVO)	1963
Companion of the Order of the Bath (CB)	1956
Commander of the Order of the British Empire (CBE)	1952
Officer of the Order of the British Empire (OBE)	1941
Companion of the Distinguished Service Order (DSO)	1943
Knight of Justice of the Venerable Order of St John of Jerusalem (KStJ)	1958
1939–45 Star	
Africa Star	
Pacific Star	
Defence Medal	
War Medal 1939–1945 with palm for Mentioned in Dispatches	
Australia Service Medal 1939–1945	
King George VI Coronation Medal	1937
Queen Elizabeth II Coronation Medal	1953

=== Honorary military appointments ===
- 14 August 1958 – 19 January 1966: Honorary Air Commodore of No. 22 Squadron, Royal Australian Air Force.

=== Honorary degrees ===
- In 1958, he was awarded a Doctor of Science (honoris causa) (Hon.DSc) by the University of New South Wales.
- (New South Wales) On 29 April 1959, he was awarded a Doctor of Letters (honoris causa) (Hon.DLitt) of the University of Sydney.
- (New South Wales) In 1961, he was admitted as an Honorary Doctor of Letters (Hon.DLitt) by the University of New England.

Military offices
Preceded by Ronald Hopkins	Deputy Chief of the General Staff; 1951–1953	Succeeded by Ragnar Garrett
Preceded by Frank Berryman	GOC Eastern Command; 1954–1957	Succeeded by Reg Pollard
Government offices
Preceded by Sir John Northcott	Governor of New South Wales; 1957–1965	Succeeded by Sir Roden Cutler
