= Rudolph Bierwirth =

Australian Army general

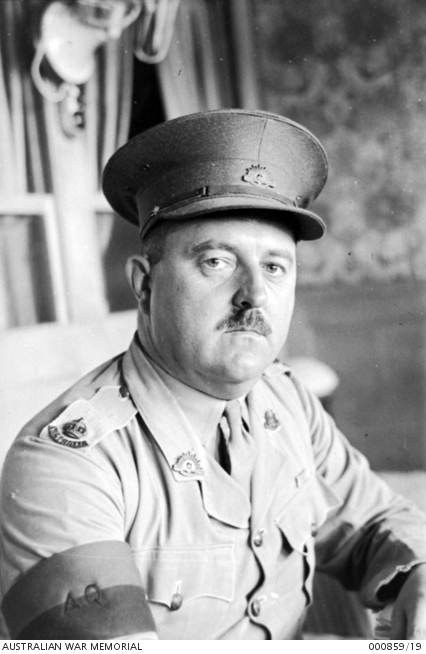
- Major Rudolph Bierwirth c. 1940
- Born: 30 January 1899; Adelaide, South Australia
- Died: 27 November 1993 (aged 94)
- Military career
- Allegiance: Australia
- Branch: Australian Army
- Service years: 1915–1956
- Rank: Lieutenant General
- Commands: British Commonwealth Forces Korea (1954–56); 2/33rd Battalion (1940–41)
- Conflicts: Second World War; North African Campaign; South West Pacific theatre; New Guinea campaign
- Awards: Commander of the Order of the British Empire; Mentioned in Despatches (2)

Lieutenant General Rudolph Bierwirth, CBE (30 January 1899 – 27 November 1993) was career officer in the Australian Army who served in many senior positions, and rose to General Officer rank in the 1950s.

== Early life and military career ==
Born in Adelaide, South Australia, Bierwirth entered the Royal Military College, Duntroon in 1915, was commissioned in 1918, appointed Brigade major to the 6th Brigade in 1927, and was made substantive major in 1937. He joined the 2nd Australian Imperial Force following the outbreak of the Second World War and served in the Middle East. He was promoted lieutenant colonel and made commanding officer of the 72nd Battalion, later to be redesignated as 2/33rd Battalion, in 1940.

Bierwirth was appointed an Officer of the Order of the British Empire in 1942, and returned to Australia later that year, where he was appointed temporary brigadier in charge – Administration Northern Territory Force/Headquarters 12th Division.

Bierwirth was promoted to substantive lieutenant colonel in the Australian Staff Corps in May 1943 prior to arriving in New Guinea and serving as Deputy adjutant quartermaster general Headquarters 1 Australian Corps and New Guinea Force. After a period in Townsville, he returned to Lae, followed by periods in Townsville, Madang, Bouganville, and Lae, rising to brigadier, before returning to Cairns in May 1945.

From 1945 to 1950 he served Bierwirth a number of positions in Europe and the United Kingdom, was Honorary aide de camp to the Governor-General of Australia, and quartermaster general. At the end of 1950 he was promoted to temporary major general, a rank that became substantive in 1952.

Bierwirth was promoted to temporary lieutenant general in 1954, serving as Commander in Charge British Commonwealth Forces Korea from 1954 to 1956. He retired in 1956, and died in 1993.

Military offices
Preceded by Lieutenant General Henry Wells	Commander-in-Chief British Commonwealth Forces Korea; 1954–1956	Succeeded by Brigadier Leonard Bruton
