= William Bridgeford =

Australian general

Sir William Bridgeford
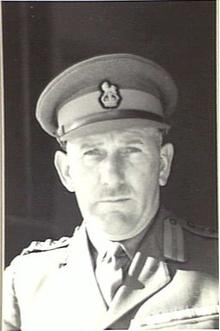
- Bridgeford in 1941 shortly after his involvement in the campaign in Greece
- Born: 28 July 1894; Smeaton, Victoria
- Died: 21 September 1971 (aged 77); Kenmore, Queensland
- Military career
- Allegiance: Australia
- Branch: Australian Army
- Service years: 1913–1953
- Rank: Lieutenant General
- Commands: British Commonwealth Forces Korea (1951–53); Eastern Command (1951); 3rd Infantry Division (1944–45); 3rd Armoured Division (1943); 25th Brigade (1940)
- Conflicts: First World War; Battle of Fromelles; Battle of Polygon Wood; Battle of the Hindenburg Line; Second World War; Battle of Greece; New Guinea Campaign; Bougainville campaign; Occupation of Japan; Korean War
- Awards: Knight Commander of the Order of the British Empire; Companion of the Order of the Bath; Military Cross; Mentioned in Despatches (4); War Cross (Greece); Legion of Merit (United States)
- Other work: Olympics organiser

Lieutenant General Sir William Bridgeford, KBE, CB, MC (28 July 1894 – 21 September 1971) was a senior officer in the Australian Army. He began his military career in 1913 and fought on the Western Front during the First World War, before rising to command the 3rd Infantry Division during the Bougainville campaign in the Second World War. Later he served as the Commander in Chief of British Commonwealth Forces Korea during the Korean War. He retired from the military in 1953 and worked on the organising committee of the 1956 Melbourne Olympic Games, as well as being the director of several companies and treasurer of a returned services organisation.

== Early life ==
William Bridgeford was born on 28 July 1894 at Smeaton in Victoria to George Bridgeford, a Scottish-born baker, and his wife Christina Gordon (née Calder). After his formative schooling, he attended Ballarat High School.

== Military career ==
=== First World War ===
In 1913, Bridgeford was accepted into the Royal Military College, Duntroon. Although the course was four years long, he was graduated early in June 1915 with the rest of his class due to Australia's growing commitment to the First World War. (Note: Bridgeford was part of the third class to graduate from the College. Dennis 1995, p. 119.) He was commissioned as a lieutenant in the Permanent Military Force, but volunteered for overseas service with the Australian Imperial Force (AIF) the following month and was posted to the 29th Infantry Battalion in Egypt. He did not see action with them, for in February 1916 the machine gun sections of the 8th Infantry Brigade, of which the 29th Infantry Battalion was a part, were transferred to the brigade's newly formed 8th Machine Gun Company. In 1918 the 5th Division's machine gun companies became part of the 5th Machine Gun Battalion. Bridgeford served with the 8th Machine Gun Company on the Western Front, where he was awarded the Military Cross for his actions during the Battle of Fromelles and later undertook staff training at brigade and divisional level. In April 1918 he was gassed and subsequently evacuated but he returned to his unit in August and was promoted to temporary major the following month. After the armistice was signed in November 1918, Bridgeford worked as a staff officer before returning to Australia in early 1919.

=== Between the wars ===
Due to widescale reductions in the Army following the demobilisation process, Bridgeford reverted to his substantive rank of lieutenant in the Permanent Military Force, although he continued to hold his AIF rank as an honorary rank. In 1922 he married Phyllis Wallinea (née Frederico), with whom he would later have a son. He held a number of staff positions throughout the 1920s and 1930s, including a position on the staff at the Royal Military College, Duntroon in 1925–26. He attended the Staff College, Quetta in British India the following year. On returning to Australia, he undertook duties as an instructor and as a staff officer. In 1938 he attended the Imperial Defence College in London and upon the outbreak of the Second World War he was promoted to lieutenant colonel and served as the military liaison to the British government.

=== Second World War ===
He briefly commanded the 25th Infantry Brigade upon its formation in the United Kingdom in June 1940 before serving as the Deputy Adjutant and Quartermaster General (DA&QMG) of I Corps. For his work during the Greek campaign, he received the Greek Military Cross, 1st Class and was appointed a Commander of the Order of the British Empire. Later, he was promoted to temporary major general and served as DA&QMG of the First Army. Between April and August 1943 he commanded the 3rd Armoured Division before serving on the staff of New Guinea Force during the New Guinea campaign from August 1943 to June 1944. He was later invested as a Companion of the Order of the Bath for his work during this time.

In July 1944 he took command of the 3rd Infantry Division. Although it was his first field command, he subsequently led them successfully through the Bougainville campaign where he pursued an aggressive campaign against the Japanese until the end of the war, receiving four Mentions in Despatches.

=== Korean War ===
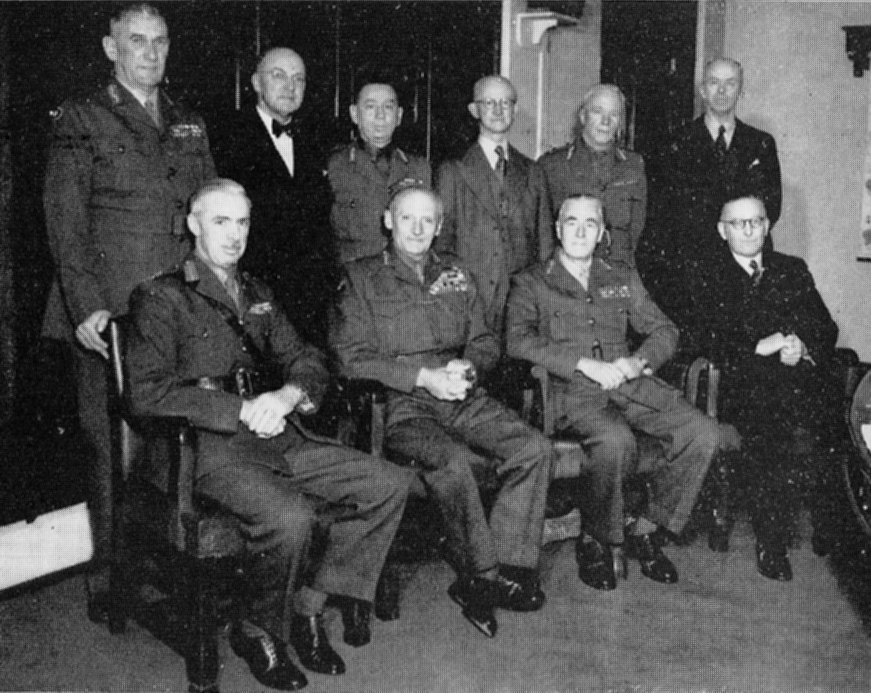
The Military Board in 1947, with Field Marshal Bernard Montgomery, 1st Viscount Montgomery of Alamein. Bridgeford is stood in the back on the left.

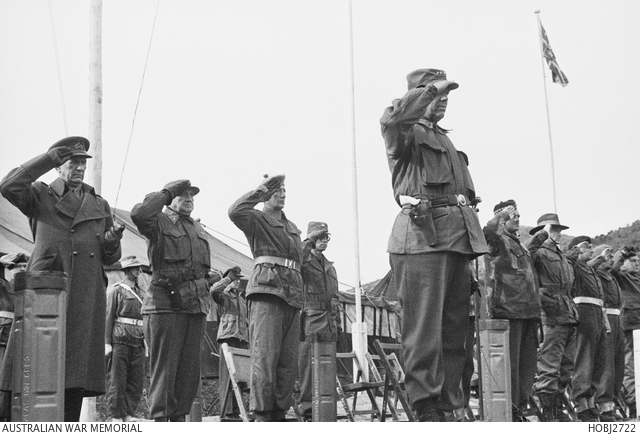
General James Van Fleet, commanding the U.S. Eighth Army (right), saluting the parade on the occasion of the bestowing of the Presidential Distinguished Unit Citation on members of the 3rd Battalion, Royal Australian Regiment. Lieutenant General W. Bridgeford (left) salutes in the background.

Following the end of the war, Bridgeford was confirmed as a major general and took up a position as quartermaster general of the Army and as a member of the Military Board.

In June 1950 he led an Australian mission to Malaya before being promoted to lieutenant general the following year and taking up the position of Commander-in-Chief of the British Commonwealth Occupation Force and the British Commonwealth Forces Korea, replacing Lieutenant General Sir Horace Robertson. For his services he was later awarded the Legion of Merit by the United States government. The role was a purely administrative one and Bridgeford had no control over combat operations, however, it was not without controversy. In May 1952 the Canadian government requested that he be relieved after he failed to consult them about deploying Canadian troops to guard prisoners of war at Koje-do. Bridgeford, however, retained his position as both the British and Australian governments supported him, and he stayed on until February 1953, when he was replaced by Lieutenant General Henry Wells.

He returned to Australia and retired from the military a month later with the honorary rank of lieutenant general.

== Later life ==
Following his retirement from the Army, Bridgeford worked as the chief executive officer of the organising committee of the 1956 Melbourne Olympic Games, for which he was later appointed a Knight Commander of the Order of the British Empire. He also served as the director of a number of companies, including a television company, and was actively involved with the Returned Sailors', Soldiers' and Airmen's Imperial League of Australia, serving as federal treasurer of the organisation between 1954 and 1956.

Bridgeford died on 21 September 1971 at Kenmore in Queensland, aged 77. He was survived by his son and stepdaughter, whom he formally adopted as his daughter.

== Notes ==
=== Citations ===
Military offices
| Preceded by Lieutenant General Sir Horace Robertson | C-in-C British Commonwealth Forces Korea; 1951–1953 | Succeeded by Lieutenant General Henry Wells |
| Preceded by Major General Stanley Savige | General Officer Commanding 3rd Division; 1944–1947 | Succeeded by Major General George Wootten |
