= Wyrallah, New South Wales =

Historical Australian village

Coordinates: 28°54′S 153°18′E

Wyrallah, New South Wales is a historical village in the Northern Rivers region of New South Wales, Australia. It is located within the City of Lismore local government area.

The village is located on the east bank of the Wilsons River and a nearby hill. It is also situated on Wyrallah Road generally midway between Lismore and Woodburn. This route is often used as a shortcut for people travelling on the Pacific Highway between Woodburn and Bangalow.

Wyrallah in 1865 was the first location in the Richmond River valley to have a significant permanent sawmill. A large proportion of the timber for which was sourced from the nearby Big Scrub rainforest. It was also an important stopping off point for river transport along the Wilsons River which was then known as the North Arm of the Richmond River.
