= John Raymond Broadbent (quartermaster-general) =

Australian Army officer

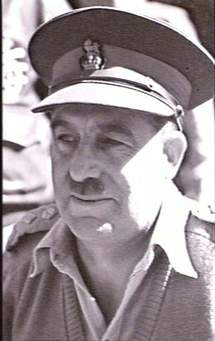
- Brigadier John Broadbent in June 1943
- Born: 18 February 1893; Ballarat, Victoria
- Died: 28 February 1972 (aged 79)
- Military career
- Allegiance: Australia
- Branch: Australian Army
- Service years: 1911–1950
- Rank: Brigadier
- Service number: NX34728 (N8)
- Commands: 7th Light Horse Regiment (1940)
- Conflicts: First World War; Gallipoli Campaign; Second World War; New Guinea campaign
- Awards: Commander of the Order of the British Empire; Mentioned in Despatches

Brigadier John Raymond Broadbent, CBE (18 February 1893 – 28 February 1972) was a senior Australian Army officer in the Second World War.

== Early life ==
Broadbent was born in Ballarat, Victoria and enlisted in Sydney on 14 June 1940.

== Service history ==
Broadbent held numerous posts during the Second World War, while acting as a temporary brigadier, and was Mentioned in Despatches in 1945. He held the following posts:

- 1940 – Commanding Officer 7th Light Horse
- 1940 – General Staff Officer 1 1st Australian Cavalry Division
- 1940–1941 – Assistant Adjutant & Quartermaster-General 8th Australian Infantry Division [Malaya]
- 1942 – Deputy Adjutant & Quartermaster-General New Guinea Force
- 1942–1943 – Deputy Adjutant & Quartermaster-General I Australian Corps [New Guinea]
- 1943–1944 – Deputy Adjutant & Quartermaster-General II Australian Corps
- 1944–1945 – Deputy Adjutant & Quartermaster-General I Australian Corps

== Honours and awards ==
- Commander of the Order of the British Empire
- Mention in Despatches

== See also ==
- List of Australian generals and brigadiers
