= British Commonwealth Forces Korea =

1950–1956 units in the Korean War

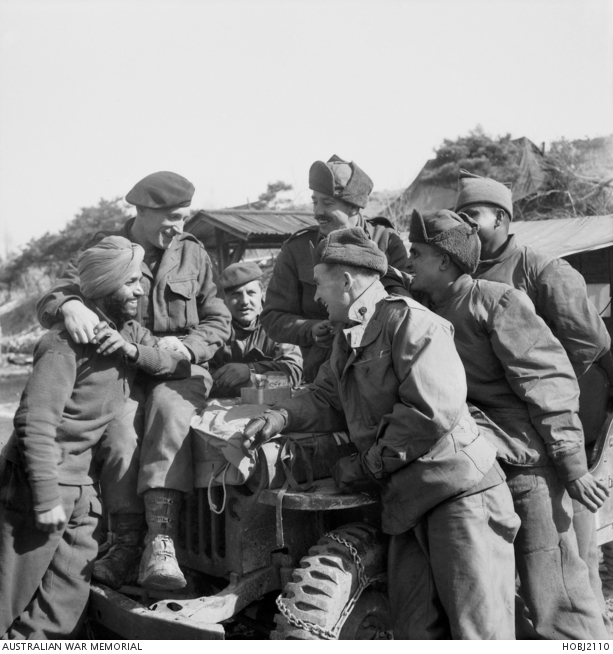
- Indian, British, New Zealander and Australian soldiers in Korea, c. March 1951.
- Active: 1950–1956
- Country: United Kingdom; Australia; New Zealand; Canada; India
- Allegiance: United Nations
- Type: Rapid reaction force
- Garrison/HQ: 1st Commonwealth Division
- Engagements: Korean War

British Commonwealth Forces Korea (BCFK) was the formal name of the British Commonwealth army, naval and air units serving with the United Nations (UN) in the Korean War. BCFK included Australian, British, Canadian, Indian, and New Zealand units. Some Commonwealth units and personnel served with United States and/or other UN formations, which were not part of BCFK.

== History ==
In 1950, Australian units based with the British Commonwealth Occupation Force (BCOF) in Japan were among the first UN personnel to be deployed in South Korea. After the administrative support role of BCOF in Japan to the fighting forces in Korea had been decided in November 1950, the title BCFK appeared. The position of BCFK Commander-in-Chief was always held by Australian Army officers, the first being Lieutenant General Sir Horace Robertson. Liaison between the Commonwealth C-in-C and the UN high command was provided by a subordinate headquarters in Tokyo.

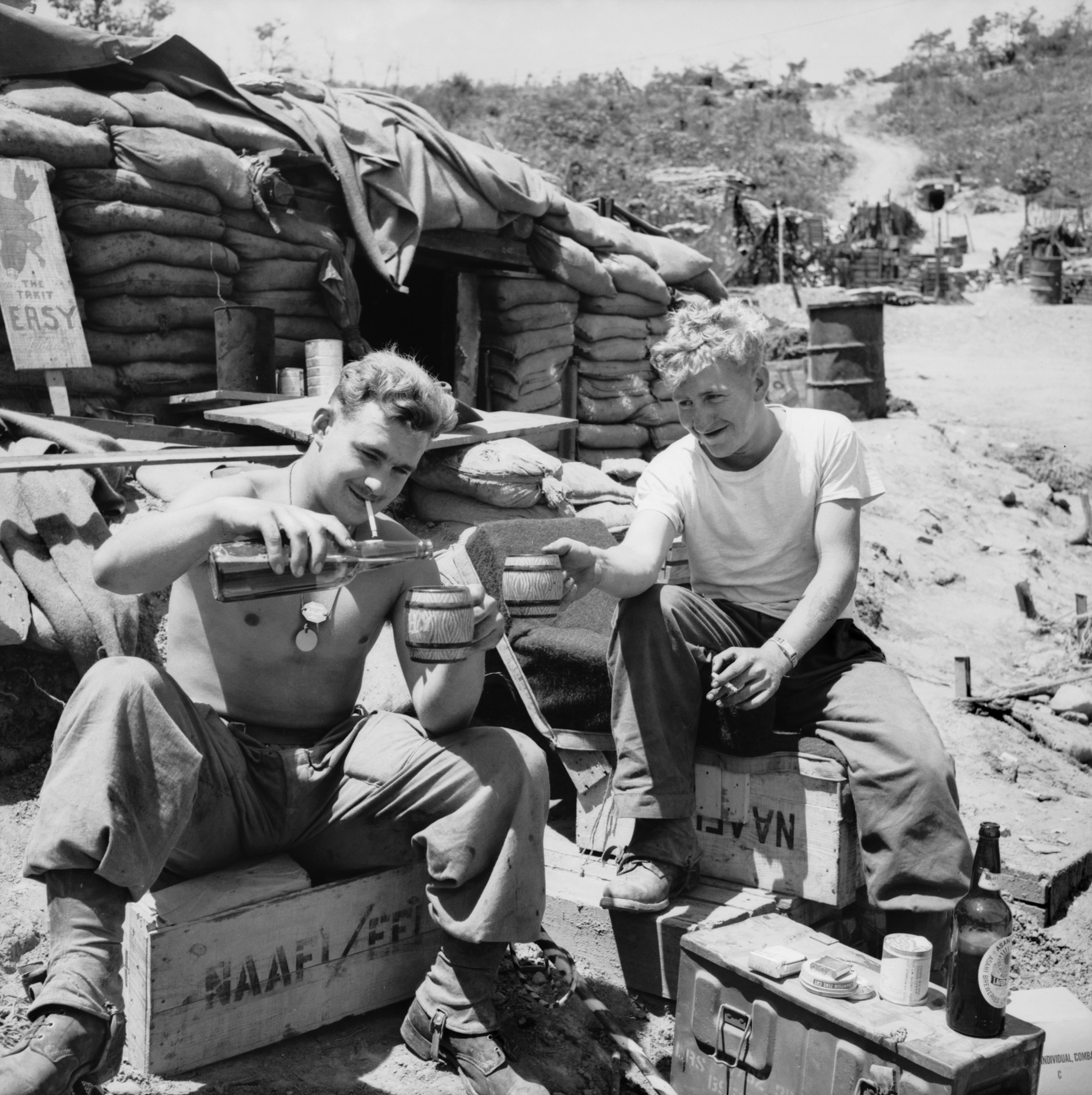
Two Australian Army soldiers enjoy some recreation time at a sandbagged Navy, Army and Air Force Institutes (NAAFI), Korea, 1952

Seven months after BCFK came into being, the Commonwealth armies formed the 1st Commonwealth Division (in July 1951) and British and Canadian Army personnel predominated at the operational level in the Commonwealth land forces. Lieutenant General William Bridgeford took over from Robertson in October 1951, and he was later succeeded by Lieutenant General Henry Wells. Wells was succeeded by Lieutenant General Rudolph Bierwirth in 1954 and Brigadier Leonard Bruton in 1956.

The Royal Navy usually had at least one aircraft carrier on station during the war. Five British carriers: Glory, Ocean, Theseus, Triumph, and Unicorn (a maintenance and aircraft transport carrier) served in the conflict. The Royal Australian Navy provided the carrier HMAS Sydney. The RN, RAN and Royal Canadian Navy also provided many other warships. The Royal New Zealand Navy deployed a number of Loch class frigates throughout the war.

The RN carriers provided the only British fighter planes to take part in the war. On 9 August 1952 a propeller-driven Sea Fury, of No. 802 Squadron, based on HMS Ocean, shot down a MiG-15 jet fighter. Credit was originally assigned to senior officer, Lieutenant Peter Carmichael. However, it was later confirmed by squadron testimony and comparison against squadron diary records that the kill was achieved by Sub Lieutenant Brian 'Shmoo' Ellis, making him one of only a handful of pilots of propeller planes to have shot down a jet.

The only front-line unit from a Commonwealth air force to serve under BCFK was Royal Australian Air Force (RAAF) No. 77 Squadron, which initially flew P-51 Mustang fighters and later converted to Gloster Meteor jets. British and Canadian aircrews also served with the RAAF. The only Royal Air Force contribution was a wing of Short Sunderland flying boats based at Iwakuni in Japan.

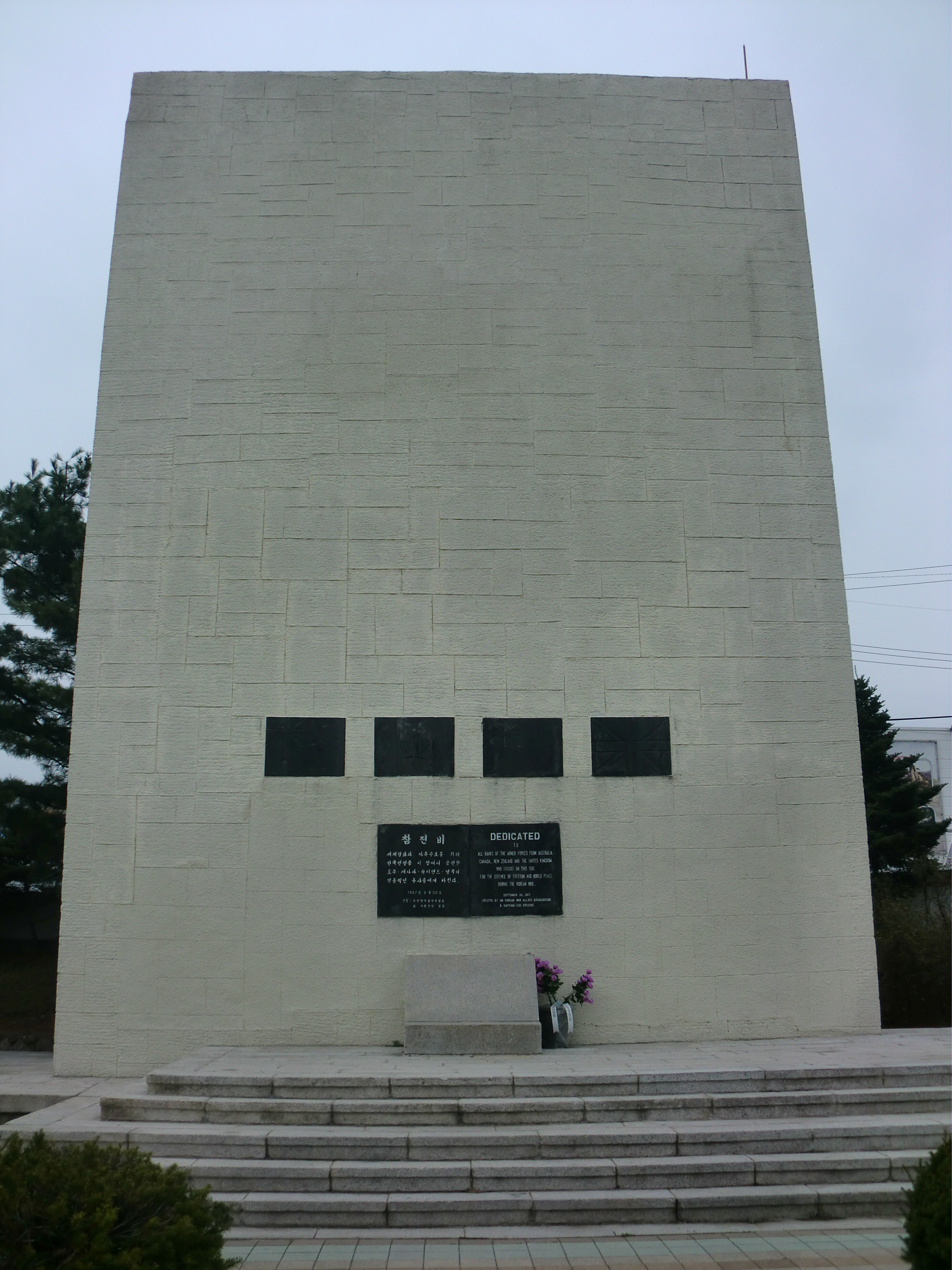
Monument for the Participation of the British Commonwealth in the Korean War

== See also ==
- 1st Commonwealth Division
- KATCOM
- United Nations Memorial Cemetery in Busan, Korea, where a total of 1589 Commonwealth casualties are buried.
- Korean War Memorial in London
