= Department of the Army (Australia) =

Australian federal government department

Department overview
- Formed: 13 November 1939
- Dissolved: 30 November 1973
- Jurisdiction: Commonwealth of Australia
- Minister responsible: Minister for the Army

The Department of the Army was an Australian federal government department. Created on 13 November 1939 following the outbreak of the Second World War, it assumed control of the administration and finance of the Australian Army from the Department of Defence. The department was abolished by the Whitlam government on 30 November 1973 when the single service departments were once again amalgamated, with its role assumed by the Army Office within the Department of Defence.
