= Michael van Balen =

Senior officer in the Royal Australian Navy

Michael Julian van Balen
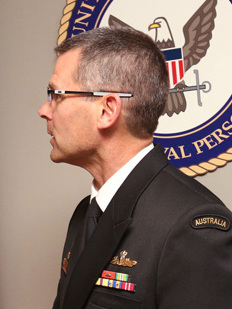
- van Balen with Vice Admiral William Moran of the United States Navy, November 2013
- Born: 16 February 1961 (age 65); Brisbane, Queensland, Australia
- Military career
- Allegiance: Australia
- Branch: Royal Australian Navy
- Service years: 1978–2016
- Rank: Rear Admiral
- Commands: Deputy Chief of Navy (2013–16); HMAS Watson (2005); HMAS Sydney (2002–03)
- Conflicts: Iraq War
- Awards: Officer of the Order of Australia; Commendation for Distinguished Service; Officer of the Legion of Merit (United States)

Rear Admiral Michael Julian van Balen AO (born 16 February 1961) is a retired senior officer of the Royal Australian Navy (RAN), who served as the Deputy Chief of Navy from 2013 to January 2016.

== Early life ==
van Balen was born in Brisbane, Queensland, on 16 February 1961 to Adrian and Cath van Balen.

== Naval career ==
van Balen joined the Royal Australian Navy in 1978 and graduated from the Royal Australian Naval College in 1982.

van Balen has served in a various billets within the Australian naval high command and United States Navy commands.

He has served on board a variety of Royal Australian Navy ships including HMA ships Barbette, Brisbane, Stalwart, Stuart, Yarra, Bunbury, Derwent, Swan and the United States Navy ship USS Ranger, a Forrestal-class aircraft carrier.

van Balen completed a Master of Management degree from the Australian Defence Force Academy in 2001. He attended the US Naval War College in 2005.

== Honours and awards ==

Officer of the Order of Australia	26 January 2015
Commendation for Distinguished Service	26 January 2005
Australian Active Service Medal	
Iraq Medal	
Defence Force Service Medal with 4 clasps	(35–39 Years Service)
Australian Defence Medal	
Officer of the Legion of Merit	(United States)

RADM van Balen has also been awarded the RAN's "Principal Warfare Officer" badge and the RAN's "Sea Readiness Badge".

Military offices
Preceded by Rear Admiral Trevor Jones	Deputy Chief of Navy; 2013–2016	Succeeded by Rear Admiral Michael Noonan
