= David Johnston (admiral) =

Australian naval officer (born 1962)

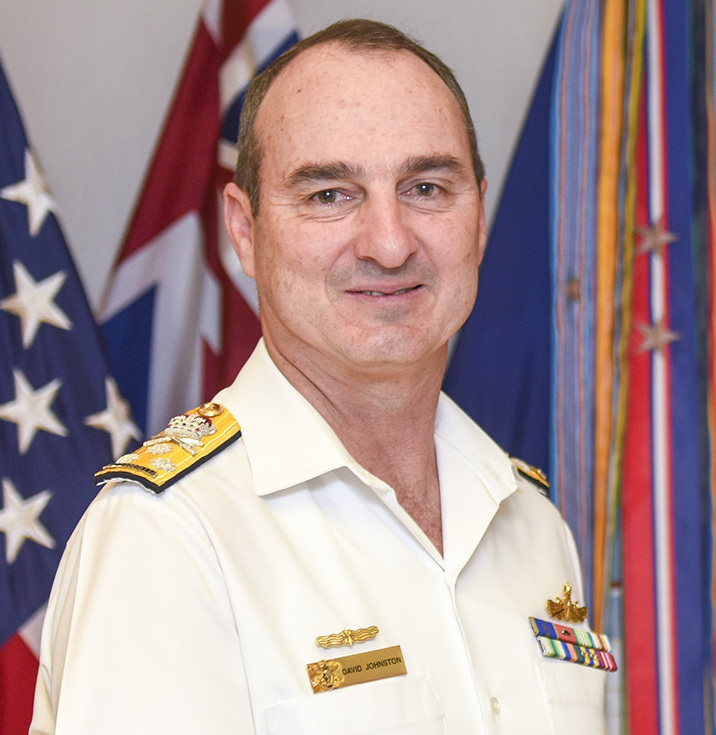
- Johnston in July 2016
- Born: 1962 (age 63–64)
- Military career
- Allegiance: Australia
- Branch: Royal Australian Navy
- Service years: 1978–2026
- Rank: Admiral
- Commands: Chief of the Defence Force; Vice Chief of the Defence Force; Chief of Joint Operations; Border Protection Command; HMAS Newcastle; HMAS Adelaide
- Conflicts: Operation Quickstep; War in Afghanistan; War against the Islamic State
- Awards: Companion of the Order of Australia; Commendation for Distinguished Service; Officer of the Legion of Honour (France); Distinguished Service Order (Singapore)

Admiral David Lance Johnston, AC (born 1962) is a retired senior officer of the Royal Australian Navy. He served as Deputy Commander Joint Task Force 633 on Operation Slipper in 2010, Commander Border Protection Command from 2011 to 2013 and, following promotion to vice admiral, was posted as Chief of Joint Operations from 2014 until 2018. Johnston served as Vice Chief of the Defence Force from July 2018 to July 2024 and was Chief of the Defence Force from July 2024 until his retirement in July 2026.

== Early life and Naval career ==
Born in 1962, Johnston entered the Royal Australian Naval College in 1978 as a junior entry Cadet Midshipman at 16 years old and graduated in 1982 as a Maritime Warfare Officer later specialising as a Principal Warfare Officer after commencing training at HMAS Watson. Throughout the decades he subsequently served as commanding officer of the frigates, HMAS Adelaide and HMAS Newcastle. The latter command included deployment on Operation Quickstep to Fiji in 2006.

Johnston's staff appointments include command and control specialist staff positions in Australian Defence Force Headquarters, Operations Manager at Sailors' Career Management and later as Director Joint Plans in Strategic Operations Division, where he developed the military response options for consideration by the government. In July 2007, on promotion to commodore, he joined Fleet Headquarters as Commodore Flotillas, where he was responsible for planning of maritime operations and the operational training and preparedness of navy's ships, submarines and diving teams. In 2008 he performed the Deputy Coalition Force Maritime Component Commander role and Australian National Commander for Exercise RIMPAC 08. In November 2008 Johnston assumed the role of J3 (Director General Operations) at Headquarters Joint Operations Command. This role encompassed the operational level execution of all Australian Defence Force operations both overseas and within Australia.

In October 2010, Johnston deployed to Operation Slipper in the Middle East Area of Operations as the Deputy Commander Joint Task Force 633. He supported the Commander JTF in providing national command oversight of all Australian Defence Force elements conducting maritime, land and air operations in Iraq and Afghanistan. He was promoted to rear admiral in March 2011 to perform the role of Deputy Commander of the Combined AS/US Task Force for Exercise Talisman Sabre and assumed the role of Deputy Chief of Joint Operations on 6 June 2011. He commanded the operations that supported CHOGM 2011 and the visit to Australia by the President of the United States, also in 2011. Johnston was appointed Commander Border Protection Command in December 2011, and the next month was made a Member of the Order of Australia for "exceptional service" in senior staff appointments and awarded a Commendation for Distinguished Service in recognition of his leadership on Operation Slipper.

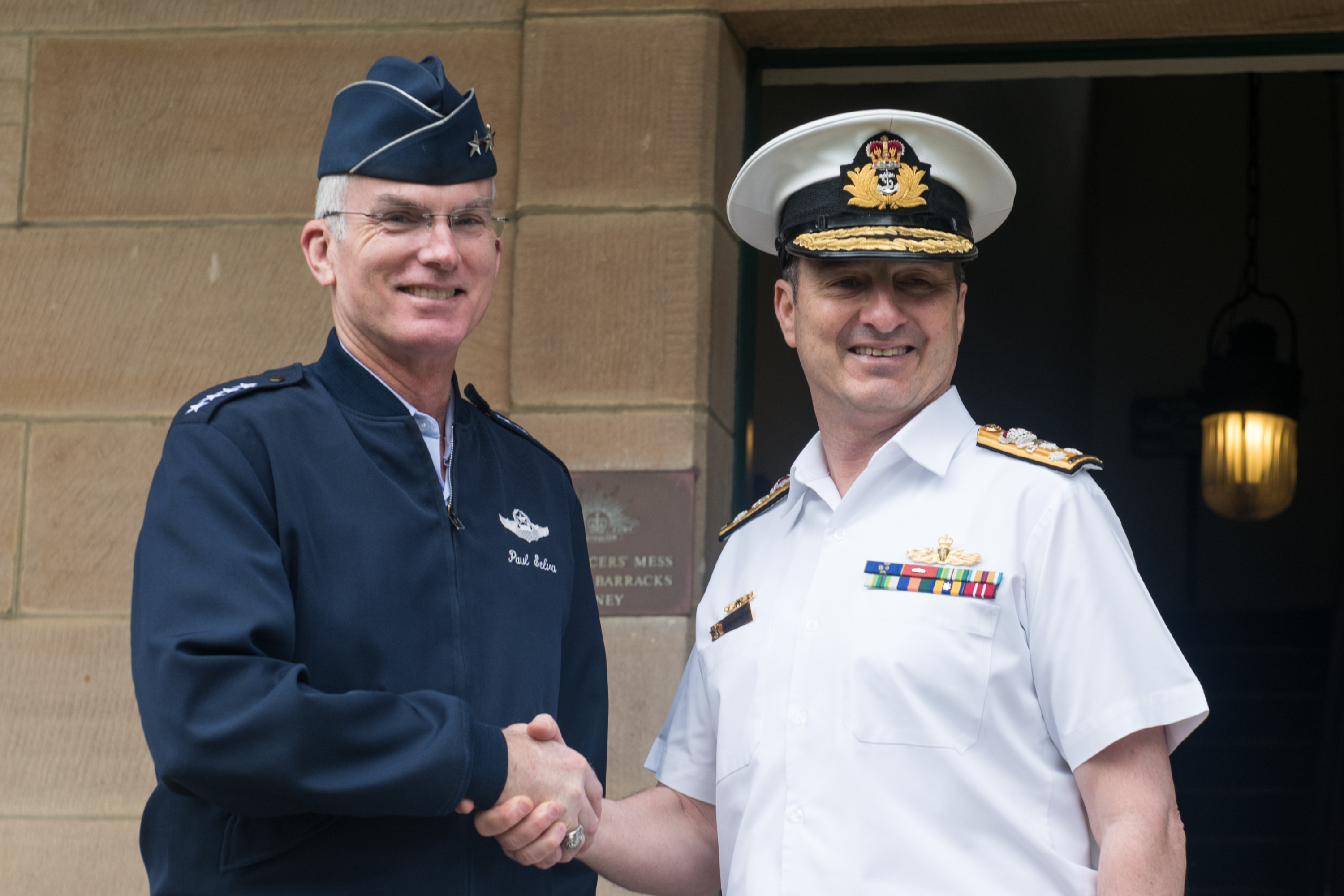
Meeting US Air Force General Paul J. Selva, Sydney, 2018

Johnston was promoted vice admiral and appointed Chief of Joint Operations on 20 May 2014. After four years in the post, Prime Minister Malcolm Turnbull announced on 16 April 2018 that Johnston would succeed Vice Admiral Ray Griggs as Vice Chief of the Defence Force in July. He was replaced as Chief of Joint Operations by Air Marshal Mel Hupfeld on 24 May.

Johnston was advanced to Companion of the Order of Australia in the 2022 Queen's Birthday Honours in recognition of his "eminent service to the Australian Defence Force through strategic stewardship and capability integration." Later that month, Johnston's tenure as Vice Chief of the Defence Force was extended for a further two years.

According to sources he is known to be very humble and considerate. An acquaintance former navy chief Michael Noonan said “He is a bloody hard worker, I’ve never seen him riled up. He is highly respected.”

On 10 July 2024, Johnston was promoted to admiral and appointed the Chief of the Defence Force (CDF), succeeding General Angus Campbell. He is the first naval officer to serve as CDF since Admiral Chris Barrie retired in 2002. He was succeeded as Vice Chief of the Defence Force by Air Marshal Robert Chipman on 9 July 2024.

Johnston was conferred the Distinguished Service Order by the President of Singapore, Tharman Shanmugaratnam, on 7 June 2026 for "his significant contributions in strengthening the close and longstanding defence ties between the Australian Defence Force (ADF) and the Singapore Armed Forces (SAF). His leadership has deepened cooperation for both militaries, strengthened interoperability and fostered closer people-to-people ties through frequent bilateral exercises and professional exchanges." The following month, he relinquished the post of CDF to Admiral Mark Hammond and retired from the ADF.

== Education ==
Johnston holds a Master of Science in Operations Research from the United States Navy Postgraduate School in Monterey, California and a Master of Arts in Strategic Studies from the Australian Defence College.

== Personal life ==
Johnston is married to Belinda and has two children.

Military offices
Preceded by General Angus Campbell	Chief of the Defence Force; 2024–2026	Succeeded by Admiral Mark Hammond
Preceded by Vice Admiral Raymond Griggs	Vice Chief of the Defence Force; 2018–2024	Succeeded by Air Marshal Robert Chipman
Preceded by Lieutenant General Ash Power	Chief of Joint Operations; 2014–2018	Succeeded by Air Marshal Mel Hupfeld
Preceded by Rear Admiral Tim Barrett	Commander Border Protection Command; 2011–2013	Succeeded by Rear Admiral Michael Noonan
