= Allan du Toit =

Senior officer in the Royal Australian Navy (retired)

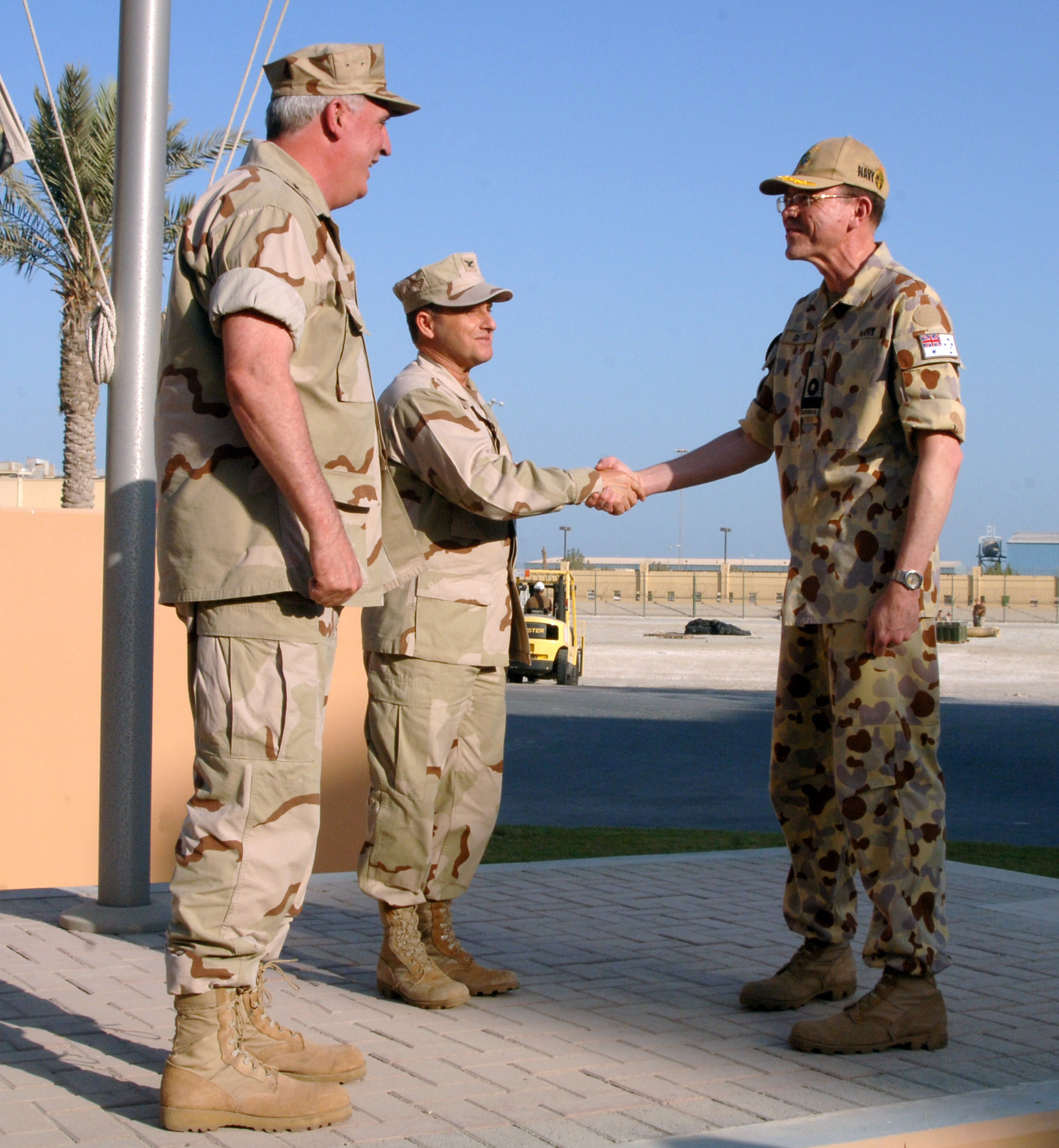
- Allan du Toit (right) with US Navy officers George Cox and Garry Hall
- Born: Durban, South Africa
- Military career
- Allegiance: South Africa (1975–87); Australia (1987–2016)
- Branch: South African Navy (1975–87); Royal Australian Navy (1987–2016)
- Service years: 1975–2016
- Rank: Rear Admiral
- Commands: Head of Navy Capability (2012); Head Navy People and Reputation (2010–12); Border Protection Command (2008–10); Combined Task Force 158 (2007–08); HMAS Tobruk (1997–99)
- Conflicts: Bougainville Civil War; Peace Monitoring Group; War in Afghanistan; Operation Slipper; Iraq War
- Awards: Member of the Order of Australia

Rear Admiral Allan Kendall du Toit, AM is a retired senior officer of the Royal Australian Navy, who served as Australia's Military Representative to NATO and the European Union from 2013 until his retirement in 2016. Du Toit previously served as the Commander Border Protection Command until being succeeded by Rear Admiral Tim Barrett in February 2010.

== Early life ==
Du Toit was born and raised in Durban, South Africa and emigrated to Australia in early 1987.

== Naval career ==
=== South African Navy ===
Du Toit joined the South African Navy as a midshipman in 1975 and graduated from the South African Military Academy in 1979. Du Toit went on to serve aboard frigates, submarines and mine countermeasures vessels as a mine warfare specialist and Principal Warfare Officer and was a junior member of the directing staff at the South African Naval Staff College. In 1986 he received a Chief of the South African Navy's Commendation.

=== Royal Australian Navy ===
Du Toit joined the Royal Australian Navy in February 1987.

Between November 2001 and March 2002 he was the RAN Task Group Commander and became the first non-United States officer to command a multinational naval force enforcing United Nations sanctions against Iraq. He was made a Member of the Order of Australia in the 2004 Australia Day Honours in recognition of this service as Commander of the Multinational Maritime Interception Force.

From September 2007 to March 2008 du Toit was the commander of Coalition Task Force 158 in the Persian Gulf. In this role he commanded forces from the United States, United Kingdom, Singapore, Iraq and Australia.

Du Toit has served in a number of joint and single service command positions, including Director General Military Strategic Commitments in 2006–07, Director General Joint Operations and Plans in 2005–06. du Toit was also the Project Officer for the Mine Hunter Coastal Project from 1993 to 1996.

Du Toit was appointed Commander Border Protection Command on 9 May 2008 and served in that role until replaced by Rear Admiral Tim Barrett on 9 February 2010.

On 1 February 2012, du Toit was appointed Head of Navy Capability and served in that position until the end of 2012. At the beginning of 2013 he was appointed as Australia's Military Representative to NATO and the European Union. He retired from the Royal Australian Navy in early 2016.

== Education ==
During his time as an officer in the South African Navy du Toit graduated from the Naval Staff College and the South African Military Academy where he received a Bachelor degree in Military Science.

Du Toit received a Masters in Defence Studies and a Graduate Diploma in Strategic Studies from the University of New South Wales. He was a founding member of the Naval Studies Group, which is part UNSW's Centre for the Study of Armed Conflict and Society, and As of 4 April 2017 is undertaking part-time doctoral study in naval history at the University College, Australian Defence Force Academy.

== Personal life ==
Du Toit lives in the Huon Valley in Tasmania with his partner Carolyn, a former Australian diplomat, and her young daughter. He has two adult sons and is a keen rugby union and cricket supporter.

== Writings ==
Du Toit wrote his first published book on warships when he was 15 years old; the book was later published while he was serving as a midshipman in the South African Navy. Du Toit has gone on to write two other books, one on warships and the other on South African naval history.

- du Toit, Allan (1976). Ships of the South African Navy. S. A. Boating Publications. ISBN 9780620026994.
- du Toit, Allan (1992). South Africaʼs Fighting Ships: Past and Present. Ashanti Publications. ISBN 1874800502.
- du Toit, Allan (1996). From Cradle to Grave?: The Place of the Aircraft Carrier in Australia's Post-war Defence Force. Australian Defence Force Academy.

Military offices
Preceded by Unknown	Head of Navy Capability; 2012	Succeeded by Rear Admiral Mark Campbell
Preceded by Rear Admiral James Goldrick	Border Protection Command; 2008–2010	Succeeded by Rear Admiral Tim Barrett
