= Davyd Thomas =

Australian Navy officer (born 1956)

Davyd Rhys Thomas
- Born: 2 May 1956 (age 70); Newcastle, New South Wales
- Military career
- Allegiance: Australia
- Branch: Royal Australian Navy (1974–2011)
- Service years: 1974–2011
- Rank: Rear Admiral
- Commands: Deputy Chief of Navy (2008–11); Australian Defence College (2007–08); Commander Australian Fleet (2005–07); Commodore Flotillas (2004–05); HMAS Newcastle (2001–02); HMAS Darwin (1994–96)
- Conflicts: Gulf War; Operation Desert Shield; War in Afghanistan; Operation Slipper
- Awards: Officer of the Order of Australia; Conspicuous Service Cross; Commendation for Distinguished Service
- Other work: President of the Australian Naval Institute (2008–11); Member of the ANZAC Centenary Advisory Board (2011–present); Vice President of Austal (2012–present)

Rear Admiral Davyd Rhys Thomas, AO, CSC (born 2 May 1956) is a retired senior officer in the Royal Australian Navy.

== Naval career ==
Davyd Rhys Thomas was born on 2 May 1956 in Newcastle, New South Wales, and joined the Royal Australian Navy College from that city in 1974. After gaining a Bridge Watchkeeping Certificate in 1978, he served as executive officer of HMAS Aware, a Darwin-based patrol boat.

Thomas was promoted to lieutenant in 1979, during which time he commenced his warfare training, and served on HMAS Brisbane. A short stint on the staff at the RAN Apprentice Training Establishment, prior to professional warfare specialist training in the United Kingdom, followed in 1983.

Upon his return to Australia, Thomas served as the operations officer on HMAS Vampire, and later on HMAS Perth as Gunnery Officer. He then completed the RAN Staff Course in 1987, and was subsequently employed as the surface weapons trials officer at the RAN's Test and Evaluation Centre in Sydney.

Thomas was then posted as executive officer of HMAS Adelaide, and participated in the first RAN contingent to the Persian Gulf in 1990, as part of Operation Desert Shield; he was promoted to commander in December 1990.

He then served in Western Australia as the operations officer at Fleet Base West. In September 1994, Thomas assumed command of HMAS Darwin, based on the West Coast.

In the Australia Day Honour's List of 1997, Thomas was awarded the Conspicuous Service Cross and was promoted to captain in July of the same year. March 1999 saw him posted as Director of Naval Officers' Postings, until assuming command of HMAS Newcastle in March 2001.

As the commanding officer of Newcastle during Operation Slipper in the Persian Gulf, Thomas conducted maritime interdiction in support of coalition forces enforcing United Nations sanctions against Iraq. For this he was awarded a Commendation for Distinguished Service in June 2003.

He was promoted to the rank of commodore and made a Member of the Order of Australia in mid-2002 for "exceptional service to the Royal Australian Navy". He later assumed the position of Commodore Flotillas and Commander Deployable Joint Force Headquarters (Maritime) in February 2004.

Thomas was promoted to rear admiral and appointed to the position of Maritime Commander Australia (MCAUST) in July 2005; in 2007 this position was renamed Commander Australian Fleet (COMAUSFLT).

On 3 August 2007, Thomas assumed command of the Australian Defence College, which on 14 January 2008 became Joint Education, Training and Warfare (JETW) Command (which encompasses the Australian Defence College Headquarters, the Australian Defence Force Academy, the Australian Command and Staff College, the Centre for Defence and Strategic Studies and the ADF Warfare Centre).

Thomas assumed the duties of Deputy Chief of Navy (DCN) on 6 June 2008. In the Australia Day Honours List of 2009, Thomas was appointed an Officer of the Order of Australia for his service as Commodore Flotillas, Maritime Commander Australia, Commander Australian Fleet and Commander, Australian Defence College. He relinquished the post of DCN on 18 February 2011 to Rear Admiral Trevor Jones.

== Honours and awards ==

| Ribbon | Description | Notes |
| | Officer of the Order of Australia (AO) | Australia Day Honours List 2009 |
| | Member of the Order of Australia (AM) | Queen's Birthday Honours List 2002 |
| | Conspicuous Service Cross (CSC) | Australia Day Honours List 1997 |
| | Commendation for Distinguished Service | Queen's Birthday Honours List 2003 |
| | Australian Active Service Medal | with ICAT and IRAQ 2003 clasps |
| | Afghanistan Medal | |
| | Australian Service Medal | with KUWAIT clasp |
| | Defence Force Service Medal with Federation Star | 40 plus years service |
| | Australian Defence Medal | |

Military offices
| Preceded by Rear Admiral Russ Crane | Deputy Chief of Navy; 2008–2011 | Succeeded by Rear Admiral Trevor Jones |
| Preceded by New position Replaces Commander Australian Defence College | Commander Joint Education, Training and Warfare; January – May 2008 | Succeeded by Rear Admiral James Goldrick |
| Preceded by Brigadier Brian Dawson (acting) | Commander Australian Defence College; 2007–2008 | Succeeded by None; Replaced by Commander Joint Education, Training and Warfare |
| Preceded by New position Replaces Maritime Commander Australia | Commander Australian Fleet; 2007 | Succeeded by Rear Admiral Nigel Coates |
| Preceded by Rear Admiral Rowan Moffitt | Maritime Commander Australia; 2005–2007 | Succeeded by None; Replaced by Commander Australian Fleet |
