= Ray Griggs =

Australian naval officer (born 1961)

Ray Griggs AO, CSC
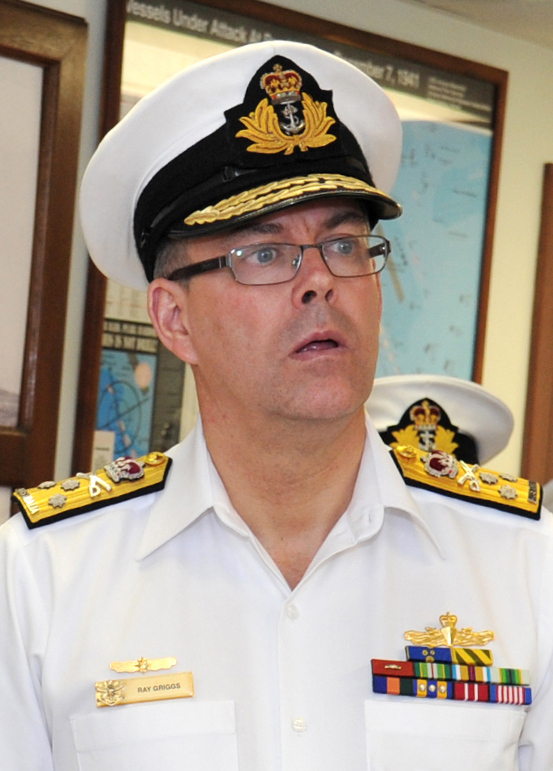
- Vice Admiral Ray Griggs in 2019

Secretary of the Department of Social Services
- In office 22 July 2021 – 10 December 2024
- Preceded by: Kathryn Campbell
- Succeeded by: Michael Lye

Personal details
- Born: July 1961 (age 64) Homebush, New South Wales

Military service
- Allegiance: Australia
- Branch/service: Royal Australian Navy; Royal Australian Navy Reserve
- Years of service: 1978–2018; 2018–present
- Rank: Vice admiral
- Commands: Vice Chief of the Defence Force (2014–18); Chief of Navy (2011–14); Australian Amphibious Task Group (2005–06); HMAS Arunta (2001–03)
- Battles/wars: War in Afghanistan
- Awards: Officer of the Order of Australia; Conspicuous Service Cross; Commendation for Distinguished Service

Vice Admiral Raymond James Griggs, AO, CSC (born July 1961) is an Australian former senior public servant and senior officer in the Royal Australian Navy. He served as Chief of Navy from June 2011 to June 2014, before being appointed Vice Chief of the Defence Force until his transfer to the reserve in July 2018.

Following his transfer to the reserves, Griggs held the appointment of the Associate Secretary of the Indigenous Affairs Group within the Department of Prime Minister and Cabinet, and was the inaugural CEO of the National Indigenous Australians Agency. He was Secretary of the Department of Social Services from 22 July 2021 until 10 December 2024.

== Early years ==
Griggs was born in Homebush, New South Wales, in July 1961 to James and Maureen Griggs.

== Naval career ==
Griggs joined the Adelaide Port Division of the Royal Australian Navy Reserve in 1978 as a radio operator. He entered the Royal Australian Naval College at HMAS Creswell on a "short service commission" in 1979. In his early years, Griggs served on the aircraft carrier HMAS Melbourne and HMA ships Yarra and Advance. He then spent 12 months with the Royal Navy on HMS Jersey, where he gained his Bridge Watchkeeping Certificate. In late 1981 he was posted to HMAS Perth as a bridge watchkeeper and deployed to the North West Indian Ocean.

Promoted to lieutenant, from 1983 to 1994 Griggs completed a series of postings as navigating officer of HMA Ships Cessnock, Torrens, Tobruk, Jervis Bay and Perth. Other roles included: aide-de-camp to the Governor of Tasmania, Sir James Plimsoll; two postings in the navy's officer career management directorate; staff officer (navigation) to the Commander Australian Patrol Boat Forces; and at Australian Defence Headquarters in Canberra, deputy director military strategy as lieutenant commander, and director future warfare as captain.

From 1995 to 1997 Griggs served as commissioning executive officer of HMAS Anzac, helping to bring the Anzac class frigates into service. In October 2001 he assumed command of the ANZAC class frigate HMAS Arunta and was immediately involved in border protection duties as part of Operation RELEX. Arunta then deployed to the Persian Gulf to enforce United Nations sanctions against Iraq and in support of "The War on Terror". The ship was recognized for her efforts by being awarded the Duke of Gloucester Cup for being the most operationally efficient ship in the RAN fleet for 2002. In 2003 Griggs was posted as the ANZAC class capability element manager in Rockingham, Western Australia. In 2004 he studied at the National War College in Washington, D.C., prior to assuming command of the Australian Amphibious Task Group in mid-2005.

Griggs was promoted to commodore in February 2006 and appointed as the deputy maritime (fleet) commander, until assuming the position of director general navy strategic policy and futures in Navy Headquarters in September 2007. In February 2008 he was seconded to the Defence White Paper team, where he led the development of the force structure review that provided the force structure underpinning the 2009 White Paper. In early 2009 he attended the UK Higher Command and Staff Course and was subsequently promoted to rear admiral and appointed as deputy head strategic reform and governance. In May 2010 he was posted as Deputy Chief of Joint Operations.

Griggs handed over command of the Navy to Vice Admiral Tim Barrett during a ceremony on 30 June 2014, and succeeded Air Marshal Mark Binskin as VCDF that day. After four years in the post and 40 years of service, Griggs transferred to the reserve on 6 July 2018 and was replaced as VCDF by Vice Admiral David Johnston.

== Post military career ==
Following his transfer to the reserves, Griggs held the appointment of the Associate Secretary of the Indigenous Affairs Group within the Department of Prime Minister and Cabinet, and was the inaugural CEO of the National Indigenous Australians Agency.

On 9 July 2021, Prime Minister Scott Morrison announced Griggs' appointment as Secretary of the Department of Social Services, with effect from 22 July 2021. Where he implemented reforms and introduced mantra of 4 Cs Curiosity, Collaboration, Contestability and Courage.

== Other activities ==
Griggs is an honorary patron of the ACT Veterans Rugby Club.

On 15 January 2020, it was announced that Griggs would be one of the members of the National Co-design Group of the Indigenous voice to government.

== Education ==
- Bachelor of Arts, University of Queensland
- Master of Business Administration, National Graduate School of Management, Australian National University
- Master of Science (National Security Strategy), National Defense University, Washington D.C.

== Personal life ==
Griggs is married to Chloe and has a son and a daughter.

== Honours and awards ==
The breast star insignia of the Grand Cross with White Decoration of the Order of Naval Merit awarded by Spain

Griggs was awarded the Conspicuous Service Cross in 1997, a Commendation for Distinguished Service in 2003 for his work in the Persian Gulf, and was appointed a Member of the Order of Australia in 2009.

Griggs was elevated to an Officer of the Order of Australia in the 2012 Queen's Birthday Honours list, "For distinguished service to the Australian Defence Force as Deputy Head Strategic Reform and Governance, Deputy Chief of Joint Operations, and Chief of the Royal Australian Navy."

Ribbon	Description	Notes
	Officer of the Order of Australia (AO)	June 2012
	Member of the Order of Australia (AM)	2009
	Conspicuous Service Cross (CSC)	1997
	Commendation for Distinguished Service	2003
	Australian Active Service Medal	
	Afghanistan Medal	
	Australian Service Medal	
	Operational Service Medal for Border Protection	
	Defence Force Service Medal with federation star	(40+ Years Service)
	Australian Defence Medal	
	Navy Meritorious Service Star (Indonesia)	19 November 2012
	Commander of the Legion of Merit (United States)	May 2013
	Officer of the Legion of Honour (France)	25 March 2014
	Meritorious Service Medal (Singapore)	15 May 2014
	Military Civic Action Medal (Philippines)	
	Grand Cross with White Decoration of the Order of Naval Merit (Spain)	October 2014

Griggs has also been awarded the RAN's "Principal Warfare Officer" badge and the RAN's "Sea Readiness Badge" with Gold Star.

Government offices
Preceded by Kathryn Campbell	Secretary of the Department of Social Services; 2021–2024	Succeeded by Michael Lye
Military offices
Preceded by Air Marshal Mark Binskin	Vice Chief of the Defence Force; 2014–2018	Succeeded by Vice Admiral David Johnston
Preceded by Vice Admiral Russ Crane	Chief of Navy; 2011–2014	Succeeded by Vice Admiral Tim Barrett
Preceded by Major General Ash Power	Deputy Chief of Joint Operations; 2010–2011	Succeeded by Rear Admiral Steve Gilmore
