= Trevor Jones (admiral) =

Australian Royal Navy admiral

Trevor Norman Jones
- Military career
- Allegiance: Australia
- Branch: Royal Australian Navy
- Service years: 1978–2016
- Rank: Rear Admiral
- Commands: Joint Task Force 633 (2014–16); Military Strategic Commitments (2013–14); Deputy Chief of Navy (2011–13); HMAS Newcastle (2004–05); HMAS Darwin (2001–02)
- Conflicts: Iraq War; War in Afghanistan; War against the Islamic State
- Awards: Officer of the Order of Australia; Distinguished Service Cross; Conspicuous Service Cross

Rear Admiral Trevor Norman Jones, AO, DSC, CSC is a retired senior officer in the Royal Australian Navy (RAN). He served as Deputy Chief of Navy from 2011 to 2013, Head Military Strategic Commitments from April 2013 to December 2014, and the Commander Joint Task Force 633 from December 2014 to January 2016.

== Naval career ==
Jones joined the RAN in January 1978 under the Navy scholarship scheme to pursue a Seaman Officer Career. After graduating in 1980 from the University of New South Wales with a Bachelor of Science, he undertook professional seaman officer training in HMA Ships Melbourne (II), Supply and Derwent and HMAS establishments Watson and Cerberus.

In 1986 Lieutenant Jones undertook his Principal Warfare Officer's Course (PWO) and, following graduation, joined HMAS Swan (III) as the PWO Anti-Submarine Warfare (ASW) Officer. In 1989 he was selected to study for a master's degree in Acoustic Engineering at the United States Post Graduate School and graduated in 1991. Promoted to lieutenant commander in 1990 whilst studying, he joined HMAS Brisbane (II) in 1992 as the PWO ASW Officer and Operations Officer.

Promoted to commander in 1996, he returned to Sea Training Group, this time as the Fleet Executive and Damage Control Officer until 1998. He was appointed assistant director, Naval Officers' Postings in 1999, responsible for the management and leadership of all officer career managers for officers up to the rank of lieutenant commander.

Jones assumed command of HMAS Darwin (FFG 04) in 2001 and was involved in Operation Trek (Australian assistance to the Solomon Islands). He was awarded the Conspicuous Service Cross in the 2001 Queens Birthday Honours list for his service as the assistant director, Naval Officer's Postings.

Promoted to captain in 2002, he was appointed Director Navy Force Structure and Warfare in the Navy Capability Preparedness and Plans Branch of Navy Headquarters. He assumed command of HMAS Newcastle (FFG 06) from 2004 to 2005, and in 2005 he deployed in HMAS Newcastle on Operation Catalyst (Australian assistance to the reconstruction and rehabilitation of Iraq).

Jones was promoted to commodore in February 2005 and was appointed Director General Naval Capability, Performance and Plans in Navy Headquarters. In 2006 he attended the six-week Harvard Business School Advanced Management Program in Boston, US, and in mid-2007 he was appointed Director General Military Strategic Commitments. In 2008 he attended the Coalition Forces Maritime Component Command Course in Hawaii, sponsored by the Commander US Pacific Fleet.

In April 2009, Jones was appointed Chief of Staff and Deputy Commander Joint Task Force 633, the combined Task Force providing national command over Australian Defence Force elements assigned to Operations Catalyst, Kruger and Slipper supporting whole of government efforts in Iraq, the Middle East Area of Operations and maritime approaches, and Afghanistan.

On return to Australia in November 2009, Jones was promoted to rear admiral and appointed as the Head Navy People and Reputation.

In January 2010 Jones was appointed a Member of the Order of Australia for his combined efforts as the Director General Naval Capability, Performance and Plans and Director General Military Strategic Commitments.

Jones assumed the role of Deputy Chief of Navy on 18 February 2011. On 26 January 2014, Jones was advanced to Officer of the Order of Australia as part of the Australia Day Honours.

Jones took over as Commander Joint Task Force 633 in December 2014. In this post he was responsible for Australian operations in the Middle East, namely those against ISIL in Iraq. After 14 months in command, he was succeeded by Air Vice Marshal Tim Innes in January 2016 and retired from the navy later that year. In 2017 Jones was awarded the Distinguished Service Cross in recognition of his leadership in the Middle East.

Military offices
Preceded by Major General Craig Orme	Commander Joint Task Force 633; 2014–2016	Succeeded by Air Vice Marshal Tim Innes
Preceded by Rear Admiral Davyd Thomas	Deputy Chief of Navy; 2011–2013	Succeeded by Rear Admiral Michael van Balen
