= Stuart Mayer =

Senior Royal Australian Navy officer

Stuart Campbell Mayer
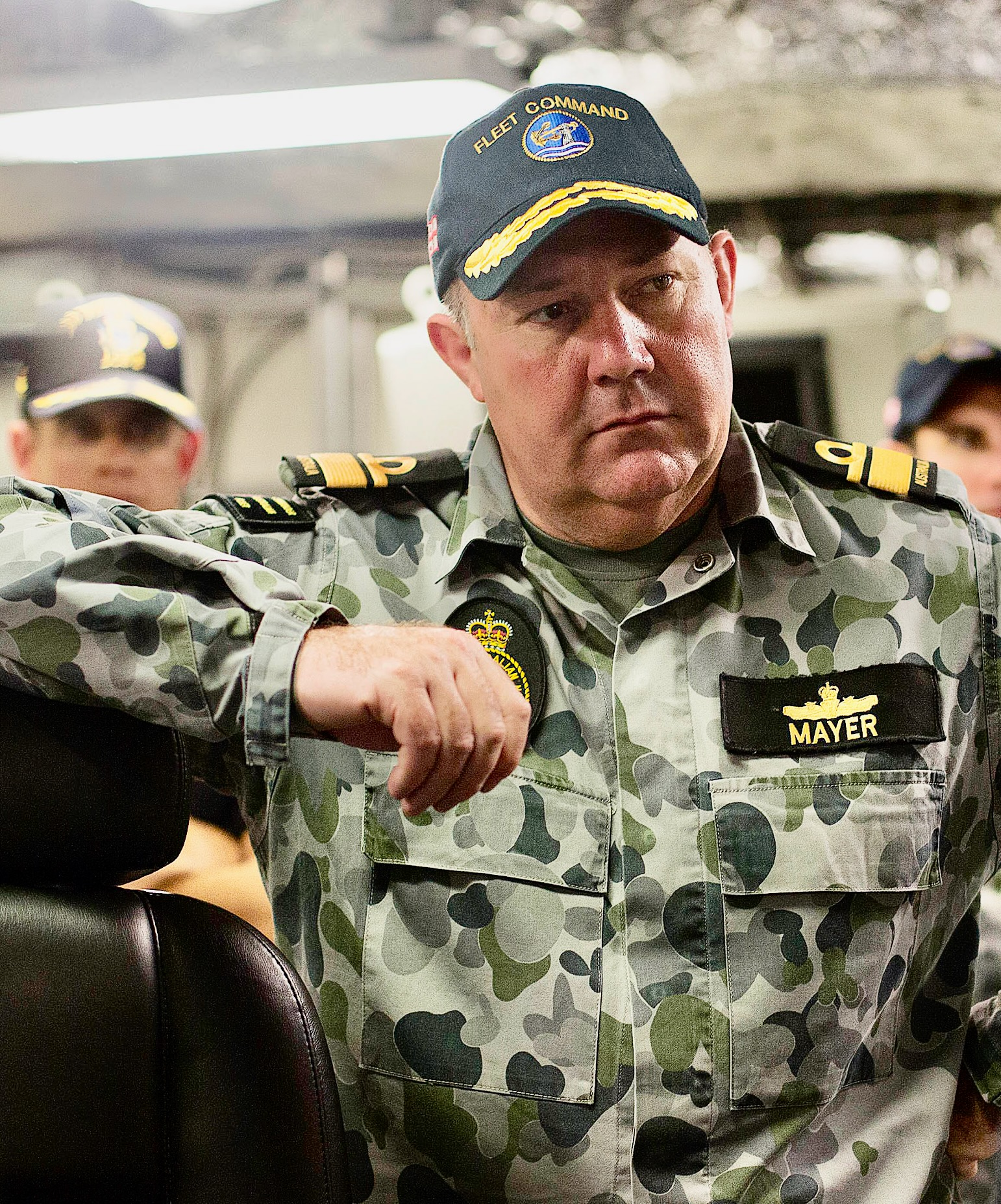
- Vice Admiral Stuart Mayer in December 2021
- Born: 1965 or 1966 (age 60–61)
- Military career
- Allegiance: Australia
- Branch: Royal Australian Navy
- Service years: 1984–2022
- Rank: Vice Admiral
- Commands: Deputy Commander United Nations Command (2019–21); Head Force Design (2018–19); Fleet Command (2014–18); International Stabilisation Force (2009–10); HMAS Anzac (2007–09); HMAS Canberra (2002–04)
- Conflicts: Gulf War; International Force East Timor; Iraq War; Operation Astute
- Awards: Officer of the Order of Australia; Conspicuous Service Cross & Bar; Commendation for Distinguished Service; Medal of Merit (Timor-Leste); Officer of the Legion of Merit (United States); Meritorious Service Medal (United States)

Vice Admiral Stuart Campbell Mayer, AO, CSC & Bar (born c. 1965) is a retired senior officer of the Royal Australian Navy. He joined the navy via the Royal Australian Naval College at HMAS Creswell in 1984 and qualified as a Principal Warfare Officer in 1994. He commanded HMAS Canberra (2002–04), HMAS Anzac (2007–09) and the International Stabilisation Force (2009–10), and deployed on operations to the Persian Gulf, East Timor, and the Arabian Sea during the Iraq War. He served as Commander Australian Fleet from 2014 to 2018, Head Force Design within the Vice Chief of Defence Force Group from 2018 to 2019, and Deputy Commander United Nations Command, based in South Korea, from 2019 to 2021. He retired from the navy in 2022 and was appointed a partner in Ernst & Young's consulting division.

== Naval career ==
=== Early career ===
Mayer completed the Higher School Certificate in 1983 at North Sydney Boys High School. He joined the Royal Australian Naval College in 1984 as a seaman specialist, and on completion of initial training Mayer gained Bridge Watch-keeping Certificates on board HMAS Gladstone and HMAS Darwin. Mayer completed training as an air intercept controller and returned to sea in HMA ships Canberra and HMAS Sydney, including service aboard Sydney "as Air Intercept Control Officer and Boarding Officer during that ship's operational deployment to the Persian Gulf during the 1990–91 Gulf war."

In 1993 Mayer commenced training as a principal warfare officer (direction) and graduated with distinction in 1994. As direction officer, Mayer served aboard both HMAS Canberra and HMAS Adelaide, undertaking a wide range of regional deployments and operations, including service as the task unit operations officer during Operation Stabilise – ADF operations in support of East Timorese independence.

In January 2000 Mayer was promoted to commander and posted to the United States as the first ADF liaison officer to US Joint Forces Command based in Norfolk, Virginia. Mayer returned from the United States in mid-2002 and assumed command of HMAS Canberra, continuing an association with that ship that included service in every rank from trainee to commanding officer.

Mayer left HMAS Canberra in July 2004 and was promoted to the rank of captain and assumed the position of chief staff officer (operations) at Maritime Headquarters (MHQ) Australia in January 2005. While posted to MHQ, Mayer was seconded to the Australian Maritime Deployable HQ staff for duties as commander, Task Group 58.1 – Northern Arabian Gulf Maritime Security Operations commander. Mayer was awarded a Commendation for Distinguished Service for his "distinguished performance" in this role. Mayer returned to MHQ in October 2005, resuming duties as chief staff officer (operations). His "outstanding achievement" while with MHQ led to the award of a Conspicuous Service Cross (CSC) in 2008.

=== Senior commands ===
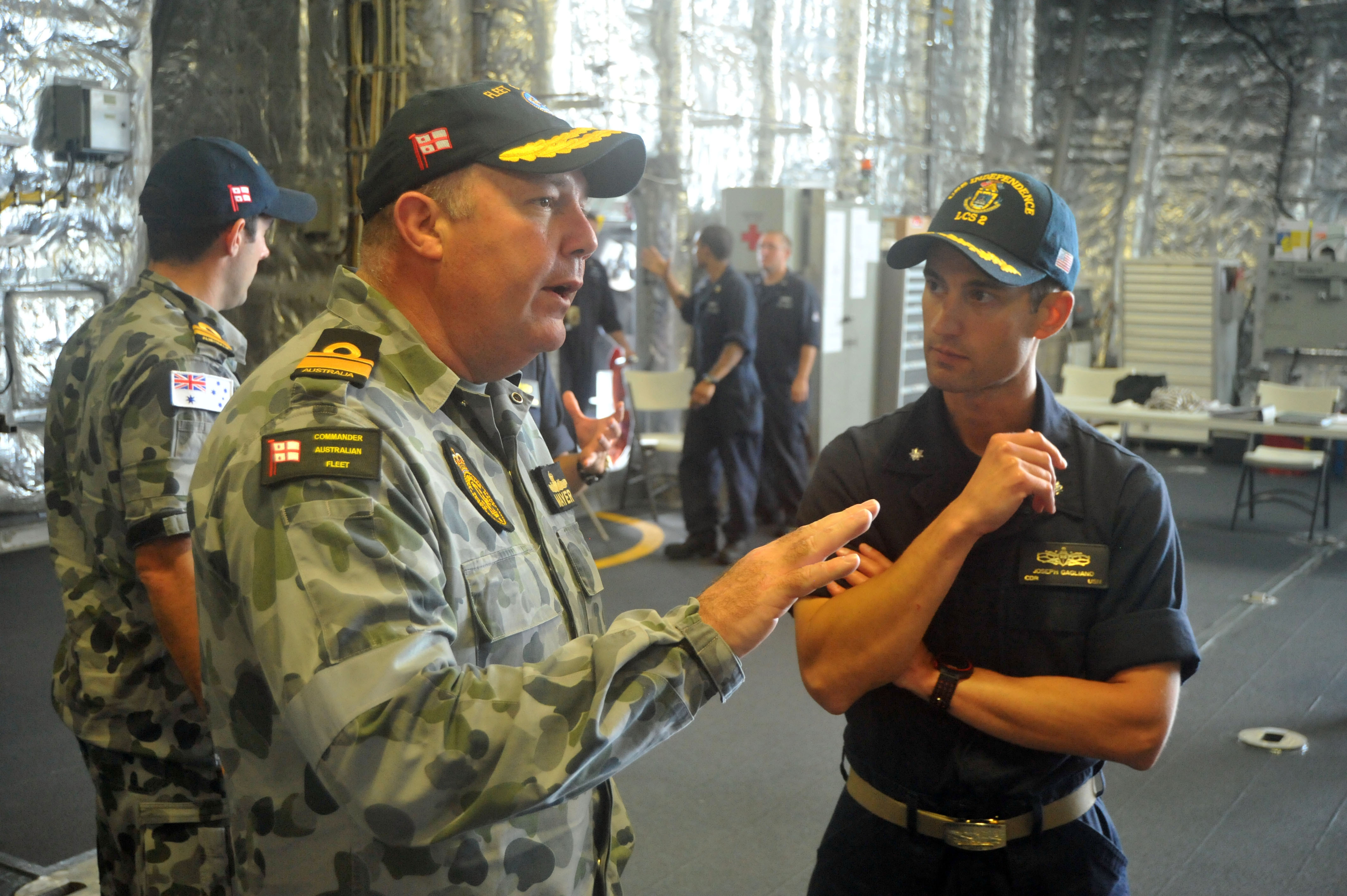
Rear Admiral Mayer, as commander of the Australian Fleet, aboard USS Independence, 2014

In January 2007 Mayer attended the Australian Defence College and read for a Master of Arts in strategic studies. He assumed command of the frigate HMAS Anzac in December 2007 and completed deployments to exercise RIMPAC and to Southeast Asia as the commander of the RAN Task Group. Mayer left Anzac in mid-2009, was promoted to commodore and appointed commander of the multi-national International Stabilisation Force (ISF) in East Timor on 24 October 2009. The first non-army officer to hold this command, Mayer demonstrated "inspirational leadership and initiative, and outstanding dedication to duty in [a] stable but fragile security environment" during his six-month deployment, for which he was awarded a Bar to his CSC and the East Timorese Medal of Merit.

On Mayer's return to Australia in April 2010, he assumed duties as commodore flotillas at Fleet Headquarters. Promoted to rear admiral, he was appointed commander Australian Fleet on 12 June 2014. In recognition of his "selfless devotion to duty and outstanding achievement" in these senior roles, Mayer was made an Officer of the Order of Australia in the 2017 Australia Day Honours. He relinquished command of the Australian Fleet to Rear Admiral Jonathan Mead in January 2018 and was appointed as head force design within the Vice Chief of Defence Force Group from March.

In April 2019 it was announced that Mayer would be appointed deputy commander United Nations Command in South Korea later in the year. He relinquished head force design in June and, promoted vice admiral on 18 July, succeeded Lieutenant General Wayne Eyre of the Canadian Army as deputy commander on 28 July. He was the second non-American (after Eyre) and first Australian to hold the post in the 69-year history of United Nations Command. Mayer relinquished the post on 15 December 2021. For his work with United Nations Command, Mayer was awarded an Officer of the United States Legion of Merit.

Mayer is a graduate of the Australian Institute of Company Directors, holds a Bachelor of Arts from the University of New South Wales, a Master of Arts from Deakin University, and a Master of Business Administration from the University of Southern Queensland.

== Post-military career ==
Following his retirement from the RAN in 2022, Mayer was appointed a partner in the consulting division at Ernst & Young Australia.

== Personal life ==
Mayer is married to Susanne, with whom he has four children. Mayer's interests include rugby, sailing, bushwalking and kayaking.

Military offices
Preceded by Rear Admiral Tim Barrett	Commander Australian Fleet; 2014–2018	Succeeded by Rear Admiral Jonathan Mead
Preceded by Air Vice Marshal Mel Hupfeld	Head Force Design; 2018–2019	Succeeded by Air Vice Marshal Steve Roberton
Preceded by Lieutenant General Wayne Eyre	Deputy Commander United Nations Command; 2019–2021	Succeeded by Lieutenant General Andrew Harrison
