= James Goldrick =

Australian naval historian (1958–2023)

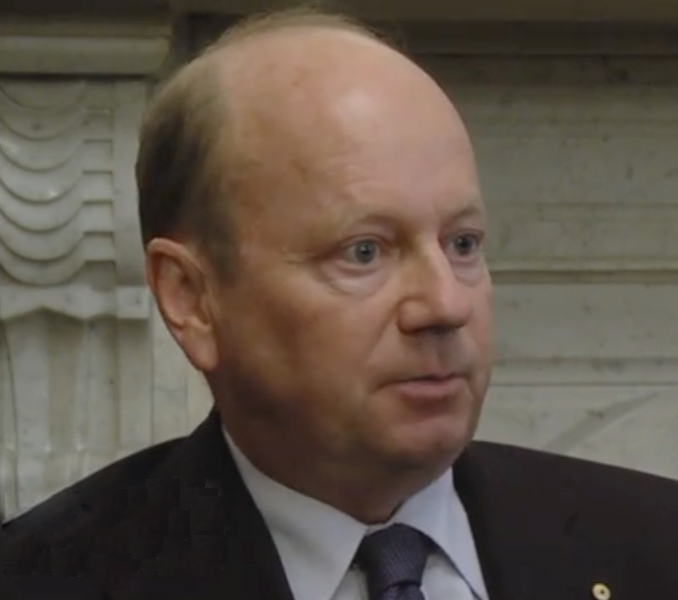
- In a Lowy Institute video in 2013
- Born: 8 August 1958; Sydney, New South Wales
- Died: 17 March 2023 (aged 64); Canberra, Australian Capital Territory
- Military career
- Allegiance: Australia
- Branch: Royal Australian Navy
- Service years: 1974–2012
- Rank: Rear Admiral
- Commands: Australian Defence College (2008–11); Border Protection Command (2006–08); Australian Defence Force Academy (2003–06, 2011–12); RAN Sea Power Centre (1999–00); HMAS Sydney (1996–99); HMAS Cessnock (1990–91)
- Conflicts: War in Afghanistan
- Awards: Officer of the Order of Australia; Conspicuous Service Cross

Rear Admiral James Vincent Purcell Goldrick, AO, CSC (8 August 1958 – 17 March 2023) was an Australian naval historian, analyst of contemporary naval and maritime affairs, and a senior officer of the Royal Australian Navy (RAN). Following his retirement from the RAN, Goldrick was a fellow at the Sea Power Centre – Australia and an adjunct professor in the School of Humanities and Social Sciences in the University of New South Wales at the Australian Defence Force Academy. He was also a member of the Naval Studies Group at the Australian Centre for the Study of Armed Conflict and Society, an adjunct professor in the Strategic and Defence Studies Centre of the Australian National University and a professorial fellow of the Australian National Centre for Ocean Resources and Security at the University of Wollongong. He was a visiting fellow at All Souls College, University of Oxford in the first half of 2015, and a non-resident Fellow of the Lowy Institute from 2013 to 2018.

== Early life and education ==
James Goldrick was born in Sydney, New South Wales on 8 August 1958. He joined the Royal Australian Navy in 1974 as a fifteen-year-old Cadet midshipman. A graduate of the Royal Australian Naval College, he held a Bachelor of Arts degree from the University of New South Wales and a Master of Letters from the University of New England. He attended the six-week Advanced Management Program of Harvard Business School (AMP 168), and was honoured with the degree of Doctor of Letters honoris causa by the University of New South Wales.

== Naval career ==
A principal warfare officer and anti-submarine warfare specialist, Goldrick saw sea service around the world with the RAN and on exchange with the British Royal Navy, including the patrol vessel HMS Alderney, the frigates HMS Sirius, HMAS Swan and HMAS Darwin, and the destroyer HMS Liverpool. He served as executive officer of HMAS Tarakan and HMAS Perth. He was commanding officer of HMAS Cessnock and twice commanded the frigate HMAS Sydney before serving as the inaugural commander of Australian Surface Task Group. During this posting, he commanded the Australian task group deployed to the Persian Gulf in early 2002 and also served as commander of the multinational naval forces conducting maritime interception operations to enforce UN sanctions on Iraq, including units from the RAN, the United States Navy, the Royal Navy and the Polish Armed Forces. He was appointed a Member of the Order of Australia for this service.

Goldrick's shore postings included serving as aide de camp to the Governor-General of Australia, as an instructor on the RAN's Principal Warfare Officer course, as officer-in-charge of the RAN's tactical development, tactical training and warfare officer training faculty, as research officer and later as chief staff officer to the Chief of Navy, as director of the RAN Sea Power Centre and as director-general of military strategy in the Australian Department of Defence. For his service, particularly at the Sea Power Centre, he was awarded the Conspicuous Service Cross.

Goldrick took command of the Australian Defence Force Academy in September 2003. He was promoted to rear admiral and assumed duties as Commander Border Protection in May 2006. In May 2008, he was appointed commander of joint education, training and warfare (a position retitled in 2009 as Commander Australian Defence College). After completing his posting in August 2011, he served as acting commandant of the Australian Defence Force Academy until March 2012. He was appointed an Officer of the Order of Australia in 2013.

== Naval scholarship and later life ==
Goldrick lectured in naval history and contemporary naval affairs at many institutions. He spent 1992 as a research scholar at the US Naval War College. He was a long-term and active member of the Australian Naval Institute, including a significant period on the institute's governing council, where he was president between 2005 and 2008. He was an overseas corresponding member of the Society for Nautical Research and served several terms as a councillor of the Navy Records Society. In 2017, his book, Before Jutland, was awarded the Anderson Medal of the Society for Nautical Research for the best book of naval or maritime history published in 2015, and he was appointed a Fellow of the Society in 2018. He was elected a Fellow of the Royal Historical Society in 2020. In March 2022, Goldrick was awarded the Hattendorf Prize by the United States Naval War College for distinguished academic achievement in publishing original research that contributes to a deeper historical understanding of the broad context and interrelationships involved in the roles, contributions, limitations, and uses of the sea services in history.

Goldrick was married to Ruth, with whom he had two sons. Goldrick died in Canberra on 17 March 2023, following treatment for lymphoma and leukemia.

== Published works ==
- The King's Ships Were at Sea: The War in the North Sea August 1914 – February 1915 (1984)
- Reflections on the Royal Australian Navy, edited by T.R. Frame, J.V.P. Goldrick, and P.D. Jones. (1991)
- Mahan is Not Enough: the Proceedings of a Conference on the works of Sir Julian Corbett and Admiral Sir Herbert Richmond, edited by James Goldrick and John B. Hattendorf (1995)
- No Easy Answers: The Development of the Navies of India, Pakistan, Bangladesh and Sri Lanka (1997)
- Struggling for a solution – the RAN and the acquisition of a surface to air missile capability by P. D. Jones and James Goldrick.
- Navies of South-East Asia: A Comparative Study, by James Goldrick and Jack McCaffrie.
- Before Jutland: The Naval War in Northern European Waters August 1914 – February 1915 (2015)
- After Jutland: The Naval War in Northern European Waters June 1916 - November 1918 (2018)

In addition, he had contributed to many other works, and to professional journals, including The United States Naval Institute Proceedings. As a junior officer he twice won the Guinness Prize of the British Naval Review. In 2018, he won the U.S. Chief of Naval Operations Naval History Essay contest with 'Anti-access for Sea Control: The British Mining Campaign in World War I'.

Among his important articles and chapter-length contributions were:

- With the Battle Cruisers, by Filson Young with an introduction by James Goldrick (1986, 2002)
- 'The Battleship Fleet: the Test of War, 1895–1919' in J. R. Hill, ed., The Oxford Illustrated History of the Royal Navy (1995).
- Admiral Sir Rosslyn Wemyss in Malcolm H. Murfett, ed., The First Sea Lords: From Fisher to Mountbatten (1995)
- 'Julian Corbett' and Rosslyn Wemyss' in The Oxford Dictionary of National Biography (2004)

Military offices
Preceded by Rear Admiral Davyd Thomas	Commander Australian Defence College; 2008–2011	Succeeded by Major General Craig Orme
Preceded by Air Commodore Julie Hammer	Commandant of the Australian Defence Force Academy; 2003–2006	Succeeded by Brigadier Brian Dawson
