= Mark Binskin =

Senior Royal Australian Air Force officer

Mark Donald Binskin
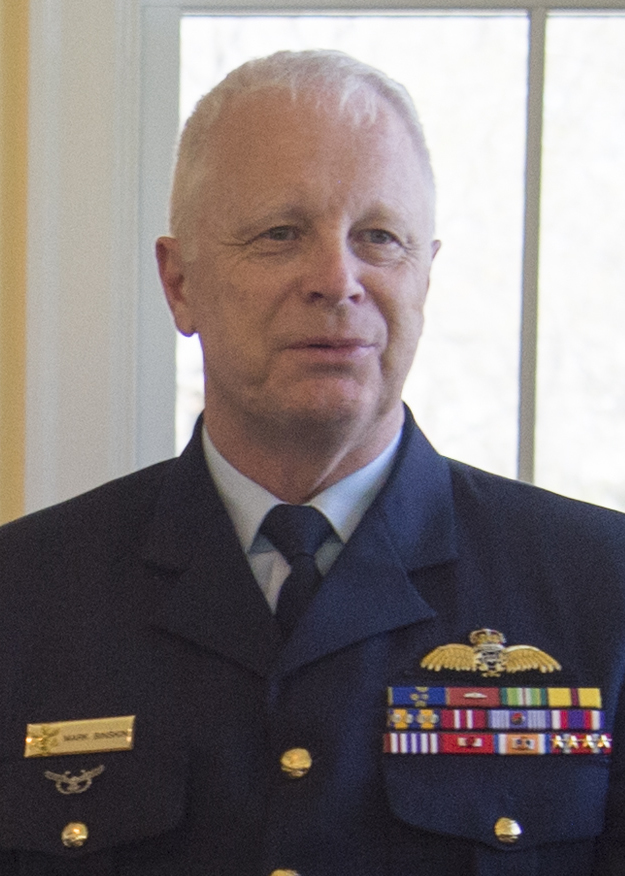
- Binskin in April 2018
- Born: 20 March 1960 (age 66); Sydney
- Military career
- Allegiance: Australia
- Branch: Royal Australian Navy (1978–84); Royal Australian Air Force (1984–2018); Royal Australian Air Force Reserve (2018-Present)
- Service years: 1978–Present
- Rank: Air Chief Marshal
- Commands: Chief of the Defence Force (2014–18); Vice Chief of Defence Force (2011–14); Chief of Air Force (2008–11); RAAF Air Command (2007–08); Air Combat Group (2004–05); No. 77 Squadron (1998–99)
- Conflicts: Iraq War; Operation Catalyst
- Awards: Companion of the Order of Australia; Commendation for Distinguished Service; Gugseon Medal of the Order of National Security Merit (South Korea); Distinguished Service Order (Singapore); Meritorious Service Medal (Singapore); Commander of the Legion of Honour (France); Commander of the Order of Orange-Nassau (Netherlands); Knight Grand Commander of the Order of Military Service (Malaysia); Commander of the Legion of Merit (United States)
- Other work: Commissioner and Chair of the Royal Commission into National Natural Disaster Arrangements

Air Chief Marshal Mark Donald Binskin, AC (born 20 March 1960) is a senior officer in the Royal Australian Air Force Reserve. He served as Chief of Air Force (2008–11), Vice Chief of the Defence Force (2011–14), and Chief of the Defence Force from June 2014 until his retirement in July 2018. In February 2020 he was appointed as a Commissioner and Chairman of the Royal Commission into National Natural Disaster Arrangements. He is the current chair of the Civil Aviation Safety Authority of Australia.

== Early life ==
Binskin was born on 20 March 1960 in Sydney and grew up in Campbelltown, New South Wales. He attended Campbelltown Public School, and completed secondary schooling at Hurlstone Agricultural High School.

== Military career ==
Binskin joined the Royal Australian Navy (RAN) in May 1978, and on completion of flying training was posted to fly A-4G Skyhawk aircraft at Naval Air Station HMAS Albatross. In January 1982, he was selected as the first RAN pilot to undergo an exchange with the Royal Australian Air Force (RAAF), flying Mirage III aircraft. On completion of this exchange, and with the disbanding of the Navy's fixed wing capability, he transferred to the RAAF in 1984.

Binskin served as the Commanding Officer of No. 77 Squadron at Williamtown during the period 1998 and 1999, and later Commander of Air Combat Group from 2004 until 2005.

Binskin's flying qualifications include Fighter Combat Instructor and Tactical Reconnaissance Pilot. Additionally, he has served as the RAAF F/A-18 Hornet Demonstration Pilot, and in this position represented the RAAF throughout Australia, Indonesia, Malaysia, Singapore and New Zealand, and has over 3,500 hours in single-seat fighter aircraft. He was awarded a Member of the Order of Australia for his performance in these two positions.

During the Australian contribution to the 2003 invasion of Iraq, Binskin served as Chief of Staff at Headquarters Australian Theatre. Following this, he served as the first dedicated non-United States Air Force Director of the US Central Air Force Combined Air and Space Operations Centre, where he was responsible for the conduct of all Coalition air operations in support of Operation Iraqi Freedom and Operation Enduring Freedom (ADF operations Catalyst and Slipper). For his leadership capabilities in this appointment, he was awarded a Commendation for Distinguished Service.

Binskin was appointed to the position of Air Commander Australia on 26 July 2007. He assumed the position of Chief of the Air Force (CAF) on 4 July 2008; upon assuming this appointment, he was promoted to air marshal on 4 July 2008.

Binskin was appointed an Officer of the Order of Australia in the 2010 Queens Birthday Honours for distinguished service to the Australian Defence Force in senior command and staff appointments. He has additionally been honoured with Singapore's Meritorious Service Medal, and the Gugseon Medal of the Order of National Security Merit from South Korea.

On 1 June 2011, it was announced that Binskin would be appointed Vice Chief of the Defence Force (VCDF) from 4 July for a term of three years in the Defence leadership change over. For his "eminent service to the Australian Defence Force" as CAF and VCDF, Binskin was advanced to a Companion of the Order of Australia in the 2014 Australia Day Honours.

On 4 April 2014, Prime Minister Tony Abbott announced that Binskin will take over as Chief of the Defence Force (CDF) when General David Hurley's term expires on 4 July 2014 and the current Chief of the Navy, Vice Admiral Ray Griggs will replace him as VCDF. The change of command occurred slightly earlier than advised, with Binskin promoted to air chief marshal and appointed CDF during a ceremony on 30 June.

In May 2024, Binskin visited Israel in his role as the Australian government's Special Adviser on Israel's response to the IDF attack on World Central Kitchen aid workers in Gaza (in which one Australian - Lalzawmi "Zomi" Frankcom - and six other people were killed). Binskin produced a report detailing his findings.

== Personal life ==
Binskin is married to Gitte. They have two sons. His interests include camping, motor sports, dancing and motorcycle riding.

== Honours and awards ==

Companion of the Order of Australia (AC)	26 January 2014
Officer of the Order of Australia (AO)	14 June 2010
Member of the Order of Australia (AM)	12 June 1989
Commendation for Distinguished Service	26 January 2005
Australian Active Service Medal	with 2 Clasps "IRAQ 2003" and "ICAT"
Iraq Medal	
Defence Force Service Medal with federation star	40–44 years service
Australian Defence Medal	
Gugseon Medal of the Order of National Security Merit (South Korea)	2010
Distinguished Service Order (Singapore)	21 August 2017
Meritorious Service Medal (Singapore)	8 June 2010.
Commander of the Legion of Honour (France)	April 2017
Chevalier of the Legion of Honour (France)	January 2015
Commander of the Order of Orange-Nassau (Netherlands)	19 May 2017
Knight Grand Commander of the Order of Military Service (Malaysia)	14 October 2017
Commander of the Legion of Merit (United States)	18 June 2018

Military offices
Preceded by General David Hurley	Chief of the Defence Force; 2014–2018	Succeeded by General Angus Campbell
Preceded by Lieutenant General David Hurley	Vice Chief of the Defence Force; 2011–2014	Succeeded by Vice Admiral Ray Griggs
Preceded by Air Marshal Geoff Shepherd	Chief of Air Force; 2008–2011	Succeeded by Air Marshal Geoff Brown
Preceded by Air Vice Marshal John Quaife	Air Commander Australia; 2007–2008	Succeeded by Air Vice Marshal Mark Skidmore
