= Steve Gilmore =

Steve or Steven Gilmore may refer to:

- Steve Gilmore (admiral), Royal Australian Navy officer
- Steve Gilmore (musician), American jazz double-bassist
- Steven R. Gilmore, Canadian artist and graphic designer
- Steven Gilmore Jr., American football cornerback
- Stephon Gilmore, American football cornerback

== See also ==
- Stephanie Gilmore, Australian surfer
