= Maritime Border Command =

Australia's principal civil maritime security agency

Agency overview
- Formed: 2005

Jurisdictional structure
- Operations jurisdiction: Australia
- Specialist jurisdiction: Coastal patrol, marine border protection, marine search and rescue

Operational structure
- Agency executive: Rear Admiral Brett Sonter
- Parent agency: Australian Border Force

Website
- www.abf.gov.au/about-us/what-we-do/border-protection/maritime

The Maritime Border Command (MBC) is Australia's principal civil maritime security agency, a de facto coast guard, operating in the maritime domain to ensure compliance with Australia's maritime legislation by foreign and domestic non-state actors. It is responsible for border protection in the exclusive economic zone of Australia and its 59,700 kilometres of coastline and issues such as illegal fishing and exploitation of natural resources, maritime terrorism and piracy, biosecurity threats, and marine pollution.

It is a multi-agency command within the Department of Home Affairs comprising both Australian Border Force (ABF) and Australian Defence Force (ADF) personnel, led by a rear admiral in the Royal Australian Navy. In 2024, Brett Sonter became the Commander of MBC.

The command was established in 2005 and was originally named the Joint Offshore Protection Command. In October 2006 it was renamed to Border Protection Command and was again retitled to its current name in July 2015 to coincide with the establishment of ABF.

== Structure ==
The MBC is a joint unit of the Australian Defence Force (the Royal Australian Navy Patrol Force and the Royal Australian Air Force Surveillance and Response Group) and the Australian Border Force (Marine Unit and Coastwatch aircraft). Its headquarters are in Canberra and is part of the Operations Group of the ABF. The ABF is part of the Australian Department of Home Affairs. Since September 2013, the MBC has supported the Operation Sovereign Borders Joint Agency Taskforce.

The ADF elements of MBC are commanded from Northern Command in Darwin, Northern Territory.

The Australian Federal Police supports the MBC and particularly the ABF with criminal investigations, law enforcement and national security matters.

== Role ==
The MBC delivers a coordinated national approach to offshore protection by operating as a single maritime surveillance, response and interception agency.

It detects and deters a wide range of illegal activities using a combination of ABF and ADF aircraft and vessels. ABF response assets include Coastwatch aircraft and Marine Unit patrol vessels. Its activities take place under a variety of legislation covering areas such as customs, fisheries, quarantine, immigration, environment and law enforcement.

The MBC is responsible for coordinating and controlling operations to protect Australia's national interests against the following maritime security threats:

- illegal exploitation of natural resources
- illegal activity in protected areas
- unauthorised maritime arrivals
- prohibited imports/exports
- maritime terrorism
- piracy
- compromise to bio-security
- marine pollution.

== Commanders ==
| Rank | Name | Term began | Term ended |
Commander Joint Offshore Protection Command
| Rear Admiral | Russ Crane CSM | March 2005 | May 2006 |
| Rear Admiral | James Goldrick AM, CSC | May 2006 | October 2006 |
Commander Border Protection Command
| Rear Admiral | James Goldrick AM, CSC | October 2006 | May 2008 |
| Rear Admiral | Allan du Toit AM | May 2008 | February 2010 |
| Rear Admiral | Tim Barrett AM, CSC | February 2010 | December 2011 |
| Rear Admiral | David Johnston AM | December 2011 | December 2013 |
| Rear Admiral | Michael Noonan AM | December 2013 | 14 January 2016 |
Commander Maritime Border Command
| Rear Admiral | Peter Laver AM | 14 January 2016 | January 2019 |
| Rear Admiral | Lee Goddard CSC | 28 January 2019 | December 2020 |
| Rear Admiral | Mark Hill AM, CSC | December 2020 | 4 February 2022 |
| Rear Admiral | Justin Jones CSC | 4 February 2022 | 10 January 2024 |
| Rear Admiral | Brett Sonter | 10 January 2024 | |
