= Brian Dawson (general) =

- Born: 1954 (age 71–72); Traralgon, Victoria
- Military career
- Allegiance: Australia
- Branch: Australian Army
- Service years: 1973–2013
- Rank: Major General
- Commands: Australian Defence College (2007); Australian Defence Force Academy (2006–07); Base Administrative Support Centre (1995–96)
- Conflicts: United Nations Operation in Somalia II; Operation Trek; Iraq War
- Awards: Member of the Order of Australia; Conspicuous Service Cross
- Other work: Assistant Director, Australian War Memorial (2017–26)

Major General Brian Robert Dawson, AM, CSC (born 1954) is a retired senior officer of the Australian Army and a former museum administrator. He joined the army via the Royal Military College, Duntroon in 1973 and was commissioned into the Royal Australian Infantry Corps. He commanded the Base Administrative Support Centre (1995–96), Australian Defence Force Academy (2006–07) and Australian Defence College (2007), deployed on operations to Somalia and the Solomon Islands, and was Deputy Commander Joint Task Force 633 – Iraq from 2007 to 2008. He also served as Director General of Defence Public Affairs (2008–10) and, from 2010 to 2013, was Australia's first Military Representative to NATO and the European Union. Following his retirement from the army, Dawson joined the Australian War Memorial where he served as Assistant Director, National Collection from 2017 to 2026.

== Early life ==
Dawson was born in Traralgon, Victoria, in 1954, and completed his secondary education in Rochester, Victoria.

== Military career ==
Dawson entered the Royal Military College, Duntroon as an Australian Army officer cadet in January 1973. He graduated with a Bachelor of Arts in Military Studies from the affiliated University of New South Wales in December 1976 and was commissioned a lieutenant in the Royal Australian Infantry Corps. Following a series of regimental and staff appointments, including as a platoon commander in the 3rd Battalion, Royal Australian Regiment, Dawson was selected into the Special Air Service Regiment (SASR) as a troop commander in 1980. His time with the special forces included a two-year secondment as a staff officer with the Special Air Service Group in the United Kingdom. He returned to the SASR as an operations officer from 1984, before assuming command of the counter terrorist squadron in 1986.

As a lieutenant colonel, Dawson deployed to Mogadishu as Senior Staff Officer Plans on Headquarters United Nations Operation in Somalia II in October 1993. Dawson later remarked that "the United Nations probably had an impossible task there." He arrived in Somalia in the immediate aftermath of the Battle of Mogadishu, at which point the United Nations "force was basically in shock". He returned to Australia in May 1994 and, in recognition of his "conspicuous service" in Somalia, was awarded the Conspicuous Service Cross in the 1995 Australia Day Honours.

Dawson commanded the Base Administrative Support Centre in North Queensland from 1995 to 1996 and was Colonel Operations in Support Command Australia (Army) from 1997 to 1999. Dawson was appointed a Member of the Order of Australia in the 2000 Australia Day Honours in recognition of his "exceptional service to the Australian Army in the fields of Operations, Logistics and Administration". Later that year, he deployed to the Solomon Islands as commander of the Australian contingent on Operation Trek, the Australian contribution to the International Peace Monitoring Team. Following his return to Australia, Dawson served as Director General Preparedness at Australian Defence Force Headquarters from 2001 to 2002, was chief of staff at Headquarters Land Command from 2003 to 2005, and commandant of the Australian Defence Force Academy from 2006 to 2007. He was then acting commander of the Australian Defence College from April to August 2007. That November, he deployed to Baghdad as Deputy Commander Joint Task Force 633 – Iraq. In this role, Dawson was responsible for Australian military operations in Iraq as part of Operation Catalyst, Australia's contribution to the Iraq War.

Dawson returned to Australia in May 2008 and was appointed Director General Defence Public Affairs. In 2010, he was promoted major general and posted to Brussels as the first Australian Military Representative to NATO and the European Union. Dawson's role was to represent Australia's interests to NATO and the European Union, specifically in respect to Australia's contribution to Afghanistan. During the three-year posting, Dawson also negotiated a logistic support agreement between Australia and NATO. He relinquished the position in 2013 and, on his return to Australia, retired from the Australian Army after 40 years of service.

== Post-military career ==
Following his retirement from the army Dawson was, from May to October 2013, part of a consultant project team that designed a plan for a grain harvest management scheme for the New South Wales Department of Transport. In December that year, he joined the Australian War Memorial (AWM) as Executive Manager Anzac Centenary Travelling Exhibition. Dawson supervised the Spirit of Anzac Centenary Experience, a travelling exhibition designed as a major feature of the Australian government's national commemoration of the centenary of the First World War. The exhibition ended in April 2017 and, following a brief period as the AWM's Head of Collection Services, Dawson was appointed Assistant Director, National Collection in December 2017. As head of the National Collection Branch, Dawson oversaw the acquisition and conservation of material in the AWM's National Collection. He formally retired from the AWM in May 2026.

== Personal life ==
Dawson is married to Jacqui and has two children. He holds a Master of Arts in Strategic Studies from La Trobe University.

Military offices
Preceded by Major General David Morrison	Commander Australian Defence College (Acting); 2007	Succeeded by Rear Admiral Davyd Thomas
Preceded by Commodore James Goldrick	Commandant of the Australian Defence Force Academy; 2006–2007	Succeeded by Brigadier Wayne Goodman
