= Peter Jones (admiral) =

Peter David Jones
- Born: 1957 (age 68–69); Sydney, New South Wales
- Military career
- Allegiance: Australia
- Branch: Royal Australian Navy
- Service years: 1974–2014
- Rank: Vice Admiral
- Commands: Chief Capability Development Group; Australian Surface Task Group; HMAS Melbourne
- Conflicts: War in Afghanistan; Iraq War
- Awards: Officer of the Order of Australia; Distinguished Service Cross; Legionnaire of the Legion of Merit (United States)
- Other work: President Australian Naval Institute

Vice Admiral Peter David Jones (born 1957) is a retired senior officer in the Royal Australian Navy (RAN), who served as the Chief Capability Development Group (CCDG) from 2011 until his retirement in October 2014. He was succeeded as CCDG by Lieutenant General John Caligari.

== Early life and education ==
Peter Jones was born in Sydney, New South Wales, to Patricia (née Matthews) and Lloyd Arthur Jones in 1957. He is married to Rhonda Payget with whom he has two sons. He holds a Bachelor of Arts and Master of Arts from the University of New South Wales. He attended the six-week Advanced Management Program at Harvard Business School.

== Career ==
Jones joined the Royal Australian Navy as a midshipman in 1974. He is qualified as a surface warfare specialist.

During Jones's career he has commanded HMAS Melbourne (for which he was made a Member of the Order of Australia), the RAN Task Group in the Persian Gulf and the multinational Maritime Interception Force (MIF) (for which he was awarded a Distinguished Service Cross and the US Legion of Merit). He has also served as the Maritime Interception Operations Screen Commander for the 2003 invasion of Iraq, Commander Australian Surface Task Group, Commander Australian Navy Systems Command, Head of ICT Operations/Strategic J6 and Head Capability Systems.

Jones was promoted to the rank of vice admiral and appointed to the position of Chief Capability Development Group in late November 2011, making him at that time the second most senior officer in the RAN behind the Chief of Navy, Vice Admiral Ray Griggs.

Jones was advanced to an Officer of the Order of Australia in the 2012 Queen's Birthday Honours list, "For distinguished service as Head Information and Communications Technology Operations and Head Capability Systems in the Capability Development Group".

Since the late 1970s Jones has written on maritime strategy and Australian naval history. On his retirement from the Navy in 2014 Jones completed the book Australia's Argonauts detailing the story of the first class of officers to join the Royal Australian Naval College. It was published in 2016 to coincide with the centenary of when that class graduated from the Naval College.

Jones is president of the Australian Naval Institute and an adjunct professor in the Naval Studies Group at the University of New South Wales (Canberra campus).

== Published works ==
Books and journals authored or edited by Jones:

- Australia's Navy, AGPS, Canberra, inaugural Executive Editor (1989–1991).
- Reflections of the RAN, co-edited with James Goldrick and Tom Frame (1991).
- Australia's Argonauts: The remarkable story of the first class to enter the Royal Australian Naval College (2016).
- Guy Griffiths: The Life and Times of an Australian Admiral (2021).

Book chapters:

- The Royal Australian Navy, Volume III – The Australian Centenary History of Defence, Oxford University Press, 2001. Chapters spanning 1972–1991.
- The Face of Naval Battle: The Human Experience of Modern War at Sea, Edited John Reeve and David Stevens, Allen and Unwin, 2003, Chapter on Future Naval Battle.
- Positioning Navies for the Future, Seapower Centre Australia, Canberra, 2006. Chapter – "Littoral Warfare Today and in the Future".
- Australian Dictionary of Biography entries for Vice Admiral Sir John Collins, Rear Admiral Sir David Martin and Captain James Esdaile (to be published), Australian National University.
- Presence, Power Projection and Sea Control: The RAN in the Gulf 1990–2009, Sea Power Centre in Australia, 2009. Chapter on Task Group Command.
- Naval Power And Expeditionary Wars: Peripheral Campaigns And New Theatres Of Naval Warfare, edited by Bruce Elleman, Rutledge, 2010, contributed chapter on Iraq 2003.
- Australian Naval Command and Leadership in Recent Operations, Edited by John Perryman & Andrew Forbes, Seapower Centre Australia, 2014.
- The War at Sea 1914–18, edited by Andrew Forbes, Seapower Centre Australia, 2015.

Articles:

- Australian Naval Institute Journal, "Australian Naval Institute in 1991 – A Discussion Paper on Future Options", Lieutenant Commander Peter Jones, RAN & Lieutenant Tom Frame, RAN, Vol. 17 No. 1 February 1991.
- Australian Naval Institute Journal, "Women in Surface Combatants", Vol. 19 No. 4, November 1993.
- Australian Naval Institute Journal, "Change Management in the RAN: Making it Better," Vol. 20 No. 4 January 1995.
- Niobe Papers Volume 7, Edited by F.W. Crickard and G.L. Witol, The Naval Officers Association of Canada, 1995, Paper – "The RAN and the Naval Reserve."
- Maritime Security Working Papers Number 3, May 1996, Multi-National Operations: Their Demands and Impact on Medium Power Navies, Centre for Foreign Policy Studies, Dalhousie University, Halifax, Canada.
- Australian Naval Institute Journal, "The need for a ship design philosophy in the RAN", Vol. 25 No. 2 June 1999.
- Australian Naval Institute Journal, "Maritime Interception Operations Screen Commander in the Gulf, Parts 1 & 2: Operation Slipper", Winter and Spring Editions 2003.
- United States Naval Institute Proceedings, "A Farewell to the Gulf"; October 2004.
- Australian Defence Force Journal, "Advanced in Information Communications Technology & their Impact on future ADF Commanders", Issue 176, 2008.
- Australian Defence Force Journal, "In the Wake of an Admiral: Some Reflections on Sea Command in the Modern Era", Issue 184, 2011.

Working Papers/monographs:

- Struggle For A Solution: The RAN and the Acquisition of a Surface to Air Missile Capability, Sea Power Centre Working Paper No.2., P.D. Jones & J.V.P. Goldrick, 2000.
- Task Group Command, Centre for Defence Command, Leadership and Management Studies, Command papers, No. 3, 2004.

Contributed drawings to:

- Jane's Fighting Ships (1979–1989).
- Vanguard to Trident: British Naval Policy Since World War II, Eric Grove, US Naval Institute Press, 1987.
- King's Ships Were At Sea, J.V.P. Goldrick, US Naval Institute Press, 1984.

== Notes ==
Military offices
Preceded by Air Marshal John Harvey	Chief Capability Development Group; 2011–2014	Succeeded by Lieutenant General John Caligari
