= Tim Barrett (admiral) =

Senior officer in the Royal Australian Navy (retired)

Timothy William Barrett
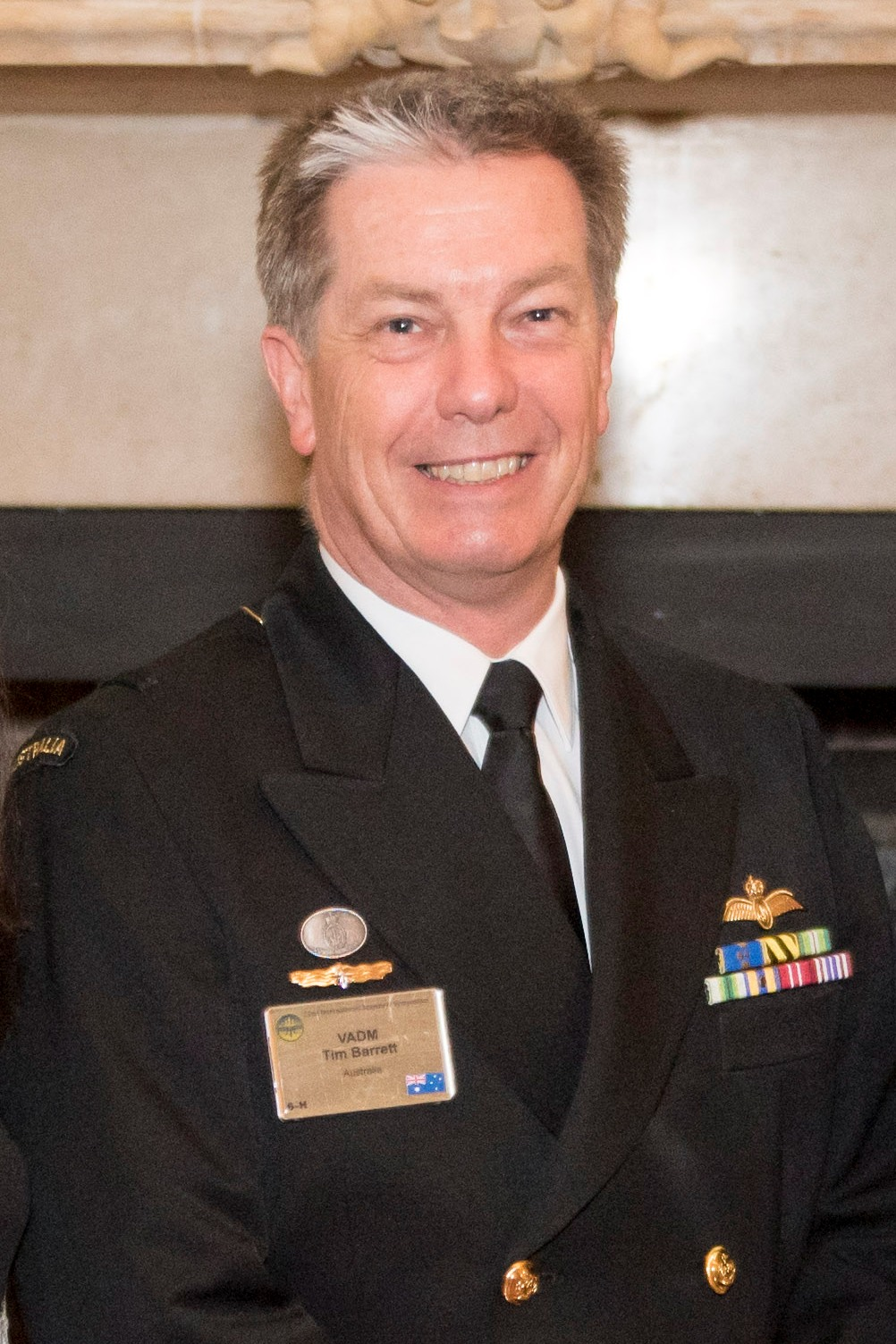
- Tim Barrett in September 2016
- Born: 8 January 1959 (age 67); Helston, England
- Military career
- Allegiance: Australia
- Branch: Royal Australian Navy Reserve
- Service years: 1976–Present
- Rank: Vice Admiral
- Commands: Chief of Navy; Commander Australian Fleet; Border Protection Command; Defence Force Recruiting; Navy Aviation Group; HMAS Albatross; 817 Squadron RAN
- Awards: Officer of the Order of Australia; Conspicuous Service Cross; Meritorious Service Medal (Singapore); Officer of Legion of Honour (France)

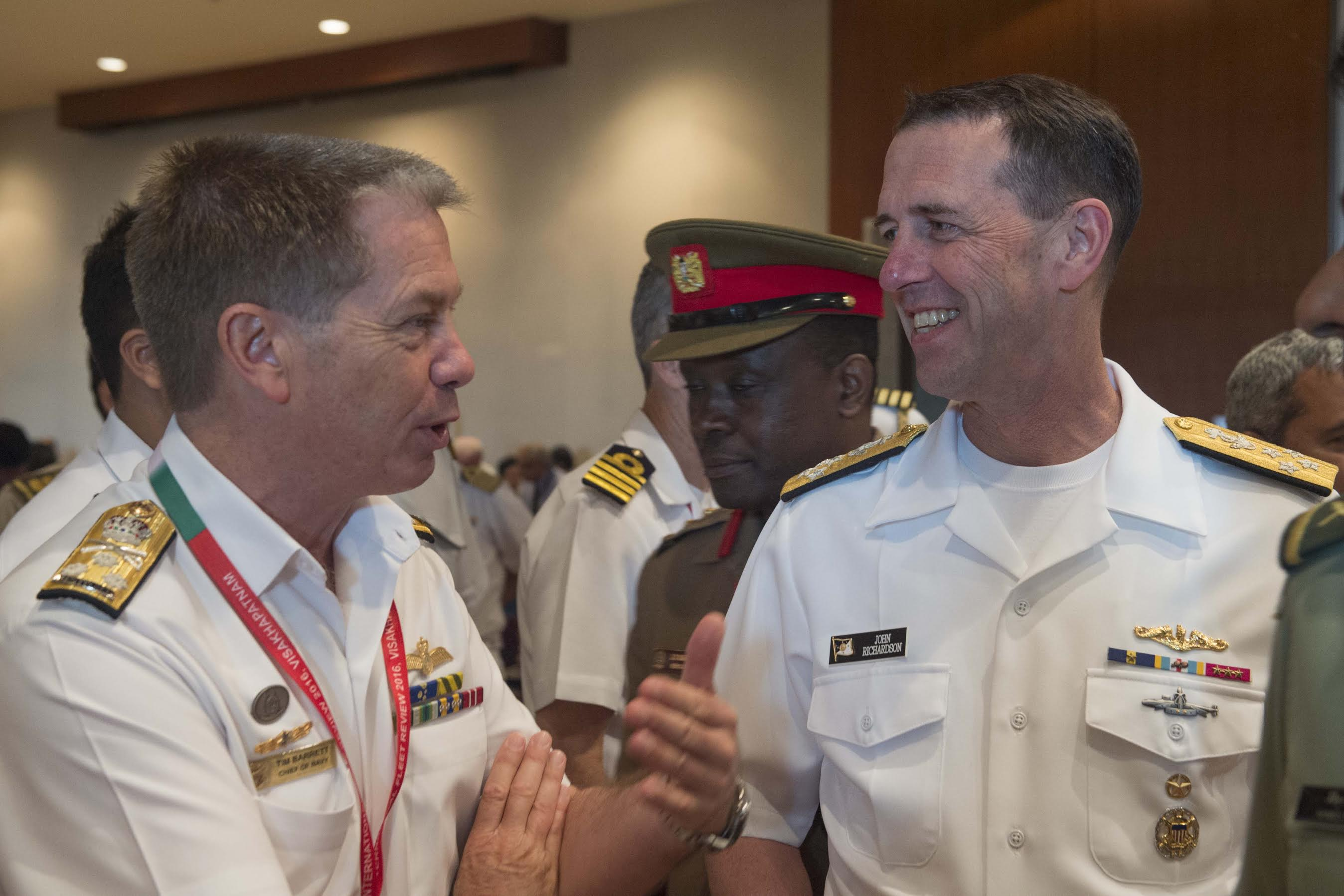
Tim Barrett (left) with Admiral John Richardson of the USN in February 2016

Vice Admiral Timothy William Barrett, AO, CSC (born 8 January 1959) is a senior officer in the Royal Australian Navy Reserve. Barrett served as Commander Australian Fleet from 2011 to 2014, before being appointed Chief of Navy in June 2014. He retired in July 2018 after four years as navy chief and 42 years in the navy.

== Early life ==
Barrett was born in the Cornwall parish of Helston, England, on 8 January 1959. He emigrated to Australia, aged 11, in 1970.

== Military career ==
Barrett received a Bachelor of Arts in history and politics as well as a Master of Defence Studies from the University of New South Wales.

Barrett has served as both aircrew with the Fleet Air Arm and as a seaman officer on a number of ships, including as flight commander aboard HMAS Stalwart, HMAS Adelaide and HMAS Canberra.

Barrett assumed command of Border Protection Command on 9 February 2010, succeeding Rear Admiral Allan du Toit.

On 4 April 2014, Barrett's promotion to vice admiral and selection to succeed Ray Griggs as Chief of Navy (CN) was announced, to take place mid-year. He was subsequently advanced in rank during a ceremony presided by General David Hurley on 24 June, and assumed command as CN six days later. Barrett transferred to the Royal Australian Navy Reserve on 1 September 2018, and was succeeded as CN by Vice Admiral Michael Noonan.

Barrett played a key role in choosing Britain's Type 26 Frigate offering before later becoming a paid advisor to BAE Systems Australia - the builder of the ship.

== Honours and awards ==

Ribbon	Description	Notes
	Officer of the Order of Australia (AO)	(9 June 2014)
	Member of the Order of Australia (AM)	(26 January 2009)
	Conspicuous Service Cross (CSC)	(26 January 2006)
	Australian Active Service Medal	
	Australian Service Medal	
	Defence Force Service Medal with Federation Star	for 40–44 years service
	Australian Defence Medal	
	Meritorious Service Medal (Singapore)	(28 June 2016)
	Officer of Legion of Honour (France)	(22 February 2017)

Military offices
Preceded by Vice Admiral Ray Griggs	Chief of Navy; 2014–2018	Succeeded by Vice Admiral Michael Noonan
Preceded by Rear Admiral Steve Gilmore	Commander Australian Fleet; 2011–2014	Succeeded by Rear Admiral Stuart Mayer
Preceded by Rear Admiral Allan du Toit	Border Protection Command; 2010–2011	Succeeded by Rear Admiral David Johnston
