= Nigel Coates (admiral) =

Royal Australian Navy admiral

Nigel Stephen Coates
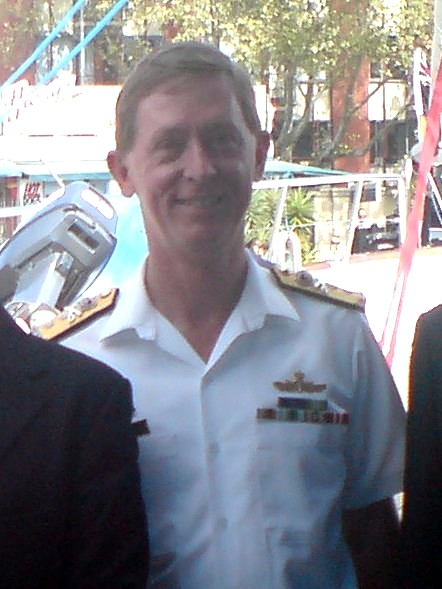
- Rear Admiral Nigel Coates in March 2008
- Born: 8 March 1959
- Died: 2 June 2010 (aged 51); Canberra, Australian Capital Territory
- Military career
- Allegiance: Australia
- Branch: Royal Australian Navy
- Service years: 1975–2010
- Rank: Rear Admiral
- Commands: Commander Australian Fleet (2007–09); Director General Navy Personnel (2005–07); Director General Australian Navy Cadets (2005–07); HMAS Anzac (2001–02); HMAS Canberra (1996–98)
- Conflicts: Gulf War; War in Afghanistan; Operation Slipper
- Awards: Member of the Order of Australia

Rear Admiral Nigel Stephen Coates, AM (8 March 1959 – 2 June 2010) was a senior officer in the Royal Australian Navy.

== Early life and education ==
Coates joined the Royal Australian Naval College at Jervis Bay in 1975 as a Junior Entry officer, where he completed his high school education.

Coates spent 18 months in Newport, Rhode Island, where he attended the US Naval War College and earned a Master of Arts (International Relations) from Salve Regina University.

== Naval career ==
Coates joined the Royal Australian Navy in 1975. During the first 15 years of his career he served as aide-de-camp to the Governor General, received Principal Warfare Officer and other training, served on HMA Ships Hobart, Adelaide, Brisbane and Darwin, and at Maritime Headquarters (MHQ) in Sydney.

In 1993, he was promoted to commander and served at the Australian Defence Force Academy, initially as Senior Military Instructor, and then as Commanding Officer of the Corps of Officer Cadets. In 1996, he assumed command of HMAS Canberra. In 1998, he assumed command of Sea Training at MHQ, and in 1999 attended the US Naval War College.

In 2001, he was promoted to captain and assumed command of HMAS Anzac, which saw operational deployment in the Persian Gulf; Coates was subsequently appointed a Member of the Order of Australia for this service.

In mid-2002 he was appointed Chief of Staff to the Chief of the Defence Force in Canberra, and in late 2003 he was promoted to commodore and appointed Chief of Staff, at Headquarters Australian Theatre in Sydney. In 2005, he returned to Canberra as Director General, Navy Personnel and Training.

In July 2007, he was promoted to rear admiral and appointed Commander Australian Fleet. He relinquished command of the Fleet in October 2009 and was relieved by Rear Admiral Steve Gilmore.

== Personal ==
According to his official biography, "Coates and his wife Vickie enjoy sailing and have three children who also enjoy sailing – occasionally."

In 1996, while sailing in the Australian Capital Territory, he suffered a traumatic amputation of the top of his ring finger.

Coates was diagnosed with an aggressive brain cancer in late 2009, shortly after relinquishing command of the Australian Fleet. He died on 2 June 2010, aged 51, at the Medical Centre, Royal Military College, Duntroon, in Canberra. The funeral service with full naval honours was held in the Naval Dockyard Chapel, Garden Island, on 9 June 2010.

== Honours and awards ==
- Queen's Gold Medal (Dux of RAN Initial Training course)
- Jubilee Sword (Dux of Seamen Officers training course)
- 1991 Maritime Commander's Commendation
- 1995 Chief of the Defence Force Commendation
- 1997 Gloucester Cup (Commanding officer, HMAS Canberra)
- 2001 Gloucester Cup (Commanding Officer, HMAS Anzac)

Member of the Order of Australia (AM)	Australia Day Honours List 2003
Australian Active Service Medal	with 1 clasp
Afghanistan Medal	
Australian Service Medal	with 2 (?) clasps
Defence Force Service Medal with 4 clasps	35–39 years service
Australian Defence Medal	

== References and notes ==
Military offices
Preceded by Rear Admiral Davyd Thomas	Commander Australian Fleet; 2007–2009	Succeeded by Rear Admiral Steve Gilmore
New command	Director General of the Australian Navy Cadets; 2005–2007	Succeeded by Commodore Karel de Laat
