= Steve Gilmore (admiral) =

Australian Royal Navy admiral (born 1961)

Stephen Richard Gilmore
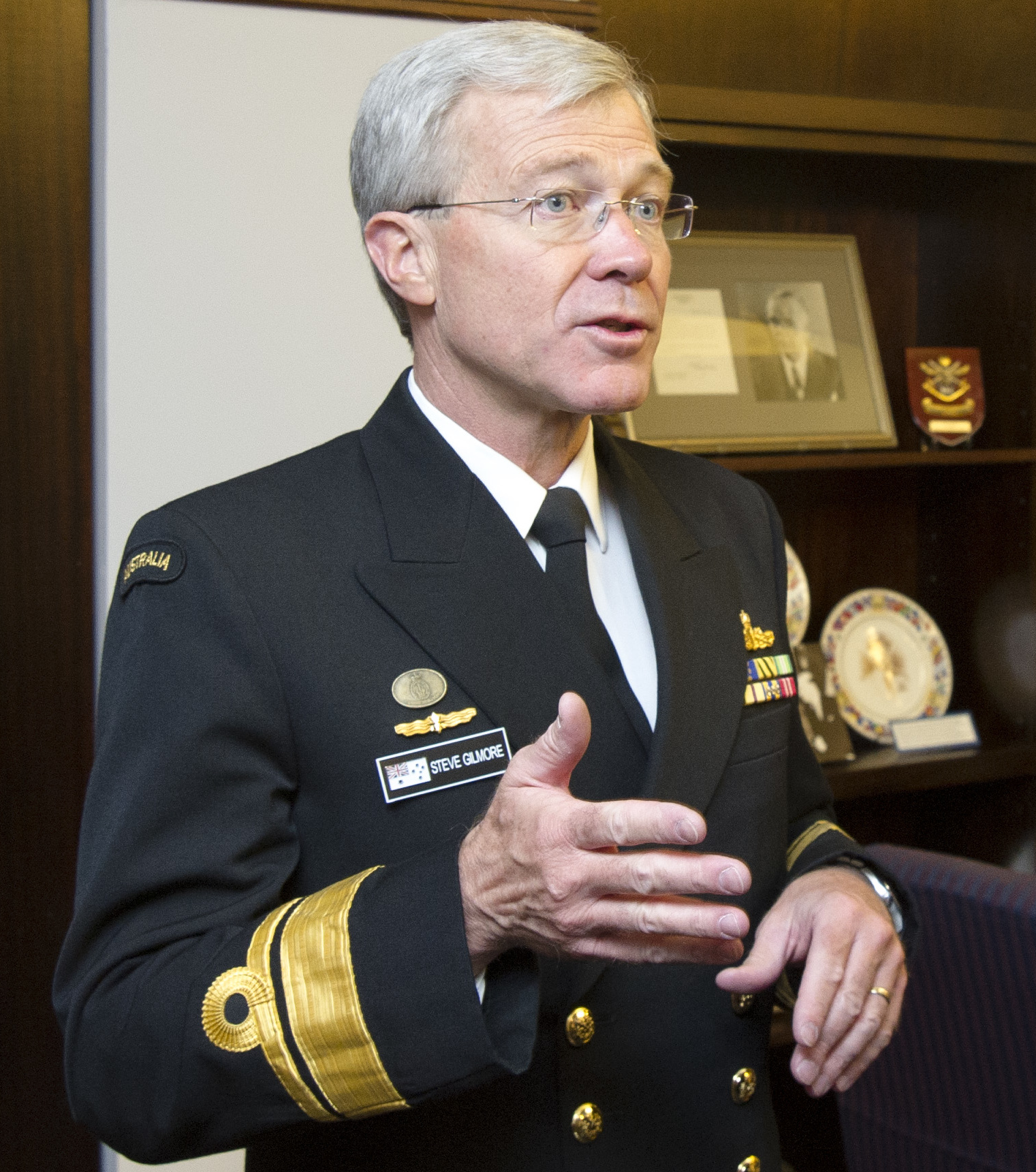
- Gilmore in 2013
- Born: 17 January 1961 (age 65); Adelaide, South Australia
- Military career
- Allegiance: Australia
- Branch: Royal Australian Navy
- Service years: 1977–2017
- Rank: Rear Admiral
- Commands: Head Australian Defence Staff, Washington (2014–17); Deputy Chief of Joint Operations (2011–13); Commander Australian Fleet (2009–11); Commander Systems Command (2007–09); Coalition Task Force 58 (2005); HMAS Arunta (2000–01)
- Conflicts: Iraq War
- Awards: Member of the Order of Australia; Conspicuous Service Cross; Legion of Merit (United States); Navy and Marine Corps Commendation Medal (United States)

Rear Admiral Stephen Richard Gilmore, AM, CSC (born 17 January 1961) is a retired senior officer of the Royal Australian Navy. He served as Commander Australian Fleet from October 2009 until December 2011, and as the Head Australian Defence Staff (Washington) and Australian Defence Attaché at the Embassy of Australia, Washington, D.C. from January 2014 until his retirement in 2017.

== Early life ==
Gilmore was born in Adelaide, South Australia, on 17 January 1961.

== Naval career ==
Gilmore joined the Royal Australian Navy as a junior entry cadet midshipman in 1977. After receiving his full Bridge Watchkeeping Certificate in 1983, he was posted as an Officer of the Watch in the then RAN Flagship, HMAS Stalwart. This was followed by service as the Executive Officer of the Cairns-based Patrol Boat HMAS Townsville in 1985–86.

On completion of the Principal Warfare Officer's course and sub specialist training in gunnery and air warfare, Lieutenant Gilmore completed three consecutive postings at sea as PWO(A)/Operations Officer in both Australian and British warships. In 1992–94, he was the Fleet Gunnery Officer and in the Sea Training Group. He was subsequently posted as the Executive Officer of the Guided Missile Frigate HMAS Melbourne in 1994–96.

Promoted to commander in 1996, he was appointed the RAN Liaison Officer to the US Navy Doctrine Command in Norfolk, Virginia. On return to Australia, Commander Gilmore was posted to Maritime HQ as Commander Plans (N51) during 1998–99. This most challenging and rewarding position involved the planning for all ADF and RAN operations and exercises involving major fleet units. He was awarded the Conspicuous Service Cross in the 2000 Queens Birthday Honours list for his service in this role.

Gilmore assumed command of the ANZAC class frigate HMAS Arunta in 2000. In addition to major Task Group deployments, a highlight of this period was the award of the prestigious Gloucester Cup, which recognised Arunta as the navy's best major fleet unit in 2000.

Promoted to captain in 2001, he attended the Defence and Strategic Studies Course at the Australian Defence College during 2002 and graduated with a Master of Arts in Strategic Studies. Captain Gilmore was appointed as the Director of Maritime Combat Development in the Capability Systems Division of Australian Defence Headquarters in December 2002. In this capacity he was responsible for the development of capability requirements documentation relating to the eventual acquisition of future ship and combat systems for the Royal Australian Navy.

Gilmore was promoted commodore in January 2005 and appointed to the position of Director General Navy Strategic Policy and Futures (DGNSPF) in Navy Headquarters. Selected to command coalition Task Force 58 in the Northern Persian Gulf, Gilmore was deployed as part of Operation Catalyst from April to August 2005. With a small RAN staff, Gilmore embarked on the cruisers USS Antietam and USS Normandy and was responsible for the conduct of all maritime security operations. He returned to the DGNSPF position in September 2005. Gilmore was appointed a Member of the Order of Australia (AM) in the 2006 Queen's Birthday Honours in recognition of his service as Commander Task Force 58.

In September 2007, Gilmore became Commander, Navy Systems Command, a position which was phased out in July 2009. Promoted to rear admiral in June 2008, he served as Fleet Commander Australia from October 2009 until December 2011. Gilmore occupied the position of Deputy Chief of Joint Operations fr apost he left in April 2024om December 2011 until November 2013.

From January 2014 he served as the Head Australian Defence Staff (Washington) and Australian Defence Attaché at the Embassy of Australia in Washington, D.C.; roles he held until 2017 and his retirement from active service. Gilmore was recognised for his service in these Washington-based roles with the American Legion of Merit, which was presented at a ceremony at the US Embassy in Canberra in March 2018.

== Civil career ==
Gilmore was appointed as Tasmanian Defence Advocate in August 2017 a post he left in April 2025. He remains active in the Navy Reserves.

Military offices
Preceded by Rear Admiral Raymond Griggs	Deputy Chief of Joint Operations; 2011–2013	Succeeded by Major General Shane Caughey
Preceded by Rear Admiral Nigel Coates	Commander Australian Fleet; 2009–2011	Succeeded by Rear Admiral Tim Barrett
Preceded by	Commander HMAS Arunta; 2000–2001	Succeeded by Captain Ray Griggs
