= Angus Campbell (general) =

Australian general

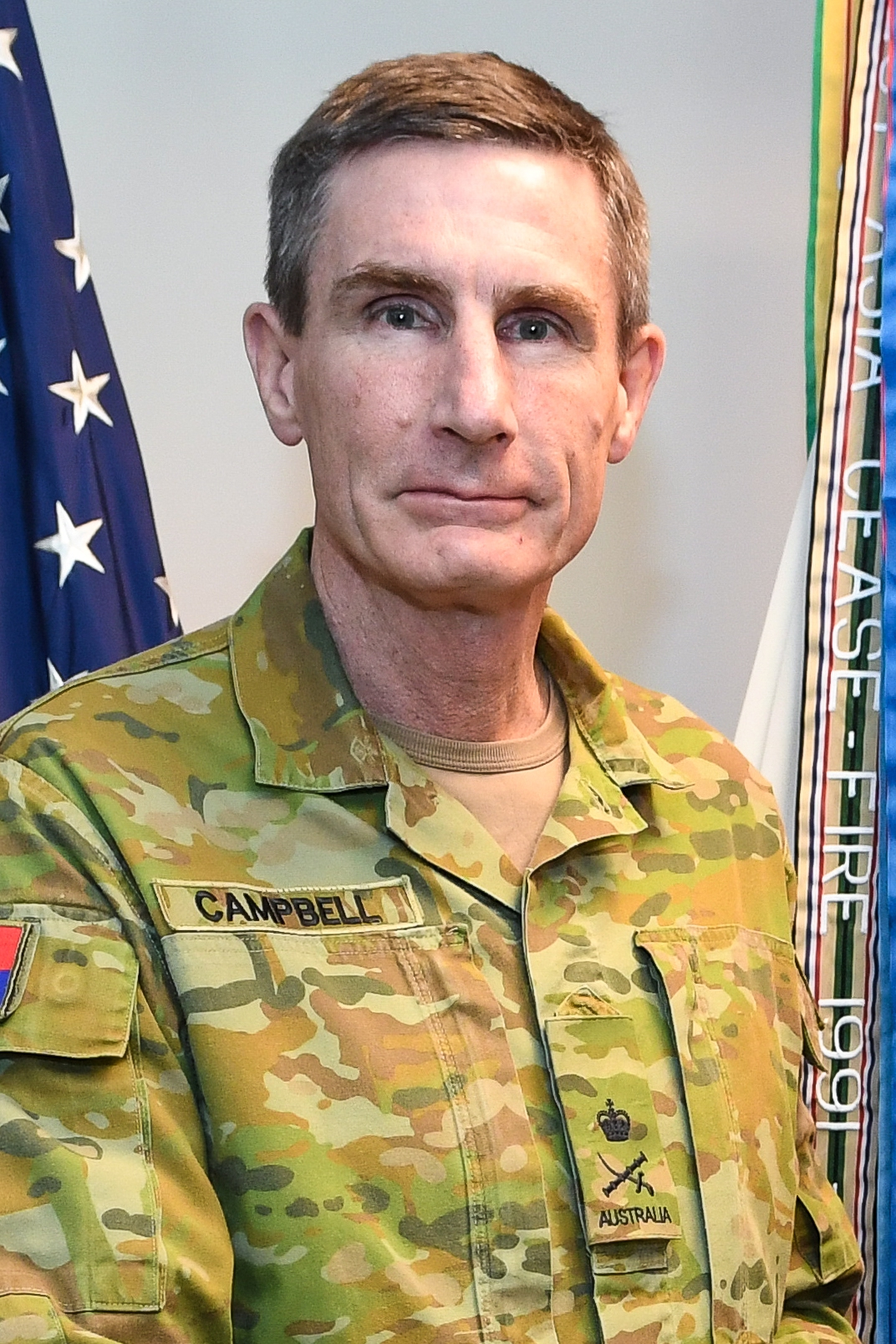
- Lieutenant General Angus Campbell in 2017

Ambassador of Australia to Belgium, Luxembourg, the European Union and NATO
- Incumbent
- Assumed office 12 March 2025
- Preceded by: Caroline Millar

Military service
- Allegiance: Australia
- Branch/service: Australian Army
- Years of service: 1981–2024
- Rank: General
- Unit: Royal Australian Infantry Corps
- Commands: Chief of the Defence Force (2018–24); Chief of Army (2015–18); Operation Sovereign Borders (2013–15); Deputy Chief of Army (2012–13); Joint Task Force 633 (2011–12); 2nd Battalion, Royal Australian Regiment (2001–03)
- Battles/wars: United Nations Transitional Administration in East Timor; War in Afghanistan
- Awards: Officer of the Order of Australia; Distinguished Service Cross; Commander of the Legion of Merit (United States); Distinguished Service Order (Singapore); Meritorious Service Medal (Singapore); Commander of the National Order of Merit (France); Commander of the Legion of Honour (France)

General Angus John Campbell is a retired senior officer in the Australian Army, who served as the Chief of the Defence Force from 6 July 2018 until 10 July 2024. He was previously posted as Commander Operation Sovereign Borders from September 2013 until he was appointed Chief of Army in May 2015.

== Military career ==
Campbell attended St Gregory's College, Campbelltown before entering the Royal Military College, Duntroon in 1981, receiving a commission as an infantry lieutenant in 1984. Initially assigned to the 3rd Battalion, Royal Australian Regiment as a platoon commander, he later passed selection for the Special Air Service Regiment, with which he served as troop and squadron commander. Campbell commanded the 2nd Battalion, Royal Australian Regiment in East Timor as part of the United Nations Transitional Administration in East Timor (UNTAET), for which was appointed a Member of the Order of Australia (AM) in 2003.

Campbell served as Chief of Staff to General Peter Cosgrove and later Air Chief Marshal Angus Houston during their respective tenures as Chief of the Defence Force. In 2005, he left the full-time army and assumed a senior civilian appointment as First Assistant Secretary in the Office of National Security within the Department of the Prime Minister and Cabinet. Campbell was later promoted to Deputy Secretary, and served as Deputy National Security Adviser for a period before returning to the army in 2010.

Campbell was promoted to the rank of major general and appointed as Commander Joint Task Force 633 in 2011, responsible for all Australian forces deployed in the Middle East, including Afghanistan. For his command in Afghanistan he was awarded the Distinguished Service Cross. He was appointed the Deputy Chief of Army in February 2012.

Campbell was promoted to lieutenant general on 19 September 2013 and appointed to oversee Operation Sovereign Borders, part of the Abbott government's immigration policy aimed at stopping maritime arrivals of asylum seekers to Australia.

In March 2015, Prime Minister Tony Abbott announced Campbell would be appointed Chief of Army from May of that year, taking over from the retiring Lieutenant General David Morrison.

On 16 April 2018, Prime Minister Malcolm Turnbull announced that Campbell would be promoted to general and succeed Air Chief Marshal Mark Binskin as Chief of the Defence Force. The change of command occurred on 6 July. In the meantime, one of Campbell's last acts as the Chief of Army was to order the removal of "death imagery" from patches and badges.

On 19 November 2020 the Brereton Report was publicly released following a four-year investigation into alleged Australian war crimes by special forces units whom were taking part in the War in Afghanistan between 2006 and 2016. On that same day Campbell announced at a press conference that the 2 Squadron, Special Air Service Regiment would be disbanded and struck from the army's order of battle. He also apologised for "any wrong doing by Australian soldiers" and said a "distorted culture" existed in the Australian Defence Force.

In June 2022, Campbell's tenure as Chief of the Defence Force was extended for a further two years.

In late November 2022, Campbell gave officers of Captain to Brigadier rank "28 days to prove their service in the Afghanistan war was distinguished". Up to 3,000 Australian Defence Force members are potentially facing having their medals revoked. At the time of the most serious allegations in 2012, Campbell was serving as the Commander Joint Task Force 633, for which he was awarded the Distinguished Service Cross. This has led to calls for Campbell to be stripped of his decoration due to findings of the Brereton Report and due to a perceived error in the original citation. "In the citation on his Distinguished Service Cross, he said he was given that award for 'distinguished command and leadership in action' – the key phrase is 'in action' and what that means is he was serving in action against the enemy in combat in Afghanistan."

In July 2024, Campbell was succeeded by Vice Admiral David Johnston as the Chief of the Defence Force upon retirement.

On 3 July 2024, a senate inquiry was launched to look into the awarding criteria of defence honours and awards, and more specifically the Distinguished Service Cross awarded to Campbell in 2012.

== Post military career ==
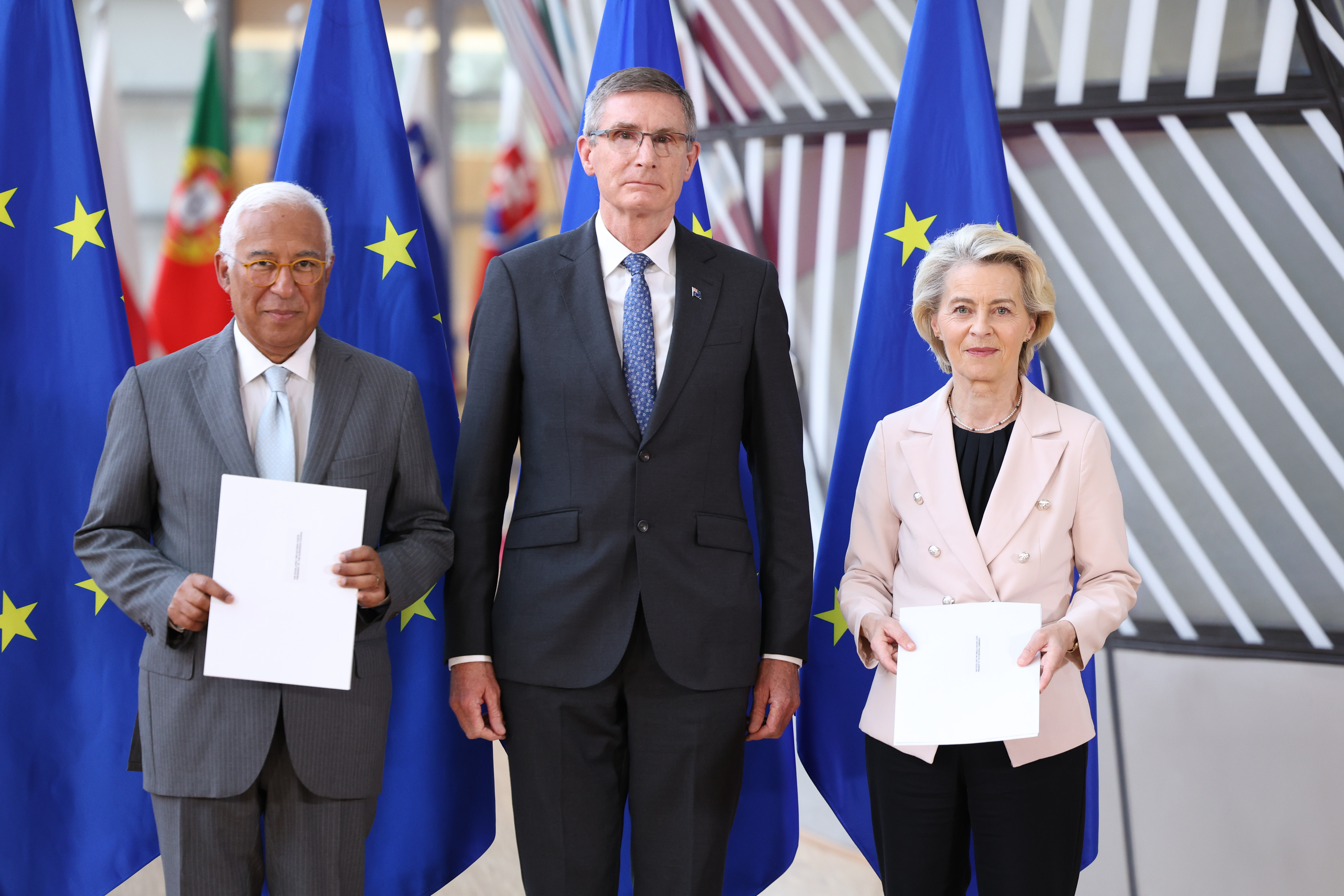
Angus Campbell presenting his credentials as ambassador to Ursula von der Leyen and António Costa.

On 17 January 2025, Senator Penny Wong, Minister for Foreign Affairs announced Campbell's appointment as the Ambassador of Australia to Belgium, Luxembourg, the European Union and the North Atlantic Treaty Organization.

In August 2026, The Australian reported that the Department of Foreign Affairs and Trade had ceased using the Distinguished Service Cross post-nominal “DSC” in Campbell's official diplomatic biography. The reference to his Distinguished Service Cross was subsequently removed from his official DFAT profile, although Campbell retained the decoration.

== Childhood and personal life ==
Campbell lived in Papua New Guinea as a child.

He is married to Stephanie Copus-Campbell, a former AusAID official and the current Australian Ambassador for Gender Equality. She is the lead advocate for Australia's work on gender equality across all aspects of foreign policy. They have two adult children.

== Honours and awards ==
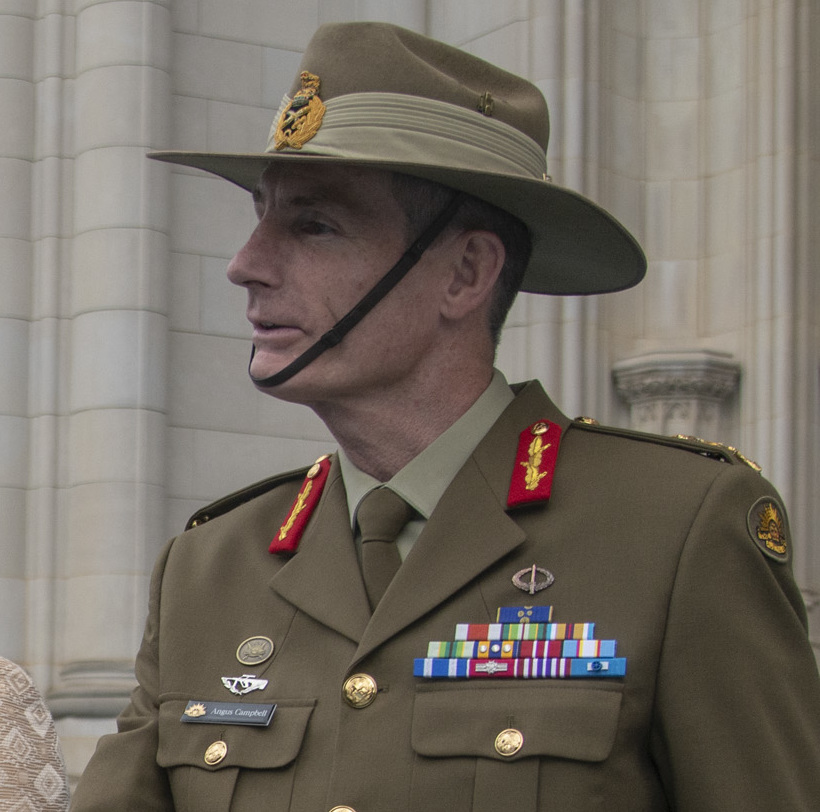
Lt Gen Campbell with medal ribbons in 2018

Officer of the Order of Australia (AO)	12 June 2017 – "For distinguished service as Head Military Strategic Commitments, Deputy Chief of Army, and Chief of Army"
Member of the Order of Australia (AM)	26 January 2003 – "For exceptional service to the Australian Defence Force as the Commanding Officer of the 2nd Battalion Group during operational service in East Timor"
Distinguished Service Cross (DSC)	11 June 2012 – "For distinguished command and leadership in action as Commander Joint Task Force 633 on Operation SLIPPER from January 2011 to December 2011"
Australian Active Service Medal	with EAST TIMOR clasp
Afghanistan Medal	
Australian Service Medal	
Defence Force Service Medal (1982–1998) with five clasps	with federation star for 40–44 years service.
Australian Defence Medal	
United Nations Medal	For participation in UNTAET
Non-Article 5 Medal	For service on Nato-led ISAF operations
Commander of the Legion of Merit (United States)	13 June 2017 – "For exceptionally meritorious conduct in the performance of outstanding services from February 2012 to June 2017"
Commander of the Legion of Honour (France)	18 January 2024
Commander of the National Order of Merit (France)	
Distinguished Service Order (Military) (Singapore)	29 April 2022 – "For significant contributions towards strengthening defence ties between the Australian Army and The Singapore Army"
Meritorious Service Medal (Military) (Singapore)	14 September 2017 – "For significant contributions towards strengthening defence ties between the Australian Army and The Singapore Army"
Courageous Commander of the Most Gallant Order of Military Service (Malaysia)	18 February 2019
Medal of Merit (East Timor)	20 August 2022
Grand Meritorious Military Order, First Class (Indonesia)	2 December 2022

Military offices
Preceded by Air Chief Marshal Mark Binskin	Chief of the Defence Force; 2018–2024	Succeeded by Admiral David Johnston
Preceded by Lieutenant General David Morrison	Chief of Army; 2015–2018	Succeeded by Lieutenant General Richard Burr
New office	Commander Operation Sovereign Borders; 2013–2015	Succeeded by Major General Andrew Bottrell
Preceded by Major General Jeff Sengelman	Deputy Chief of Army; 2012–2013	Succeeded by Major General Gus Gilmore
Diplomatic posts
Preceded by Caroline Millar	Ambassador of Australia to Belgium, Luxembourg, the European Union and NATO; 2025–present	Incumbent
