= Michael Noonan (admiral) =

Australian navy officer (born 1966)

Michael Joseph Noonan
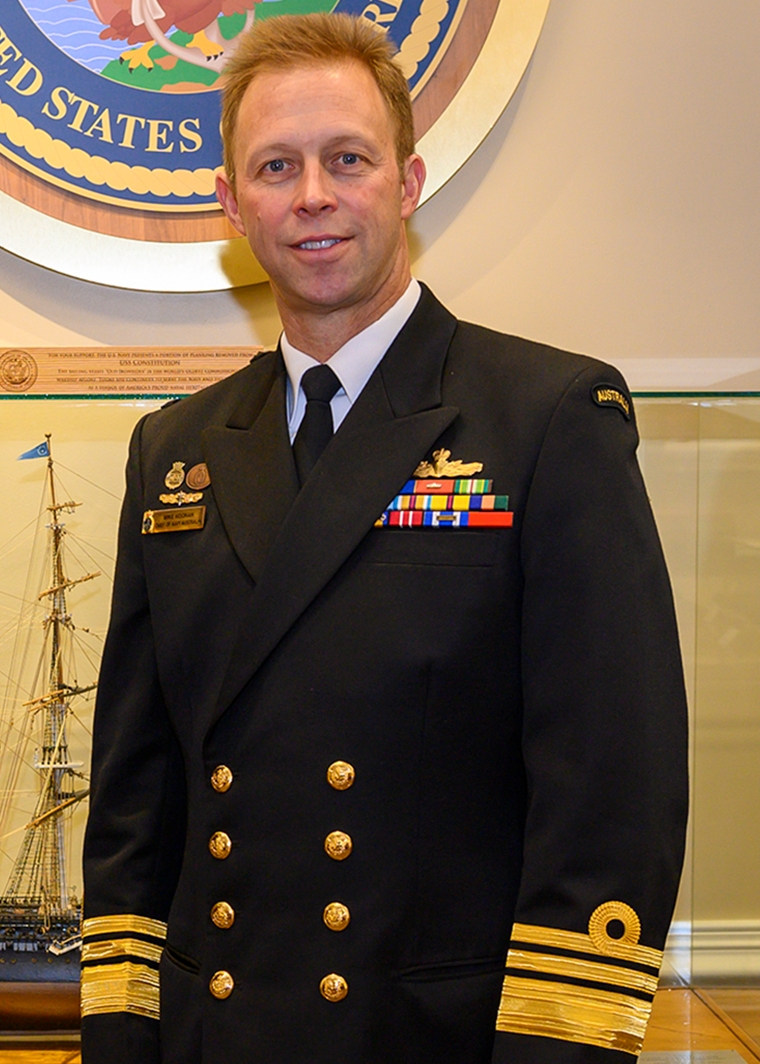
- Vice Admiral Noonan in 2020
- Born: 13 December 1966 (age 59); Melbourne, Victoria, Australia
- Military career
- Allegiance: Australia
- Branch: Royal Australian Navy
- Service years: 1984–2022
- Rank: Vice Admiral
- Commands: Chief of Navy (2018–22); Deputy Chief of Navy (2016–18); Border Protection Command (2013–16); HMAS Parramatta (2003–05)
- Conflicts: International Force for East Timor; War in Afghanistan; Iraq War; Operation Resolute
- Awards: Officer of the Order of Australia; Commendation for Distinguished Service (2); Knight of the Legion of Honour (France); Commander of the Order of Naval Merit (Chile); Grand Cross of the Order of Naval Merit (Peru); Navy Meritorious Service Star (Indonesia); Meritorious Service Medal (Singapore); Commander of the Legion of Merit (United States); Grand Cross of the Order of Naval Merit (Spain); Order of the Rising Sun, 3rd Class (Japan)

Vice Admiral Michael Joseph Noonan, AO (born 13 December 1966) is a retired senior officer of the Royal Australian Navy, who served as Chief of Navy from 6 July 2018 to 6 July 2022. He previously served as Commander Border Protection Command from 2013 to 2015 and Deputy Chief of Navy from 2016 to 2018.

== Early life ==
Noonan was born in Melbourne, Victoria, on 13 December 1966 to Michael Joseph Noonan and his wife Valerie Jean (née Maskell). He was educated at Miami and Keebra Park State High Schools on the Queensland Gold Coast. Noonan holds postgraduate qualifications in Business Administration, Maritime Policy, Marketing Communications and International Relations from the Queensland University of Technology, Universities of Wollongong and Canberra, and Salve Regina University, respectively. He is also a graduate of the Australian Institute of Company Directors.

Noonan married Jan in 17 December 1994. Jan Noonan is also a captain in the Royal Australian Navy (RAN) and was the first woman to command an Australian vessel on active service, leading HMAS Labuan on operations in East Timor in 2000. The couple have two daughters.

== Naval career ==
Noonan joined the RAN as a midshipman in 1984. He was the commissioning commanding officer of HMAS Parramatta, commanding her from 2003. He became Director of Sailor's Career Management in 2006, Chief of Staff in Headquarters Joint Task Force 633 in 2008 and Commodore Training (COMTRAIN) for the Royal Australian Navy and the Director-General of Operations at the Headquarters Joint Operations Command in 2009.

Noonan was awarded the Commendation for Distinguished Service on two occasions, and was appointed a Member of the Order of Australia in 2012.

Noonan went on to be Commander Border Protection Command in 2013 and Deputy Chief of Navy in 2016. On 16 April 2018, Prime Minister Malcolm Turnbull announced that Noonan would succeed Vice Admiral Tim Barrett as Chief of Navy. Noonan was promoted to vice admiral and appointed Chief of Navy on 6 July 2018.

Noonan was advanced to an Officer of the Order of Australia (AO) in the 2018 Queen's Birthday Honours.

On 6 January 2022 he was awarded the Meritorious Service Medal by Singapore's Minister for Defence Ng Eng Hen.

On 23 June 2022 he used his senior position to allow his civilian girlfriend to board HMAS Waller where he proposed and they spent the night together in what was dubbed the "Love sub." Waller was involved with filming for an upcoming recruitment drive for the Australian Defence Force. Five days after the incident, it was announced that he was being replaced as the Chief of Navy, he retired in September 2022.

On 5 September 2023, Noonan was appointed a Grand Cross with White Decoration of the Order of Naval Merit by Admiral Teodoro Esteban López Calderón.

On 18 October 2023, Noonan was appointed a member of the Order of the Rising Sun with golden rays (third class) by the Japanese ambassador Kazuhiro Suzuki.

Military offices
Preceded by Vice Admiral Tim Barrett	Chief of Navy; 2018–2022	Succeeded by Vice Admiral Mark Hammond
Preceded by Rear Admiral Michael van Balen	Deputy Chief of Navy; 2016–2018	Succeeded by Rear Admiral Mark Hammond
Preceded by Rear Admiral David Johnston	Commander Border Protection Command; 2013–2016	Succeeded by Rear Admiral Peter Laver
