= Combined Task Force Iraqi Maritime =

Iraqi naval task group

Combined Task Force Iraqi Maritime or CTF IM (before 2009 known as Combined Task Force 158) was an international naval task group, established as a result of Operation Iraqi Freedom. It consisted of naval assets from the United States Navy and Coast Guard, the Royal Australian Navy and the Royal Navy, working alongside elements of the Iraqi Navy and the Iraqi Marines. It reported to the Coalition Maritime Component Commander in Bahrain.

CTF IM's mission was to protect Iraqi waters and oil infrastructure and to provide international maritime security in the Northern Persian Gulf. It was also tasked to help develop the new Iraqi Navy.

With its mission complete, effective 31 December 2011, Combined Task Force Iraqi Maritime was formally disestablished.

== See also ==
- Combined Task Force 150
- 2007 Iranian seizure of Royal Navy personnel
