= Australian Naval Institute =

The Australian Naval Institute (ANI) is an independent not for profit organisation which aims to encourage and promote the advancement of knowledge, and act as a forum for, the exchange of ideas concerning subjects related to the navy and the maritime profession. It fulfills a similar function to the United States Naval Institute and the Naval Review in the United Kingdom. While there is a strong affiliation with the Royal Australian Navy and the institute has the Chief of Navy as its patron, there is no formal linkage to the navy itself. The institute's funding is provided through individual and institutional subscriptions and sponsorship.

The ANI was founded in 1975 by a group of serving Australian Naval Officers who were interested in forming a naval society. It has a current individual membership of around 300, made up of serving and retired members of the Royal Australian Navy, members of other navies, academics and members of the general public. A number of libraries and academic institutions have institutional membership. The ANI is headquartered in Canberra and governed by a council and the current president is Vice Admiral Peter Jones.

The Institute provides a weekly e-newsletter to subscribers and publishes a journal titled 'Australian Naval Review' biannually which has a focus on both historical and contemporary naval matters. The ANI hosts a number of activities annually including the Vernon Parker oration, named after the first president of the Institute.
