= HMAS Watson =

Royal Australian Navy base on Sydney Harbour

- Part of Fleet Base East
- South Head / Watsons Bay, New South Wales in Australia
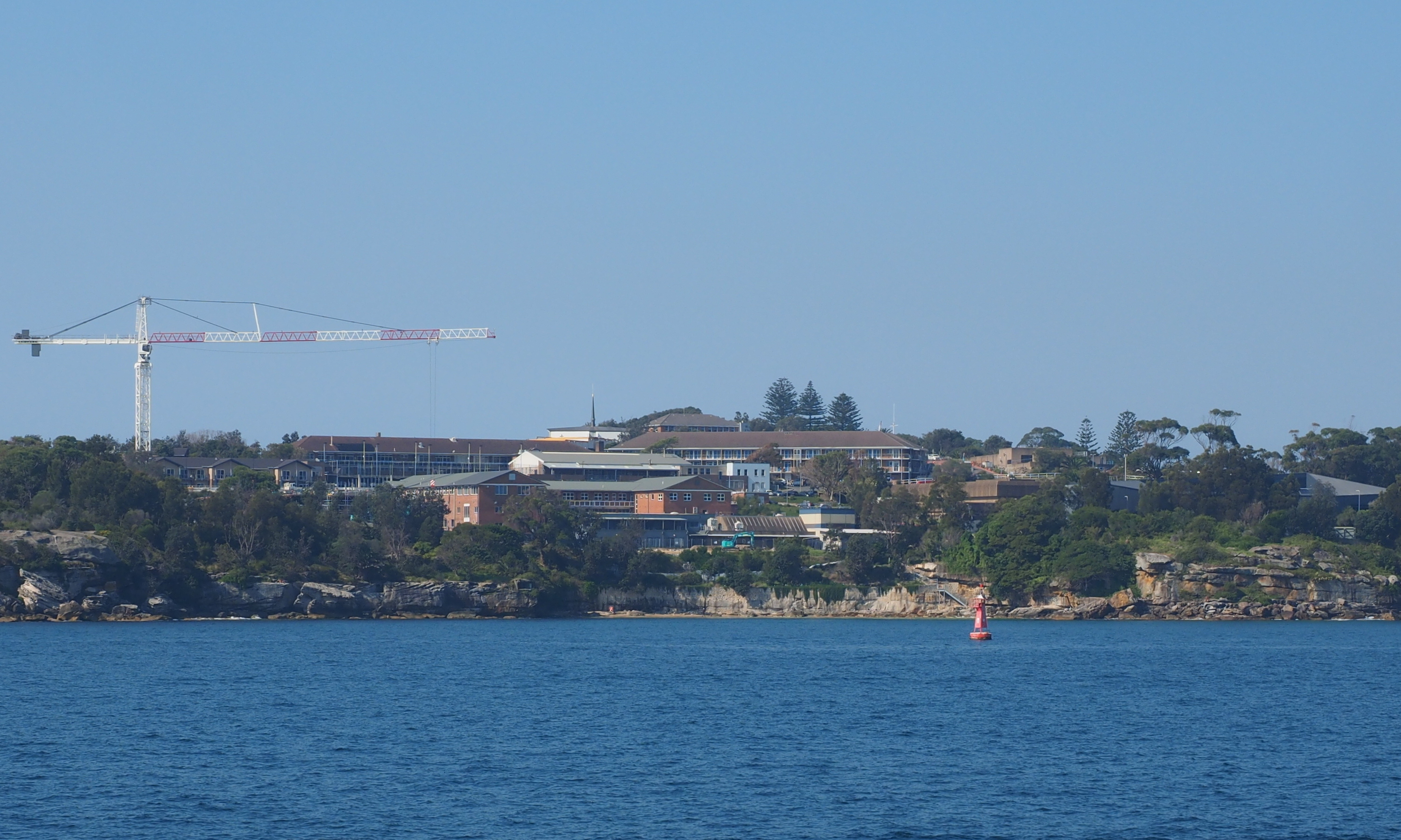
- HMAS Watson from Sydney Harbour in 2021

Site information
- Type: Naval training base
- Owner: Department of Defence
- Operator: Royal Australian Navy (1942 – 1967); Royal Australian Navy(1967 – present)

Location
- Shown within Sydney HMAS Watson (Australia)
- Coordinates: 33°50′13″S 151°16′48″E

Site history
- Built: 1942
- In use: 1942 – present

Garrison information
- Current commander: Captain RAN

HMAS Watson is a Royal Australian Navy (RAN) base on Sydney Harbour at South Head, near Watsons Bay in Sydney, Australia. Commissioned in 1945 (after three years operating as HMAS Radar), the base served as the RAN's radar training school. In 1956, torpedo and anti-submarine warfare training were relocated to the base, and by 2011, Watson was the main maritime warfare training base, as well as providing post-entry education for maritime warfare officers, training for combat system and electronic warfare sailors, and command training.

== History ==
The base's name is derived from its location at Watsons Bay, which in turn was named after Robert Watson, the quartermaster of HMS Sirius, a ship of the First Fleet. In 1801, Governor Philip King granted Watson land at South Head, where he settled. Watson later becoming boatswain, senior harbour pilot and harbourmaster of the new colony. In 1818, Governor Lachlan Macquarie commissioned the Macquarie Lighthouse appointing Watson as the first superintendent of the lighthouse. Today, the Macquarie Lighthouse is depicted in the centre of the crest of HMS Watson.

South Head was recognised as an important site for the young colony and, as early as the first year of settlement, a signal gun from HMS Sirius was installed at South Head in order to indicate the arrival of any ships.

The first permanent military presence on South Head commenced in 1871 with the development of Coastal artillery emplacements to defend the Port of Sydney. The first barracks, occupied by members of the NSW Artillery, were completed 19 March 1877. Extensions were added in 1880 to accommodate additional personnel. Many of the early barracks constructions are still standing.

The RAN first established training facilities at South Head in 1942, when the navy's radar school was shifted there from HMAS Rushcutter. The facility initially operated under the name HMAS Radar, but was commissioned as HMAS Watson on 14 March 1945. Torpedo and anti-submarine warfare training were relocated to Watson in 1956.

== Facilities and operational units ==
Watson's main role is for the training of RAN personnel in maritime warfare. In addition, the base provides post-entry training for maritime warfare officers in areas of navigation, ship handling, tactics, weapons, and sensors; training for combat system operator and electronic warfare category sailors; and command training for recently promoted commanding and executive officers. It is also the parent base for RAN personnel studying at Sydney universities.

The facility has a ship's company of 300.

== See also ==
- List of Royal Australian Navy bases
