= Conspicuous Service Cross (Australia) =

Australian Defence Force Award

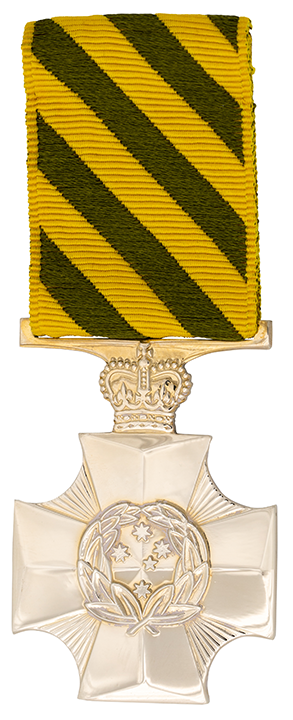
- Medal and ribbon
- Type: Medal
- Awarded for: outstanding commitment to duty or outstanding application of exceptional skills, judgment or dedication, in non-war-like situations
- Presented by: Australia
- Eligibility: Members of the Australian Defence Force and Officers & Instructors of the Australian Defence Force Cadets
- Post-nominals: CSC
- Status: Currently awarded
- Established: 18 October 1989
- Final award: 2025 Birthday Honours

Highlights
- Total: 1,517
- Ribbon for CSC & Bar

Order of Wear
- Next (higher): Member of the Royal Victorian Order
- Next (lower): Nursing Service Cross
- Related: Conspicuous Service Medal

The Conspicuous Service Cross (CSC) is a decoration (medal) of the Australian honours system. It is awarded to members of the Australian Defence Force "for outstanding devotion to duty or outstanding achievement in the application of exceptional skills, judgment or dedication, in non-warlike situations". In November 2019, 1129 people were listed as recipients. All ranks are eligible for the award.

== History ==
The Conspicuous Service Cross was introduced in 1989 to acknowledge outstanding achievement and performance of duty in non-warlike circumstances. Previously, there had been no option for such recognition other than using awards within the Order of Australia.

== Description ==
- The medal is a nickel-silver modified Maltese Cross with each axis measuring 38 millimetres, ensigned with the Crown of Saint Edward in nickel-silver, with the arms of the cross interspersed with fluted rays. The obverse bears a central device of the Southern Cross surrounded by a laurel wreath.
- The back of the cross shows a horizontal panel.
- The ribbon is 32 millimetres wide, having alternating diagonal stripes of bush green and sandy gold 6 millimetres wide.
- Additional awards of the CSC wear a nickel-silver bar with a superimposed replica of the cross. The bar is attached to the ribbon of the original award.

== Multiple award recipients ==
Several people have received the Conspicuous Service Cross for a second time (C.S.M. and Bar), including:

	Awardee	Original award	Bar awarded
Colonel	Jeffrey Quirk	2000 Queen's Birthday Honours	2010 Queen's Birthday Honours
Vice Admiral	Stuart Mayer	2008 Australia Day Honours	2011 Australia Day Honours
Colonel	Mark Brewer	2006 Queen's Birthday Honours	2011 Australia Day Honours
Lieutenant Colonel	Rolf Audrins	2007 Queen's Birthday Honours	2013 Australia Day Honours
Group Captain	Chris Hanna	27 November 2003	2013 Australia Day Honours
Captain	Jan Noonan	2003 Queen's Birthday Honours	2014 Australia Day Honours
Captain	Phillip Andrew Henry	2017 Queen's Birthday Honours	2021 Australia Day Honours
Commander	Phillipa Hay	2014 Queen's Birthday Honours	2021 Australia Day Honours

== See also ==
- Australian Honours Order of Wearing
- Post-nominal letters (Australia)
- Category:Recipients of the Conspicuous Service Cross (Australia)
