= Commendation for Distinguished Service =

Australian military decoration

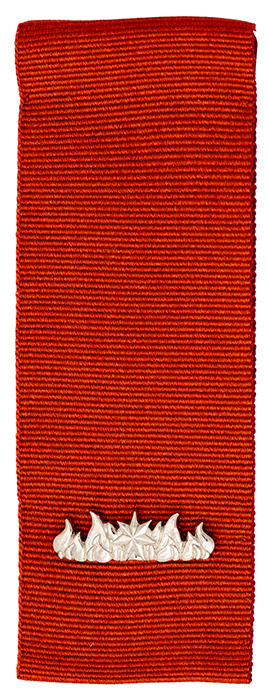
- Insignia and ribbon
- Type: Medal
- Awarded for: "the distinguished performance of duties in warlike operations to members of the Australian Defence Force"
- Presented by: Governor-General of Australia
- Eligibility: Members of the Australian Defence Force
- Status: Currently awarded
- Established: 15 January 1991
- First award: 1993
- Final award: 2025 Australia Day Honours

Highlights
- Total: 535

Order of Wear
- Next (higher): Commendation for Brave Conduct
- Next (lower): War medals, campaign medals, active service medals and service medals
- Related: Distinguished Service Cross; Distinguished Service Medal

The Commendation for Distinguished Service is a military decoration awarded to personnel of the Australian Defence Force, it is awarded for the distinguished performance of duties in warlike operations. Awards are made by the governor-general of Australia on the advice of the minister for Defence. The Commendation for Distinguished Service was introduced in 1991 and replaced its Imperial equivalent, Mention in Despatches. It is the third level of distinguished service decoration in the Australian Honours System.

== Description ==
- The insignia of the Commendation for Distinguished Service is a central Federation Star on a nickel-silver row of flames that taper at each end.
- The insignia is attached to an ochre-red ribbon.

== See also ==
- Australian Honours Order of Precedence
- Category:Recipients of the Commendation for Distinguished Service
