= Principal warfare officer =

Warfare specialist officers

A principal warfare officer (PWO), is one of a number of warfare branch specialist officers.

== Australia ==
In Australia, a PWO is a Royal Australian Navy officer who has completed PWO training. The Australian PWO course is delivered at HMAS Watson. Such officers are awarded the Principal Warfare Officer badge.

== United Kingdom ==
In the UK, a PWO is a naval officer who has completed PWO course either by attending the UK course at the Maritime Warfare School at HMS COLLINGWOOD or by attending a suitable international equivalent.

=== Training ===
Introduced in 1972, the RN PWO Course has set the world standard for Warfare Officer training. The course usually marks a watershed in a Warfare officer’s career and successful completion is a prerequisite for FF/DD Command. PWO students are usually Warfare branch senior Lieutenants or junior Lieutenant Commanders drawn from all specialisations; Surface Warfare Officers comprise the bulk of students but Fleet Air Arm, Mine Warfare Officer, Mine Clearance Diving Officer, Hydrographic & Meteorologist, Royal Fleet Auxiliary, Submariner and foreign officers are allocated places provided that they reach certain criteria

Originally based at the School of Maritime Operations then based at HMS DRYAD, the RN's PWO course was formally a joint course with the Royal Australian Navy until the RAN established their own organic course. The course moved to the Maritime Warfare School at HMS COLLINGWOOD in 2004. The current iteration of PWO Course (known as PWO17) was a significant redesign of the course and put more influence on being a Defence Watch PWO in a conflict scenario. Originally PWOs had been trained to specialise in one sphere of warfare (AAW, ASuW, ASW) and received little training on the other spheres. More recently the Defence Watch PWO concept developed where all PWOs are trained in all spheres of warfare and will then sub-specialise later in their careers as their interests and aptitude develop. Prior to PWO17, there was an impression in some quarters that RN PWOs were being trained for peace time operations, with an over emphasis on exercise safety. The PWO17 concept was designed to address this.

PWO course is currently (working) 45 weeks long and split into three phases, Maritime General Phase (shared with specialised Submariner and Aviator courses), Maritime Tactical Phase (split into different environments - ASW, ASuW, Gunnery, AAW) and Maritime Execute Phase.

==== Maritime General Phase ====
5 weeks. The initial common phase is attended by all Surface, Submariner, and Aviator PWO courses, as well as those completing the Maritime Planning Officer Course, and provides a baseline level of advanced warfare knowledge through lectures, table top tactics, and the unique amalgamation of understanding brought by the different branches. On completion of this phase all but the core PWO students depart for further joint and specialist training.

==== Maritime Tactical Phase ====
24 weeks. The purpose of the Tactical Phase is to build upon the Warfare knowledge established in the General Phase and apply it to tactical situations in the Air, Surface and Sub-Surface Warfare spheres. The Maritime Composite Training System simulators are used throughout the phase to provide realistic practical application of these skills.

==== Maritime Execute Phase ====
19 weeks. The final phase where all the skills developed in the previous phases are brought together in multi-threat simulations. The phase starts with a set of initial simulator assessments, develops with assessments at sea in an FF/DD and culminates in final assessments in the MCTS simulators. The assessment weeks are interspersed with development of wider skillsets, including simulator training, lectures, visits, discussions and table top tactics. Students ability to plan at an operational and tactical level for a task group operation is also assessed during this phase.

=== Employment ===
PWOs are assigned to Frigates, Destroyers, Aircraft Carriers, amphibious assault ships as well as various battle staffs and headquarters. They derive their authority from the delegation of the Commanding Officer's personal responsibility for the operational conduct of the ship and for units under their command.

PWOs assigned to Royal Navy ships have a myriad of duties, summarised below;

1. The PWO is to perform the duties of the Officer in Charge (OiC) of the Operations Room.
2. The PWO is the Commanding Officer’s watchkeeping adviser on: tactics, the general operational situation. and on airspace co-ordination unless relieved of this function by an AWO. (See Para 1901 4 sub para a).
3. The PWO is to advise the Commanding Officer on the correct employment of personnel, weapons, sensors and communications to meet any future and or current operational requirements for own or subordinate units and to comply with the orders given by a Superior Commander and or Commanding Officer.
4. The PWO is to conduct appropriate planning to ensure that personnel, weapons sensors, communications and CBRNDC measures are at the level of readiness to meet any future and or current operational requirements for own or subordinate units and to comply with orders given by a Superior Command and/or Commanding Officer.
5. The PWO is to direct the correct employment of personnel, sensors, weapons and communications resources to meet future and/or current operational/tactical requirements for own and subordinate units and to comply with the orders given by a Superior Commander and/ or Commanding Officer.
6. The PWO is to ensure that any failure of or defect in equipment that may impair the efficient operational conduct of the Ship is reported without delay to any Superior Commander, the Commanding Officer, the Officer of the Watch (OOW) and the specialist officers concerned.
7. The PWO is to ensure that the accuracy, currency and provenance of all information, including reference information, presented within the Action Information Organisation, is fully understood and used appropriately within any decision making or estimate process.
8. The PWO is to provide advice to the Command on Joint Operational Information Management policy and processes.
9. The PWO, in the absence of specialist personnel, is to provide the Command with advice on those areas of warfare that may not fall within the individual’s skill sets. This may include:
  1. LLM OC
  2. Operations Other Than War
  3. Maritime Security operations
  4. MCM
  5. Intelligence and ISR
  6. Geospatial Intelligence and Information
  7. CBRN
  8. ROE and legal aspects of maritime operations
  9. Joint Information Warfare
  10. Cyber Warfare

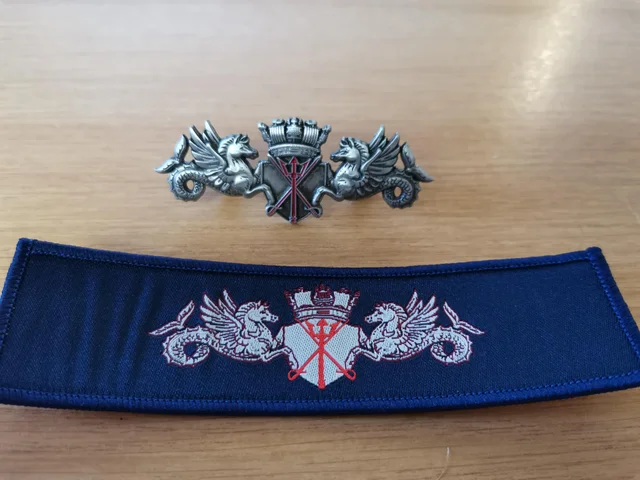
Pin and badge awarded to graduates of the Royal Navy's Principal Warfare Officer's course.

In 2020, the Royal Navy determined PWO's deserved some formal recognition of the amount of training they received and the special position they inhabit within a fighting unit, the PWO pin and badge was subsequently commissioned and authorised for wear.

The pin was designed in consultation with the Naval Historical Branch (Ships’ Names and Badges Committee) and consists of a pair of heraldic sea horses (Hippocampi), representing the Surface Fleet, supporting a shield (which is emblematic of Defence), bearing a trident for sea power and crossed with naval swords for warfare, all assigned by the Naval Crown.
