= John Caligari =

Australian general (born 1960)

John Graham Caligari
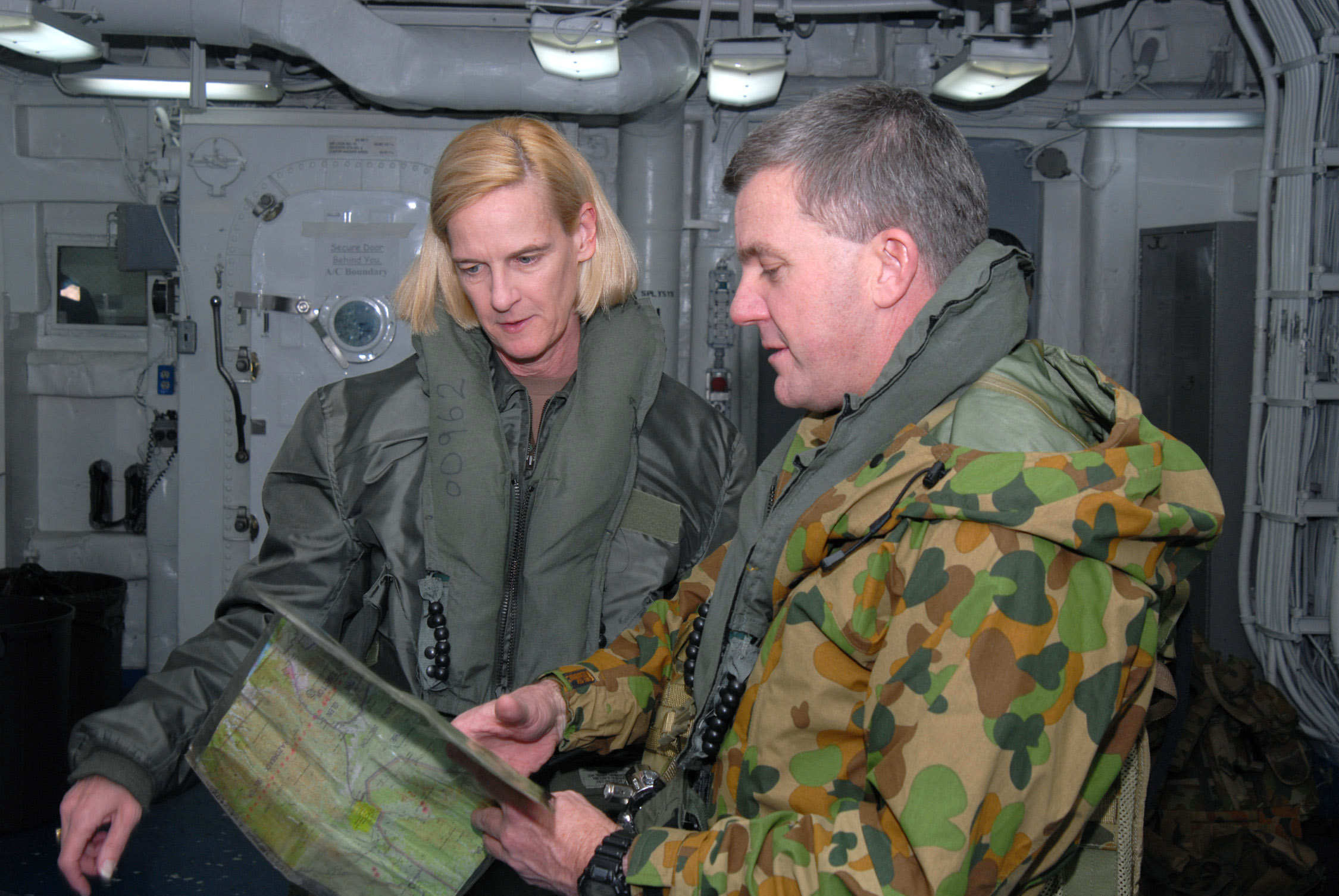
- Brigadier Caligari with US Rear Admiral Pottenger during Talisman Saber 2007
- Born: 21 August 1960 (age 66); Brisbane, Queensland
- Military career
- Allegiance: Australia
- Branch: Australian Army
- Service years: 1979–2015
- Rank: Lieutenant General
- Commands: Chief Capability Development Group (2014–15); 3rd Brigade (2006–09); 1st Battalion, Royal Australian Regiment (1999–01)
- Conflicts: Operation Paladin; Operation Solace; East Timor; War in Afghanistan
- Awards: Officer of the Order of Australia; Distinguished Service Cross

Lieutenant General John Graham Caligari (born 21 August 1960) is a retired senior officer of the Australian Army. He served as Chief Capability Development Group from October 2014 until his retirement in August 2015.

== Early life ==
Caligari was born in Brisbane, Queensland, on 21 August 1960 to Barry John Caligari, an Army officer, and his wife Christine Graham (née Wilkie). He was educated at Marist College Canberra and the International School of Kuala Lumpur, and entered the Royal Military College, Duntroon in 1979 where he undertook training to become an officer in the Australian Army.

== Military career ==
Upon graduating from Duntroon in 1982, Caligari was assigned to the Royal Australian Infantry Corps and was posted to the 1st Battalion, Royal Australian Regiment (1 RAR), an infantry unit that his father, Barry Caligari, was commanding at the time.

In 1989, Caligari was in the Middle East as a United Nations observer on the Lebanese/Israeli border with UNTSO, and subsequently at UNTSO Headquarters in Jerusalem (Operation Paladin). He took his wife, Narelle, a nurse, and his twin sons, then aged nine months, with him to Israel. From late 1990, he was a rifle company commander in the 1st Battalion. In 1993 he was an operations officer of the 1st Battalion Group deployed to Somalia as part of Operation Solace, for which he was awarded a Chief of the Defence Force Commendation. In June 2000, he deployed as Commander of the 1st Battalion Ready Group on HMAS Manoora for the evacuation of Australians from the Solomon Islands (Operation Plumbob).

He was deployed to East Timor after it achieved independence in 1999. "The highlight of his career" was commanding the 1st Battalion Group on operations along the Timor Leste-Indonesian border with the United Nations Transitional Administration in East Timor (UNTAET), as part of Operation Tanager. For his command and leadership on this operation he was awarded the Distinguished Service Cross.

Caligari oversaw numerous reforms while Chief of Staff, Headquarters Training Command – Army (TC-A) in 2005–06, under Major General Richard Wilson.

In 2007–08 Caligari commanded the Townsville-based 3rd Brigade, as a brigadier. In January 2009 he was appointed Deputy Commander, Joint Task Force 633 – Afghanistan, as part of Operation Slipper, a position he filled for six months.

He was promoted to major general in mid-2009, and appointed Head Modernisation and Strategic Plans – Army (HMSP-A). In 2012 Caligari was appointed Head Capability Systems (HCS), heading up one of Capability Development Group's two divisions. For his "distinguished service" in both of these roles, Caligari was appointed an Officer of the Order of Australia in the 2014 Queen's Birthday Honours.

Promoted to lieutenant general in October 2014, Caligari was appointed Chief Capability Development Group (CCDG) in succession to Vice Admiral Peter Jones. In this role he was responsible for the Department of Defence's Capability Development Group; the branch tasked to develop and gain government approval for future defence capabilities. After ten months in this role, Caligari retired in August 2015 as part of a Defence restructure that necessitated cuts to senior management. His position of CCDG was identified as redundant at 'three-star' rank level, and has been scaled down.

== Personal life ==
His father, Barry, retired as Commanding Officer of the 1st Battalion in 1983. Caligari and his father hold the distinction of being the only father-son duo in the Australian Army to have commanded the same battalion. Caligari's father was his son's commanding officer for two months when he graduated from Duntroon in 1982.

Caligari married Narelle, a nurse, on 3 January 1987 and they have three children; twin sons and a daughter.

== Educational and professional qualifications ==
- 1982 – Bachelor of Arts, University of New South Wales, Royal Military College, Duntroon
- 1998 – Master of Defence Studies, University of New South Wales, Australian Defence Force Academy
- 1999 – Chief of Army's Visiting Fellow at the Strategic and Defence Studies Centre, Australian National University
- 2004 – Master of Arts (Strategic Studies), Deakin University
- Graduate, US Army Command and General Staff College, Fort Leavenworth
- Graduate, CDSS (Centre for Defence and Strategic Studies, Australian Defence College, Canberra)
- Graduate, Joint/Combined Land Component Commanders Course, US Army War College, Carlisle
- Graduate, Australian Institute of Company Directors, having served as Chairman of the Army Credit Union and a member of the Board of Frontline Defence Services
- 2006 – Completed the Harvard Australia Leadership Program

== Honours and awards ==

Officer of the Order of Australia (AO)	9 June 2014 "For distinguished service as Head Modernisation and Strategic Planning-Army and Head Systems Capability Development Group."
Member of the Order of Australia (AM)	26 January 2007 "For exceptional performance of duties in command and senior Army staff appointments."
Distinguished Service Cross (DSC)	26 January 2002, CO 1 RAR Battalion Group on Operation TANAGER, East Timor, 2000–2001.
Australian Active Service Medal	
Afghanistan Medal	
Australian Service Medal	
Defence Force Service Medal with four clasps	
Australian Defence Medal	
United Nations medal for Truce Supervision Organization	(United Nations)
United Nations medal for Transitional Administration in East Timor	(United Nations)
NATO Medal for ISAF	(Northern Atlantic Treaty Organisation)

Commendations

- Chief of Defence Force Commendation – December 1993 – Operations Officer, 1 RAR on Operation SOLACE, Somalia 1993

Military offices
Preceded by Vice Admiral Peter Jones	Chief Capability Development Group; 2014–2015	Succeeded by Air Vice Marshal Mel Hupfeld (Acting)
