= Robert Chipman =

Australian air force officer

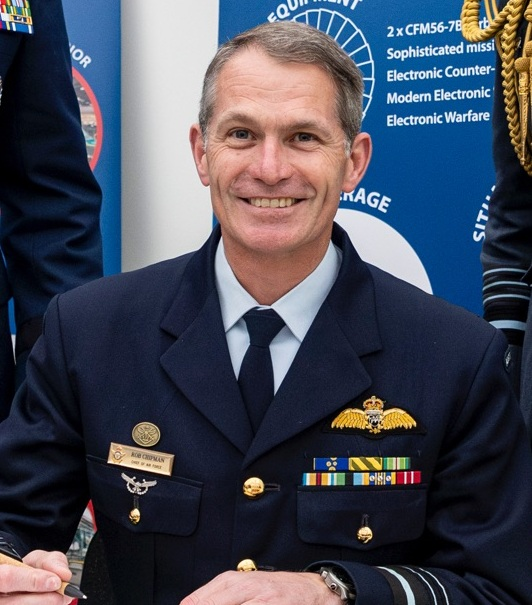
- Air Marshal Chipman in 2023
- Born: 1971 (age 54–55)
- Military career
- Allegiance: Australia
- Branch: Royal Australian Air Force
- Service years: 1989–present
- Rank: Air Marshal
- Commands: Vice Chief of the Defence Force (2024–); Chief of Air Force (2022–24); Head Military Strategic Commitments (2021–22); Air Task Unit 630.1 (2014); No. 81 Wing RAAF (2013–14); Air and Space Operations Centre (2010–12); No. 75 Squadron RAAF (2006–09)
- Conflicts: War in Afghanistan; War against the Islamic State
- Awards: Officer of the Order of Australia; Conspicuous Service Cross; Knight Grand Commander of the Order of Military Service (Malaysia); Air Force Meritorious Service Star, First Class (Indonesia); Meritorious Service Medal (Singapore)

Air Marshal Robert Timothy Chipman, AO, CSC (born 1971) is a senior officer in the Royal Australian Air Force (RAAF). He joined the RAAF as an aeronautical engineer in 1989 and gained his pilot's wings in 1994. He has commanded No. 75 Squadron RAAF (2006–09), the Air and Space Operations Centre (2010–12), No. 81 Wing RAAF (2013–14) and Air Task Unit 630.1 (2014), and deployed to the Middle East on Operations Slipper and Okra. He served as the Australian military representative to NATO and the European Union from 2019 to 2021, head of military strategic commitments from 2021 to 2022 and chief of Air Force from 2022 to 2024. Chipman assumed his current appointment as the vice chief of the Defence Force on 9 July 2024.

== RAAF career ==
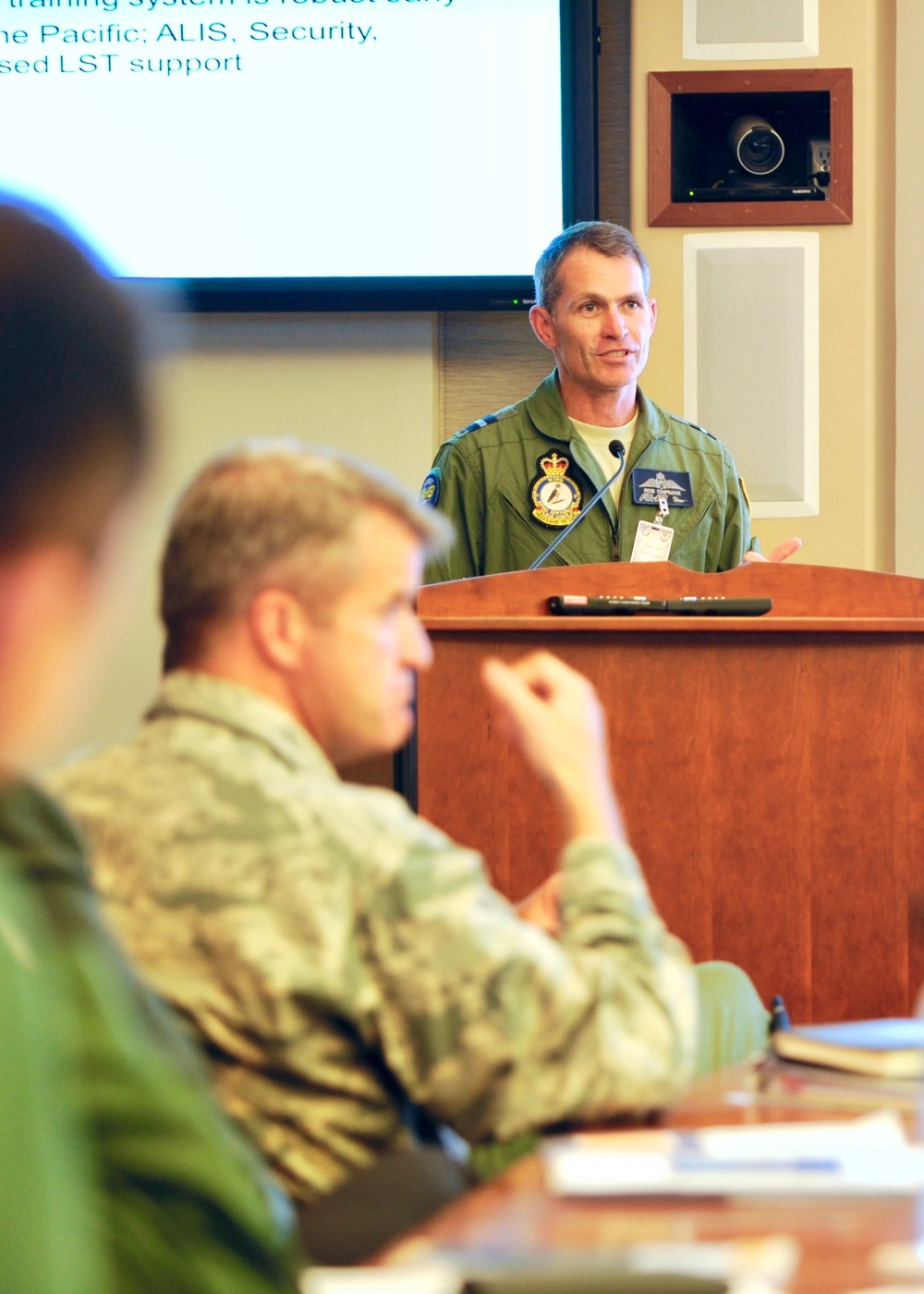
Air Commodore Chipman gives a briefing at the Pacific F-35 Symposium in Hawaii, 2017

Chipman joined the Royal Australian Air Force (RAAF) as an officer cadet in 1989. He graduated from the University of Sydney with a Bachelor of Aeronautical Engineering with Honours in 1992 and gained his pilot's wings in 1994. His early career included postings to Nos. 25 and 76 Squadrons, flying the Macchi MB-326H, and later Nos. 77 and 75 Squadrons after converting to the McDonnell Douglas F/A-18 Hornet. On qualifying as a fighter combat instructor in 1999, he was posted to No. 2 Operational Conversion Unit as an instructor on the F/A-18 Hornet and then as a fighter combat instructor and flight commander in No. 75 Squadron.

Chipman was appointed executive officer of No. 2 Operational Conversion Unit in 2002, Deputy Director Firepower in the Capability Development Group in 2004, and commanding officer of No. 75 Squadron in 2006. During Chipman's command, No. 75 Squadron was awarded the Gloucester Cup as the most proficient flying squadron in the RAAF in 2008 and the Kittyhawk Trophy as the most proficient fighter squadron in 2009. On promotion to group captain in 2010, Chipman was made Director of the Air and Space Operations Centre in Headquarters Joint Operations Command. In 2012, he deployed to Qatar in support of Operation Slipper, serving as a battle director in the United States 609th Air and Space Operations Center. Following his return to Australia, he was appointed commanding officer of No. 81 Wing at RAAF Base Williamtown.

Chipman redeployed to the Middle East in September 2014, this time as commander of Air Task Unit 630.1 on Operation Okra. He returned to Australia in 2015 as the inaugural Director of Plan Jericho. Plan Jericho was a "transformation program intended to deliver joint, integrated air and space capability" for the Australian Defence Force (ADF). The following year, in recognition of his "outstanding achievement" in the Middle East, Chipman was awarded a Conspicuous Service Cross in the 2016 Australia Day Honours. He completed the Defence and Strategic Studies Course later that year, graduating with a Master of Business Administration.

Chipman subsequently served as Director General Capability Planning – Air Force and, on promotion to air vice-marshal, was posted to Belgium in 2019 as Australian Military Representative to NATO and the European Union. In the Queen's Birthday Honours that year, he was appointed a Member of the Order of Australia for his "exceptional service ... in coalition air operations, air combat capability preparedness, and strategic capability development and sustainment." Chipman returned to Australia in 2021 as Head Military Strategic Commitments, with responsibility for the strategic management and situational awareness of ADF commitments.

In June 2022, the Deputy Prime Minister and Minister for Defence, Richard Marles, announced that Chipman would be appointed as the next Chief of Air Force. Chipman succeeded Air Marshal Mel Hupfeld in the role on 1 July. Chipman was appointed an Officer of the Order of Australia in the 2024 Australia Day Honours for "distinguished service in responsible positions as Australia’s Military Representative to the North Atlantic Treaty Organisation; and as Head of Military Strategic Commitments Branch". In April, Marles announced that Chipman would be appointed Vice Chief of the Defence Force from July 2024. Chipman was awarded Malaysia's Knight Grand Cross of the Order of Military Service in May, Indonesia's Air Force Meritorious Service Star, First Class in June and, on 3 July, was succeeded by Air Marshal Stephen Chappell as Chief of Air Force.

In October 2024, Chipman was presented with the Singaporean Meritorious Service Medal (Military) by Singapore's Minister for Defence, Ng Eng Hen.

== Personal life ==
Chipman is married to Alyce and has four children. He enjoys reading, running, and playing AFL. His father, Doug Chipman, is a retired RAAF air commodore and the former mayor of the City of Clarence in Tasmania.

Military offices
Preceded by Vice Admiral David Johnston	Vice Chief of the Defence Force; 2024–present	Incumbent
Preceded by Air Marshal Mel Hupfeld	Chief of Air Force; 2022–2024	Succeeded by Air Marshal Stephen Chappell
Preceded by Major General Roger Noble	Head Military Strategic Commitments; 2021–2022	Succeeded by Air Vice-Marshal Stephen Chappell
