= Roger Noble =

Major General in the Australian Army

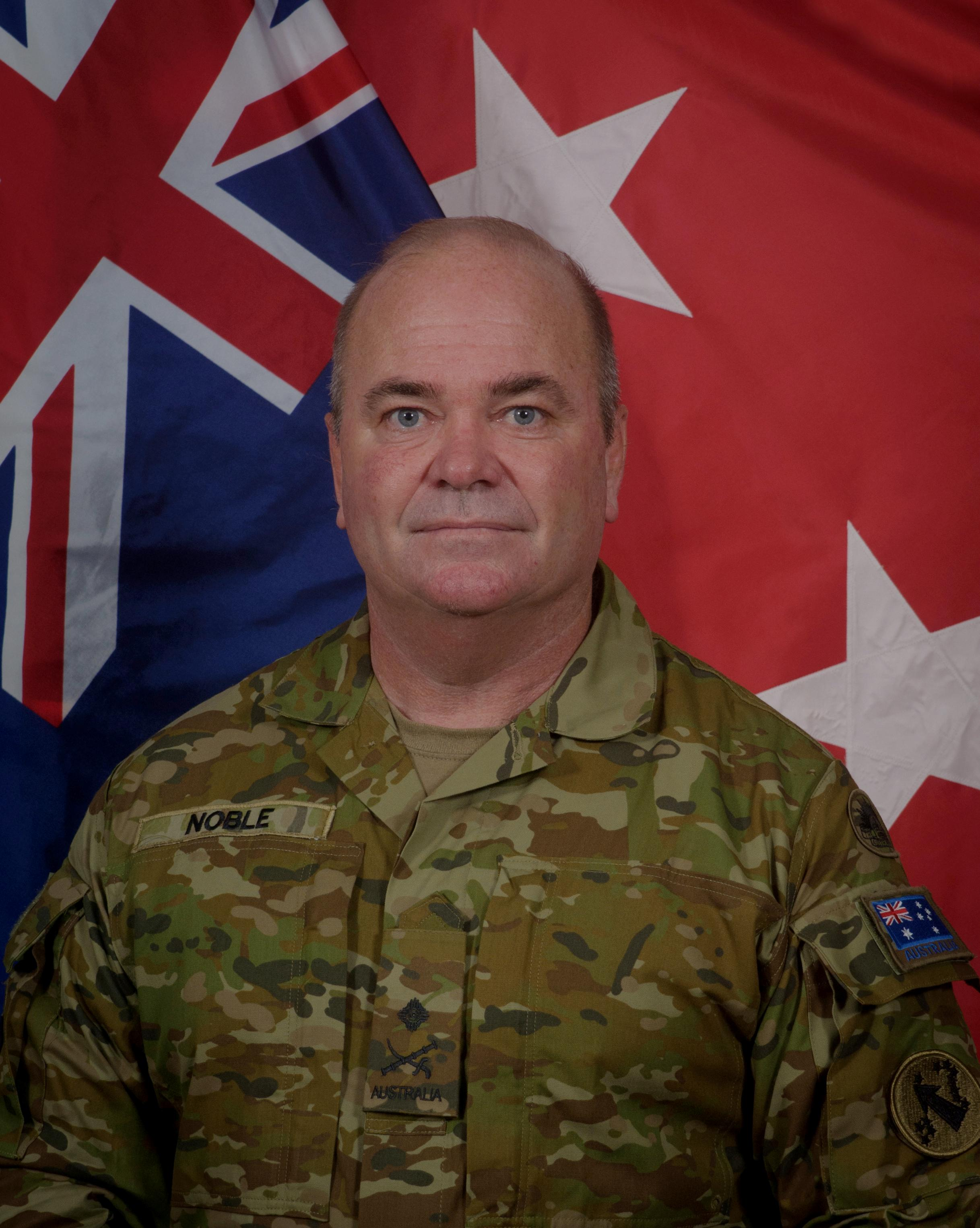
- Roger Noble in 2017

Australian Ambassador for Counter-Terrorism
- In office 18 February 2021 – 9 February 2023
- Preceded by: Paul Foley
- Succeeded by: Richard Feakes

Personal details
- Born: 16 March 1966 (age 60) Cairns, Queensland
- Spouse: Daniella Brodsky
- Education: University of New South Wales (BA [Hons]); Johns Hopkins University (MIPP); Deakin University (MBA); University of Canberra (MDefStud)

Military service
- Allegiance: Australia
- Branch/service: Australian Army
- Years of service: 1984–2021
- Rank: Major General
- Commands: Head Military Strategic Commitments (2019–21); Deputy Chief of Joint Operations (2019); Deputy Commanding General – North (2017–19); 3rd Brigade (2013–15); Al Muthanna Task Group (2005); 2nd Cavalry Regiment (c. 2004–05)
- Battles/wars: East Timor (UNTAET); War in Afghanistan; Iraq War; War against the Islamic State
- Awards: Officer of the Order of Australia; Distinguished Service Cross; Conspicuous Service Cross; Commendation for Distinguished Service; Officer of the Legion of Merit (United States); Defence Cooperation Medal (Japan)

Major General Roger John Noble, AO, DSC, CSC (born 16 March 1966) is a retired senior Australian Army officer and diplomat. He joined the army via the Australian Defence Force Academy in 1984 and was commissioned into the Royal Australian Armoured Corps. He commanded the 2nd Cavalry Regiment (c. 2004–05), Al Muthanna Task Group (2005) and the 3rd Brigade (2013–15), and deployed six times on operations to East Timor, Afghanistan and Iraq. He was seconded to the United States Army in 2016 and served as Deputy Coalition Land Force Commander, Iraq, as part of Operation Inherent Resolve, and subsequently as Deputy Commanding General – North in the United States Army Pacific (2017–19). He retired from the Australian Army in 2021 and served as Australian Ambassador for Counter-Terrorism from February 2021 to February 2023, before joining Laing O'Rourke as General Manager – Defence and, subsequently, Infrastructure Advisory Group (IAG) as Managing Director – Defence and National Security in 2025.

== Early and personal life ==
Noble was born in Cairns, Queensland, and educated at The Pittwater House School in Sydney. He is married to New York-born author and journalist Daniella Brodsky, with whom he has two daughters.

== Military career ==
=== Early career ===
Noble entered the Australian Defence Force Academy as an Australian Army officer cadet in 1984. He was part of the academy's first graduating class in 1986; he graduated with a Bachelor of Arts with Honours in history and was awarded the Commander-in-Chief's Medal. He subsequently completed an additional twelve months of training at the Royal Military College, Duntroon, before he was commissioned a lieutenant in the Royal Australian Armoured Corps. His early career was marked by appointments in cavalry, armoured personnel carrier and tank units, which included troop and squadron command appointments within the 2nd Cavalry Regiment. In between regimental postings, Noble served as aide-de-camp to the Chief of Army, deployed to Iraq in 1992 as a Chemical Destruction Group Team Leader with the United Nations Special Commission, and was posted as Staff Officer Grade 2 Land Operations in Army Headquarters.

In 2001, Noble was deployed to East Timor for service with the United Nations Transitional Administration, being appointed the Operations Officer for Sector West. He received a Commendation for Distinguished Service for his performance in this role. Soon after his return to Australia in 2002, Noble was re-deployed to serve as joint operations officer in support of initial Australian operations during the War in Afghanistan. On leaving the Middle East, he was posted as Defence Advisor to the Australian government's Joint Standing Committee for Foreign Affairs, Defence and Trade and thereafter to Army Headquarters as Staff Officer Grade 1 Concepts. Noble was awarded a Conspicuous Service Cross in the 2004 Queen's Birthday Honours in recognition of his "outstanding achievement" in this and earlier staff postings.

=== Senior command and staff appointments ===
Noble was subsequently appointed commanding officer of the 2nd Cavalry Regiment and, in April 2005, deployed with the headquarters and two squadrons of his unit to command the first Al Muthanna Task Group, a cavalry battlegroup tasked with operations in southern Iraq. Noble returned to Australia in November, and was awarded the Distinguished Service Cross in the 2006 Queen's Birthday Honours in recognition of his "distinguished command and leadership" during the deployment. Promoted colonel in 2007, he was posted to the Australian Command and Staff College as Director of Studies – Land. The following year, he was awarded a John Monash Scholarship to read for a Master of International Public Policy at the Paul H. Nitze School of Advanced International Studies, Johns Hopkins University. Noble was the first member of the Australian Defence Force to receive a John Monash Scholarship. He graduated in 2009, having conducted research into strategy in conflict management. Noble also holds a Master of Business Administration from Deakin University and a Master of Defence Studies from the University of Canberra.

Following promotion to brigadier in 2010, Noble was appointed Director Special Operations Capability at Special Operations Command and, in December 2011, was re-deployed to Afghanistan to serve as Deputy Operations and Plans Officer with the International Security Assistance Force. He returned to Australia in December 2012 and was appointed Director General Land Development in the Capability Development Group. In November 2013, Noble was posted to North Queensland as commander 3rd Brigade. He relinquished command of the brigade in November 2015 and was appointed a Member of the Order of Australia in the 2016 Queen's Birthday Honours.

Noble was seconded to the United States Army in 2016 and deployed with the 101st Airborne Division as Deputy Coalition Land Force Commander, Iraq, as part of Operation Inherent Resolve. In this post, Noble was subordinate to Major General Gary J. Volesky and effectively second-in-command of Coalition forces supporting the Iraqi Army in the war against the Islamic State. In an interview with ABC News, Noble expressed confidence that the war against the Islamic State was being won but, remarking on the conduct of warfare in Iraq, conceded that "it's complicated" and that there was "a lot of conventional direct ground combat with high casualties and high risk". He was promoted major general in November 2016 and, the following March, succeeded fellow Australian, Major General Greg Bilton, as Deputy Commanding General – North of the United States Army Pacific in Hawaii. After almost two years, Noble relinquished the command to Major General Daniel McDaniel in January 2019. He was subsequently appointed Deputy Chief of Joint Operations in Headquarters Joint Operations Command. Noble swapped positions with Rear Admiral Jaimie Hatcher in September 2019, becoming Head Military Strategic Commitments within the Vice Chief of Defence Force Group. In this role Noble was responsible for the strategic management of potential and present commitments for the Australian Defence Force.

== Ambassador for Counter-Terrorism and corporate roles ==
Noble was advanced to Officer of the Order of Australia in the 2021 Australia Day Honours in recognition of his "exceptional strategic leadership, planning and coordination" in a number of senior roles. Shortly after, on 18 February, the Minister for Foreign Affairs, Marise Payne, announced Noble's appointment as Australia's next Ambassador for Counter-Terrorism. In this role, he led "Australia's international engagement on counter-terrorism" and represented Australia at international forums on counter-terrorism issues. Noble stepped down from the role in February 2023, and later that month joined Laing O'Rourke as General Manager – Defence. He became Managing Director – Defence and National Security at Infrastructure Advisory Group (IAG) in March 2025.

== Notes ==
Diplomatic posts
Preceded by Paul Foley	Australian Ambassador for Counter-Terrorism; 2021–2023	Succeeded by Richard Feakes
Military offices
Preceded by Rear Admiral Jaimie Hatcher	Head Military Strategic Commitments; 2019–2021	Succeeded by Air Vice Marshal Robert Chipman
Preceded by Major General Greg Bilton	Deputy Chief of Joint Operations; 2019	Succeeded by Rear Admiral Jaimie Hatcher
Preceded by Major General Greg Bilton	Deputy Commanding General – North; United States Army Pacific; 2017–2019	Succeeded by Major General Daniel McDaniel
