= David Hurley =

Governor-General of Australia from 2019 to 2024

General The Honourable David Hurley AC, CVO, DSC, FTSE
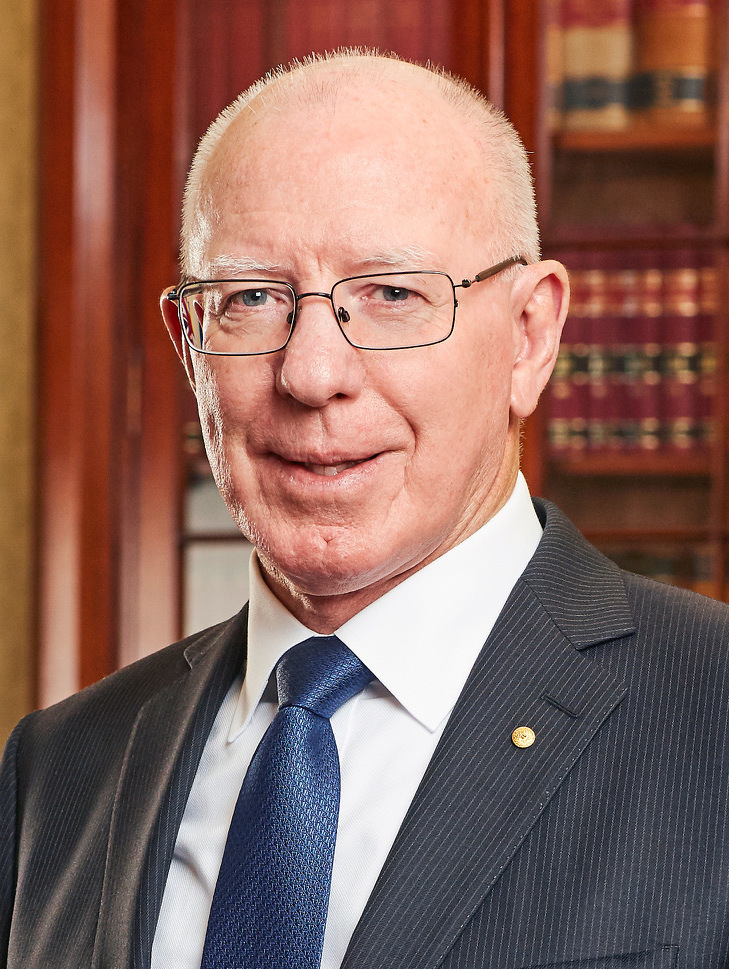
- Official portrait, 2019

27th Governor-General of Australia
- In office 1 July 2019 – 1 July 2024
- Monarchs: Elizabeth II; Charles III
- Prime Minister: Scott Morrison; Anthony Albanese
- Preceded by: Sir Peter Cosgrove
- Succeeded by: Sam Mostyn

38th Governor of New South Wales
- In office 2 October 2014 – 1 May 2019
- Monarch: Elizabeth II
- Premier: Mike Baird; Gladys Berejiklian
- Lieutenant: Tom Bathurst
- Preceded by: Dame Marie Bashir
- Succeeded by: Margaret Beazley

Personal details
- Born: David John Hurley; 26 August 1953 (age 73) Wollongong, New South Wales, Australia
- Spouse: Linda McMartin (m. 1977)
- Children: 3

Military service
- Allegiance: Australia
- Branch/service: Australian Army
- Years of service: 1972–2014
- Rank: General
- Commands: Chief of the Defence Force (2011–2014); Vice Chief of the Defence Force (2008–2011); Chief of Joint Operations (2007–2008); Chief of Capability Development Group (2003–2007); Land Commander Australia (2002–2003); 1st Brigade (1999–2000); 1st Battalion, Royal Australian Regiment (1991–1993)
- Battles/wars: Operation Solace
- Awards: Companion of the Order of Australia; Distinguished Service Cross; Knight of the Order of Saint John

General David John Hurley (born 26 August 1953) is an Australian viceregal officeholder and military officer. A senior officer in the Australian Army, he served as the 27th governor-general of Australia from 2019 to 2024. He was previously the 38th governor of New South Wales from 2014 to 2019.

In a 42-year military career, Hurley deployed on Operation Solace in Somalia in 1993, commanded the 1st Brigade (1999–2000), was the inaugural Chief of Capability Development Group (2003–2007) and Chief of Joint Operations (2007–2008) and served as Vice Chief of the Defence Force (2008–2011). His career culminated with his appointment as Chief of the Defence Force on 4 July 2011, in succession to Air Chief Marshal Angus Houston.

Hurley retired from the army in June 2014 and succeeded Marie Bashir as governor of New South Wales in October 2014 on the nomination of Premier Mike Baird. His term concluded in May 2019 and he was subsequently appointed by Queen Elizabeth II as governor-general on the nomination of Prime Minister Scott Morrison. His five-year term commenced in July 2019 and expired in July 2024, with Sam Mostyn succeeding him.

== Early life and education ==
David John Hurley was born on 26 August 1953 in Wollongong, New South Wales, to Norma and James Hurley. His father was an Illawarra steelworker and his mother worked in a grocery store. Hurley grew up in Port Kembla and attended Port Kembla High School, where he completed his Higher School Certificate in 1971. He subsequently graduated from the Royal Military College, Duntroon with a Graduate Diploma in Defence Studies, and from Deakin University with a Bachelor of Arts.

Hurley is married to Linda (née McMartin) and has three children.

== Military career ==
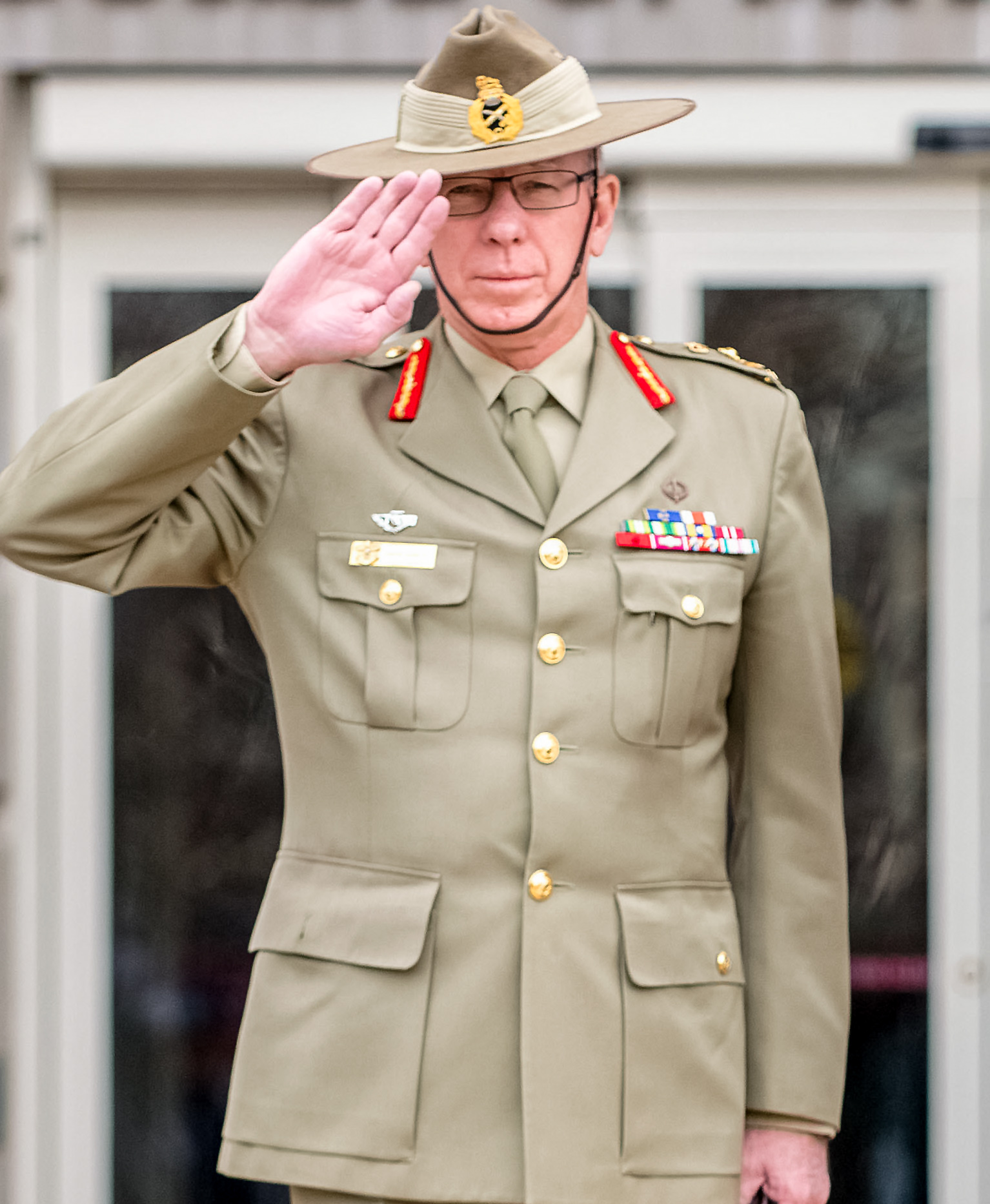
General Hurley, 2013

Hurley entered the Royal Military College, Duntroon, as an officer cadet in January 1972. On graduating from Duntroon in December 1975, he was commissioned a lieutenant in the Royal Australian Infantry Corps. His initial posting was to the 1st Battalion, Royal Australian Regiment (1RAR). Promoted to captain, he was appointed adjutant of the Sydney University Regiment before becoming regimental adjutant of the Royal Australian Regiment. He went on exchange to the 1st Battalion, Irish Guards, a British Army unit, before serving with 5th/7th Battalion, Royal Australian Regiment.

Promoted to lieutenant colonel, Hurley was posted as the Senior Career Adviser (Armour, Artillery, Engineers and Infantry) in the Office of the Military Secretary in 1990, appointed SO1 (Operations) Headquarters 2nd Division in early 1991, and in November 1991 assumed command of 1RAR, which he led during Operation Solace in Somalia in 1993. He was awarded the Distinguished Service Cross for his service during this deployment. In 1994 he became SO1 (Operations), Headquarters 1st Division.

Following promotion to colonel, Hurley was appointed Chief of Staff, Headquarters 1st Division in June 1994, attended the United States Army War College from 1996 to 1997, became Military Secretary to Chief of Army, and was posted to Australian Defence Headquarters as Director of Preparedness and Mobilisation in December 1997. As a brigadier, he assumed command of the 1st Brigade in Darwin in January 1999. During this period he oversaw the brigade's transition to a higher degree of operational readiness and its support to Australian–led operations in East Timor. He went on to be Director General Land Development within Capability Systems in January 2001.

Hurley was promoted to major general in 2001 and served as Head Capability Systems Division from July 2001, and as Land Commander Australia from December 2002. Promoted to lieutenant general, he assumed the new appointment of Chief of Capability Development Group in December 2003, went on to take the newly separated appointment of Chief of Joint Operations in September 2007, and became Vice Chief of the Defence Force in July 2008.

Hurley was promoted to general and succeeded Air Chief Marshal Angus Houston as Chief of the Defence Force (CDF) on 4 July 2011. In January 2012 Hurley completed 40 years service to the Australian Defence Force, and on 20 January while in Paris, he was presented with the insignia for Officer of the Legion of Honour by the French CDF. In February, he was presented with a fifth clasp to the Defence Force Service Medal in recognition of his 40 years of service. Hurley retired from the Australian Army on 30 June 2014, and was succeeded as CDF by Air Chief Marshal Mark Binskin.

Lieutenant General David Morrison, the 2016 Australian of the Year, credited Hurley with the phrase "the standard you walk past is the standard you accept" in his anti-misogyny speech, which became "one of the most quoted phrases" of Morrison's speech.

== Governor of New South Wales ==
On 5 June 2014, New South Wales Premier Mike Baird announced that Hurley would replace Dame Marie Bashir as Governor of New South Wales: he was sworn in on 2 October 2014 after Bashir's term as governor had expired. On 17 March 2015, he was invested as a Knight of the Order of St John by the Lord Prior of the Order, Neil Conn, at a ceremony at Government House, Sydney.

== Governor-General of Australia ==
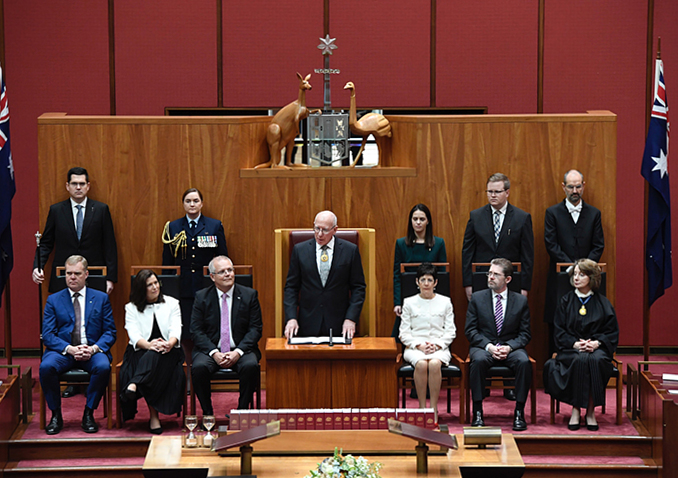
Hurley at his swearing-in ceremony as the 27th Governor-General of Australia

On 16 December 2018, Prime Minister Scott Morrison announced that Queen Elizabeth II had approved the appointment of Hurley as the next Governor-General of Australia, succeeding Sir Peter Cosgrove, commencing on 1 July 2019 marking him as the only representative of the monarch who had been born during Elizabeth's reign. Margaret Beazley was designated as his replacement as Governor of New South Wales. Hurley was sworn in as the 27th Governor-General at Parliament House, Canberra, on 1 July 2019. His first words were spoken in the language of the local Aboriginal people, the Ngunnawal language.

On 11 September 2019, when attending an Indonesian national day reception held by the Indonesian Embassy at the Australian National Gallery in Canberra, Hurley opted to make his address to the reception in Indonesian.

On 18 March 2020, a human biosecurity emergency was declared in Australia owing to the risks to human health posed by the COVID-19 pandemic in Australia, after the National Security Committee met the previous day. The Biosecurity Act 2015 specifies that the Governor-General may declare such an emergency exists if the Health Minister (at the time Greg Hunt) is satisfied that "a listed human disease is posing a severe and immediate threat, or is causing harm, to human health on a nationally significant scale". The Biosecurity (Human Biosecurity Emergency) (Human Coronavirus with Pandemic Potential) Declaration 2020 was declared by Hurley under Section 475 of the Biosecurity Act 2015.

During his tenure, Hurley promoted a leadership program to Morrison. The program — Australian Future Leaders Foundation Limited — was given $18 million in funding, despite having no office, online website or staff. This funding was cancelled by the Albanese government in September 2022, with Treasurer Jim Chalmers stating that it "didn't pass muster" or represent "value for money". Chalmers stated that there would not be an investigation into Hurley's role in the program.

Hurley was involved in the Scott Morrison ministerial positions controversy when he secretly appointed Morrison to five ministerial positions between March 2020 and May 2021. Hurley was found to have no discretion to refuse Morrison's advice and an inquiry considered criticism of Hurley's role to be "unwarranted".

In June 2022 Hurley apologised for providing a testimonial for a builder who had renovated his private house. This testimonial was used by the builder in their advertising.

== Honours and awards ==

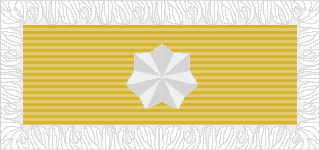

| Companion of the Order of Australia (AC) | 26 January 2010 |
| Officer of the Order of Australia (AO) | 26 January 2004 |
| Commander of the Royal Victorian Order (CVO) | 14 June 2024 |
| Distinguished Service Cross (DSC) | 26 November 1993 |
| Knight of the Order of St John | 17 March 2015 |
| Australian Active Service Medal | with Somalia clasp |
| Australian Service Medal | |
| Defence Force Service Medal with the Federation Star | 40–44 years service |
| Australian Defence Medal | |
| Officer of the Legion of Honour (France) | 20 January 2012 |
| Commander of the Legion of Merit (United States) | 10 May 2012 |
| Knight Grand Commander of the Order of Military Service (Malaysia) | 2012 |
| Defence Meritorious Service Star – 1st Class (Indonesia) | 19 November 2012 |
| Distinguished Service Order (Singapore) | 13 February 2013 |
| Knight Grand Cross of the Order of the Crown of Thailand (Thailand) | 5 April 2013 |
| Gold Decoration of Merit (Netherlands) | June 2014 |
| Grand Collar of the Order of Timor-Leste (Timor-Leste) | May 2022 |
| Meritorious Unit Citation with Federation Star | Awarded to the 1st Battalion, Royal Australian Regiment on 20 November 2023 for sustained outstanding service in warlike operations as part of the Unified Task Force on Operation SOLACE in Somalia, over the period December 1992 to May 1993. |

Badges

- Infantry Combat Badge

=== Honorary degrees ===
- (New South Wales) 2013: Honorary Doctor of Letters (D.Litt.) by the University of Wollongong.
- 2015: Honorary Doctorate of the University (D.Univ.) by the University of New South Wales.
- (New South Wales) 2017: Honorary Doctorate of the University (D.Univ.) by Macquarie University.

=== Honorary appointments ===
- (Australia) 2008–2019: Honorary Colonel of the Sydney University Regiment.
- 2014–2019: Chief Scout of Scouts Australia NSW.
  - 2019–2024: Chief Scout of Australia
- (Australia) 2014–2019: Honorary Colonel of the Royal New South Wales Regiment.
- 2014–2019: Honorary Air Commodore of No. 22 Squadron Royal Australian Air Force.
- (United Kingdom) 2014–2019: Deputy Prior of the Order of St John.
  - 2019–2024: Prior of the Order of St John
- 2014–2019: Governor of the New South Wales Police Force.
- (Australia) 2016: Honorary Fellow of the Australian Academy of Technological Sciences and Engineering (Hon.FTSE).
- 2019–2024: Patron of Rugby Australia.
- (Australia) 2019–2024: Colonel-in-Chief of the Royal Australian Army Medical Corps
- (Australia) 2019–2024: Colonel of the Regiment of the Royal Australian Regiment
- (Australia) 2025–: Chancellor of the Australian University of Theology

=== Other appointments ===
Hurley is an Honorary Patron of the ACT Veterans Rugby Club, Patron of Transport Heritage NSW, Patron of the Australian World Orchestra, and the Australian Future Leaders Foundation.

As of 2020 he is one of three patrons of the Australian Indigenous Education Foundation.

=== Coat of arms ===
The coat of arms of David Hurley

A coat of arms was created for David Hurley in his capacity as Governor of New South Wales in 2019.

Military offices
| Preceded by Major General Peter Abigail | Land Commander Australia; 2002–2003 | Succeeded by Major General Ken Gillespie |
| New title | Chief Capability Development Group; 2003–2007 | Succeeded by Vice Admiral Matt Tripovich |
| New title Separated from the roles of VCDF | Chief of Joint Operations; 2007–2008 | Succeeded by Lieutenant General Mark Evans |
| Preceded by Lieutenant General Ken Gillespie | Vice Chief of the Defence Force; 2008–2011 | Succeeded by Air Marshal Mark Binskin |
| Preceded by Air Chief Marshal Angus Houston | Chief of the Defence Force; 2011–2014 | Succeeded by Air Chief Marshal Mark Binskin |
Government offices
| Preceded by Dame Marie Bashir | Governor of New South Wales; 2014–2019 | Succeeded by Margaret Beazley |
| Preceded by Sir Peter Cosgrove | Governor-General of Australia; 2019–2024 | Succeeded by Sam Mostyn |
