= General Field =

General Field may refer to:

- Burton M. Field (fl. 1970s–2010s), U.S. Air Force lieutenant general
- Charles W. Field (1828–1892), Confederate States Army major general
- Chris Field (general) (fl. 1980s–2020s), Australian Army major general
- The field encompassing six major categories of the Grammy Awards
- League Park (Akron), venue for the Akron Pros/Indians of the National Football League, 1920–1926

== See also ==
- Lewis J. Fields (1909–1988), U.S. Marine Corps lieutenant general
- Attorney General Field (disambiguation)
