= Daniel McDaniel =

Australian Army officer

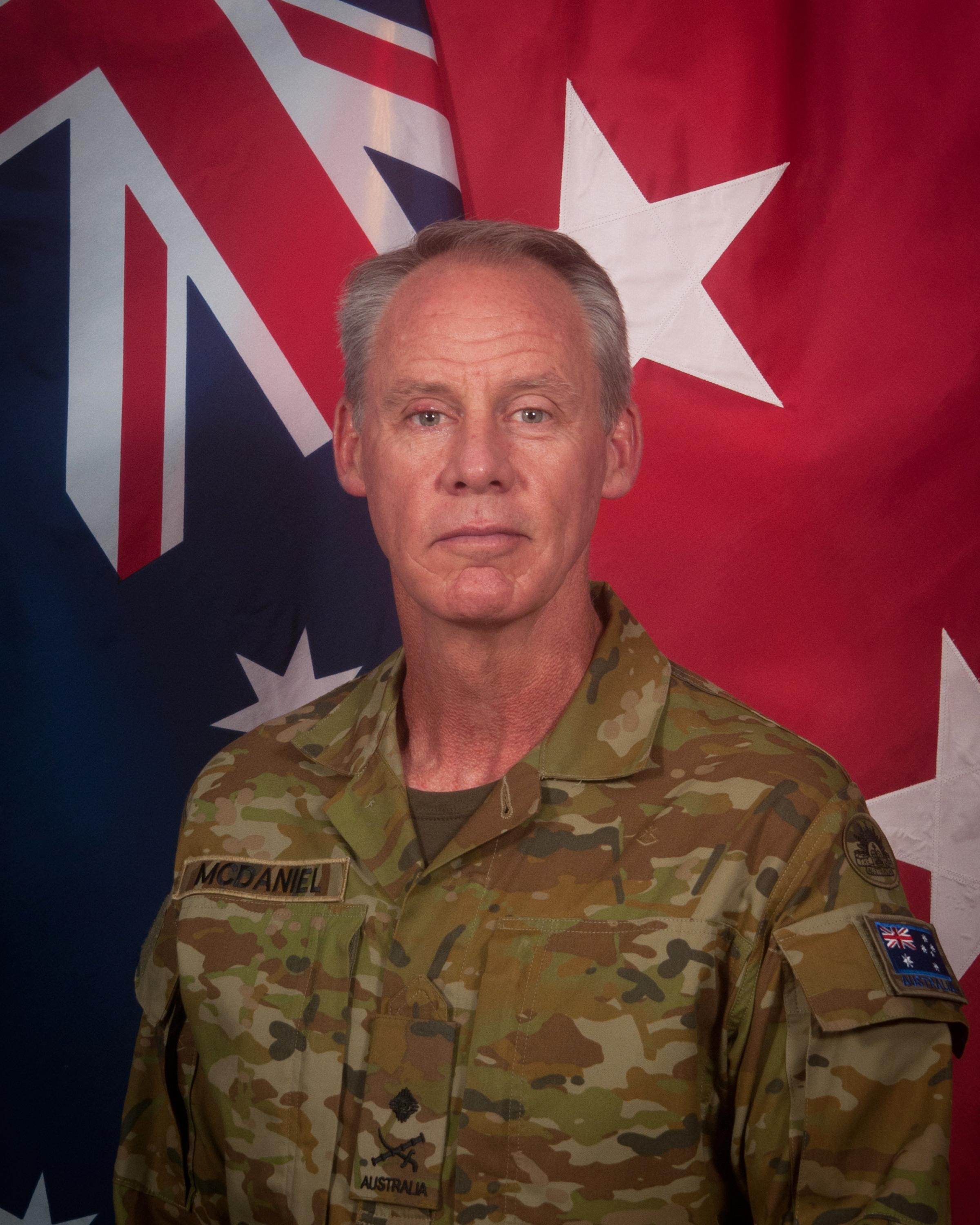
- Daniel McDaniel in 2019
- Military career
- Allegiance: Australia
- Branch: Australian Army
- Service years: 1988–2022
- Rank: Major General
- Commands: Deputy Commanding General – North (2019–22); Special Operations Command (2013–14); Special Air Service Regiment (2007–08); Special Operations Task Group IV (2007)
- Conflicts: East Timor (UNMISET); War in Afghanistan
- Awards: Distinguished Service Cross; Member of the Order of Australia; Distinguished Service Medal; Legion of Merit (United States)

Major General Daniel Francis McDaniel, DSC, AM, DSM is a retired senior officer of the Australian Army. He served as the acting Special Operations Commander Australia from September 2013 to December 2014, after Major General Gus Gilmore was reassigned. He was seconded to the United States Army Pacific as Deputy Commanding General – North from January 2019 to January 2022.

== Military career ==
McDaniel entered the Royal Military College, Duntroon, as an officer cadet in 1988. On graduating in 1989, he was commissioned a lieutenant in the Royal Australian Infantry Corps and posted to the 1st Battalion, Royal Australian Regiment. In 1993 he served on exchange with the British Army of the Rhine.

McDaniel has spent the majority of his career with special forces or assigned to special operations, having first passed selection and been posted to the Special Air Service Regiment (SASR) in 1994. He commanded the first squadron from the SASR to be deployed to Afghanistan in 2001, was Commanding Officer of Special Operations Task Group IV in Afghanistan from April to September 2007, commanded the SASR from 2007 to 2008, and was posted back to Afghanistan in 2009 as Deputy Commander International Security Assistance Force (ISAF) Special Operations Forces. McDaniel was awarded the Distinguished Service Medal in 2002 for his leadership in Afghanistan the previous year, and received the Distinguished Service Cross in 2008 in recognition of his distinguished command of Special Operations Task Group IV.

In between his operational and command postings, McDaniel has filled staff positions within Special Operations Command, Joint Operations Command and Forces Command. Following his return from Afghanistan in 2010, McDaniel was posted to Headquarters Forces Command as Colonel Plans. He was subsequently promoted brigadier and assigned as Deputy Special Operations Commander Australia. In September 2013, after Major General Gus Gilmore was reassigned, McDaniel was appointed acting Special Operations Commander Australia. He served in the position until December 2014, when Major General Jeff Sengelman was assigned the command. For his "exceptional service" with the ISAF, Forces Command and as acting Special Operations Commander Australia, McDaniel was appointed a Member of the Order of Australia in the 2015 Australia Day Honours.

McDaniel was subsequently posted as Director General of Capability Investment Analysis at Australian Defence Headquarters. On 4 January 2019, he was seconded to the United States Army Pacific to serve as Deputy Commanding General – North. He succeeded fellow Australian, Major General Roger Noble, in the role. McDaniel was awarded the United States Legion of Merit for his performance in the role, before handing over to Major General Chris Smith in January 2022.

McDaniel holds a Bachelor of Management from Southern Cross University, a Master of Management from the University of Canberra and a Master of Arts from Deakin University. He is also a graduate of the Australian Command and Staff College.

== Personal life ==
McDaniel is the son of Dale and Daniel Nolan McDaniel. Daniel senior was an officer in the Australian Army who, following service in the Vietnam War, raised the first counter-terrorist squadron of the SASR and retired as a lieutenant colonel. McDaniel is married and has one son.

Following his retirement from the Australian Army in 2022, McDaniel became a consultant. He was appointed a principal of the Nous Group management consultancy firm, based in Canberra, in November 2023.

Military offices
Preceded by Major General Roger Noble	Deputy Commanding General – North; United States Army Pacific; 2019–2022	Succeeded by Major General Chris Smith
Preceded by Major General Gus Gilmore	Special Operations Commander Australia (Acting); 2013–2014	Succeeded by Major General Jeff Sengelman
