= Justin Jones (admiral) =

Royal Australian Navy officer

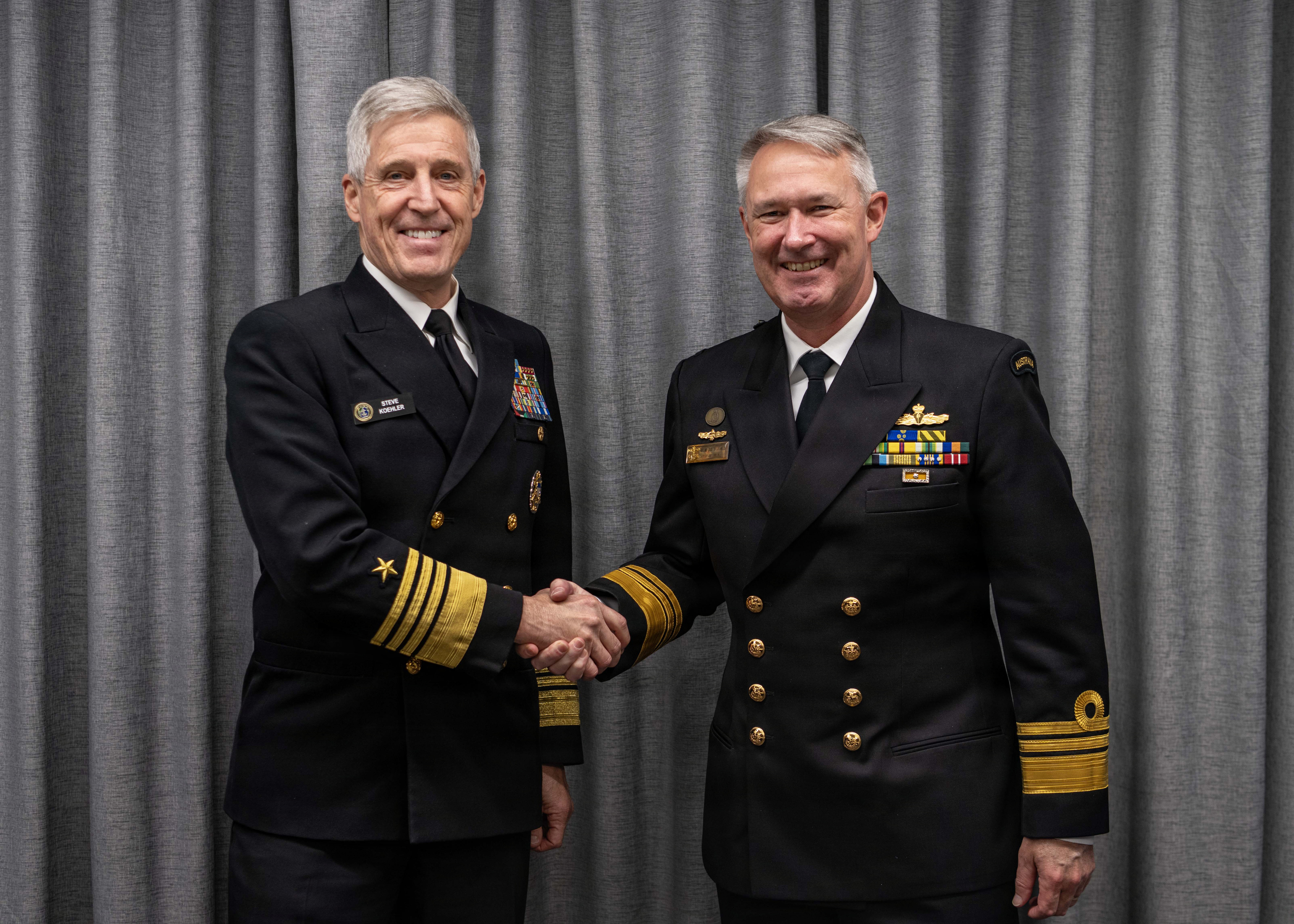
- Jones (at right) with Admiral Stephen Koehler in May 2026
- Born: Adelaide, South Australia
- Military career
- Allegiance: Australia
- Branch: Royal Australian Navy
- Service years: 1988–present
- Rank: Vice Admiral
- Commands: Chief of Joint Operations (2024–); Deputy Chief of Joint Operations (2024); Maritime Border Command (2022–24); HMAS Success (2014–16); Sea Power Centre (2011–14); HMAS Newcastle (2008–10)
- Conflicts: Iraq War
- Awards: Officer of the Order of Australia; Conspicuous Service Cross

Vice Admiral Justin Garred Jones, AO, CSC is a senior officer in the Royal Australian Navy (RAN), serving as the Chief of Joint Operations since July 2024. He joined the RAN in 1988. He has commanded HMAS Newcastle (2008–10) and HMAS Success (2014–16) and served as Director of the Sea Power Centre (2011–14). He was Commander Maritime Border Command from 2022 to 2024 and Deputy Chief of Joint Operations from January to July 2024.

== Early life ==
Jones was born in Adelaide, South Australia, and was educated at Geelong Grammar School. He joined the Royal Australian Navy (RAN) in January 1988.

== Naval career ==
Jones's seagoing command career began when he was appointed Commanding Officer of HMAS Newcastle in 2008. During his tenure aboard the guided missile frigate, he was responsible for operational readiness, regional engagement, and maritime security missions across the Indo-Pacific. Following this, he was selected as the Director of the Sea Power Centre – Australia in 2011, where he played a role in advancing naval strategic thinking and doctrine development within the RAN.

In 2014, Jones assumed command of HMAS Success, the fleet replenishment ship, an appointment that included a deployment to the Middle East under Operation Manitou. From December 2014 to April 2015, under Jones’s leadership, HMAS Success conducted maritime security operations in the Arabian Sea and Indian Ocean, intercepting narcotics and enforcing UN sanctions. For his leadership during this deployment, he was awarded the Conspicuous Service Cross in the 2016 Queen's Birthday Honours for "outstanding devotion to duty as the Commanding Officer, HMAS Success while deployed on Operation MANITOU from December 2014 to April 2015.".

Returning to Australia, Jones was promoted to Commodore Training from 2016 to 2019, overseeing the professional development, education, and operational preparedness of Navy personnel. His leadership in this role contributed to the RAN's transition toward a technologically modern and skilled maritime workforce. He subsequently served as Director General Operations at Joint Operations Command between 2019 and 2021, where he was involved in high-level operational planning and coordination across the Australian Defence Force (ADF). In 2022, Jones assumed command of Maritime Border Command, a joint agency task force within the Australian Border Force and the ADF, responsible for protecting Australia’s maritime domain from illegal activities such as people smuggling, illegal fishing, and maritime terrorism.

Jones was appointed Deputy Chief of Joint Operations in January 2024 and, that July, was promoted to vice admiral and made Chief of Joint Operations, succeeding Lieutenant General Greg Bilton and taking on responsibility for the conduct of all domestic and international ADF operations. He was appointed an Officer of the Order of Australia in the 2024 King's Birthday Honours for "distinguished service to the Royal Australian Navy in significant command positions."

== Education ==
Jones is a graduate of the Royal Australian Naval College and the Australian Command and Staff College and holds a Master of Management Studies, a Master of Arts in Strategy and Policy, and a Graduate Diploma in Defence Studies. He is currently a doctoral candidate at the Australian National Centre for Ocean Resources and Security at the University of Wollongong. His doctoral research focuses on Australian defence policy and maritime strategy in the Indian Ocean since the early 2000s.

In addition to his military and academic work, Jones has contributed to maritime security research through the Lowy Institute, where he served as a maritime advisor to the MacArthur Foundation Asia Security Project. He was also a contributing author to the 2011 Lowy Institute report, Crisis and Confidence: Major Powers and Maritime Security in Indo-Pacific Asia.

Military offices
Preceded by Lieutenant General Greg Bilton	Chief of Joint Operations; 2024–present	Incumbent
Preceded by Air Vice Marshal Michael Kitcher	Deputy Chief of Joint Operations; January–July 2024	Succeeded by Major General Hugh McAslan
Preceded by Rear Admiral Mark Hill	Commander Maritime Border Command; 2022–2024	Succeeded by Rear Admiral Brett Sonter
