= Attorney General Field =

Attorney General Field may refer to:

- Alexander Pope Field (1800–1876), Attorney General of Louisiana
- James G. Field (1826–1901), Attorney General of Virginia
- Richard Stockton Field (1803–1870), Attorney General of New Jersey

== See also ==
- General Field (disambiguation)
