= Chief of Joint Operations (Australia) =

Military three-star appointment in the Australian Defence Force

- Incumbent; Vice Admiral Justin Jones since 5 July 2024
- Member of: Australian Defence Force
- Reports to: Chief of the Defence Force
- Term length: 3–4 years
- Inaugural holder: Lieutenant General; David Hurley
- Formation: September 2007

The Chief of Joint Operations (CJOPS) is a three-star role within the Australian Defence Force (ADF), responsible for the Joint Operations Command and joint operational deployments, such as United Nations peacekeeping and joint task groups. Until 2007, the Vice Chief of the Defence Force (VCDF) was double hatted, additionally exercising the responsibilities of CJOPS. However, in September 2007 the Minister of Defence, Brendan Nelson announced the formation of a separate CJOPS position based at the Headquarters Joint Operations Command (HQJOC) at Bungendore, New South Wales.

== Joint Operations Command ==
The Joint Operations Command consists of Headquarters Joint Operations Command, Northern Command, and Australian Defence Force elements of the Maritime Border Command. Chief of Joint Operations is a joint position, and the incumbent can be appointed from any of the three ADF services.

== Chiefs of Joint Operations ==
The following list chronologically records those who have held the post of CJOPS, with rank and honours as at the completion of the individual's term.

Rank	Name	Postnominals	Image	Term began	Term ended
Lieutenant General	David Hurley	AO, DSC		September 2007	July 2008
Lieutenant General	Mark Evans	AO, DSC		July 2008	May 2011
Lieutenant General	Ash Power	AO, CSC		May 2011	20 May 2014
Vice Admiral	David Johnston	AO		20 May 2014	24 May 2018
Air Marshal	Mel Hupfeld	AO, DSC		24 May 2018	1 July 2019
Lieutenant General	Greg Bilton	AO, CSC		1 July 2019	5 July 2024
Vice Admiral	Justin Jones	AO, CSC		5 July 2024	Incumbent

== Deputy Chief of Joint Operations ==
Rank	Name	Postnominals	Term began	Term ended	Notes
Rear Admiral	Rowan Moffitt	AO	2005	2008	
Air Vice Marshal	Greg Evans	DSC, AM	2008	2009	
Major General	Ash Power	AM, CSC	2009	2010	
Rear Admiral	Ray Griggs	AM, CSC	May 2010	June 2011	
Rear Admiral	Steve Gilmore	AM, CSC	December 2011	November 2013	
Major General	Shane Caughey	AM, CSC	November 2013	November 2015	
Major General	Stuart Smith	AO, DSC	November 2015	April 2017	
Major General	Greg Bilton	AM, CSC	April 2017	December 2018	
Major General	Roger Noble	DSC, AM, CSC	2019	September 2019	
Rear Admiral	Jaimie Hatcher	DSC, AM	September 2019	August 2021	
Air Vice Marshal	Michael Kitcher	AM, DSM	August 2021	January 2024	
Rear Admiral	Justin Jones	AO, CSC	January 2024	July 2024	
Major General	Hugh McAslan	DSD	1 October 2024		The first New Zealand Army officer to hold this post.

== See also ==
- Current senior Australian Defence Organisation personnel
