= Leo Davies =

Australian RAF officer (born 1960)

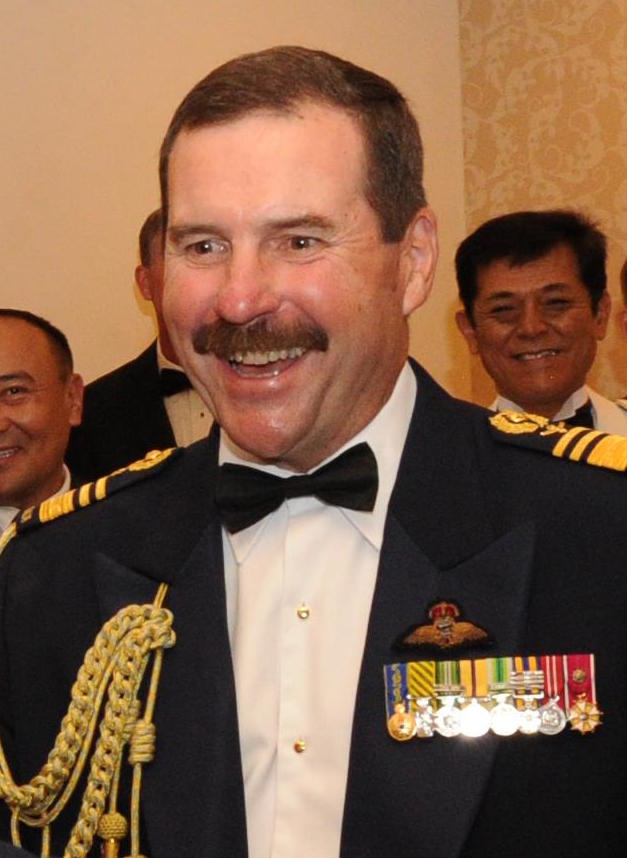
- Davies at the Pacific Air Chiefs Symposium in September 2015
- Born: 5 September 1960 (age 66); Kerang, Victoria
- Military career
- Allegiance: Australia
- Branch: Royal Australian Air Force
- Service years: 1979–2019
- Rank: Air Marshal
- Commands: Chief of Air Force (2015–19); Deputy Chief of Air Force (2012–15); No. 82 Wing RAAF (2004–05); No. 1 Squadron RAAF (2002–03)
- Conflicts: Iraq War
- Awards: Officer of the Order of Australia; Conspicuous Service Cross; Officer of the Legion of Merit (United States); Meritorious Service Medal (Singapore); Officer of the Legion of Honour (France)

Air Marshal Gavin Neil "Leo" Davies, AO, CSC (born 5 September 1960) is a retired senior officer of the Royal Australian Air Force (RAAF). A navigator who retrained as a pilot, he joined the RAAF in 1979, commanded No. 1 Squadron RAAF (2002–03) and No. 82 Wing RAAF (2004–05), deployed to Iraq in 2007, and was Australia's air attaché in Washington, D.C. (2010–11). He served as Deputy Chief of Air Force from 2012 to 2015 and succeeded Air Marshal Geoff Brown as Chief of Air Force, the professional head of the RAAF, in July 2015. He retired from the RAAF in July 2019.

== Early life ==
Gavin Neil Davies was born on 5 September 1960 in Kerang, Victoria. In 1979, he joined the Royal Australian Air Force (RAAF) as a cadet navigator.

== Military career ==
Following initial training, Davies was posted to No. 11 Squadron RAAF at RAAF Base Edinburgh in Edinburgh, South Australia, serving aboard Lockheed P-3B Orion and later P-3C Orion aircraft. He retrained as a pilot in 1987 and, after completing a conversion course on the General Dynamics F-111C, was posted to No. 1 Squadron RAAF at RAAF Base Amberley in Ipswich, Queensland, from 1988 to 1990. He was next posted on a three-year exchange with the United States Air Force, operating General Dynamics F-111D aircraft from Cannon Air Force Base in New Mexico.

Davies returned to Australia in 1993 as Operations Flight Commander for No. 1 Squadron. A posting as Operations Officer with No. 82 Wing RAAF followed, before he returned to No. 1 Squadron as executive officer from 1997 to 1998. He graduated from the RAAF Staff Course at RAAF Fairbairn in 1999 and, from 2000 to 2002, served in the Capability Systems division at Australian Defence Force Headquarters in Canberra. Davies was again posted to RAAF Base Amberley from 2002, serving as commanding officer of No. 1 Squadron. During his period in command, Davies achieved the milestone of 2000 hours flying the F-111. He served as Staff Officer to the Chief of Air Force, Air Marshal Angus Houston, in 2004, was posted as officer commanding No. 82 Wing at RAAF Base Amberley from 2004 to 2005, and was Director Combat Capability at RAAF Headquarters from 2006 to 2007. He deployed for service with the Combined Air Operations Centre later that year, working in support of operations in Iraq.

Following his return to Australia, Davies became Director General Capability Planning at RAAF Headquarters in 2008. In the Queen's Birthday Honours that June, he was awarded the Conspicuous Service Cross for his "outstanding achievement" while in command of No. 82 Wing. In 2010, he was posted as Australia's air attaché in Washington, D.C., for which he was awarded the Officer of the Legion of Merit from the United States government. On his return from the United States, Davies was promoted air vice marshal and became Deputy Chief of Air Force in January 2012.

Davies' "distinguished service" in senior command and staff positions was recognised with his appointment as an Officer of the Order of Australia in the 2014 Australia Day Honours. The citation described Davies as "the epitome of professionalism who has distinguished himself through exceptional leadership in shaping the Royal Australian Air Force of the future". The following year, he was selected as the next Chief of Air Force (CAF); the professional head of the RAAF. He was promoted air marshal and succeeded Air Marshal Geoff Brown as CAF on 4 July 2015. Davies was awarded Singapore's Meritorious Service Medal in October 2016 and, in September 2018, he was appointed an Officer of the Legion of Honour by the French government.

Davies handed over as Chief of Air Force to Air Marshal Mel Hupfeld on 3 July 2019, and retired from the RAAF after a 40-year career.

== Personal life ==
Davies is married to Rhonda. They have two children, a son and a daughter.

Military offices
| Preceded by Air Marshal Geoff Brown | Chief of Air Force; 2015–2019 | Succeeded by Air Marshal Mel Hupfeld |
| Preceded by Air Vice Marshal Neil Hart | Deputy Chief of Air Force; 2012–2015 | Succeeded by Air Vice Marshal Warren McDonald |
