= Mel Hupfeld =

Senior Royal Australian Air Force officer

Air Marshal Mel Hupfield AO DSC
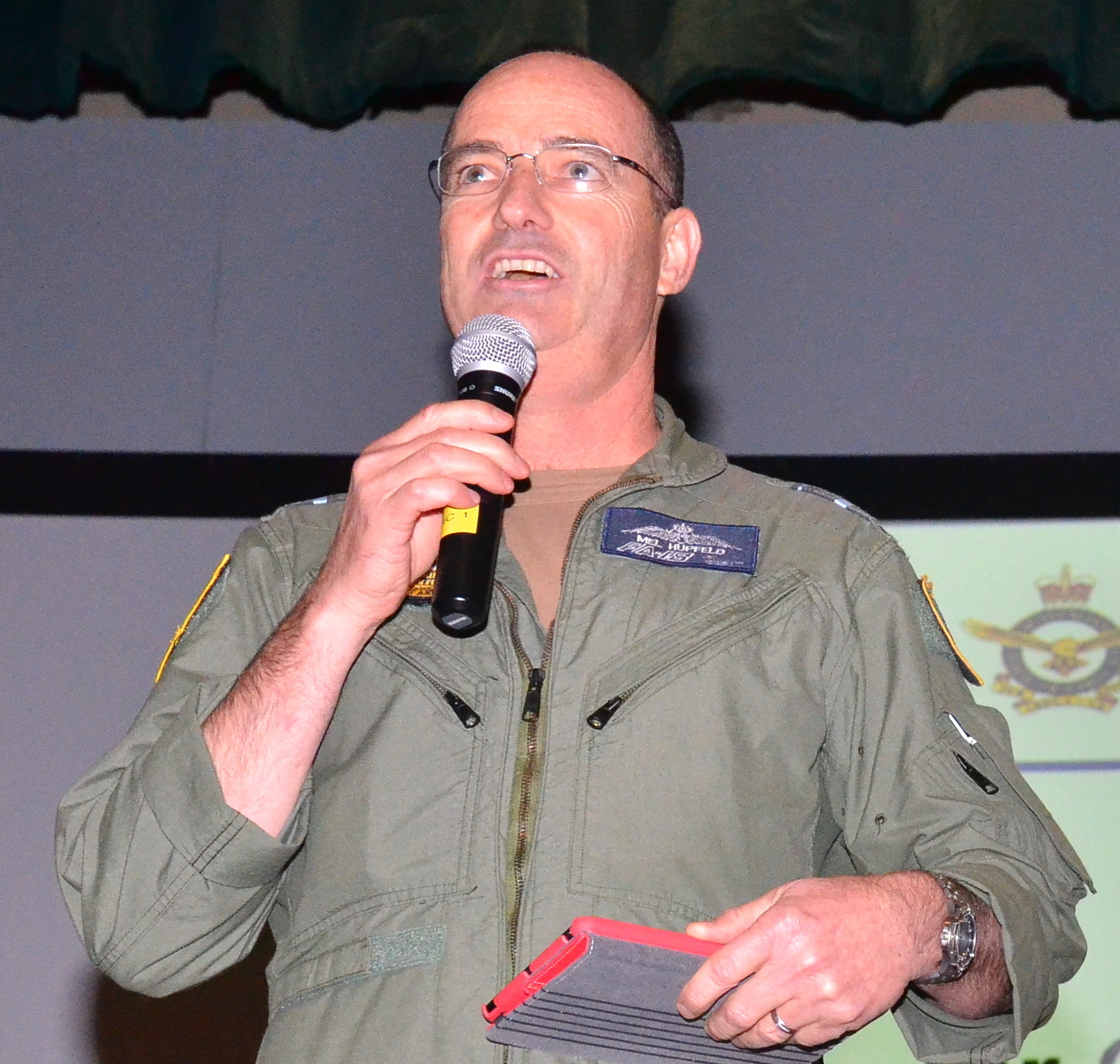
- Hupfeld in 2013
- Born: 7 March 1962 (age 64); Sydney, New South Wales
- Military career
- Allegiance: Australia
- Branch: Royal Australian Air Force
- Service years: 1980–2022
- Rank: Air Marshal
- Commands: Chief of Air Force (2019–22); Chief of Joint Operations (2018–19); Head Force Design (2016–18); Chief Capability Development Group (2015–16); Air Commander Australia (2012–14); Air Combat Group RAAF (2010–11); No. 81 Wing RAAF (2006–07); No. 75 Squadron RAAF (2001–03)
- Conflicts: Iraq War
- Awards: Officer of the Order of Australia; Distinguished Service Cross; Bronze Star (United States); Officer of the National Order of Merit (France); Meritorious Service Medal (Singapore); Gugseon Medal of the Order of National Security Merit (South Korea); Air Force Meritorious Service Star, First Class (Indonesia)
- Other work: Pipe Major of the Australian Defence Force Pipe Band (2026)

Air Marshal Melvin Ernest Glanville Hupfeld (born 7 March 1962) is a retired senior officer of the Royal Australian Air Force. He served as Air Commander Australia from 2012 to 2014 and was the acting and final Chief Capability Development Group (2015–16), before being appointed as Head Force Design in the Vice Chief of the Defence Force Group (2016–18). He was promoted air marshal and made Chief of Joint Operations in May 2018, and succeeded Air Marshal Leo Davies as Chief of Air Force in July 2019.

== Early life and education ==
Hupfeld was born in Sydney, New South Wales, on 7 March 1962, and joined the Royal Australian Air Force as an Officer Cadet in 1980. He finished his training in 1983, won the 'Flying Prize' and graduated with a Bachelor of Science degree. He completed a Master of Arts degree in Defence Studies at King's College London in 1997.

== RAAF career ==
During Hupfeld's career he has flown the Dassault Mirage III and McDonnell Douglas F/A-18 Hornet flying mainly with No. 3 Squadron RAAF. Hupfeld was awarded the Distinguished Service Cross on 27 November 2003 for his command of No. 75 Squadron RAAF during Operation Falconer, and the squadron was awarded the Meritorious Unit Citation.

Hupfeld has commanded several RAAF units during his career, including No. 75 Squadron RAAF, No. 2 Operational Conversion Unit RAAF, No. 81 Wing RAAF, and Air Combat Group RAAF. Hupfeld was promoted to air vice marshal and appointed as Air Commander Australia on 3 February 2012. He moved to the Capability Development Group, as Head Capability Systems, in September 2014, before being appointed the acting and final Chief Capability Development Group in 2015, and then Head Force Design in the Vice Chief of the Defence Force Group from 2016.

Hupfeld was promoted air marshal and appointed Chief of Joint Operations on 24 May 2018. He succeeded Air Marshal Leo Davies as Chief of Air Force on 3 July 2019.

Hupfeld was appointed an Officer of the National Order of Merit by the French government on 15 February 2021. The award recognised his contribution to bilateral Australian–French military cooperation, most notably "in the fight against Daesch in the Middle-East and in ... combined defence and security operations in the South Pacific" as Chief of Joint Operations. On 14 September 2021 he was awarded the Meritorious Service Medal by Singapore's Minister for Defence Ng Eng Hen. Hupfeld was also awarded the Air Force Meritorious Service Star, First Class by Indonesia on 23 February 2022.

In 2026, Hupfeld was selected to be the pipe major of the Australian Defence Force pipe band, performing in the Royal Edinburgh Military Tattoo.

== Personal life ==
Hupfeld is married to Louise and his interests include cycling, running, fishing, light aircraft, hang-gliding and sailing.

Military offices
Preceded by Air Marshal Leo Davies	Chief of Air Force; 2019–2022	Succeeded by Air Marshal Robert Chipman
Preceded by Vice Admiral David Johnston	Chief of Joint Operations; 2018–2019	Succeeded by Lieutenant General Greg Bilton
New office	Head Force Design; 2016–2018	Succeeded by Rear Admiral Stuart Mayer
Preceded by Lieutenant General John Caligari	Chief Capability Development Group (Acting); 2015–2016	Disbanded
Preceded by Major General John Caligari	Head Capability Systems; 2014–2015	Vacant
Preceded by Air Vice Marshal Mark Skidmore	Air Commander Australia; 2012–2014	Succeeded by Air Vice Marshal Gavin Turnbull
