= John Harvey (RAAF officer) =

Senior officer in the Royal Australian Air Force

John Paul Harvey
- Born: 4 September 1954 (age 72); Sydney, New South Wales
- Military career
- Allegiance: Australia
- Branch: Royal Australian Air Force
- Service years: 1977–2011
- Rank: Air Marshal
- Commands: Chief Capability Development Group; Program Manager, Air Combat Capability; Director Military Strategy
- Awards: Member of the Order of Australia

Air Marshal John Paul Harvey AM (born 4 September 1954) was a senior officer in the Royal Australian Air Force (RAAF) until his retirement at the end of 2011. He held the position of Chief Capability Development Group from October 2010 until December 2011.

== Military career ==
=== Early career ===
Harvey joined the RAAF as a navigator in 1977. After completing navigator training at RAAF Base East Sale he was posted to Canberra bomber aircraft at RAAF Base Amberley.

After four years flying Canberra aircraft, Harvey was appointed as the Minister for Defence's escort officer.

Harvey converted to the F-111 and completed a three-year flying tour on F-111. Following this he was appointed to the Joint Intelligence Organisation in Technical Intelligence where he served for three years. Harvey was then posted to the United States Air Force as the Flight Test Director for the F-111 Avionics Update Project.

Harvey spent a year on exchange with the New Zealand Ministry of Defence before taking up a Visiting Fellow position with the Strategic and Defence Studies Centre at the Australian National University.

After leaving the Australian National University Harvey was appointed the Defence Attaché to Southern Europe.

== Senior command ==
Harvey was promoted to air commodore and posted as Director General Aerospace Development and on 2 September 2002 he was appointed Director General Air Combat Capability.

In November 2006, Harvey was promoted to air vice marshal and appointed Program Manager New Air Combat Capability within the Defence Materiel Organisation.

In the 2008 Australia Day Honours, Harvey was appointed a Member of the Order of Australia for "exceptional service to the Australian Defence Force and Royal Australian Air Force as the Program Manager, New Air Combat Capability".

In October 2010, following the resignation of Vice Admiral Matt Tripovich, Harvey was promoted to the rank of air marshal and appointed as Chief Capability Development Group.

=== Retirement ===
At the beginning of December 2011, Harvey's position as Chief of the Capability Development Group was made answerable to a new civilian appointee. Harvey objected to the new arrangement, and subsequently tended his resignation from the RAAF; according to the Canberra Times, he "is not going to another position in Defence".

== Personal life ==
Harvey has degrees in architecture from the University of New South Wales as well as psychology and information science.

== Honours and awards ==

Member of the Order of Australia (AM)	26 January 2008
Australian Service Medal	
Defence Force Service Medal	30–34 years service
Australian Defence Medal	

Military offices
Preceded by Vice Admiral Matt Tripovich	Chief Capability Development Group; 2010–2011	Succeeded by Vice Admiral Peter Jones
