= Matt Tripovich =

Matthew John Tripovich
- Born: 4 January 1956 (age 70); Seymour, Victoria
- Military career
- Allegiance: Australia
- Branch: Royal Australian Navy
- Service years: 1974–2010
- Rank: Vice Admiral
- Commands: Chief Capability Development Group (2007–10); HMAS Anzac (1999–01); HMAS Canberra (1994–96)
- Conflicts: Gulf War; International Force East Timor
- Awards: Officer of the Order of Australia; Conspicuous Service Cross

Vice Admiral Matthew John Tripovich, AO, CSC (born 4 January 1956) is a retired senior officer of the Royal Australian Navy. He served as Chief Capability Development Group from 2007 until his retirement in October 2010.

== Early life ==
Matthew John Tripovich was born on 4 January 1956 in Seymour, Victoria. Aged 18, he entered the Royal Australian Naval College at Jervis Bay in January 1974.

== Naval career ==
As a junior officer Tripovich served in HMA Ships Duchess, Melbourne, Diamantina, Vendetta, Assail, Torrens, and Hobart. He completed the Royal Navy's Principal Warfare Officer's Course in 1984 and, specialising in anti-air warfare, returned to Australia to serve as the Direction Officer aboard HMAS Sydney.

In January 1986, Tripovich joined the Directorate of Naval User Requirements in Navy Headquarters Australia and was promoted to lieutenant commander in July 1986. He returned to sea in May 1987 as the Direction Officer, Senior Warfare Officer and Operations Officer in HMAS Brisbane. He was appointed as the Fleet Direction Officer on the staff of the Maritime Commander Australia in December 1988. Tripovich was awarded a Chief of Navy’s Commendation that year.

On promotion to commander in May 1990, Tripovich rejoined HMAS Brisbane as Executive Officer and saw active service during hostilities in the 1990–91 Persian Gulf War. He was awarded the Conspicuous Service Cross for his service during the ship's deployment.

Tripovich headed the Navy's Nulka Active Missile Decoy program during 1992–93 and attended the Joint Services Staff College in the first half of 1994. He commanded HMAS Canberra from September 1994 to May 1996, and then was Staff Officer to the Chief of the Defence Force until August 1997.

On promotion to captain, Tripovich became the Director of Maritime Combat Development at Australian Defence Force Headquarters (ADFHQ) in Canberra. Returning to sea in July 1999, he assumed command of HMAS Anzac, and again saw active service during INTERFET operations off East Timor later that year.

Promoted to commodore in April 2001, Tripovich was appointed Director General Naval Capability, Performance and Plans in Navy Headquarters. He rejoined the Fleet as Commodore Flotillas in June 2002 and led the Australian Fleet Sea Training Group, which was awarded a Chief of Defence Force Commendation for its collective contribution to the preparation of forces for a wide range of real world operations during his tenure. As Commodore Flotillas he also commanded the Deployable Joint Force Headquarters (Maritime), which provided deployed command staff for most of the major exercises and real world operations in which the RAN was involved, including operations in the Middle East and the Solomon Islands.

In February 2004, Tripovich moved ashore and became Director General Navy Personnel and Training at Navy Headquarters. He was promoted to rear admiral on 1 July 2005 and became Head of Capability Systems in Australian Defence Headquarters. In the Queen's Birthday Honours of 2005, he was appointed as a Member of the Order of Australia for "exceptional service to the Royal Australian Navy" in the three appointments that he held as a commodore.

On 28 September 2007, Tripovich was promoted to vice admiral and appointed Chief Capability Development Group. As a result of his "distinguished service" in this position and that of Capability Systems, he was upgraded to an Officer of the Order of Australia in June 2010. He relinquished this post in October 2010 on retirement from the ADF.

== Personal ==
Tripovich has a Graduate Diploma in Strategic Studies, is a graduate of the Australian Institute of Company Directors Course, a fellow of the Australian Institute of Company Directors (FAICD), is a graduate of Harvard Business School’s Advanced Management Program and a member of the Harvard Business School Alumni.

Tripovich married his wife Faye on 30 August 1980; the couple have a son, Daniel, and daughter, Kate. He rides a Harley Davidson, is an enthusiastic fly fisherman and enjoys watercolour painting. Tripovich is a member of the Canberra branch of the Commonwealth Club, the Naval Warfare Officers Association of Australia and of Canberra Legacy.

Military offices
Preceded by Lieutenant General David Hurley	Chief Capability Development Group; 2007–2010	Succeeded by Air Marshal John Harvey
Preceded by ?	Head of Capability Systems; 2005–2007	Succeeded by Air Vice Marshal John Quaife
