= Stephen Chappell =

Australian senior officer

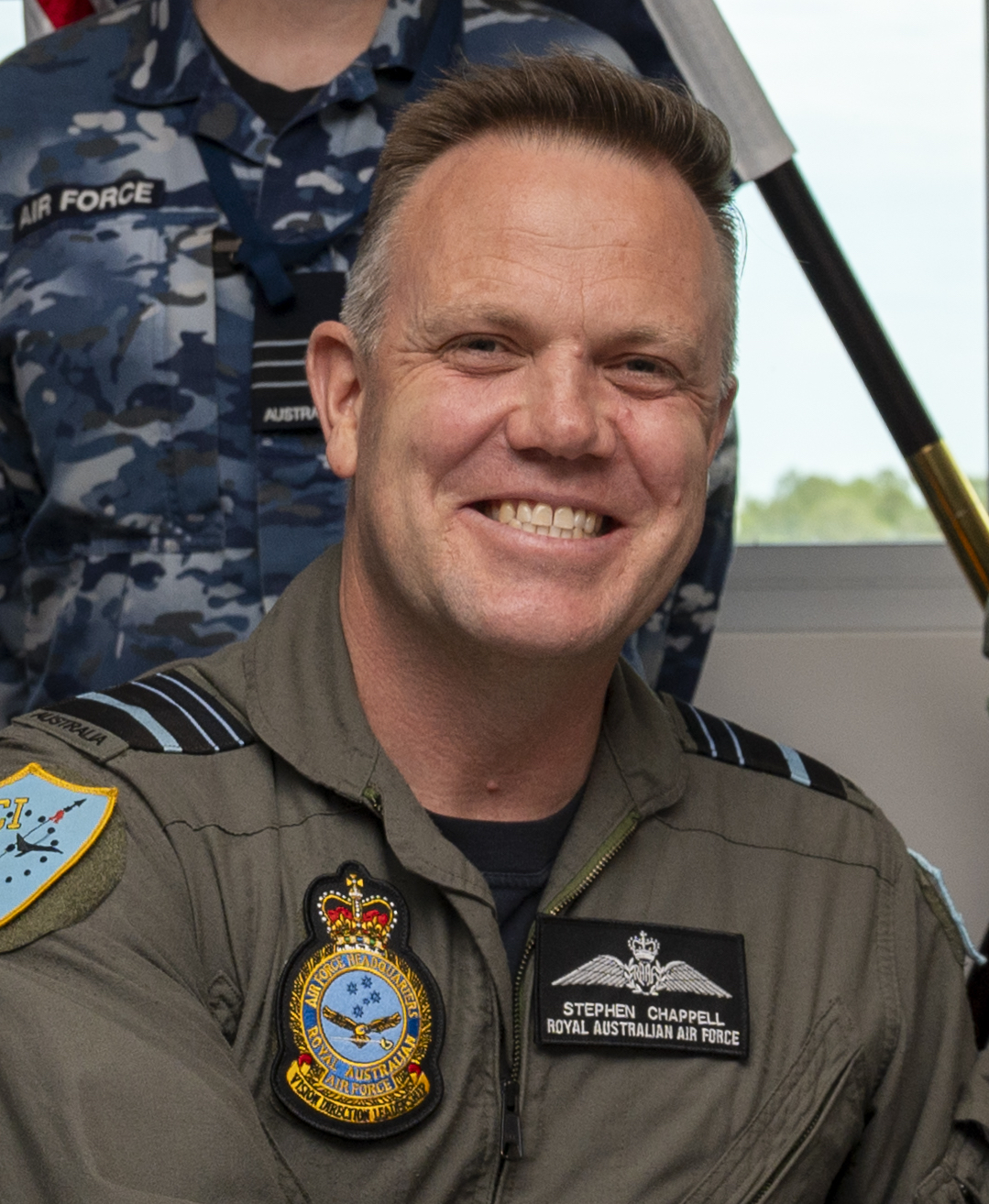
- Chappell in 2024
- Born: 1975 (age 50–51)
- Relatives: Greg Chappell (father)
- Military career
- Allegiance: Australia
- Branch: Royal Australian Air Force
- Service years: 1993–present
- Rank: Air Marshal
- Commands: Chief of Air Force (2024–); Head Military Strategic Commitments (2022–24); No. 82 Wing RAAF (2018–20); No. 1 Squadron RAAF (2013–16)
- Conflicts: Iraq War; War against the Islamic State
- Awards: Distinguished Service Cross; Conspicuous Service Cross; Medal of the Order of Australia; Meritorious Service Medal (United States)

Air Marshal Stephen Gareth Chappell, DSC, CSC, OAM (born 1975) is a senior officer in the Royal Australian Air Force (RAAF), currently serving as the chief of Air Force. He joined the RAAF through the Australian Defence Force Academy in 1993 and gained his pilot's wings in 1998. He has deployed on Operations Falconer and Okra to Iraq, and has commanded No. 1 Squadron RAAF (2013–16) and No. 82 Wing RAAF (2018–20). He served as head, Military Strategic Commitments from July 2022 to June 2024, and was appointed chief of Air Force on 3 July 2024.

== Early life and family ==
Chappell was born in 1975 to Judith (née Donaldson) and Greg Chappell. His father is a former professional cricketer, who was away on a cricketing tour of England when Stephen was born. He has a younger sister, Belinda, and a younger brother, Jonathan, who played Minor League Baseball for the Pulaski Blue Jays and the Rockford Riverhawks. Chappell's uncles are former Test cricketers Ian Chappell and Trevor Chappell, and he is the great-grandson of accomplished sportsman Vic Richardson.

Chappell was educated at Brisbane Grammar School, where he played in the First XI in cricket. According to his father, Chappell's interest in aviation was sparked by seeing the film Top Gun as a child.

== RAAF career ==
Chappell entered the Australian Defence Force Academy as a Royal Australian Air Force (RAAF) officer cadet in January 1993. He graduated from the academy with a Bachelor of Arts in 1995. Following flying training, he converted to the McDonnell Douglas F/A-18 Hornet and was posted to No. 75 Squadron RAAF in December 1998. He qualified as a Fighter Combat Instructor in 2001 and was then posted to No. 2 Operational Conversion Unit RAAF as an instructor. In 2003, Chappell returned to No. 75 Squadron to take part in Operation Falconer, Australia's contribution to the invasion of Iraq. He was one of the first Australians to fly on operations over Iraq, piloting an F/A-18 Hornet as escort to tanker, early-warning and control aircraft. Following his return to Australia, Chappell was promoted to squadron leader in 2004 and made a flight commander in No. 3 Squadron RAAF.

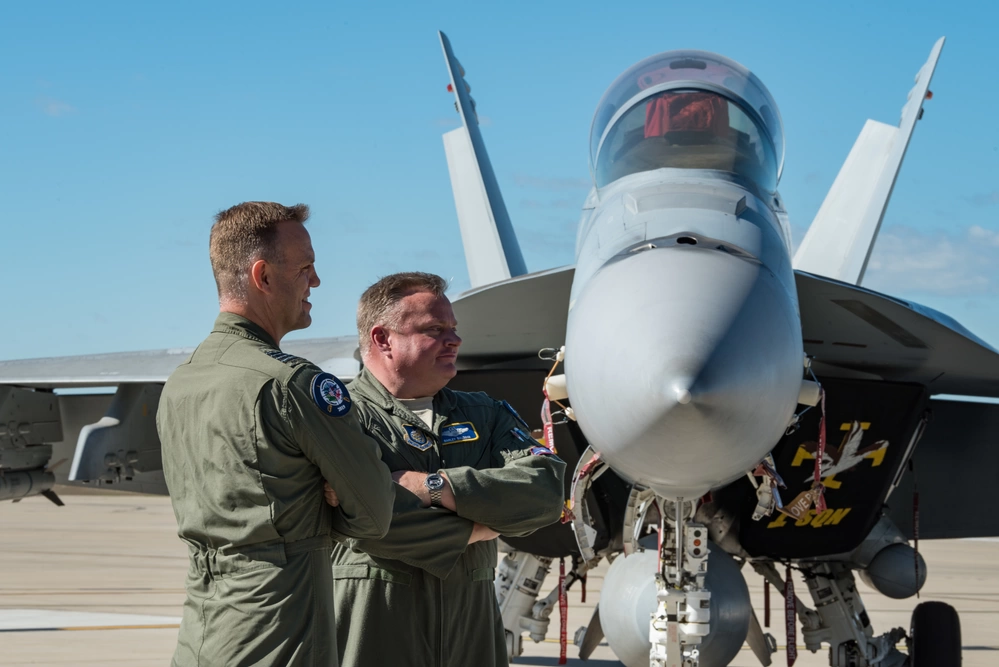
Group Captain Chappell (left) with Colonel Brian Baldwin of the United States Air Force in front of a F/A-18F Super Hornet from No. 1 Squadron RAAF during Exercise Talisman Sabre, July 2019

Selected for an exchange posting with the United States Air Force, Chappell served as the Assistant Director of Operations for the recently reactivated 65th Aggressor Squadron, based at Nellis Air Force Base in Nevada, from July 2005 to December 2007. During the exchange, Chappell authored five papers on communication standards, weapons employment and threat missile systems, and led the squadron in one Maple Flag and five Red Flag exercises. He was subsequently awarded the United States Meritorious Service Medal for the "exceptional initiative and vision" he demonstrated in his work with the squadron. Returning to Australia, Chappell was made executive officer of No. 2 Operational Conversion Unit in 2008, a staff officer at No. 81 Wing RAAF in January 2010 and, following promotion to wing commander in April 2011, was appointed to the staff of Air Combat Group Headquarters. In the 2013 Queen's Birthday Honours, Chappell was awarded the Medal of the Order of Australia for his "meritorious service to the Royal Australian Air Force in the field of Air Combat".

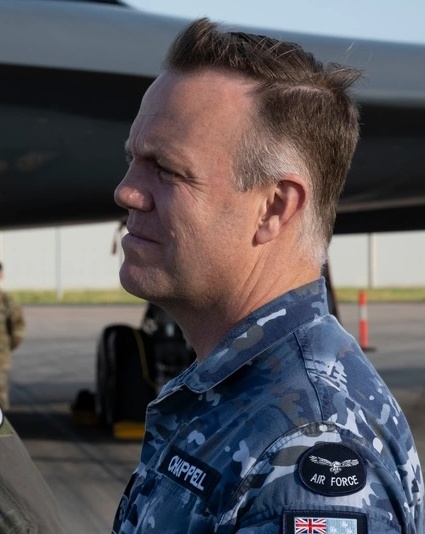
Chappell at RAAF Base Amberley in 2024

Chappell graduated from the Australian Command and Staff College with a Master of Military and Strategic Studies in 2013. That December, he was appointed commanding officer of No. 1 Squadron RAAF. In September 2014, he deployed with the squadron to Al Minhad Air Base in the United Arab Emirates as part of Air Task Group 630 on Operation Okra, Australia's contribution to the war against the Islamic State. Chappell returned to Australia in April 2015 and relinquished command of the squadron in June 2016. In January 2017, as part of the Australia Day Honours, he was awarded the Conspicuous Service Cross for "outstanding achievement in air combat development and preparedness" as commander of No. 1 Squadron and, in the Queen's Birthday Honours that June, he received the Distinguished Service Cross in recognition of his "distinguished command and leadership" on Operation Okra.

After serving as executive officer of No. 82 Wing RAAF, Chappell completed the Defence and Strategic Studies Course at the Australian College of Defence and Strategic Studies in 2017. He then spent twelve months as chief of staff to the Chief of the Defence Force, serving Air Chief Marshal Mark Binskin and then General Angus Campbell, before assuming command of No. 82 Wing in December 2018. Promoted to air commodore in November 2020, Chappell was made Director General Air Command Operations. He was promoted to air vice-marshal and appointed Head Military Strategic Commitments in July 2022.

In April 2024 the Minister of Defence, Richard Marles, announced that Chappell would be appointed Chief of Air Force in July 2024. He succeeded Air Marshal Robert Chipman in the role on 3 July.

Military offices
Preceded by Air Marshal Robert Chipman	Chief of Air Force; 2024–present	Incumbent
Preceded by Air Vice-Marshal Robert Chipman	Head Military Strategic Commitments; 2022–2024	Succeeded by Rear Admiral Jonathan Earley
