= Operation Solace =

1992–93 Australian mission in Somalia

Operation Solace (UNITAF)
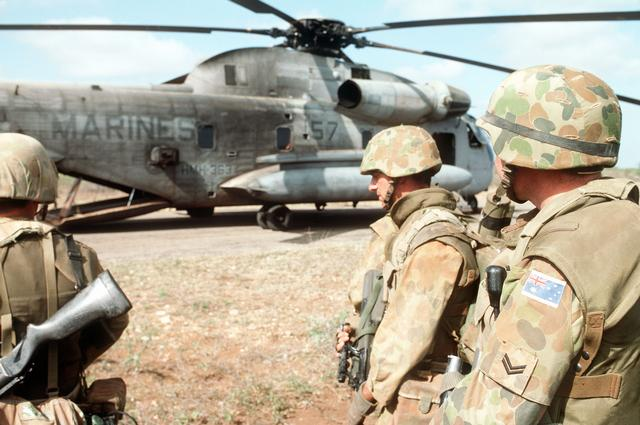
- Australian soldiers prepare to board a United States Marine Corps helicopter in Somalia
- Objective: Australian peacemaking deployment to Somalia
- Outcome: Reduction in violence, Australian units left on their scheduled date
- Casualties: Lance Corporal Shannon McAliney: 2nd April 1993

Operation Solace was the Australian Defence Force's main contribution to the Unified Task Force (UNITAF) which was a United States led, United Nations sanctioned, multinational force which operated in the Republic of Somalia from 9 December 1992 to 4 May 1993. Codenamed Operation Restore Hope, UNITAF was charged with carrying out United Nations Security Council Resolution 794: to create a protected environment for conducting humanitarian operations in the southern half of the Republic of Somalia.

Operation Solace centred on the deployment of the 1st Battalion, Royal Australian Regiment (1RAR) battalion group to Baidoa in south-central Somalia. The 1 RAR battalion group replaced the 3rd Battalion, 9th United States Marine Regiment in Baidoa on 19 January 1993. The Battalion group was successful in improving the security situation and earned the respect of the non-government aid organisations operating in the region. The 1 RAR battalion group left Somalia on 21 May 1993.

The main Australian units deployed to Somalia during Operation Solace were:

- Royal Australian Regiment Group (1RAR Gp, 990 people, Australian Army)
  - 1st Battalion, Royal Australian Regiment (1RAR)
  - B Squadron, 3rd/4th Cavalry regiment
  - selected components of the regular army
- HMAS Jervis Bay and Tobruk with 817 Squadron Fleet Air Arm (220 people, Royal Australian Navy)
- Royal Australian Air Force logistical support.

The unit received the following medals and awards.

- Australian Active Service Medal with Somalia Clasp
- Australian Service Medal
- Infantry Combat Badge / Army Combat Badge
- Meritorious Unit Citation
