= Greg Bilton =

Australian general

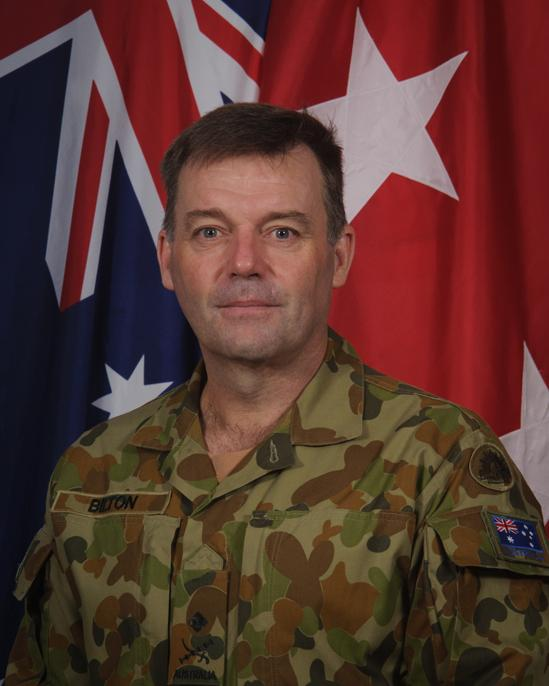
- Greg Bilton in 2014
- Born: 2 March 1965 (age 61); Melbourne, Victoria
- Military career
- Allegiance: Australia
- Branch: Australian Army
- Service years: 1983–2024
- Rank: Lieutenant General
- Unit: Royal Australian Artillery
- Commands: Chief of Joint Operations; Forces Command; Deputy Chief of Joint Operations; Deputy Commanding General – Operations; 7th Brigade; 4th Field Regiment; 104th Field Battery
- Conflicts: Multinational Force and Observers; War in Afghanistan
- Awards: Officer of the Order of Australia; Conspicuous Service Cross; Meritorious Service Medal (Canada); Officer of the Legion of Merit (United States); Defence Cooperation Medal (Japan)

Lieutenant General Gregory Charles Bilton, AO, CSC (born 2 March 1965) is a retired senior officer of the Australian Army. He joined the army via the Royal Military College, Duntroon in 1983 and was commissioned into the Royal Australian Artillery. He commanded the 104th Field Battery, 4th Field Regiment and 7th Brigade, and deployed on operations to the Sinai and Afghanistan. He was seconded to the United States Army Pacific as Deputy Commanding General – Operations from 2014 to 2017, served as Deputy Chief of Joint Operations from 2017 to 2018, and was Commander Forces Command from December 2018 to June 2019. His final appointment was as Chief of Joint Operations, from July 2019 to July 2024.

== Early life and education ==
Bilton was born in Melbourne, Victoria, on 2 March 1965, and educated at Melbourne High School. He is married to Rachel, a registered nurse, and the couple have two adult sons.

Bilton holds a Bachelor of Military Studies, a Master of Military Art and Science, and a Master of Strategic Studies. He is also a graduate of the United States Army Command and General Staff College and the Centre for Defence and Strategic Studies, and has completed the Long Gunnery Course at the British Army's Royal School of Artillery.

== Military career ==
Bilton entered the Royal Military College, Duntroon, as an Australian Army officer cadet in 1983. On graduating in 1986, he was commissioned a lieutenant in the Royal Australian Artillery. He subsequently received appointments within the 1st and 4th Regiments, Royal Australian Artillery, the 8th/12th Regiment, Royal Australian Artillery, and to the School of Artillery. In 1993, Bilton deployed to the Sinai Peninsula as part of Operation Mazurka, Australia's contribution to the Multinational Force and Observers.

Bilton has commanded the 104th Field Battery and the 4th Regiment, Royal Australian Artillery. In between these appointments, he has served in staff postings with the Directorate of Officer Career Management and the Directorate of Force Structure (Army) within Army Headquarters, and served as a instructor at the Australian Command and Staff College. In recognition of his "outstanding achievement" in a number of staff appointments, then Lieutenant Colonel Bilton was awarded the Conspicuous Service Cross in the 2004 Australia Day Honours. In 2008, Bilton was posted to Afghanistan as Deputy Chief of Staff for Security Sector Reform in Regional Command South. He was rewarded with the Canadian Meritorious Service Medal for his performance in this position.

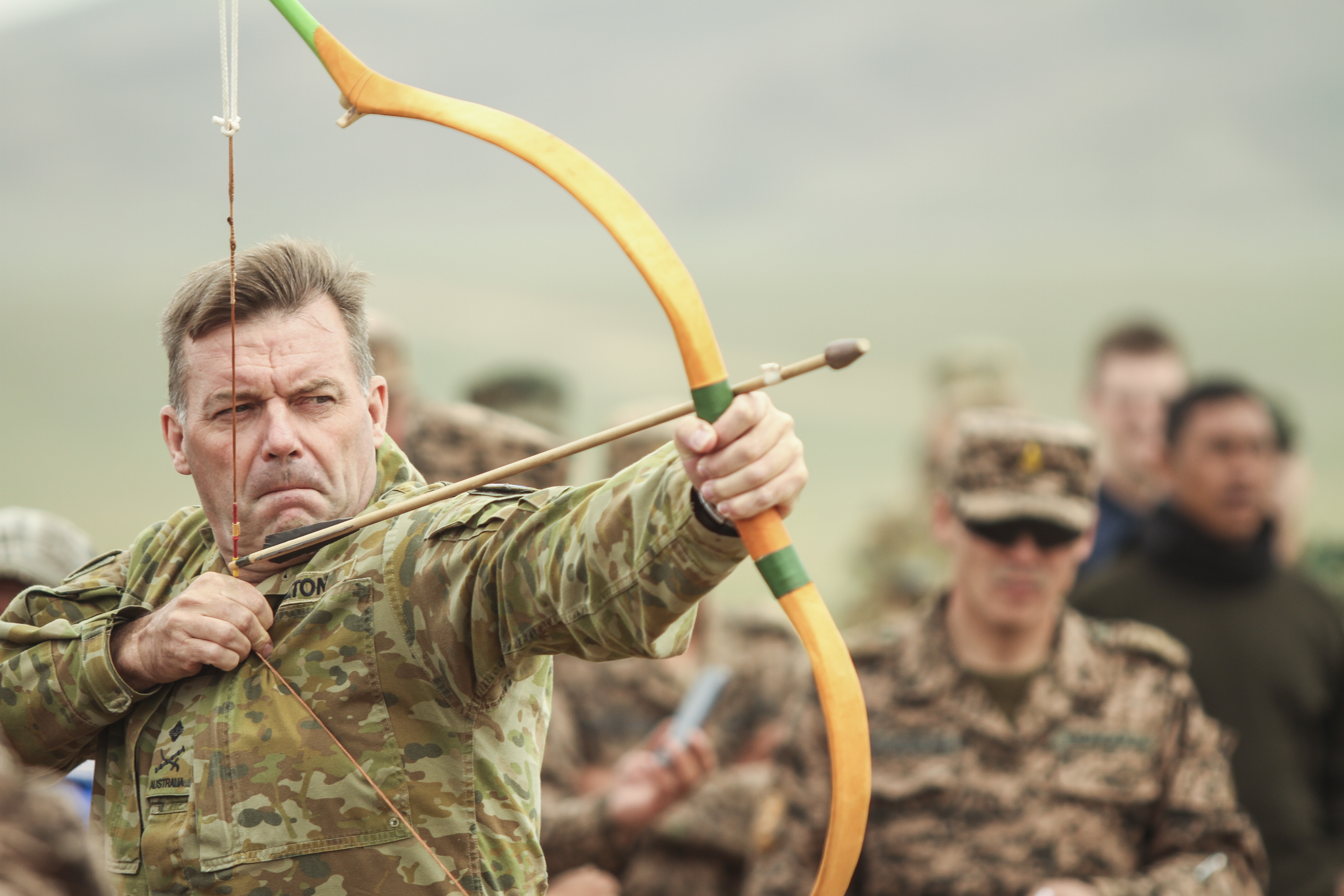
Greg Bilton participates in a Mongolian Naadam Festival in 2016.

Following his return to Australia, Bilton was posted as Director General Development and Plans (Army) and later appointed to command the 7th Brigade. Bilton was cited for his "exceptional service" in these roles and was appointed a Member of the Order of Australia in the 2014 Queen's Birthday Honours. On 17 November 2014, he was seconded to the United States Army Pacific and succeeded fellow Australian, Major General Rick Burr, as Deputy Commanding General – Operations. Bilton returned to Australia in 2017, having been awarded the United States Legion of Merit and the Japanese Defence Cooperation Medal for his service with the United States Army, and was posted as Deputy Chief of Joint Operations. He was appointed as Commander Forces Command in December 2018.

Bilton was promoted lieutenant general in June 2019 and succeeded Air Marshal Mel Hupfeld as Chief of Joint Operations on 1 July. He was advanced to Officer of the Order of Australia in the 2020 Australia Day Honours.

Military offices
| Preceded by Air Marshal Mel Hupfeld | Chief of Joint Operations; 2019–2024 | Succeeded by Vice Admiral Justin Jones |
| Preceded by Major General Gus McLachlan | Commander Forces Command; 2018–2019 | Succeeded by Major General Chris Field |
| Preceded by Major General Stuart Smith | Deputy Chief of Joint Operations; 2017–2018 | Succeeded by Major General Roger Noble |
| Preceded by Major General Rick Burr | Deputy Commanding General – Operations; United States Army Pacific; 2014–2017 | Succeeded by Major General Roger Noble |
