= Chris Field (general) =

Australian general

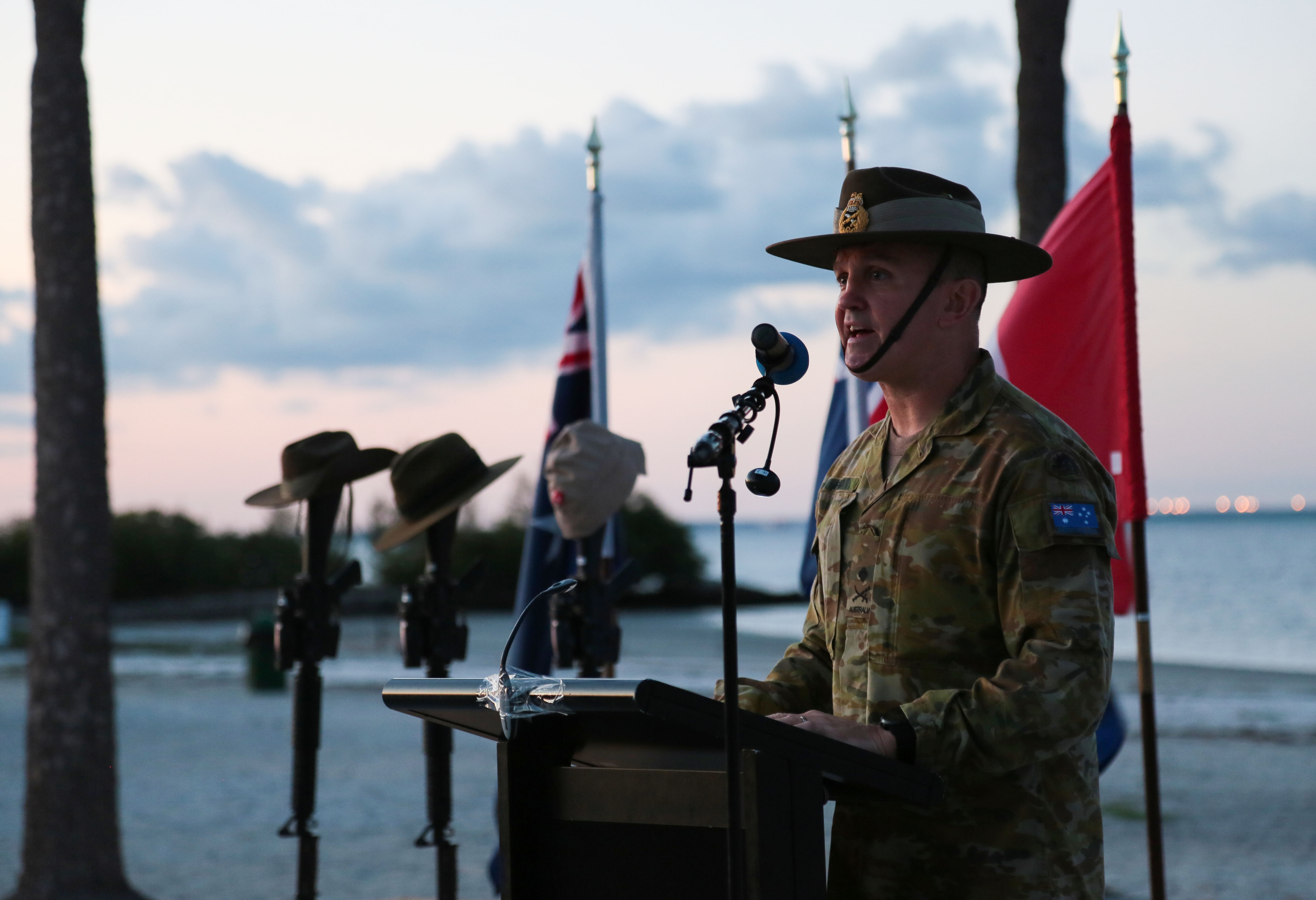
- Major General Chris Field speaking at an Anzac Day service at MacDill Air Force Base, Florida, in 2018
- Military career
- Allegiance: Australia
- Branch: Australian Army
- Service years: 1984–2023
- Rank: Major General
- Commands: Forces Command (2019–20); 3rd Brigade (2015–17); Combined Joint Task Force 635 (2004–05); 1st Battalion, Royal Australian Regiment (2003–05)
- Conflicts: International Force East Timor; War in Afghanistan; Iraq War
- Awards: Distinguished Service Cross; Member of the Order of Australia; Conspicuous Service Cross; Commendation for Distinguished Service; Officer of the Legion of Merit (United States); Bronze Star Medal (United States); NATO Meritorious Service Medal

Major General Christopher Antony Field, DSC, AM, CSC is a retired senior officer of the Australian Army. He joined the army via the Australian Defence Force Academy in 1984 and was commissioned into the Royal Australian Infantry Corps. He has commanded the 1st Battalion, Royal Australian Regiment (2003–05), Combined Joint Task Force 635 (2004–05) and the 3rd Brigade (2015–17), coordinated reconstruction efforts in Queensland in the wake of the 2010–11 Queensland floods and Cyclone Debbie, and deployed on operations to East Timor, Iraq, the Solomon Islands and Afghanistan. He was Commander Forces Command from June 2019 to February 2020, Deputy Commanding General – Operations for United States Army Central from March 2020 to November 2021, and was Assistant to the Chief of the Defence Force from 2022 until his retirement in 2023.

== Military career ==
Field entered the Australian Defence Force Academy as an Australian Army officer cadet in 1984. He graduated with a Bachelor of Arts degree and, following additional training at the Royal Military College, Duntroon, was commissioned into the Royal Australian Infantry Corps. During his early career, Field served as a rifle platoon commander and mortar line officer in the 2nd/4th Battalion, Royal Australian Regiment, deployed for service with the United Nations Truce Supervision Organization in 1996–97, was adjutant of an Australian Army Reserve unit, served as an instructor at Duntroon, and commanded companies in the 2nd Battalion, Royal Australian Regiment (2RAR). He was operations officer when 2RAR deployed as part of the International Force East Timor in September 1999. For his "distinguished performance of duties" during the operation, Field was awarded a Commendation for Distinguished Service in March 2000.

As a lieutenant colonel, Field was seconded to the United States Army in 2002 and was an operational planner in the Third Army during the early stages of the United States' Operation Iraqi Freedom and Australia's Operation Falconer during the Iraq War. For his "outstanding achievement in strategic analysis and operational planning" in this role, Field was awarded the Conspicuous Service Cross in November 2003 and the United States Bronze Star Medal in March 2005. Field was appointed commanding officer of the 1st Battalion, Royal Australian Regiment (1RAR) from December 2003. In December 2004, Field led a deployment of his battalion's A Company to the Solomon Islands and assumed command of Combined Joint Task Force 635. The Australian government had recently drawn back its military commitment to the Regional Assistance Mission to Solomon Islands (RAMSI). After Australian Federal Police officer Adam Dunning was ambushed and killed while conducting a patrol on 22 December, however, the Australian government committed Field and his soldiers to reinforce RAMSI and enhance security in the region.

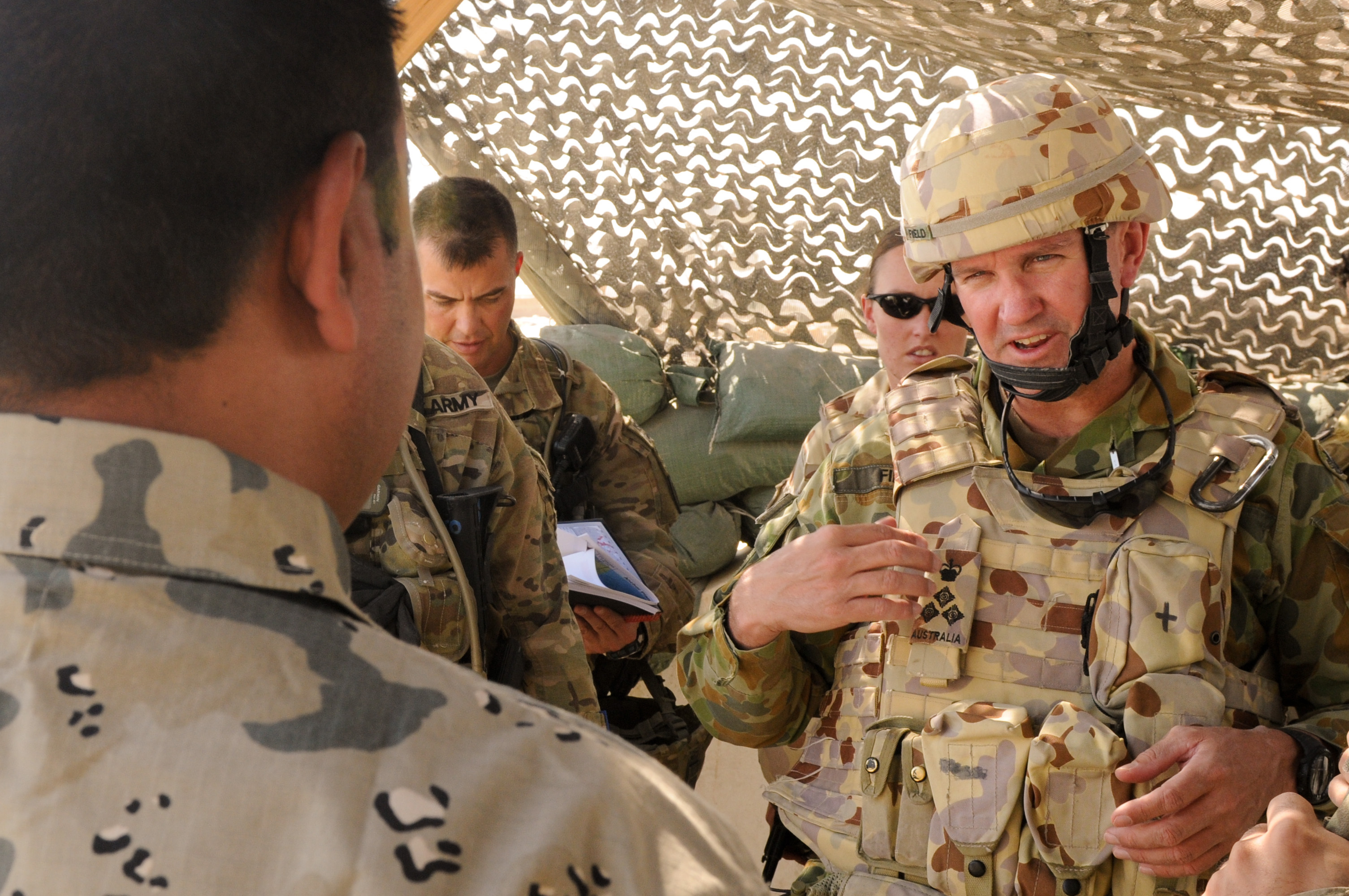
Field (right) at the Weesh Border Crossing in Spin Boldak, Afghanistan, to assess the security situation of the border with Pakistan, 19 October 2011.

On relinquishing command of 1RAR in December 2005, Field was appointed J3 Operations to the 1st Division and Deployable Joint Force Headquarters. He then served as Director Future Land Warfare and Strategy at Australian Army headquarters and, in January 2011, was appointed Chief of Operations and Plans, Queensland Reconstruction Authority to assist in the recovery and reconstruction efforts in the wake of the 2010–11 Queensland floods. Later that year, Field was promoted to brigadier and was again seconded to the United States Army. He served as Deputy Commanding General – Force Development in the 82nd Airborne Division during an operational deployment to Kandahar, Afghanistan, for which he was awarded the NATO Meritorious Service Medal. He returned to Australia in 2012 as chief of staff in Forces Command and was appointed Regimental Colonel of the Royal Australian Regiment and Head of Corps of the Royal Australian Infantry. Field's "exceptional service" in these postings was recognised with his appointment as a Member of the Order of Australia in the 2016 Queen's Birthday Honours.

In 2015, Field was appointed commander of the 3rd Brigade in Townsville, Queensland. He additionally assumed the role of Queensland State Recovery Coordinator, overseeing the efforts to recover and rebuilt Queensland communities following the severe tropical Cyclone Debbie, in March 2017. Field handed over command of the 3rd Brigade to Brigadier Scott Winter in November that year and, promoted to major general, was posted to the United States as Vice Director of Operations and Plans in United States Central Command. During the eighteen-month posting, Field oversaw United States and coalition operations in the Middle East. He returned to Australia and succeeded Major General Greg Bilton as Commander Forces Command in June 2019. As Commander Forces Command, Field mobilised approximately 6,000 personnel as part of Operation Bushfire Assist, the Australian Army's response to the severe bushfires that burnt throughout southeast Australia over summer 2019–2020.

Field handed over leadership of Forces Command to Major General Matt Pearse in February 2020 and, in March, was posted to the United States as Deputy Commanding General – Operations for United States Army Central. In this role, Field deployed to United States Army Central's forward headquarters in Kuwait in October 2020, where he was involved in supporting Operations Inherent Resolve, Freedom's Sentinel and Spartan Shield, as well as the Multinational Force and Observers. In recognition of his "exceptional leadership, professionalism and uncompromising commitment", showing "distinguished command and leadership in warlike operations" in the Middle East, Field was awarded the Distinguished Service Cross in the 2022 Australia Day Honours. Following his return to Australia, Field was appointed Assistant to the Chief of the Defence Force.

Field is a graduate of the University of Southern Queensland, the Marine Corps University, Deakin University, and the Australian Institute of Company Directors.

== Personal life ==
Field is married to Sarah Kendall, with whom he has one son. He is a former director of Ronald McDonald House in North Queensland, a previous member of the Townsville District Community Policing Board and the Regional Managers’ Coordination Network, Townsville, and is Patron and past-President of the Australian Services Rugby Referees Association.

== Bibliography ==
- Blaxland, John (2008). "Near and Far: Operations, 1999–2006". In Horner, David; Bou, Jean (eds.). Duty First: A History of the Royal Australian Regiment (2nd ed.). Sydney: Allen & Unwin. pp. 306–346. ISBN 9780044422273.
- Horner, David; Bou, Jean, eds. (2008). "Appendix C: Commanding Officers". Duty First: A History of the Royal Australian Regiment (2nd ed.). Sydney: Allen & Unwin. pp. 438–444. ISBN 9780044422273.

Military offices
Preceded by Major General Greg Bilton	Commander Forces Command; 2019–2020	Succeeded by Major General Matt Pearse
