= Operation Paladin =

Operation Paladin is Australia's contribution to the UN Truce Supervision Organisation (UNTSO) that was established in 1948 to supervise the truce agreed at the conclusion of the first Arab/Israeli War.

Involving Israel, Syria, Lebanon and Jordan, Australian personnel have supported this operation since 1956. According to the Australian Department of Defence, "members of the Australian contingent may be employed in a variety of roles including staff officers in the UNTSO Headquarters in Jerusalem and military observers in a variety of locations". On 12 January 1988, one officer assigned to the operation, Captain Peter McCarthy was killed when by a landmine while conducting a vehicle mounted patrol in southern Lebanon. Other Australians have also been kidnapped and assaulted during the course of their duties.

In 1995, there were 13 personnel assigned to the operation, although in 2009 there were 11 personnel assigned, with the most senior being an Australian Army lieutenant colonel. As of 2018, 12 personnel were assigned in an unarmed role. As part of the rotation, Australians have on occasion also served as UNTSO chief of staff. Officers who have filled this role include Major Generals Ian Gordon and Tim Ford.
