= Army Combat Badge =

- Type: Military decoration
- Awarded for: The Army Combat Badge (ACB) is awarded to any member of the Australian Defence Force (ADF) for service with an Army combat element in warlike operations
- Description: Two crossed swords surrounded by a laurel wreath
- Presented by: Australian Army Headquarters
- Status: Currently awarded

Precedence
- Equivalent: Infantry Combat Badge

The Army Combat Badge (ACB) is a military decoration that is awarded to any member of the Australian Defence Force (ADF) for service with an Army combat element in warlike operations. Its equivalent is the Infantry Combat Badge.

== History ==
In 1970, the Infantry Combat Badge was instituted to recognise the service of Army personnel in battle or on operations; however, only personnel serving as infantry were eligible for the award. The Army Combat Badge (ACB) was instituted in 2005 to recognise the unique service of non infantry personnel operating with an Arms Corps unit within a warlike area of operations.

The decoration is one of the few awarded by Army Headquarters; the majority of other Australian military honours and awards are issued by the Directorate of Honours and Awards.

== Eligibility ==
To be eligible to be issued the ACB, a member must have:

1. been force assigned to a combat team for a period of either a continuous or an aggregate of 90 days satisfactory service; or
2. been physically deployed in the same geographical location as a Combat Team and have a primary role to directly support that Combat Team for a period of either a continuous or an aggregate of 90 days satisfactory service.
3. been serving on warlike operations; and
4. not been previously issued the Infantry Combat Badge (ICB) or ACB.
