= Chief Capability Development Group =

Former head of the Capability Development Group, Australian Department of Defence

Chief Capability Development Group (CCDG) of Australian Department of Defence
- Term length: (nominally) Three years (renewable)
- Inaugural holder: LTGEN David Hurley
- Website: defence.gov.au/Leaders/

The Chief of Capability Development Group (CCDG) was head of the Capability Development Group (CDG) in the Australian Department of Defence, part of the Australian Defence Organisation. This position was created in December 2003 and disbanded through the amalgamation of the Capability Development Group and the Defence Materiel Organisation into the Defence Capability Acquisition and Sustainment Group from 2015.

The appointed officer was responsible to the diarchy of the Chief of the Defence Force and the Secretary of Defence.

== Capability Development Group ==
The role of the Capability Development Group (CDG) was to develop and gain Australian Government approval for future defence capabilities. The CDG has a close relationship with the Defence Materiel Organisation) and oversaw the implementation of Defence Procurement Review recommendations.

As sponsor, CDG was responsible for developing capability proposals consistent with strategic priorities, funding guidance, legislation and policy, for consideration and approval by Government. In particular, the work of the Group focused on:

- Defence's Major Capability Expenditure (MCE) investment program; (Note: "Major" means equipment projects of: $20 million or more, or; less than $20 million, but with individual items of $1 million or more, or; less than $20 million with strategic significance) and
- Capability Definition, comprising the Needs Phase and the Requirements Phase of the Capability Development process.

CCDG, along with the Vice Chief of the Defence Force (VCDF), the Chief Finance Officer (CFO) and the Chief Defence Scientist (CDS), (all are 3 star level positions), comprised the Owner Support Executives.

=== Department heads ===
- Head Capability System: Vacant
- First assistant secretary capability investment & resources: Michael Gibson
- Assistant secretary capability & plans: Ben Coleman
- Executive director group support: Warren Nelson
- Director-General Australian defence test & evaluation office: CAPT John Renwick, RAN

== Chief Capability Development Group ==
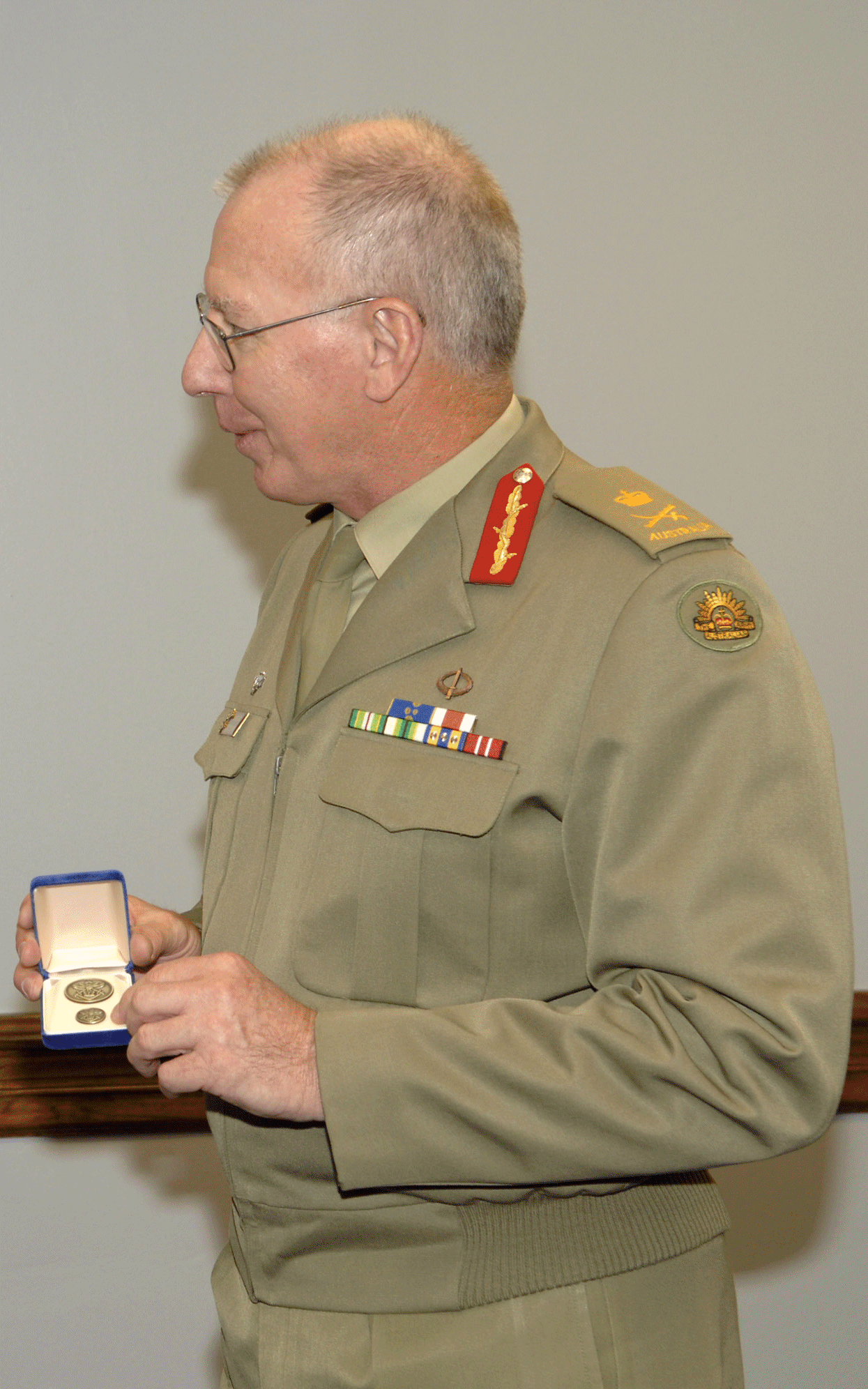
LTGEN David Hurley

The following officers have been appointed as Chief of the Capability Development Group:

Rank	Name	Post- nominals	Service	Term began	Term ended	Time in Appointment	Notes
Lieutenant General	David Hurley	AO, DSC	Army	December 2003	September 2007	3 years, 274 days	
Vice Admiral	Matt Tripovich	AO, CSC, RAN	RAN	September 2007	October 2010	3 years, 30 days	
Air Marshal	John Harvey	AM	RAAF	October 2010	November 2011	1 year, 31 days	
Vice Admiral	Peter Jones	AO, DSC, RAN	RAN	November 2011	31 October 2014	2 years, 364 days	
Lieutenant General	John Caligari	AO, DSC	Army	31 October 2014	20 August 2015	293 days	
Air Vice Marshal	Mel Hupfeld	AO, DSC	RAAF	20 August 2015	2016	1 years, 3,670 days	
