= Infantry Combat Badge =

- Infantry Combat Badge: Bronze bayonet surrounded by laurel wreath.
- Type: Military decoration
- Awarded for: The Infantry Combat Badge (ICB) is awarded to serving members of the Australian Army for service as an Infantryman in warlike operations
- Description: Bronze laurel wreath surrounding bayonet
- Presented by: Australian Army
- Status: Currently awarded

Precedence
- Equivalent: Army Combat Badge

The Infantry Combat Badge (ICB) is awarded to serving members of the Australian Army for service as an infantryman in "warlike" operations.

Its equivalent for members operating with an Arms Corps Unit within a warlike area of operations is the Army Combat Badge.

== History ==
The ICB was first established in July 1970 for recognition of infantry service in battle or on operations, following the decision of the Military Board in January 1970. The role of the infantry is to seek out and close with the enemy, to kill or capture him, to seize and to hold ground, to repel attack, by night and day, regardless of season, weather or terrain. The purpose of the ICB is to recognize this unique role and the particular training, skills and hardships attendant upon service as an infantryman. In exceptional circumstances, the ICB may be awarded to members of other corps, where they have qualified for it as infantrymen.

In January 1970, Lieutenant General Sir Thomas Daly KBE, DSO, as the Chief of the General Staff and part of the Military Board, laid the original basis for the ICB. He is recorded in the minutes as saying, "whilst he appreciated the views expressed (in the Military Board), it was to be borne in mind that the proposed badge was meant to be a visible distinction for the infantryman and was not a general combat badge. He said the other corps had their responsibilities and neither their worth nor performance, were in question. However he could not accept that an infantry award should be granted to members of other corps unless they qualified for it as infantrymen."

The Army Combat Badge (ACB) was instituted in 2005 to recognise the unique service of a member operating with an Arms Corps Unit within a warlike area of operations.

== Specific eligibility ==
Any member of the Australian Army who:

- was on continuous full-time service as an infantryman at the time of deployment;
- has given satisfactory service as an infantryman;
- has served either a continuous or an aggregate of 90 days satisfactory service on warlike operations for a single deployment or operation; and
- has not been previously issued the ICB.

Under exceptional circumstances, the Approval Authority may approve the issue of the ICB to members on exchange/attachment duties for service with allied units who meet the criteria, and/or to members who would have met the criteria had they not been killed, wounded, disabled or evacuated.
