= Headquarters Joint Operations Command (Australia) =

Worldwide operations headquarters of the Australian Defence Force

Coordinates: 35°20′39″S 149°22′32″E

- Active: 2004–present
- Country: Australia
- Type: Joint Headquarters
- Size: 550 (up to 1400)
- Part of: Australian Defence Force
- Garrison/HQ: Kowen, Australian Capital Territory

Commanders
- Chief of Joint Operations: Lieutenant General Greg Bilton

Headquarters Joint Operations Command (HQJOC) is the Australian Defence Force's (ADF) operational-level headquarters responsible for the command and control of ADF operations worldwide. It was formed from "Headquarters Australian Theatre" (HQAST) in 2004 to reflect the changing internal structure of the ADF and the need to establish a purpose-built, co-located joint headquarters. Since December 2008, it has been based in NSW adjacent to the Kowen district of the Australian Capital Territory (just south of the Kings Highway, about 15 km east of Queanbeyan and 15 km south of Bungendore). The complex is known as the General John Baker Complex, named after a former Chief of Defence Force who was a strong advocate of joint command and control.

== Headquarters Australian Theatre ==
Headquarters Australian Theatre (HQAST) was established in a temporary facility at Potts Point, Sydney, in 1996 as the ADF's first operational level joint headquarters. Prior to that, ADF's offshore operations were commanded by the "environmental commands" of the three Services, also known as the "component commands":

- Maritime Headquarters (MHQ) at Garden Island, Potts Point;
- Land Headquarters (LHQ) at Victoria Barracks, Sydney (in Paddington); and
- Headquarters Air Command (HQAC) at RAAF Glenbrook west of Sydney at the foot of the Blue Mountains.

When HQAST was established in 1996, it was intended to provide the ADF with a single headquarters to command the forces of all three services when deployed on operations. The three services retained the responsibility for raising, training and sustaining their forces, but they then "force assigned" their troops to Commander Australian Theatre (COMAST) for the duration of any operational deployments.

== Headquarters Joints Operations Command ==
The concept was taken a step further with the establishment of Headquarters Joints Operations Command (HQJOC) in 2004. The headquarters remained in the same temporary facility at Potts Point, but the commander was re-designated Chief of Joint Operations (CJOPS) and raised from two-star to three-star rank level. Instead of creating a new three-star position, the Vice Chief of the Defence Force (VCDF) was initially dual-hatted as VCDF and CJOPS. The environmental commands, and a number of other operational level headquarters' elements across the ADF, were designated as "components" of HQJOC. This meant, for example, that in addition to being responsible to Chief of Army for raising, training and sustaining ground forces, the Land Commander Australia (LCAUST) was also designated the "Land Component Commander" (LCC) of HQJOC, and was responsible to CJOPS for a range of operational issues involving the Land Component of the ADF.

=== HQJOC(T) ===
Following an extensive review of ADF Command and Control by Major General Richard Wilson in 2005 (known as "The Wilson Review"), HQJOC was re-structured and increased its staffing nearly fivefold in January 2007. It was officially designated as "HQJOC (Transitional)" for the two-year period 2007–2008 while awaiting the construction of a new purpose-built facility at Kowen, about half-way between Bungendore and Queanbeyan to the east of Canberra. The most significant changes to the headquarters during this period were:

- the creation of a 24/7 Joint Control Centre,
- the establishment of five one-star level branch heads (Operations, Plans, Support, Intelligence, and Air), and
- the expansion and re-location of Plans Branch into a temporary facility at Fairbairn, Canberra.

Operations Branch remained at the facility at Potts Point, and the other branches (Support, Intelligence and Air) were either located within the Russell Offices area, or divided between these three locations.

In September 2007, the Minister of Defence announced that a new separate three-star position had been created for CJOPS; the VCDF position was then left to focus on more strategic matters.

=== HQJOC(B) ===
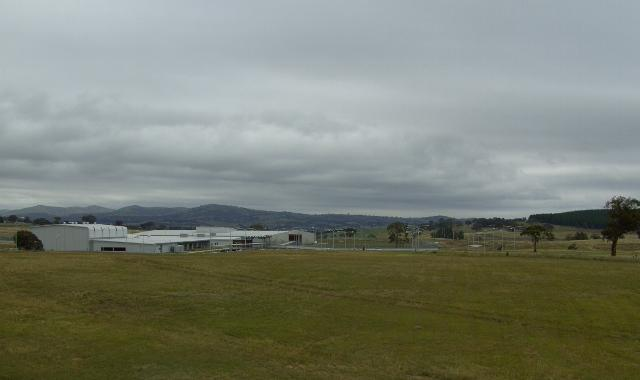
L-R: Gymnasium, Mess, 100m gate entrance, main building, car park, 100m fence. To the right is part of the Kowen forest in the Australian Capital Territory

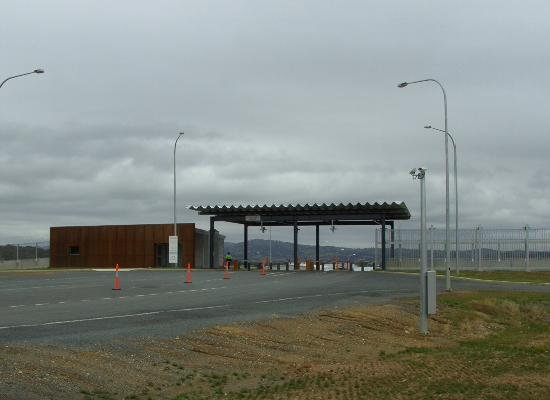
Main entrance (500m gate)

Initially named HQJOC(Bungendore), occupation of the permanent headquarters near Kowen, Australian Capital Territory, commenced in early December 2008, and subsequently all 550 staff from all branches have collocated in the one purpose-built facility, (named the "General John Baker Complex"), along with the Headquarters of the Special Operations Commander Australia (SOCOM/SOCAUST). The Baker Complex is located adjacent to the Kowen district of the Australian Capital Territory, about 25 km east of Canberra city, 15 km east of Queanbeyan and 15 km south-southwest of Bungendore. It is situated just to the south of the Bombala railway line that delineates the border between New South Wales and the Australian Capital Territory, although access to the site is from the Kings Highway in the Kowen district via a restricted-access, Defence-owned road that passes under the railway line. The site is part of NSW but is part of the ACT defence district, its postal address is 'Canberra, ACT', and staff adhere to ACT public holidays. A secondary entrance road also provides access to the site from the Captains Flat road. The site is about 4 km north-west from the Molonglo Observatory Synthesis Telescope, and particular arrangements were needed at the complex so that electrical interference is not emitted. The two-storey main Headquarters building is located inside two security fences, one at a 100m radius from the building, the other at 500m. The complex spans in 220 hectares in total

The new building was constructed by Praeco Pty Ltd, a consortium comprising Leighton Contractors and ABN AMRO, the latter selling its stake to Industry Funds Management shortly after completion of the facility. The contract deed between Defence and Praeco covers the capital cost of the buildings and infrastructure for the facility, and the cost of providing a range of contracted services such as access control, cleaning, administrative support, waste removal and maintenance services over the 30-year contract term. Defence has contracted to pay Praeco an Annual Service Payment, commencing when the facility was completed in July 2008; the first full-year payment to be A$39.99 million, in 2009–10. The whole-of-life nett present cost to Defence for the provision by Praeco of the buildings, infrastructure and services over the 30-year term is A$572 million. Praeco commenced construction in November 2006, with completion in July 2008.

The Baker Complex was officially named the General John Baker Complex and opened by Prime Minister Kevin Rudd on 7 March 2009, with Mrs Baker joining various officials for the ceremony and unveiling a bronze bust of her husband.

== Current responsibilities ==
Staff at work in the HQJOC Joint Control Centre at Bungendore, November 2011

Under CJOPS, HQJOC is responsible for the command and control of all Australian Defence Force operations worldwide. This means that each of the ADF's Task Forces (their commanders being Commander(s), Task Force, or CTF) and Joint Task Forces (JTF), and the Australian contingents to UN peace monitoring operations, are directly subordinate to HQJOC, and their commanders report directly to CJOPS.
