= Australian Multicultural Council =

The Australian Multicultural Council (AMC), formerly Council for Multicultural Australia (CMA), is a body appointed by the Minister for Home Affairs to advise the Australian Government on multicultural affairs, social cohesion and integration policy and programs.

== History ==
The Council for Multicultural Australia was established by the Australian Government in July 2000 for a period of three years. Its purpose was to "raise awareness and understanding" about multiculturalism. The term of the CMA was extended for an additional three years to 2006. The Howard government allowed it to lapse in that year, with the departure of its champion Arthur Sinodinos from the office of the Prime Minister.

In August 2011, the Federal Government under Prime Minister Julia Gillard, acting in accordance with the recommendations of the Australian Multicultural Advisory Council, established the Australian Multicultural Council, with the terms of reference being to provide ongoing advice on multicultural policy, social cohesion and interfaith dialogue. The membership included Rauf Soulio, as chair of the Council, Peter Wertheim, Tanveer Ahmed, and Tim Soutphommasane. and Gail Ker, deputy chair, Yassmin Abdel-Magied, Bulent Hass Dellal AM, Carmel Guerra, Samina Yasmeen, and Talal Yassine, and two ex officio members, Andrew Metcalfe, and Helen Szoke.

The council's membership was allowed to lapse from July 2014 to December 2014.

Sev Ozdowski was appointed Chair of the Australian Multicultural Council in December 2014. Other members were Helena Kyriazopoulos, deputy chair, Vasan Srinivasan, Charlotte Vidor, Faiza Rehman, Bulent Hass Dellal AM.

Former Liberal premier of Tasmania Peter Gutwein was appointed chair of the Multicultural Council in July 2026.

== Role and composition ==
The priorities of the council are listed as:

- strengthening public understanding of a shared "Australian identity" as a unifying characteristic of Australia
- harnessing the economic and social benefits of our diverse population
- advancing programs and policies aimed at building harmonious and socially cohesive communities
- promoting the importance of mutual respect and responsibility, which foster our shared Australian values, identity, and citizenship
- building stronger and more cohesive communities and addressing barriers to participation, including racism and discrimination
- promoting greater intercultural and interfaith understanding and dialogue

As of 26 March 2022, the council, whose term runs from 2022 to 2025, is known as the Australian Multicultural Council. Bulent Hass Dellal is Executive Director, and other AMC members include Nora Amath, Craig Foster AM, Helena Kyriazopoulos, Vasan Srinivasan, Anthony Sukari OAM and Jason Yeap OAM.
