= 2010 Queen's Birthday Honours (Australia) =

The Queen's Birthday Honours 2010 for Australia were announced on 13 June 2010.

† indicates an award given posthumously.

== Order of Australia ==
=== Companion (AC) ===
==== General Division ====
Recipient	Citation
Professor Dame Valerie Beral DBE	For eminent service to medicine and women's health through significant advances in cancer research and epidemiology, through seminal contributions to public health policy and as a mentor to young scientists.
The Honourable Stephen Phillip Bracks	For eminent service to the Parliament and the community of Victoria through reform of the constitutional and electoral systems, the introduction of initiatives for education and training, leadership in the promotion of multiculturalism and through economic development.
Dr Allan Douglas Hawke	For eminent service to public administration, particularly through the formulation and implementation of policy in the areas of transport, defence and education, and to the strengthening of bilateral relations with New Zealand.
Harold Charles Mitchell AO	For eminent service to the community through leadership and philanthropic endeavours in the fields of art, health and education and as a supporter of humanitarian aid in Timor-Leste and Indigenous communities.
Graeme Julian Samuel AO	For eminent service to public administration through contributions in the area of economic reform and competition law, and to the community through leadership roles with sporting and cultural organisations.

=== Officer (AO) ===
==== General Division ====
Recipient	Citation
Leonard Lyof Amadio AM	For distinguished service to the performing arts, particularly the Australian Youth Orchestra through executive, advisory and mentoring roles and through contributions to the establishment of the Alumni program.
Professor James Alexander Angus	For distinguished service to biomedical research, particularly in the fields of pharmacology and cardiovascular disease, as a leading academic and medical educator, and as a contributor to a range of advisory boards and professional organisations both nationally and internationally.
Dr Judy Cashmore	For distinguished service to the protection of children, as a research psychologist and advocate for the rights of children, through the development and implementation of social policy and law, and through leadership roles of organisations supporting child welfare.
The Honourable Justice Geoffrey Michael Giudice	For distinguished service to the judiciary and to industrial relations, particularly through the development and implementation of policies and through the Australian Industrial Relations Commission.
John Edward Harvey AM	For distinguished service to the information technology industry, particularly through developing partnerships with Government and educational institutions, and to the community.
John Leslie Langoulant	For distinguished service to business and commerce, particularly through leadership and management roles, and to the community of Western Australia.
George Lekakis	For distinguished service to the community through leadership roles in multicultural organisations, and to the development and implementation of services to support those from culturally and linguistically diverse backgrounds.
Professor Patrick Dennistoun McGorry	For distinguished service to medicine, and to mental health as a leading clinician, researcher and scientist, through innovative reform of services, the development of national programs to support youth and raising public awareness.
Professor Michael Alexander McRobbie	For distinguished service to tertiary education, particularly through administrative roles and to contributions in the field of information technology and in developing international alliances between universities.
Judith Rose Munro	For distinguished service to local government, particularly the Brisbane City Council, and to the community through contributions to business, professional development and philanthropic organisations.
Professor Gordon Barraclough Parker	For distinguished service to psychiatry as a clinician and researcher, particularly as a major contributor to the understanding and innovative treatment of mood disorders and as founder and executive director of the Black Dog Institute.
Elizabeth Mary Proust	For distinguished service to public administration and to business, through leadership roles in government and private enterprise, as a mentor to women, and to the community through contributions to arts, charitable and educational bodies.
Professor Shirley Kaye Randell AM	For distinguished service to international relations, particularly through the promotion of human rights of women and through public sector reform in developing countries.
His Honour Judge Michael Rozenes QC	For distinguished service to the judiciary, particularly as Chief Judge of the County Court of Victoria and the Commonwealth Director of Public Prosecutions, and through contributions to law reform and legal education.
The Honourable Anthony Maxwell Rundle	For distinguished service to the Parliament of Tasmania through leading law reform policy, the advancement of government services and economic development, and to the community.
Professor Vicki Rubian Sara	For distinguished service to science through contributions to research and policy development, and to higher education as Chancellor of the University of Technology, Sydney.
Professor Robert Lyndsay Sutherland	For distinguished service to medicine as an international contributor to the research of cancer, the development of Australia's research capacity and through leadership roles in advisory bodies.
His Excellency Peter Joseph Noozhumurry Varghese	For distinguished public administration, particularly in leading reform in the Australian intelligence community and as an adviser in the areas of foreign policy and international security.
The Honourable John William von Doussa	For distinguished service to the law, particularly as President of the Australian Human Rights and Equal Opportunity Commission, as a Judge through contributions to Federal and International Courts, and to higher education.
Samuel Maurice Walsh	For distinguished service to the mining industry through the development and implementation of large scale export strategies, and to the community of Western Australia, particularly through employment programs supporting Indigenous communities.
Ian James Williams	For distinguished service to the Indigenous community of Western Australia and Queensland through establishment of training programs providing sustainable employment in the mining industry, the promotion of social responsibility and as a supporter of business development initiatives.

==== Military Division ====
Branch	Recipient	Citation
Navy	Vice Admiral Matthew John Tripovich AM, CSC, RAN	For distinguished service as Head Capability Systems and Chief Capability Development Group.
Air Force	Air Marshal Mark Donald Binskin AM	For distinguished service to the Australian Defence Force in senior command and staff appointments.

=== Member (AM) ===
==== General Division ====
Recipient	Citation
Emeritus Professor Kym Llewellyn Adey	For service to university administration, to teacher education, and to a range of professional associations.
Emeritus Professor Derek John Anderson	For service to university administration, and to the botanical sciences, particularly through contributions to the development of the field of ecology in Australia.
Joseph Assaf	For service to multiculturalism, to business in the fields of marketing and communications, and to the community as a supporter of a range of charitable organisations.
Gary James Baildon	For service to local government, and to the community of the Gold Coast region, through a range of educational, sporting, health and charitable organisations.
David Harry Barnes	For service to the community, and to the disability sector, particularly through executive roles with the Multiple Sclerosis Society of Western Australia.
Professor Louise Alison Baur	For service to medicine, particularly in the field of paediatric obesity as a researcher and academic, and to the community through support for a range of children's charities.
Dr Robert Stewart Bell	For service to contemporary craft and design as a curator and advocate, and to the Art Gallery of Western Australia and the National Gallery of Australia.
Lin Bender	For service to arts administration through executive roles with a range of cultural organisations, and to the music community of Melbourne.
Jeffory Malcolm Bishop	For service to people with disabilities and their carers through the Stepping Stones for Life Project, and to the community as a contributor to a range of church and social welfare organisations.
Emeritus Professor Felix Bochner	For service to clinical pharmacology in Australia as an academic and researcher, and to a range of professional associations.
Bruce Phillip Bonyhady	For service to people with disabilities, their families and carers, particularly as Chairman of Yooralla, and to the community as a contributor to a range of charitable organisations.
Brendan Mark Bowler	For service to the welfare of the aged through executive roles with Southern Cross Care, and to the community.
John Gilbert Branson	For service to the business community of South Australia, and to education, particularly as a contributor to Flinders University.
Alfred Breznik	For service to the Slovenian community in Australia.
Robert George Brookman	For service to arts administration, particularly through executive and artistic roles with the Sydney Theatre Company, WOMADelaide, the Adelaide Festival Centre and the Adelaide Festival.
Patricia Carmel Brougham	For service to the community as a fundraiser and volunteer for a range of charities supporting children and young people with disabilities.
Ian Forbes Brown	For service to the insurance industry, and to a range of professional associations.
Arthur Byrne †	For service to business, particularly the manufacturing industry, and to the community through the Cure Cancer Australia Foundation.
Ian Gregory Carnell	For service to public administration through contributions to the development and implementation of policy in the areas of national security and counter-terrorism.
Prudence Helen Carpenter	For service to youth through the Guiding movement and the Abbotsleigh School, and to the community of Bowral.
Alison Miranda Carroll	For service to the visual arts, particularly through the development and administration of cultural exchange programs between Australia and Asia.
Paul Burgess Cave	For service to the tourism industry in New South Wales, and to the community as a supporter of a range of health, sporting and charitable organisations.
Dr Alan Nicholas Chantler	For service to computer science, particularly as a contributor to the development of security concepts and methodology, and as an educator.
Dr Herbert Edward Clifford	For service to hospital administration, and to clinical practice at the Sydney Adventist Hospital.
The Reverend Dr Ross Richard Clifford	For service to the Baptist Union of Australia, to religious education, and to the promotion of interfaith dialogue and Christian media.
Kevin John Cocks	For service to people with disabilities as an advocate for the promotion and protection of individual human rights, and as a contributor to the reform and development of disability services.
Professor Peter John Collignon	For service to medicine, particularly as a practitioner and educator in the fields of clinical microbiology, infectious diseases and infection control.
Emanuel John Comino OAM	For service to multiculturalism, particularly through continued support for the Greek community of Sydney.
Kenneth Arnold Conway	For service to the performing arts in the Northern Territory, as an administrator and as a promoter and supporter of community-based programs.
Martin Copley	For service to conservation and the environment through the preservation of Australia's native species of flora and fauna.
Douglas Keith Coughran	For service to conservation and the environment, particularly through the disentanglement of whales, as a practitioner and educator.
The Honourable Justice Linda Marion Dessau	For service to the judiciary, particularly through contributions in the area of family law policy and practice, and to the community.
Ian Millington Dicker	For service to the community of Victoria, to Australian rules football, and to business.
Andrew Edward Dix	For service to medical administration through contributions to the regulation of professional and practice standards.
Elizabeth Jane Douglass	For service to community and the arts, particularly as a charitable fundraiser for the Peter Pan Committee of Barnardos Australia and the Australian Ballet.
John Patrick Doyle	For service to the media as a presenter and entertainer, and as a supporter of a range of charitable organisations, particularly the United Nations Children's Fund in Australia.
Dr Christopher James Duncombe	For service to medicine, particularly in the fields of HIV and infectious diseases, both in Australia and the Asia-Pacific region.
Dr Jean Rosa Edwards	For service to medicine, particularly through roles supporting victims of sexual assault, and as a contributor to education and training programs.
William Thomas Emmanuel	For service to the music and entertainment industries as a guitarist, and to the community as a supporter of Kids Under Cover.
Helen Layton Ferber	For service to the community, particularly as a social policy researcher and historian, and through contributions to the advancement of women.
Douglas Anthony Formby	For service to veterans and their families, particularly through the Queensland Branch of the Returned & Services League of Australia, and to the community.
Dr Jill Mary Forrest	For service to medicine as an academic, researcher and educator, and to music as a composer and carillonist.
Professor David George Gardiner	For service to university administration at the Queensland University of Technology, to legal education, and to a range of professional associations.
Emeritus Professor Laurence Basil Geffen	For service to neuroscience as a clinician and researcher, and to medical education.
Adam Craig Gilchrist	For service to cricket as a player, and to the community as a supporter of a range of charitable organisations.
Professor Graham William Greenleaf	For service to the law through the development of free electronic access to legal information, and as a leader in the protection of privacy.
Mohini Indira Gunasekera	For service to the Sri Lankan community, to Buddhism through leadership and support of a range of organisations, and to interfaith dialogue.
Dr John Francis Gunning	For service to medicine as a cardiologist, and through senior roles with a range of professional organisations.
James Halliday	For service to the wine industry as a winemaker, show judge, author and promoter of Australian wine internationally, and through senior roles with a range of professional organisations.
Michael John Hawker	For service as a leader in the banking and finance industries, and to the community, particularly through the development of corporate mentoring programs in schools.
Lorna Rosemarie Hempstead	For service to the arts as an administrator in the fields of theatre and dance, and to the community through a range of heritage, tourism, aged care and educational institutions.
Peter Henneken	For service to the public sector in Queensland, particularly as a leader in policy development in the fields of industrial relations and vocational training.
Dianne Marian Hiles	For service to the community as an advocate for human rights and social justice, particularly for asylum seekers and children in detention.
The Honourable William Michael Hodgman	For service to politics through the Parliaments of Australia and Tasmania, and to the community through a range of ex-service, charitable, sporting and multicultural organisations.
Emeritus Professor Roderick Weir Home	For service to education as a scholar and archivist of the history and philosophy of science.
Peter John Hunt	For service to the community as a supporter of a range of charitable organisations, particularly in the fields of Indigenous education, homelessness, overseas aid and medical research.
Dr John Hurley	For service as a leader and innovator in geriatric medicine through the development of best practice and quality improvement programs in aged care.
Professor Alan Frank Isles	For service as a hospital administrator, medical educator and specialist in the field of paediatric respiratory medicine.
Emeritus Professor Lesley Ruth Johnson	For service to education as a leading academic, administrator and author, particularly in the fields of cultural history and feminist studies, and through the establishment of research centres for a range of disciplines.
Dr Nic David Jools	For service to the community through philanthropic donations of Australian art and financial support for a range of educational and medical organisations, as a benefactor to developing artists, and to medicine in the field of gynaecology.
Kevin Francis Kelly ED	For service to the administration of medicine, particularly in the field of pathology and medical research.
Maria Antonia Kenda	For service to the community as a supporter of the arts and benefactor to a range of charitable organisations.
Gordon Jeffrey Kennett	For service to engineering as an innovator in the fields of precision machining and hydraulics, and to the preservation of Australia's military heritage.
Jennice Frances Kersh	For service to the community as a supporter of a range of charitable, Indigenous and health organisations, and to the restaurant and catering industry, particularly through the use and promotion of traditional Indigenous ingredients.
Raymond Rowan Kersh	For service to the community as a supporter of a range of charitable, Indigenous and health organisations, and to the restaurant and catering industry, particularly through the use and promotion of traditional Indigenous ingredients.
Brigadier Colin Nicholas Khan DSO	For service to the community through the development of memorials commemorating the Korean and Vietnam conflicts, and as a supporter and patron of ex-service organisations.
Stephen Joseph Killelea	For service to the community through the global peace movement and the provision of humanitarian aid to the developing world.
David Desmond Knoll	For service to the Jewish community through a range of peak, religious and educational organisations, and to the promotion of interfaith dialogue.
Margaret Lobo	For service as an advocate and promoter of the status and health of women, particularly through Soroptimist International.
Emeritus Professor David Robert Lockett	For service to music as a concert pianist, educator and researcher, and as an advocate and supporter of Australian music and composers.
Sister Maryanne Loughry	For service to the community as an advocate for displaced persons and refugees.
Denis Leslie McDermott APM	For service to community policing, particularly through leadership roles in the Pacific region, and to the community through a range of charitable and humanitarian assistance organisations.
Donald Patrick McDonald	For service to community health through the Schizophrenia Research Institute of Australia, and to the union movement.
Peter John McGovern	For service to business through the finance sector, and to the community as a benefactor to a range of educational and aged care organisations.
Associate Professor Robert Anthony MacMahon	For service to medicine in the field of paediatric surgery as a clinician and academic.
Avis Lynette Macphee	For service to community health, particularly as a supporter of research into the treatment and management of breast cancer.
Professor Yiu-Wing Mai	For service to engineering, particularly in the fields of advanced composite materials and fracture research.
John William Maitland	For service to industrial relations in the mining sector as a contributor to the establishment of international health and safety standards, union structures and social dialogue in developing countries and those undergoing political and economic transition.
Professor Arumugam Manohoran	For service to medicine as a haematologist, particularly as a researcher in the field of tumours and as an educator.
Ian Wallace Mansfield CSC	For service to international humanitarian aid through the establishment of global landmine removal, safety and training programs.
Associate Professor Richard John Matthews	For service to the health sector through leadership roles in the areas of service development, primary health care, mental health, and drug and alcohol policy.
John Mawurndjul	For service to the preservation of Indigenous culture as the foremost exponent of the Rarrk visual art style.
Dr John Herbert Mickan	For service to rural medicine, particularly through contributions to research resulting in the identification and isolation of the amoebic meningitis parasite and through the Royal Flying Doctor Service of Australia.
Dr Judith Ann Mitchell	For service to humanitarian aid through leadership roles with Oxfam, particularly the development of improved governance and accountability standards.
Captain Paul Anthony Moulds	For service to homeless and disadvantaged youth through The Salvation Army.
Captain Robbin Moulds	For service to homeless and disadvantaged youth through The Salvation Army.
Professor Teik Ewe Oh	For service to medicine, particularly through the development of protocols for the specialties of anaesthesia and intensive care, through leadership roles in clinical and academic practice, and with professional bodies.
Dr Trevor Ernest Olsen	For service to medicine as a clinical haematologist, and as an advocate for advances in the management and treatment of leukaemia.
Dr John Raymond Owen	For service to the specialty of orthodontics, and through a range of leadership roles within the dental profession.
The Honourable Justice George Alfred Palmer QC	For service to the law as a judge of the Supreme Court of New South Wales, and to music as a composer and through leadership roles with a range of cultural bodies.
Peggy Dirrmingali Patrick	For service to the arts as a performer, artist and storyteller, to the preservation of the culture and history of the Gija people of the East Kimberley region, and to reconciliation.
Joan Elizabeth Payne	For service to the protection and conservation of wetland bird species and the urban bushland environment in Western Australia.
Annette Elizabeth Peardon	For service to the community, particularly as a reconciliation and human rights advocate, and to the Indigenous community of Cape Barren Island.
Warren Andrew Pearson	For service to the community through leadership roles with the National Australia Day Council, to the promotion of the celebration of the Australian identity and citizenship, and to reconciliation.
Carol Gwendoline Peltola †	For service to the community, particularly through the development of child protection policies, and to the provision of services to improve the rights of people with disabilities, drug addiction and mental health issues.
Dr Andrew Graham Penman	For service to public health through leadership roles with the Cancer Council of New South Wales, to the development of research funding initiatives, and to improved service delivery and support for people with cancer.
Dr Haydn Perndt	For service to medicine, particularly in the field of anaesthesia, to medical education through the design and implementation of training programs for health care practitioners in developing countries, and to professional organisations.
Dr Gabrielle Josephine Persley	For service to science through advisory roles with a range of national and international agricultural research organisations, and through support for the development of livestock health, particularly in Africa.
Greig Pickhaver	For service to the media as a presenter and entertainer, as an author, and as a supporter of the United Nations Children's Fund in Australia.
Professor Barbara Ann Pocock	For service to industrial relations as an academic and researcher, particularly in the areas of employment, gender relations and vocational education, and as an advocate for social justice.
The Honourable Justice Derek Michael Price	For service to the law and to the judiciary, to the development and delivery of justice initiatives for the Indigenous community, children and young persons, and through contributions to legal organisations.
Edward Andrew Quinlan	For service to the Australian Capital Territory Legislative Assembly through a range of roles, and to the community.
Lester Campbell Rathie	For service to business, particularly through the oil and gas production and exploration industry in the Northern Territory.
Professor Geoffrey John Riley	For service to medical education, particularly to rural and clinical practice, as an academic and administrator, and to professional organisations.
Dr James Robertson PSM	Fr service to forensic science and education, particularly in the formation of the National Centre for Forensic Studies, through the development of research, teaching and training programs with the Australian Federal Police, as an academic, and to professional organisations.
Dr Jeanette Robin Rosen	For service to medicine, particularly in the field of audiology, to people with a hearing disability, and through contributions to the Self Help for Hard of Hearing People organisation.
Andrew George Sayers	For service to arts administration, particularly as the Director of the National Portrait Gallery, and to the promotion of Australian portraiture.
Helen Margaret Sewell	For service to the community through philanthropic contributions to, and executive roles with, organisations assisting young people with cancer, and to medical research groups.
Dr Peter Gordon Sharp	For service to medicine in the field of Indigenous health, particularly through clinical, teaching and administrative roles with the Winnunga Nimmityjah Aboriginal Health Service.
Dr Gene Rosalie Sherman	For service to the visual arts through advisory roles and as a supporter of new and established artists, and to the community through philanthropic contributions to a range of organisations.
Dr Robert John Solomon	For service to urban affairs, particularly through research, public discussion and policy development by the Australian Institute of Urban Studies, to the Association of Former Members of Parliament, and to athletics.
The Honourable Chhay Son	For service to international relations, and to the community through the Cambodian-Australian Association of South Australia.
James Gerard Soorley	For service to local government and to the City of Brisbane, particularly as Lord Mayor and through the implementation of a range of cultural, urban design, transportation and waterway improvement projects.
Ian Frederick Stanwell RFD, ED	For service to business, particularly the insurance industry, through executive roles with a range of organisations, to professional development, and to ex-service, youth and aged care groups.
Associate Professor John Michael Svigos	For service to medicine, particularly in the field of obstetrics and perinatology, through executive roles with national and international professional organisations, and to medical education.
Dr John William Tapsall	For service to medicine and to public health microbiology, particularly through contributions to the understanding of gonococcal and meningococcal disease.
Valerie May Taylor	For service to conservation and the environment as an advocate for the protection and preservation of marine wildlife and habitats, particularly the Great Barrier Reef and Ningaloo Reef, and as an underwater cinematographer and photographer.
The Honourable Ian David Thompson †	For service to the Parliament of Western Australia, and through contributions to a variety of sporting organisations.
Dr Christine Trevella Tippett	For service to medicine, particularly through executive roles with professional organisations, to improved health care standards for women and their families, and to obstetrics and gynaecology as a clinician and mentor.
Michael William Traill	For service to not-for-profit organisations through the development and implementation of effective financial systems and mentoring, and as a facilitator for social change.
Robert John Trenberth	For service to business, particularly through advisory roles for emerging manufacturing and research enterprises, to a range of not-for-profit organisations, and to youth.
Angela Louise Valamanesh	For service to the visual arts as a ceramicist and sculptor.
Hossein Valamanesh	For service to the visual arts, particularly as a sculptor and through installation works and public art.
Dr Ingrid Alida van Beek	For service to public health and community medicine through the promotion and provision of primary care for people affected by mental health issues, substance and physical abuse, and HIV/AIDS, and to medical education.
Dr Nitin Verma	For service to ophthalmology through executive roles with professional organisations, as a clinician and researcher, and to humanitarian health care projects in the Pacific region.
Dr Joanna Wainer	For service to the community as an academic and researcher in the area of women's reproductive health rights, and through leadership roles promoting women in medicine, particularly in rural and remote areas.
Dr Ronald Gary Weiser	For service to the community through leadership roles with the Zionist Federation of Australia, to the promotion and development of Australia-Israel relations, and to youth.
Dr Saul Wiener	For service to science, and to medical research through contributions to the development of the Redback spider and Stonefish antivenom, and as an allergist.
Dr Vernon Roger Wilkinson	For service to the secondary and tertiary education sectors, particularly as an administrator, researcher and mentor, to professional associations, and to the community.
Emeritus Professor Ross Alan Williams	For service to education, particularly in the discipline of econometrics, through research and administrative roles, as a contributor to professional publications, and as an adviser to state and Federal governments.
Dr William James Winspear	For service to dentistry, particularly in the area of public dental health policy, to the promotion of professional standards and ethics, and to the community.
Dr Alexander David Wodak	For service to medicine and public health, particularly in the area of drug and alcohol dependency treatment, through legislative reform, and to medical education.
Dr Lindsay Ian Worthley	For service to medical education, particularly in the area of intensive care medicine, as a clinician, mentor and educator, and through contributions to professional associations.
The Reverend Canon Michael Gumbuli Wurramara	For service to the Anglican Church of Australia through a range of pastoral care and advisory roles, as a supporter of the production of the Kriol Bible, and to the community of Ngukurr.
Mike Zafiropoulos	For service to the community through executive roles with a range of arts, multicultural, charitable, media and local government organisations, and as an advocate for cultural diversity and harmony.

==== Military Division ====
Branch	Recipient	Citation
Navy	Commodore Bronko Stanley Ogrizek RAN	For exceptional service in the field of naval engineering and safety.
Navy	Captain Philip Andrew Warwick RAN	For exceptional service and contribution to Navy logistics as Chief Staff Officer – Support and Director Logistic Support Agency – Navy.
Army	Colonel Michael Charles Batiste	For exceptional service to the Australian Army in the field of logistics between 2004 and 2009.
Army	Brigadier Paul Le Gay Brereton RFD	For exceptional service to the Australian Army as the Chief of Staff Headquarters 5th Brigade, Assistant Chief of Staff, Land Headquarters and as Commander 5th Brigade.
Army	Lieutenant Colonel Robert Douglas Cooper	For exceptional service over the last 25 years to the Australian Defence Force as a scientific officer specialising in medical entomology.
Army	Colonel Robert Bruce Crowe	For exceptional service in the sustainment of Army Aviation operations.
Army	Brigadier Michael George Krause	For exceptional service as the Head of Recruitment and Retention Implementation Staff throughout 2007 and as the Commander of the 1st Brigade during 2008 and 2009.
Army	Colonel Gavan John Reynolds	For exceptional service to the Australian Army in the fields of intelligence and career management, particularly as the Commanding Officer of the 1st Intelligence Battalion, the Director of Officer Career Management – Army and the Commander Career Management – Army.
Army	Lieutenant Colonel Paul Anthony Robards	For exceptional service to the Australian Army and the Australian Defence Force in the field of workforce modelling, forecasting and analysis.
Army	Brigadier Steven Lyndon Smith CSC, RFD	For exceptional service as the Commander Joint Headquarters Transition Team Iraq, Assistant Commander of the 1st Division and Commander 9th Brigade.

=== Medal (OAM) ===
==== General Division ====
Recipient	Citation
Dr Colin Richard Abery	For service to the community through contributions to the advocacy and promotion of bowel cancer screening programs.
Professor Margaret Mary Alston	For service to the community, particularly in the field of social work as an academic, researcher and practitioner, and to women in rural areas.
Laurance Maxwell Amber	For service to local government, and to the community of Campbelltown.
Dr Sadanand Nagesharao Anavekar	For service to medicine, and to the Indian community of Victoria.
Robert Harvey Anderson	For service to conservation and the environment, particularly through Friends of the Helmeted Honeyeater.
Dr Robert Scott Anderssen	For service to mathematical and information sciences.
Maurice Ray Andrews	For service to the sport of shooting through a range of administrative roles.
Allan Ernest Arbon	For service to local government, and to the community of Murray Bridge.
Helene May Armour	For service to the fruit growing industry, and to local government.
Mamdouh Atalla	For service to multiculturalism, particularly the Sudanese community.
Maria Carmel Attard-Dickson	For service to the community through a range of social welfare organisations.
Jeffrey John Austin RFD	For service to water management and conservation, and to the community.
Kay Avery	For service to the community of Kilcoy through a range of social welfare, church and aged care organisations.
Dr Ian Kenneth Bailey	For service to medicine as a cardiologist.
William Thomas Baird	For service to the community of Hay.
Barry William Barnes	For service to basketball as a player, coach, and mentor.
Dr Frederick Hugh Bartholomeusz RFD	For service to medicine in the field of reconstructive surgery, and to medical administration.
Robyn Catherine Beddsion	For service to the community through fundraising for the Epworth Medical Foundation.
Alexander George Bedwell	For service to the community of the Bathurst region.
Jean Margaret Bell	For service to the community, particularly to the Australian Red Cross.
Dr Onn Ben-David	For service to veterinary science and animal welfare, particularly through the Royal Society for the Prevention of Cruelty to Animals, Victoria.
Albert John Benfer	For service to the chicken meat industry, and to the community of Redland Shire.
Sandra Rosalie Benjamin	For service to the community, particularly through the Jewish Museum of Australia, and to the arts.
Diane Kay Bennett	For service to the community, particularly through the Clarence Town Rural Fire Brigade.
Peter Bennison	For service to the Parliament of Tasmania, and to the community.
Ronald William Beslich	For service to the building industry, and to the community.
Marika Bisas	For service to the Greek community of Victoria.
Peta Sheridan Blyth	For service to the performing arts, particularly opera.
Graham Gatenby Bolton	For service to the hospitality and tourism industry through a range of executive roles.
Michael James Bouffard	For service to the community of the Huon Valley, and to education.
Lawrence Joseph Bourke	For service to veterans through the Dee Why Sub-Branch of the Returned & Services League of Australia.
Lovely Ruth Boveington	For service to international humanitarian aid projects.
Jean Boyd	For service to the community of Ulverstone.
Robert Charles Boyd	For service to the community of Ulverstone.
Sandra Anne Breen	For service to the performing arts, particularly dance, as a teacher and choreographer.
Eric William Brewer	For service to local government, and to the community.
Doris Mary Brooker	For service to the community through voluntary roles with the Country Women's Association and the Australian Red Cross.
Beverley Alice Brown	For service to the arts, particularly through the Friends of the Australian Ballet (South Australia).
Dorothy Evelyn Brown	For service to swimming.
William Anthony Buckley	For service to education, and as a mentor to Indigenous students.
Neville Raymond Burrows	For service to the community through philanthropic contributions to a range of charitable, youth, disabled and service organisations.
Patricia Mara Byrne	For service to people with disabilities, and to the community.
Professor Desmond Philip Cahill	For service to intercultural education, and to the interfaith movement.
Professor Joseph Anthony Camilleri	For service to international relations as a scholar, educator and commentator, and to the community.
Arthur Alexander Campbell	For service to the Kiama–Gerringong community through local government, church and ex-service organisations.
William Harry Campbell	For service to children and young people, particularly through the provision of crisis accommodation.
Leon Charles Capra	For service to education as Foundation Principal of St Augustine's College, Springfield.
Diana Mary Carmody	For service to the community, particularly through the provision of support for children undergoing liver and renal treatment, and their families.
Dianne Joy Carroll	For service to the community of the Omeo district, particularly through roles with historical and heritage organisations.
Margaret Therese Catterall	For service to education as a teacher-librarian, particularly through the development of educational programs and partnerships with schools in Asia.
Jill Susan Chamberlain	For service to wildlife preservation and conservation in Queensland, and to the community.
Dr Roland George Chambers	For service to medicine as a general practitioner.
Kevin Douglas Cifuentes	For service to judo as an instructor and competitor.
Valmai Gladys Cleary	For service to the community of Robinvale, particularly through the provision of medical care services.
Carin Lydia Clonda	For service to squash through administrative roles, and to the community.
David Neville Cohen	For service to the community through the provision of voluntary accountancy services to a range of organisations.
Michael Sydney Cohen	For service to the community through a range of Jewish organisations.
Peter John Cole	For service to the international community through the Spirit of Sharing mission.
The Reverend Dr Garrett John Coleman	For service to the community through chaplaincy and coordination roles with the Motor Racing Ministries.
Frederick John Cook	For service to conservation and the environment through the Friends of the Bellarine Rail Trail.
Gary Thomas Cooper	For service to the trade union movement, and to the community of Whitehorse.
Robert Brian Cooper	For service to veterans and their families through the Rooty Hill Sub-Branch of the Returned & Services League of Australia.
Brian Maurice Coopersmith	For service to the community of Maroondah, particularly through sporting organisations.
Peter Geoffrey Corlett	For service to the visual arts as a sculptor.
Peter Cornell	For service to the community through philanthropic contributions to a range of charitable organisations.
Joan Cornett	For service to the community, particularly through the Bribie-Morton Hospice Health Services.
Hazel Betty Costigan	For service to people with intellectual disabilities through the Activ Foundation.
Merril Elizabeth Coulton BM	For service to the community through volunteer roles at St Vincent's Private Hospital.
Julie Frances Creed	For service to youth through the Scouting movement.
Patricia Margaret Creevey	For service to local government, and to the community of Mandurah.
Dr John Royston Crellin	For service to medicine as an administrator and practitioner, and to the community of Wonthaggi.
Geoffrey Alan Crick	For service to primary industry through a range of roles with the National Farmers Federation.
Victor Crittenden	For service to the arts as a researcher, author and publisher, particularly through the biographical and literary study of the Australian colonial period.
Pamela Milba Crocker	For service to the community of Tumut.
Dr Zissis Tsiaousis Dardalis	For service to the Australian-Greek community, particularly through charitable contributions to a range of education, health care and sporting organisations.
Dougal Burns Davidson	For service to local government, and to the community of the Blackall–Tambo region.
Evelyn Annie Davies	For service to the community, particularly to the Babinda State Emergency Service.
Ronald Day	For service to the community, particularly through the Rotary Club of Aspley.
Robert Walter Devenish †	For service to the inmates and their families as a chaplain, and to the community.
Donald Allen Dickenson	For service to the community through the Rotary Club of Scottsdale, and to the building industry.
John Dixon Hughes	For service to medicine, particularly through advisory roles with a range of research, transport and health care delivery organisations.
John Mark Dnistriansky	For service to the Ukrainian community of South Australia.
Dr Paul Francis Donaghue	For service to science, particularly through technological research and development roles, and to professional organisations.
Christine Graham Doran	For service to the community as a fundraiser for organisations assisting people with Cystic Fibrosis.
Faye Ainsworth Druett	For service to the community, particularly through executive and advocacy roles with organisations assisting people with a disability.
Walter Henry Eastman	For service to the performing arts, and to the community.
Shirley Anne Eckford	For service to the community of central Queensland, particularly through contributions to the School of Distance Education.
Dr Donald Ernest Edgar	For service to education as a researcher and teacher, and through the Australian Institute of Family Studies.
Dorothy Lilian Edgelow	For service to community health, particularly through the Gawler Foundation.
Kathleen Edwards	For service to youth through the Young Women's Christian Association.
Thomas Haddon Edwards	For service to the community of Ipswich, and to business.
Anastasios Efkarpidis	For service to business through the retail and construction sectors.
Janelle Eldridge	For service to athletics.
Emeritus Professor John Elkins	For service to education, and to people with learning disabilities.
Sandy Evans	For service to Australian contemporary jazz music as a composer and musician.
Martin Anthony Farrell †	For service to the community of Tumut through service and sporting organisations.
Carmelo Vincent Farrugia	For service to veterans and their families through the Maltese Sub-Branch of the Returned & Services League of Australia, and to the community.
Robert Hugh Ferguson	For service to veterans and their families through the Upwey–Belgrave Sub-Branch of the Returned & Services League of Australia.
Beryl Irene Fillery	For service to the community of the Canberra region as a volunteer with a range of social welfare organisations.
John Thomas Fillery	For service to the community of the Canberra region as a volunteer with a range of social welfare organisations.
Edward George Fletcher	For service to the community through voluntary roles with ex-service and historical organisations.
John Robert Flood	For service to the community through the 3rd Cavalry Regiment (Vietnam) Association of Australia.
Elizabeth Foote	For service to the community of the Hunter Valley.
Irene Frangioudakis	For service to the Greek community of Victoria.
John Morris Franklyn	For service to the real estate industry in Western Australia, and to the community.
Ronald George Franks	For service to the community of the Hawks Nest region through a range of voluntary roles.
Ivan Bernard Friske	For service to veterans and their families, particularly through the Gympie Sub-Branch of the Returned & Services League of Australia.
Sister Teresa Josephine Geraghty	For service to aged welfare, and to charitable organisations.
Dr Patrick Charles Giltrap	For service to medicine as a general practitioner, and to the community of Gilgandra.
Keron Patrick Glendon	For service to veterans and their families in the Townsville region.
Jonah Goldman	For service to the community, particularly through the Brisbane Hebrew Congregation.
Philip John Grano	For service to people with disabilities through advocacy organisations, and to the law.
Beverley Campbell Grant	For service to the community through youth and social welfare organisations.
Mary Grant	For service to the community through a range of youth, health care support and travel organisations.
Judith Claire Gray	For service to the community through music, sporting and emergency service organisations.
Gillian Margaret Greenhill	For service to the community of the Wynnum region through historical, environmental and service groups.
Howard Brian Grigor	For service to the community through Rotary Australia.
Joan Margaret Grimmond	For service to the community of Burnie.
Lieutenant Commander Henry Albert Hall MBE	For service to veterans and their families through the Nowra–Greenwell Point Sub-Branch of the Returned & Services League of Australia.
Esther Dawn Halliday	For service to the community of Tamworth, and to local government.
Gregory John Hammond	For service to sport, particularly through achievements as a Paralympian.
Louis John Hamon	For service to the community of Numurkah.
Dr Anthony John Hanks	For service to optometry, and to the community of Port Macquarie.
Joan Hanna	For service to music, particularly through Sing Australia Shepparton.
The Very Reverend Dr Allan Macdonald Harman RFD	For service to the Presbyterian Church of Australia.
Henry Ernest Harman	For service to the performing arts as a jazz musician and as a mentor of emerging artists.
Richard Michael Harrold	For service to the community of Tasmania through a range of charitable and sporting organisations.
Darcy Lloyd Harvey	For service to the sport of sailing.
Samir Sam Hasic	For service to multicultural broadcasting, and to the Bosnia-Herzegovina Muslim Society of South Australia.
Sally Anne Hasluck	For service to museum administration in Western Australia and as a Councillor of the National Museum.
Lorraine Gay Hawksworth	For service to industrial relations, particularly through the Queensland Nurses' Union of Employees.
Janet Huntly de Gray Hay	For service to the community through the National Trust of Australia, New South Wales.
Noel Fortune Henry	For service to the community, particularly through the Rotary Club of Rosanna.
Pastor Ernst Bernhardt Heyne	For service to the Lutheran Church of Australia, and to the community of Port Pirie.
Helen Violet Hill	For service to the community through the Presbyterian Women's Association of New South Wales.
Helga Margarete Hill	For service to the performing arts.
Dorothy Jean Hoare	For service to youth, and to the community of Trafalgar.
Peter Raymond Hobart	For service to education, and to the community of the Gold Coast.
Margaret Hodgson	For service to the arts as an author and illustrator.
Ivan Charles Hoffman	For service to the arts as a supporter and fundraiser.
Mollie Drage Holst	For service to veterans and their families as a voluntary carer of war graves of World War II Australian airmen in Norway, and through the organisation of Anzac Day services.
Vivien Suit-cheng Hope	For service to multiculturalism, and to the community of South Australia.
George Brook Howe	For service to the performing arts as a carillonist.
Lola Joyce Hurst	For service to the community of Moree.
Yvonne Royale Hyde	For service to the community through the Nutcote Trust and the May Gibbs Foundation.
Ruth Jula Inall	For service to aged care through the Australian Association of Gerontology.
Brigadier Olof Hedley Isaksson MC	For service to veterans through the Rats of Tobruk Association, New South Wales.
Sarah Helen Ison	For service to youth through The Girls and Boys Brigade.
Beryl Joy Jacobs	For service to the community of Tumut through volunteer roles with a range of organisations.
Alan Campbell Johnson	For service to lawn bowls.
Rita Johnson	For service to the Latvian community in Western Australia.
Peter John Johnstone	For service to local government, and to Jesuit Social Services.
Anne Jones	For service to community health through roles with Action on Smoking and Health Australia.
Michael Angelo Kakulas	For service to the community of Perth through the Cathedral of Saints Constantine and Helene.
William Kane	For service to veterans through the Australian Federation of Totally and Permanently Incapacitated Ex-Service Men and Women (TPI Federation).
William Allan Kearney	For service to the communities of the Wide Bay-Burnett districts, particularly veterans and their families.
Maxwell Walter Kelleher	For service to people with disabilities through Wheelchair Sports Victoria, and to the Australian Football League.
Gail Kathleen Ker	For service to the multicultural community of Queensland.
John Alexander King	For service to surf lifesaving, and to the community of Western Australia.
Walter Lawrence Klau	For service to conservation and the environment through the Australian Bird and Bat Banding Scheme.
Wouterina Gode Liva Klein	For service to local government, and to the community of Bassendean.
Elizabeth Aileen Krake	For service to the community of Red Cliffs and Sunraysia.
Alan Wilfred Langford	For service to swimming.
Anthony Thomas Lantry	For service to education, and to the New South Wales Schools Cricket Association.
Audrey Florence Ledwich	For service to the community through the Ecumenical Refugee Support Group.
David Douglas Lee	For service to the community, particularly through the Royal Association of Justices of South Australia.
Michael John Lee	For service to aged care, and to tennis.
Noel Solomon Levin	For service to the Jewish community, particularly the St Kilda Hebrew Congregation, and to people with disabilities through the Riding for the Disabled Association of Victoria.
Abraham Jerome Levy	For service to the Australian film industry through the Waterside Workers' Federation Film Unit and as a producer, director and actor.
Mary Elwyn Lewis	For service to the community of the City of Greater Geelong.
Chuen Ren Lim	For service to business, and to the Chinese community of Victoria.
Ambrose Niel Linke	For service to the community through the Western Schools Chaplaincy Support Association.
Betty Mary Linton	For service to the community through the Sir William Dobell Memorial Committee.
Jocelyn William Littler	For service to the community of Devonport.
David Norman Loader	For service to education as a Principal, mentor and author.
Barry Joseph McCann	For service to maritime communications in Tasmania.
Ian Robert McCauley	For service to the mining industry.
Raymond Patrick McCormack	For service to the community of Launceston through a range of social welfare and sporting organisations.
Julie Ann McGinley	For service to swimming.
Dr Margaret Anna McMillan	For service to medical education, particularly nursing, through a range of academic and executive roles.
Robert Ian McMillan	For service to the community through a range of charitable organisations.
Desmond Patrick McRae	For service to the community of Jerilderie.
Joyce Mona Mallett	For service to the arts through the Friends of the South Australian Museum.
John Gerard Manion	For service to the community through cancer support and hospice service programs.
Adib Marabani	For service to the Lebanese community of New South Wales.
John Marshall	For service to the building and construction industry.
Ernest John Martin	For service to veterans in South Australia.
Florence Edith Matthews	For service to the community of Norwood, Payneham and St Peters, particularly as a library volunteer.
Michael Meehan †	For service to young persons with a disability, particularly through Special Kids Queensland, and to the veteran community.
Genevieve Catherine Meyer	For service to children as a foster carer.
Kees Anthony Meyer	For service to children as a foster carer.
Robyn Lynette Miller	For service to youth through the Guiding movement.
Tony Miller	For service to the community through the provision of support services for separate families.
David Walter Milligan	For service to veterans and their families, and to the community through the Adelaide Highland Pipe Band.
Paolo Mirabella	For service to business, and to the Italian community of Victoria.
Alexander Harvey-George Moncrieff	For service to children through the Pedal Prix Program.
Associate Professor Harry George Mond	For service to medicine in the field of cardiology.
Doris May Moore	For service to the community of Townsville, and to youth through the Guiding movement.
Neil William Morarty	For service to surf lifesaving through a range of executive roles.
John Morgan	For service to people with disabilities through the Spastic Centre of New South Wales.
Lewis Frederick Morley	For service to the visual arts as a photographer.
Jennifer Roy Muir	For service to women, and to education through the provision of library services.
Charles William Munnery	For service to veterans and their families, and to the community.
Catherine Therese Murray	For service to people with disabilities, and to their carers and families.
The Reverend Douglas Harry Murray PSM	For service to the Anglican Church in Australia, and to the community of Esperance.
Ian Wallace Murray	For service to the community through a range of roles with sporting, social welfare and health care organisations.
Lerryn William Mutton	For service to the communities of Concord and Kincumber.
Wayne Morris Myers	For service to youth through the Scouting movement.
Dr Peter James Mylrea	For service to the community, particularly through the Camden Historical Society.
Constantinos Nikias	For service to the community of the Australian Capital Territory.
Richard Harwin Nossiter DSC	For service to sailing through the circumnavigation of the globe in the vessel Sirius, 1935–1937.
Dr William Terrance O'Brien	For service to the maritime transport industry.
Dr Richard John O'Bryan	For service to the community of St Kilda, particularly as a general practitioner.
David William Omant	For service to Australian rules football, and to people with a disability.
Gwenllyn Daisy Parry-Jones	For service to conservation and the environment, particularly through the Wambina Flying Fox Education and Research Centre.
Jean Lois Pearce †	For service to the community through philanthropic contributions to a range of educational, aged care and medical organisations.
Phyllis Marjorie Pearson	For service to music, and to the community of the Nambucca region.
Brian Gilbert Pell	For service to conservation and the environment, and to the City of Whitehorse.
Virginia Eve Peoples	For service to the community of the Sutherland Shire.
Regina Lillian Perton	For service to administrative law and to the community, particularly in the areas of equal opportunity and multiculturalism.
Peter Melville Phillips	For service to the community of Ipswich through a range of education, conservation and social welfare organisations.
Margarette Danielsen Powell	For service to the community, particularly through the Reynella Historical Committee.
Marleen Glenice Pratt	For service to Australian floral art, particularly through a range of executive roles.
Shirley Doris Pring	For service to people with a disability.
The Reverend Dr Douglas John Purnell	For service to the Uniting Church in Australia, and to the community.
Mahboba Rawi	For service to international humanitarian aid in Afghanistan.
Philip Ivan Rees	For service to music through the Central Coast Philharmonia Choir.
Nancy Dawn Reid	For service to people with a visual impairment through Guide Dogs Victoria, and to the community.
Noel James Reid	For service to the community of the Queanbeyan area through church and social welfare organisations.
Trevor Vern Reid	For service to the community through the Brass Band movement.
Kevin Lawrence Richards	For service to the community of St Helens, and to sporting organisations.
Janice Mary Rickards	For service to the library and information sciences, and to education.
Lorna Jane Rickert	For service to the community of Nobby, and to the Sister Kenny Memorial Fund.
Edwina Anne Ridgway	For service to the community, particularly through the University of New England.
Jon Riordan	For service to young people through volunteer and fundraising roles with Variety, the Children's Charity.
Barbara Claire Rix	For service to people with a disability, particularly through the Amelia Rix Foundation and Awards.
Mark Lane Robertson	For service to the community through executive roles with charitable organisations, and to the hospitality sector.
Vernon Robinson	For service to the community of Geelong.
Pauline Rockman	For service to the community, particularly through the Jewish Holocaust Centre.
Robert Barton Rogers	For service to the media as a radio broadcaster.
Geoffrey Kenneth Rohr	For service to the rural communities of Tooraweenah, Gilgandra and Coonabarabran.
Dr Kenneth Norman Ross	For service to educational planning through a range of technical and project management roles.
James Steenson Rush	For service to the community through a range of social welfare organisations.
John Sydney Ryan	For service to sport in Western Australia.
Roderic Leslie Saal	For service to primary industry, and to the rural community of Queensland.
Dr Luis Sánchez-Cuñat	For service to education, and to Iberian and Latin American studies.
Ian Charles Sauer	For service to natural resource management in Tasmania, particularly through Landcare.
Judith Elizabeth Scarrott	For service to the community of the Bendigo region.
Conrad John Schlenk	For service to the Lutheran Church of Australia, and to the community.
Elsie Myra Seguss	For service to the performing arts as a teacher of dance.
Jessie Catherine Serle	For service to heritage conservation as an author and advocate and through advisory roles for the preservation and restoration of historic properties.
Nichole Sexton	For service to the community of Exmouth.
Brian Marshall Sharp	For service to local government, and to the community of the Murray Shire.
Anabel Viva Shears Carter	For service to the wine industry, and to education.
Ethel May Shippen	For service to literature through the Society of Women Writers, South Australia.
Raymond George Singer	For service to the community of Robina.
Toula Singer	For service to the community of Robina.
Michael Desmond Sinnott	For service to the community of the Maffra region, particularly through the fire and emergency management sector.
Edgar Eli Small	For service to pharmacy, and to the community.
John William Small	For service to business and commerce, particularly through professional defence sector organisations.
Brian Herbert Smith	For service to the community of the Rockhampton region.
Christopher Robin Smith	For service to the community of Rockhampton.
Denis Lynn Smith	For service to the community, particularly through the Lane Cove Historical Society.
June Evelyn Smith	For service to the community of Manly through a range of social welfare organisations.
Rex Smith	For service to local government, and to the community of the Roma region.
Trevor Donald Smith RFD	For service to youth through the Australian Army Cadets, and to charitable organisations in the Northern Territory.
Wayne William Smith	For service to youth, particularly through the Australian Navy Cadets.
Barry Smorgon	For service to the community, particularly through Maccabi Australia, and to business.
James Edward Sprice	For service to veterans and their families through the Liverpool Sub-Branch of the Returned & Services League of Australia.
Duncan Alexander Stewart	For service to the community of Yeppoon, and to pharmacy.
Edna Dorothy Stewart	For service to the community through volunteer roles with social welfare and women's organisations.
Alan Storr	For service to the community through the research and documentation of World War II RAAF service personnel.
John Straskye	For service to the community, particularly through the Royal Australian Army Medical Corps Association.
Dr William Charles Summerfield	For service to education, particularly in the field of mathematics.
Warwick Blair Tainton	For service to the community through the preservation of Australia's aviation and outback history.
Barbara Lesley Thomas	For service to the community, and through volunteer roles with the Cancer Council of Victoria.
Joyce Gordon Thomas	For service to veterans through the Returned Ex-Servicewomen's Sub-Branch of the Returned & Services League of Australia.
Hiskelina Thorpe	For service to international humanitarian aid through the provision of volunteer nursing services in developing countries.
Cheryl Elizabeth Threadgold	For service to the performing arts, particularly through the Mordialloc Light Opera Company, and to the community.
Raymond Todd	For service to philately.
Neville Robert Tomkins	For service to the community, particularly through leadership roles in the Scouting movement.
Patricia Faye Toop	For service to the community of Williamstown through heritage, maritime and social welfare organisations.
Wendy Anne Thorr	For service to people with a disability through the Riding for the Disabled Association, New South Wales
Janet Anne Trengove	For service to the Uniting Church in Australia, and to the community.
Tevita Hala Tupou	For service to the Uniting Church in Australia, and to the community of Yirrkala Dhanbul.
Lynne Uptin	For service to arts administration in Tasmania.
Ivan Visontay	For service to the community, particularly through the Courage to Care program of B'nai B'rith Australia.
Colleen Patricia Wadley	For service to the community of Homebush–Strathfield.
Leigh David Wallace	For service to the community, particularly through the Lord Mayor's Charitable Foundation.
Rupert William Wallace	For service to aged persons, and to the community.
Thomas Graham Wallace	For service to the community, particularly through the provision of pro-bono financial services for a range of organisations.
Noel Robert Waters	For service to music as an administrator, and to the community.
Malcolm Reginald Webster	For service to the community through charitable and ex-service organisations.
Robert John Webster	For service to cricket, particularly in the Shoalhaven area.
Wallace Frederick Webster	For service to the community of Wentworthville, particularly through a range of sporting organisations.
Morris John White	For service to people with a hearing impairment, and to the community of the Australian Capital Territory.
Richard Whittingham White	For service to the community, particularly through the Australian Rotary Health Research Fund.
Lynette Anne Whittingham	For service to people with a disability through a range of health care, educational, advisory and leadership roles.
Thusnelda Williams	For service to conservation and the environment, particularly through the Lansdowne Nature Reserve.
Trevor Williams	For service to volleyball.
Lieutenant Colonel Owen Charles Winter RFD ED	For service to veterans, particularly through the Royal Australian Signals Association (Tasmania).
Cecily Mary Wood	For service to music, and to the Society of Recorder Players of South Australia.
Leonard Gordon Woodley	For service to the community, and to the book industry.
Harvey Ross Worth	For service to aged care, and to the community of Bankstown.
Gwendoline Louise Wright †	For service to aged persons in the Kiama area, and to the community.
Vivian Parker Wright	For service to aged persons in the Kiama area, and to the community.
Heather Ida Yarker	For service to the community, particularly through Rotary International.
Jason S. L. Yeap	For service to the arts, particularly through the National Gallery of Victoria, and to the community.
Dr Arthur John Yencken	For service to science, particularly in the research and development fields, and to agri-business.
Dr Peter Tiong-Yong Yeoh	For service to business, particularly through the Australian-Chinese Chamber of Commerce, and to the community of Queensland.
Wilson Younan	For service to the Assyrian community in Australia, particularly as a broadcaster and journalist.
John Selwyn Young	For service to the community through roles with a range of charitable organisations.
Valerie Beatrice Zwart	For service to the community of Mapleton, and to horticulture.

==== Military Division ====
Branch	Recipient	Citation
Navy	Lieutenant Commander Murray Victor McAuliffe	For meritorious service as the First Lieutenant HMAS Cerberus and as a senior cook in the Royal Australian Navy.
Navy	Chief Petty Officer Dean Allan Medlen	For meritorious service in the field of Combat Systems Maintenance Management in Adelaide Class Frigates.
Army	Warrant Officer Class One Gregory Edmond Barron	For meritorious service as the Regimental Sergeant Major of two Force Support Battalions, Force Logistic Asset Five and Queensland University Regiment.
Army	Warrant Officer Class One K—	For meritorious service as the Regimental Operations Warrant Officer, Squadron Sergeant Major of B Squadron and the Regimental Sergeant Major of the Incident Response Regiment.
Army	Captain Andrew Stephen Norrell	For meritorious performance in the field of Australian Army logistics.
Army	Major Robert John Sutton	For meritorious service to the Australian Army in the field of Supply Chain Management.
Army	Warrant Officer Class One Scott John Wasson	For meritorious service as the Regimental Sergeant Major of the 5th/6th Battalion, The Royal Victorian Regiment and the 2nd Battalion, The Royal Australian Regiment.
Air Force	Squadron Leader Bradley John Clarke	For meritorious service to the Royal Australian Air Force in the development and management of Air Logistics Support and Airborne operations.
Air Force	Wing Commander Lindley James Ghee	For meritorious service in the field of Boeing 707 aircraft air-to-air refuelling operations.
Air Force	Flight Sergeant Bradley Lance Pitcher	For meritorious performance of duties as a Divisional Senior Non-Commissioned Officer and Squadron Sergeant Major at the Australian Defence Force Academy.
Air Force	Warrant Officer David Edward Tuite	For meritorious service as Unit Quality Manager at Number 78 Squadron and as Warrant Officer Engineering at Number 3 Squadron.

== Public Service Medal (PSM) ==
Branch	Recipient	Citation
Aust.	Glenys Ann Beauchamp	For outstanding public service in coordinating the Australian Government's response to the 2009 Victorian bushfires.
Aust.	Barbara May Causon	For outstanding public service in the development and implementation of improved and innovative service delivery for Indigenous Australians and as a role model for Indigenous staff.
Aust.	William Stanley Crago	For outstanding public service as a Consular Officer at the Australian Embassy in Jakarta in responding to a number of very challenging and complex consular cases.
Aust.	Philippa Margaret Godwin	For outstanding public service in leading major organisational and cultural change in a range of departments and agencies.
Aust.	Malisa de Lourdes Golightly	For outstanding public service in leading the successful implementation of Job Services Australia.
Aust.	Dr Paul Francis Grimes	For outstanding public service in development of the Australian Government's response to the 2008 financial crisis.
Aust.	Peter John Lahy	For outstanding public service in the provision of high quality legal advice to Australian Government departments and agencies.
Aust.	Shireane Kay McKinnie	For outstanding public service in the field of engineering and defence equipment acquisition.
Aust.	Michael Brian Manthorpe	For outstanding public service in contributing to the Australian Government's response to the collapse of ABC Learning Centres Ltd. in 2008.
Aust.	Stephen John Merchant	For outstanding public service in the fields of Defence strategic and international policy and intelligence collection and analysis.
Aust.	Michael Anthony Mugliston	For outstanding public service as Australia's lead negotiator for the Association of Southeast Asian Nations-Australia-New Zealand Free Trade Agreement.
Aust.	James Gerard O'Callaghan	For outstanding public service in driving significant improvements in Australia's policy and operational responses in the irregular movement of people, managed migration and humanitarian protection in the South-East Asia region.
Aust.	Robert Gordon Patch	For outstanding public service in developing the legal framework for a new national personal property securities system.
Aust.	Peter Craig Ryan	For outstanding public service in the application of signals intelligence in the field of counter-terrorism.
Aust.	Barry Keith Sterland	For outstanding public service in driving climate change policy in Australia and internationally.
Aust.	Dennis Wayne Stidston	For outstanding public service in the development and delivery of innovative commemorative activities for the Department of Veterans' Affairs in South Australia.
Aust.	Grant Ian Tidswell	For outstanding public service in leading Centrelink's response to the 2009 Victorian bushfires.
NSW	Graham Richard Boughton	For outstanding public service in the management and development of water and waste systems.
NSW	Peter James Costello	For outstanding public service to the New South Wales TAFE Commission and the Department of Education and Training.
NSW	Michael John Dodkin	For outstanding public service to the Keep Australia Beautiful NSW Tidy Towns Sustainable Communities Awards Program.
NSW	John Denis Fogarty	For outstanding public service in the investigation of financial crime.
NSW	David John Hodge	For outstanding public service in the provision of ambulance services in New South Wales.
NSW	John Stanway Hunt	For outstanding public service to local government, particularly to the Urana Shire Council.
NSW	Dr Peter Daniel Kirkland	For outstanding public service to the NSW Department of Primary Industries, animal health and the livestock industries of Australia.
NSW	John Paul Paszek	For outstanding public service to public housing tenants and disadvantaged youth.
NSW	Ronald Edward Quill	For outstanding public service in the delivery of large water infrastructure.
NSW	Leigh Rae Sanderson	For outstanding public service as General Counsel in the NSW Department of Premier and Cabinet.
NSW	Stephen John Schoupp	For outstanding public service in the continuing provision of road infrastructure in the Illawarra region.
Vic.	Brian John Fitzgerald	For outstanding public service in child protection in Victoria.
Vic.	Peter Robert Fuhrmann	For outstanding public service to public sector financial management reform in Victoria.
Vic.	Glen Jose	For outstanding public service to persons with a disability and to those who are disadvantaged within the community.
Vic.	Stuart Edward Lindner	For outstanding public service to child protection and regional leadership of the Victorian Child Protection Operating Model Demonstration Project.
Vic.	Maria Louise Lusby	For outstanding public service to judicial education.
Vic.	Bhargavi Mitchell-Dawson	For outstanding public service to public mental health services in Victoria.
Qld	Thomas Norman Fussell	For outstanding public service in Queensland through the promotion of architecture and building design.
Qld	Peter James Mulcahy	For outstanding public service through leadership in the development of key improvement and accountability initiatives across schools in Queensland.
Qld	Warren Gordon Rowe	For outstanding public service through leadership in creative town planning and urban design solutions, particularly in the Gold Coast region.
Qld	Dr Judith Ann Williams	For outstanding public service to the Wide Bay region as the Director of Paediatrics at the Bundaberg Base Hospital.
Qld	Elizabeth Anne Williamson	For outstanding public service to the performing arts in Queensland education, particularly through the delivery of Creative Generation.
WA	Maria Rosinda Seara	For outstanding public service to education, particularly at the Hamilton Senior High School, Hamilton Hill
SA	Richard John Dennis	For outstanding public service in the area of statutory interpretation nad legislative drafting.
SA	Steven Riley	For outstanding public service in the arts, specifically with regards to the South Australian Museum.
SA	Vanessa Swan	For outstanding public service in the area of policy development and service improvement to victims of sexual assault.

== Australian Police Medal (APM) ==
Branch	Recipient
Australian Federal Police	Assistant Commissioner Francis Vincent Prendergast
Australian Federal Police	Assistant Commissioner Kevin Zuccato
New South Wales Police	Sergeant Leslie John Burroughs
New South Wales Police	Superintendent Terence Charles Dalton
New South Wales Police	Inspector Gordon Dojcinovic
New South Wales Police	Detective Superintendent John Steven Kerlatec
New South Wales Police	Chief Inspector William Joseph Lardner
New South Wales Police	Inspector James William McArthur
New South Wales Police	Superintendent Michael James Robinson
New South Wales Police	Detective Inspector Gregory William Smith
Victoria Police	Chief Inspector Ronald Stuart Cooke
Victoria Police	Superintendent Peter Eugene De Santo
Victoria Police	Inspector Peter Michael Holloway
Victoria Police	Inspector Nigel John Howard
Victoria Police	Inspector Kerryn Frances Hynam
Queensland Police	Detective Superintendent Anthony James Cross
Queensland Police	Senior Sergeant Errol Jonathon Dellit
Queensland Police	Sergeant Gregory Gordon Kidd
Queensland Police	Detective Senior Sergeant Edward John Kinbacher
Queensland Police	Superintendent Garry John Moloney
Queensland Police	Inspector Deborah Joyce Platz
Western Australia Police	Assistant Commissioner Gary Elmars Dreibergs
Western Australia Police	Senior Sergeant Anthony Mettam
Western Australia Police	Senior Sergeant David Timothy Norrish
Western Australia Police	Superintendent Nigel William White
South Australia Police	Senior Sergeant First Class Thomas Michael Carter
South Australia Police	Detective Senior Sergeant Patrick Eugene McManus
South Australia Police	Superintendent Giovanni Venditto
Tasmania Police	Sergeant Elwyn James Williams
Northern Territory Police	Senior Sergeant Vincent Michael Kelly

== Australian Fire Service Medal (AFSM) ==
Branch	Recipient
New South Wales Fire Services	Ian Charles Bartholomew
New South Wales Fire Services	Allan Vincent Carey
New South Wales Fire Services	Barry Howard Carr
New South Wales Fire Services	Kevin Cooper
New South Wales Fire Services	James Patrick Flynn
New South Wales Fire Services	Dr Kenneth Charles Hughes
New South Wales Fire Services	Christopher Ernst Jurgeit
New South Wales Fire Services	John Michael McNamara
New South Wales Fire Services	Robert John McNeil
New South Wales Fire Services	Kenneth James Neville
New South Wales Fire Services	Geoffrey Colin Thiessen
Victoria Fire Services	Ian Daniel Board
Victoria Fire Services	Noel Charles Flakemore
Victoria Fire Services	John Beresford Gerrand
Victoria Fire Services	Rodney William Holland
Victoria Fire Services	Bryan Charles McCarthy
Victoria Fire Services	Peter Vincent Rice
Victoria Fire Services	Peter Russell Sandell
Victoria Fire Services	Ian Claude Walter
Victoria Fire Services	Andrew Allan Wilson
Queensland Fire Services	Colin Frank Harch
Queensland Fire Services	Ronald Francis Stemm
Queensland Fire Services	Ivan Ernest Western
Western Australia Fire Services	Robert Henry Stoner
South Australia Fire Services	Anthony Leonard Wege
South Australia Fire Services	Trudy Lola Whelan
Australian Capital Territory Fire Services	Brian Phillip Murphy

== Ambulance Service Medal (ASM) ==
Branch	Recipient
Queensland Ambulance Service	Gerardus Hendrikus Rabelink
Queensland Ambulance Service	Dr Stephen James Rashford
South Australia Ambulance Service	Keith Allen Driscoll
Australian Capital Territory Ambulance Service	Rebecca Ruth Lundy

== Emergency Services Medal (ESM) ==
Branch	Recipient
Queensland Emergency Services	Reginald James Marshall
Queensland Emergency Services	Thomas William Short
Queensland Emergency Services	Peter Taylor
Western Australia Emergency Services	Alfred George Bairstow
Western Australia Emergency Services	Colin James Bairstow
Western Australia Emergency Services	Gary John Gifford
South Australia Emergency Services	Robert William Pycroft

== Commendation for Gallantry ==
Branch	Recipient	Citation
Army	Corporal A—	For acts of gallantry in action in Afghanistan in 2008.
Army	Private D—	For acts of gallantry in action in Afghanistan in 2009.

== Distinguished Service Medal (DSM) ==
Branch	Recipient	Citation
Army	Warrant Officer Class Two Paul Robert Boswell	For distinguished leadership in action while the Troop Sergeant Major with the Royal Australian Artillery Troop, Afghanistan, Rotation Two and attached to the 29th Commando Regiment (United Kingdom).
Army	Major G—	For distinguished leadership in action in Afghanistan in 2009.
Army	Captain I—	For distinguished leadership in action in Afghanistan in 2009.
Army	Sergeant P—	For distinguished leadership in action in Afghanistan in 2009.

== Commendation for Distinguished Service ==
Branch	Recipient	Citation
Army	Sergeant Jason Carter	For distinguished performance of duty in warlike operations while the Regimental Aid Post Sergeant, Mentoring and Reconstruction Task Force 1 in Afghanistan in 2009.
Army	Sergeant D—	For distinguished performance of duty in warlike operations and in action in Afghanistan in 2009.
Army	Warrant Officer Class Two J—	For distinguished performance of duty in warlike operations as an Operations Officer in Afghanistan in 2009.
Army	Lieutenant Ashley David Judd	For distinguished performance of duty in warlike operations and in action while commanding 2 Platoon, Combat Team Tusk, 7th Battalion Battle Group (Mentoring and Reconstruction Task Force 1) in the Chora Valley, Afghanistan on 29 December 2008.
Army	Lieutenant Colonel Eamon Patrick Lenaghan	For distinguished performance of duty in warlike operations as the principal Operations Planning Staff Officer at Headquarters Regional Command (South), International Security Assistance Force, Kandahar Airfield, Afghanistan.
Army	Major M—	For distinguished performance of duty in warlike operations and in action in Afghanistan in 2009.
Army	Sergeant S—	For distinguished performance of duty in warlike operations and in action in Afghanistan in 2009.

== Bar to the Conspicuous Service Cross ==
Branch	Recipient	Citation
Army	Colonel Jeffrey Martin Quirk CSC	For outstanding achievement as the Director Coordination – Army, Army Headquarters.

== Conspicuous Service Cross (CSC) ==
Branch	Recipient	Citation
Navy	Lieutenant Commander Hugh Wade Cameron RAN	For outstanding achievement as the Joint Education, Training and Warfare Command and Australian Defence Force Academy Legal Officer.
Navy	Captain Luke Charles-Jones OAM, RAN	For outstanding achievement as Director of Maritime Operations, Navy Strategic Command.
Navy	Warrant Officer Martin Grant Holzberger	For outstanding achievement as the Ship's Warrant Officer, HMAS Warramunga.
Navy	Commander Stephen Mark O'Hearn RAN	For outstanding achievement as the Project Manager for the Collins Class Submarines Replacement Combat System.
Navy	Warrant Officer Andrew Wilfred Roach	For outstanding achievement in the field of aviation maintenance in the Royal Australian Navy.
Navy	Lieutenant Commander William Lemesurier Waters RAN	For outstanding achievement in the development, planning and conduct of operations at the United States Navy's Surface Warfare Development Group, as Operations Coordinator at Fleet Headquarters and as Executive Officer HMAS Sydney.
Army	Lieutenant Colonel Kathryn Jane Campbell	For outstanding achievement as the Commanding Officer of the Sydney University Regiment.
Army	Lieutenant Colonel Andrew Cohn	For outstanding achievement in the area of psychological resilience training, research and evaluation, and progression of the Australian Defence Force Mental Health Strategy.
Army	Lieutenant Colonel Steven John Frankel	For outstanding achievement as Staff Officer Grade One Communications and Information Systems and Electronic Warfare Development, Army Headquarters.
Army	Brigadier William Alfred Grice	For outstanding achievement as the Director-General Infrastructure Asset Development.
Army	Lieutenant Colonel Jason James Hedges	For outstanding achievement as the Chief of Staff to Career Management – Army in 2009.
Army	Lieutenant Colonel Stuart Nicholas Kenny	For outstanding achievement as the Commanding Officer of the 1st Field Regiment.
Army	Lieutenant Colonel M—	For outstanding achievement as the Officer Commanding Logistics Support Squadron, Special Air Service Regiment.
Army	Colonel Craig Andrew Schramm	For outstanding achievement as the Commanding Officer of the 2nd Health Support Battalion and Senior Health Officer, South Queensland.
Army	Brigadier William Timothy Sowry	For outstanding devotion to duty in a non-warlike situation as Commander International Stabilisation Force in East Timor.
Air Force	Sergeant Kevin Roy Aldridge	For outstanding achievement as the Senior Non-Commissioned Officer-in-Charge of the Fuel Quality Control Centre at Combat Support Unit Pearce.
Air Force	Flight Lieutenant Joleen Kim Darby	For outstanding achievement in the application of exceptional skills as the medical officer in HMAS Childers on Thursday, 16 April 2009.
Air Force	Squadron Leader John Martin Haly	For outstanding achievement as an Exchange Officer and Detachment Commander, Australian Super Hornet Transition Team.
Air Force	Sergeant Michael Johnathon Horner	For outstanding achievement as an instructor at Number 2929 Squadron and as the Senior Non-Commissioned Officer in Charge of Number 11 Squadron flightline operations.
Air Force	Group Captain Mark Kenneth Scougall	For outstanding achievement as the Commanding Officer of the C-17 Logistics Management Unit.
Air Force	Corporal Andrew Garry Turnbull	For outstanding achievement as the Simulatr Operator Supervisor at Surveillance and Control Training Unit.

== Conspicuous Service Medal (CSM) ==
Branch	Recipient	Citation
Navy	Lieutenant Commander Edward Michael Doncaster RAN	For meritorious achievement as Staff Officer International Engagement in Navy Strategic Command.
Navy	Lieutenant Commander Peter James Foster RAN	For meritorious devotion to duty as the Marine Engineering Officer in HMAS Arunta during its assignment as a training ship.
Navy	Petty Officer Emma Dawn Procopis	For meritorious achievement as the Communication Centre Manager at HMAS Waterhen.
Army	Warrant Officer Class Two Ian David Broadbent	For meritorious devotion to duty as the Operations Warrant Officer of Headquarters 1st Division, especially in support of operational and logistic readiness of the Deployable Joint Force Headquarters capability.
Army	Warrant Officer Class Two Melissa Jane Churchill	For meritorious devotion to duty as the Warrant Officer Personnel at Headquarters South Queensland Australian Army Cadets Brigade in support of youth development.
Army	Corporal Meagan Jane Holmes	For meritorious devotion to duty as the unit pay representative of the 3rd Combat Engineer Regiment.
Army	Warrant Officer Class One Lesley Anne Hunt	For outstanding achievement as the Warrant Officer Administration for the Active and Standby Staff Group.
Army	Corporal Christopher Johansson	For meritorious achievement in a non-warlike situation as the Acting Regimental Quartermaster with Joint Task Force 631 in East Timor in 2008.
Army	Warrant Officer Class One Michael Walter King	For meritorious devotion to duty as the Quartermaster of the 12th/40th Battalion, The Royal Tasmania Regiment.
Army	Major Jodie Karla Lording	For meritorious achievement as the Second-in-Command and Officer Commanding the 8th Brigade Operational Support Company in 2008 and 2009.
Army	Sergeant Lachlan McMahon	For meritorious devotion to duty as the Telecommunication System Supervisor, Telecommunication System Manager and Telecommunication System Engineer of the 1st Signal Regiment.
Army	Major Brett Adam Nelson	For meritorious achievement as the Officer-in-Charge of the Specialist Recruiting Team – Engineering, Defence Force Recruiting, Victoria.
Army	Major Justin Stafford Olde	For meritorious achievement as a Trial Manager at the Australian Defence Test and Evaluation Office, Capability Development Group, particularly as the Trial Director for the Project Land 121 Medium/Heavy Vehicle Comparative Evaluation Trial.
Army	Major Mark Donald Riddle	For meritorious achievement in the development of a data management system for the Australian Army's Doctrine Wing.
Army	Sergeant Phillip Robert Scanlan	For meritorious achievement as a Battery Quartermaster Sergeant, 16th Air Defence Regiment and Company Quartermaster Sergeant, Timor Leste Battle Group Five.
Army	Warrant Officer Class Two Wayne Michael Vickers	For meritorious achievement as the Force Protection Electronic Counter Measures Warrant Officer Instructor at the Defence Force School of Signals.
Air Force	Flight Sergeant Matthew Reginald Clarke	For meritorious achievement as Assistant Staff Officer – Network Engineer, Defence Network Support Agency.
Air Force	Squadron Leader Cameron John Cornell	For meritorious achievement as Staff Officer, Australian Super Hornet Transition Team.
Air Force	Sergeant Ross Phillip Graham	For meritorious achievement as the Senior Non-Commissioned Officer in Charge of Ground Support Equipment section at Number 75 Squadron.
Air Force	Sergeant Angela Renee Maher	For meritorious achievement as the Training Developer – Electronic Intelligence at the Defence Force School of Signals Electronic Warfare Wing.
