= DigiDirect =

Australian company

DigiDirect Group
- Type: Private
- Founded: 2006
- Founder: Shant Kradjian
- Key people: Shant Kradjian (Chairman and CEO)
- Subsidiaries: DigiDirect; Booktopia (including Angus & Robertson); James Bennett; Mwave
- Website: digidirect.com.au

The DigiDirect Group is an Australian company. It owns the consumer electronics retail chain DigiDirect, online book retailers Booktopia and Angus & Robertson, library supplier James Bennett and computer hardware retailer Mwave.

== History ==
DigiDirect was founded in 2006 by Shant Kradjian as an online camera equipment business. The first DigiDirect store was opened in Westfield Bondi Junction. By 2016, the company had stores in Victoria, New South Wales and Queensland. In August 2016, DigiDirect opened its seventh store and entered the Western Australian market after acquiring a camera store in Cannington.

DigiDirect was fined $39,240 in June 2021 by the Australian Competition and Consumer Commission (ACCC) for three alleged instances of misleading advertising in 2020.

In February 2024, DigiDirect launched DigiMarket, an online third-party marketplace. In August 2024, DigiDirect acquired online book retailer Booktopia after the company went into administration in July. The acquisition also included the Angus & Robertson and Co-Op Bookshop brands and about $14 million in inventory. In September 2024, over 304,000 DigiDirect customer records were leaked online after a cybersecurity breach.

In May 2025, DigiDirect purchased library supplier James Bennett from US company Baker & Taylor. The following month, it acquired computer hardware retailer Mwave after it went into voluntary administration. In September 2025, DigiDirect launched retail media network, DigiConnect.

In September 2026, DigiDirect was fined $99,000 by the ACCC for misleading advertising on some products.
