= Wodak =

Wodak may refer to:

== People ==
- Ruth Wodak (born 1950), distinguished Professor and Chair in Discourse Studies at Lancaster University
- Alex Wodak, physician and director of the Alcohol and Drug Service, St Vincent's Hospital, Sydney since 1982
- Shoshana Wodak, BA in Chemical physics, Université libre de Bruxelles
- Ersnt Arnost Wodak, surgeon
- Natasha Wodak (born 1981), Canadian long-distance runner
