= Talal Yassine =

Lebanese Australian entrepreneur, lawyer, and philanthropist

Talal Yassine AM
- Born: 1 January 1972 (age 54); Lebanon
- Education: University of Sydney; Macquarie University; Deakin University
- Occupations: Businessman, adjunct professor
- Known for: Founder and Managing Director of Salaam
- Children: Four
- Awards: Medal of the Order of Australia (OAM) later upgraded to Member of the Order of Australia (AM)
- Website: talalyassine.com.au

Talal Yassine (born 1 January 1972) is a Lebanese Australian businessman. He is the founder and managing director of Salaam, an Australian wealth management company. Salaam launched Australia's first superannuation fund which is Islamic-compliant as well as the nation's first Islamic-compliant stock market index. He holds an honorary professorial fellowship at the Crawford School of Public Policy within the Australian National University College of Asia and the Pacific and serves as an adjunct professor in the School of Business at Western Sydney University. In March 2024, Talal was appointed as an adjunct fellow with the Macquarie University Law School.

Yassine served as chairman of the council for Australian-Arab Relations for the Department of Foreign Affairs and Trade (DFAT), a member of the board of DFAT's Australia Malaysia Institute, and a member of Australian Multicultural Council.

Yassine is a Member of the Order of Australia in recognition of "significant service to business, and to the community".

== Early life and education ==
Yassine was born in Lebanon to his father, Ali, a tobacco farmer, and his mother, Fatma Yassine on 1 January 1977. He has seven siblings. Talal and his family migrated to Sydney, Australia in 1977 due to the then-ongoing Lebanese Civil War. His father worked in a factory while his mother looked after the family. Education was prioritised in the household, although neither parent was highly educated and the family struggled financially. All of the children have since become professionals and have about 30 degrees between them.

Talal attended Granville Boys High School from 1984 to 1990, and wished to become a lawyer. He studied at the University of Sydney, then transferred to Macquarie University where he graduated with an arts degree and law degree. He holds a master of laws from the University of Sydney and a master of business administration from Deakin University.

== Career ==
Yassine started working at law firm Dunhill Madden Butler, which later merged with accounting company Price Waterhouse Coopers in 2000. Later, he entered politics by putting his name down for Australian Labor Party's (ALP) preselection for the legislative seat of Auburn in 2001. ALP Premier Bob Carr, in his book, Run For Your Life, said that the party passed over Yassine amidst intense anti-Lebanese, anti-Muslim sentiments after a series of gang rape attacks were committed against women in Sydney by Lebanese Australian youths led by serial rapist Bilal Skaf a year before. Carr later characterised the decision as unfair and unjust to Yassine. However, Yassine stated in the ABC's RN interview that he was fortunate he did not push through with politics then as anti-Islamic rhetoric intensified when weeks after the 2001 election, the September 11 attacks occurred.

Yassine worked in corporate finance and technical real estate divisions for investment bank and fund manager Babcock & Brown Ltd for two years and quit to work on other projects before the company collapsed in 2009. During the Global Financial Crisis in 2008/9 Talal, together with Ben Keneally, and Evan Thornley, co-founded the Australian division of the Israel and Silicon Valley based electric car company, Better Place, and was responsible for the company's business development and strategic partnership. In mid-2011, he stepped back from the day-to-day management of the company.

In 2017, Yassine was board secretary for The Co-op Bookshop, during which a student-led campaign unsuccessfully attempted to remove the board over accusations of corruption, mismanagement, substandard governance, and anti-democratic practices. In November 2019 the Co-op was put into administration, as its books sales on university campuses was challenged by Amazon and other global online competitors. The PwC voluntary administrators’ report for The Co-op stated that a five year, $55,000 a month consulting agreement involving Yassine’s company was “in excess of the reasonable costs” of an arm’s-length supplier and “uncommercial”.

Yassine is currently Executive Chairman of the family affiliated First Quay Capital and LandCorp Australia, and is also a Board member of Taronga Zoo.

Yassine has served as non-executive director on the board of Australian Postal from 2 August 2012 until August 2015. Yassine was also member of the boards of Sydney Ports, Sydney West Area Health Service,.He was a member of the Council for Australian-Arab Relations for the Department of Foreign Affairs and Trade (DFAT) for four years, serving as chairman for three years, a member of the board of DFAT's Australia Malaysia Institute, and a member of the Australian Multicultural Council.

Yassine is an adjunct Business School professor at the University of Western Sydney and serves as an honorary professorial fellow at Crawford School of Public Policy within The Australian National University. He was a board member of the Whitlam Institute (within Western Sydney University) as well as Macquarie University.

=== Islamic-compliant superannuation in Australia ===
Yassine founded Crescent Wealth, the first wealth management firm in Australia which offered Islamic-compliant investments (avoiding investments in, for instance, tobacco- and pornography-related entities). In an interview by The Australian, he stated that after he failed to find investment products that would satisfy Islamic requirements, he established the company in partnership with US fund manager Saturna Capital to oversee international shares, with Sigma Funds to handle local shares portfolio, and with the Islamic finance subsidiary of HSBC Bank. In November 2010, it was granted the Australian Securities and Investments Commission's Australian Financial Services Licence. By 2011, it launched Crescent Australian Equity fund with $5.5 million of seed capital from Aon Hewitt targeting the retail market and self-managed superannuation funds (SMSF) in particular.

The company also launched Crescent Wealth Superannuation Fund, the country's first Islamic superannuation fund, on 17 December 2012. Complying with Islamic guidelines, it does not invest in alcohol, gambling, pornography, weapons, pork, and financial stocks like banks due to a ban on interest charges. In February 2012, Crescent Wealth in partnership with Thomson Reuters launched the Thomson Reuters Crescent Wealth Islamic Australia index, Australia's first Islamic equities index.

In 2022, the Australian Financial Review reported that Crescent Wealth’s trustee had found in its annual Member Outcomes Assessment that the fund’s fees and costs were “not appropriate having regard to their [members’] financial interests” and that its net returns were “not consistent with market rates”. The newspaper reported that the fund had achieved a five-year return of 3.22 per cent per annum to July 2021 against an annual target return of 8.51 per cent, with total fees of 2.29 per cent.

Later that year, the Australian Financial Review reported that Equity Trustees had issued a Significant Event Notice concerning the fund’s disclosure of investment costs to members. According to the newspaper, the notice stated that some costs had been incorrectly disclosed and that Equity Trustees was reviewing Crescent Wealth’s suitability as responsible entity following the findings.

In 2023, the Crescent Wealth Superannuation Fund, promoted by Crescent Wealth and overseen by Equity Trustees, failed the Australian Prudential Regulation Authority (APRA) choice performance test. Members of the fund were transferred in 2024 to the Salaam Superannuation Division of the Russell Investments Master Trust via a successor fund transfer (SFT), which is not subject to APRA's choice performance test.

Talal Yassine is host of the podcast Uncommon Ground where he interviews leaders in business, media, sport and politics.

== Recognition ==
Yassine received a Medal of the Order of Australia in 2010 for his services to business, education, and multicultural community. He was promoted to Member of the Order of Australia in the 2024 King's Birthday Honours for "significant service to business, and to the community".

Yassine received the Professional of the Year Award in 2012 from Australian Muslim Achievement Awards. He won the Man of the Year Award on the 2016 Australian Muslim Achievement Awards, with Crescent Wealth winning Business of the Year Award and Event of the Year Award. During the 24th Sir Syed Day organised by Aligarh Muslim University Alumni of Australia on 11 February 2017 he was given recognition for his outstanding contribution to the community. He was included in The Muslim 500: The World's 500 Most Influential Muslims in 2016, 2017 and 2018.

== Personal life ==
Yassine is married and has several children.
