= Lesley Johnson =

Australian cultural historian

Lesley Johnson AM FAHA
- Born: 12 April 1949 (age 77); Sydney, New South Wales, Australia

Academic background
- Education: University of Sydney; University of Queensland
- Alma mater: Monash University
- Thesis: The concept of culture and the English intellectual, 1850–1975 (1976)

Lesley Ruth Johnson AM FAHA (born 1949) is an Australian cultural historian, whose research has focused on gender studies and the sociology of education. She is professor emeritus at Griffith University.

== Early life and education ==
Johnson was born in Sydney, New South Wales on 12 April 1949. She was educated in the public school system at Denistone East Public School and then Ryde High School. She won a Commonwealth Scholarship to study at the University of Sydney and graduated with a BA in 1968. She moved to Brisbane where she undertook a Master of Education at the University of Queensland (1972). Johnson won a Commonwealth Postgraduate Award that allowed her to complete a PhD (1976) at Monash University with her thesis, The concept of culture and the English intellectual, 1850–1975.

== Career ==
Johnson's career as an academic began with a tutoring position at the University of Queensland in 1972 to 1973. She was appointed lecturer at the University of Melbourne in 1976, progressing to reader in 1990.

Back in Sydney, in 1992 Johnson was professor of communication at Western Sydney University. She then jointly filled the positions of professor of cultural studies and pro vice chancellor for research at the University of Technology, Sydney from 1995 to 2004. She published "Sentenced to Everyday Life: Feminism and the Housewife" and moved to Queensland in 2004 as deputy vice chancellor (research) at Griffith University, remaining there until she retired in 2009.

In "retirement" she was president of the Australian Academy of the Humanities from 2011 to 2014 and served as president of the Australian Council of Learned Academies in 2013.

== Awards and recognition ==
Johnson was elected a Fellow of the Australian Academy of the Humanities in 1999.

She was awarded the Centenary Medal in 2001. She was made a Member of the Order of Australia in the 2010 Queen's Birthday Honours for "service to education as a leading academic, administrator and author, particularly in the fields of cultural history and feminist studies, and through the establishment of research centres for a range of disciplines".

Johnson was named professor emeritus at the University of Technology Sydney in 2004 and of Griffith University in 2011.

== Selected works ==
- Johnson, Lesley (1979), The cultural critics from Matthew Arnold to Raymond Williams, London Routledge & Kegan Paul, ISBN 978-0-7100-7678-6
- Johnson, Lesley (1988), The unseen voice: A cultural analysis of early Australian radio, Methuen (published 1987), ISBN 978-0-416-08102-2
- Johnson, Lesley (1993), The modern girl: Girlhood and growing up, Open University Press, ISBN 978-0-335-09998-6
- Johnson, Lesley; Lloyd, Justine (November 2004), Sentenced to everyday life: Feminism and the housewife, Berg (published 2004), ISBN 978-1-84520-031-2
