= Booktopia =

Australian online bookstore

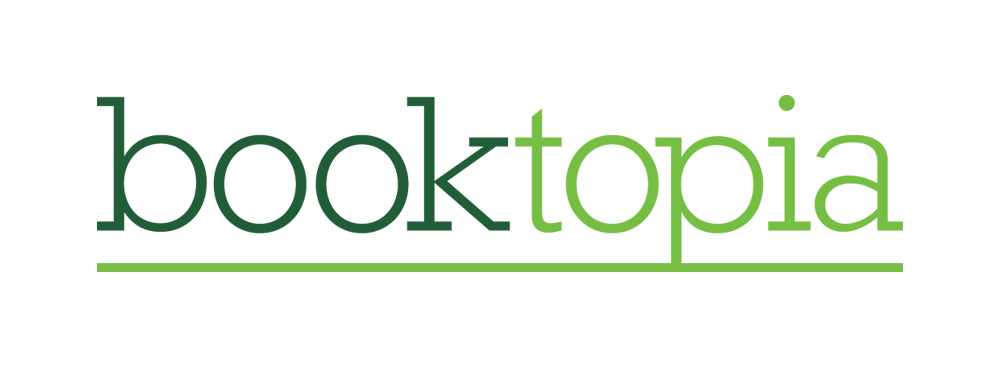
- Website type: E-commerce
- Available in: English
- Founded: 4 February 2004; 14 August 2024 (current entity)
- Headquarters: Strathfield South, New South Wales, Australia
- Country of origin: Australia
- Founders: Tony Nash; Simon Nash; Steve Traurig
- Industry: Bookselling, book distributor, book publisher, online shopping
- Products: Books; DVDs eBooks; Stationery; Magazines; Audiobooks; Calendars, diaries, journals
- Revenue: $240 million (FY22)
- Employees: 160
- Subsidiaries: Angus & Robertson; The Co-op Bookshop (online only)
- Website: booktopia.com.au
- Launched: 4 February 2004

Booktopia Direct Pty Ltd is an Australian-owned, online bookseller and distributor headquartered in Sydney. The company also owns Angus & Robertson, a major Australian online bookseller, publisher, and printer. Founded in 2004, it has been one of the country’s leading online book retailers, with a broad catalogue spanning physical books, eBooks and audiobooks. Following a period of financial difficulty, the company briefly entered voluntary administration in 2024 and was subsequently acquired by the DigiDirect Group, continuing operations under new ownership.

== History ==
Booktopia was founded in 2004 by Tony Nash, his brother Simon Nash, and his brother-in-law Steve Traurig. By some accounts, Nash's sister Elana Traurig was also among the company's founders. They outsourced website management and order fulfillment until 2007, when they developed a new website and began renting a 500 square-meter warehouse in Artarmon. Two years later, they moved to a larger warehouse in Lane Cove. In 2013, Booktopia was voted as Australia's favourite bookshop in a poll by the Australian Booksellers' Association.

Booktopia moved to a 10,000 square-meter warehouse in Lidcombe in 2014, where they invested $4 million into automation of order picking. By this point, they had a turnover of $54 million, and shipped nearly 3 million books a year. In August 2015, Booktopia bought online retailers Bookworld and Angus & Robertson from Penguin Random House. This acquisition reportedly gave Booktopia an 80% share of the online book sales market in Australia.

In 2016, the company announced that it intended to list on the Australian Securities Exchange (ASX) with a $150 million initial public offering, but this float was abandoned due to investor concerns about Amazon's 2017 expansion into Australia affecting the business.

Four years later, Booktopia successfully listed on the ASX in December 2020. Selling 18.8 million shares at an issue price of $2.30, the company raised $43.1 million on a market capitalisation of $357 million. According to the prospectus issued before its IPO, Booktopia accounted for approximately 6% of Australian book sales by this point.

In the same year, 2020, they bought university bookstore chain The Co-op Bookshop after that business went into administration, closing its 30 physical stores and moving its textbook sales business online.

In 2020, Booktopia launched a joint venture with Rakuten Kobo to provide eBook and downloadable audiobooks through the Booktopia/Rakuten Kobo app.

CEO Tony Nash sold $6 million worth of his shares on 6 December 2021, shortly before the company announced it was anticipating a drop in earnings. Amidst investor ire over the timing of this sale as well as plunging earnings, in May 2022 Nash announced that he would be stepping down from his role as CEO once a replacement had been found. However, in July, the company's board forced Nash to step down earlier than expected, appointing CFO Geoff Stalley as his interim replacement. In August, Nash announced that he intended to spill the board, hoping to remove the chairman and other members. Later that month, the company was forced to pay $6 million by the Australian Competition & Consumer Commission on the grounds that it had misrepresented consumers' rights to refunds and returns.

From a high of $3 in August 2021, the company's share price steadily crashed to reach $0.17 by June 2022; Booktopia suggested this was due to a decline in business faced by online retailers after the lifting of pandemic restrictions. In June 2024, Booktopia requested a suspension on trading of its shares, which had by then fallen to $0.05. (It was later compulsorily delisted in August.)

In June 2024, Booktopia announced it would make at least 50 employees redundant in addition to other cost-saving measures. Leadership changes including the resignation of chief executive David Nenke were also announced.

In July 2024, Booktopia entered voluntary administration and temporarily shut down their website. The administrator disclosed that the company held debts totaling around $60 million. Writing in The Conversation, Australian academics Katya Johanson and Bronwyn Reddan cited competition from Amazon, increased operating costs, and a slump in book sales after the Covid boom as factors in the business's demise. Australian business publication iTnews also reported that costs from setting up the Strathfield warehouse had caused the business to sustain heavy losses in the lead-up to its collapse.

In August 2024, Booktopia was bought by the digiDirect Group for an undisclosed amount, who immediately resumed trading following the deal. In 2025, the digiDirect Group also acquired James Bennett Pty Ltd, Australia's leading local library supplier.

As of April 2026, Booktopia sells well over 10,000 books a day across Australia and New Zealand.
