= Samina Yasmeen =

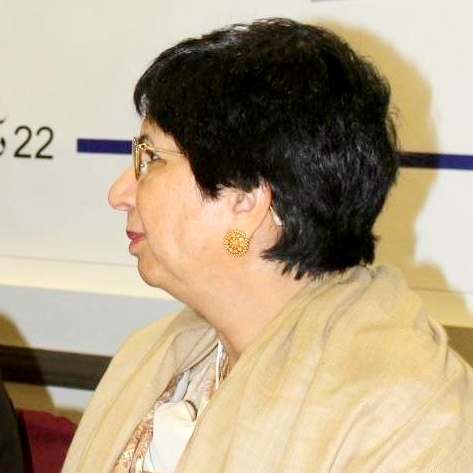
- Born: Samina Yasmeen; 1950 (age 75–76); Pakistan
- Occupation: Author
- Spouse: James Trevelyan

Samina Yasmeen AM is an Australian–Pakistani author and intellectual who is known for her work in political and strategic development in South Asia and the role of Islam in world politics. She has published articles on the position of Pakistani and Middle Eastern women, the role of Muslims in Australia, and India–Pakistan relations.

== Life and career ==
Yasmeen was born in 1950. Her research focuses on the role of Islamic groups in Pakistan's foreign policy. On Australian and international media, she is a regular commentator on issues relating to Islam, Pakistan, citizenship among immigrant women and Muslim immigrants in Pakistan.

Samina Yasmeen is from a literary family in Pakistan. Her mother Begum Sarfraz Iqbal was a prominent littérateur of Pakistan, and a road in Islamabad, the capital of Pakistan, is named after her in recognition of her contribution to literature.

She was appointed to the Council for Multicultural Australia in August 2011.

In 2014, her book, Muslim Citizens in the West, was published. One year later, it was reviewed by the Journal of Islamic Studies.

Yasmeen is married to an Australian engineer, James Trevelyan.

== Awards and recognition ==
- Western Australian of the Year Award (2011)
- Fellow of Australian Institute of International Affairs (2012)

== Bibliography ==
- Yasmeen, Samina; Markovic, Nina (2014). Muslim Citizens in the West
