= Multiculturalism in Australia =

Feature of Australian society

Multiculturalism in Australia is today reflected by the multicultural composition of its people, its immigration policies, its prohibition on discrimination, equality before the law of all persons, as well as various cultural policies which promote diversity, such as the formation of the Special Broadcasting Service.

According to the 2011 census, 26% of the population were born overseas and a further 20% had at least one parent born overseas. Aboriginal Australians make up approximately 2.5% of the population. Australia's diverse migrant communities have brought with them food, lifestyle and cultural practices, which have been absorbed into mainstream Australian culture.

From Federation until after the Second World War, Australia adhered to the White Australia policy. The policy was dismantled after the war by various changes to the immigration policy of the Australian government.

== History ==
=== Pre-Federation ===
Prior to European colonisation, the Australian continent had been inhabited by various Aboriginal peoples for around 60,000 years, and the Torres Strait Islands was inhabited by various groups of Torres Strait Islander peoples. Among them they spoke at least 250 mutually unintelligible languages (linguist Claire Bowern suggests up to 363), which included around 800 dialects. An estimated 120 of these were still spoken as of 2016, and several more are being revived through language revival programmes.

Makassan trepangers (along with shipwrecked Dutch sailors) made contact with Indigenous Australians along the northern coast of Australia during the 17th and mid-18th centuries, although this did not lead to permanent settlement. Beginning with the arrival of the First Fleet in 1788, waves of European settlers began to emigrate to the Australian continent. By 1901, the Australian continent consisted of six British colonies, which in 1901 agreed to federate into one state.

=== White Australia policy ===
The Immigration Restriction Act 1901, known informally as the White Australia policy, restricted non-European immigration to Australia from 1901 to 1973. The policy limited the ethnic and cultural diversity of the immigrant population. The policy was an attempt to preserve the "Anglo-Saxon" ethno-cultural identity of the Australian nation, promote European immigration, and to exclude persons who did not fit the European, predominantly Anglo-Celtic, character of Australian society. As the twentieth century progressed and the number of migrants from the United Kingdom became insufficient to meet labour shortages, immigrants came increasingly from other parts of Europe, such as Italy, Greece, Germany, the Netherlands, and the former Yugoslavia. The prevailing attitude to migrant settlement up until this time was based on the expectation of assimilation—that is, that migrants should shed their cultures and languages and rapidly become indistinguishable from the host population.

=== Emergence of multiculturalism ===
People whose parents were both born in Australia percentage of the population in Australia divided geographically by statistical local area, as of the 2011 census

From the mid-1960s until 1973, when the final vestiges of the White Australia policy were removed, policies started to examine assumptions about assimilation. They recognised that many migrants, especially those whose first language was not English, experienced hardships as they settled in Australia, and required more direct assistance. Governments also recognised the importance of ethnic organisations in helping with migrant settlement. Expenditure on migrant assistance and welfare increased in the early 1970s in response to these needs.

Following the initial moves of the Whitlam government in 1973, further official national multicultural policies were implemented by Fraser's conservative Coalition government in 1978. The Labor Government of Bob Hawke continued with these policies during the 1980s and early 1990s, and were further supported by Paul Keating up to his electoral defeat 1996. "CALD" (or Culturally and Linguistically Diverse) policies continue to be implemented at all levels of government and public service, such as medical support systems which cater specifically to non-English speaking residents.

The meaning of multiculturalism has been altered significantly since its formal introduction to Australia. Originally it was understood by the mainstream population as a need for acceptance that many members of the Australian community originally came from different cultures and still had ties to it. However, it came to mean the rights of migrants within mainstream Australia to express their cultural identity. It is now often used to refer to the notion that people in Australia have multiple cultural or ethnic backgrounds.

The overall level of immigration to Australia has grown during the last decades. Net overseas immigrants increased from 30,000 in 1993 to 118,000 in 2003–04, and 262,500 in 2016–17.

According to the 2011 census, 26% of the population were born overseas, with a further 20% having at least one parent born overseas. Of the population born overseas, 82% lived in the capital cities. Aboriginal Australians make up approximately 2.5% of the population. In 2008, Australia was ranked 18th in the world in terms of net migration per capita, ahead of Canada, the US and most of Europe.

According to the National Agenda for a Multicultural Australia in 2014, the Australian Government was concerned with three broad policy areas: cultural identity, social justice, and economic efficiency.

== Terminology ==
Members of a multicultural community who are not of Anglo-Australian background and/or not "assimilated", in that they are born elsewhere and speak another language at home, are sometimes referred to in policy discourse as culturally and linguistically diverse (CALD), particularly in Australia, where it was introduced in 1996 to replace non-English speaking background (NESB), as it goes beyond linguistic factors. The term is mostly used to "distinguish the mainstream community from those in which English is not the main language and/or cultural norms and values differ", but is not inclusive of Aboriginal and Torres Strait Islander people, to whom a different set of attributes belong.

== Timeline ==
By 1973, the term "multiculturalism" had been introduced, and migrant groups were forming state and national associations to maintain their cultures, and promote the survival of their languages and heritages within mainstream institutions. Professor Jerzy Zubrzycki pursued multiculturalism as a social policy while chair of the Social Patterns Committee of the Immigration Advisory Council to the Whitlam Labor government.

The following is a timeline of government policies on and various bodies created to support multiculturalism over the years:

- 1973 – Al Grassby, Minister for Immigration in the Whitlam government, issued a reference paper entitled "A multi-cultural society for the future".
- 1975 – At a ceremony proclaiming the Racial Discrimination Act 1975, the Prime Minister referred to Australia as a "multicultural nation". The Prime Minister and Leader of the Opposition made speeches demonstrating for the first time that multiculturalism was becoming a major political priority on both sides of politics.
- 1977 – the Australian Ethnic Affairs Council, appointed to advise the Fraser Liberal-Country Party Government, recommended a public policy of multiculturalism in its report Australia as a multicultural society.
- 1978 – the first official national multicultural policies were implemented by the Fraser government, in accord with recommendations of the Galbally Report in the context of government programs and services for migrants.
- 1979 – an Act of Parliament established the Australian Institute of Multicultural Affairs (AIMA), whose objectives included raising awareness of cultural diversity and promoting social cohesion, understanding and tolerance.
- 1986 – the AIMA Act was repealed by the Hawke government, which, in 1987, created the Office of Multicultural Affairs (OMA) in the Department of the Prime Minister and Cabinet. This was partly because of a poor reaction to their 1986 budget, which led to the need for better information to be gathered on multicultural issues, and it was recommended by the Jupp Review of Migrant and Multicultural Programs and Services. Putting it in PMC gave multicultural affairs the same status as women's and Aboriginal issues. Peter Shergold was appointed director, who turned the focus on the economic benefits of a culturally diverse society. OMA advised the PM and Minister for Immigration and Ethnic Affairs as well as the newly-established Australian Council of Multicultural Affairs, with Justice Sir James Gobbo as chair.
- 1987 - adoption by Federal cabinet of the National Policy on Languages. This was the first explicit language policy in Australia and combined a focus on multicultural rights (through support of community languages, interpreting and translating and related issues), with social cohesion (support for English and English literacy, and inter-ethnic education), Indigenous rights (through diverse First Nations languages support and recognition) and Australia's external relations and integration into Asian regional affairs (through promotion of key languages of Asia). The principles of the NPL have continued in the decades since its adoption in state and other federal policy settings.
- 1989 – following community consultations and drawing on the advice of the Advisory Council for Multicultural Affairs (ACMA), the Hawke government produced the National Agenda for a Multicultural Australia, which had bipartisan political support.
- 1991 onwards – Paul Keating became Prime Minister, and the OMA was gradually wound down.
- 1994 – a National Multicultural Advisory Council was established to review and update the national agenda. Its report, launched in June 1995, found that much had been achieved and recommended further initiatives.
- 1996 – following the election of the Howard government in March 1996, OMA was absorbed into the then Department of Immigration and Multicultural Affairs at the end of June 1996, but with no resources. The last head of OMA, Bill Cope said that the new treasurer, Peter Costello, told the new minister, Phillip Ruddock, that all funds for multiculturalism were to be withdrawn, which was done in the August 1996 Budget.
- 1996 – Parliament endorsed the Parliamentary Statement on Racial Tolerance.
- 1997 – the Government announced a new National Multicultural Advisory Council (NMAC).
- 1999 – the Prime Minister launched NMAC's report, "Australian Multiculturalism for a New Century: Towards Inclusiveness".
- December 1999 – in response to the NMAC report, the Government issued its multicultural policy, "A New Agenda for Multicultural Australia", and NMAC was wound up.
- May 2003 – the government released its multicultural policy statement, "Multicultural Australia: United in Diversity". It updated the 1999 new agenda, set strategic directions for 2003–06, and included a commitment to the Council for Multicultural Australia.
- December 2008 – the Australian Multicultural Advisory Council (AMAC) was officially launched.
- April 2010 – AMAC presented its advice and recommendations on cultural diversity policy to government in a statement titled "The People of Australia".
- February 2011 – "The People of Australia – Australia's Multicultural Policy" was launched.
- August 2011 – the Australian Multicultural Council (AMC), replacing the Council for Multicultural Australia (CMA), was officially launched.
- March 2013 – the government announced its response to the recommendations of the Access and Equity Inquiry Panel.
- September 2013 – under new Administrative Arrangements Order, the Prime Minister transferred multicultural affairs from the Immigration portfolio into the new Department of Social Services.
- March 2017 – a new multicultural statement, "Multicultural Australia – united, strong, successful", was launched.

=== Current bodies ===
As of September 2022, Multicultural Affairs is part of the Department of Home Affairs.

The Australian Multicultural Council's term runs from 2022 to 2025. It "is a ministerially appointed body representing a broad cross-section of Australian interests that provides independent and robust advice to Government on multicultural affairs, social cohesion and integration policy and programs".

== Opinions and criticism ==
The earliest academic critics of multiculturalism in Australia were the philosophers Lachlan Chipman and Frank Knopfelmacher, sociologist Tanya Birrell and the political scientist Raymond Sestito. Chipman and Knopfelmacher were concerned with threats to social cohesion, while Birrell's concern was that multiculturalism obscures the social costs associated with large scale immigration that fall most heavily on the most recently arrived and unskilled immigrants. Sestito's arguments were based on the role of political parties. He argued that political parties were instrumental in pursuing multicultural policies, and that these policies would put strain on the political system and would not promote better understanding in the Australian community.

Prime Minister John Curtin supported White Australia policy, saying, "This country shall remain forever the home of the descendants of those people who came here in peace in order to establish in the South Seas an outpost of the British race".

Prime Minister Stanley Bruce was a supporter of the White Australia Policy, and made it an issue in his campaign for the 1925 Australian Federal election.

It is necessary that we should determine what are the ideals towards which every Australian would desire to strive. I think those ideals might well be stated as being to secure our national safety, and to ensure the maintenance of our White Australia Policy to continue as an integral portion of the British Empire. We intend to keep this country white and not allow its people to be faced with the problems that at present are practically insoluble in many parts of the world.

Labor leader H. V. Evatt said in 1945 at the United Nations Conference on International Organization:

You have always insisted on the right to determine the composition of your own people. Australia wants that right now. What you are attempting to do now, Japan attempted after the last war [the First World War] and was prevented by Australia. Had we opened New Guinea and Australia to Japanese immigration then the Pacific War by now might have ended disastrously and we might have had another shambles like that experienced in Malaya.

Historian Geoffrey Blainey achieved mainstream recognition as a critic of multiculturalism when he wrote that multiculturalism threatened to transform Australia into a "cluster of tribes". In his 1984 book All for Australia, Blainey criticised Australian multiculturalism for tending to emphasise the rights of ethnic minorities at the expense of the majority population and for being "anti-British", despite Britons being the largest ethnic group to have migrated to Australia. According to Blainey, such policies created divisions and threatened national cohesion. He argued that "the evidence is clear that many multicultural societies have failed and that the human cost of the failure has been high" and warned that "we should think very carefully about the perils of converting Australia into a giant multicultural laboratory for the assumed benefit of the peoples of the world".

In one of his numerous criticisms of multiculturalism, Blainey wrote:

For the millions of Australians who have no other nation to fall back upon, multiculturalism is almost an insult. It is divisive. It threatens social cohesion. It could, in the long-term, also endanger Australia's military security because it sets up enclaves which in a crisis could appeal to their own homelands for help.

Blainey remained a persistent critic of multiculturalism into the 1990s, denouncing multiculturalism as "morally, intellectually and economically ... a sham."

Historian John Hirst argued that while multiculturalism might serve the needs of ethnic politics and the demands of certain ethnic groups for government funding for the promotion of their separate ethnic identity, it is a perilous concept on which to found national policy. Hirst identified contradictory statements by political leaders that suggested the term was a nonsense concept. These included the policies of Prime Minister Bob Hawke, a proponent of multiculturalism while at the same time promoting a citizenship campaign and stressing the common elements of our culture, and anti-multiculturalism statements by Prime Minister Howard, who aroused the ire of multiculturalists who thought that he was suggesting closing down Italian restaurants and prohibiting the speaking of the Italian language when he proposed no such thing.

According to Hirst, multiculturalism denies the existence of a host Australian culture:

Insofar as multiculturalism makes what it calls 'Anglo-Celts' the equivalent of Italians and Turks, it denies the very notion of a host. [Multiculturalists assert] we are all immigrants of many cultures, contributing to a multicultural society. This may serve the needs of ethnic politics. As a serious historical or sociological analysis it is nonsense. To found policy on it may be perilous.

Critics have argued that multiculturalism was introduced as official policy in Australia without public support or consultation. According to academic Mark Lopez: "Multiculturalism was developed by a small number of academics, social workers and activists, initially located on the fringe of the political arena of immigration, settlement and welfare. The authors responsible for versions of the ideology were also principal actors in the struggle to advance their beliefs and make them government policy". Lopez asserts that through "core groups and activists' sympathisers and contacts ... multiculturalism became government policy ... because the multiculturalists and their supporters were able to influence the ideological content of the Minister's sources of policy ... Contemporary public opinion polls implied ... in the general population, a widespread resentment, or a lack of interest, of the kinds of ideas advanced by multiculturalists. ... The original constituency for multiculturalism was small; popular opinion was an obstacle, not an asset, for the multiculturalists." Furthermore, according to Lopez: "Multiculturalism was not simply picked up and appreciated and implemented by policy makers, government and the major political parties ... [I]n every episode that resulted in the progress of multiculturalism, the effectiveness of the political lobbyists was a decisive factor. ... [Multiculturalism was] tirelessly promoted and manoeuvered forward". However, the above argument have been contested by others, who note that "Government sponsored conferences were in fact held at least once a year from 1950 to discuss immigration issues and to provide information for both government and the Australian public".

Critics associated with the Centre for Population and Urban Research at Monash University argued in 1993 that both right and left factions in the Australian Labor Party have adopted a multicultural stance for the purposes of increasing their support within the party. A manifestation of this embrace of multiculturalism has been the creation of ethnic branches within the Labor Party and ethnic branch stacking.

In 1996, John Howard's Liberal-National Coalition was elected to government. Howard had long been a critic of multiculturalism, releasing his One Australia policy in the late 1980s which called for a reduction in Asian immigration. He later retracted the policy, citing his then position as wrong. Shortly after the Howard government took office, a new independent member of Parliament, Pauline Hanson, made her maiden speech in which she was highly critical of multiculturalism, saying that a multicultural society could never be strong. Hanson went on to form her own political party, One Nation. One Nation campaigned strongly against official multiculturalism, arguing that it represented "a threat to the very basis of the Australian culture, identity and shared values" and that there was "no reason why migrant cultures should be maintained at the expense of our shared, national culture.".

Despite many calls for Howard to censure Hanson, his response was to state that her speech indicated a new freedom of expression in Australia on such issues, and that he believed strongly in freedom of speech. Rather than official multiculturalism, Howard advocated instead the idea of a "shared national identity", albeit one strongly grounded in certain recognisably Anglo-Celtic Australian themes, such as "mateship" and a "fair go". The name of the Department of Immigration, Multiculturalism and Indigenous Affairs was changed to the "Department of Immigration and Citizenship". However, Australia maintained a policy of multiculturalism, and government introduced expanded dual-citizenship rights.

Following the upsurge of support for the One Nation Party in 1996, Lebanese-born Australian anthropologist Ghassan Hage published a critique in 1997 of Australian multiculturalism in the book White Nation. Drawing on theoretical frameworks from Whiteness studies, Jacques Lacan and Pierre Bourdieu, Hage examined a range of everyday discourses that implicated both anti-multiculturalists and pro-multiculturalists alike.

In exploring the discourse of multiculturalism others have argued that the threat to social cohesion and national identity have been overstated. For instance, Ramakrishan (2013) argues that the "largely European" cultural traditions of the population have been maintained despite greater ethnic diversity. Others have asserted that the emphasis on notions such as 'Identity, citizenship, social cohesion and integration' serves more as a catchphrase rather than pragmatic attempts to address the given issues. Some scholars have argued that the persistence of racism in Australian society has been understated; for example, in the journal Sexualities, Jessica Kean writes that "in a nation invested in promoting official policies of ‘multiculturalism’, championing the egalitarian rhetoric of the ‘fair go’, and forgetting colonial violence (or imagining its effects to be a thing of the past), real or projected differences in cultural practices of sex and kinship become an outlet for racism and classism that won’t speak itself plainly."

== Celebrations of multiculturalism ==
A number of projects by government and non-government entities have been established to facilitate multiculturalism in Australia.

The capital, Canberra, developed a tradition of holding the National Multicultural Festival, held over a week in February. It was officially established in 1996.

Harmony Day was established in 1999 by the Howard government, to promote a singular and unifying notion of Australian-ness within multicultural policy.

=== Multicultural awards ===
- The Australian Multicultural Children's Literature Awards were awarded by the Office of Multicultural Affairs from 1991 to 1995, and endorsed by the Children's Book Council of Australia. The award aimed "to encourage themes of cultural diversity and to promote social harmony in books for Australian children". There were three categories of awards: picture book, junior book, and senior book.
- The NSW Multicultural Award has been part of the New South Wales Premier's Literary Awards since 1980, under various names.
- The Governor's Multicultural Award is an award presented by the Governor of South Australia since 2007. There are nine categories of awards.
- The Premier's Multicultural Communications Awards are Australian journalism awards held each year by New South Wales Parliament and Multicultural NSW since 2012.

== See also ==
- Council for Multicultural Australia
- Criticism of multiculturalism
- Cultural sensitivity
- List of non-English-language newspapers in New South Wales
- Multiculturalism in Canada
- Multiculturalism in the United States
- Multiculturalism in the United Kingdom
- Special Broadcasting Service (SBS)
- Far-right politics in Australia
