= Harmony Day =

Australian observance on 21 March

Harmony awareness ribbon

Harmony Day, an event officially expanded and renamed as Harmony Week for its 20th anniversary in 2019, is a government-declared observance celebrated annually on or around 21 March in Australia. It was introduced by the Howard government in 1999, and coincides with the United Nations International Day for the Elimination of Racial Discrimination. The colour orange is associated with the day.

It has been criticised for being purely a celebration of multiculturalism in Australia, with no public acknowledgement of its roots, being a commemoration of the Sharpeville massacre in 1960 in South Africa, nor acknowledgement of the existence of racism in Australia.

== Background ==
On 21 March 1960, police in South Africa gunned down 69 unarmed Black South African people protesting against the pass laws (Note: Black South Africans had to carry a kind of "internal passport" known as a pass, that restricted their freedom of movement and residence in the country.) in an event that became known as the Sharpeville massacre. Six years later, the United Nations created the International Day for the Elimination of Racial Discrimination on that date. This day is commemorated in most of the world apart from Australia, and remembered as a day of mourning in South Africa.

== History ==
The day was introduced by the Howard government in 1999 to promote a singular and unifying notion of "Australian-ness" within multicultural policy. In 1998, Australian Prime Minister John Howard (Liberal–National Coalition) commissioned Eureka Research to begin an anti-racism study to "explore and understand the subtleties and nature of racism in the Australia of the late 1990s, with a view to mounting an effective mass media and/or education anti-racism campaign". Among the conclusions of the study were that there was a need for an anti-racism campaign and a promotion of "living in harmony". According to multiple media reports, the outcomes of the research were not aligned with Howard's views that Australians were not racist. Commenting on the racially motivated 2005 Cronulla riots, he stated: "I do not accept that there is underlying racism in this country".

The Eureka report was suppressed from public access until 2011.

In 2003, the Government of Western Australia renamed the event Harmony Day in that state, always celebrated on the same day: "celebrations from 15 to 20 March, followed by a day of reflection on 21 March".

The event was renamed Harmony Week by the Morrison government for its 20th anniversary in 2019, "to recognise diversity and inclusion activities that take place during the entire week".

== Overview ==
The Department of Home Affairs leads national celebrations for Harmony Week to recognise diversity and inclusion activities that take place during the entire week. Harmony Week is celebrated during the week (Monday to Sunday) that includes 21 March, which is the United Nations International Day for the Elimination of Racial Discrimination. Since 1999, more than 80,000 Harmony Week events have been held in childcare centres, schools, community groups, churches, businesses and federal, state and local government agencies across Australia.

Harmony Day (or Week) in Australia is regarded as a celebration, with few people aware of its origins. It is represented by the colour orange, which "signifies social communication and meaningful conversations... [and] relates to the freedom of ideas and encouragement of mutual respect". The wearing of the colour in the form of clothing or ribbons is encouraged, and community events such as multicultural morning teas are held in schools as a celebration of multiculturalism in Australia, first-generation migrants enjoy receiving recognition of their traditions and culture on this day.

== Calls for change ==
Criticism of Harmony Day has focused on the multicultural aspect of the day and the shift in focus away from anti-racism. Emeritus professor Andrew Jakubowicz was critical of the 13-year governmental suppression of the original Eureka study, and the subsequent lack of research or focus on attempts to eliminate racism. Indigenous critics like Indigenous X CEO and founder Luke Pearson argue that while Harmony Day is perceived as a positive contribution to a multicultural society, the day does little to provide practical solutions to racial discrimination. Academic Christina Ho of the University of Technology Sydney says that Harmony Day does not deal with confronting aspects of racism such as police brutality, Aboriginal deaths in custody, and other forms of discrimination. She said that the choice of the word "harmony" in the name was "intentionally ideological... [by a] very socially conservative government that didn't want to acknowledge racism, didn't want to say sorry to Indigenous people".

Anti-racism groups have highlighted media reports at the time Harmony Day was introduced arguing that the Australian government was not doing enough to eliminate racism. Not-for-profit group All Together Now has questioned why Harmony Day was needed at all if there was no racism in Australia. The Secretary for the New South Wales Fabians, a left-wing think tank, argued that the day dilutes the UN marked event of its intended meaning, and that it avoids discussion of the structural barriers of racial discrimination.

FECCA (Federation of Ethnic Communities' Councils of Australia), the national peak body representing people from culturally and linguistically diverse backgrounds, wants the name changed back to the original one given by the UN – International Day for the Elimination of Racial Discrimination – to open discussion, acknowledge that racism exists, and to focus on all working together to eliminate it, while also celebrating the diversity of cultures that Australia has. In March 2023, Australian Greens senator Mehreen Faruqi wrote to Multicultural Affairs Minister Andrew Giles, saying that the government should revert to the original "name purpose and approach" of the day and that the current celebration "whitewashes this historic and ongoing racism in Australia".

On 21 March 2023, Giles acknowledged the original name of the day on his website, publishing a media release which began "Every year in March, Australians come together to mark Harmony Week, culminating in the observance of the United Nations International Day for the Elimination of Racial Discrimination on the 21st of March".

== See also ==
- Racial Harmony Day, in Singapore
