= Peter Collignon =

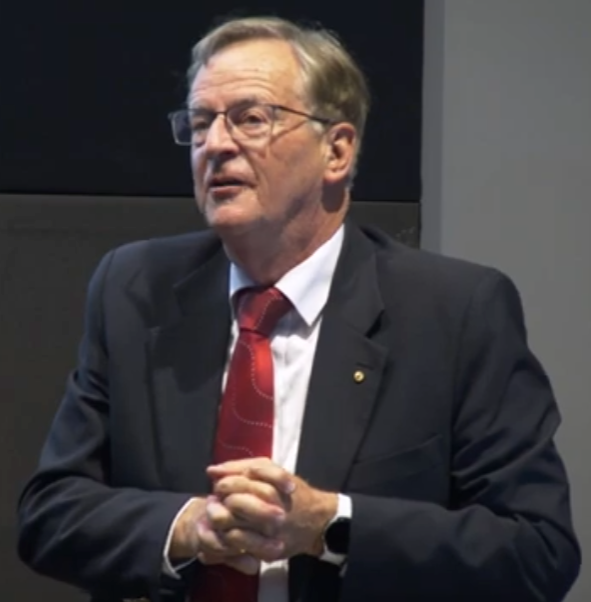
- Giving the ANU Emeritus Faculty Annual Lecture for 2022
- Occupations: Physician, microbiologist

Peter Collignon AM is an Australian infectious diseases physician and microbiologist. He is a professor of microbiology at the Australian National University. Collignon has worked for the World Health Organization, studying the use of antibiotics in food animals, and the rise of drug resistant pathogens. Collignon is director of the Infectious Diseases Unit and Microbiology at the Canberra Hospital, and is a fellow of the Royal College of Pathologists of Australasia.

Collignon has advocated on many public health issues, such as hospital acquired infections of drug resistant pathogens, alarmist media reporting of swine flu outbreaks, and the safety and efficacy of some drugs and vaccines.

In June 2010, he was made a Member of the Order of Australia (AM) in the Queen's Birthday Honours list, for services to medicine, in the fields of clinical microbiology, infectious diseases and infection control.
