= The Co-op Bookshop =

Australian non-profit books retailer

The Co-op
- Type: Non-profit books retailer
- Founded: 1958
- Defunct: 2020
- Headquarters: Sydney, Australia
- Website: coop.com.au

The Co-op was an academic and professional non-profit books retailer in Australia, founded in 1958 before closing in the first half of 2020.

== History ==
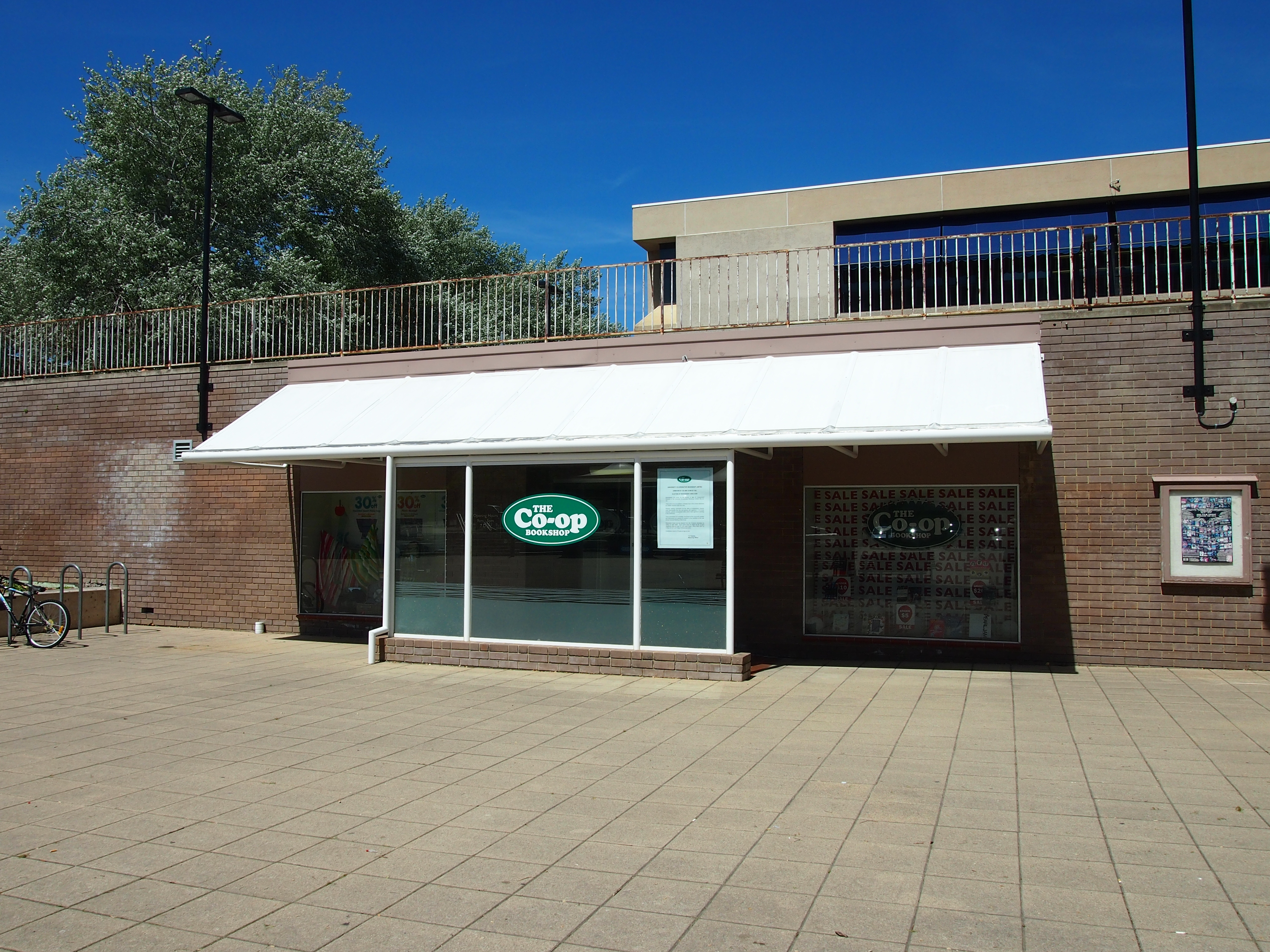
The Australian National University branch of The Co-op

The Co-op was established by students led by the late Malcolm Broun, Celtophile, bibliophile and lawyer, in 1958 at the University of Sydney and grew to become the largest provider of educational, professional and lifelong learning resources in Australia. The Co-op once had over 60 branches across Australia with more than 2 million members.

The company was the largest cooperative in Australia, and the second largest book seller. In 2004 it produced a turnover of $75 million.

In 2013, the company acquired book distributor Central Books Services (since renamed Co Info). In August 2016 the company acquired the Australian Geographic retail chain.

In November 2019 the Co-op Bookshop entered voluntary administration. The appointed administrators confirmed they are investigating payments made to a major supplier, controlled by Co-op chief executive Thorsten Wichtendahl, which received more than $500,000 in advance for goods not yet supplied. The on-line business will be sold to Booktopia with the remaining stores to close in the first half of 2020.

== Criticisms ==
Student activists, former board members and co-op members accused the Co-op of drifting away from the original values of the co-operative movement: democratic-engagement, non-profit and transparency. According to The Canberra Times, in the early 1990s directors with backgrounds in publishing and academia lost a factional battle to accountants who increased directors’ salaries and gradually made it harder for members to participate in board elections.

In 2004, two disenchanted Sydney University Students launched a campaign to elect themselves onto the board to argue for cheaper textbooks and reduced directors’ salaries. They claim the co-op responded by adding more obstacles to student participation, such as moving their AGMs to Hobart, increasing the number of members’ signatures required to call SGMs from 200 to 10,000 and introducing requirements to be elected to the board that students cannot meet. To be elected to the board an individual had to: 1) "demonstrate participation in the management and direction of a medium to large size business of not less than five years in aggregate" and 2) "have graduated from a recognized University...or TAFE degree”.

In 2017, Talal Yassine was board secretary for The Co-op Bookshop, during which a student-led campaign unsuccessfully attempted to remove the board over accusations of corruption, mismanagement, substandard governance, and anti-democratic practices. In October 2016, the Co-op had entered into a consultancy agreement with Yassine Corporation Pty Limited. In the 2020 Voluntary Administrators’ Report prepared by PricewaterhouseCoopers (PwC), the consultancy agreement between the Co-op and Yassine Corporation Pty Limited involved payments of approximately A$726,000 per annum. The report stated that this amount was “in excess of the reasonable costs of obtaining these services from an arm’s length supplier” and described the agreement as “uncommercial.” PwC further noted that the execution of the agreement may constitute a breach of directors’ duty, and that because a relative of Talal Yassine was a director of the Co-op at the time, the agreement may also constitute an unreasonable director-related transaction under section 588FDA of the Corporations Act 2001 (Cth).

In 2016, Chief Executive Officer Thorsten Wichtendahl told student magazine Farrago, “Quite frankly, I wouldn’t want to be reporting to a 21-year-old, first-year uni student. I take my guidance, strategic direction, coaching and mentoring from our board of directors – experienced company directors.”

Media reporting during the Co-op Bookshop and Curious Planet’s financial collapse highlighted concerns among suppliers regarding the company’s payment practices and its relationship with Jacaru Australia, a hat and leather-goods manufacturer. According to The Sydney Morning Herald, unlike many other suppliers who were waiting for overdue payments, Jacaru had received more than $857,000 from the Co-op in the same year, and had reportedly “not appear[ed] to have trouble getting paid.” The report stated that the value of stock supplied to the Co-op over that period was approximately $315,000, indicating that the company had pre-paid for significantly more goods than it had received.SMH article. The same report noted that Thorsten Wichtendahl, the Co-op’s chief executive, held a majority interest in Jacaru - 55% of its shares - through a private company registered to his home address. ASIC documents showed he became a Jacaru director shortly before the first recorded payment from the Co-op to Jacaru in April of that year.
