= Gail Ker =

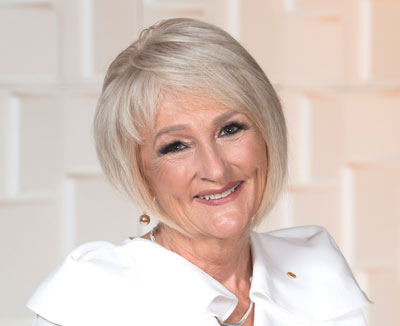
Gail Ker

Gail Kathleen Ker OAM was the chief executive officer of Access Community Services Ltd in Queensland. In 2018, she was named as one of the Queensland Greats by Queensland Premier Annastacia Palaszczuk in a ceremony at the Queensland Art Gallery on 8 June 2018.

In June 2018, Ker launched her 99 Steps to end Domestic Violence program which has provided domestic and family violence counselling and legal support to more than 50 women from culturally and linguistically diverse communities.

Ker was awarded the Medal of the Order of Australia (OAM) in the 2010 Queen's Birthday Honours for "service to the multicultural community of Queensland".
