= Judith Rose Munro =

Australian public administrator

Judith Rose Munro AO
- Occupation: Public administrator
- Known for: Chief Executive Officer of Brisbane City Council (2000–2010); LGBTQ+ advocacy

Judith Rose "Jude" Munro is an Australian public administrator and LGBTQ+ advocate. She served as Chief Executive Officer of Brisbane City Council from 2000 to 2010.

== Career ==
Munro began working in local government in Victoria, including as Chief Executive Officer of the City of St Kilda and the City of Moreland. She then served as Chief Executive Officer of the City of Adelaide, where she was the first woman to hold the position.

In 2000, Munro was appointed Chief Executive Officer of Brisbane City Council. She held the position until 2010. She has also served on a number of boards, including as chair of the Victorian Planning Authority, Newcastle Airport, and Uniting VicTas.

== LGBTQ+ advocacy ==
Munro was involved in the gay liberation movement in Melbourne in the early 1970s while she was a university student. Along with Dennis Altman, she was one of the co-founders of the Melbourne Gay Liberation Front, established at the University of Melbourne in 1972. The movement formed part of a broader wave of activism in Australia advocating for the decriminalisation of homosexuality and greater social acceptance of LGBTQ+ people.

Munro later served as the inaugural chair of the Victorian Pride Centre, a purpose-built facility for LGBTQ+ organisations in Melbourne.

== Honours ==
Munro was appointed an Officer of the Order of Australia (AO) in the 2010 Queen's Birthday Honours for "distinguished service to local government, particularly Brisbane City Council, and to the community through contributions to business, professional development and philanthropic organisations".
