= Alex Wodak =

Australian physician and advocate of drug law reform

Alex Wodak AM
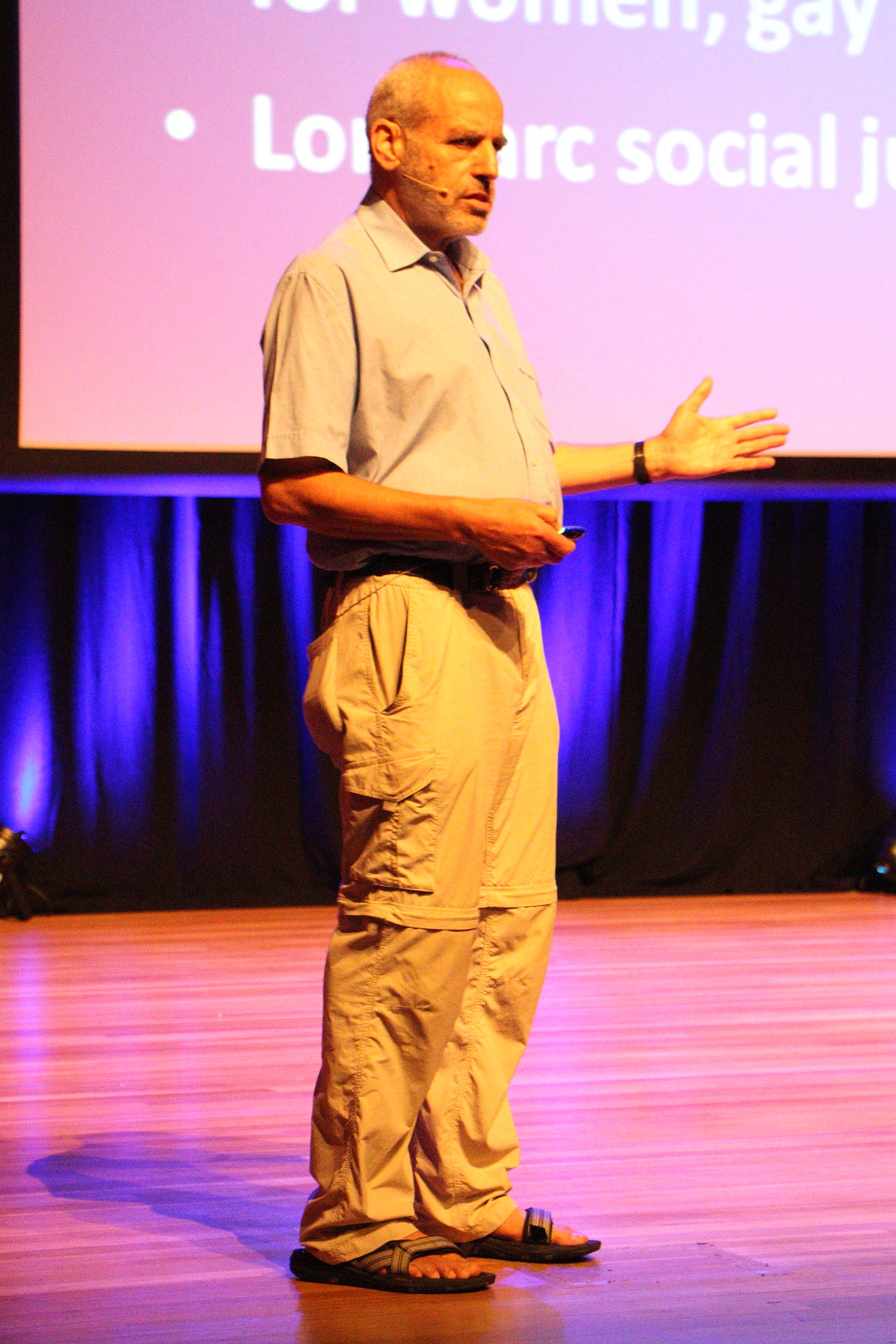
- Dr Alex Wodak speaking on "What comes after drug prohibition?" at the 2014 Australian Skeptics Convention.
- Born: Alexander David Wodak

Alexander David Wodak, AM is a physician and the former director of the Alcohol and Drug Service, at St Vincent's Hospital, in Sydney, Australia.

Wodak is a notable advocate of drug reform laws. Wodak helped establish the National Drug and Alcohol Research Centre, the NSW Users AIDS Association, and the Australian Society of HIV Medicine. Wodak is President of the Australian Drug Law Reform Foundation and was President of the International Harm Reduction Association. Wodak also helped open Australia's first needle exchange programme and the first medically supervised injecting centre in Kings Cross.

A portrait of him by artist Nick Mourtzakis was a 2009 Archibald Prize finalist. In the 2010 Queen's Birthday Honours, he was made a Member of the Order of Australia for "service to medicine and public health, particularly in the area of drug and alcohol dependency treatment, through legislative reform, and to medical education".
