= 2011 Australia Day Honours =

The 2011 Australia Day Honours are appointments to various orders and honours to recognise and reward good works by Australian citizens. The list was announced on 26 January 2011 by the governor general of Australia, Quentin Bryce.

The Australia Day Honours are the first of the two major annual honours lists, the first announced to coincide with Australia Day (26 January), with the other being the Queen's Birthday Honours, which are announced on the second Monday in June.

† indicates an award given posthumously.

== Order of Australia ==
=== Companion (AC) ===
==== General Division ====
Recipient	Citation	Notes
The Honourable Peter Howard Costello	For eminent service to the Parliament of Australia, particularly through the development of landmark economic policy reforms in the areas of taxation, foreign investment, superannuation and corporate regulation, and through representative roles with global financial organisations.	
Her Excellency Penelope Anne Wensley AO	For eminent contribution to the people of Queensland, and to Australia's international relations through senior diplomatic representational roles and as a key contributor to initiatives of the United Nations.	

==== Military Division ====
Branch	Recipient	Citation	Notes
Army	Lieutenant General Kenneth James Gillespie AO DSC CSM	For eminent service to the Australian Defence Force as Vice Chief of the Defence Force/Chief of Joint Operations and Chief of Army.	

=== Officer (AO) ===
==== General Division ====
Recipient	Citation
Michael Lewis Abbott QC	For distinguished service to the visual arts, particularly through leadership roles, to the development of arts education, to Australia-Asia relations, and to the law.
Dr Robyn Gwen Alders	For distinguished service to veterinary science as a researcher and educator, to the maintenance of food security in developing countries through livestock management and disease control programs, and to the Australian poultry industry.
Professor Owen Peter Coaldrake	For distinguished service to higher education, particularly in Queensland, through a range of academic and executive roles, as an advocate for professional standards, to public sector policy management and reform, and to Australia-America relations.
His Excellency John Cecil Dauth LVO	For distinguished service to international relations through the advancement of Australia's diplomatic, trade and cultural relationships, particularly with the United Kingdom and New Zealand, and through contributions to the United Nations.
Dr Mukesh Chandra Haikerwal	For distinguished service to medical administration, to the promotion of public health through leadership roles with professional organisations, particularly the Australian Medical Association, to the reform of the Australian health system through the optimisation of information technology, and as a general practitioner.
Antoinette Kennedy	For distinguished service to the law and to the judiciary, particularly in Western Australia, through major reforms of practices and procedures in the judicial system, to professional associations, as a mentor of women in the law, and to the community.
Stepan Kerkyasharian AM	For distinguished service to the community through leadership and advocacy roles in a range of multicultural and anti-discrimination organisations, to the development and implementation of public policy, and to the promotion of an inclusive society.
The Honourable Anne Levy	For distinguished service to the Parliament of South Australia, as a contributor to social policy reform and through support for the advancement of women, to the performing and visual arts, and to higher education.
The Honourable Allan William McDonald	For distinguished service to the law and to the judiciary, particularly the implementation of mediation initiatives and administrative reforms, and as a mentor, to medical research ethics, and to a range of sporting organisations.
Professor Alexander Cowell McFarlane	For distinguished service to medical research in the field of psychiatry, particularly post-traumatic stress disorders, to veterans' mental health management, and as an author.
Professor Alastair Harvey MacLennan	For distinguished service to medicine as a leading researcher and practitioner in the areas of obstetrics and gynaecology and the causes of cerebral palsy, to medical education, and to professional development.
Professor Anthony John McMichael	For distinguished service to population health, particularly in the area of environmental impact, as an academic and author and through leadership roles with international organisations.
Valerie Pratt AM	For distinguished service to higher education and to the community, particularly as a leader in the area of equal employment opportunity and to industrial relations policy, through significant contributions to boards and advisory committees, and as a mentor and role model.
Dr John William Prineas	For distinguished service to medicine in the field of neurology as an academic, researcher and mentor, to improving the lives of people with multiple sclerosis, and to medical education.
Margaret Grace Thorsborne	For distinguished service to conservation and the environment through advocacy roles for the protection and preservation of wildlife and significant natural heritage sites in Australia, as a supporter of scientific research, and to the Wildlife Preservation Society of Queensland.
Lucy Hughes Turnbull	For distinguished service to the community, particularly through philanthropic contributions to, and fundraising support for, a range of medical, social welfare, educational, youth and cultural organisations, to local government, and to business.

==== Military Division ====
Branch	Recipient	Citation
Army	Major General Paul Vincent Alexander	For distinguished service to Defence in the field of health and, in particular, as the inaugural Commander Joint Health Command.
Army	Major General Aziz Gregory Melick AM RFD	For distinguished service as Commander 8th Brigade, Head of Reserve and Employer Support Division, and as Head of Cadet, Reserve and Employer Support Division, Australian Defence Force.
Air Force	Air Commodore Kenneth Neal Birrer AM	For distinguished service as Head of Special Projects, Workforce Planning Branch, Defence People Strategy and Policy Group, and as Director General Personnel – Air Force.

=== Member (AM) ===
==== General Division ====
Recipient	Citation
Howard Laurie Ainsworth	For service to the media and communications industry as a radio broadcaster and television presenter, to the promotion of the performing arts, and to historical preservation organisations.
Roger William Allen	For service to the information technology sector through leadership roles, venture capital investment and professional development, and as a supporter of the Indigenous community.
John Carlyon Angove	For service to the Australian wine industry, to the promotion of the wine export market, to professional development and research, and to a range of arts, conservation and charitable organisations.
Darryl Lawrence Argall	For service to local government, and to the environment through contributions to land care management and water conservation initiatives.
Professor Ross Eden Babbage	For service to education in the areas of national security and strategic policy studies, as an academic, author and mentor, and through advisory roles on defence matters.
The Honourable Michael Eamon Beahan	For service to the Parliament of Australia, particularly as a Senator for Western Australia, to the promotion of international bi-partisan political debate, to the pharmacy profession, and to the community.
Francis Mark Bethwaite	For service to business and commerce, particularly the mining sector, and to the sport of sailing as a competitor and through contributions to the preservation of Australia's maritime history.
Marion Isabel Blackwell	For service to conservation and the environment, particularly through the Australian Native Plants Society, and to the profession of landscape architecture.
The Honourable William Arthur Blucher	For service to politics, particularly through the Legislative Assembly of Norfolk Island, and to the community.
Lester Fraser Bostock	For service to the Indigenous community, to the broadcast media industry as a presenter and producer, and as an advocate for people with a disability.
Bille Brown	For service to the performing arts as an actor and playwright, and to education.
Andrew George Bruyn	For service to the community of the Northern Territory through executive roles with a range of cultural, tourism, education and charitable organisations, and to the broadcast media industry.
Peter Kenneth Burch BM	For service to the performing arts, particularly chamber music as an administrator, a teacher, and through support for emerging musicians.
Roger Arthur Butler	For service to the visual arts, particularly through curatorial roles with the National Gallery of Australia, as an author, and through the promotion of Australian drawings and printmaking.
Jennifer Ann Cameron	For service to children through the National SIDS Council of Australia, as a supporter of organisations assisting people with a disability, and to the community.
Gary Ogle Cleveland	For service to the visual arts through executive roles, as a mentor of emerging artists, and to the promotion of excellence in design on a national and international level.
Jim Collins	For service to the community through roles with the Bega Valley Advocates for Timor Leste, as a supporter of environment and conservation initiatives, as an innovator within the Bega dairy industry, and to people with a disability.
Dr John Joseph Collins	For service to medicine in the field of paediatric palliative care as a practitioner, academic and researcher, and to professional organisations.
R. Bruce Corlett	For service to the community through business advisory contributions to a range of charitable, medical research and educational organisations.
Barrymore Michael Court	For service to the primary industry sector, particularly through the Pastoralists and Graziers Association of Western Australia, and to environmental management initiatives.
David Joseph Crossin OBE	For service to the law through executive roles with legal professional associations, and to the community, particularly aged care support services.
Professor Anthony John d'Apice	For service to medical research, particularly in the fields of nephrology and immunology, through leadership roles in the development of organ transplantation science, and as an academic and author.
Arthur Joseph Day	For service to medicine as a gynaecologist and administrator, through contributions to ovarian cancer research, and to medical education.
Emeritus Professor Kenneth Raymond Dutton OAM	For service to tertiary education as an administrator and academic and through contributions to the development of international engagement in Australian higher education.
Dr Bruce Kristian Foster	For service to medicine as a paediatric orthopaedic surgeon, to medical research through contributions to the Bone Growth Foundation, and to professional development.
Dr Dominic John Frawley	For service to community health, particularly through executive roles with HeartKids Australia, to medicine as a general practitioner, and to the community.
Graham Andrew Fricker	For service to the building and construction industry through leadership roles with the Australian Institute of Building, to education, and to the community.
Professor Michael Leonard Friedlander	For service to medicine in the field of oncology, as an academic and practitioner, to medical education and research, and through contributions to national and international cancer organisations.
David Robert Gaunt	For service to the arts through the promotion of literature, particularly as a supporter of Australian authors, and to the bookselling and publishing industries.
Clinical Associate Professor Ivan Goldberg	For service to medicine, particularly in the field of ophthalmology, through national and international Glaucoma support organisations, and to education.
The Honourable Graham McDonald Gunn	For service to the Parliament of South Australia, and to the community.
Anthony Patrick Harrington	For service to the community through a range of philanthropic and charitable organisations.
Dr June Marion Heinrich OAM	For service to the Australian Baptist Ministries, particularly in the area of aged and community care, and to a range of health sector organisations.
Kerry Cameron Herron	For service to business in the field of property valuation and to the community.
John Collins Hutchinson	For service to the building and construction sector through executive roles with industry organisations, and to the community.
Diane Margaret James	For service to conservation and the environment, particularly through the development of coastal planning and management in Victoria.
Professor George Jerums	For service to medicine in the field of endocrinology, particularly the clinical management of patients with diabetes, and through a range of professional organisations.
Dr Robert Litchfield Juniper	For service to the visual arts, particularly as an Australian landscape painter and contemporary artist.
Geoffrey Victor Kells	For service to international relations through Opportunity International China, and to aged care, charitable and church organisations.
Professor Andrew Robert Korda	For service to medicine in the fields of obstetrics and gynaecology through clinical, teaching and administrative roles, and to a range of professional organisations.
Ian John Kowalick	For service to the community of South Australia through public sector management, particularly in leadership roles in business and environmental organisations, and to tertiary education and the arts.
Sister Mary Teresa Lawson	For service to education and to the Catholic Church of Australia, particularly through roles supporting children with a hearing impairment and their families.
Associate Professor Marie Madeline Lester	For service to the profession of interior design as a practitioner and educator, and to the promotion of the industry in a range of roles with national and international representative organisations.
Nora Sisley Lewis	For service to the performing arts in the Northern Territory as a composer and director, to the Darwin Chorale, and to music education.
Dr Mark Edward Loane	For service to medicine in the field of ophthalmology, particularly to the Indigenous communities of northern Queensland, and as a contributor to the development of sustainable health services.
Andrew George McCallum	For service to the community in a range of leadership roles in the social justice sector, particularly supporting the welfare of children and their families.
Christine Ann McDiven	For service to the Liberal Party of Australia, and to the community through women's education organisations.
Associate Professor Margaret Joy McGill	For service to community health in the field of diabetes management and education, particularly in support of children and adolescents, and to the establishment of medical education programs in Australia and overseas.
The Honourable Michael John MacKellar	For service to the Parliament of Australia, and to the community through contributions to a range of research and health organisations.
Robert Wolseley Mackenzie	For service to the community, particularly through the surf lifesaving movement.
David John Marshall	For service to the community of the Australian Capital Territory, particularly through the promotion of tourism, and in roles with a range of business, charitable and health organisations.
Paola Kavisha Mazzella	For service to the performing arts as a singer and songwriter, and to the community, through the development of musical projects promoting awareness of multicultural, refugee and Indigenous experiences.
Winthrop Professor Jillian Debora Milroy	For service to the community through the promotion and development of Indigenous education.
Jeffery Dean Mincham	For service to the visual arts as a ceramic artist, to a range of contemporary craft organisations, and to the community of South Australia.
Anthony John Mooney	For service to local government, and to the community of Townsville through a range of tourism, business and infrastructure organisations.
Michael Joseph Mooney	For service to the community of the Northern Territory, particularly through St John Ambulance Australia, and to the real estate sector.
Sidney Hordern Myer	For service to the community through a range of philanthropic, rural development and zoological organisations.
Elke Cordelia Neidhardt	For service to the performing arts as an opera director and producer, and through the tuition and mentoring of young emerging artists.
Professor Louise Kathryn Newman	For service to medicine in the fields of perinatal, child and adolescent mental health, to education, and as an advocate for refugees and asylum seekers.
Mary Nolan	For service to people with acquired brain injuries, particularly as an advocate for age appropriate accommodation.
Maree Suzanne O'Halloran	For service to industrial relations, and to the education sector, through a range of representative roles.
Dr Penelope Diane Olsen	For service to the conservation sciences as an author and researcher, and through the study and documentation of Australian bird species and their history.
Professor Ian Norman Olver	For service to medical oncology as a clinician, researcher, administrator and mentor, and to the community through leadership roles with cancer council organisations.
The Right Reverend Anthony John Parkes	For service to the Anglican Church of Australia, particularly through contributions to the completion of St John's Cathedral, Brisbane.
Adjunct Professor Michael Patkin	For service to medicine as a surgeon, and to the study and practice of ergonomics and instrumental design.
Margaret Claire Piper	For service to the community through leadership and advocacy roles assisting refugees and asylum seekers.
Terence Keith Pitsikas	For service to dentistry, particularly through executive roles with a range of professional organisations, and to education.
Kathy Ragless	For service to the community through roles assisting refugees, asylum seekers and migrants in the Canberra and Goulburn region, and to Companion House.
Zoe Scott Rathus	For service to the law, particularly through contributions to the rights of women, children and the Indigenous community, to education, and to professional organisations.
Professor William David Rawlinson	For service to the medical sciences as a clinician, educator and researcher in the disciplines of virology and pathology.
Michael Anthony Rayner	For service to architecture, particularly through leadership roles in the planning and design of the built environment, and to the community of Queensland.
Hayden Dennis Raysmith	For service to the community through leadership roles in philanthropic, social policy and not-for-profit organisations.
Jill Robb	For service to the Australian film and television industries as a producer, through executive roles with industry organisations, and as a mentor to emerging filmmakers.
Dr James Alastair Robertson	For service to dentistry, and to international humanitarian aid through the delivery of dental health programs in Asia.
Dr Charles Roe	For service to medicine, particularly through contributions to the Australian Medical Association Queensland, and to the community.
Professor Hatem Salem	For service to medicine in the field of haematology as a clinician, educator and researcher and through the establishment of the Australian Centre for Blood Diseases.
Bruce La Rue Sander	For service to education, particularly through the implementation and development of innovative programs supporting youth, and to the community.
Sally Jane Sara	For service to journalism and to the community as a foreign correspondent raising awareness of international issues and as a reporter on rural Australia.
Charles Percy Shuetrim	For service to conservation and the environment through support for marine research, particularly at the Lizard Island Station and the Sydney Institute of Marine Science.
Emeritus Professor John Montague Simmons	For service to engineering and education, particularly through innovative approaches to curriculum reform and the development of the international student market.
Professor Jill Slay	For service to the information technology industry through contributions in the areas of forensic computer science, security, protection of infrastructure and cyber-terrorism.
Emeritus Professor Roger Smalley	For service to the arts as a composer, concert pianist, educator, mentor of emerging musicians and advocate for Australian and international new music.
Dr Anthony David Smith	For service to marine science through research and development of ecosystem based fisheries management, particularly the implementation of harvest strategies and policy governing sustainable practices.
Robert Smorgon	For service to the community through a range of charitable organisations assisting children and medical research groups.
James Christopher Sourris	For service to the arts and to the community through the development of the motion picture industry and through philanthropic contributions, particularly to the Queensland Art Gallery and the State Library of Queensland.
Peter Elliott Spratt	For service to engineering through the conservation of historic buildings, the establishment of an online Building Degree course and through contributions to industry associations.
Professor Roger Peter Strasser	For service to medicine through improving the health care for people living in rural and remote communities in developed and developing nations as an educator, researcher and practitioner.
John Reginald Sullivan†	For service to industrial relations within the steel industry, particularly in the areas of shipping and stevedoring, as an architect of steel industry reforms and contributor to the development of State and Federal government policy.
The Honourable Grant Ernest Tambling	For service to the Parliament of Australia, to the community of Norfolk Island, and to the Northern Territory through contributions to local, State and Federal government.
Dr Charles Teo	For service to medicine as a neurosurgeon through the introduction of minimally invasive techniques, as a researcher, educator and mentor, and through the establishment of the Cure for Life Foundation.
Dr Walter Ross Thompson	For service to medicine as a clinician in anaesthesia and intensive care, through contributions to the development of an educational framework and through executive roles within professional organisations.
Dr Gerard Ronald Vaughan	For service to the arts, particularly as the Director of the National Gallery of Victoria through administration, promotion and development of programs, as a scholar and educator, and as a fundraiser.
Meredith Mirron Walker	For service to heritage conservation through studies for local government and institutions, the development of philosophy and professional standards and the promotion of community participation in heritage identification and management.
Professor Kevin William Wheldall	For service to education as an academic and researcher, particularly in the areas of learning and behavioural difficulties, and through the design and implementation of innovative literacy programs.
Professor Jill Fredryce White	For service to nursing and midwifery through the design and implementation of academic programs, through contributions to government health committees and taskforces, and to professional organisations.
Noel John Whittaker	For service to the community in raising awareness of personal responsibility in matters of superannuation, household budgeting and estate planning, through contributions to government initiatives and tertiary education.
Geoffrey Paul Youdale	For service to civil engineering, particularly in the field of road technology, and to the community through leadership roles with Kidney Health Australia.

==== Military Division ====
Branch	Recipient	Citation
Navy	Chief Petty Officer Ian Richard Gould CSM	For exceptional service to the Royal Australian Navy in the field of Logistics.
Navy	Commander Ivan Michael Ingham	For exceptional service as the Commanding Officer, HMAS Toowoomba, on Operation SLIPPER in the Middle East Area of Operations from June to November 2009.
Navy	Rear Admiral Graeme Spencer Shirley RFD	For exceptional performance of duties as a medical officer in the Royal Australian Navy Reserve.
Navy	Commodore Michael James Uzzell	For exceptional service in the Royal Australian Navy as the Director General Munitions and Director General Major Surface Ships.
Army	Lieutenant Colonel Robert Arthur Barnes	For exceptional service in the field of public affairs for the Australian Defence Force.
Army	Major General Elizabeth Cosson CSC	For exceptional service to the Australian Army and Australian Defence Organisation as Director General Regions and Bases and as Head Defence Support Operations.
Army	Brigadier David Anthony Creagh	For exceptional service as Commander 17th Combat Service Support Brigade, Chief of Staff Headquarters Training Command and Director Logistics – Army.
Army	Brigadier David Shayne Elder	For exceptional service as the Commander 16th Aviation Brigade and to Australian Army Aviation.
Army	Colonel John Malcolm Hutcheson	For exceptional service as Commander of Joint Task Force 635, Commander International Stabilisation Force – Timor Leste and Director of Studies – Land, Australian Command and Staff College.
Army	Lieutenant Colonel David Andrew Thompson	For exceptional service as the Commanding Officer, Combined Task Force 635 on Operation ANODE in the Solomon Islands in 2009 and 2010.
Air Force	Air Commodore Eric Dowse	For exceptional service as Director General Integrated Capacity Development and as Director Enabling Capability – Air Force.
Air Force	Wing Commander Patrick James Keane	For exceptional service in the field of legal support to the Royal Australian Air Force.
Air Force	Squadron Leader Harvey Reynolds	For exceptional service to the ROyal Australian Air Force as the Executive Officer of Number 2 Air Field Defence Squadron and as a Flight Commander at Number 4 Squadron.
Air Force	Air Commodore Stephen Charles Sheedy	For exceptional service as Director General Surveillance and Control and as Director Over the Horizon Radar System Program Office.

=== Medal (OAM) ===
==== General Division ====
Recipient	Citation
Donald Charles Adams	For service to the aviation industry.
Lindsay Alfred Aked†	For service to music as a composer, educator, organist and choirmaster.
Lionel Clarence Allen	For service to the community of Cocos (Keeling) Islands through the preservation and promotion of local history and heritage.
Dr Alan Henry Amodeo	For service to the community, particularly through Telstra Child Flight.
Auriel Andrew	For service to country music as a singer, and to the Indigenous community.
Peter John Andrews	For service to conservation and the environment through the development and promotion of sustainable farming practises.
Adrian John Appo	For service to Indigenous youth in rural and regional Victoria through career planning, employment and training programs.
Robert James Argent	For service to veterans, particularly through the 2/2nd AIF Battalion Association.
Leonard John Ashworth	For service to the print media industry, and to the community of Lithgow.
Donald Walter Astill	For service to the community through a range of veterans, sporting and service organisations.
Marie Anne Bailey	For service to the tourism and hospitality industry, and to the community of Norfolk Island.
Susan Miriam Balint	For service to the community, particularly through the National Council of Jewish Women of Australia.
Joy Balkind	For service to the community through a range of roles with Jewish organisations.
Indra Ban	For service to the Nepalese community.
Brian Francis Barnett	For service to conservation and the environment, particularly Australia's reptile and amphibian species.
William Edward Batley	For service to the community through the Ramsgate Life Saving Club, and to conservation and the environment.
Dr Paul Anthony Bauert	For service to medicine in the field of paediatrics, to Indigenous Health, and through professional organisations.
Terrence Peter Baxter	For service to the community of the Burdekin shire through roles with aged care, veterans, sporting and church organisations.
Robina Beard	For service to the arts, particularly through dance.
Jessie Elaine Bell	For service to music as an organist, and to the community of the Coffs Harbour region.
Sonja Maree Bernhardt	For service to information technology.
Nick Best	For service to Rugby League football as a referee and as an administrator.
Francis Oxmond Bloxham†	For service to the community, particularly through the Parramatta and District Historical Society.
John Patrick Boccanfuso	For service to people with a disability through fundraising roles for The House with No Steps.
William Henry Boyd	For service to the community as a traditional woodcraft artisan, and to conservation.
The Reverend Father Ciril Alojz Bozic	For service to the Slovenian community.
Virginia Margaret Braden	For service to arts administration.
Victor Albert Bradley	For service to veterans and their families, and to the community of Buninyong.
Noeline Briggs-Smith	For service to the Indigenous community of Moree, particularly through the documentation of local and family history.
David Semple Brocklehurst	For service to the community through fundraising roles for children's charitable and medical research organisations.
John William Bronger	For service to the pharmaceutical industry through roles with professional organisations.
Frederick John Brophy	For service to the entertainment industry, and the community of Birdsville.
Barbara McLure Bruce	For service to music as a pianist, teacher and mentor.
Errol Neil Brumpton	For service to the merino wool industry.
Bernard Marcel Brzegowski-Korbman	For service to the community, particularly through the preservation of Jewish history.
Mercia Margaret Buck	For service to the performing arts in the Lake Macquarie and Hunter region, and to local government.
Sister Mary Gemma Burke	For service to the community of the Armidale region, and to the Catholic Church.
Justine Maree Caines	For service to the community, particularly in the area of women's health, maternity care and education.
Alton Ernest Caldersmith	For service to motor sport, particularly historic car racing.
Lillian Calleja	For service to the Maltese community of Victoria.
Ian John Cameron	For service to the viticulture industry in Western Australia.
Helen Rachel Campbell	For service to the law, and to the community of Redfern.
Ian Lindsay Carrig	For service to music through the Adelaide Youth Orchestra.
Graham Dennis Carter	For service to hockey in the Australian Capital Territory.
Lawrence William Carter	For service to the community of Albany.
Robert William Carter	For service to the arts through the documentation, illustration and recording of the history of commercial sailing ships.
Dawn Castree	For service to the community through organisations providing support for people with Alzheimer's and dementia.
John Charles Cauchi-Gera	For service to veterans, particularly through the 2nd Field Ambulance Past Members Association.
Anna Rosa Cavedon	For service to the Italian community of Melbourne.
Christopher Cheung	For service to the community through philanthropic contributions to a range of not-for-profit organisations.
Jean-Christian Cheung	For service to the community through philanthropic contributions to a range of not-for-profit organisations.
David Alexander Christie	For service to veterans and their families, particularly through the Ashfield Sub-Branch of the Returned and Services League of Australia and the Australian Special Air Service Association.
The Very Reverend Father Miltiades John Chryssavgis	For service to the Greek Orthodox Church, and to the community.
John Francis Clark	For service to education in rural and remote areas, particularly through on-line learning initiatives.
Thomas Geoffrey Cleary	For service to the law in New South Wales, and to the community.
David John Clegg†	For service to people with a disability through the Wheelies with Wings program, and to the community.
Lionel Donald Clough	For service to the harness racing industry.
Dr David Henry Clune	For service to librarianship, and to the documentation and preservation of the history of politics, and to the Parliament of New South Wales.
Warren Leslie Cockburn	For service to the community of Kingaroy, and to veterans and their families.
Francis William Cocks	For service to veterans, particularly through the Western Australian Branch of the National Servicemen's Association of Australia.
Tina Colagiuri	For service to the performing arts in New South Wales.
Neville Albert Coleman	For service to conservation and the environment through photographic documentation of Australian marine species.
Wayne Thomas Colley	For service to Rugby League football as a coach, referee and an administrator.
Herbert William Comerford	For service to the community of Queenscliff, particularly through a range of sporting organisations.
Lewis Dale Cooper	For service to cricket in Queensland.
Professor David Leon Copolov	For service to medical research, to professional organisations, and to higher education.
Brian Arthur Corless	For service to education, and to the Anglican Church.
Patricia Keiff Cotton	For service to the community of Bendigo.
Colonel John Charles Coulson RFD ED	For service to the community, particularly through the Army Reserve and ex-service organisations.
Rodney Vincent Coupland	For service to veterans and their families through roles with the Korean War Veterans Recognition Committee and the Huskisson Sub-Branch of the Returned and Services League of Australia.
Malcolm Bruce Coutts	For service to children and their families through the Ronald McDonald House Charities.
Allan Bruce Crouch RFD	For service to the community of Woolgoolga through sporting and service organisations, and to veterans and their families.
Sister Aileen Josephine Crowe	For service to the people of Kiribati as a teacher, and to the Catholic Church.
Jessie Edith Cuffe	For service to the museum and galleries sector of the visual arts, and to the community of the Caboolture region.
Alice Lydia Cullen	For service to softball in Queensland.
Elisabeth Cummings	For service to the visual arts as a painter and teacher, and to conservation and the environment.
Sister Nora Maria Cunningham	For service to the community through a range of health and social welfare organisations, and to the Sisters of Charity.
Elizabeth Anne Davenport	For service to the fashion industry, and to the community.
Angela Kathryn Davis	For service to the community, particularly through the National Council of Jewish Women of Australia.
Stephen Thomas Dean	For service to the community through the development of resuscitation and first aid training.
Terence Kenneth Dean	For service to Australian Rules football.
John Vincent Delahunty	For service to agriculture, and to the community of Murtoa.
Beverley Amy Dew	For service to netball as a player, official and administrator.
Desmond Victor Diggles RFD	For service to surveying and mapping.
Susan Diver	For service to the community through fundraising for Vision Australia.
Professor Ross Kingston Dowling	For service to the hospitality and tourism industry, to education, and to the development of ecotourism.
Barry James Duffus	For service to the community of Nambucca Heads.
Judith Madeline Dunn	For service to the community through the Parramatta and District Historical Society.
Thomas Dyster	For service to the community of the Adelaide Hills region.
Graham Bruce Einfeld	For service to the community, particularly through roles with Jewish education and health care organisations.
Marguerite Lily Eldridge	For service to the community of Stanley, and to the arts.
Richard Anthony Enright	For service to the community of Beaudesert.
Ronald Fife Fallaw†	For service to the community of the Mornington Peninsula, to the arts, and to local government.
Marlene Mary Farrell	For service to the community of Orange, particularly through aged care and social welfare organisations.
Henry John Fay	For service to veterans and their families, and to the community of Bingara.
Max Frank Fiedler	For service to lawn bowls, and to the community.
Eva June Files	For service to the community through fundraising for the Royal Flying Doctor Service of Australia.
Elizabeth Leighton Flint	For service to the community of the Gawler region through women's, church and health care organisations.
John Marshall Flower	For service to the sport of sailing.
Wallace Munro Fordham	For service to the community through a range of aged care and service organisations.
Yvonne Catherine Forrest	For service to the community of Darwin through historical, education and arts organisations.
Kenneth Harold Foster	For service to veterans and their families, particularly through the Vietnam Veterans Association of Australia.
Ian Oliver Francis	For service to the equine industry as a competitor, breeder and trainer.
Professor Ben Freedman	For service to medicine as a clinician, educator and researcher.
Barry Seymour Fry	For service to cricket.
Riad Mohamed Galil	For service to the Islamic community, and to the promotion of interfaith relations.
Elese Maria Gatto	For service to people with a vision impairment.
Guerino Nino Gatto	For service to people with a vision impairment.
Michael Geoffrey George	For service to veterans and their families, and to youth organisations.
Norman James Gibbs	For service to children as an entertainer, and to the community.
Patricia Joy Gillett	For service to the community, particularly through Rotary International.
Louise Mary Gilmore	For service to carers and their families through support and advocacy roles.
Robert Alfred Glanville	For service to the community of Mount Isa.
Robert Sydney Glindemann	For service to the community through Rotary International, and to a range of social welfare, children's and motor sport organisations.
Terence Taylor Gould	For service to the arts in the Port Macquarie region.
John William Goyen	For service to youth through the Scouting movement.
Malcolm Alexander Graham	For service to the community of the Sunshine Coast, and to the trade union movement.
The Reverend Adrian John Gray	For service to the community of Macarthur through church organisations.
Cyril Green	For service to the entertainment industry as a musician and recording artist, and to the community as an ambassador for Indigenous culture.
John Vincent Guy	For service to the community of the Gippsland region, and to local government.
Peter Thomas Hallam	For service to the community through the Sanctuary Australia Foundation.
Susan Mary Hallam	For service to the community through the Sanctuary Australia Foundation.
Russell John Hannah	For service to the arts, particularly through the Illawarra Folk Club, and to the community.
Marion Elva Hardy	For service to the community of Coonabarabran.
Sister Myree Anne Harris	For service to people with mental illness, and to the homeless, through a range of social welfare and church organisations.
Peter Charles Harrison	For service to people with impaired hearing, particularly through Lions International and to the community.
Tania Lee Hayes	For service to carers and their families.
Joyce Arabella Hayman	For service to the community through the Mothers' Union of the Anglican Church.
John Albert Hennington	For service to veterans and their families, particularly through the Finley Sub-Branch of the Returned and Services League of Australia.
Barry John Hirt	For service to industrial relations, and to the community through sporting, health and church organisations.
George Henry Holden	For service to the community through a range of agricultural, environmental and fire service organisations.
Walter Holding	For service to veterans and their families.
Jeanette Lorraine Holland	For service to the community, particularly through Quota International, and to a range of church and service organisations.
Kevin Vincent Hopkins	For service to the community of Dubbo through volunteer roles with social welfare and veterans organisations.
Dorothy Elma Horsman	For service to local government, and to the community of Yass.
Maureen Houssein-Mustafa	For service to vocational education and training, and to the community.
Merron Jean Howard	For service to the community through roles with the Centre for Children's Cancer and Blood Disorders at the Sydney Children's Hospital.
Malcolm Ronald Hughes	For service to veterans and their families through the Western Australian State Section of the Naval Association of Australia.
Dr Millicent Anne Hughes	For service to the community through a range of women's, service and sporting organisations.
William James Humphreys	For service to veterans and their families through the New South Wales Branch of the Returned and Services League of Australia.
Ronald Alexander Hunt	For service to local government, and to the community of Tully.
Christopher Francis Hurley	For service to veterans and their families.
Yvonne Patricia Hutton	For service to local government, and to the community of Parkes.
Dr Bernard Ralston Huxtable	For service to medicine, and to the community of Orange through a range of disability, service and arts organisations.
Chris Jacobsen	For service to the community, particularly through the Mount Kembla Rural Fire Brigade.
John Edward Jenkins	For service to local government, and to the community of the Lake Macquarie region.
John Phillip Jewell	For service to the community of north Queensland through a range of emergency service organisations.
The Reverend Ivan John Jordan	For service to the Indigenous community of the Northern Territory, and to the Australian Baptist Missionary Society.
Verl Alice Jordan	For service to the Indigenous community of the Northern Territory, and to the Australian Baptist Missionary Society.
Leslie Fay Jorgensen	For service to the community of Toowoomba.
Emeritus Professor Kenneth Vincent Jubb	For service to veterinary science and pathology.
Lindsay Allan Juniper	For service to the energy sector through the development of new technologies for efficient power generation.
Katherine Ann Kaplan	For service to women through support for victims of domestic violence, and to the Jewish community.
Kon Karapanagiotidis	For service to the community through refugee assistance organisations.
Michael Keenan	For service to the citrus industry.
Sister Mary Teresa Kelly	For service to nursing, particularly in the field of stomal therapy, and to the development of palliative care support in the Bunbury region.
Sister Eileen Mary Kennedy	For service to the people of Kiribati as a teacher, through support for social welfare groups, and to the Catholic Church.
Margaret Janice Kennedy	For service to the community through support for health, social welfare and service organisations.
Eric Arnold Keygan	For service to veterans and their families.
John Clifton Kilborn	For service to cricket in New South Wales.
James Anthony Killen	For service to the community, particularly to St Vincent's Health Victoria.
Zara Margaret Kimpton	For service to international relations through executive roles with the Australian Institute of International Affairs Victoria.
Carlene Faye King	For service to the community, particularly through Lions International.
John Kenneth King	For service to the tourism industry through executive roles with a range of marketing and professional bodies.
Stephen Kenneth King	For service to the community of Gunnedah.
Stephen Niall King	For service to the community of Strathfield.
Cheryl Joy Kinnane	For service to hockey in the Grafton region.
Tom Walter Kirsop	For service to conservation and the environment through the Surfrider Foundation Australia.
Douglas Robert Knuckey	For service to youth through the Operation Flinders Foundation.
Kathleen Winifred Lancaster	For service to the community through the Australian Red Cross.
Lorraine May Landon	For service to basketball through a range of managerial and administrative roles.
Kay Valmai Lane	For service to women's golf and sports administration.
Ramon Lawrence	For service to martial arts.
Patricia Isobel Lawson	For service to the community, particularly through Zonta International.
Air Commodore Mark Roger Lax CSM	For service to the community through the research, documentation and recording of Australia's military history.
Cecilia Drysdale Leary	For service to nursing, particularly in the area of day surgery.
The Reverend Everard Leske†	For service to the Lutheran Church of Australia, particularly through publishing.
Jennifer Fay Liney	For service to conservation and the environment, particularly through the Eurobodalla Region Botanical Gardens.
Charles Edward Lloyd-Jones	For service to the community of Port Macquarie, and to The Salvation Army.
Denis Richard Loaney	For service to children, particularly through the Abused Child Trust.
Heather Julie Locke	For service to the arts in the Margaret River region.
Betty Rose Lowe	For service to the community through the Lake Munmorah Senior Citizens' Club.
Margaret Ruth Lucas	For service to dance as a teacher and administrator.
Gregory John Lupton	For service to the community through a range of sporting, aged care and education organisations.
Jolanta Lusis	For service to the Baltic communities of South Australia.
Peter Lynn	For service to the community through the Uniting Church in Australia.
Susan McLeod McCulloch	For service to the arts as a writer and publisher.
John Kenny McDonald	For service to the cattle industry, and to the community of the Tweed River region.
Margaret MacDonald	For service to conservation and environment in the Eastern Otway region.
John Alister McDougall	For service to lawn bowls, and to the community.
The Reverend Father Peter Martin McGrath	For service to the community through the Catholic Church.
Edna Jane McKenzie†	For service to the arts as a painter.
Gwenyth Zena MacLennan	For service to the community through Torchbearers for Legacy NSW.
Jennifer Judith Macintosh	For service to the community through the Embroiderers' Guild of South Australia, and to the Guiding movement.
John Hamilton Macknight	For service to the aviation industry, and to the community.
Judith Ann Macourt	For service to swimming, and to the community.
Michael Francis Maher	For service to children with cancer and their families.
Peter Lawrent Maher	For service to the community through the St Vincent de Paul Society.
Dr Barbara York Main	For service to science and conservation as a researcher and educator in the field of arachnology, and to the community of Western Australia.
Brian Kenneth Malligan	For service to youth through the Scouting movement, and to the community.
Albert Anthony Manning	For service to the community of Tumut, particularly through Lions International.
Joe Mannix	For service to the community through advocacy roles with a range of disability and social welfare organisations.
Clelia Zita March-Doeve	For service to international relations through the promotion of Australian culture in Italy.
Betty Margaret Marsden	For service to conservation and the environment, and to the community of the Dandenong Ranges region.
Chloris Muriel Martin	For service to the community of George Town through historical, business and service organisations.
Kevin Douglas Martin	For service to the community, particularly through surf lifesaving, sporting and local government organisations.
Terence Godfrey Matthews	For service to the community of Devonport.
Barbara Christine May	For service to veterans and their families, and to the community of the Illawarra region.
Noela Elizabeth Medcalf	For service to the Guiding movement, and to swimming.
Dr Ian James Mitchell	For service to education.
Graeme Noel Moor	For service to the Scouting movement.
Margaret Evelyn Moore	For service to the arts through music education.
Faye Moran	For service to the community, particularly people living with Parkinson's disease, their families and carers.
Kenneth William Morgan	For service to young people and their families, particularly through the Kids Under Cover program.
Aileen Mary Morris	For service to the Catholic Church, and to aged persons.
Cecil Robert Morris	For service to the community, particularly through the Korean War Veterans Recognition Committee.
Valerie Joan Myors	For service to the community through a range of health, social welfare and women's organisations.
Lieutenant Colonel Maxwell Arget Neal	For service to youth, particularly through the Australian Army Cadets.
Gerard Joseph Neesham	For service to Indigenous youth, and to Australian Rules football.
Edward Ranald Newbery BEM	For service to the community of the Moree district.
Maxwell Amey Newcombe	For service to the community of Tamworth.
Rhonda Maree Obad	For service to youth through the Bridge Back to Life Foundation.
Narelle Doris Ober	For service to the community through a range of service organisations.
Garnet Thomas O'Connell	For service to Australian Rules football, and to the community of Osborne.
Ian Eric Oelrichs	For service to the tourism industry, particularly through education, and to regional development.
Rodger Gregory O'Hara	For service to youth through the Scouting movement, and to the community.
Patricia Okon	For service to the community of Lithgow through women's and social welfare groups.
Douglas Oliver	For service to youth through the Royal Australian Air Force Cadets.
Alice Arnott Oppen	For service to the community through a range of roles with heritage, women's and charitable organisations.
Matthew Joseph O'Riley	For service to education through the provision of teaching programs to Indigenous communities.
Dr John Francis Oswald	For service to medicine as an anaesthetist, and to the community.
Ian Richard Parmenter	For service to the food and tourism industries as an event director, author, journalist and broadcaster.
Bruce Parsons	For service to the community of Forster-Tuncurry.
Barbara Paterson	For service to the community as a foster carer.
Robert Wilson Paterson RFD	For service to the community as a foster carer.
Florence Catherine Payne	For service to the community through the surf lifesaving movement, and to veterans and their families.
Lindsay Oswald Payne	For service to the community, particularly through Lions Clubs International and freemasonry.
Aldo Perilli	For service to the community through a range of sporting organisations.
Douglas Peters	For service to the entertainment industry as a musician and recording artist, and as an ambassador for Indigenous culture.
Bryan D'Arcy Phelan	For service to cricket at the local and national level.
Dr John Andrew Pickering	For service to medicine, particularly in rural and regional areas, and to the Indigenous community.
Councillor William Pickering	For service to local government, to youth, and to the community.
Richard John Pietsch	For service to the community through roles with a range of local government, transport, agricultural and church organisations.
Eduard Johannes Planken	For service to the Australian Honey Bee industry.
Brian Charles Prangnell	For service to the community through church, youth, sporting and ex-service organisations.
Elma Margaret Proellocks	For service to the community of Toowoomba through senior citizens' organisations.
John Walter Pugh	For service to the community through social justice organisations, and to the Uniting Church.
Margaret Mary Pugh	For service to the community through social justice organisations, and to the Uniting Church.
Carl Gray Rackemann	For service to cricket as an administrator, coach and player, and to the community.
Aladin Rahemtula	For service to librarianship through the Supreme Court of Queensland, and to the community through the preservation of legal heritage.
Nola May Randall-Mohk	For service to multicultural relations, particularly through roles with Cambodian and Khmer associations.
John Warwick Rawson	For service to the community, particularly through philanthropic support for the Hope Street Urban Compassion program.
Anthony John Reade	For service to the community, particularly through Toc H Australia, Rotary International and local government.
James Godfrey Rebgetz	For service to the community, particularly through All Souls St Gabriel's School.
Gwenda Rees	For service to music as a pianist and educator, and to the community.
David Donald Reid	For service to conservation and the environment, particularly through natural resource and management roles.
Margaret Anne Reidy	For service to the environment, particularly through Friends of Lane Cove National Park.
Ashley Kenneth Rewald	For service to the community, particularly through the Apex Club of Murgon.
Mary Boswell Reynolds	For service to the community through a range of historical, environmental and charitable organisations.
Kathleen Isabel Rhodes†	For service to veterans and their families, particularly through the War Widows' Guild of Australia.
Helen Mavis Richards	For service to horticulture through the cultivation and propagation of orchids.
Dr John Michael Ridley	For service to medicine as a general practitioner, and to the community of Coffs Harbour.
Alexander Burnside Robertson	For service to the community, particularly through fundraising activities supporting The Northern Hospital.
Ross Douglas Rogers	For service to the community of the Kalgoorlie region.
Jocelyn Clare Ross	For service to the community, and to education as a teacher of young people with a hearing impairment.
The Reverend William Arthur Ross	For service to the Anglican Church of Australia, and to the community of Port Hedland.
Dr Spencer James Routh	For service to the library and information sciences sector, particularly through the University of Queensland.
Laurence Edward Rowe	For service to the community of Gunnedah through the Brass Band movement.
Shirley Anne Rundell	For service to the community of Huskisson.
Rex Gerhard Ruwoldt	For service to the community through the Darwin Defenders 1942–45 Inc.
Dean Ryder	For service to veterans and their families through the Port Pirie Sub-Branch of the Returned and Services League of Australia.
Robert James Salt	For service to conservation and the environment through a range of organisations in the North Sydney region.
Ramdas Sankaran	For service to multiculturalism, and to the community of Western Australia.
June Grierson Schaeffer	For service to the community, particularly through the Brain Foundation, and to local government.
Eric Kurt Schick	For service to quantity surveying, and to dispute resolution and arbitration.
Bruce Burdon Scott	For service to veterans and their families through the Scottsdale Sub-Branch of the Returned and Services League of Australia, and to the community.
Siva Selvakulalingam	For service to the community through the Hindu Society of South Australia.
Dr Rosalie Jean Shaw PSM	For service to medicine, particularly through the Asia-Pacific Hospice Palliative Care Network.
William Francis Shaw	For service to music through the Adelaide Male Voice Choir.
Dr Stephen Peter Shumack	For service to medicine in the field of dermatology, and to the community.
Michael John Silver	For service to cricket as an administrator.
Bruce Forbes Simpson	For service to the preservation and promotion of the history of Drovers in Australia as a researcher and author, and to the community.
Dr Laurence Simpson	For service to medicine as a clinician and educator.
Patricia Slattery	For service to the community through a range of social welfare and church organisations.
Lynette May Smith	For service to the community, particularly to people with Parkinson's disease.
Professor Gregory Ian Snell	For service to medicine in the field of respiratory science, to education, and to professional organisations.
Anthony Burton Stafford	For service to international relations in the Solomon Islands, and to the community.
Peter Stapleton	For service to the community of Queanbeyan.
Leigh Murray Stewart	For service to the community through a range of fundraising projects.
Dr Christina Stewens Albrecht	For service to the community through the Australian-German Welfare Society.
Ronald Edward Store	For service to library and information services, and to education.
Dr Francis Patrick Sullivan	For service to medicine in the field of ophthalmology.
Sister Margaret Mary Sullivan	For service to the international community of Kiribati through the provision of education and support services.
Alma Joan Tate	For service to the community in the Newcastle region.
Judith Lorraine Terkelsen	For service to children and their families in the Tweed Valley region.
Dr Ramaswamy Thangavelu	For service to the community of Crookwell, and as a medical practitioner.
Eric Oswald Thorburn	For service to cricket, and to the community of Cootamundra.
Raymond John Thorburn	For service to the community of Kiama, particularly through the preservation of local history.
Neil Leonard Tieman	For service to the transport manufacturing industry in Australia.
Alan Phillip Toohey	For service to the community, and to the education of children in rural and regional areas.
Quan Van Tran	For service to the Australian-Vietnamese community.
Kenneth Oliver Triggs	For service to veterans and their families through the Returned and Services League of Australia.
Antonio Trivisonno	For service to senior citizens in the Camberwell community.
Sam Ure-Smith	For service to the development and promotion of art publishing in Australia.
Janet Urquhart	For service to veterans and their families through Women's Auxiliaries of the Returned and Services League of Australia.
Joan Florence Urquhart	For service to the community of Beaudesert.
Associate Professor Marianne Vonau	For service to medicine in the field of neurosurgery as a clinician, educator and mentor.
Barry Hugh Wakelin	For service to the Parliament of Australia, and to rural and regional areas.
John Patrick Walsh BEM†	For service to the sport of cycling.
Margaret Helene Walsh	For service to people with disabilities, particularly through the Valued Independent People organisation.
Maxwell John Walters	For service to cricket, and to the community of Queensland.
Associate Professor Orli Wargon	For service to medicine as a clinician, researcher and educator, and to the community through arts and charitable organisations.
Raymond Alan Welsford	For service to the community of Warrnambool through a range of education, local government and service organisations.
Walter John Williamson	For service to swimming, and to the community of Maroubra.
Bruce Robert Wilson	For service to local government, and to the community of Shepparton.
Gregory Robert Wilson	For service to the community through advocacy roles for people with mental health issues, and to the arts.
Maurice John Wilson	For service to the Scouting movement, and to the community of Bundaberg.
Roger Baden Wood	For service to radio broadcasting, and to the community of the Richmond Valley.
Bryan Thomas Woodford	For service to people with a disability through a range of executive roles.
Francis Ross Woodhams ED	For service to veterans and their families through a range of ex-service organisations.
Judith Helen Worrall	For service to people with a disability, and to the community through a range of social welfare, health and charitable organisations.
Ted Worthington	For service to charity through Bereavement Assistance Limited, and to the community.
Margaret Helen Wright	For service to the community through music and education organisations.
Richard Watsford Yaxley	For service to education, literature and the performing arts.
June Young	For service to the community through a range of women's, local government, business and ex-service organisations.
Dr Anthony Michael Zahra	For service to dentistry, and to the community.

==== Military Division ====
Branch	Recipient	Citation
Navy	Chief Petty Officer Ricky Andrew Somer	For meritorious service in the field of personnel management in the Royal Australian Navy.
Navy	Lieutenant Benjamin William Stock	For meritorious service in the fields of Submarine Medicine and Submarine Escape and Rescue.
Navy	Lieutenant Commander Rudolf Francisco Wagemaker	For meritorious service in the field of Marine Engineering and Combat Survivability.
Army	Warrant Officer Class One Greggery Stephen Burns	For meritorious service as Regimental Sergeant Major of 5th Battalion, the Royal Australian Regiment (Mechanised), on operations and the Royal Military College, Duntroon.
Army	Warrant Officer Class One Mark Antony Campbell	For meritorious service as Regimental Sergeant Major of 1st Health Support Battalion and the 3rd Combat Service Support Battalion, and as the Senior Instructor for the Warrant Officer and Non-Commissioned Officer Academy, North Queensland Wing.
Army	Captain F—	For meritorious service while serving in key roles with the Regiment.
Army	Warrant Officer Class One Gary John Mychael CSM	For meritorious service as the Regimental Sergeant Major of the 5th Brigade from 2007 to 2008 and the 2nd Division from 2009 to 2010.
Army	Warrant Officer Class One Simon Richard Renfrey	For meritorious service as a Bandmaster and Band Sergeant Major.
Air Force	Wing Commander David Mark Scheul	For meritorious service as a professional design engineer and project manager on the Armed Reconnaissance and Multi-Role Helicopter Projects.

== Meritorious Service ==
=== Public Service Medal (PSM) ===
Branch	Recipient	Citation
Aust.	His Excellency Matthew John Anderson	For outstanding public service in leading the Australian Government's consular and humanitarian response to the 2009 tsunami in Samoa.
Aust.	Roy Bird	For outstanding public service in leading the development of engineering protection solutions to improve the survivability of Australian Defence Force personnel operating in lightly armoured and soft-skinned military vehicles.
Aust.	Kristine Anne Cala	For outstanding public service as Counsellor (Immigration) and Principal Migration Officer in the Department of Immigration and Citizenship's New Delhi office.
Aust.	Lisa Maree Crawford	For outstanding public service in contributing to the efforts of the Australian High Commission in Sri Lanka.
Aust.	Dr Gordon John de Brouwer	For outstanding public service in the development of international economic policy, particularly in the formation of the Australian Government's agenda to establish the G20 as the pre-eminent global economic forum.
Aust.	Dr Jason Paul Gulbin	For outstanding public service in the development and implementation of the Australian Sports Commission's National Talent Identification Development Program.
Aust.	Brendan Edward Hower	For outstanding public service in establishing and managing the operational requirements for modernising Australia's national industrial awards.
Aust.	Dr Alan Lynton Jaques	For outstanding public service in leading the development of a comprehensive and integrated scientific and economic assessment of Australia's energy resources: Australia's Energy Resource Assessment.
Aust.	Erica Maree Lauchland	For outstanding public service in leading the successful implementation of high quality, cost effective automated testing of Medicare Australia's business systems.
Aust.	Geoffrey James Leeper	For outstanding public service in the development and implementation of major reforms to housing policy in Australia.
Aust.	Frank Anthony Leverett CVO	For outstanding public service in the successful organisation of Prime Ministerial visits abroad, visits to Australia by Heads of Government and Heads of State, and major ceremonial occasions and events.
Aust.	Janette Lesley McInnies	For outstanding public service in providing high level receptionist and information services to stakeholders of the Australian National Maritime Museum.
Aust.	James Andrew Murphy	For outstanding public service in developing public policy which delivered world's best practice standards of corporate governance and financial system regulation, and in advising the Australian Government on its response to the 2008 financial crisis.
Aust.	Delia Ann Rickard	For outstanding public service in the development of consumer protection for financial services.
Aust.	Christine Dorothy Silk	For outstanding public service in implementing a complex unified certified agreement for the Department of Education, Employment and Workplace Relations.
Aust.	Catherine Eve Walker	For outstanding public service in leading Australia's efforts in relation to humanitarian aid and development assistance.
NSW	Stephen Phillip Allen	For outstanding public service, particularly to the NSW Department of Environment, Climate Change and Water.
NSW	Tina Sylvia Baines	For outstanding public service to the Community Engagement and Events Division within the NSW Department of Premier and Cabinet.
NSW	James Patrick Cox	For outstanding public service to the NSW Independent Pricing and Regulatory Tribunal.
NSW	Michael Cullen	For outstanding public service to small business and regional economic development in New South Wales.
NSW	Craig Francis Deasey	For outstanding public service to the Dungog Shire communities.
NSW	Derek Michael Everson	For outstanding public service to water management in rural and regional New South Wales.
NSW	John Leslie Horsfall RFD ED	For outstanding public service to consumer protection through the regulation of the residential building industry in New South Wales.
NSW	Therese Marie Manning	For outstanding public service as an Ecological Risk Specialist within the NSW Department of Environment, Climate Change and Water.
NSW	Barry John Orr	For outstanding public service to water management in the Lachlan Valley region.
NSW	Margaret Raffan	For outstanding public service to the regulation of the consumer credit industry.
NSW	Trevor Frederick Rice	For outstanding public service, particularly to the Blairmount Public School.
NSW	Paul Vevers	For outstanding public service to Housing NSW.
Vic.	Professor Christopher William Brook	For outstanding public service in leading improvements in the Victorian and broader Australian health systems in areas including quality and safety of patient outcomes, national blood supply, public health, and rural and regional health services.
Vic.	Jacqueline Michelle Hickey	For outstanding public service in the regional coordination and orderly evacuation of residential health and aged care facilities during bushfire seasons.
Vic.	Janice Margaret Shuard	For outstanding public service in the delivery and management of correctional services.
Vic.	Lance Wallace	For outstanding public service in driving significant improvement in the quality, effectiveness and efficiency of Victorian health and human services.
Qld	Dr Patrick Joseph Blackall	For outstanding public service to Queensland's primary industries and science through innovative research into the bacterial diseases of poultry, pigs and cattle.
Qld	Peter Matthew Drew	For outstanding public service as Queensland Parliamentary Counsel.
Qld	Professor David Wayne Johnson	For outstanding public service to Queensland Health, particularly to research into the early detection and management of chronic kidney disease.
Qld	Barry John Nutter	For outstanding public service to education and training in Queensland, particularly as Chair of the Training and Employment Recognition Council.
Qld	Dr John Gregory Wakefield	For outstanding public service to Queensland Health, particularly in the areas of patient safety and high quality service delivery.
Qld	Gordon Forrest Webley	For outstanding public service in local government, particularly to the communities of the Isaac region of Queensland.
WA	Michael James Laughton-Smith	For outstanding public service in the development and implementation of improved and sustainable electricity supplies to a number of Indigenous communities in the Pilbara and Kimberley regions of Western Australia.
WA	Barry Andrew Sargeant	For outstanding public service in Western Australia, particularly as Director General, Department of Racing, Gaming and Liquor.
SA	Sharon May Broadbent	For outstanding public service in the area of education in disadvantaged areas.
SA	Christopher Andrew Dearman	For outstanding public service in the area of security and emergency management.
SA	Professor Robert Keer Lewis	For outstanding public service in the area of primary industries research and development.
Tas.	Mary Jean Bent	For outstanding public service particularly to public health and human services in Tasmania.
Tas.	Dr Anthony Vincent Brown	For outstanding public service as a leader in the application of information technology and innovation to Tasmania's mining industry.
ACT	Khalid Zaheer Ahmed	For outstanding public service in the development of fiscal policy and financial management strategy.
ACT	Peter Frank Kowald	For outstanding public service to the ACT Vocational Education and Training sector.
ACT	Jan Maree Marshall	For outstanding public service in the development of the CC Cares Program conducted by the Canberra College.
NT	Sandra Joy McCue	For outstanding public service to education in the Northern Territory.
NT	Glenn Mitchell Wightman	For outstanding public service to the maintenance of Indigenous languages and culture in the Northern Territory, particularly Indigenous biological knowledge of plants, animals and landscapes.

=== Australian Police Medal (APM) ===
Branch	Recipient
Australian Federal Police	Assistant Commissioner Rudi William Lammers
Australian Federal Police	Assistant Commissioner Roman Alexander Quaedvlieg
New South Wales Police	Inspector Anne Katherine Clarke
New South Wales Police	Chief Superintendent Stephen John Cullen
New South Wales Police	Detective Superintendent Malcolm Arthur Lanyon
New South Wales Police	Sergeant Peter Gerard Lonergan
New South Wales Police	Inspector Nada McDonald
New South Wales Police	Superintendent Stuart Geoffrey Smith
New South Wales Police	Superintendent David Edwin Swilks
New South Wales Police	Detective Superintendent Deborah Wallace
Victoria Police	Superintendent Peter Bull
Victoria Police	Assistant Commissioner Emmett Mark Dunne
Victoria Police	Inspector Douglas John Hocking
Victoria Police	Leading Senior Constable John Gerard Kissane
Victoria Police	Detective Superintendent Gerard Joseph Ryan
Victoria Police	Inspector Michael Graham Talbot
Queensland Police	Sergeant Cheryl Frances Bodley
Queensland Police	Sergeant Geoffrey William Bodley
Queensland Police	Inspector Graham Leslie Coleman
Queensland Police	Superintendent Garth Stuart Pitman
Queensland Police	Superintendent Patrick John Ryan
Queensland Police	Detective Sergeant Graham Walker
Western Australia Police	Assistant Commissioner Nicholas Andrew Anticich
Western Australia Police	Brevet Senior Sergeant Jane Marie Gillham
Western Australia Police	Superintendent Ross Wayne Tomasini
South Australia Police	Detective Senior Sergeant Kevin Charles Jenkins
South Australia Police	Sergeant Susan Jane Lock
South Australia Police	Superintendent Ferdinand Walter Pit
Tasmania Police	Commander Lauchland Bruce Avery
Tasmania Police	Commander Richard Cowling
Northern Territory Police	Detective Senior Constable Alan Joseph Hodge
Northern Territory Police	Detective Sergeant Mark Antony Stringer

=== Australian Fire Service Medal (AFSM) ===
Branch	Recipient
Federal Fire Service	Harvey Noel Bradburn
New South Wales Fire Service	Major Carol Anne Anderson
New South Wales Fire Service	Scott Andrew Beers
New South Wales Fire Service	Leonard John Best
New South Wales Fire Service	Ken Oliver Chalker
New South Wales Fire Service	Neil Eric Harris
New South Wales Fire Service	Bruce Neil McDonald
New South Wales Fire Service	William John Muirhead
New South Wales Fire Service	Bruce Guthrie Noble
New South Wales Fire Service	Douglas John Pearce
New South Wales Fire Service	Doreen Peters
New South Wales Fire Service	Edward Thomas Ranse
Victoria Fire Service	Alexander Gerard de Man
Victoria Fire Service	Murray John Fullerton
Victoria Fire Service	Andrew Ewart Graystone
Victoria Fire Service	John Paul Hale
Victoria Fire Service	Adrian Michael Hem
Victoria Fire Service	Paul Steward Illman
Victoria Fire Service	Robert James Ipsen
Victoria Fire Service	Robert Henry Rankin
Queensland Fire Service	Kevin Hilton Anderson
Queensland Fire Service	Neil Ronald Gallant
Queensland Fire Service	James Richard Runham SC OAM
Western Australia Fire Service	Thomas Brown
Western Australia Fire Service	Rodney Francis Eyre
Western Australia Fire Service	Craig Anthony Hynes
Western Australia Fire Service	Terrence James Maher
South Australia Fire Service	Robert John Crockford
South Australia Fire Service	Darryl James Horsell
South Australia Fire Service	Mervyn John Robinson
South Australia Fire Service	Gerald Anthony Thomson
Tasmania Fire Service	Gavin Stuart Freeman
Tasmania Fire Service	Kevin Raymond Hardwick
Tasmania Fire Service	William John Tiddy
Northern Territory Fire Service	Patrick John Skewes

=== Ambulance Service Medal (ASM) ===
Branch	Recipient
New South Wales Ambulance Service	Graeme Ralph Field
New South Wales Ambulance Service	Graeme Trevor Willis
Victoria Ambulance Service	John Stewart Davis
Victoria Ambulance Service	Terry Houge
Victoria Ambulance Service	John Bernard McKenzie
Victoria Ambulance Service	Casey Michelle Nunn
Victoria Ambulance Service	Neil Vincent Trease
Queensland Ambulance Service	Rodney Samuel Sheather
Queensland Ambulance Service	Deanne Maree Taylor-Dutton
Queensland Ambulance Service	Peter John Warrener
Western Australia Ambulance Service	Christopher David Hopkins
Western Australia Ambulance Service	Brian William Keding
Western Australia Ambulance Service	John Charles Layton
South Australia Ambulance Service	Dieter Bruce Scheurich
South Australia Ambulance Service	John Treloar

=== Emergency Services Medal (ESM) ===
Branch	Recipient
New South Wales Emergency Services	William Peter Carter
New South Wales Emergency Services	Mark Anthony Gibson
New South Wales Emergency Services	Colin Johnston
New South Wales Emergency Services	Bruce Leslie Mitchell
New South Wales Emergency Services	Kenneth John Speer
New South Wales Emergency Services	Alan John Williams
Victoria Emergency Services	Richard Lentell Head
Victoria Emergency Services	Michelle Louise Olinder
Victoria Emergency Services	Graeme Edward Poulton
Queensland Emergency Services	Ronald William Tyler MBE
Queensland Emergency Services	Michael Anthony Vosti
Western Australia Emergency Services	Connie Annette Eikelboom
Western Australia Emergency Services	Graham Charles Fixter
South Australia Emergency Services	Warren Anthony Hicks
Tasmania Emergency Services	Robert William Butterfield
Tasmania Emergency Services	Frank Anketell Henderson
Tasmania Emergency Services	David Thomas Oakley
Northern Territory Emergency Services	Karl Heinz Herzog

== Gallantry, Conspicuous and Distinguished Service ==
=== Star of Gallantry (SG) ===
Branch	Recipient	Citation
Army	Sergeant P—	For acts of conspicuous gallantry in action in circumstances of great peril while on Operation SLIPPER in Afghanistan.

=== Commendation for Gallantry ===
Branch	Recipient	Citation
Army	Private A—	For acts of gallantry in action while a machine-gunner under enemy fire in Afghanistan in January 2010.
Army	Private Marley Clifton Bird	For acts of gallantry in action while a rifleman and Acting Section Second-in-Command, 6 Section, Combat Team Bravo, Mentoring and Reconstruction Task Force 2 during Operation SLIPPER in Afghanistan from July 2009 to February 2010.
Army	Private J—	For acts of gallantry in action as a team member during heavy and sustained enemy fire on Operation SLIPPER in Afghanistan in 2009.
Army	Corporal J—	For acts of gallantry in action while a patrol signaller and joint terminal air controller in Afghanistan in 2009.

=== Bar to the Distinguished Service Cross ===
Branch	Recipient	Citation
Army	Colonel V— DSC	For distinguished command and leadership in action as a commanding officer on Operation SLIPPER in Afghanistan in June 2009.

=== Distinguished Service Cross (DSC) ===
Branch	Recipient	Citation
Army	Colonel Peter John Connolly	For distinguished command and leadership in action while Commanding Officer, Mentoring and Reconstruction Task Force 2, on Operation SLIPPER in Afghanistan from June to December 2009.
Army	Major General Mark Andrew Kelly AO	For distinguished command and leadership in action in the Middle East Area of Operations as the Commander Joint Task Force 633 for Operations CATALYST, SLIPPER and KRUGER from January 2009 to January 2010.

=== Bar to the Distinguished Service Medal ===
Branch	Recipient	Citation
Army	Major G— DSC DSM	For distinguished leadership in action while an officer commanding on Operation SLIPPER in Afghanistan in 2009.

=== Distinguished Service Medal (DSM) ===
Branch	Recipient	Citation
Army	Captain A—	For distinguished leadership in action as a platoon commander on Operation SLIPPER in Afghanistan in 2009.
Army	Major B—	For distinguished leadership in action while the officer commanding on Operation SLIPPER in Afghanistan in 2009/2010.
Army	Major Brenton John Russell	For distinguished leadership in action while the Officer Commanding, Operational Mentoring and Liaison Team Charlie, Mentoring and Reconstruction Task Force 2 in Afghanistan in 2009.
Army	Warrant Officer Class Two S—	For distinguished leadership in action as a team commander during Operation SLIPPER in Afghanistan in 2009.
Army	Major David Anthony Trotter	For distinguished leadership in action while a combat team commander on Operation SLIPPER in Afghanistan from July 2009 and February 2010.
Army	Captain Michael Anthony Whitney	For distinguished leadership in action while the Chinook Troop Commander, Rotary Wing Group 4 on Operation SLIPPER in southern Afghanistan from July to October 2009.

=== Commendation for Distinguished Service ===
Branch	Recipient	Citation
Navy	Lieutenant Commander Benjamin Dalton	For distinguished performance of duty in warlike operations as the Operations Officer HMAS Toowoomba, on Operation SLIPPER in the Middle East Area of Operations from June to November 2009.
Army	Corporal B—	For distinguished performance of duty in warlike operations and in action as a team commander on Operation SLIPPER in Afghanistan in 2009.
Army	Sapper William James Barry	For distinguished performance of duty in warlike operations and in action while a combat engineer in Mentoring and Reconstruction Task Force 2 on Operation SLIPPER in Afghanistan in 2009.
Army	Captain C—	For distinguished performance of duty in warlike operations and in action while a platoon commander on Operation SLIPPER in Afghanistan in 2009.
Army	Corporal Jacqui Marie De Gelder	For distinguished performance of duty in warlike operations in the application of medical knowledge and for skill, courage and selflessness while in Mentoring and Reconstruction Task Force 2, on Operation SLIPPER in Afghanistan in 2009.
Army	Major Nigel Halifax Earnshaw	For distinguished performance of duty in warlike operations while the Officer Commanding, Security Detachment XV, on Operation KRUGER in Iraq from May 2009 to January 2010.
Army	Captain K—	For distinguished performance of duty in warlike operations and in action as a platoon commander on Operation SLIPPER in Afghanistan in 2009 and 2010.
Army	Captain L—	For distinguished performance of duty in warlike operations and in action as a troop commander on Operation SLIPPER in Afghanistan in 2009.
Army	Captain M—	For distinguished performance of duties in warlike operations while a troop commander on Operation SLIPPER in Afghanistan in 2009.
Army	Corporal Joshua Leigh Raward	For distinguished performance of duty in warlike operations and in action while a security section second-in-command and section commander in Mentor and Reconstruction Task Force 2 on Operation SLIPPER.
Army	Lieutenant John McKinnon Westhorpe	For distinguished performance of duty in warlike operations and in action while Platoon Commander, 5 Platoon, Mentoring and Task Reconstruction Task Force 2 in Afghanistan in 2009.
Air Force	Flight Lieutenant Alan Ross Turner	For distinguished performance of duty in warlike operations while the Medical Officer and Aero-Evacuation Operations Officer – East, Force Support Team – Kandahar, Force Support Unit 2 during Operation SLIPPER in Afghanistan from August 2009 to April 2010.

=== Bar to the Conspicuous Service Cross ===
Branch	Recipient	Citation
Navy	Commodore Stuart Campbell Mayer CSC	For outstanding achievement in a non-warlike situation as the Commander Joint Task Force 631 on Operation ASTUTE in East Timor from October 2009 to February 2010.
Army	Colonel Mark Andrew Brewer CSC	For outstanding achievement in a non-warlike situation as Commander Joint Task Force 629 on Operation PADANG ASSIST in the aftermath of the 30 September 2009 earthquake in western Sumatra.

=== Conspicuous Service Cross (CSC) ===
Branch	Recipient	Citation
Navy	Commander John Joseph Cowan	For outstanding devotion to duty as Commanding Officer HMAS Sirius.
Navy	Captain Robert Harold Elliott	For outstanding achievement as the Director of the Anzac Class Anti-Ship Missile Defence Upgrade Project.
Navy	Captain Stephen Grant Elms	For outstanding devotion to duty as Director Navy Training.
Navy	Chief Petty Officer Wayne Gregory Limbert	For outstanding devotion to duty as the Staff Officer of the Australian Defence Force Academy Cadets Mess.
Navy	Captain Stephen John O'Keefe	For outstanding achievement as the Chief of Staff Australian Defence Force Warfare Centre.
Army	Major Sisto Nickolai Bernardo	For outstanding achievement on the Army Staff within the Force Development Group.
Army	Lieutenant Colonel Frederick David Cobain	For outstanding achievement as the Commanding Officer and Chief Instructor of the Battle Command Wing, Combat Training Centre, in preparation of Battle Group Headquarters for operational service.
Army	Colonel Graham Alan Durant-Law	For outstanding achievement in project management, strategic reform agenda implementation and the development and acquisition of an e-health system for Defence.
Army	Lieutenant Colonel Lionel Haynes	For outstanding achievement as the Staff Officer Grade One Industrial Relations and Remuneration, Personnel Branch – Army.
Army	Colonel Scott Walter Hicks	For outstanding achievement to the Australian Army as Director Workforce Strategy.
Army	Lieutenant Colonel Andrew Robert Meacham	For outstanding achievement as the Commanding Officer of the Warrant Officer and Non-Commissioned Officer Academy.
Army	Major Marcos Leonardo Medina DSM	For outstanding achievement as Officer Commanding the Army Explosive Hazards Centre.
Army	Lieutenant Colonel Leo Michael Monkivitch	For outstanding achievement as Deputy Director Munitions – Land, Munitions Branch, Defence Materiel Organisation.
Army	Colonel Linda Karen Reynolds	For outstanding achievement as the Director of Army Strategic Reform Program coordination.
Army	Lieutenant Colonel Colin Gordon Riley	For outstanding achievement as the Commanding Officer of the 12th/40th Battalion, The Royal Tasmania Regiment.
Army	Lieutenant Colonel Stephen Ross Shaddock	For outstanding achievement as the Staff Officer Grade One Health Materiel Logistics and Pharmacy within Joint Health Command.
Air Force	Wing Commander Patrick Joseph Cooper	For outstanding achievement as Chief, Joint Airspace Control Cell, Headquarters Joint Operations Command.
Air Force	Squadron Leader Damien David Hare	For outstanding achievement as Chief Engineer at Air Movements Training and Development Unity, Royal Australian Air Force Base Richmond.
Air Force	Wing Commander Brock James McKinlay	For outstanding achievement as a Deputy Director within the Directorate of Personnel – Air Force.
Air Force	Wing Commander Neil Franklin Pearson	For outstanding achievement as Commanding Officer of Tactical Transport Logistic Management Unit.
Air Force	Squadron Leader Phillip Neil Pender	For outstanding achievement as the Commanding Officer of the Defence Explosive Ordnance Training School.
Air Force	Wing Commander David Anthony Riddel	For outstanding achievement during the rapid introduction of the Heron Remotely Piloted Vehicle and associated intelligence support system to Afghanistan.

=== Conspicuous Service Medal (CSM) ===
Branch	Recipient	Citation
Navy	Lieutenant Commander Simon Jon Howard	For devotion to duty as the Executive Officer of HMAS Toowoomba.
Navy	Petty Officer Renai Irvine	For devotion to duty as Office Manager to Chief of Navy.
Navy	Chief Petty Officer Brett Neil Shead	For devotion to duty as the main propulsion senior maintainer and Marine Engineering department regulator aboard HMAS Sydney.
Navy	Chief Petty Officer Lisa Jayne Terry	For devotion to duty as the Combat System Manager aboard HMAS Anzac.
Army	Lieutenant Colonel Dana Alexander	For meritorious achievement as the Staff Officer Grade 2 Personnel and Logistics of the 11th Brigade.
Army	Sergeant Thomas Kevin Bauer	For meritorious achievement as a forward repair team leader and maintenance manager with Timor-Leste Aviation Group XII on Operation ASTUTE from October 2009 to February 2010.
Army	Warrant Officer Class One Gregory Lance Bobbin	For meritorious achievement as the Operator Administrative Technical Manager for Headquarters 3rd Brigade.
Army	Corporal Phillip Gregory Bull	For meritorious achievement as the Manager Command Support Systems, Headquarters Joint Task Force 631 on Operation ASTUTE in East Timor from May 2009 to February 2010.
Army	Major Matthew James Dwyer	For meritorious achievement as the Platoon Commander Ammunition Platoon, Army School of Ordnance, at the Army Logistic Training Centre.
Army	Major Martin Neil Holmes	For meritorious achievement as the Staff Officer Grade Two Operations and Exercises, Joint Operations Support Staff, New South Wales.
Army	Lieutenant Colonel Martin Jeffery McKone	For meritorious achievement as the Staff Officer Grade One Personnel Policy – Army.
Army	Sergeant R— SG	For meritorious achievement in the development of capability within the Regiment.
Army	Warrant Officer Class One Matthew James Sullivan	For meritorious achievement as the Artillery Adviser for the Land 17 Artillery Replacement Project in support of the delivery of operational capability.
Army	Lieutenant Colonel Matthew Vertzonis RFD	For meritorious achievement as the Staff Officer (Strategic Reform Program) Cadet, Reserve and Employer Support Division.
Army	Warrant Officer Class Two W—	For meritorious achievement in the Regiment over an extended period.
Air Force	Warrant Officer Andrew John Cross	For meritorious achievement as Warrant Officer Operations for the Australian Defence Force Tactical Data Link Authority, and Initial Common Support Infrastructure Project Manager for Joint Project 2089 Phase 2A.
Air Force	Squadron Leader Craig Brian Darby	For meritorious achievement as the Senior Engineering Officer at Number 2 Operational Conversion Unit, Royal Australian Air Force Base Williamtown.
Air Force	Flight Sergeant Jenny Leigh Dillon	For meritorious achievement as the Medical Support and Policy Subject Matter Expert within the Directorate of Personnel – Air Force.
Air Force	Warrant Officer Craig Stephen Morris	For meritorious achievement as the Warrant Officer Engineer at Number 2 Squadron.
Air Force	Warrant Officer Mark Gregory Pentreath	For meritorious achievement as the Executive Warrant Officer at Aerospace Operational Support Group, Royal Australian Air Force Base Edinburgh.
