= Babbage (disambiguation) =

Charles Babbage (1791–1871), was an English mathematician, mechanical engineer, and pioneering computer scientist.

Babbage may also refer to:

== Science and technology ==
- Babbage (programming language), a high-level assembly language for the GEC 4000 series minicomputer
- Babbage (crater), a crater on the Moon
- Charles Babbage Institute, an information technology research center at the University of Minnesota, US
- Charles Babbage Research Centre, Canada, publisher of the journal Ars Combinatoria

== Other uses ==
- Babbage (surname), a given name and a family name (including a list of persons with the name)
- Babbage's, a video game retailer that eventually became GameStop
- A river in the Arctic Ocean watershed in Yukon, Canada
