= Emmett Dunne =

Australian rules footballer and police officer

Personal information
- Born: 11 June 1956 (age 70)
- Original team: Mount Waverley Juniors
- Height: 197 cm (6 ft 6 in)
- Weight: 98.5 kg (217 lb)

Playing career^{1}
Years	Club	Games (Goals)
1976–1983	Richmond	115 (56)
1984–1985	Footscray	14 (7)
1987	Springvale	9 (18)
Total		138 (81)
- ^{1} Playing statistics correct to the end of 1985.

Career highlights
- VFL Premiership player: (1980); VFA Premiership player: (1987); Footscray Reserves captain: (1985–1986)

Emmett Mark Dunne APM (born 11 June 1956) is a former Australian rules footballer who played for the Richmond Football Club and the Footscray Football Club in the Victorian Football League (VFL).

He is also a former police officer who served nearly 40 years with Victoria Police.

== Football career ==
Dunne is one of few VFL players to have played in premierships at three levels for the same club. He was captain of Richmond's Under 19 team in 1973 against Essendon, named at centre half-back, then a member of the Reserves team that won the 1977 flag against Footscray, again named at centre half-back, and was named at full-back in the 1980 VFL Grand Final victory against Collingwood. He also played in the 1982 VFL Grand Final against Carlton.

The Tigers crashed to tenth place in 1983 and coach Francis Bourke resigned. Dunne only managed 11 games for the season, and was one of a number of players who departed the club at the end of that season, joining Footscray. After playing 13 senior games in 1984, Dunne was made captain of Footscray's Reserves team in 1985 and also won the club Reserve grade best and fairest. In 1986 he was appointed Reserves captain-coach and led the Bulldogs to the Army Reserve Cup Grand Final where they lost to Carlton.

In 1987, he was recruited by VFA club Springvale, and was a member of its 1987 premiership team before retiring.

== Police career ==
Dunne joined Victoria Police in 1976. On 22 August 2009, Dunne was promoted to the rank of Assistant Commissioner in charge of the north/west region. He was awarded the Australian Police Medal in the 2011 Australia Day Honours.

In May 2013, while serving as Assistant Commissioner, it was revealed on ABC's The 7.30 Report that Dunne had been accused of bullying by former inspector Gordon Charteris. In a WorkSafe report, Dunne was criticised as being "difficult to deal with" and an "aggressive manager" and that there had been "a failure to formally address [his] behaviour, management and style." Dunne responded in a statement defending his actions but also acknowledging Charteris's frustration at the outcome:

I also accept Gordon's right to report his complaints to the Office of Police Integrity and WorkSafe. At all times I have fully and properly complied with any and all requests made of me by the OPI and WorkSafe.

In June 2014, he retired from Victoria Police after 38 years service; at the time he was in charge of the professional services command.

== Coaching and Administration ==
After retiring as a player at the end of 1987, Dunne returned to Richmond and served as Reserves coach from 1988 to 1992, then took on the role of ruck coach under John Northey from 1993 to 1995. He then served as a member of the AFL Tribunal for 20 years, starting in 1997 and finishing when he was appointed a director on the Richmond board in September 2016, filling a vacancy created by the retiring John Matthies. In a statement, club president Peggy O'Neal said:

"We are delighted to have Emmett join the board. He brings a wealth of experience on many levels - not only as a result of his long association with elite and grassroots football - but through his distinguished career with the Victoria Police. He brings a particularly strong skill set in areas such as ethical leadership, culture and capability, integrity and security – areas of paramount importance in the modern game."

As a former Richmond player, Dunne's appointment was also met with approval by the club's members, who voted to retain him as a board director in December 2016. His responsibilities on the club board have included chairing the club's History and Traditions Committee, being a member of the Risk, Compliance and Integrity committee, the Punt Road Re-development Committee and also a Patron of "Neville Crowe’s Legacy".

As Chair of the History and Traditions Committee, one of Dunne's most controversial assignments was a two-year investigation into historical awarding of Best and Fairests at Richmond, leading to the conclusion that club legend and icon Jack Dyer had not been awarded a Best and Fairest in 1932 and would thus have that entry removed from the official honour board. Jack Dyer Jr was disappointed with the outcome and vowed to seek proof to have his father reinstated.

In January 2021, the AFL bestowed Life Membership upon Dunne under the ‘Special Service to the Game’ category.

== Bibliography ==
- Hogan P: The Tigers Of Old, Richmond FC, Melbourne 1996
