= Nola Randall-Mohk =

Australian teacher

Nola Randall-Mohk is an Australian teacher who has been involved in advocating and assisting in immigration, refugee and multicultural issues in New South Wales. In 2011 she was awarded the Medal of the Order of Australia "For service to multicultural relations, particularly through roles with Cambodian and Khmer associations". She has worked in NSW TAFE Outreach Coordinator in South Western Sydney Institute since the 1980s.

Randall-Mohk had been the Director of Human Resources and Public Officer for the Cambodian-Australian Welfare Council of NSW since 1984. In that time she has played active roles in Migrant Resource Centres and in 2008 was appointed to the Australian Multicultural Advisory Council (AMAC).

Randall-Mohk was presented with the NSW Lifetime Achievement in Community Service Award by John Hatzistergos, Attorney General and Minister for Citizenship and Peter Primrose, Minister for Volunteering, acknowledging her commitment to meeting the educational needs of disadvantaged adults and their access to suitable vocational opportunities.
