= Babbage (surname) =

Babbage is an English surname. Notable people with the surname include:

- Benjamin Herschel Babbage (1815–1878), Australian engineer
- Bob Babbage (born 1951), American politician
- Charles Babbage (1791–1871), English mathematician, mechanical computer pioneer
- Charles Whitmore Babbage (1842–1923), Australian embezzler in Wanganui, New Zealand
- Dennis Babbage (1909–1991), English mathematician
- Dugald Bromhead Babbage (1823–1881), Australian surveyor
- Eden Herschel Babbage (c. 1844 – 1924), prominent citizen of Roseville, New South Wales
- Frank Babbage (1858–1916), English animal painter and wood-engraver
- Herbert Ivan Babbage (1875–1916), New Zealand artist
- Ross Babbage (born 1949), defense analyst
- Stuart Babbage (1916–2012), Anglican priest
