= Mark Brewer (soldier) =

Australian Army officer

- Military career
- Allegiance: Australia
- Branch: Australian Army
- Rank: Brigadier
- Commands: Royal Military College, Duntroon; Joint Task Force 629; 2nd/14th Light Horse Regiment
- Conflicts: War in Afghanistan
- Awards: Member of the Order of Australia; Conspicuous Service Cross & Bar; Bronze Star Medal (United States)

Brigadier Mark Andrew Brewer, AM, CSC & Bar is a senior Australian Army officer and a former Commandant of Royal Military College, Duntroon, the officer training school of the Australian Army. He held this position from 2016 to 2017. He graduated from Duntroon in 1987.

Brewer has been awarded the Conspicuous Service Cross (CSC) twice. He received the CSC in the 2006 Queen's Birthday Honours, and received a Bar for it in the 2011 Australia Day Honours. He was appointed a Member of the Order of Australia in the 2018 Australia Day Honours.
