= Jill Slay =

British-Australian engineer and computer scientist

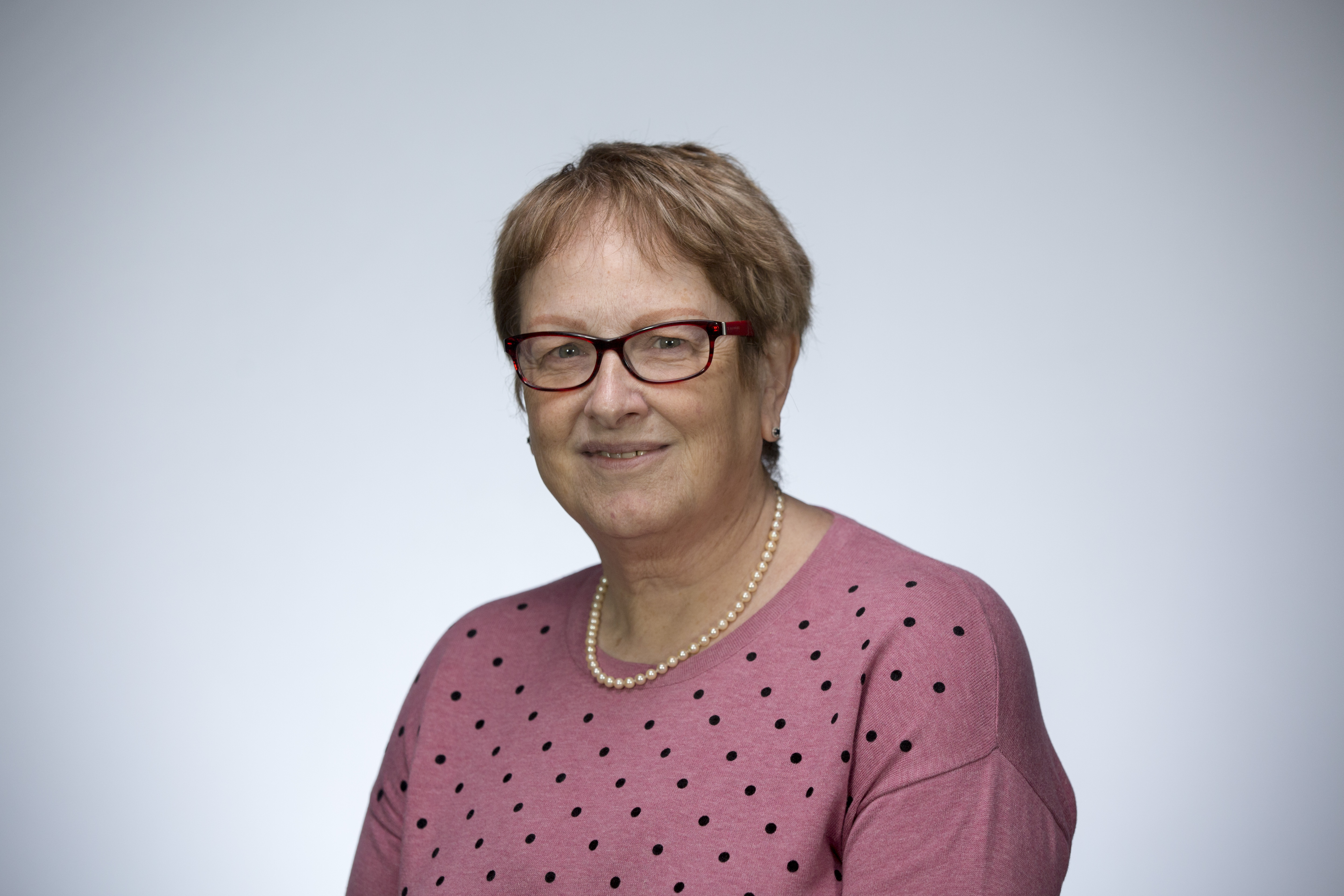

Jill Slay AM is a British-Australian engineer and computer scientist. Her work has attracted international attention and she was made a Member of the Order of Australia for "service to the information technology industry through contributions in the areas of forensic computer science, security, critical infrastructure protection, and cyberterrorism."

== Career ==
Slay completed a B.Sc. degree with honours in mechanical engineering from the University of Hertfordshire in Hatfield, Hertfordshire, England, in 1975. After working as a professional engineer she returned to university to undergo a Doctor of Philosophy in science education, at Curtin University: Perth, WA, AU, which she completed in 2000.

Upon receiving her Ph.D. Slay began her academic career as an information security researcher at the University of South Australia. During this time she was approached by South Australia Police to assist with cases involving computer devices. After 12 years at the University of South Australia, Slay moved to Namibia where she served as the Dean of IT at the Polytechnic of Namibia (now known as Namibia University of Science and Technology). Slay returned to Australia in 2014 where she was the Founding Chair and Director of the Australian Cyber Security Centre as a professor at the Australian Defence Force Academy through the University of New South Wales in Canberra.

== Honors and awards ==
Slay was made a Member of the Order of Australia (AM) in the 2011 Australia Day Honours. She is a Fellow of the International Information Systems Security Certification Consortium and also a Fellow of the Australian Computer Society. In 2015 Slay was awarded the Australian Information Security Association InfoSec Educator of the Year.
