= TAFE Outreach =

Educational initiative in Australia

TAFE NSW Outreach is an initiative in the Australian tertiary education sector to offer educational opportunities to people who would not otherwise gain access to appropriate courses. Outreach negotiates courses with potential students (hours, attendance, subjects and content, etc.). All Outreach courses are free, as they target disadvantaged groups in the Australian community. They can be held at colleges or off campus in community locations to cater for isolated communities, childcare needs, lack of transport, and other barriers.

The TAFE NSW Outreach Program is designed to provide an access point by which adults can re-enter education. The Outreach Program aims to:

- develop vocational skills that can lead to paid employment;
- develop courses of study that will provide alternative pathways through the tertiary education system offer a range of programs, including bridging, remedial, and introductory courses, to assist individuals to gain or enhance the skills necessary to find work;
- promote the most beneficial and educationally efficient relationship between TAFE Institutes and other educational institutions throughout the State.
