= Ian Olver =

- Born: 10 May 1953 (age 73); Melbourne
- Citizenship: Australian
- Education: University of Melbourne (MBBS, MD), Monash University (PhD)
- Known for: Expertise in cancer control
- Awards: Member of the Order of Australia
- Scientific career
- Fields: Cancer control and bio-ethics
- Workplaces: Cancer Council Australia, University of Sydney

Ian Olver AM (born 10 May 1953) is an Australian oncologist, cancer researcher and bio-ethicist. He is a former chief executive officer of Cancer Council Australia and a noted authority and media commentator on cancer issues.

In 2011, he was appointed to the Order of Australia for service to medical oncology as a clinician, researcher, administrator and mentor, and to the community through leadership roles with cancer control organisations.

His main research interests are new anticancer drug studies, symptom control, bio-ethics and psycho-oncology. He has authored more than 200 journal articles, 19 book chapters and two books as well as co-editing two books.

== Life and career ==
Ian Olver was born in Melbourne, Australia, and educated at Wesley College.

He studied medicine at the University of Melbourne, graduating in 1976. He then trained in medical oncology at the Peter MacCallum Cancer Institute, the Alfred Hospital in Melbourne and the University of Maryland Cancer Centre in Baltimore, receiving Fellowship of the Royal Australasian College of Physicians in 1984.

After finishing his medical oncology training Olver worked for six years at the Peter MacCallum Cancer Institute where he jointly developed the oncology clinic at Bendigo Base Hospital.

In 1991 he was awarded an MD from the University of Melbourne for a project in antiemetic clinical trial methodology and in 1997 he completed a PhD in bioethics from Monash University, exploring life and death issues.

He moved to Adelaide in 1991 as Director of Medical Oncology at the Royal Adelaide Hospital where he worked to establish a comprehensive multi-disciplinary cancer centre, becoming the Clinical Director in 1993. In 2001, he became the first Cancer Council SA Professor of Cancer Care at the University of Adelaide where he is currently an adjunct professor in the Department of Medicine.

While in Adelaide he initiated a number of programs to improve cancer care in rural and remote areas and for Indigenous people. He established the first medical oncology clinic in Alice Springs and pioneered a telemedicine link for multidisciplinary cancer care between Adelaide and Darwin which provided benefits for both local patients and clinicians. He has also led research into culturally appropriate approaches to the treatment and care of Indigenous Australians diagnosed with cancer.

Ian Olver was elected chair of the Medical Oncology Group of Australia from 2004 to 2006.

In May 2006, Olver moved to Sydney when he was appointed CEO of Cancer Council Australia, Clinical Professor in the Department of Medicine at the University of Sydney and an Honorary Associate, Department of Medical Oncology, Royal Prince Alfred Hospital.

In February 2015, Olver returned to Adelaide to take up the appointment of Director for the Sansom Institute for Health Research at the University of South Australia.

In addition to these positions he was chair of the board of directors of the National Breast and Ovarian Cancer Centre and serves on a number of advisory committees including the advisory board of Cancer Australia, and the Health Ethics and Prevention and Community Health Committees of the National Health and Medical Research Council.

Olver also supports cancer care in India through his association with the Christian Medical College Hospital in Vellore, through the Australian Friends of Vellore group. He trained the first medical oncologist for the hospital and is president of the Australian Friends of Vellore.

He is also interested in spiritual matters and has a Certificate of Ministry (Lay Preaching) from the Adelaide College of Divinity.

== Honours and recognition ==
- 2011: Appointed a Member of the Order of Australia (AM) for service to medical oncology as a clinician, researcher, administrator and mentor, and to the community through leadership roles with cancer control organisations
- 2008: Received the Cancer Achievement Award from the Medical Oncology Group of Australia which is awarded a scientist, clinician or health care professional that has made an outstanding contribution to the control of cancer in Australia.

== Authorship ==
- Conquering Cancer: Your Guide to Treatment and Research.(1998)
- Is Death ever preferable to Life?(2002)
- When Cancer Crosses Disciplines: A Physicians Handbook. (co-editor) (2009)
- The MASCC Textbook of Cancer Supportive Care and Survivorship. (co-editor) (2011)
- Investigating Prayer: Impact on Health and Quality of Life. (2012)

== Fellowships ==
- Royal Australasian College of Physicians (FRACP) (1984)
- Royal Australian College of Medical Administrators (MRACMA) (1993)
- Chapter of Palliative Medicine (FAChPM) (2000)
