= Noel Whittaker =

Australian writer and newspaper columnist

- Born: 1940 (age 85–86)
- Occupations: Writer, journalist
- Website: noelwhittaker.com.au

Noel John Whittaker AM (born 1940) is a writer and newspaper columnist. Whittaker has written 22 books, including the bestseller Making Money Made Simple. Whittaker writes columns in major Australian newspapers, including The Age, The Sunday Mail (Brisbane), the Sydney Morning Herald, and The Sunday Times (Perth). He also writes for magazines and broadcasts on the radio.

For 30 years, he was the director of financial planning firm Whittaker Macnaught (which closed in 2013). He has a degree in accountancy.

== Awards ==
- Australian Investment Planner of the Year (1988)
- Australian Centenary Medal (2003)
- Member of the Order of Australia (2011)

== Books ==
- 25 Years Of Whitt & Wisdom
- Aged Care, Who Cares?
- Getting It Together
- Golden Rules Of Wealth
- Making Money Made Simple (24 editions)
- Money Tips – The ABC Of Money Matters
- The Beginner’$ Guide To Wealth
- The Retirement Living Handbook
- The Self Managed Super Handbook
- Winning Property Tax Strategies
- Retirement Made Simple
- Superannuation Made Simple
- 10 Simple Steps to Financial Freedom
