= Louise Newman =

Australian developmental psychiatrist

Professor Louise Newman
- Citizenship: Australian
- Known for: Psychiatry
- Scientific career
- Workplaces: Monash University

Louise Newman is an Australian developmental psychiatrist and clinical researcher currently based at Monash University, in Melbourne, Australia. She is an advocate for the mental health of asylum seekers.

== Early life and education ==
Newman completed her secondary education in 1976 in Australia. She then continued to complete a Bachelor of Honours in Psychology in 1980 at The University of Sydney. Prime Minister of Australia Tony Abbott was a student there during this time. Based on her interest in abnormal psychology and a desire to carry out clinical work, she applied for graduate entry to Medicine. She was aged in her 20s and was among the first ten graduate entries to the degree of Medicine.

While studying medicine in Sydney, Australia she independently studied psychoanalysis to complement her education and training.

Newman then went on to specialise in psychiatry, in particular infant psychiatry and completed a PhD investigating trauma in infancy at The University of Sydney in this area, awarded in 2007.

== Work in psychiatry ==
Following completion of her training, Newman worked as the Clinical Director of Child Psychiatry in South West Sydney and until 1997. Her focus during this period was largely on child mistreatment. While working in South Western Sydney in the 1990s, Newman was exposed to the plight of asylum seekers and recent immigrants in Australia. These events expanded her career focus to incorporate asylum seeker advocacy and mental health, specifically "working to ensure the trauma that some asylum seekers experienced in their homeland is not exacerbated by Australia's policy of mandatory detention"

Newman has a particular interest in the field of infant psychiatry where she specialises in working with parents with babies up to three years of age. These parents often have psychiatric difficulties themselves and the resulting transgenerational issues and impact of trauma on early development is one of her primary research interests. With research staff at Monash University, she is investigating the impact of interventions for high risk parents. In addition, Newman performs refugee research on school aged children investigating the impact of traumatic experiences both before they arrive in Australia and as refugees. She is a strong advocate for young refugees and works to highlight the damage that can be caused to young people by detention and the refugee experience in Australia.

=== Appointments ===
- Former Member and Chair of the Detention Expert Health Advisory Group / Immigration Health Advisory group for the Department of Immigration and Citizenship
- Senior advisory roles to the Australian Department of Immigration
- Chair of the Perinatal and Infant Psychiatry at The University of Newcastle
- Chair of the Borderline Personality Disorder Expert Reference Group for the Department of Health and Aging
- Director of the New South Wales Institute of Psychiatry
- Chair of the Faculty of Child and Adolescent Psychiatry
- President of The Royal Australian and New Zealand College of Psychiatrists from (2009–2010)
- Professor of Developmental Psychiatry at Monash University (2014)
- Director of the Monash University Centre for Developmental Psychiatry and Psychology (2014)
- Convenor of the Alliance of Health Professions for Asylum Seekers (2014)
- Works at the Centre for Mental Health in the Health Department, where she is involved in policy development
- She was recently appointed at the Director of the Centre for Women’s Mental Health at the Royal Women’s Hospital, Melbourne

=== Student supervision ===
- Currently, Newman co-supervises 9 PhD students and is a primary supervisor for one PhD student
- She has previously supervised two PhD students to completion (2013–2014).

== Awards and honours ==
- In 2009 Pat, Toni and Peter Kinsman Research Scholarship to encourage research into postnatal depression in women in Australia and New Zealand.
- In 2011, Newman was appointed as a member of the Order of Australia 'for service in Medicine in the fields of perinatal, child and adolescent mental health, to education and as an advocate for refugees and asylum seekers'.

== Personal ==
Taken from an interview with ABC Local Radio:

- Newman lives in Melbourne. She has a brother. She spent most of her youth in South America (Brazil and Mexico), followed by the United Kingdom.
- Her father was a Jewish refugee from Vienna and therefore grew up very aware of human rights violations and their impact on society. Her father was involved in protests actions against the Nazis. He was a nuclear physicist.
- Newman's mother was an artist.

== See also ==
- Monash University
