= Ross Babbage =

Australian CEO

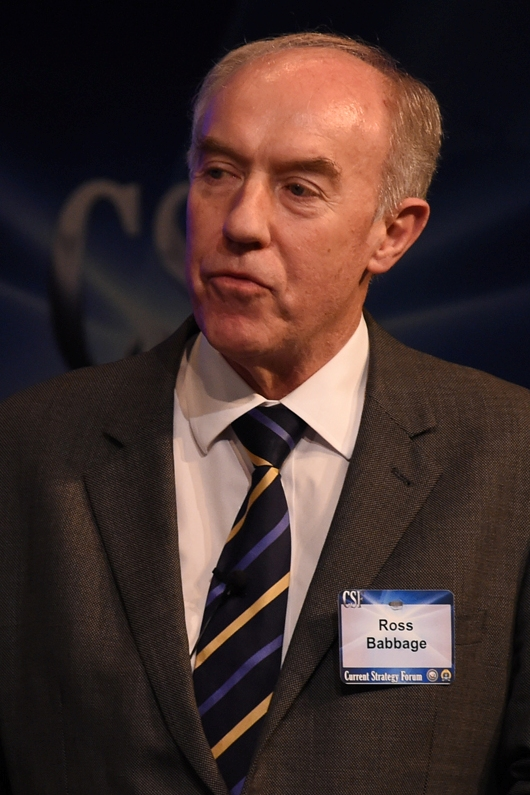
Ross Babbage in 2016

Ross Eden Babbage (born 1949) is the Chief Executive Officer of Strategic Forum Pty Ltd and a Non-Resident Senior Fellow of the Center for Strategic and Budgetary Assessments (CSBA) in Washington DC. Babbage is also Managing Director of Strategy International, a national security consulting and educational services company. Babbage formerly held the position as Head of Strategic Analysis in the Office of National Assessments and Assistant Secretary for ANZUS and then Force Development in the Department of Defence. He has also been an advisor to various government ministers and departments

Babbage was educated at Barker College in Sydney. He subsequently completed bachelor's and master's degrees in economics from the University of Sydney and a PhD in International Relations from the Australian National University.

In 2003 to 2004 he served as head of the Strategic and Defence Studies Centre at the Australian National University.

He has addressed Australia's future defence needs in a range of reports and papers and in February 2011 his study of Australia's defence needs in the future Australia's Strategic Edge in 2030 was released.

Babbage was appointed a Member of the Order of Australia on 26 January 2011.

== On the U.S.-China Strategic Rivalry ==
Previewing his upcoming book in a NYT column, Babbage argued that a major war in the Indo-Pacific is more likely now than ever since WWII, that it would be catastrophic, and that the United States is woefully unprepared.

== Publications ==
- Rethinking Australia's Defence (University of Queensland Press, St Lucia, 1980)
- A Coast Too Long: Defending Australia Beyond the 1990s, Allen & Unwin, Sydney, 1990.
- Preparing Australia's Defence for 2020 – Transformation or Reform? (Kokoda Foundation, Canberra, 2005)
- Australia's Future Underwater Operations and System Requirements (Kokoda Foundation, Canberra, 2007)
- Firepower to Win: Australian Defence Force Joint Fires in 2020 (Kokoda Paper, Canberra, 2007)
- Strategic Decision-Making: Optimising Australia's National Security Planning and Coordination for 2015 (Kokoda Paper, May 2008)
- Australia’s Strategic Edge in 2030, Kokoda Paper, Canberra, 2011.
- Game Plan: The Case for a New Australian Grand Strategy, Menzies Research Centre, Canberra, 2015.
- Countering China’s Adventurism in the South China Sea – Strategy Options for the Trump Administration, Center for Strategic and Budgetary Assessments and Strategic Forum, Washington D.C. 2016.
- Stealing a March: Chinese Hybrid Warfare in the Indo-Pacific: Issues and Options for Allied Defence Planners. Center for Strategic and Budgetary Assessments and Strategic Forum, Washington D.C., 2019.
- Winning Without Fighting: Chinese and Russian Political Warfare Campaigns and How the West Can Prevail, Center for Strategic and Budgetary Assessments and Strategic Forum, Washington D.C., 2019.
- Which Way the Dragon? Sharpening Allied Perceptions of China’s Strategic Trajectory, Center for Strategic and Budgetary Assessments and Strategic Forum, Washington D.C., 2020.
- The Next Major War – Can the US and its Allies Win Against China? (forthcoming), Cambria Press, New York, 2023.
