= 2004 Australia Day Honours =

The 2004 Australia Day Honours are appointments to various orders and honours to recognise and reward good works by Australian citizens. The list was announced on 26 January 2004 by the Governor General of Australia, Michael Jeffrey.

The Australia Day Honours are the first of the two major annual honours lists, the first announced to coincide with Australia Day (26 January), with the other being the King's Birthday Honours, which are announced on the second Monday in June.

== Order of Australia ==
=== Companion (AC) ===
==== General Division ====
Recipient	Citation	Notes
Professor Graeme Milbourne Clark AO	For service to medicine and to science through innovative research to further the development of cochlear implant technology for worldwide benefit.	
Professor Adrienne Elizabeth Clarke AO	For service to science and academia as a leading international researcher, for the application of economic benefit to scientific discovery, and for mentoring future leaders.	
Leonard Gordon Darling AO CMG	For service to the arts through vision, advice and philanthropy for long-term benefit to the nation.	
Professor John Anthony Hay	For service to advancing higher education in Australia including contributions to research and innovation policies and funding, and at the University of Queensland through significant development of academic and administrative structures.	
Ian John Macfarlane	For service to the stabilisation of the Australian financial system, to central banking, and to the operation of monetary and economic policy both in domestic and international spheres.	
Dr Michael John Vertigan	For service as a community leader in public administration, through development of far-reaching fiscal policy reform; in business and industry, through focusing on strategic investment for sustainable economic growth; and in education through university governance.	
Sir Bruce Dunstan Watson	For leadership in a range of fields of endeavour covering industry and commerce, the arts, and education and for developing medical research facilities of international standard in Australia.	

=== Officer (AO) ===
==== General Division ====
Recipient	Citation	Notes
Professor Peter Ronald Andrews	For service to scientific research, particularly drug design, and to the development of an Australian research-based pharmaceutical industry.	
Professor Lesley Margaret Barclay	For service to nursing, particularly in the fields of midwifery and child health in Australia and internationally through participation in development assistance activities.	
Dr Robin John Batterham	For service to science, engineering and technology through promoting collaboration, excellence and innovation to enable Australian industry to remain internationally competitive and innovative.	
Dr Gordon Briscoe	For service to the Indigenous community in promoting access to social justice, improved health, education and legal services, and by raising public awareness and understanding of cultural heritage.	
Henry Clifford Burmester QC	For service to the community in the field of law as Chief General Counsel of the Commonwealth providing advice across a range of diverse issues including international law, and administrative and constitutional matters.	
Rodney Mark Cavalier	For service to the community as a contributor to a range of cultural, literary and sporting organisations, to education and training, and to the New South Wales Parliament.	
Jan Chapman	For service to the Australian film industry as a producer and as a contributor to organisations providing strategic direction to the industry.	
The Honourable Robert Lindsay Collins	For service to the community of the Northern Territory in the areas of transport, tourism and natural resource development, and to Indigenous people as an advocate for social justice, land and sea rights and access to improved educational opportunities.	
James Granville Cousins	For service to arts administration, particularly as a major contributor to advisory and management committees of the National Gallery of Victoria, and to the community of Geelong.	
Joy Elizabeth Dudine	For service to science and for enhancing the reputation of the Australian scientific community internationally.	
Beatrice Eileen Faust	For service to the community in the areas of social, political and employment reform and through provoking debate and raising public awareness of issues affecting women's rights.	
Dr Victor Warren Fazio	For service to medicine as a surgeon, researcher, administrator and educator, particularly in the area of colorectal disease.	
Professor Enid Gilbert-Barness	For service to medicine as a paediatric pathologist, particularly in the areas of cardiovascular, genetic and metabolic disorders, and as a researcher, teacher and diagnostician.	
Anne Glover	For service to early childhood and primary education, particularly relating to Indigenous communities in rural and isolated areas of Australia and Papua New Guinea.	
Michelle Grattan	For service to journalism through commentary on politics and government and analysis of Australian civic life.	
David Campbell Jones AM OBE	For service to the community through support for a broad range of organisations related to business, charity, civic and children's health.	
Douglas Kefford	For service to the bus transport industry in the areas of industry regulation and safety reform, and to the community through the preservation of Australia's rural heritage and philanthropy.	
The Honourable Roslyn Joan Kelly	For service to the community through promoting corporate environmental responsibility and fostering dialogue between business and conservation groups, to the Australian Parliament, and to women's health.	
Peter Ernest Kirby	For service as a leader, reformer and administrator in a range of public policy areas including the labour market, education and training sectors.	
James Oswald Little	For service to the entertainment industry as a singer, recording artist and songwriter and to the community through reconciliation and as an ambassador for Indigenous culture.	
The Honourable Justice Ruth Stephanie McColl	For service to the law, to continuing professional development and education, particularly for women, and to the community in matters affecting Indigenous groups and youth.	
Donald Gordon McGauchie	For service to the Australian grain and wool industries and for economic reform of Australian agricultural commodity handling and marketing.	
Dr Barry McGaw	For service to educational research and policy in Australia and internationally.	
Harold Charles Mitchell	For service to the community, particularly as a benefactor and fundraiser in support of artistic and cultural endeavour, and to business through advertising and media interests.	
The Honourable John Colinton Moore	For service to the community through the Australian Parliament, to the development of strategic industry policy, and to both policy and management reform in the defence sector.	
Lofty Bardayal Nadjamerrek	For service to the preservation of Indigenous culture as a Senior Traditional man and significant artist whose work documents the relationship of the land and its ancestral past via the Mimih Spirits of rock art.	
Andrew Stuart Podger	For service to the community in the development and implementation of public policy relating to health and aged care.	
Professor Margot Ruth Prior	For service to the discipline of psychology in the areas of developmental and clinical psychology and for research leading to significant advances in the care and treatment of children with autism, learning difficulties and anxiety disorders.	
Leslie Arthur Quinnell	For service to state administration in New South Wales, particularly in the areas of executive functions of government, commonwealth/state relations and in strategic management of major events and celebrations.	
John Rothwell	For service to the Australian shipbuilding industry through the development of trade links and for significant contributions to vocational education and training.	
James Glen Service AM	For service to business and to the community particularly through support for arts, cultural and charitable organisations.	
Ann Caroline Sherry	For service to the community through the promotion of corporate management policies and practices that embrace gender equity, social justice, and work and family partnerships.	
Professor Annette Doris Summers RFD	For service to nursing and nurse education, to the reserve forces through the Royal Australian Army Nursing Corps and to the community.	
Robert Clive Sutton	For service to business, particularly Australian primary industry, through the development of trade links and to the community in promoting corporate support for charitable organisations.	
Professor Elizabeth Anne Taylor	For service to engineering education through the design and implementation of innovative academic programs, to professional associations, and to enhancing the status of women in the profession and promoting it as a career option.	
Ian Douglas Temby QC	For service to the law, particularly in developing the role of the independent prosecutor in the Australian criminal justice system.	
Suzanne Sharon Vardon	For service to the development and delivery of community support services, and for contributions to public sector governance.	
Barbara Ann Williams	For service to the community through support to the executive function of government at Commonwealth and State levels.	
Dr Robert Williamson	For service as a biomedical research scientist in the field of human genetics, as an educator and administrator, and as a major contributor to the debate on ethical issues related to genetics practice.	
Associate Professor Jill Elizabeth Wilson	For service to the community in the development and delivery of new models of care through the social support sector of the Uniting Church in Australia.	

==== Military Division ====
Branch	Recipient	Citation	Notes
Navy	Rear Admiral Kevin John Scarce AM CSC	Royal Australian Navy For distinguished service in logistics management and acquisition as the Head, Maritime Systems Division in the Defence Materiel Organisation.	
Army	Major General Timothy Roger Ford AM	For distinguished service to the Australian Defence Force as the Chief of Staff of the United Nations Truce Supervision Organisation, and later as Military Adviser, Department of Peacekeeping Operations at the United Nations in New York.	
Army	Major General David John Hurley DSC	For distinguished service, leadership and management to the Australian Defence Force in senior command and staff appointments.	
Air Force	Air Vice Marshal Christopher Geoffrey Spence AM	For distinguished service to the Royal Australian Air Force as Chief of Staff, Support Command Australia, as Commander Training Air Force and as Deputy Chief of Air Force.	

=== Member (AM) ===
==== General Division ====
Recipient	Citation	Notes
Harold Frank Anderson OAM	For service to local government in the Cities of Henley and Grange and Charles Sturt and to the community through the development of education, sport, leisure and health facilities, and the promotion of trade opportunities.	
Professor Ernest Frank Annison	For service to agricultural and veterinary science research and education, particularly in the fields of animal production and nutrition.	
Margot MacDonald Anthony	For service to the community through a range of arts organisations, particularly the Tweed River Regional Art Gallery and the Canberra Symphony Orchestra.	
Brian William Bartlett	For service to business through the development of rendered animal products and grains export markets, to the Australian Renderers Association, and through support for nutrition research.	
Janina Bassat	For service to the community as an executive member of a range of peak Jewish organisations and through the promotion of greater community understanding.	
Dr Helen Patricia Beange	For service to medicine, particularly in relation to the health needs of people with intellectual disabilities, and through clinical practice, advocacy, research and teaching.	
Mary Constance Beasley	For service to public sector administration in South Australia and to the community, particularly as an executive member of organisations in the fields of the arts, education, health and community celebrations.	
Gino Ernesto Beltrame	For service in the field of defence science and technology, particularly through the development of a countermeasure decoy system for use against anti-ship missiles.	
Wayne James Bennett OAM	For service to Rugby League football, particularly as a coach, and to the community.	
Edward Charles Best	For service to economic and business development in Tasmania through innovations and technological advances in the confectionery industry and to the community, particularly through Athletics Tasmania and Athletics South.	
Donald John Blackmore	For service to the environment, particularly through the Murray Darling Basin Commission and through the development of sustainable water management practices.	
The Honourable Justice Reginald Oliver Blanch	For service to the judiciary and to the administration of the civil and criminal justice systems in New South Wales.	
Maxwell Eric Bourke	For service to heritage and arts organisations and to the development of government policy for the preservation of Australia's historic and cultural environment.	
The Reverend Father Arthur Ernest Bridge OAM	For service to musically talented young Australians and to the wider community, particularly through the provision of opportunities to learn and perform in Australia and overseas and through commissioning new works.	
Jack Anthony Bromage	For service to small business development, particularly through mentoring programs.	
Muriel Pauline Cadd	For service to the community, particularly through leadership in the provision of services for Aboriginal and Torres Strait Islander children and their families.	
Audrey Elizabeth Cloughessy	For service to nursing as a clinician, consultant and educator, especially in the areas of emergency and trauma care.	
Dr Antonio Cocchiaro	For service to the development of multiculturalism in South Australia through community organisations, and to support for the social and cultural interests of the Italian community.	
The Honourable Peter E J Collins RFD QC	For service to the advancement of the arts, to the improvement of public health facilities, and to the New South Wales Parliament.	
Professor Roger Ryerson Collins	For service to education, particularly in the fields of organisational behaviour and human resource management.	
The Reverend Doctor Austin Patrick Cooper	For service to education and scholarship, particularly through the Melbourne College of Divinity, and to the community through the Oblates of Mary Immaculate Congregation.	
David Wheatcroft Cory	For service to the environment, particularly in the areas of rural lands protection in Queensland, and through animal, weed and pest management.	
Keith Eric Cottier	For service to architecture as a member of a range of planning, heritage protection and property management organisations, and as a practising architect.	
Suzanne Gertrude Cox	For service to community health, particularly as a lactation consultant, educator and counsellor for the care of breastfeeding mothers and their babies.	
John Albert Dawson	For service to health and safety in agricultural communities, particularly through Farmsafe Australia and the development of a range of programs aimed at improving farm safety practices.	
The Reverend Canon Howard Frederick Dillon RFD	For service to the community through Anglican church welfare services related to establishing chaplaincies, nursing homes, counselling and assistance for migrants and refugees.	
Professor Patricia Lynette Dunning	For service to public health and the nursing profession through diabetes education, research to improve the care of patients with diabetes mellitus and clinical practice.	
John Alfred Emerson	For service to the law and to the community, particularly through the provision of advice to charities and not-for-profit organisations and the development of public administration reform to encourage philanthropy in Australia.	
Robert Alexander Evans	For service to Rugby Union football, particularly as a coach of World Cup teams.	
Dr Christine Elizabeth Ewan	For service to tertiary education and administration, to public health, to distance education by improving access to services, and to the community of the Illawarra region.	
Timothy Vincent Fairfax	For service to business and commerce, particularly through agricultural, transport and communications enterprises, and to the community, through education and arts organisations.	
Dr Peter Craig Farrell	For service to biomedical research and engineering through the invention and development of therapeutic appliances, to business as an entrepreneur and to the community through philanthropy.	
John Anthony Fawcett	For service to the community and to international relations over many years through humanitarian projects to improve health and living standards for people in Bali.	
Jane Margaret Fenton	For service to the community, particularly through support for a range of health, medical research, youth and women's groups.	
Aristide Harry Ferrante	For service to the restaurant and catering industry, particularly through the Restaurant and Catering Association of Western Australia and apprenticeship training, and to the community through charitable organisations.	
Dr Thomas Mayne Ferrier	For service to medicine as a clinician and to medical education.	
Sarah Elizabeth Fitz-Gerald	For service to women's squash, particularly as a player, and to the promotion of sport and a healthy lifestyle.	
James Bower Forwood	For service to the community, particularly through the Australian Red Cross in the Northern Territory, and to the environment through Landcare and pastoral land management.	
Brian Arthur Fricker †	For service to the community, particularly through fundraising activities for a number of organisations including the National Heart Foundation and the Archbishops Appeal for the Needy, and to business.	
Susan Gazis	For service to education and to the teaching profession, particularly through leadership roles within the English Teachers Association of New South Wales and the Professional Teachers Council of New South Wales.	
Emeritus Professor Frank William Gibson	For service to science, particularly through biochemical research, to administration, and through support for professional organisations.	
Dr Brian Somerville Gillett	For service to educational administration in New South Wales and to the University of Wollongong.	
Michael William Gorton	For service to the community through a range of organisations including the United Nations Association and Greening Australia, and through the promotion of equal opportunity and Aboriginal reconciliation.	
Robert Alexander Grant	For service to education through the activities of the Association of Heads of Independent Schools and as Headmaster of Shore School.	
Anthony John Haraldson	For service to the Australian coal industry, through a range of management, advisory and representative roles in business, industry and government organisations.	
Karyn Anne Hart	For service to education, particularly through the Australian Secondary Principals Association, and to the wider community through NetAlert and drug education organisations.	
Joan Margaret Heard	For service to the community, particularly through Business and Professional Women Australia and the Association of Independent Retirees.	
Professor Laurie William Hegvold	For service to architecture, particularly through educational and professional associations, and to the development of export opportunities for Australian educational services.	
Emeritus Professor Murray Scott Henderson	For service to education and to the accounting profession, particularly through the University of Adelaide and professional practice associations.	
Peter Charles Hollingsworth	For service to engineering, particularly in the areas of environmental and geotechnical investigation in relation to mining, industry and urban development, and through professional associations.	
Professor Andrew Bruce Holmes	For service to science through research and development, particularly in the fields of organic synthesis and polymer chemistry.	
Professor John Joseph Hopwood	For service to biomedical research in the field of lysosomal storage disorders, and to the community through support for people affected by these diseases.	
Keith Jackson	For service to management and training in the media, communications and public relations fields, and to the development of non-commercial radio services.	
Charles Ernest Jamieson	For service to trade through the development of services to support Australian export enterprises and to attract investment in Australia.	
Richard Alexander Joel	For service to business through the promotion of investment and economic growth in Brisbane and to the community.	
Raymond David Joseph	For service to the Jewish community, particularly through the Melbourne Hebrew Congregation, and to Heartbeat of Victoria.	
Dr James Jupp	For service to the development of public policy in relation to immigration and multiculturalism, to education, and to the recording of Australian history.	
Lady (Catherine Mary) Kater	For service to the community, particularly through philanthropic contributions to a number of organisations including the St Luke's Hospital complex.	
Ian Campbell Kennedy	For service to the law, particularly within the family law jurisdiction, to continuing legal education and to professional organisations.	
Emeritus Professor Charles Baldwin Kerr	For service to medicine in the fields of public health and human genetics, and to education.	
Dr Margaret Jessica King Boyes	For service to adult education, particularly through the Delta Foundation.	
Kenneth Michael Kipping	For service to the community of North Queensland, particularly through the provision of financial advice to members of the Australian Defence Force and their families.	
Dr Geoffrey Alistair Knights	For service to engineering education, to Monash University as an administrator and researcher and through the establishment of its Gippsland campus, and to industry.	
Professor Gabor Thomas Kovacs	For service to medicine in the fields of gynaecology, obstetrics, family planning and in-vitro fertilization through research, specialist clinical services and education, and to the community.	
Mary Josephine Kroeber	For service to nursing, particularly in the area of stomal therapy and patient care, and as an administrator.	
Arthur Harold Laundy	For service to the community, particularly through philanthropic contributions to charitable organisations and assistance to people in need.	
Judge Rachelle Ann Lewitan QC	For service to the legal profession, particularly through advocacy for equality of opportunity for women to participate fully in the practice of law, and to the Women Barristers Association.	
Professor Reginald Sidney Lord	For service to medicine, particularly in the field of vascular surgery, through clinical practice, research and education.	
Rhys Philip Maggs	For service to emergency management and to the community, particularly through the Victoria State Emergency Service.	
John Clarence McAllery	For service to business development through classified newspaper publications in cities and regional centres and to the community through philanthropic contributions to charitable organisations.	
David Graeme McAllister	For service to the performing arts, particularly as Artistic Director of the Australian Ballet and as a Principal Dancer.	
(Geoffrey) Campbell McComas	For service to the entertainment industry as a speaker, actor and broadcaster, and to the community through fundraising for charitable organisations.	
The Honourable Anthony John Messner	For service to the Australian Parliament, to Norfolk Island as Administrator, and to the community, particularly veterans and their families.	
John Stewart Miller	For service to environmental protection and education, to the community of the south coast region of New South Wales, and to local government.	
Avon William Moyle	For service to the community through the Australian Churches of Christ Indigenous Ministries, particularly in the areas of reconciliation and encouragement of local community members to take on positions of leadership.	
Joram Murray	For service to the building industry, particularly through the Master Builders Association and the introduction of key industry initiatives and reforms.	
Timothy Charles Murray	For service to the development of boys’ education, particularly as Headmaster of Canberra Grammar School.	
Christine Marguerite Neilsen	For service to education and to the Australian expatriate community in Hong Kong as Principal of the Australian International School.	
Dr Alan George Nicholls	For service to medicine and to the community of the Riverina area as an orthopaedic surgeon and through participation in overseas medical missions with the Australian Red Cross.	
Dr Margaret Mary O'Flynn-Keaney	For service to medicine, particularly through the establishment and development of the Emergency Department at Calvary Hospital, Canberra.	
Dr Marie Jose O'Neill	For service to community health and to education as a psychologist, particularly through the development of early childhood programs and counselling for Indigenous and remote communities and for people in detention.	
Emeritus Professor John Malcolm Oades	For service to soil science through research and education, and to tertiary administration at the University of Adelaide and the Waite Agricultural Research Institute.	
Alan Clifford Overton OAM	For service to the community through a range of sports clubs and other organisations, particularly in the Parramatta region.	
Judith Ann Parker	For service to the community through the National Council of Women of Australia and a range of other organisations that benefit women and children.	
Dr Timothy Lawrence Pascoe	For service to arts and community organisations and to the development of business strategies for advancing the arts in Australia.	
Jangala (Jerry) Patrick	For service to the Indigenous community through the Baptist Union of the Northern Territory.	
Dr Allan Pattison	For service to the community through a range of organisations, particularly the Hunter Economic Development Corporation, and to tertiary education in New South Wales.	
Ross Matthew Petfield	For service to business and commerce, particularly through the Australian Stock Exchange Limited and the Securities Institute of Australia.	
Rae Denise Pierce	For service to education as Principal of Penleigh and Essendon Grammar School, particularly through the development of new initiatives in curricular and co-curricular activities.	
The Reverend Margaret Lellah Polkingthorne	For service to religion through the Uniting Church in Australia and contributions to inter-faith relations, and to the community, particularly through involvement in the health sector.	
Genevieve Rankin	For service to the community, particularly in the areas of conservation and the environment, reconciliation, local government, social justice and education.	
Dr Alan William Rice	For service to education, particularly in the area of literacy development, and to the community through contributions to church and sporting organisations.	
Emeritus Professor Terence James Robinson	For service to animal husbandry in the field of reproductive biology and to tertiary education and training in the agricultural sector.	
Judith Robson	For service to the community in Queensland, particularly through improving the administration and delivery of health-care systems and allied services.	
Rodney Isaac Rosenblum	For service to the development and reform of revenue law and to the community, particularly through AUSTCARE and Jewish Care.	
Victoria Mary Rubensohn	For service to the media and to telecommunications, particularly through the National Screen and Sound Archive Council and the Copyright Convergence Group.	
The Honourable Peter John Sams	For service to industrial relations in New South Wales and as an advocate for improved workplace safety.	
Dagmar Barbara Schmidmaier	For service to librarianship, particularly through the application of new technology and information systems and in the areas of administration and education.	
Edward David Scott	For service to industrial relations, particularly in the areas of best-practice workplace management and employee consultation and empowerment, as a contributor to the development of regional technical training and to the electricity supply industry.	
Dr Paul Desmond Scully-Power	For service to science in the fields of oceanography and space remote sensing, and to the community through contributions to a range of government regulatory agencies and through raising public awareness of conservation issues.	
Professor Roger Valentine Short	For service to science as a reproductive biologist and as a contributor to a range of international groups concerned with fertility and related issues.	
Enzo Sirna	For service to the community, particularly the Italian community, through a range of organisations concerned with education, multicultural affairs, welfare and the arts.	
Peter Andrew Sjoquist	For service to the visual and performing arts, to youth through the Rock Eisteddfod and Croc Festivals and to the community.	
Margaret Anne Staff	For service to the international community through the provision of nursing and hospital management services supporting humanitarian aid programs, particularly those of the International Red Cross movement.	
Ian Arthur Stainton	For service to urban development, employment generation, education and training and heritage and cultural preservation through the Penrith Lakes Development Corporation.	
Donald Stanley Stevens	For service to regional education, particularly as Chancellor of the University of Southern Queensland, and to the community of Toowoomba.	
John William Stewart	For service to the beef cattle industry, particularly as a contributor to regulatory bodies concerned with the prevention, control and elimination of diseases affecting the industry, and as a producer.	
Dr Susan Mary Stocklmayer	For service to science and to the community through the development of programs to raise public awareness of scientific ideas and issues and by encouraging young people, particularly girls, to enter the field.	
Barbara Jean Stone	For service to education as Principal of MLC School, as a leader in girls’ education and as a contributor to peak educational organisations.	
Freeman Roland Strickland OBE	For service to the community, particularly through St John Ambulance Australia and the Aerospace Maritime and Defence Foundation of Australia.	
Ronald Albert Swane	For service to the building industry in the areas of industry regulatory reform and workplace health and safety, as an administrator and adviser both nationally and internationally, and to the community.	
Robin Hamilton Syme	For service to the community as a contributor to a range of organisations involved in the provision of health, welfare and aged care services.	
Associate Professor Mark Gail Symons	For service to engineering, particularly through the development of innovative products and systems for the construction and building industries, to engineering education, and to the community through church related and musical activities.	
Sister Teresa Taggert	For service to the community as an advocate for the development of policies and professional standards for services to assist homeless families.	
Paul Charles Thompson	For service to the development of the commercial radio broadcasting sector in Australia.	
Margaret Tuckson	For service to the arts through the promotion of abstract expressionist art and through research into and collection of indigenous art, including the ceramic art of Papua New Guinea.	
Christopher David Tudor	For service to education, particularly as Principal of St Philips College, and through the introduction and development of outdoor education as a major area of interest.	
Emeritus Professor Norman McCall Tulloh	For service to research into the factors affecting the body growth and development of animals, and to agricultural science as a researcher, educator and administrator.	
Dr Keven James Turner	For service to medicine, particularly as a researcher into asthma and allergies, and to community health through outreach and education activities and care of people with asthma.	
Ross Tzannes	For service to the community through a range of organisations, particularly in the areas of multiculturalism and the arts.	
The Reverend Father John Joseph Usher	For service to the community, particularly children and young people, through the social welfare programs of the Catholic church and organisations providing services for children and statutory authorities.	
Professor Alfred Jacobus van der Poorten	For service to mathematical research and education, particularly in the field of number theory.	
Dr Anne Shirley Walker	For service to the international women's movement as a pioneer in the areas of human rights and economic and social justice, and as an advocate for the advancement of women in developing countries.	
His Honour Judge Frank Walsh QC	For service to the judiciary and the administration of justice in Victoria, and to the community through a range of church, social support, youth and sporting organisations.	
Professor Charles Roger Watson	For service to public health and education as an administrator and educator, to neuroscience, particularly as a contributor to work on brain mapping, and to the community.	
John Charles Watson	For service in the agricultural and food production sectors, particularly in the areas of industry reform and regulation, and to the communities of rural and regional Victoria.	
Dr Brian John Webber	For service to education through the independent schools’ sector, through contributions to the development of educational practices and as Headmaster of Prince Alfred College.	
Professor Elizabeth Anne Webby	For service to the study, teaching and promotion of Australian literature, for support to Australian authors, and for fostering links between the academic and general reading communities.	
Associate Professor William Henry Wilde	For service to Australian literature as an author, editor, scholar and educator.	
Dr Keith Leslie Williams	For service to science, particularly in the field of proteomics and the development of instrumentation and informatics to facilitate research and the commercial development of biotechnology.	
Marie Patricia Willis	For service to the community through the social support programs of the St Vincent de Paul Society, and to rural community development, particularly through Women in Agriculture and Business of South Australia Inc.	
Barbara Ker Wilson	For service to literature as an editor and author, and as a mentor to emerging writers.	
Simone Margaret Young	For service to the arts as a conductor with major opera companies and orchestras in Australia and internationally.	

==== Military Division ====
Branch	Recipient	Citation	Notes
Navy	Captain Allan Kendall Du Toit	For exceptional command and leadership as the Commander of the Multi-national Maritime Interception Force enforcing United Nations Sanctions against Iraq as part of Operation SLIPPER.	
Navy	Commodore James Goldrick CSC	For exceptional command and leadership as the Commander of the Multi-national Maritime Interception Force enforcing United Nations Sanctions against Iraq as part of Operation SLIPPER.	
Army	Brigadier Gary Alexander Bornholt CSC	For exceptional service as Commander of Australian Forces, deployed on Operation SLIPPER in the Middle East Area of Operations.	
Army	Colonel Gerard Paul Fogarty	For exceptional service and leadership as Commander of the Australian Contingent during operational service in East Timor.	
Army	Brigadier Douglas Ian Tyers	For exceptional service and leadership as Commander of the Peace Monitoring Group in Bougainville, and later as Commander of the Logistic Support Force.	
Army	Major General Simon Vincent Laidley Willis CSC	For exceptional service to the Australian Defence Force as Head of Australian Defence Staff (Washington) and as Head of the Defence Personnel Executive in Canberra.	
Air Force	Air Vice Marshal Julie Margaret Hammer CSC	For exceptional service in the fields of electronics engineering in Defence, and military education as the Commandant of the Australian Defence Force Academy.	
Air Force	Air Commodore Alfred John Quaife	For exceptional service to the Australian Defence Force as the fast-jet specialist officer in the fields of Air Combat Capability Development and Force Structuring and the application of Air Combat power.	
Dept of Defence	Ronald Bruce Bonighton	For meritorious performance in contributing to the promotion and development of Intelligence capabilities in support of the Australian Government and the Australian Defence Force.	
Dept of Defence	Kenneth Royden Peacock	For meritorious performance as Co-Chair of the Defence and Industry Advisory Council Aerospace Working Group and as Chairman of the Joint Strike Fighter Industry Advisory Council.	

=== Medal of the Order of Australia (OAM) ===
==== General Division ====
Recipient	Citation	Notes
Mehrban Barney Allam	For service to the community, particularly through Wesley Mission, and to the residential building industry.	
John Henry Anderson	For service to veterans and their families, particularly through the No. 31 Squadron Beaufighter Association.	
Jeffrey Samuel Angel	For service to conservation and the environment as a member of a range of organisations and committees concerned with environmental protection and preservation.	
Associate Professor Francis Leo Archer	For service to medicine, particularly in the development and delivery of education programs for ambulance officers and paramedics.	
Valencia Ruth Ashbourne	For service to the community, particularly through the Newcastle Lake Macquarie Foster Care Association.	
James Joseph Atkins	For service to the horse racing industry in Queensland, particularly as a trainer.	
Savas Augoustakis	For service to the multicultural community through a range of educational, welfare, social and cultural organisations.	
Joan Backwell	For service to the community, particularly through the Vision Australia Foundation.	
Bruce Warren Bagley	For service to the pharmacy profession, particularly through the development of education programs for pharmacy students, and to the community.	
Ronald Hedley Baker	For service to the community, particularly through the Coolangatta Queensland Ambulance Transport Brigade Committee and ex-service organisations.	
Russell Irving Baker	For service to the community, particularly through the South Australian Division of the Australian Red Cross.	
Ronald George Bannerman	For service to the community as a fundraiser for the Hunter Haematology Research Group.	
Dr Paul Edward Bannon	For service to medicine as a general practitioner in the Eurobodalla Shire.	
Alexander Barnett	For service to the community of Ballarat through the Eureka Stockade Memorial Park Committee.	
Betty Louise Beaton	For service to the community through a range of church, social support and educational organisations.	
Airlie Florence Bell	For service to the community, particularly through Australian Red Cross and the Hear and Say Centre.	
Dr Teri Ann Bellamy	For service to veterinary science, particularly through contributions to the preservation of wildlife.	
Marion Margaret Bertram	For service to the community of Yarram through a range of organisations, particularly the Yarram Uniting Church.	
Errol Frank Berwick	For service to the community through the programs of the Rotary Club of Fortitude Valley, particularly the Metropolitan Senior Citizens Club.	
Kerry Clive Berwick †	For service to local government and to the community of Devonport.	
Kenneth Charles Bird	For service to surf lifesaving as an executive member, official and administrator.	
Kenneth John Bird	For service to the community of Coonabarabran through a range of social support, veteran and rural organisations.	
Robert John Birkill	For service to the community, particularly as an administrator in the residential aged care sector.	
Phoebe Estelle Bischoff	For service to the community, particularly through organisations addressing issues affecting women and families.	
Carol Betty Bishop	For service to the community, particularly through a range of breast cancer support organisations and initiatives.	
Yvonne Blackman	For service to the community of Caloundra, particularly through the Caloundra Branch of the Australian Red Cross.	
Gavin Ross Blakey	For service to the community, particularly through Toastmasters International.	
Allan Blankfield	For service to the preservation of Australian military history and heritage and to the community.	
Margaret Nicol Blieschke †	For service to local government and to the community of Port Pirie.	
Marcelis Martinus Boersma	For service to the international community through the humanitarian assistance programs of Rotary International.	
Marjorie Teresa Boland	For service to the community as a fundraiser for health related organisations, particularly the Bone Marrow Donor Institute.	
Terence Bryan Bone	For service to veterans and their families, particularly through the Coorparoo and Districts Sub-Branch of the Returned and Services League of Australia.	
Jill Bowen	For service to the community through the Australian Stockman's Hall of Fame and Outback Heritage Centre.	
Maureen Mary Boyle	For service to netball as an administrator and umpire.	
Constance May Bramley	For service to the community of Edithburg, particularly through the women's choir The Wonkanas.	
Archimandrite George Branch	For service to the Russian community of Melbourne, particularly through the support services of the Russian Catholic Centre.	
John Brands	For service to the community, particularly through the Norah Head Search and Rescue Boat Club.	
Patrick Brennan	For service to the community, particularly through the Queensland Irish Association.	
Peter John Bridge	For service to the community through the publication of historical records of outback pastoral and mining regions of Western Australia.	
Dr Franklin Herbert Bridgewater	For service to the community, particularly through the development of ambulance services in South Australia and the charitable activities of St John Ambulance.	
Patricia June Brien	For service to the community, particularly through the Country Women's Association of New South Wales.	
John Briggs	For service to the paper industry, particularly through the introduction of environmentally sustainable manufacturing techniques.	
Kenneth Broadhurst	For service to the welfare of veterans and their families through the Western Australian Branch of the Returned and Services League of Australia.	
Lois Brock	For service to the community, particularly through the National Council of Women of South Australia, Zonta Club of Noarlunga/Southern Vales and World Education Fellowship.	
Dr David John Browning	For service to medicine, particularly as an obstetrician and gynaecologist, and to the community of Bowral and the surrounding district.	
Dr Lexia Roma Bryant	For service to medicine, particularly through support for women in rural and remote practice.	
Cheryl Anne Buckland	For service to the community, particularly through the Anglican Church.	
Leo Patrick Callinan	For service to the community of Ballarat, particularly to people with disabilities.	
Dr Lennox Lyle Callow	For service to parasitology, the cattle industries and veterinary science internationally through research leading to improved tick fever vaccines.	
Thomas Alexander Cameron †	For service to the community, particularly through the Lions Eye Institute of Western Australia.	
Donald Ross Carter	For service to the community of Menai, particularly through the Menai Bush Fire Brigade, and to local government.	
Henry Maxwell Catchpole	For service to the community of the north-west region of Tasmania, particularly through a range of health, aged care, educational, media and church organisations.	
William Bruce Chambers	For service to the wine industry as a wine maker and judge.	
Janice Lesley Chapman	For service to music as an operatic singer and teacher of voice, and as a contributor to research into human sound production and vocal health.	
Sheelagh Murielle Clark	For service to the community, particularly to children with hearing and sight disabilities through the Cronulla Lantern Club.	
Michael Joseph Clarke	For service to boxing by providing an insight into and recording of the history of the sport.	
Muriel Frances Clemens	For service to the community of Tullamore through a range of service, rural show and church groups.	
Roger Climpson	For service to the media, particularly through the Christian Broadcasting Association, and to the community through a range of service groups.	
Lynette Mary Clough	For service to the community, particularly through the Old Northcotian's Association.	
Robert David Coates	For service to the Scouting movement and to the community of the Illawarra region.	
Crystal Condous	For service to tertiary education as an administrator.	
Aune Onerva Cooper	For service to the community of Bungan Beach.	
Beryl Cooper	For service to the community of Ulverstone through a range of service organisations.	
Lawrence Percival Cooper	For service to the community of Chapman Valley, particularly through local government and a range of service and sporting groups.	
Joan Cottrell	For service to the community, particularly as a supporter of the Children's Hospital at Westmead.	
Mary Bobs Cox	For service to community health in north Queensland, particularly through the provision of physiotherapy services.	
Ronald Frederick Coxon	For service to veterans and their families, particularly through the South Australian Branch of the Vietnam Veterans Association of Australia.	
Arthur Charles Crapp †	For service to dental technology, particularly as a practitioner and teacher.	
Barbara Beatrice Crawford	For service to the entertainment industry as a vocalist, and to the community as a fundraiser for charitable organisations.	
Dr David Robert Crompton	For service to community mental health through the development of programs to treat post-traumatic stress disorder, anxiety disorder, and alcohol and drug disorders.	
Joan Wilson Crook	For service to the community of Merredin, particularly through aged care.	
Kevin John Crowe	For service to Rugby Union football as a player, referee and administrator.	
John Kirkwood Curdie	For service to the surveying profession as an administrator and educator, and to the community.	
Judith Margaret Curphey	For service to music, particularly through the Australian Girls Choir.	
Mary Elliott Cushnan	For service to the community of Townsville through women's, ex-service and social support groups.	
Professor Geoffrey Wyatt Dahlenburg	For service to medicine as an educator and administrator.	
Nancy Rachael Dalton	For service to the community, particularly women's groups, and as a fundraiser for charitable organisations.	
John Arthur Dance	For service to the community of the Huon Valley, particularly through the St Vincent de Paul Society.	
Donald William Dann	For service to the community, particularly veterans and their families through the Burnie Sub-Branch of the Returned and Services League of Australia.	
Dace Darzins	For service to the Latvian community of South Australia, particularly through multicultural education programs.	
Dr Llewellyn Maitland Davies	For service to medicine, particularly as a general physician, and to medical education.	
The Reverend Canon Bernard Rex Davis	For service to international relations through the promotion of cultural interests between Australia and Britain, particularly through the Lincolnshire Branch of the Britain-Australia Society.	
George Stanley Davis	For service to the community, particularly through the National Parks and Wildlife Foundation of New South Wales, and to the finance sector.	
Janet Elizabeth De Boer	For service to the development and promotion of textile arts, particularly as Executive Director of Australian Forum for Textile Arts.	
Paul Demetriou	For service to education, particularly through the introduction of second language teaching, to local government and to the Greek community.	
Constantine Leo Diamond	For service to the community of Parkes through support for health, aged care and social support groups.	
Harold James Diflo	For service to veterans and their families, particularly through the Queensland Branch of the Partially Blinded Soldiers Association of Australia.	
May Doon	For service to the community of Tumut through a range of aged care, church, cultural and service organisations.	
Margaret Watson Douglas	For service to arts and crafts through the practice, teaching and promotion of embroidery.	
Harold Ramsay Down	For service to the community through Lions International.	
Anthony Henry Downer	For service to the food industry, particularly through the development of food standards and regulatory systems.	
The Reverend Father Victor Joseph Doyle	For service to the community, particularly through the social welfare programs of the Catholic Church.	
Nancy Merle Drew	For service to women's golf and to the community, particularly as a volunteer with Australian Red Cross.	
Philip Wellesley Dulhunty	For service to international trade through the design, manufacture and export of equipment for large high voltage electric systems, and to aviation, particularly through the Seaplane Pilots Association of Australia.	
Wilma Rae Dunne	For service to international humanitarian aid through Operation Rainbow.	
Dr Edward Adrian Duyker	For service to the community through the preservation and documentation of Australian history, particularly that of the early European explorers and Mauritian immigrants.	
William Howarth Eady	For service to the community, particularly through the surf lifesaving movement.	
Dr Ernst H Ehrmann	For service to dentistry, particularly in the field of endodontics, and to the Jewish community.	
Hamilton Nelson Eustis †	For service to philately, aerophilately and aviation history, particularly through the Australian Airmail Society and as an author.	
Peter McKenzie Falconer	For service to agriculture, particularly as a farm management consultant, and to the community.	
Heather Jean Farren	For service to the community, particularly through the Townsville Sub-Branch of the Returned and Services League of Australia Women's Auxiliary and the Townsville Branch of the Queensland Police Citizens Youth Welfare Association.	
Edna May Farrow	For service to the community, particularly as a fundraiser for health and palliative care organisations and for people with disabilities.	
Sharon Lee Fellows	For service to the community through the organisation of a bowling league for people with physical and intellectual disabilities.	
Dr Barbara Rose Ferguson	For service to the community, particularly through the development of programs to meet the health, education and recreation needs of migrants, refugees and overseas students.	
Robert Fitz	For service to veterans and their families, particularly through the Launceston Sub-Branch of the Returned and Services League of Australia, and to the community.	
Cathryn Lorraine Fitzpatrick	For service to women's cricket as a player and promoter of the sport to young girls.	
Keith Archibald Flanagan	For service to the community, particularly through establishing public educational tours to the Burma-Thailand Railway.	
Maxwell George Foot	For service to the welfare of veterans and their families, particularly through the Goombungee Sub-Branch of the Returned and Services League of Australia, and to the community.	
Peter Ronald Francis	For service to the community, particularly through the Melbourne Citymission.	
Dr Edward Alan Freeman	For service to medicine, particularly in the field of severe brain injury.	
Wladyslaw Frelek †	For service to the community of Northern Tasmania.	
Donald William French	For service to the preservation and maintenance of steam locomotives.	
Thomas John Gates	For service to veterans’ golf as a player and administrator.	
Dr Tomislav Gavranic	For service to medicine as a general practitioner and through his commitment to addressing the health needs of Aboriginal people and people with alcohol dependency, and to the Croatian community.	
Kaylyn Mary Geeves	For service to botany and conservation, particularly through the Australian Plant Society Tasmania.	
Wing Commander Robert Henry Gibbes	For service to aviation and to tourism, particularly in Papua New Guinea.	
John Ernest Gibbons	For service to local government, and to the community of Werribee.	
Patricia Margaret Gibson	For service to local government, and to the community of Shepparton.	
Gail Antoinette Giuliano	For service to the community, particularly through a range of dance, theatre and music groups.	
Dr Elizabeth Gaye Gleeson	For service in the field of child and adolescent psychology, and to the community through the Friends of the Historic Houses Trust of New South Wales.	
Grace Margaret Goode	For service to horticulture through the culture and hybridization of bromeliads.	
Mary Julienne Grant-Owens	For service to the community of Hurstbridge and the surrounding region, and to local government.	
Dr Christopher Green	For service to medicine, particularly family health, and to the community by providing advice on parenting.	
Judith Green MBE	For service to the community through the New South Wales Meals on Wheels Association and to the community of the Southern Highlands.	
Denis Charles Gregory	For service to the rural community of New South Wales, particularly as a journalist.	
Errol Frederick Grieve	For service to the community of Mudgee, particularly through emergency services and sporting groups.	
Evan Lloyd Griffiths	For service to the surf lifesaving movement, and to the community of Helensburgh.	
Frederick William Guy	For service to the community of Hamilton, and to the international community through humanitarian aid agencies.	
Joan Alexandrina Guymer	For service to the arts, particularly through the Shepparton Performing Arts Association, to education, and to the community of Shepparton.	
Helen Ann Hall	For service to the community of the Hunter region, particularly as a contributor to the development of health services and strengthening the volunteer network to support the services.	
Beryl May Halpin	For service to care of the ageing people of the North Bellarine Peninsula, and to the community of St Leonards.	
Howard Townsend Halsted	For service to the community, particularly through the Mosman Sub-Branch of the Returned and Services League of Australia.	
Dr Ronald Francis Hambleton	For service to the community through the St Vincent de Paul Society and internationally through the provision of voluntary dental services.	
Donald MacFarlane Hamilton	For service to equine sport, particularly through the Australian Saddle Pony Association and the Royal Agricultural Society of New South Wales.	
Derrick Windsor Hand	For service to the administration of justice, particularly in the coronial jurisdiction, and to the community.	
Major Leonard Oswald Hansen	For service to the community of Mackay, particularly the ex-service community.	
Gwenneth Jean Harden	For service to botany as a researcher, publisher, conservationist and educator.	
Kerrie Nicole Harding	For service to the community through the organisation of a bowling league for people with physical and intellectual disabilities.	
Ronald Clyde Hardman	For service to the community of Moree.	
Edna Ellen Hardman	For service to the community of Moree.	
William Harris	For service to the transport industry, particularly through the Chartered Institute of Transport and Logistics.	
Gerrald Francis Harrison	For service to the welfare of veterans and their families, and to the community as a participant in programs developed to educate children about Australia's military history.	
Raymond Oswald Hartley	For service to the Australian community in New York and to charitable groups in Australia as a concert pianist.	
Noel Hugh Harvey	For service to local government, regional Victoria and to the community of Kyneton.	
William James Haskell	For service to the community, particularly through establishing public educational tours to the Burma-Thailand Railway.	
George Raynor Hayhow	For service to the community of Kalgoorlie-Boulder.	
Elizabeth Mary Higgs	For service to the community, particularly through the Friends of the Royal Botanic Gardens Melbourne.	
Dr Michael Samuel Hirshorn	For service to medical technology through the development of strategies for product commercialisation.	
Nancy Jean Hodgkinson	For service to the community, particularly through support for the veteran community.	
Dr Denis Hoffmann	For service to veterinary science, particularly in the area of virology.	
Captain David John Hogan	For service to the community of South Australia through the State Rescue Helicopter Service.	
Eliza Nellie Hogan	For service to the community of Shellharbour through a range of organisations providing care for ageing people.	
Ivan Grenfell Holliday	For service to the environment, particularly as a researcher, educator and promoter of Australian flora.	
Una Wallace Hollingworth	For service to the performing arts through the staging of theatre productions and as a stage and costume designer.	
Jack Hollingworth	For service to the performing arts through the staging of theatre productions and as a director.	
Haldane Sinclair Holman	For service to the arts as a designer and sculptor.	
Horace Holt	For service to the community, particularly as a performer and teacher of music.	
Peter Leonard Holt	For service to the community, particularly through Lions International.	
Laurence Mark Howarth	For service to the communities of Roseville, particularly through the Roseville Branch of the Australian Red Cross.	
Garry George Hulme	For service to the community, particularly through the Canterbury City State Emergency Service.	
Patrisha Marylynn Hurley	For service to the community, particularly through the Country Women's Association of New South Wales.	
Maurice Hurst †	For service to architecture.	
Catherine Ireland	For service to conservation and to the environment, particularly in the Blue Mountains region.	
Enid Susette Isaacs	For service to the community of Armidale, particularly through the production of audio books for the Australian Listening Library.	
Gilbert Jan	For service to the Chinese community, particularly through historical and cultural activities on behalf of Australian ex-servicemen and women of Chinese descent.	
William Donald Jane	For service to the community through fundraising for charitable organisations, particularly to the Austin Breast Cancer Research Foundation.	
Michael John Janes	For service to the community, particularly through the Vision Australia Foundation, and through involvement with the Catholic Church.	
Joy Christine Jeffes	For service to the community of the Peel region, particularly through environmental rehabilitation projects and support for aged care services.	
Hazel Eileen Jenkins	For service to the community, particularly through the Norparrin Centre for Children with Special Needs, and to the Motor Neurone Disease Association of Victoria.	
Clive Noel Johnson	For service to the community and to rural land conservation in the Central West region of New South Wales.	
Byram Thomas Johnston	For service to the development of Australian motor sport, to the community as a fundraiser for health service and research organisations, and to the accountancy profession.	
Kathleen Therese Johnston	For service to the community through training programs to enhance the delivery of services provided by Justices of the Peace.	
Steven Norman Johnston	For service to the community, particularly residents and travellers in remote locations, through the Australian National Four Wheel Drive Radio Network.	
Ellen Mary Jones	For service to the community of Sandgate.	
Eric Stanley Jones	For service to people with an intellectual disability, particularly through the establishment and administration of the Ovens and Murray Region Special Olympics, and to the community.	
Jennifer Anne Jones	For service to chemistry education through professional development of science educators, and through the advancement of science education in primary and secondary schools.	
Richard Thomas Jordan	For service to the community of the Georges River district, particularly through aged care, youth and sporting organisations.	
Carole Anne Juric	For service to the community of Wollongong, particularly through the Wollongong Australia Day Committee.	
Dr Milan Kantor	For service to the Czech Republic community, particularly through the promotion of cultural and social activities and the establishment of aged care accommodation.	
Edmond Henry Keir	For service to people with a hearing or visual impairment and their families, particularly through the Deafblind Association, and to the advancement of the field of audiology.	
Prudence Elizabeth Kellaway	For service to the community, particularly through fundraising for the Children's Medical Research Institute.	
Lynette Moira Kellow	For service to the community, particularly through the Queensland Writers Centre, the Older Women's Network, and the establishment of OWNWRITE.	
Shane John Kelly	For service to cycling as a competitor and through support for the development of junior riders.	
Alan Patrick Kennedy	For service to the community of Armidale, particularly to people with drug and alcohol dependencies through Freeman House and the St Vincent de Paul Society.	
Martin John Kennedy	For service to music, particularly to the preservation of jazz music history through the Victorian Jazz Archive, and to the community.	
The Reverend Doctor Cornelius Brendan Keogh	For service to the community, particularly through rehabilitation support for people with a mental illness as co-founder of GROW.	
Lee Raymond Kernaghan	For service to remote and regional communities through the 'Pass the Hat Around' fundraising concerts, and to country music as an artist and performer.	
Pastor Trevor Kenneth King	For service to people with alcohol and drug dependencies by providing rehabilitation support, particularly through the Westside Mission.	
Marie Terese Krygsman	For service to the community, particularly to children in need of crisis care, as a Barnardos foster carer.	
Esther Lakis	For service to the community, particularly to the Greek community through the Australian Hellenic Educational Progressive Association, and to the arts through the Brisbane Eisteddfod Committee.	
William Kenneth Lane †	For service to veterans and their families, particularly through the Gunnedah Sub-Branch of the Returned and Services League of Australia.	
Heather Law	For service to softball as a player, coach, umpire and administrator, and to the community of Cairns.	
Dorothea Maria Lechner	For service to the community, particularly through the Blue Ladies volunteer group at Campbelltown Hospital, and through fundraising support for charitable organisations.	
Francis Yuen-Fai Lee	For service to the Chinese community through a range of media, cultural and social organisations.	
Kenneth Newton Lyttle	For service to veterans and their families, particularly through the Tamworth Sub-Branch of the Returned and Services League of Australia.	
Miriam Ann Macartney	For service to the community, particularly through the Brotherhood of St Laurence Auxiliary Opportunity Shop.	
Paul Frederick Macphee	For service to veterans and their families, particularly through the Veterans Support and Advocacy Service.	
Robert Charles Manning	For service to the community of the Cairns region through the development and promotion of the tourism, maritime and aviation industries.	
Clarence Ray Marquardt	For service to the cattle industry, particularly through the development of the Illawarra breed and as a show judge, to the dairy industry, and to the community.	
Clifford Marriott	For service to the community, particularly people with an intellectual disability through the Lorna Hodgkinson Sunshine Home.	
Gloria Marshall	For service to the community, particularly through fundraising and support for the Australian Red Cross.	
John William Martin	For service to Rugby Union football as a player, coach and administrator, and to the community.	
William Alexander Martin	For service to the community of Crookwell.	
Robert Leonard Maughan	For service to the community through wildlife protection, education and health care organisations, and to the automotive industry, particularly through the International Car Distribution Program Australia.	
Neil Yager Maxwell	For service to the community, particularly through the Vision Australia Foundation.	
Brenda Gordon Mazzucchelli	For service to the community, particularly through education and welfare organisations associated with the Anglican Church of Australia.	
Stanley David McAndrew	For service to the veteran community, particularly through the 'N' Class Destroyer Association.	
Robert McCarron	For service to the Australian film, television and stage industries, particularly in the fields of make-up and special effects, and to the community, particularly through St John Ambulance Australia.	
Brother Paul Dean McGlaughlin	For service to the development of Catholic education in South Australia.	
Peter James McMillan	For service to the community, particularly in the field of church music.	
Cynthia McMorran	For service to the community and to local government in the Shire of Moora.	
Millicent Anne McNeill	For service to the community, particularly through the Australian Red Cross in Victoria.	
Phillip James Medcalf †	For service to the community as a supporter and promoter of the interests of people living with HIV/AIDS.	
Irene Meeuwissen	For service to the community, particularly through Cystic Fibrosis Victoria.	
Jean Isobelle Melzer	For service to the community and to education, particularly through the University of the Third Age, and to environmental conservation in the Cape Paterson area.	
Harry Michaels	For service to the Greek community, particularly in the field of multicultural media, and to soccer.	
Jim Mitcho Milanko	For service to multiculturalism in South Australia, and to the Macedonian community.	
Kenneth John Milbourne	For service to the community, particularly through St John Ambulance Australia, and as a contributor to the preservation of maritime and railway history in Tasmania.	
Paul Ashton Mitchell	For service to the community, and to environmental resource management and planning.	
John Munro Moller RFD	For service to the community of the Sandringham district, through a range of family support, health, sporting and ex-service groups.	
John Morrison Monteath	For service to the surveying profession in New South Wales, and to the community of Newcastle.	
Bertram Peter Moore	For service to the welfare of veterans and their families, and to the community of Toukley.	
Olive Gwenne Moore	For service to the community, particularly as a contributor to genealogical studies, and to mathematics education.	
Suzanne Morey	For service to nursing, particularly through the care of patients with respiratory disease.	
Chadwick William Morgan	For service to country music.	
Dorothy Bertha Morgan	For service to the community of Albany, particularly through organisations associated with the arts.	
Dr Robert G B Morrison	For service to conservation and the environment, and to the fields of science education and communication.	
Joan Mary Muir	For service to the community of Grafton through ex-service, service and aged care organisations, and as a contributor to the development of special education services in the area.	
Keith William Muir	For service to nature conservation, particularly through the Colong Foundation for Wilderness.	
Nicholas John Murphy	For service to the community as a contributor to the preservation of history relating to the Gippsland region.	
Dr Richard Wingfield Murray	For service to veterinary science, particularly in the field of urban animal management.	
Florence Annie Napier	For service to the community of Forbes.	
Giuseppe Narduzzo	For service to the Italian community of Melbourne.	
Dr David Charles Neesham	For service to water polo as a player, coach and administrator.	
Brenda Frances Nettle	For service to education through the Australian Federation of University Women (SA) and the Mathematical Association of South Australia.	
Barbara Eileen Newman	For service to the community of Launceston, particularly through aged care and craft organisations.	
Corinne Nicolson	For service to the community of the Sapphire Coast, particularly in the field of aged care.	
Arthur James Nightingale	For service to the community of the Evans Shire, particularly through the Rural Fire Service and the Rockley Lions Club.	
Sister Patricia Margaret Nolan	For service to tertiary education, particularly as an administrator.	
William Norris	For service to the ex-service community of the City of Blacktown.	
Group Captain Neil Leslie Northeast	For service to the community, particularly through the Australian Air Force Cadets.	
Christopher Arnold O'Brien	For service to lawn bowls, particularly through the Royal Victorian Bowls Association.	
Gregory Reginald O'Brien	For service to the community of Mansfield and as a supporter of people with Motor Neurone Disease.	
Walter Patrick O'Connell	For service to Rugby League football, particularly as a player and coach.	
Norris Hayward O'Leary	For service to the community of the Australian Capital Territory, particularly through Lions International, and to veterans’ hockey.	
William Oatey	For service to table tennis as a player, coach and administrator.	
Major John Paul Opie	For service to the community, particularly through the Military Museum of Tasmania.	
Professor Robert Arthur Ouvrier	For service to medicine through research in the field of paediatric neurology.	
Beryl Elizabeth Owen	For service to the community, particularly through a range of organisations providing support for amputees in New South Wales.	
Dr Peter Packer	For service to medicine in the field of otology.	
Charles Terrence Parker DCM	For service to the sport of shooting, particularly through the development of firearm safety training programs through the Sporting Shooters Association of Australia.	
Patricia Hazel Parker	For service as a contributor to community cultural development through the administration of a range of regional arts and community organisations.	
Joan Eileen Paroissien	For service to nursing as an administrator, and to the community through the Order of St Lazarus.	
Major Brian Martin Parsons	For service to the community through the Vision Australia Foundation.	
Dr Robert Paton	For service to medicine, particularly in the field of vascular surgery.	
The Reverend Canon Alan Reginald Patrick	For service to youth, particularly through Mission Australia, and to Anglican education.	
Harry Pearce	For service to the sport of harness racing as a journalist.	
Joy Lenore Pegg	For service to the community, particularly through the Cystic Fibrosis Association of New South Wales.	
Francis Shane Perram	For service to the community of Manly-Warringah through a range of charitable and sporting organisations.	
Eric Louis Philips	For achievement in polar exploration, and for service to the community by promoting outdoor activities, particularly to young people.	
John David Phillips	For service to the environment through Keep South Australia Beautiful, and to the community, particularly through Apex Australia.	
Laura Harriet Philp	For service to veterans and their families, particularly through the Women's Auxiliary of the Inverell Sub-Branch of the Returned and Services League of Australia.	
Maxwell Milton Philpott	For service to the community of Coonamble.	
Thomas Joseph Picot	For service to veterans and their families, particularly through the Returned and Services League of Australia, and to the community.	
George Warren Pinfold	For service to the community of Penrith through environmental rehabilitation, particularly as the proponent of the Penrith Lakes Scheme.	
The Reverend Kaye Pitman	For service to the Anglican Church of Australia, particularly in the field of education.	
Hans Pomeranz	For service to the film industry, particularly as a supporter of emerging film makers, and to the community.	
Peter Neville Porter	For service to literature as a poet, reviewer, broadcaster and essayist.	
The Reverend Heinrich Friedrich Proeve	For service to the Lutheran Church of Australia, and to the community of the Barossa Valley as an historian.	
Joseph Puglisi	For service to the tuna fishing industry, particularly through fisheries management, and to the community of Port Lincoln.	
Betty Vivian Pybus	For service to women, particularly through the Hobart Women's Centre and the Older Women's Network.	
Una Mae Radloff	For service to the community, particularly as a volunteer with the Moreton Bay Nursing Care Unit.	
The Very Reverend Archpriest Petar Rados	For service to the Serbian Orthodox Church in Australia.	
Joy Randall	For service to the community of Primrose Sands.	
Rale Rasic	For service to soccer as a player, coach and administrator.	
Verna Dorothy Rathmann	For service to nursing in South Australia as an administrator, and through the development of nursing skills and knowledge to ensure quality patient care.	
Shirley Jean Reavill	For service to the community of the Henley and Grange area.	
Gordon George Reeds	For service to the veteran community of the Central Coast.	
Hazel Mary Reid	For service to the community of Mount Isa, particularly through aged care organisations.	
Kevin James Rice	For service to architecture as a practitioner and through the professional association.	
Lachlan McEachan Rick	For service to the community of the Cardwell Shire through a range of health, emergency services and school groups.	
Alexander James Ritchie	For service to tourism in the Glen Innes region.	
Gloria Elizabeth Robbins	For service to the community through veteran, business and educational organisations.	
Lynette Anne Robertson	For service to the community, particularly through the Austin and Repatriation Medical Centre.	
James Malone Robson	For service to the community of Lithgow, particularly through church, aged care and health service groups.	
Peter George Rockliff	For service to the fishing industry, particularly through fisheries development, aquaculture and seafood processing.	
Una Margaret Rockliff	For service to the fishing industry, particularly through fisheries development, aquaculture and seafood processing.	
Dr William Norman Roebuck RFD	For service to education through technical industrial training programs and apprenticeships, and to the community.	
Raymond Dean Roesler	For service to horticulture through the cultivation and promotion of cymbidium orchids.	
Dr Ian Leonard Rowe	For service to medicine, particularly through the Royal Australian College of General Practitioners, and to the community through Rotary International and the Western Hospital.	
Peter Ridgeway Rowland	For service to the community as a benefactor to a range of public and private organisations, and to the catering industry.	
Rysia Maria Rozen	For service to the Jewish community of Victoria, particularly through the National Council of Jewish Women.	
John Michael Rudd	For service to eco-tourism in the Snowy Mountains region.	
Professor Michael Radford Sage	For service to radiology as a clinician, researcher and educator.	
Demetre Samios	For service to the community of Warwick, particularly through the Warwick Community Training Centre.	
Beryl Jean Schaeffer	For service to the community of the Bega Valley Shire, particularly through the agricultural show movement and the Country Women's Association.	
David William Scholes DFC	For service as an author and authority on fly fishing, particularly in Tasmania.	
Leon Maxwell Scott	For service to the community of Bendigo, and through support for Rotary's international humanitarian aid projects, particularly in East Timor.	
Sister Mary Catherine Sellen	For service to the community, particularly people with disabilities, through the Holy Cross Mercy Centre.	
Edward Robert Seltin	For service to the community of Camden Haven.	
Agnes Josephine Shea	For service to Ngunnawal people by contributing to the improvement and development of services for the Indigenous people of the Australian Capital Territory and region.	
Effat Shehata	For service to the Arabic community of Western Sydney.	
John Rupert Shoobridge	For service to the communities of the Derwent Valley and Central Highlands.	
Lynette Silver	For service to veterans and their families, particularly as an organiser of battlefield tours and commemorative services.	
John Grant Simmons	For service to botany, particularly through the identification, documentation and promotion of Australian acacias.	
Marion Helen Simmons	For service to botany, particularly through the identification, documentation and promotion of Australian acacias.	
Mark Stephen Skaife	For service to motor racing and to the community, particularly through fundraising activities for Ronald McDonald House Charities.	
Major Annie Jean Smart	For service to the community, particularly as an honorary chaplain with the Victoria State Emergency Service.	
Major Walter Keith Smart	For service to the community, particularly as an Honorary Chaplain with the Victoria State Emergency Service.	
Laurence Gordon Smith	For service to the community through the provision of voluntary service for major sporting events and through the 'Aunties and Uncles' youth assistance program.	
Lindsay Edward Smith	For service to wildlife preservation through the Southern Ocean Seabird Study Association.	
Betty Selina Smith-Gander	For service to the community, particularly through the Australian Red Cross.	
Daryl Paul Somers	For service to the television and entertainment industries, to charitable organisations and to the community.	
Walter Heinrich Sommer	For service to the building and construction industry through the development of industry-based training programs.	
Lois Ann Speed	For service to the community through the aged care programs of the Queensland Country Women's Association.	
Annette Joy Stilwell	For service to the arts in Tasmania, particularly in the area of music.	
Rozalia Stopic	For service to the Hungarian community of Sydney.	
Helen Katherine Strange	For service to the community of Toowoomba, particularly the welfare of veterans and their families.	
Leonard William Streets	For service to the community, particularly through the Frankston Sub-Branch of the Returned and Services League of Australia.	
Elizabeth Mary Strothers	For service to the community, through the aged care programs of Baptist Community Services - NSW and ACT.	
Kevin Francis Sullivan	For service to the community, particularly through the North Parramatta Branch of the St Vincent de Paul Society.	
Glenorchy Cumming Summors	For service to the community, particularly through the Pan Pacific South East Asia Women's Organisation, the Guiding movement and the Muscular Dystrophy Association.	
Joy Surrey	For service to lawn bowls as a player, administrator and umpire.	
Dr Ian Alexander Tait	For service to medicine as a general practitioner.	
Albert William Taylor	For service to the preservation and maintenance of steam locomotives.	
Alexandra McGilvray Terdich	For service to the community of Frankston through the Peninsula Ostomy Association Inc.	
Theresa Testoni	For service to the community of the Macarthur region, particularly through the tourism and hospitality industries, and to local government.	
Norma June Thomas	For service to the community of Coraki.	
Ann Marie Thompson	For service to music, particularly through the Medici Concert series.	
Barbara Marion Thompson	For service to the community, particularly as a fundraiser for and supporter of a range of health research, women's and cultural organisations.	
Stephen John Tonkin	For service to local government and to the community of the Shire of Menzies.	
The Reverend Noreen Margaret Towers	For service to homeless people, particularly through the Wesley Mission.	
Major Peter McDonald Trebilco ED	For service to the community through a range of health, social justice and welfare organisations.	
Demetrios Tsingris	For service to the Greek community as an author and through cultural activities.	
Cynthia Myrtle Turner	For service to the community through the Spasmodic Dysphonia Support Group (Australia).	
Peggy Turner	For service to the community of Peakhurst.	
Dr William Rowe Twycross	For service to the community of Mansfield.	
David William Wake	For service to the communities of Darke Peak, Cleve and Port Lincoln.	
Deborah Ruiz Wall	For service to the community in the areas of social justice, reconciliation and multiculturalism.	
Eric George Watson	For service to country music.	
Dr Alan Charles Watts	For service to medicine as a general practitioner and through the implementation of Q fever vaccination programs, and to the community of Carcoar.	
Fabian Paul Webb	For service to the community and to local government in the Shire of Kilkivan.	
Marion Jane Webster	For service to community and philanthropic organisations as an adviser and through the provision of administrative support.	
Margaret Olwyn Weir	For service to the community of Gerringong, and to children through the Gerringong Committee of the Children's Medical Research Institute.	
Gregory John Welch	For service to the sport of triathlon as an athlete, advisor, coach and commentator.	
Douglas Leslie Wenham	For service to the community of Edwardstown.	
Herbert James White	For service to the welfare of veterans and their families, particularly through the City of Sydney Sub-Branch of the Returned and Services League of Australia.	
William Graham Whittaker	For service to thoroughbred horse racing as a journalist.	
Lorraine Jeanette Willetts	For service to the community, particularly through the Shellharbour Hospital Auxiliary.	
Herbert Angus Williams	For service to the community, particularly through the Warringah Toy Repair Group.	
Lyn Adrienne Williams	For service to the arts as founder and Director of the Sydney Children's Choir and Gondwana Voices.	
The Reverend Patricia Aitken Williams	For service to the community of Darwin, particularly through the provision of chaplaincy and counselling services.	
Brett Duncan Williamson	For service to sports administration, particularly through Surf Life Saving Queensland.	
Cheryl Margaret Wilson	For service to the Guiding movement in Tasmania, and to junior athletics.	
James Clarence Wilson	For service to the community of Geeveston.	
Kenneth Albert Wilson	For service to children undergoing treatment for cancer as a volunteer with the Oncology Unit at the Children's Hospital at Westmead.	
Marlene Anne Wilson	For service to the community of North West Tasmania through the Guiding movement.	
Graham Edward Wiltshire	For service to the Tasmanian wine industry.	
Silas George Wood	For service to veterans and their families, particularly through the Windsor Sub-Branch of the Returned and Services League of Australia.	
Nancy Elizabeth Wood	For service to the community, particularly through the Port Pirie Branch of the National Trust.	
Peter Francis Wood	For service to the community of Traralgon.	
Dorothy Ada Wooll	For service to the community of Sydney.	
Ronald Samuel Workman	For service to the community, particularly through the Currumbin Palm Beach Sub-Branch of the Returned and Services League of Australia.	
Keith William Young	For service to the preservation and recording of Australia's military history.	

==== Military Division ====
Branch	Recipient	Citation	Notes
Navy	Commander Martin Stewart Campbell	For meritorious service, particularly in analysing, training and improving the Navy's operational forces.	
Navy	Warrant Officer Ian Edmond Harvey	For meritorious service in recruit training as the Warrant Officer Royal Australian Navy Recruit School.	
Navy	Lieutenant Commander Frederick John Ross	For meritorious service in operational planning, particularly in support of Operation FALCONER, and for services to the Australian Defence Forces amphibious warfare capabilities.	
Army	Warrant Officer Class Two Anthony Lawrence Bock	For meritorious performance in training in a range of senior Regimental appointments within the 12th/16th Hunter River Lancers.	
Army	Warrant Officer Class One Stephen Wiliam Doyle	For meritorious service to the Australian Defence Force as the Regimental Sergeant Major of the 31st Battalion, The Royal Queensland Regiment, The Land Command Battle School and the 2nd Battalion, The Royal Australian Regiment.	
Army	Warrant Officer Class Two Wayne Joseph Gest	For meritorious service in the development of Army communications, as the Supervisor Communications of the Joint Incident Response Unit, 5th Aviation Regiment and 103rd Signal Squadron.	
Army	Warrant Officer Class One Andrew Spencer Johnston	For meritorious service to the Australia Defence Force parachute capability and as the Operations Warrant Officer at the 176th Air Dispatch Squadron Royal Australian Air Force Base Richmond.	
Army	Major John David Walpole	For meritorious service, technical mastery and innovation to the Australian Army in the field of Catering.	
Air Force	Warrant Officer Stephen Scott Finch	For meritorious service as the Warrant Officer Engineer Number 38 Squadron and member of the Number 501 Wing Market Testing and Transition Management Team.	
Air Force	Squadron Leader Gary Gibbs	For meritorious service in the field of explosive ordnance policy, capability, safety and training as Officer-in-Charge of the Royal Australian Air Force School of Technical Trainings Explosives Ordnance Training Squadron.	
Air Force	Flight Sergeant Adam Edmund Smith	For meritorious performance as Senior Non-Commissioned Officer-In-Charge of Armament Sections at Number 3 Squadron and Number 2 Operational Conversion Unit, and while deployed on Operation SLIPPER with Number 77 Squadron.	
Dept of Defence	Donald Owen McDonald	For meritorious performance as the Resident Project Manager in Melbourne for the Defence Departments Jindalee Operational Radar Network (JORN) project.	
National Consultative Group of Service Families	Judith Anne Swann	For meritorious service as an advocate for improvement to the welfare and wellbeing of Defence families and representing their needs to Ministers, senior defence executives and the Australian community.	
