= Alan Lloyd bibliography =

- Books↙: 15
- Novels↙: 2
- A. R. Lloyd↙: 6

Alan Richard Lloyd (22 February 1927 – 12 April 2018), or A. R. Lloyd, was an English journalist, novelist, and historian. His adult work is published under the name Alan Lloyd, whilst his children's work is published under the name A. R. Lloyd. Although his most popular work, The Kine Saga—a fantasy trilogy centred on a least weasel named Kine—is fiction, the majority of Lloyd's books are non-fiction. His books have collectively been translated into six different languages.

== Non-fiction ==
- Lloyd, Alan (1964). The Drums of Kumasi: The Story of the Ashanti Wars. London, England: Longmans. OCLC 4952246.
  - — (December 1965). The Drums of Kumasi: The Story of the Ashanti Wars. London, England: Panther. OCLC 9593486.
- — (1966). The Year of the Conqueror. London, England: Longmans. OCLC 3260405.
  - — (1966). The Making of the King, 1066. New York, NY, USA: Holt, Rinehart and Winston. OCLC 407348.
  - — (1990). The Making of the King, 1066. New York, NY, USA: Dorset. ISBN 978-0-88029-473-7.
  - — (17 December 2024) [1966]. The Year of the Conqueror (eBook ed.). USA: HathiTrust Digital Library. OCLC 1466341709.
  - — (18 December 2024) [1990]. The Making of the King, 1066 (eBook ed.). USA: HathiTrust Digital Library. OCLC 645856321.
- — (1968). The Spanish Centuries: A Narrative History of Spain from Ferdinand and Isabella to Franco. Garden City, NY, USA: Doubleday. ISBN 978-0-385-00735-1.
  - — (5 February 2002). The Spanish Centuries: A Narrative History of Spain from Ferdinand and Isabella to Franco. Garden City, NY, USA: Doubleday. ISBN 978-0-385-50702-8.
  - — (18 December 2024) [1968]. The Spanish Centuries: A Narrative History of Spain from Ferdinand and Isabella to Franco (eBook ed.). USA: HathiTrust Digital Library. OCLC 586067501.
- — (1969). Franco. Garden City, NY, USA: Doubleday. OCLC 23749.
  - — (1970). Franco. London, England: Longmans. ISBN 978-0-582-10804-2.
  - — (5 February 2002). Franco: The Biography of an Enigma. Garden City, NY, USA: Doubleday. ISBN 978-0-385-50699-1.
  - — (17 December 2024) [1969]. Franco (eBook ed.). USA: HathiTrust Digital Library. OCLC 1489685626.
- — (1971). The King who Lost America: A Portrait of the Life and Times of George III. Garden City, NY, USA: Doubleday. ISBN 978-0-385-07346-2.
  - — (1971). The Wickedest Age: The Life and Times of George III. Newton Abbot, Devon, England: David & Charles. ISBN 978-0-7153-5549-7.
  - — (5 February 2002). The King who Lost America: A Portrait of the Life and Times of George III. Garden City, NY, USA: Doubleday. ISBN 978-0-385-50698-4.
  - — (27 February 2007) [1971]. The Wickedest Age: The Life and Times of George III (eBook ed.). USA: HathiTrust Digital Library. OCLC 1484146335.
  - — (22 January 2010) [1971]. The King who Lost America: A Portrait of the Life and Times of George III (eBook ed.). USA: HathiTrust Digital Library. OCLC 1419910630.
- — (1972). The Maligned Monarch: A Life of King John of England. Garden City, NY, USA: Doubleday. OCLC 482542.
  - — (1973). King John. Newton Abbot, Devon, England: David & Charles. ISBN 978-0-7153-5915-0.
  - — (1973). King John. Melbourne, Victoria, Australia: Wren. ISBN 978-0-85885-057-6.
- — (1973). The Zulu War, 1879. London, England: Hart-Davis, MacGibbon. ISBN 978-0-246-10560-8.
  - — (1973). The Zulu War, 1879. London, England: Military Book Society. OCLC 464142220.
  - — (18 December 2024) [1973]. The Zulu War, 1879 (eBook ed.). USA: HathiTrust Digital Library. OCLC 1485015361.
- — (1973). Marathon: The Story of Civilizations on Collision Course. New York, NY, USA: Random House. ISBN 978-0-394-48135-7.
  - — (1973). Marathon: The Story of Civilizations on Collision Course. New York, NY, USA: New American Library. OCLC 862311601.
  - — (1974). Marathon: The Story of Civilizations on Collision Course. London, England: Souvenir Press. ISBN 978-0-285-62151-0.
  - — (21 January 1975). Marathon. New York, NY, USA: Signet. ISBN 978-0-451-61359-2.
  - — (1975). Marathon: The Story of Civilizations on Collision Course. Newton Abbot, Devon, England: Readers Union. OCLC 3601300.
  - — (1975). Marathon: The Story of Civilizations on Collision Course. London, England: Souvenir Press. OCLC 829142939.
  - — (28 April 2005). Marathon: The Crucial Battle that Created Western Democracy. London, England: Souvenir Press. ISBN 978-0-285-63688-0.
  - — (April 2005). Marathon: The Crucial Battle that Created Western Democracy (eBook ed.). London, England: Souvenir Press. ISBN 978-0-285-64193-8.
  - — (26 June 2005). Marathon: The Story of Civilizations on Collision Course (eBook ed.). London, England: Souvenir Press. OCLC 1132335677.
  - — (27 June 2005). Marathon: The Crucial Battle that Created Western Democracy (eBook ed.). Chicago, Illinois, USA: Souvenir Press. OCLC 829461404.
  - — (2008). Marathon: The Story of Civilizations on Collision Course. London, England: Souvenir Press. OCLC 226974089.
  - — (1 May 2011). Marathon: The Crucial Battle that Created Western Democracy (eBook ed.). London, England: Souvenir Press. ISBN 978-0-285-64027-6.
  - — (11 December 2017) [1973]. Marathon: The Story of Civilizations on Collision Course (eBook ed.). USA: HathiTrust Digital Library. OCLC 1482661389.
- — (1974). The Scorching of Washington: the War of 1812. Newton Abbot, Devon, England: David & Charles. ISBN 978-0-7153-6657-8.
  - — (January 1975). The Scorching of Washington: the War of 1812. Washington, USA: R. B. Luce. ISBN 978-0-88331-070-0.
  - — (18 December 2024) [1974]. The Scorching of Washington: the War of 1812 (eBook ed.). USA: HathiTrust Digital Library. OCLC 563979791.
- — (1975). The Taras report on the last days of Pompeii. London, England: Souvenir Press. ISBN 978-0-285-62183-1.
  - — (1 July 1979). Alive in the Last Days of Pompeii. Los Angeles, California, USA: Pinnacle Books. ISBN 978-0-523-40612-1.
  - — (5 July 2005). Pompeii's Secrets: The Taras Report on Its Last Days (eBook ed.). London, England: Souvenir Press. ISBN 978-0-285-64234-8.
- — (1976). The War in the Trenches. New York, NY, USA: David McKay. ISBN 978-0-679-50716-1.
  - — (1976). The War in the Trenches. London, England: Hart-Davis, MacGibbon. ISBN 978-0-246-10805-0.
  - — (1976). The War in the Trenches. London, England: Book Club Associates. OCLC 35753717.
  - — (c. 2001). The War in the Trenches. Ware, Hertfordshire, England: Wordsworth Military Library. ISBN 978-1-84022-237-1.
- — (1977). Destroy Carthage!: The Death Throes of an Ancient Culture. London, England: Souvenir Press. ISBN 978-0-285-62235-7.
  - — (1977). Destroy Carthage!: The Death Throes of an Ancient Culture. London, England: Book Club Associates. OCLC 1313867285.
  - — (6 November 2008) [1977]. Destroy Carthage!: The Death Throes of an Ancient Culture (eBook ed.). USA: HathiTrust Digital Library. OCLC 1491000133.
- — (1977). The Great Prize Fight. London, England: Cassell, Orion Publishing Group. ISBN 978-0-304-29780-1.
  - — (1977). The Great Prize Fight. New York, NY, USA: Coward, McCann & Geoghegan. ISBN 978-0-698-10829-5.
  - — (24 December 1992) [1977]. The Great Prize Fight (Audiobook ed.). Sydney, NSW, Australia: Australian Listening Library. OCLC 221796822.
  - — (September 2004). The Great Prize Fight. London, England: Souvenir Press. ISBN 978-0-285-63705-4.
- — (1977). The Hundred Years War. London, England: Hart-Davis, MacGibbon. ISBN 978-2-246-10869-6.
  - — (1977). The Hundred Years War. London, England: Book Club Associates. ISBN 978-0-246-10869-2.
  - — (27 April 2010) [1977]. The Hundred Years War (eBook ed.). USA: HathiTrust Digital Library. OCLC 1506171892.
- — (June 1982). The Gliders: The Story of the Wooden Chariots of World War II. Nashville, Tennessee, USA: Battery Press. ISBN 978-0-89839-066-7.
  - — (1982). The Gliders. London, England: Leo Cooper, with Secker & Warburg. ISBN 978-0-436-25470-3.
  - — (1984). The Gliders. London, England: Corgi. ISBN 978-0-552-12167-5.
  - — (1989). The Gliders. London, England: Arrow. ISBN 978-0-09-957460-6.
  - — (18 December 2024) [1982]. The Gliders (eBook ed.). USA: HathiTrust Digital Library. OCLC 1483799203.

== Fiction ==
=== Adults' fiction ===
- Lloyd, Alan (1972). The Eighteenth Concubine. London, England: Hutchinson. ISBN 978-0-09-109490-4.
- — (1979). Trade Imperial. London, England: Cassell, Orion Publishing Group. ISBN 978-0-304-30310-6.
  - — (1979). Trade Imperial. New York, NY, USA: Coward, McCann & Geoghegan. ISBN 978-0-698-10970-4.
  - — (1981). Trade Imperial. Feltham, England: Hamlyn Paperbacks. ISBN 978-0-600-20237-0.

=== Children's fiction (as A. R. Lloyd) ===
- A. R. Lloyd (1984). The Last Otter. Illustrated by Douglas Hall. London, England: Hutchinson. ISBN 978-0-09-158470-2.
  - — (June 1985). The Boy and the Otter. New York, NY, USA: Holt, Rinehart and Winston. ISBN 978-0-03-004434-2.
  - — (1985). The Last Otter. London, England: Hamlyn Paperbacks. ISBN 978-0-09-935620-2.
  - — (March 2004). The Last Otter (Large Print ed.). Leicester, England: Ulverscroft. ISBN 978-1-84395-233-6.
  - — (10 June 2005) [1984]. The Last Otter. Voiced by Anne Fraser. (Audiobook ed.). Sydney, NSW, Australia: Australian Listening Library. OCLC 220006520.
- — (1986). The Farm Dog. London, England: Century. ISBN 978-0-7126-9513-8.
  - — (1987). The Farm Dog. London, England: Arrow. ISBN 978-0-09-951500-5.
  - — (1991) [1987]. The Farm Dog (Braille ed.). Brisbane, QLD, Australia: Queensland Braille Writing Association. OCLC 220672319.
  - — (December 2002). The Farm Dog (Large Print ed.). Leicester, England: Ulverscroft. ISBN 978-0-7089-4763-0.
- — (1993). Wingfoot. England: Grafton. ISBN 978-0-586-21146-5.
  - — (November 1994). Wingfoot (Large Print ed.). Leicester, England: Ulverscroft. ISBN 978-0-7089-3188-2.

==== The Kine Saga ====
- A. R. Lloyd (1982). Kine. Feltham, England: Hamlyn Paperbacks. ISBN 978-0-600-20467-1.
  - — (1982). Kine. New York, NY, USA: St. Martin's Press. ISBN 978-0-312-45405-0.
  - — (1987) [1982]. Kine. Voiced by Anne Fraser. (Audiobook ed.). Sydney, NSW, Australia: Australian Listening Library. OCLC 220112535.
  - — (1990). Marshworld. London, England: Arrow. ISBN 978-0-09-968160-1.
  - — (2005). Kine (Large Print ed.). Leicester, England: Ulverscroft. ISBN 978-1-84395-554-2.
- — (1989). Witchwood. London, England: Muller. ISBN 978-0-09-173940-9.
  - — (1990). Witchwood. London, England: Arrow. ISBN 978-0-09-953840-0.
- — (1990). Dragonpond. London, England: Muller. ISBN 978-0-09-173980-5.
  - — (1991). Dragon Pond. London, England: Arrow. ISBN 978-0-09-969930-9.

== International versions ==
=== Non-fiction ===
- Lloyd, Alan (1970). España a través de los siglos [Spain through the centuries] (in Spanish). Esplugues de Llobregat, Barcelona, Spain: Plaza & Janés. OCLC 992013003. (Note: Translated from The Spanish Centuries.)
- — (c. 1975). La politique de Franco, (1939-1946) [Franco's policies (1939-1946)] (in French). Montreal, Canada: Ecole sociale populaire. OCLC 1264812493. (Note: Translated from Franco.)
- — (1983). Karutago: kodai bōeki taikoku no metsubō カルタゴ : 古代貿易大国の滅亡 [Carthage: The Fall of an Ancient Trading Power] (in Japanese). Tokyo, Japan: 河出書房新社. ISBN 978-4-309-22014-7. (Note: Translated from Destroy Carthage: The Death Throes of an Ancient Culture.)
- — (May 1985). Ayaushi kūtei butai 危うし空挺部隊 [Paratroopers in Danger] (in Japanese). Translated by Ishikawa, Yoshimi. Tokyo, Japan: 朝日ソノラマ. ISBN 978-4-257-17056-3. (Note: Translated from The Gliders.)
- — (1992). Karutago: kodai bōeki taikoku no metsubō カルタゴ : 古代貿易大国の滅亡 [Carthage: The Fall of an Ancient Trading Power] (in Japanese). Translated by Kimoto, Akiko. Tokyo, Japan: 河出書房新社. ISBN 978-4-309-22226-4.
- — (2004). Maratona [Marathon] (in Brazilian Portuguese). Brazil: Ediouro Publicações. ISBN 978-85-00-01487-1. (Note: Translated from Marathon.)

=== Fiction ===
- A. R. Lloyd (1984). Het land van Knai [The Land of Kine] (in Dutch). Translated by Kuipers, Hugo. Utrecht, Netherlands: Het Spectrum. ISBN 978-90-274-5783-7. (Note: Translated from Kine.)
- — (1984). Das Tal der Wiesel: Roman [The Valley of the Weasels: A Novel] (in German). Translated by von Gernot Barschke. Germany: Von Schröder. ISBN 978-3-547-76127-6. (Note: Translated from Kine.)
- — (1986). Am Fluss der Otter "Lut": Roman [On the River of the Otters "Lut": A Novel] (in German). Translated by von Gernot Barschke. Düsseldorf, Germany: Von Schröder. ISBN 978-3-547-76124-5. (Note: Translated from The Last Otter. Note that "Lut" is the name of the protagonist.)
