= Oades =

Oades is a surname. Notable people with the surname include:

- J. Malcolm Oades, soil scientist
- Lindsay Oades, Australian wellbeing public policy strategist, author, researcher and academic
- Sydney A. Oades (1890–1961), British World War I flying ace
