= Elizabeth Taylor (disambiguation) =

Elizabeth Taylor (1932–2011) was a British and American actress.

Elizabeth Taylor or Liz Taylor may also refer to:

- Elizabeth Taylor (poet) (c. 1660–1708), aka Lady Wythens, later Colepeper, English Restoration poet
- Elizabeth Taylor (1831–1887), one of the names of Happy Ned, a woman who fought as a man in the American Civil War
- Elizabeth Taylor (painter) (1856–1932), American artist, journalist, and botanist
- Elizabeth Taylor (social reformer) (1868–1941), New Zealand temperance worker, community leader and social reformer
- Elizabeth Taylor (novelist) (1912–1975), English novelist and short story writer
- Elizabeth Taylor (engineer), Australian civil engineer and academic
- Frances Taylor Davis (1929–2018), American dancer and actress who was credited on Broadway as Elizabeth Taylor
- Elisabeth Russell Taylor (1930–2020), English novelist and short story writer
- Libby Taylor (1902–1961), African American character actress
- Liz Taylor (American Horror Story), an American Horror Story: Hotel character
- Liz Taylor (Hollyoaks) or Liz Burton, a character on Hollyoaks
- "Elizabeth Taylor" (song), by Taylor Swift from her 2025 album The Life of a Showgirl
- "Elizabeth Taylor", a song by Clare Maguire from her 2016 album Stranger Things Have Happened
- "Elizabeth Taylor", a song by Pete Yorn from his 2022 album Hawaii

== See also ==
- Betty Taylor (disambiguation)
- Eliza Taylor (born 1989), Australian actress
- Lizz Tayler (born 1990), American pornographic actress
- Beth Taylor (born 1993), Scottish operatic mezzo-soprano
