= Margot Prior =

Australian psychologist and autism researcher (1937–2020)

Margot Prior AO FASSA
- Born: 24 March 1937; Melbourne, Victoria, Australia
- Died: 24 August 2020 (aged 83)
- Other name: Margot Ruth Hansen

Academic background
- Education: University of Melbourne
- Alma mater: Monash University

Academic work
- Discipline: Psychologist
- Sub-discipline: Autism, literacy development
- Institutions: University of Melbourne; Royal Children's Hospital; La Trobe University

Margot Ruth Prior AO FASSA (24 March 1937 – 24 August 2020) was an Australian psychologist, educator, and musician. She was professor of psychology at the University of Melbourne where her research focused on autism and literacy development. She was also director of psychology at the Royal Children's Hospital and was adjunct professor at La Trobe University.

== Biography ==
Prior was born on 24 March 1937, in Melbourne, Victoria. She graduated from the University of Melbourne with a BMus and a BA. She completed an MSc and PhD at Monash University and took up an academic position at La Trobe University in 1976. She was the inaugural Chair of the Advisory Committee of Australia's first autism research centre at La Trobe, the Olga Tennison Autism Research Centre, established in 2008, and held this position until her 80th year. The Victorian Autism Specific Early Learning and Care centre at La Trobe was named after her in recognition of her long contribution to autism intervention science and service.

Prior was elected a Fellow of the Academy of the Social Sciences in Australia in 1992. She was awarded a DSc (honoris causa) by the University of Melbourne and was a Fellow of the Australian Psychological Society.

In the 2004 Australia Day Honours, Prior was made an Officer of the Order of Australia for "service to the discipline of psychology in the areas of developmental and clinical psychology and for research leading to significant advances in the care and treatment of children with autism, learning difficulties and anxiety disorders". She was Victorian Senior Australian of the Year in 2006.

== Selected works ==
- Prior, Margot R (1996), Understanding specific learning difficulties, Psychology Press, ISBN 978-0-86377-712-7
- Prior, Margot R (5 August 2004), Learning and behavior problems in Asperger syndrome, Guilford Press (published 2003), ISBN 978-1-59385-077-7
- Richardson, Sue; Prior, Margot R, eds. (2005), No time to lose: The wellbeing of Australia's children, Melbourne University Publishing, ISBN 978-0-522-85223-3
- Prior, Margot R (2015), Margot's memoirs, North Fitzroy, Victoria Black Pepper, ISBN 978-1-876044-91-6

== Personal life ==
Prior's first husband was musician Glenthorne Prior, who drowned when their three children were young. She later married John Hansen.

She died from COVID-19 on 24 August 2020, during the COVID-19 pandemic in Australia.
