= Mary Beasley =

Australian public servant

Mary Beasley AM
- Born: 3 April 1933; Glenelg, South Australia
- Died: 23 September 2024 (aged 91)
- Education: St Peter's Girls' School

Mary Constance Beasley AM (3 April 1933 – 23 September 2024) was an Australian public servant and business executive. She was Australia's first Commissioner for Equal Opportunity (appointed 1975) and first woman Ombudsman (appointed 1985).

== Career ==
Born in Glenelg, South Australia on 3 April 1933, Beasley was educated at St Peter's Girls' School, graduating with honours in the leaving certificate. Her first job was in the marketing department of the Vacuum Oil Company (now Mobil), which she left to move to Sydney, following her marriage at age 19. The marriage was short-lived and she returned to Adelaide with her two-year-old son. Encouraged by her mother, she returned to the workforce in 1968, joining an employment agency managed by J.P. Young. He mentored her by challenging her to take risks and she rose to become general manager of the agency. Beasley also served two terms on Unley Council.

Beasley was appointed South Australia's first Commissioner for Equal Opportunity, taking up the position in 1976. After only 18 months in the role she transferred to the Public Service Board in February 1978, again as a commissioner.

She was appointed to the board of Qantas in August 1983 by Kim Beazley (then Minister for Aviation) – another first for women.

Beasley served as chairwoman of the board of the Australian Dance Theatre in the 1990s. She also chaired the committee that planned the celebration of 100 years of women's suffrage in South Australia in 1994.

In the 2004 Australia Day Honours, Beasley was appointed a Member of the Order of Australia for "service to public sector administration in South Australia and to the community, particularly as an executive member of organisations in the fields of the arts, education, health and community celebrations".

Beasley died on 23 September 2024. The Hon. Susan Close paid tribute to Beasley in the South Australian House of Assembly on 26 September, noting her "great strength and tenacity" and that her "impressive and nationally significant legacy will live on".
