= Betty Taylor =

Betty Taylor may refer to:

- Betty Taylor (athlete) (1916–1977), Canadian Olympic athlete
- Betty Taylor (actress) (1919–2011), American actress and performer
- Betty Taylor (community advocate) (born 1949), Australian community advocate and domestic violence prevention campaigner
- Betty Loo Taylor (1929–2016), American jazz pianist and musician
- Betty Blayton Taylor (1937–2016), American activist, artist and lecturer

== See also ==
- Elizabeth Taylor (disambiguation)
