= Norman McCall Tulloh =

Australian agricultural scientist (1922–2019)

Norman McCall Tulloh (22 April 1922 – 5 December 2019) was an Australian agricultural scientist, academic, and World War II veteran. He achieved international recognition in animal husbandry and made significant contributions to agricultural research, particularly through his long academic career at the University of Melbourne. He was appointed a Member of the Order of Australia in 2004 for his service to agricultural science.

== Early life and education ==
Tulloh was born in Horsham, Victoria, to Ivan Tulloh and Eliza Tulloh (née McCall). He grew up at Longerenong Agricultural College, where his father served as principal during the 1930s. After attending Dooen Primary School and Horsham High School, he enrolled in agricultural science at the University of Melbourne in 1940, residing at Ormond College.

His university studies were interrupted by World War II. Tulloh enlisted in the Australian Army, serving in Papua New Guinea and Darwin. After the war, he returned to complete a Master of Agricultural Science degree, awarded in 1951.

== Career ==
In 1952, Tulloh was appointed from CSIRO to serve as Australia's scientific liaison officer at the Australian High Commission in London. There he met and later married Ailsa Robertson, a Brisbane-born chemistry graduate.

Upon returning to Australia, Tulloh was appointed senior lecturer at the University of Melbourne in 1957. He completed his PhD on interbreed body composition in cattle, conferred in 1963. He co-authored the influential textbook Agricultural Science – An Introduction for Australian Students and Farmers, which became a standard reference in schools and colleges for two decades.

Tulloh played a leading role in international agricultural collaboration, particularly in Southeast Asia. In 1972, he participated in the Australian–Asian Universities Co-operation Scheme (AAUCS), becoming its academic director in 1978. There, he fostered research projects in Indonesia.

He was appointed Professor of Animal Production in 1974, and awarded a Doctor of Agricultural Science in 1975. As Dean of the Faculty of Agriculture and Forestry (1976–1978), Tulloh supervised over 80 postgraduate theses, and authored or co-authored five books and more than 100 scholarly publications. He was elected Fellow of the Australian Academy of Technological Sciences and Engineering (AATSE) in 1981, he was made Emeritus Professor in 1987.

== Military writings and personal life ==
Tulloh documented his wartime experiences in two books: Darwin 1942: An Army Truck Driver's Diary from World War II, and Letters Home (1943–45), based on his service in the 41st Australian Landing Craft Company. He also edited for publication the World War I diary of his father, who served in the 23rd Battalion, 6th Infantry Brigade, 2nd Division of the AIF. Copies of these works are held at the Australian War Memorial.

From the 1960s, Tulloh experienced progressive hearing loss. In his mid-60s, he received a cochlear implant, becoming one of the oldest recipients under the care of Graeme Clark at the Royal Victorian Eye and Ear Hospital. His treatment contributed to cochlear implant research for 25 years.

As founding secretary of the Darwin Defenders, which was formed 1998 to commemorate the 1942 bombing of Darwin, he remained active in the organization throughout his later years.

== Honours ==
- President, Australian Society of Animal Production (1976-'78)
- Fellow, Australian Academy of Technological Sciences and Engineering (1981)
- Fellow, Australian Society of Animal Production (1982)
- Emeritus Professor, University of Melbourne (1987)
- Member of the Order of Australia (AM), 2004 – for service to agricultural science as a researcher, educator, and administrator
