= Alan Lloyd =

English writer (1927–2018)

- Lloyd in September 1954
- Born: 22 February 1927; London, England
- Died: 12 April 2018 (aged 91)
- Education: Kingston School of Art
- Occupations: Journalist; novelist; historian
- Spouse: Daphne Lloyd (née Chaffe)
- Children: 1
- Writing career
- Pen name: A. R. Lloyd
- Language: English
- Years active: 1962–1993
- Period: 1964–1990
- Notable work: The Kine Saga

Alan Richard Lloyd (22 February 1927 – 12 April 2018) was an English writer. He was a journalist, novelist, and historian, and is most famous for his Kine Saga fantasy books. Lloyd also wrote adult fiction and non-fiction, most notably on the history of the British monarchy. His adult work is published under the name Alan Lloyd, whilst his children's work is published under A. R. Lloyd. His books have collectively been translated into six different languages.

== Personal life ==
Alan Lloyd was born on 22 February 1927 in London. He studied drawing and painting at the Kingston School of Art before being called up to the army in 1945, where he served with the Royal Fusiliers.

Lloyd was married to Daphne Lloyd; they had one son. For over 20 years, he resided at Pilgrims Cottage, a Grade II listed building in Warehorne, Kent.

He died on 12 April 2018 at the age of 91.

== Career ==
Lloyd started his writing career at the Jersey Evening Post and worked as a freelance journalist before becoming a full-time writer in 1962. His first book, published by Longmans in 1964, was The Drums of Kumasi, a non-fiction account of the Ashanti Wars. This was followed in 1966 by The Year of the Conqueror, a study of the events and people leading up to the Norman invasion of England in 1066. Further non-fiction work followed on the history of Spain, George III, King John and the Zulu War. His first fiction work, The Eighteenth Concubine, was published in 1972, and Kine—the first of his Kine Saga novels—was published in 1982. Wingfoot, his final book, was published in 1993.

== Critical reception ==
Alan Lloyd's works have been reviewed by a number of critics.

=== Reviews of non-fiction books ===
The Drums of Kumasi (Note: Longmans, 1964), according to one reviewer, follows "one of the most bizarre [wars] in British colonial history", and that "Alan Lloyd does full justice to the gruesome story." However, they also highlighted the lack of "a voice from the ranks to supplement the accounts of ... Winwood Reade and H. M. Stanley". In another review, it was described as "an account of these campaigns which exploits their comic opera qualities and ... manages to convey some ... of the ... bloodiness of foot sloggin' over Africa." His depiction of Garnet Wolseley was also praised: "Lloyd, although inclined at times to judge his Victorians too harshly, gives Sir Garnet full credit for ... his military abilities." In the view of the critic, "The Drums of Kumasi ... reads like a historical satire, [with] the facts of the story provid[ing] a rich mixture of horror and adventure".

The Making of the King: 1066 (Note: Holt, Rinehart & Winston, 1966) was compared favourably to Eric Linklater's Conquest of England (Note: Doubleday, 1966), and commended for both "[managing] to present an abundance of material at an unhurried pace", and "his details—of the social systems of the nations, the type of weaponry used, the ultimate battle—[that] add scope and interest beyond the story of the men." A different review stated that it "made [a] real contribution to our over-all understanding of the event" thanks to the "inclusion in his account many details of the actual conditions of life in England at the time of the Conquest". Writing for the New York Herald Tribune, Alan Pryce-Jones called it an "absorbing book", and that "the steady thump of battle is heard in every chapter". Pryce-Jones writes that due to "... the attrition of nearly a thousand years even the landscapes ... [of the book] have been made unrecognizable by time". Therefore, according to Pryce-Jones, "all the more credit, then, to Mr. Lloyd for discovering a shape and a texture to his stoгу." Another review of the book labelled it "a really masterful account of ... the royal stage of 11th-century England", further asserting that "Alan Lloyd breathes life and fire back into personages dead for 900 years." The critic named the "enliven[ment of] characters ... [beyond] good guys and bad guys", as well as the "translation of scholarly story ... into highly readable matter" as factors resulting in "fascinating reading".

Described as "staunchly interesting", The Spanish Centuries (Note: Doubleday, 1968) was praised for its "revisionary interpretation of Ferdinand and Isabella, ... Columbus and ... Cortez, and ... Simon Bolivar." However, the critic panned Lloyd's "distribution of space and attention" as "...nineteenth century Cuba and the present Franco regime do not get their due." A review in the San Bernardino Sun stated that the book covers "every significant landmark of Spanish history since 1492".

Franco (Note: Doubleday, 1969) divided critics. One reviewer characterised Lloyd's approach as "a journalistic rather than seriously analytic perspective". Furthermore, they state "[Franco is] light reading, then – it's hard to say for whom, given the ... accessibility of [Hills' (Note: ISBN 978-0-7091-0171-0) or Crozier's (Note: ISBN 978-0-413-26770-2)] more extensive recent studies." Another scathingly described Franco "as pedestrian and uninspiring as its non-smoking, non-drinking, puritanical non-hero", and called the book "remarkably uninformative". Lloyd's use of "journalistic cliches", in the opinion of the reviewer, is "a desperate sign of failure." Conversely, a review in the Rocky Mountain News described Franco as "a fascinating biography of the enigmatic Generalissimo combined with an informative and lucid interpretation of Spain's political history over the last 70 years." The reviewer praised Lloyd's decision to avoid "speculat[ing] on the probable course of politic[s] in Spain after Franco's passing", and for his "willing[ness] to rely upon history as the ultimate judge of the Franco era". Lastly, the reviewer expresses that Lloyd's "study of Franco is written with exceptional clarity and readability."

The King Who Lost America: A Portrait of the Life and Times of George III (Note: Doubleday, 1971), a "spirited biography", was complimented for its "attention [to] various ... Whig sycophants and ministers, ... and on the King's innumerable brothers, sisters, and children". Lloyd, in the view of one critic, "manages to convey the vainglorious, self-seeking jobbery of the age"; the inclusion of the "French Wars, Irish Rebellions, the Gordon Riots and ... [industrialisation]" were also praised. While Lloyd was reproved for a lack of "original research", the critic described the book as "a light ... overview" and "rewarding". The Cameron Herald labelled it "a highly entertaining portrait". The book (Note: ISBN 978-0-7153-5549-7) was directly compared to Stanley Ayling's George the Third (Note: ISBN 978-0-394-48169-2) by The Times Literary Supplement, who called it "a lighter and not always water-tight vessel, that ... [unlike Ayling's,] gives the reader a voyage over the darker waters of English life." James Grieve, writing for the Canberra Times, also compared The Wickedest Age to Ayling's George the Third', as well as to John Brooke's King George III (Note: ISBN 978-0-09-456110-6), and John Clarke's The Life and Times of George III (Note: ISBN 978-0-297-99437-4). Grieve labelled Ayling's and Brooke's novels as "works of original scholarship, written primarily for specialists", while Lloyd's book was comparatively "a frankly derivative work, aimed at the general reader but soundly documented". The review also compared the physical qualities of the books: "The Collins (Note: Ayling) and Constable (Note: Brooke) volumes ... are a joy to handle, impeccably printed, fine and massive; the David and Charles (Note: Lloyd), although well produced, has a more utility feel to it and there is a faint misty greyness to the print which makes one think one is reading in a poor light." Grieve writes that "Messrs Lloyd and Clarke have written what seem to me very good books of their type. The amateur historian in search of a readable and reliable introduction to... [the] age could do much worse than begin with Alan Lloyd or John Clarke." However, Grieve faults Lloyd's book for its coverage on "the king's illness", for his "recommend[ation of] Guttmacher's 30-year-old work on George's 'madness'" and as "[besides] one passing mention of porphyria, [he] says next to nothing on this rare disease".

In The Maligned Monarch: A Life of King John of England (Note: ISBN 978-0-385-07346-2), labelled "his best book to date", Lloyd makes "a compelling argument" that the issues of King John's reign were "inherited from the reigns of his brother, ... and father", though the book, according to the critic, overlooks King John's "manic-depressive tendencies". The book was also lauded for "the author's detailed interpretation of ... the Magna Carta as an over-mythologized document regressively asserting feudal privilege". The Maligned Monarch was characterised as "a surprisingly readable and fair-minded" interpretation of King John. In another review, the book was praised for its "detailed research ... [that] paints a new, unique picture of King John of England as a non-monstrous and actually culturally progressive ruler", and dubbed an "engrossing biography".

Criticised for "devot[ing] half his book to Persia's imperial predecessors", Marathon: The Story of Civilizations on Collision Course (Note: ISBN 978-0-394-48135-7) was branded "a disappointment." The subtitle also came under fire for "... suggesting ... [a] clash between civilizations and cultures ... not borne out by his own narrative". Lloyd's description of the Greeks "is better", though "... he tends to idealize them". Mary Renault penned a different view of the book, writing that "nothing I know of ... has set out so vividly the backgrounds and contrasted traditions of the two great civilizations which were to clash at Marathon." (Note: Appears on the front of the 2005 edition of the book. ISBN 978-0-285-63688-0)

Lloyd's narration in The War in the Trenches (Note: ISBN 978-0-679-50716-1) was described as "interesting, if only for the factual material he has amassed." The use of photographs within the book was also praised: "an excellent selection of photographs." However, the critic was primarily negative, writing that "his writing ... rarely rises above the pedestrian" and labelling it an "arid text".

The Great Prize Fight (Note: ISBN 978-0-698-10829-5) received glowing praise from one critic, who dubbed it "... [a] smashing success." Additionally, Lloyd's "extract[ion] of ... bloodlust and ... swagger from contemporary press accounts" was applauded, with the critic stating that it "... make[s] for spectacular reading." A review in the New York Times also gave high praise, describing the book as "a splendid piece of popular history". They write: "when I first started Alan Lloyd's 'The Great Prize Fight' my admiration for the exactness of his historical research was matched only by my amazement that he bothered to do it in the first place." The reviewer characterised Lloyd as "a first‐rate popular historian who knows how to sell a story and he makes it not merely interesting but engrossing." They also state that "I can't remember many adventure novels with a more exciting finish than Lloyd's meticulously crafted history".

The Hundred Years War (Note: ISBN 978-2-246-10869-6) received a lengthy review from Veronica Sen in the Canberra Times. Sen praised "the racy style, the uncontroversial analysis, and the beautiful illustrations" of the book, and that "[though] Lloyd does not mention ... the Wars of the Roses[,] ... [he] does point out that the long War acted as a solvent on feudalism both within France and England and between the two countries." Sen also complimented the tone of the book, writing "Lloyd's account proves that a consideration of the place in history of the English longbow or the cannon that blew England out of France at Formigny can still afford some excitement." Lastly, Sen wrote that "despite the limitations of its genre, the book has much to recommend it" including an "unflinching ... delineation of the brutalities of the War" and that "sensational details of the War relished by the chroniclers are kept to a minimum." However, Sen criticised the framing of the conflict: "though aware of ... Edouard Perroy['s study] the author is incapable of seeing the string of conflicts ... through anything but English eyes." Additionally, Lloyd's ability as a historian was questioned, with Sen writing that "had he been a better historian he would shown that the 1450 battle of Formigny was as least as significant as Agincourt ... and he would have emphasised the changing nature of the War ... [from] a feudal struggle ... [to] a dynastic struggle". The review also mentioned the appearance of Joan of Arc: Sen states that "Lloyd gives limited attention to [Joan of Arc's] place in the War." According to the review, "only faintly does Lloyd hint at the rumblings behind the scenes ... instead he concentrates on the decline of chivalric values and the growth of national sentiment." Veronica Sen summarises her review by writing that "Lloyd's book is worth reading. Though the enthusiast would need to look elswhere to understand ... [its] full nature [,] ... this account of the War might spark off that search".

=== Reviews of fiction books ===
The Eighteenth Concubine (Note: ISBN 978-0-09-109490-4) was described as "highly entertaining", with the reviewer calling the plot "fascinating".

Trade Imperial (Note: ISBN 978-0-698-10970-4) received a positive review for its "high moral tone" and the "accuracy of the dialogue"; these, the reviewer states, "distinguish this from similar sagas". Another critic wrote that "Lloyd's talents are truly impressive, although he has a tendency to draw characterizations too narrowly." The critic also wrote that "the sequences set in the English countryside are especially delightful and betray the author's great love for that region."

The Last Otter (Note: ISBN 978-0-03-004434-2) was labelled a "sterling-hearted English nature epic" and complimented for its "rich ... natural detail and ... sentiments dear to the hearts of Anglophilic preservationists". Vortex Books called the book "an enthralling new wildlife adventure", written "with all the evocative skill that made Kine a bestseller". Conversely, a review in the Birmingham Science Fiction Group Newsletter compared The Last Otter to Tarka the Otter, negatively characterising it as an "attempt to bring Tarka the Otter up to date", one that "fail[ed] miserably." While the reviewer praised Lloyd's approach to human–animal interaction in Kine, but called it "a mess" in The Last Otter. The reviewer also criticised the book for being "overwritten" as "rarely do the otters swim but rather travel, plunge, vector, breast, stroke or surge", and Lloyd's book is torn between "the story of an otter struggling for survival against poachers, pollution and other threats ... or the tale of the run-away boy determined to protect them." The reviewer wrote that "This mish-mash, though of laudable conservationalist intent, does not succeed."

"Lloyd's third animal saga ... is also his weakest" was the conclusion of one critic reviewing The Farm Dog (Note: ISBN 978-0-7126-9513-8). They recommend it to "canine fanatics only – or [to] readers fond of lengthy descriptions of English farming life circa 1940."

Reviewing Dragonpond (Note: ISBN 978-0-09-173980-5) in 1991, Kirkus Reviews praised Lloyd's "mesmerizing tribute to the beauties and hidden ways of the flora and fauna of woods", but criticised the dialogue, comparing it to a "WW II B-movie".

== Works ==
The following list includes only the first editions of each book written by Alan Lloyd.

=== Non-fiction ===
- The Drums of Kumasi. (1964)
- The Year of the Conqueror. (1966)
- The Spanish Centuries: A Narrative History of Spain from Ferdinand and Isabella to Franco. (1968)
- Franco. (1969)
- The King Who Lost America: A Portrait of the Life and Times of George III. (1971)
- The Maligned Monarch: A Life of King John of England. (1972)
- The Zulu War, 1879. (1973)
- Marathon: The Story of Civilizations on Collision Course. (1973)
- The Scorching of Washington: The War of 1812. (1974)
- The Taras Report on the Last Days of Pompeii. (1975)
- The War in the Trenches. (1976)
- Destroy Carthage: The Death Throes of an Ancient Culture. (1977)
- The Great Prize Fight. (1977)
- The Hundred Years' War. (1977)
- The Gliders: The Story of the Wooden Chariots of World War II. (1982)

=== Children's fiction (as A. R. Lloyd) ===
- The Last Otter. (1984)
- The Farm Dog. (1986)
- Wingfoot. (1993)

==== The Kine Saga ====
- Kine. (1982)
- Witchwood. (1989)
- Dragonpond. (1990)

=== Adults' fiction ===
- The Eighteenth Concubine. (1972)
- Trade Imperial. (1979)
