= The Kine Saga =

Novel trilogy by Alan Lloyd

The Kine Saga is a heroic fantasy trilogy written by British author A. R. Lloyd (Alan Richard Lloyd). It comprises Kine (also published as Marshworld), Witchwood and Dragonpond (also published as Dragon Pond), and chronicles the life of a wild least weasel named Kine. The name "Kine" comes from an Old English word for the weasel.

== Background ==
Lloyd stated that he drew upon the countryside around his home to write Kine:

About the furious adventures of Kine I have created the mythology of a kingdom on the one hand mysterious, on the other—at least to lovers of the English countryside—familiar in detail and atmosphere. Largely descriptive of the acres surrounding the Kentish farmhouse I occupied with my wife for twenty years, the Kine tales are told with an economical simplicity characteristic of a pretension-phobic writer whose books have appealed, in a variety of languages, not only to large numbers of adults but to older children.

== Publication ==
The first novel, Kine, was originally published in England in 1982 by Hamlyn, and was published the same year in the United States by St. Martin's Press. The sequel, Witchwood, was first published by Muller in 1989; it was followed by the third and final book, Dragonpond, published by Muller in 1990. Also in 1990, Arrow republished Kine as Marshworld, and republished Witchwood under its original title. Dragonpond was retitled Dragon Pond in its 1991 republication by Arrow. Lastly, in 2005, Ulverscroft published Kine as a large-print edition.

Douglas Hall illustrated the Muller editions, while the Arrow editions—Marshworld, Witchwood, and Dragon Pond—were illustrated by John Barber.

== Plot summary ==
=== Kine ===
Kine
- Cover of the first edition of Kine
- Author: A. R. Lloyd
- Cover artist: Douglas Hall
- Language: English
- Series: The Kine Saga
- Release number: 1
- Genre: Fantasy novel
- Publisher: Hamlyn, St. Martin's Press, Ulverscroft
- Publication date: 1982
- Publication place: Feltham, England
- Media type: Print (Paperback)
- Pages: 256
- ISBN: 978-0-600-20467-1
- OCLC: 16599411
- Dewey Decimal: 823/.914 Fic 19
- LC Class: PR6062.L57 K5 1982 (first US edition)
- Followed by: Witchwood

The novel is divided into three parts: "Kine's Country", "Kia", and "The Dandy Hounds".

Kine is a least weasel who lives alone beneath the roots of the Life Tree, an old fallen willow. A proud, boastful creature, he has a few acquaintances: Watchman, a cynical old rook; Scrat, a shrew who is more nuisance than friend; and Kia, a bright young female weasel who seeks Kine's companionship. Kine initially spurns her affections, but he comes to respect Kia when she risks her life to rescue him from an owl.

The two weasels become inseparable, creating a den beneath the Life Tree and parenting five kits. Content with this idyllic lifestyle, Kine is unaware of the brutal mink Gru and her followers, who are intent on invading the forest.

=== Witchwood ===
Witchwood
- Author: A. R. Lloyd
- Cover artist: Douglas Hall
- Language: English
- Series: The Kine Saga
- Release number: 2
- Genre: Fantasy novel
- Publisher: Muller, Arrow
- Publication date: 1989
- Publication place: London
- Media type: Print (Hardback)
- Pages: 224
- ISBN: 978-0-09-173940-9
- OCLC: 19067718
- Dewey Decimal: 823/.914 Fic 19
- Preceded by: Kine
- Followed by: Dragonpond

In the year following the Mink Wars, Kine has resumed a solitary life by the Moon Pond. Since Kia's death, he has refused to pursue another mate. Vicious rats invade the forest, and Scrat's great-grandson (Scrat II) seeks Kine's help to defeat them.

=== Dragonpond ===
Dragonpond
- Cover of the second edition of Dragonpond
- Author: A. R. Lloyd
- Cover artist: Douglas Hall
- Language: English
- Series: The Kine Saga
- Release number: 3
- Genre: Fantasy novel
- Publisher: Muller, Arrow
- Publication date: 1990
- Publication place: London
- Media type: Print (Hardback)
- Pages: 201
- ISBN: 978-0-09-173980-5
- OCLC: 21295477
- Dewey Decimal: 823/.914 Fic 19
- Preceded by: Witchwood

Another year has passed since the fight against Rattun, and Kine is growing old. His reputation in the forest is dwindling, and even Flit and Farthing consider him to be old news.

== Characters ==
=== Weasels ===
- Kine – The titular character, Kine is a proud, aggressive young weasel. He has few friends until Kia wins his love.

In Kine, he experiences Blood Fury, a mental condition that causes him to go berserk: Kine states that "a weasel in the throes of the Blood Fury saw no danger, flew at anything."

In Dragonpond, Kine finds a new mate: Clary.

- Kia – A red-furred female weasel, and the love of Kine's life. With a fiery spirit but gentle nature, Kia is popular in the forests and hills. Kia, along with her kits, is killed by the mink in an attack on the den she shared with Kine. She appears in both Kine, and Witchwood, but due to her death in the former, she appears in the latter only as spirit.
- One-Eye – Kine's father. One-Eye is among the weasels who gather from the surrounding countryside to avenge Kia's death. While Kine is leading the younger weasels in a sneak attack on the mink stronghold, One-Eye finds a weasel—who identifies herself as Kine's sole surviving daughter—and names her "Wonder". One-Eye is killed by Gru in the final attack upon the pump-house, and therefore appears only in Kine.
- Wonder – A female weasel. Kine and Kia's only surviving daughter, Wonder bears a strong resemblance to her mother. When the mink attacked Kia and the other kits, the only survivor is Wonder—who escaped into the forest. She is found by the aging Poacher, who raised her by hand and later set her free. She soon meets One-Eye, who recognises her as Kine's daughter due to her similarity to Kia. Upon learning about her past, One-Eye gives her the name "Wonder" and reunites her with her father, Kine. Cheerful and naive at first, Wonder bravely helps the other weasels defeat Gru. She returns to Heath's territory as his mate.

In Witchwood, Wonder and Heath once again fight beside Kine against the Rat King, this time with the help of their five unnamed kits. By the time she is sent for in Dragonpond, Wonder has grown into a powerful fighter. Together with her father and his allies, Wonder helps rid the forest of Hob. Wonder appears in all three books.

- Heath – A young male weasel who joins Kine and the others in the Mink Wars. He later becomes Wonder's mate. Heath joins Kine in battling both Rattun and, later, Hob. He appears in all three books.
- Ford – A strong male weasel, who enters Kine's territory in hopes of winning Kia as a mate. He returns with One-Eye and the other local weasels to fight the mink alongside Kine. Brash, courageous, and good-humoured, he proves a valuable ally to Kine in the final assault on the mink at the pump-house. Ford appears only in Kine.
- Chuk-Chukra – A female weasel from the plains, a long distance from Kine's home. She is the first creature Kine encounters after escaping from the truck; she is immediately flirtatious towards him. While she tries to convince him to remain on the plains with her, Chukra sees Kine's devotion to his home and Kia's memory, and helps him find his way home.

Over the course of the journey, Chukra shows herself to be brave and intelligent, and Kine, likening her spirit to that of Kia's, finds himself enamoured with her. Chukra makes up her mind to live at the Moon Pond as Kine's mate, but dies from an electric shock on a railway less than halfway through the journey. Her spirit—along with Kia's—later appears to Kine, encouraging him to continue. Chukra appears only in Witchwood.

- Clary – A female weasel from an apple orchard nearby Kine's territory. Having heard stories of Kine's battles against Gru and Rattun, she comes to his territory seeking him as a mate. After winning him over through her flattery and charisma, Clary tells Kine she will only live in the Life Tree if he slays the Pond Dragon. When the eel is killed in the night by Hob, Clary, believing Kine to be the eel's killer, moves into the Life Tree and bears four kits. Eventually, Kine admits to misleading her about the death of the eel, stating, "I never slew any dragon ... there was an eel and Hob killed it."

When Kine learns of the alliance between Hob, Mag, and Athene, he sends Clary and the kits back to safety in the orchard. Reaching the orchard, Clary sends her friends Brat, Scoter, and Bald-ear to Kine's aid, and later comes alone to join them in the fight against Hob. In the end, she returns to the orchard for the winter, promising to reunite with Kine in the following summer. Clary appears only in Dragonpond.

=== Birds ===
- Watchman – A very old rook. Cynical and abrasive, Watchman serves as the sentinel for the local rook colony, alerting them of danger. Though he professes to dislike Kine and his ilk, he helps them repeatedly—even admitting to having a soft spot for Kia. Watchman appears in all three books.
- Flit-Cat, Peck, and Farthing-feather – A trio of house sparrows. They initially mock Kine, but after Peck is murdered by Rattun's followers, Flit and Farthing devote themselves to helping the weasel rid the Witchwood of the rats. The sparrows are extremely fond of fighting, and watching other creatures fight. They appear in Witchwood and Dragonpond.

=== Other animals ===
- Old Scrat – A male common shrew. A neurotic little creature prone to a pessimistic outlook. Though regarded as an annoyance by most of the animals, Kine finds a use for him as a spy against the mink. Old Scrat appears only in Kine, having died of old age before the beginning of the second book.
- Scrat II – Old Scrat's grandson. He has a deep admiration for Kine, having grown up hearing stories about the Mink War. In spite of his inherited cowardice, he plays a vital role in tricking Rattun into believing Kine has died. Scrat II appears only in Witchwood.
- Scrat III – Grandson of Scrat II. Like his predecessors, Scrat III serves as a worthy, if not timid, spy for Kine. He appears only in Dragonpond.

=== Antagonists ===
==== Kine ====
- Gru – A black-furred female American mink. Descended from mink that escaped from fur farms, Gru and her kind seek revenge against the humans: travelling the countryside, they massacre wildlife and livestock alike. Taking up residence under a nearby pump-house, Gru sets about taking over the marshland. In anticipation of meeting Kine's resistance, Gru heads an attack on the Life Tree, murdering Kia and four of her kits. In the final assault on the pump-house by Kine and the weasels, Gru is thrown into the dyke and crushed by the pump.
- Liverskin – A brown-furred male American mink. Gru's brown-furred mate. Though not as cunning as Gru, he is just as vicious. Liverskin is killed by Kine, Heath, and Wonder.

==== Witchwood ====
- Rattun the Rat King – An enormous male brown rat. Due to overexposure to Warfarin in small doses, Rattun and his colony have developed a tolerance to the poison, effectively creating a race of "Super Rats". Setting his sights on the Witchwood and surrounding territory, Rattun invades and defiles the Life Tree, infuriating Kine.
- The Sow Queen – Rattun's mate, a huge female brown rat intended to bear his offspring. She retreats with the other rats after her mate's defeat.

The author labels male rats "boars" and females "sows"; the correct terms are "bucks" and "does", respectively.

==== Dragonpond ====
- The Pond Dragon – A very large European eel dwelling in the Moon Pond. The Pond Dragon terrorises the pond-side community before being slain by Hob, for which Kine is mistakenly given credit.
- Hob the Berserker – A large male European polecat who takes Mag, a ferret, as his mate. He rallies Mag, and Athene, an owl, to help him ravage the countryside. Like Gru before him, Hob takes the pump house as his den. He is immensely strong and possesses a vicious temper; the loss of Mag drives him over the edge. In the climactic battle with Kine on the Life Tree, Hob falls into the partly frozen pond and drowns.
- Mag – A dusky-coloured female ferret. Once a hunting ferret belonging to Poacher, the cruel-natured Mag escaped after her owner's death; becoming feral. Out of spite towards the humans, she joins forces with Hob and Athene, and Hob takes her as his mate. After she kills Scoter, Mag is lured into a fallen tractor and killed by Kine, Brat, and Bald-ear.
- Athene – A female little owl. An aggressive, foul-mouthed creature, she joins Hob and Mag in terrorising the countryside. She is extremely jealous of Mag's standing with Hob, and abandons the ferret in the fight against Kine and the weasels from the orchard. Before the attack on Hob, Athene is mobbed by Watchman and the sparrows and flees for the hills.

=== Humans ===
- Poacher – A cantankerous old hunter who lives alone in a small house. The Girl works as an aid for him. Poacher is highly superstitious. He finds the young weasel kit, Wonder, after the mink attack Kine's den, and raises her in his home. He later sets Wonder free in the woods.

Poacher dies while hunting, and the Girl and her father—Ploughman—find his body in the forest. He appears only in Kine.

- Ploughman – The father of the Girl, and grandfather of the Child.
- The Engineer – Married to the Girl, he works for "River Board Engineers". The Engineer and the Girl have one child together, the Child.
- Girl – The daughter of Ploughman.
- Child – The son of the Girl and the Engineer. He is fascinated by the forest, especially any glimpse of the weasels. He appears as an infant in Witchwood and as a toddler in Dragonpond. (Note: In Dragonpond, the Child is also called "Toddler", or "Infant")

== Reception ==
Pauline Morgan reviewed The Kine Saga in 1996, comparing Lloyd's approach to animals to Henry Williamson's Tarka the Otter.
