= Elizabeth Taylor (engineer) =

Australian civil engineer and academic

Elizabeth Taylor AO
- Other names: Elizabeth Anne Taylor
- Occupation(s): Civil engineer, academic

Elizabeth Anne Taylor AO is an Australian civil engineer and academic.

== Education ==
Taylor studied engineering at University of New South Wales and graduated in 1978.

== Career ==
Taylor began her civil engineering career at the Maritime Service Board before moving to academic life. She lectured in engineering at Central Queensland University, rising to professor and later dean of the James Goldston Faculty of Engineering and Physical Systems. She also became Pro-Vice Chancellor and Executive Dean at the university.

== Awards and recognition ==
Taylor was appointed an Officer of the Order of Australia in the 2004 Australia Day Honours.
