= J. Malcolm Oades =

Director of Wate Agricultural Research institute at University of Adelaide in Australia

J. Malcolm Oades AM was Director of the Waite Agricultural Research Institute at the University of Adelaide in Australia. He is a widely cited author and in 2001 won the ISI Citation Laureate award. In 2000 Professor Oades received a D.Sc. from the University of Leeds, England.
