= Australian Listening Library =

Organisation that produced talking books

- Formation: January 1, 1977; 49 years ago
- Founder: Bessie Williamson
- Dissolved: 2008
- Legal status: Charity
- Location: Sydney, Australia

The Australian Listening Library (A.L.L.) produced talking books for people with a print disability. These cassette tape recordings were made available from public libraries throughout Australia.

== History ==
It was established in 1977 by Bessie Williamson. The A.L.L. was registered in NSW in March 1978, according to the ASIC register.

Williamson began the enterprise as she read a book onto a cassette tape for a bridge partner with eyesight problems. She then briefly worked for the Royal Blind Society (later Vision Australia), doing the same type of narration with textbooks.

A.L.L. has been listed as being previously known as the NSW branch of 'Hear a Book', and split from the Tasmanian organisation (North Hobart) circa 1980 to rebrand as the Australian Listening Library. However, 'Hear a Book' is listed on the ASIC register as being registered from January 1979 till April 2009, and other sources do not mention the conglomeration.

The A.L.L. was first at the Blues Point Towers building circa 1981. Williamson had rented two rooms as offices. From 1985 they were on the third floor at Number 26 Ridge Street, North Sydney, up till as recently as 1997. As at 2007, it was still operating but at different premises. The A.L.L. members appointed a liquidator in November 2007, and deregistered in March 2008, according to the ASIC register.

== Title selection process ==
Title selection was made from bestseller lists, and were generally popular fiction. Permission from copyright owners was obtained, and the A.L.L. would organise volunteer narration and conduct the recordings. Volunteers were sometimes linked with other organisations, such as Valerie Moon, who worked as a librarian at Wollongong City Library.

=== Tape production process ===
The A.L.L. selectively referred to guidelines on audio production set out by the National Library of Australia. These spanned narrator selection, voice, speech and interpretative requirements. Recordings would be produced by volunteer readers at home, with five separate quality control checks prior to cataloguing. These were to make sure that the quality of the copies matched the master tapes, and re-recording to address faults where necessary. Volunteer catalogue officer Wendy Mack would act as the final check for books appearing in the catalogue, confirming corrections from the home monitor. Other steps included checks by the National Library, publisher approval and then the final finished cassettes would be sent to the A.L.L. office in North Sydney.

Shorter books under 300 pages were preferred due to the number of cassette tapes required for recording. The A.L.L. found that libraries preferred to stock books with a maximum of six to ten tapes. However, for a requested title, volunteer readers would spend several months recording the material. This could extend to twenty-three tapes as was the case with R. F. Delderfield's Theirs was the kingdom, recorded by volunteer Nell Harper. Another lengthy recording was the twenty-three tapes for James A. Mitchener's The Source, recorded by volunteer Ron Stevens, equalled by his reading of Robert Hughes' The Fatal Shore.

== Catalogue ==
The newly renamed A.L.L. was listed as having eighty titles in 1980, and sold books for $2.50 per cassette tape. These titles were listed in the quarterly subscription publication, National Union Catalogue of Library Materials for the Handicapped (this catalogue was also known as NUC:H). The NUC:H was part of the National Union Catalogue maintained by the National Library of Australia. This subset catalogue aimed to assist in interlibrary loan activities between agencies providing library services to print handicapped people. Its focus on special format materials in Australia was envisaged to reduce the likelihood of duplication of original transcribing and recording into special mediums. The NUC:H had records contributed from several organisations including the A.L.L. and many other associations for the blind, braille and talking book libraries. This also included the organisation, "Hear A Book" Service (Tas) Inc., later linked with the A.L.L.. Titles were added to the NUC:H by National Library staff, who received descriptive worksheets from contributing organisations.

The Australian Listening Library's quarterly magazine, Listen Hear, listed that 1985 was a record year with 120 titles being added to their catalogue. In May 1987, volunteers Ted Geach and Joyce Foreman co-produced a reading of Margaret Throsby's book of interviews, 'The Throsby Tapes'. The interview subjects included Robert Helpmann, Joan Sutherland and John Cleese. This was considered a technical challenge at the time, with Geach and Foreman alternating voices for each subject.

=== Volunteer recognition ===
Anne Fraser received a 2KO/St George Building Society Community Service award in December 1987 for her work as an A.L.L. reader. Fellow reader, Enid Isaacs of Armidale, received an Order of Australia medal in 2004, in recognition of her contribution to the local community and her A.L.L. volunteering.
