= Battle of Hat Dich =

Part of the Vietnam War (1968–1969)

Coordinates: 10°39′0″N 107°9′0″E

- Part of the Vietnam War
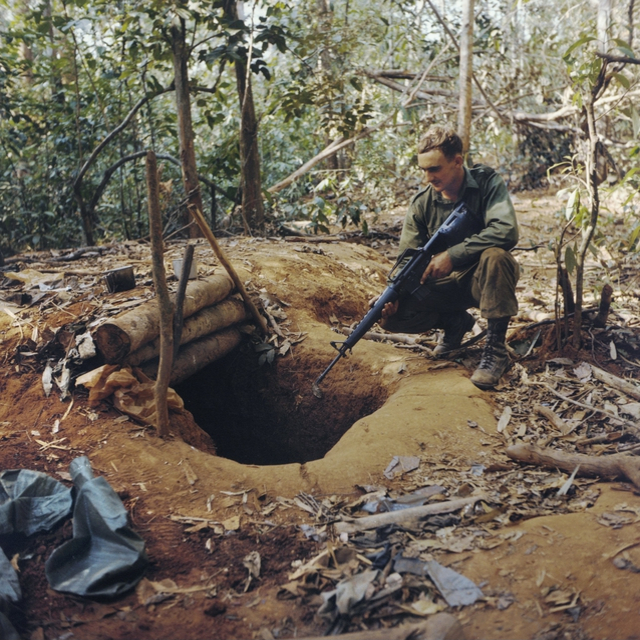
- An Australian soldier from 9 RAR looking into a Viet Cong bunker during Operation Goodwood, January 1969
Date	3 December 1968 – 19 February 1969
Location	Hat Dich Secret Zone, near Hắc Dịch, South Vietnam
Result	Allied victory

Belligerents
Australia; New Zealand; South Vietnam; United States; Thailand	Viet Cong; North Vietnam

Commanders and leaders
(Australia) Sandy Pearson (ANZAC Only)	Unknown

Units involved
(Australia) 1st Aust Task Force: (Australia) 1 RAR; (Australia) 4 RAR/NZ (ANZAC); (Australia) 9 RAR; (South Vietnam) 2nd Airborne Taskforce (South Vietnam) 1 Marine Brigade (South Vietnam) ARVN 52 Regt (United States) 4/12th Inf Battalion (United States) 3/11 ACR (Thailand) Royal Thai Army Expeditionary Division	(North Vietnam) HQ MR 7: 274 Regt; D440 Bn; D445 Bn; Thu Duc Regiment

Strength
~10,000 men	Unknown

Casualties and losses
(South Vietnam) 31 killed (Australia) 21 killed (New Zealand) 1 killed	Allied claim: 245 killed 39 possibly killed 17 captured

The Battle of Hat Dich (3 December 1968 − 19 February 1969) was a series of military actions fought between an allied contingent, including the 1st Australian Task Force (1 ATF) and the People's Army of Vietnam (PAVN) and Viet Cong (VC) during the Vietnam War. Under the code name Operation Goodwood, two battalions from 1 ATF deployed away from their base in Phước Tuy Province, operating against suspected PAVN/VC bases in the Hat Dich area, in western Phước Tuy, south-eastern Biên Hòa and south-western Long Khánh provinces as part of a large allied sweep known as Operation Toan Thang II. The Australians and New Zealanders conducted sustained patrolling throughout the Hat Dich and extensively ambushed tracks and river systems in the Rung Sat Special Zone, occupying a series of fire support bases as operations expanded. Meanwhile, American, South Vietnamese and Thai forces also operated in direct support of the Australians as part of the division-sized action.

On 6 February 1969, two additional battalions from the Thủ Đức VC Regiment were reported to have entered the Hat Dich area and 4 RAR/NZ (ANZAC) which consisted of three Australian and two New Zealand companies, was subsequently redeployed with tanks and armoured personnel carriers in support, resulting in the heaviest contacts of the operation. The fighting lasted 78 days and was one of the longest out of province operations mounted by the Australians and New Zealanders during the war. Although there were few major actions, the fighting resulted in heavy PAVN/VC casualties and forced them to abandon their permanent bases in the Hat Dich, as well as disrupting their preparations for an upcoming offensive during Tết. Immediately following the operation, the ANZACs were redeployed to block the approaches towards key US and South Vietnamese bases in Biên Hòa, Long Binh and Saigon in anticipation of the 1969 Tet offensive, during Operation Federal.

== Background ==
1968 was a turning point in the war in Vietnam. Losing more than 45,000 killed—against Army of the Republic of Vietnam (ARVN) and allied losses of 6,000 men—the Tet Offensive had been a tactical disaster for the PAVN and Viet Cong. Regardless, prior to Tet American commanders and politicians had talked confidently about winning the war, arguing that General William Westmoreland's strategy of attrition had reached the point where the PAVN/VC were losing soldiers and equipment faster than they could be replaced. Yet the scale of the fighting, and the surprise and violence with which the offensive was launched, had shocked the public, contradicting such predictions of imminent victory. Confidence in the military and political leadership declined, as did public support for the war in America. Ultimately, Tet was a publicity and media triumph for the PAVN/VC, and Hanoi emerged with a significant political victory.

The offensive had a similar effect on Australian public opinion, and caused growing uncertainty in the government about the determination of the United States to remain militarily involved in Southeast Asia. Amid the initial shock, Prime Minister John Gorton unexpectedly declared that Australia would not increase its military commitment in Vietnam beyond the current level of 8,000 personnel. The war continued without respite however, and between May and June 1968 1 ATF was again deployed away from Phước Tuy in response to intelligence reports of another impending offensive. The Australians subsequently took up positions north-east of Saigon during Operation Toan Thang I to interdict PAVN/VC lines of communication, fighting a series of significant actions over a 26-day period that became known as the Battle of Coral–Balmoral.

On 10 June 1968, General Creighton Abrams had replaced Westmoreland as commander of US and Free World Military Assistance Forces in Vietnam and the change in command had resulted in a change in both the concept of the war and its conduct. Abrams directed that the allied main effort would switch to protecting population centres, rather than searching for and attempting to destroy PAVN/VC main force units as they had done previously. Equally, the prosecution of the war would increasingly be handed over to the South Vietnamese under a policy of Vietnamization, with the Americans aiming to keep PAVN/VC units off balance to prevent them from interfering with resupply and reinforcement until the South Vietnamese could fight the war on their own. For the Australians the change in allied strategy foreshadowed a return to the pacification of Phước Tuy Province. Operations outside the province over the previous eighteen months had been costly, and of the 228 Australians killed and 1,200 wounded during the war to that point almost two-thirds had been killed since January 1967. (Note: Between January 1967 and 30 June 1968 at total of 147 Australian soldiers were killed in Vietnam, with 62 killed and 310 wounded in the first six months of 1968 alone.)

From July, 1 ATF completed a number of search-and-clear operations along the northern border areas and west of their tactical area of responsibility (TAOR) in Phước Tuy province. From the Nui Thi Vai and Nui Dinh hills in the west of the Phước Tuy, thick jungle stretched north to the junction of Biên Hòa and Long Khánh provinces, in an area known as the Hat Dich. Like the May Tao Mountains in the north-east and the Long Hải hills in the south, these areas of mountains and jungle had been used extensively by the VC as base areas for many years. The Hat Dich was used by the VC because of its proximity to Saigon, as well as the important South Vietnamese and US base areas in the Long Binh−Biên Hòa complex. The VC had been using the northern border regions—including the Thua Tich and Courtenay Rubber Plantation—to link their base areas in the Mây Tào Mountains in the north-east with the sparsely populated, but heavily vegetated Hat Dich area in the west. Over time, Australian operations in these areas usually resulted in contacts with varying size groups, including VC Main Force and occasionally PAVN units, and ultimately led to the destruction of their transit and training camps, as well as a series of bunker systems and logistic storage facilities.

== Prelude ==
By late-1968 a significant build-up of PAVN/VC forces was occurring in the III Corps Tactical Zone, with 70 Main and Local Force battalions augmented by four divisions moving back from sanctuaries in Cambodia. Meanwhile, the PAVN had established a new unit, Headquarters Military Region 7, to co-ordinate operations in the area to the east and north-east of Saigon. This development, coupled with extensive troop movements in the Hat Dich, indicated to the South Vietnamese and their allies the possibility of an imminent offensive, possibly targeting Biên Hòa, Long Binh, Bearcat Base or even Saigon. Commander US II Field Force Vietnam (IIFFV) subsequently committed 1 ATF—by then commanded by Brigadier Sandy Pearson—to operations in the Hat Dich as part of a large allied sweep across Phước Tuy, Biên Hòa and Long Khánh Provinces known as Operation Toan Thang II. The Australians would be tasked with locating and destroying PAVN/VC elements to disrupt such an offensive and prevent Route 15 from being interdicted. To achieve this Pearson devised Operation Goodwood, planning to employ all three of his Australian battalions, supported by tanks, cavalry and artillery. Several American infantry and artillery units were also placed under his command, as were a number of South Vietnamese infantry and marine battalions. In total the allied force approached the size of a division and included nearly 10,000 men.

In early December 1968 the first Australian units were inserted into their new area of operations (AO)—known as AO Townsville—east of Saigon, halfway between Biên Hòa and Nui Dat, 30 kilometres (19 mi) to the south-east. Initially the force consisted of one infantry battalion—1st Battalion, Royal Australian Regiment (1 RAR), commanded by Lieutenant Colonel Phillip Bennett—and support arms including Centurion tanks from C Squadron, 1st Armoured Regiment, M113 Armoured Personnel Carriers (APCs) from A Squadron, 3rd Cavalry Regiment, 105 mm M2A2 Howitzers from the batteries of 12th Field Regiment, Royal Australian Artillery and 155 mm M109 self-propelled artillery from A Battery, US 2/35 Artillery Regiment and C Battery, US 2/40 Artillery Regiment, as well as engineers from 1 Field Squadron. Later, following an extension of the AO a second battalion—at first the joint New Zealand and Australian 4 RAR/NZ (ANZAC) and later 9 RAR—would be deployed. (Note: A combined Australian and New Zealand infantry battalion, 4 RAR/NZ (ANZAC) consisted of B, C and D Companies 4 RAR and V and W Companies RNZIR.) It was planned to rotate the infantry battalions throughout the operation, with 1 ATF intending to maintain two battalions on Operation Goodwood at all times. The concept of operations divided AO Townsville into a number of battalion sized TAORs. Headquarters 1 ATF would be inserted into fire support base (FSB) Julia, situated north of the village of Thai Thein on Route QL 14 in Biên Hòa Province, while 1 RAR would be inserted from Nui Dat into FSB Dyke. The Australians then planned to conduct a reconnaissance-in-force, with extensive patrolling and ambushing by the infantry battalions supported by tanks and APCs, along with fire support from the field artillery batteries that would occupy a series of fire support bases as operations expanded. A number of SAS patrols were also scheduled to be inserted by air and APC to provide information on troop movements. The Royal Thai Army Expeditionary Division would also operate to the north-west in AO Banglane, while the 4th Battalion, 12th Infantry Regiment (detached from US 199th Light Infantry Brigade) and two troops from 3rd Battalion, 11th Armored Cavalry Regiment (3/11 ACR) as well as the ARVN 2nd Airborne Brigade would operate in direct support of 1 ATF until released.

PAVN and VC units identified in AO Townsville included 274th Regiment, PAVN 74 Artillery Regiment, D67 Engineer Battalion, Thủ Đức Regiment, D1, D2 and D6 Sapper Reconnaissance Battalions and D440 and D445 Provincial Mobile Battalions; all under the overall command of Headquarters Military Region 7. Of particular interest to the Australians was 3 Battalion, 274th Regiment, which was, according to intelligence sources, believed to have recently received large numbers of North Vietnamese replacements. The battalion was estimated to include between 250 and 300 men, and was well equipped. Located in the Hat Dich, the battalion was believed to be occupying a number of permanent base camps, complete with numerous trench systems, bunkers and tunnels.

== Battle ==
=== Initial operations in AO Townsville, 3–10 December 1968 ===
The operation commenced on 3 December with Headquarters 1 ATF moving forward by road into FSB Julia. 1 RAR then deployed into FSB Dyke 6 kilometres (3.7 mi) east in the western Hat Dich, moving in APCs from A Squadron, 3rd Cavalry Regiment, along with the tanks from C Squadron, 1 Armoured Regiment and the battalion's direct support battery, the 102nd Field Battery. The insertion was subsequently completed successfully, with the position secured by 11:00. Initially cautious, A Company moved in AO Wondai with 2 Troop of the tank squadron, while B and C Companies followed. Yet with no immediate threat against their position detected, the Australians commenced reconnaissance-in-force operations, with D Company also moving into its assigned area, entrusting the security and defence of FSB Dyke to Support Company. Although signs of VC activity were soon located—including a freshly killed deer—there were no contacts on the first day. Meanwhile, the Thais had also commenced operations in AO Banglane, and the American artillery from A Battery, US 2/35 Artillery Regiment and C Battery, US 2/40 Artillery Regiment had moved by road to occupy FSB Chestnut on the outskirts of Thai Thien in the southern sector of Biên Hòa Province from where they would operate in direct support of 1 ATF.

The following day, 4 December, at 08:30 C Company 1 RAR encountered three small groups of VC, and a platoon attack was launched under the cover of indirect fire, with little result. Meanwhile, a bombed out bunker system was encountered by B Company from 10:00, while other minor contacts developed as the Australians continued to advance, during which they uncovered a cache of rice. At 13:47 9 Platoon C Company was briefly engaged, and during a further reconnaissance of the area the Australians located a VC camp. They subsequently withdrew, calling in an air strike with napalm to destroy the bunkers. C Company returned to the area as dusk approached and was unable to search the area until the following day. At 07:40 on 5 December the Australians assaulted the camp with the tanks, destroying a number of bunkers at point-blank range with their main armament, while the infantry grenaded the pits. Yet once again the VC were found to have fled, leaving behind one dead body from the contact the previous afternoon. The camp was estimated to be adequate for a company-sized force and was found to be untouched by the air strike the previous day, which had fallen too far west. Leaving a small force of infantry and the tanks to destroy the camp, C Company continued and was again engaged at 11:05 by three VC at close range. Pushing on however, the Australians were subsequently fired on from at least five bunkers. Bennett ordered B Company into a blocking position to the north, while the tank troop was pushed up to support C Company which was preparing to conduct a company-attack. At 15:00 the camp was assaulted and it was again found to have been abandoned. Despite locating numerous bunkers, the Australians continued to pursue the VC, however their advance was hampered by the mechanical break-down of one of the Centurions; the vehicle was subsequently recovered to FSB Dyke.

Meanwhile, the US 4/12th Infantry had come into heavy contact in AO Kilcoy and had requested assistance rather than withdrawing. Yet with 1 ATF unable to provide any assets, Bennett detached two flamethrower teams from the 1 RAR Assault Pioneer Platoon which were subsequently used to help extract an American platoon that had been pinned down. Between 6–10 December 1 RAR continued to sweep AO Wondai, uncovering a number of ammunition caches and several freshly dug graves, however there was little contact between the Australians and the VC. To be sure, in response to the initial Australian patrols the VC had attempted to avoid contact, and had moved north away from 1 ATF. Yet aggressive patrolling by 1 RAR, supported by Centurion tanks and cavalry, had resulted in a number of contacts between the Australians and VC groups of up to platoon strength as they followed up the withdrawing forces. The subsequent discovery of extensive bunker systems guarded by caretaker groups, as well as the location of significant rice and weapons caches, confirmed the presence of a large PAVN/VC force in the Hat Dich, and the operation of an extensive resupply system in the area. During this time ARVN 2nd Airborne Brigade operated in AO Moose 20 kilometres (12 mi) to the north-east of FSB Julia, while the 3/11th ACR was operating to the east in AO Sherman and US 4/12th Infantry in AO Kilcoy to the west, all with minimal contact.

=== Expanding operations, 11–18 December 1968 ===
The Australians were in the midst of an extensive communist resupply and staging area however, and on 11 December Pearson extended AO Townsville to take advantage of this. Under the command of Lieutenant Colonel Lee Greville, 4 RAR/NZ was subsequently committed from Nui Dat to prevent the further northward movement of PAVN/VC forces. The new battalion's area of operations—AO Kilcoy—was in Long Khan Province, astride Route 15, north of Thai Thien, with its western boundary winding along the Song Thi Avi and the mangroves of the Rung Sat Special Zone. 4 RAR/NZ subsequently established a fire support base with its direct support battery, the 104th Field Battery, occupying FSB Sandpiper. Meanwhile, 1 RAR moved to FSB Diggers Rest by helicopter, after it was secured by B Company. Patrolling continued with minor contact, a significant bunker system with interconnecting tunnels was located by the Australians late in the day. In AO Sherman US 3/11 ACR concluded operations and commenced operations to the south-west in AOs Shenandoah and Shilo, while the 4/12th Infantry in AO Kilcoy extended its operations north-east into AO Monterey.

US forces were heavily committed in the Tây Ninh area near the Cambodian border and as a consequence 4 RAR/NZ had been designated as the reserve battalion for II FFV during the first phase of the operation, being liable to be deployed anywhere within III CTZ at short notice. Regardless, D Company deployed by APC and secured FSB Sandpiper, 1 kilometre (0.62 mi) east of Route 15, while the remainder of the battalion deployed by road. During this period 4 RAR/NZ was reduced to just its three Australian rifle companies, leaving one of the New Zealand companies at the Horseshoe feature undergoing its familiarisation period, and the other at Nui Dat as the Task Force reaction force. 4 RAR/NZ subsequently occupied a battalion defensive position at FSB Sandpiper, and once established the rifle companies began a patrolling and ambushing program. The requirement to be redeployed at short notice prevented the Australians from operating any more than one hour from Sandpiper however, and this constraint also limited their effectiveness in preventing interdiction along Route 15. Regardless, continual contact was maintained throughout the operation, while the area of operations was constantly adjusted and additional fire support bases constructed as the PAVN/VC attempted to bypass 1 ATF, fighting to maintain the ability to resupply forces in the Hat Dich and at the same time to consolidate forces to counter the Australians. Patrolling with companies mounted in APCs, 4 RAR/NZ operated west of Route 15 and conducted a number of successful ambushes. Meanwhile, 1 RAR continued operations in AO Wondai, the most active of the TAORs that made up AO Townsville.

On 12 December C Company 1 RAR—under the command of Major Brian Honner—engaged a small VC force in a bunker system in a minor skirmish which saw the Australians capture the position after using M72 rockets. Meanwhile, just after 12:00 a patrol from B Company engaged six PAVN after crossing a river. Two Australians were lightly wounded in the exchange of fire. That afternoon B Company was again in contact after uncovering another bunker system and withdrew to destroy the complex with indirect fire. However, even as the artillery engaged the bunker system, further contacts continued with little result. By 17:00 B Company advanced once again and the lead platoon was engaged—possibly by a VC patrol leaving the bunker system previously uncovered—and the two sides exchanged fire for about 10 minutes. During this contact 12 Platoon, D Company was establishing an ambush when they were engaged by automatic weapons and RPG-2 rocket propelled grenades, which killed one Australian whose body could not be recovered until the next day. At least one VC was hit during the fighting, although further casualties could not be ascertained. The next morning B Company returned to the bunkers and found them deserted.

Later, on 13 December, C Company continued its patrol program, when at 10:00 the lead section from 7 Platoon was fired on by VC in another bunker system. Honner ordered 9 Platoon to conduct a quick attack from the right which killed two VC and captured weapons and rice. Four Australians were wounded. Further bunkers nearby were also located, although they were found to be unoccupied and were marked with a balloon for destructing by an air strike at a later date. Contacts continued throughout the afternoon with little result, while the Australians continued to uncover numerous prepared positions and bunker systems. Meanwhile, an element of the 3/11th ACR struck a booby-trap in their area of operations, losing four killed and eight wounded. At 15:00 8 Platoon had been securing a landing zone for the remainder of C Company when they heard noises to the south; a patrol subsequently clashed with five VC in a bunker system before withdrawing as artillery was called onto the position. At 17:00 7 Platoon contacted 14 VC armed with AK-47 assault rifles on the edge of a clearing, killing one while the others withdrew to a bunker system and engaged the Australians with small arms and 60 mm mortars. An assault by the Australian platoon pushed the VC out of the bunkers and they secured the area after following the withdrawing force 200 metres (220 yd) to the south-west.

At 08:40 on the morning of 14 December 9 Platoon C Company 1 RAR engaged two Viet Cong in a bunker system and killed them both. The company continued patrolling, and that afternoon at 16:05 8 Platoon contacted two more VC, killing one and uncovering a disused camp. Intelligence reports had indicated a substantial VC concentration 3 kilometres (1.9 mi) west of Tam Phuoc and in response B Company 4 RAR/NZ and the 1 ATF Defence and Employment Platoon moved into the area by APC. At 17:00 5 Platoon, B Company and a section of Australian cavalry contacted a party of VC, killing one and wounding another who subsequently escaped. Further VC were observed moving west out of the battalion's AO, with elements of the US 3/17th Air Cavalry Regiment subsequently deployed. The following day C Company 1 RAR continued searching and ambushing in AO Wondai after detecting the presence of parties of VC who had likely been caught by surprise by the Australian patrols. Around 10:30 four VC approached 8 Platoon and were engaged with small arms; returning fire with RPGs which slightly wounded three Australians, three VC were then killed while a sweep by the Australians failed to locate the fourth. That afternoon D Company also uncovered an unoccupied bunker system, while A and B Company each had minor contacts, with 4 Platoon killing one VC around 16:00. Later, at 17:20 6 Platoon B Company was engaged by five VC at 30 metres (33 yd) while deploying into an ambush site, badly wounding the platoon commander; two VC were also hit. The VC then withdrew while the platoon sergeant took over command of the Australian platoon, and during the subsequent sweep one body was found. Meanwhile, in AO Kilcoy 9 Platoon C Company 4 RAR/NZ located three VC in a camp. A section then assaulted the camp opening fire at 15 metres (16 yd), killing one VC and wounding the other two who escaped; a PPSh-41 sub-machine gun, an SKS assault rifle and an M1 carbine were subsequently captured.

Although there had been no major actions during the first half of December, 40 contacts had occurred in the 1 ATF area of operations, resulting in 22 VC killed, two wounded and two more possibly killed, as well as the capture of 20 weapons, 66 mines, 153 grenades, 17 mortar rounds, 26 RPG-2 rockets, 50 kilograms (110 lb) of explosive and 26,380 small arms rounds. Most of the dead were VC Main Force soldiers, while some were PAVN, however no unit had been identified. Meanwhile, the Thais had also reported eight contacts in the Binh Son rubber plantation. On 16 December the platoons from 1 RAR continued patrolling and ambushing, and over the following two days the Australians and VC fought a number of fleeting contacts resulting in at least two VC being killed. In AO Kilcoy 4 RAR/NZ also continued patrolling, with a sentry from 5 Platoon B Company killing one VC which had followed the platoon after it had halted for their midday meal. Later on the evening of 17 December 1 ATF intelligence had reported the possible presence of a large VC force of 500 men in the Phước Hoà forest, while an unidentified artillery unit was believed to be preparing to attack Long Thanh and Binh Son with mortars after leaving the Thai AO.

However, that night there was little activity in the Australian AO, while at 03:15 on 18 December an ARVN outpost was attacked, resulting in two VC killed and three South Vietnamese wounded before a US reaction force arrived from Bearcat. The following day both 1 RAR and 4 RAR/NZ continued operations with minor contact; a camp of four small bunkers was located by 1 Platoon A Company 1 RAR, while at 09:20 3 Platoon discovered the bodies of two men that had likely also been killed during the contact with 2 Platoon on the 16th. Later that day 1 Platoon found another 11 bunkers located on the southern bank of the Suoi Cau Moi and they were destroyed the following day. Meanwhile, 12 Platoon D Company 4 RAR/NZ engaged two VC at 16:21, killing one and capturing an AK-47. Around 19:00 that evening a helicopter operating in direct support of 1 RAR observed red and white flashlights in the Australian AO and they were engaged by the 102nd Field Battery.

=== Fighting in late-December 1968 ===
The next morning, 19 December, an Australian patrol from the 1 RAR Anti-Tank Platoon searched the engagement area and reported finding nothing of significance. The Australian platoons continued to patrol however, and at 08:49 9 Platoon C Company engaged a group of six VC at 50 metres (55 yd) while crossing a creek, killing two and wounding a third. Just after midday 2 Platoon A Company had been moving in column parallel to a track when they were ambushed by a VC force in an undetected bunker system. Both the front and rear Australian sections were engaged with small arms, while the centre section was targeted by two M18 Claymore mines; heavy casualties resulted with the Australians losing one killed and 10 wounded. In response the remainder of A Company moved quickly to support the beleaguered platoon, while artillery fired on the bunkers. The evacuation of the casualties was complete by 15:20, following which the Australians assaulted the camp, only to find that the VC had withdrawn. With the light beginning to fail, 8 Platoon C Company heard noises in the scrub and observed a group of 10 VC in a nearby camp. At 17:45 the Australians moved in, killing one and forcing the remainder to withdraw.

Meanwhile, in AO Kilcoy 4 RAR/NZ continued to experience only minor contact. 10 Platoon D Company had been deployed in a blocking position at a track junction on 19 December and had engaged a group of five VC at 13:38 after they had approached the Australian position. The sentry opened fire with his M60 machine-gun at 40 metres (44 yd) killing one and probably wounding two more. The surviving VC went to ground and returned fire, wounding two Australians before successfully withdrawing. 2 SAS Squadron also continued reconnaissance patrols in AO Sternum, killing one VC during a clash at 10:30. The same day in AO Moose, B and D Companies from the ARVN 11th Airborne Battalion had also engaged a large VC force at 13:00, estimated to include at least two platoons armed with AK-47s and RPK light machine-guns. The fighting continued until last light and resulted in heavy ARVN casualties which included six killed and six wounded. VC casualties were unknown.

On the morning of 20 December A Company 1 RAR found a VC surgical facility and dispensary, and capturing a quantity of rice, salt and documents. At 09:20 9 Platoon C Company ambushed seven VC moving south on a track, killing three of them and capturing an AK-47. Only one of the VC had been armed, while the other two had been carrying packs filled with food and tobacco. Ten minutes later 8 Platoon ambushed two VC moving along a track away from 9 Platoon, killing one and also capturing an AK-47. Moving on, the Australian platoon was in contact again at 10:50, with the lead sections killing a VC soldier in a bunker and uncovering a cache. Later A Company uncovered another large, unoccupied bunker complex and quantities of food, medical supplies, explosives and ammunition. As with the previous bunker systems the Australians proceeded to destroy them with explosives, with A Company 1 RAR destroying 93 bunkers over the previous three days. On dusk 1 Platoon was establishing its night ambush location when it had a fleeting contact at 17:55. The same day in the 4 RAR/NZ AO, a composite platoon protecting a survey party engaged a group of five VC without result, while W Company on the Horseshoe feature had a successful ambush, killing two VC and wounding a third.

At 03:00 on 21 December, FSB Redhat 3 in AO Moose—occupied by elements of ARVN 2nd Airborne Brigade—came under sustained mortar fire and ground attack by up to two VC companies. The mortaring ceased at 04:00 and the attack was finally repelled by 05:40, with the ARVN following up as the VC attempted to withdraw to south and south-east. 5 Airborne Battalion maintained contact with the withdrawing forces, while 11 Airborne Battalion moved north-east into a blocking position. Supported by artillery and helicopter gunships the ARVN inflicted heavy casualties on their attackers before the fighting finally ceased at 06:15. ARVN losses included two killed and 12 wounded, and one American advisor wounded. VC casualties were 29 killed and two wounded, while a large quantity of weapons were also recovered by the South Vietnamese. The attacking force was later identified as two companies from the VC 274th Regiment. Meanwhile, in the AO Wondai it was planned that B, C and D Companies 1 RAR would continue to ambush on 21 December, while A Company would cross the Suoi Cau Moi to establish blocking positions around the Binh Son rubber plantation. At 10:30 A Company discovered a cache of medical supplies before cautiously crossing the creek. On the northern bank they uncovered 15 recently used bunkers and the graves of five VC, four of which were believed to have also been killed in a contact with 8 Platoon C Company on 13 December. While moving into a new ambush position, 6 Platoon B Company also discovered an extensive bunker system and the company remained in place to destroy it the following day. A Company also reported destroying a further 30 bunkers.

The following day, 22 December 1 RAR continued ambushing and patrolling, with A and B Companies continuing to destroy the bunkers located the previous day, while C and D Companies maintained their ambush positions. A small bunker system was located during the day but there was no further contact. At 18:00 the Australians received reports of heavy fighting outside of their area of operations, with a company from the ARVN 1/43 Regiment coming under heavy mortar fire, before being assaulted by a reinforced VC battalion from 274th Regiment. The ARVN were supported by AC-47 Spooky gunships, helicopter light fire teams, fast air and US and Thai artillery and were reinforced by elements of the ARVN 1/48th Regiment. Meanwhile, at 22:00 a VC company was observed moving from the south to reinforce the battle which continued until 00:30 when the VC finally broke contact. Other South Vietnamese units had also been attacked during the evening, with the fighting resulting in a total 50 VC killed, while South Vietnamese losses included 13 killed and 50 wounded. Also that evening, elements of 2 Troop, A Squadron, 3rd Cavalry Regiment had been occupying an ambush site on a track 2.5 kilometres (1.6 mi) west of Route 15, northeast of Phu My in Phước Tuy Province. At 23:58 the ambush was sprung, killing six VC and capturing another, while 13 oxcarts were also destroyed.

The next day at 12:00 on 23 December in AO Kilcoy, 8 Platoon, C Company 4 RAR/NZ mounted in APCs had been reacted to a reported sighting of VC. The platoon was split into two, with one half under the platoon sergeant moving forward on foot to search the area, moving through open rice paddy parallel with the dense scrub. When the patrol came level with a break in the vegetation it was suddenly engaged with a claymore-type command detonated mine, wounding five members of the platoon. In response the remaining half of the platoon swept the area forward of the engagement area, however the VC made good their escape, withdrawing by sampan down a branch of a nearby river. One of the wounded Australians subsequently died of his wounds before the evacuation of the casualties could be arranged. The Christmas cease-fire began at 18:00, but was broken after the VC attacked elements of ARVN 2nd Airborne Brigade at FSB Barbara with mortars and small arms fire. Australian and South Vietnamese artillery and helicopter light fire teams were subsequently called-in to provide support.

On Christmas Day a special dinner was prepared by the 4 RAR/NZ cooks and trucked to the battalion at FSB Sandpiper in AO Kilcoy. Likewise with 1 RAR still deployed in AO Wondai, a Christmas lunch was prepared and flown to the rifle companies, while the Australians at FSB Julia also enjoyed a traditional Christmas Day lunch, with the other ranks served by the officers and sergeants. Although the allied units continued to observe the cease-fire there were a number of minor violations initiated by PAVN/VC units. Soon after lunch an RPG round destroyed an American jeep on Route 15, and a number of Australian tanks and APCs, along with the Task Force Headquarters Defence and Employment Platoon reacted. The Australians engaged the area with machine-gun fire and the infantry swept the area, uncovering numerous tracks but little else. Later, in AO Wondai 10 Platoon 1RAR was fired on by two VC at 14:07, and they subsequently captured an AK-47. Meanwhile, over the evening of 25/26 December South Vietnamese forces at FSB Barbara in AO Moose came under small arms and mortar fire, suffering a number of wounded. In AO Wondai on 26 December A, B, and C Companies 1 RAR were to redeploy to new ambush locations, while D Company moved north to ambush Route 320 following a further extension of the area of operations. At 09:55, while moving to a new position 8 Platoon, C Company engaged seven VC carrying packs filled with food, clothes and detonators, killing two and capturing an AK-47.

On 27 December, after being released as III CTZ reserve, 4 RAR/NZ was deployed further north to the border between Long Khánh and Biên Hòa Province. Flying-in to AO Warragul to more effectively prevent the interdiction of Route 15, the battalion established FSB Wattle, a position which had been used by the Australians previously during Operation Hawkesbury in September. This move proved unsuccessful however, with the PAVN/VC nowhere to be found. That morning in AO Wondai, 1 Platoon A Company 1 RAR was watching the northern bank of Suoi Cau Moi and at 07:45 they contacted three VC as they attempted to cross the creek, killing one. Thirty minutes later 7 Platoon, C Company had been engaged by two VC while moving into a new ambush location. In response the Australians swept the area, and were subsequently contacted by 10 to 15 VC in a bunker system with small arms, RPG-2s and a claymore mine, resulting in one killed and five wounded, including the platoon commander, Lieutenant Bob Convery. More than 1,000 metres (1,100 yd) away, Honner moved quickly to bring the remainder of C Company to the aid of the platoon in contact. Meanwhile, 7 Platoon had pulled back from the bunkers moving their casualties to a position where they could be winched up through the canopy for Dustoff. The casualty evacuation was complete by 11:00, while Convery had continued to co-ordinate fire support for his platoon despite his wounds. By the time C Company arrived the battle was over, however following preparation by artillery the Australians assaulted the camp, only to find that the VC had withdrawn; it was destroyed the next day. That afternoon Australian cavalry from 1 Troop occupied an ambush site 2 kilometres (1.2 mi) south-west of FSB Julia, near one of the tributaries of the Rung Sat. At 17:20 the ambush was sprung, killing one VC and capturing a quantity of rice after sinking a sampan.

Between 28–30 December only minor contact occurred in AO Warragul, with C Company 4 RAR/NZ fing six separate bunker systems—many of which were fully developed with overhead protection and communication trenches—confirming the intelligence view that the area was likely the base and training are for a number VC main force units. Elsewhere, after handing over the defences on the Horseshoe to V Company, W Company flew north on 31 December to join the battalion. Meanwhile, 1 RAR continued operations in AO Wondai with minor contact.

=== Action continues, 1–20 January 1969 ===
On 1 January 1969 Pearson moved 9 RAR from Nui Dat to relieve 1 RAR in the Long Thanh district of Biên Hòa Province. Under the command of Lieutenant Colonel Alan Morrison, the battalion subsequently took over operations in AO Wondai. Supported by the 161st Battery, Royal New Zealand Artillery they occupied FSB Diggers Rest. The battalion then mounted a series of company sweeps through the area while watching for large-scale movement of PAVN/VC forces. For the Australians, Operation Goodwood then became a 'cat and mouse' game, with 1 ATF manoeuvring in the hope of engaging the VC to destroy their bases and restricting their movement. The PAVN/VC struggled to maintain their resupply system, and in response to this pressure they opted to disperse in an attempt to bypass the Australians, only consolidating to fight when an opportunity to arose to inflict a setback on the allies. Meanwhile, a number of SAS patrols were inserted by air and road on 6 January 1969 to gather information on PAVN/VC troop movements. Further patrols were deployed to the southern Biên Hòa-Firestone Trail area in mid-January, while additional SAS patrols were inserted on 29 January in an attempt to ascertain PAVN/VC troop movements.

On 2 January 1 RAR was immediately redeployed on Operation Tiger Balm to conduct a cordon-and-search of Xom My Xuan and Phước Hoà, along Highway 15. This operation was designed to support Goodwood, as it was believed that the PAVN/VC infrastructure had moved into the villages along the highway after being forced out of the jungle during 1 ATFs operations there. The search was completed by 12:00 on 4 January and the operation concluded have only achieved modest results for the Australians. During this period South Vietnamese forces had continued to operate in AO Moose with minimal contact. Yet at 16:40 on 7 January B Company, 5 Airborne Battalion was engaged by a VC squad resulting in five South Vietnamese being wounded, two of whom later died of their wounds. The VC had then withdrawn and their casualties could not be determined. Meanwhile, 4 RAR/NZ began a sweep in their allocated area just inside the Phước Tuy border in AO Warrigul, settling into a routine of movement by day and harbouring at night while covered by the guns of the 104th Battery at FSB Wattle. Ambushing on tracks continued to prove successful. On 1 January 4 Platoon B Company ambushed a track, killing one VC, while later 7 Platoon C Company found a cache of twenty 82 mm mortar rounds, twenty 57 mm recoilless rifle rounds and 40 grenades. On 3 January 9 Platoon C Company was forced to spring an ambush during set up, killing two VC soldiers and capturing their packs. Because of the frequency that the VC were continuing to use the tracks in the AO the ambush remained in location. Less than an hour later, while in a company defensive position, the 6 Platoon B Company sentry contacted three VC soldiers moving outside the perimeter, killing one before withdrawing back the defensive position under the covering fire of the section machine-gun. The two surviving VC then fled back along the track away from 6 Platoon, only to be killed by 5 Platoon who was also ambushing the track.

Throughout January patrols from 9 RAR had fought small groups of VC daily, and on occasions encountered groups of platoon and sometimes company-sized. Numerous bunker complexes and camps were also uncovered. Although most contacts were minor, at times these encounters led to prolonged fighting. At 12:20 on 5 January 4 Platoon, B Company engaged five VC and in the ensuing action two were killed while one Australian died of wounds. At the same time D Company contacted a VC base camp, losing five men wounded. The following day 5 Platoon, B Company was engaged at 12:00 and suffered one killed and five wounded, while the Assault Pioneer Platoon later uncovered a sizeable cache of ammunition. On 10 January, A Company struck a large bunker system and was engaged with heavy machine-guns which pinned down an Australian platoon. During the company action that ensued the remaining two Australian platoons conducted a flanking assault with bayonets fixed under the cover of mortars and artillery. Two Australians were killed and the battle continued for three-and-a-half hours until last light. Another assault the following morning by A Company supported by tanks found the camp abandoned by the VC. Meanwhile, in AO Warrigul 4 RAR/NZ continued to find a number of small camps and bunker systems. During the morning D Company had had a number of fleeting contacts while setting up ambush locations and had also located a battalion-sized bunker system. However at 16:30 11 Platoon D Company engaged up to 10 VC in a bunker system, and in the ensuing clash the Australians killed two before withdrawing under the cover of artillery due to the weight of defensive fire. An air strike was subsequently used to destroy the camp, probably killing three more VC. A sweep of the area by the Australians at first light the next day found no weapons or any other material. Late on the evening of 11 January a New Zealand soldier from 3 Platoon, W Company was accidentally killed by friendly fire after firing broke out in response to noises heard on the company perimeter; an incident which clearly illustrated the difficulties and dangers of operating in the jungle at night. Two days 4 RAR/NZ was relieved by 1 RAR, and returned to Nui Dat.

In AO Wondai on 13 January 8 Platoon C Company 9 RAR engaged two VC at 09:15, killing one and capturing an AK-47 and a pack. Soon after B Company discovered an unoccupied camp and captured a quantity of equipment including a 60 mm mortar and base plate, rifles and ammunition. Several hours later A Company located a disused camp and a bunker system, uncovering grenades and explosives. Eight bodies were also discovered, and they were believed to have been killed during the contact three days before. Meanwhile, even with 1 RAR nearing the end of its tour of duty it was committed to Operation Goodwood once more, and was tasked with ambushing lines of communication and conducting reconnaissance-in-force operations if required. On 13 January Bennett moved to establish FSB Margaret 1 kilometre (0.62 mi) east of Tam Phuoc in Biên Hòa Province, located in AO Kilcoy immediately west of AO Wondai. That morning at 07:30 C Company commenced the fly-in, securing the fire support base while Support Company and the 102nd Field Battery departed Nui Dat by road. B Company subsequently flew-in to FSB Chestnut to secure the area for the road convoy until it was called forward to FSB Margaret, and was followed by A and D Companies which were air-lifted by helicopter. The Australians then commenced an operation to search part of the Rung Sat, locating a number of small camps among the mangroves and swamps. At last light 6 Platoon B Company 1 RAR engaged three VC, and the next morning one body and an AK-47 were discovered. In AO Moose, the ARVN 2nd Brigade had concluded operations on 15 January and was relieved in place by a Brigade of the South Vietnamese Marine Division, with the 1st Marine Battalion occupying FSB Kathleen and 5th Marine Battalion occupying FSB Barbara.

Later, in AO Wondai on the afternoon of 16 January 40 VC were sighted in a camp and were engaged with artillery. C Company 9 RAR, under the command of Major Laurie Lewis, was rapidly redeployed by helicopter just prior to last light. The company moved on foot to its objective, and set up a night ambush. At 23:20 the ambush was initiated by 8 Platoon, when approximately 15 PAVN soldiers carrying torches entered the engagement area; five were killed in the action. At first light C Company entered and searched the now abandoned camp, 300 metres (330 yd) from the ambush site, and aside from a number of dead killed previously by artillery nothing of note was discovered. In contrast, 1 RAR had continued to operate with only minor contact in AO Kilcoy, ambushing a number of waterways. However, on the evening of 16 January at 20:50 9 Platoon C Company fired on a sampan, engaging the vessel at 50 metres (55 yd) with an M60 machine-gun, small arms and grenades, killing two VC. The Australians then used flares to illuminate any swimmers but nothing further was observed. Later at 11:43 on 18 January in AO Kilcoy a section of Australian APCs from A Squadron Headquarters was deployed to resupply D Company 1 RAR when an APC hit a large road-mine 8 kilometres (5.0 mi) west of Thai Thien on Route 15, killing the crew commander and wounding two others, and destroying the vehicle. Later as Goodwood continued the VC mined roads and tracks extensively, hampering the operations of the Australian cavalry and causing further damage to vehicles and injuries to personnel. At dusk an ambush from 6 Platoon B Company had engaged two VC, and although one soldier was seen to fall no casualties were found during the sweep. At 06:15 the following morning an ambush by 4 Platoon B Company contacted a group of five VC, killing one and wounding a second. Around 07:00 B Company 1 RAR observed a large force of 70 VC moving from north-west to south-east, wearing greens and carrying large packs. They were subsequently engaged by artillery, while A Company moved into blocking positions by APC to the south-west and B Company commenced a sweep to the east. Much of the artillery fire had been inaccurate however, and the sweeps were completed without incident. At 12:00 D Company was inserted by air to the west, and also swept the area without incident.

In a series of incidents on the morning of 19 January, all four of 9 RAR's rifle companies, as well as the battalion's Support Company, were in contact at the same time during heavy fighting. So frenetic was the action that the 161st Battery RNZA were only just able to change their supporting fires from one target to another, while the 9 RAR Mortar Platoon was also used to hit multiple dispersed targets with their indirect fires. Three Australians were subsequently killed and five wounded, all from 2 Platoon A Company, after RPGs were fired into the company position. The same day an Australian soldier was accidentally killed during a patrol by the 9 RAR Anti-Tank Platoon. On 20 January, another Australian was killed during an action against a VC bunker. These actions were having some effect however, and reports suggested that a VC regiment was attempting to move north through AO Wondai, but were being delayed by successful patrolling by 9 RAR. Consequently, 9 RAR continued its blocking operation. Intelligence received in mid-January highlighted the success of these operations, with the VC 274th Regiment believed to be encountering serious morale problems, due in part, to a lack of food.

Meanwhile, after watching a well used track for a number of days 2 Troop, A Squadron, 3rd Cavalry Regiment together with an SAS patrol, established an ambush 5 kilometres (3.1 mi) east of FSB Chestnut in Biên Hòa Province on 19 January. At 17:16 the ambush was sprung against a large force, resulting in three killed and two wounded. The survivors were able to successfully withdraw however, and they waited until after dark to counter-attack the Australians. The SAS were subsequently forced to withdraw as the APCs provided covering fire while another three VC were probably killed in the fighting. The same evening 3 Troop mounted a successful ambush close to FSB Chestnut, killing one VC and wounding another three. These ambushes were two of a number conducted by the Australian cavalry throughout the operation, and they used a new, more aggressive technique with considerable success. Indeed, during this period 10 successful ambushes were mounted in the Hat Dich area using the new tactics devised by the squadron's Intelligence Officer after working with the US Army during previous operations. Three weeks later three graves were discovered 1 kilometre (0.62 mi) west of FSB Chestnut and it was believed that they had also been killed during the 2 Troop ambush mounted on 19 January. Later, on 20 January 1 Troop was deployed on a reconnaissance-in-force operation approximately 5 kilometres (3.1 mi) south of FSB Julia in Biên Hòa Province. At 09:44 one of the APCs detonated an anti-tank mine, wounding five Australians. The same day the South Vietnamese A Marine Brigade and 1st Marine Battalion departed AO Moose. Headquarters ARVN 52nd Regiment relieved them, augmented by the ARVN 3/52nd Regiment and the 5th Marine Battalion which remained attached in direct support. Operations continued with little contact however.

=== Operations in late-January 1969 ===
1 RAR redeployed on 21 January, with A Company moving west back to Route 15 to ambush the area and C Company moving back into AO Wondai by APC to sweep a key ridgeline. B and D Companies continued to search and ambush in AO Kilcoy, while Thai units completed a reconnaissance-in-force south from the Binh Son area. That afternoon A Company relieved D Company, which continued on towards FSB Julia to establish ambush positions in the vicinity of Thai Thien. C Company had completed its sweep without incident. That evening 12 VC moving from east to west entered the killing ground of an ambush mounted by 10 Platoon D Company. The ambush was sprung at 21:10 with claymore mines and small arms at a range of less the 2 metres (6.6 ft), hitting two of them. A sweep at first light the following morning found one dead, an AK-47 and marks where another wounded soldier had been dragged towards the village. At 09:15 the following day D Company searched an area where air strikes had revealed what were believed to be tunnels and a camp, and they uncovered a number of bunker systems. 12 Platoon subsequently engaged two VC, wounding one and capturing him; he was administered morphine before he died of his wounds. A subsequent search of the area uncovered another bunker system. Meanwhile, that afternoon C Company had completed its search without incident and returned to AO Kilcoy. That evening 11 Platoon D Company was contacted at 19:15 while moving into a night ambush, killing one VC soldier.

A Company 1 RAR completed its redeployment by APC at 10:10 on 23 January, while C Company moved to FSB Margaret. That evening at 20:50 10 Platoon D Company ambushed a group of VC, killing two. On 24 January C Company 1 RAR conducted a reconnaissance-in-force against a suspected logistic transfer point, while a combat engineer team was detached to the battalion, along with a troop of APCs and a troop of tanks. That morning at 09:25 a number of bunkers were located by 8 Platoon, while forty-four 50-kilogram (110 lb) bags of rice and two bags of salt were found by the Assault Pioneer Platoon. A Company had found three fresh graves during the day, which were believed to have been killed during recent SAS operations in the area, while a number of small camps and a quantity of weapons, clothing and rice were also uncovered. Meanwhile, B Company was redeployed to block VC movement through Phu My. That afternoon a patrol from 7 Platoon B Company had clashed with ten to fifteen VC at 17:41, killing one at close range. At the same time 3 Platoon A Company was also in contact, wounding one Viet Cong soldier. Later at 18:57 11 Platoon D Company fired on two VC who returned fire, wounding one Australian. B Company operations east of Phu My continued on 25 January, with an ambush by 6 Platoon firing on a number of oxcarts at 05:45; later it was discovered that a local villager had been wounded after ignoring the curfew. 1 RAR continued operations over the coming days with only minor contact which resulted in several VC being wounded and a number of rice caches located by the Australians before they moved to secure pick-up zones on the afternoon of 26 January to prepare for extraction the following day.

On 27 January 4 RAR/NZ was deployed to the Hat Dich to replace 1 RAR which had returned to Nui Dat that day, following a few weeks respite during which the New Zealand W Company had carried out a three-day operation with an ARVN unit in the Long Green. B Company moved by APC to the old FSB Dyke position and secured it for the fly-in of battalion headquarters and D Company. W Company rejoined the battalion the following day, deploying by APC east of Phước Tuy border in response to information from SAS patrols of significant VC movement in this area. Operating in AO Riversdale to the west of FSB Julia in an area close to that which they had in mid-December—now extended further east—the rifle companies then swept an area of jungle 10 kilometres (6.2 mi) north-east of Thai Thien on Route 15. On 29 January W Company clashed heavy with a company-sized force. During stand-to that evening the New Zealanders had heard the sounds of movement through the bamboo and a short but fierce engagement ensued with W Company being hit by heavy machine-gun fire and RPGs from three directions, wounding three men. W Company successfully resisted the assault however, firing their M60 machine-guns and more than 15 claymore mines, while artillery fire was called-in to break up the attack. Blood trails and drag marks found the following morning indicated that as many as five VC had been killed. SAS patrols had been operating in the area prior to the arrival of W Company and it is probable that previous contacts during the day had led the VC to believe that they had located a five-man reconnaissance patrol rather than a New Zealand rifle company. The same day 9 RAR's AO was extended westward, with FSB Jenny established to cover the operations of B, C and D Companies south of Route 15 following indications of an imminent attack against Long Thanh. Meanwhile, A Company returned to Nui Dat to refit. The expected attack never eventuated however, and these operations proved uneventful, with the battalion redeploying to its original AO two days later.

4 RAR/NZ had begun to meet strong resistance within its AO. On 30 January all four rifle companies clashed with small two to five-man groups of VC within the space of a few hours, killing five and uncovering another camp as well as quantities of ammunition, medical supplies and rice. Meanwhile, after an uneventful period at the Horseshoe, the New Zealand V Company joined 4RAR/NZ following its relief-in-place by C Company. After landing V Company commenced moving towards it patrol area and soon found itself in an entrenched camp, locating a number of caches. An ambush was then established on tracks approaching the bunker system by 3 Platoon, who killed three VC over the following two days. The next day, 31 January D Company contacted one VC soldier at 09:15 without result and the Australians subsequently attempted to follow-up. An hour later 10 Platoon was ambushed with claymore mines, RPGs and small arms by five to 10 VC soldiers located in a bunker system, killing two Australians and wounding two more. The Australians resisted strongly however, and the platoon's fire eventually forced the VC to break contact and withdraw west. During the opening burst of fire Private Malcolm Gibson, an acting section commander, had been knocked unconscious and after recovering he crawled forward under heavy fire to man the machine-gun, providing covering fire to his section despite having the pack shot off his back. He then regrouped his men and provided effective fire support for the remainder the platoon. For his leadership and courage he was later awarded the Distinguished Conduct Medal.

=== Renewed fighting, 1–16 February 1969 ===
On 1 February in AO Moose the South Vietnamese 5th Marine Battalion suffered two killed and six wounded following the detonation of an anti-personnel mine. Later that evening Australian cavalry from 3 Troop ambushed the edge of the waterway to the southwest of FSB Julia. The ambush was sprung at 02:08, and resulted in two VC killed and one sampan sunk. During the mid-afternoon in AO Riverdale, 3 Platoon V Company engaged a number of VC, killing one and capturing an M16 assault rifle, while after last light 5 Platoon B Company sprung a night ambush, killing one and wounding another and capturing an AK-47, an SKS and a number of M16 magazines. That afternoon 11 Platoon D Company had also found a camp and eight graves; however there was no further contact between the Australians and VC in AO Riverdale for the next five days, although on 4 February W Company found a VC camp containing 60 bunkers which was subsequently searched and then destroyed by the New Zealanders. Meanwhile, in AO Wondai B Company 9 RAR subsequently conducted a number of successful ambushes and on 4 February 5 Platoon ambushed a VC party of eight men at first light, killing six of them.

In AO Riverdale on 6 January, B Company 4 RAR/NZ had patrolled into the D Company AO, and soon after 4 Platoon engaged two VC, killing both and capturing two AK-47s and two packs. Soon after 5 Platoon uncovered five fresh graves which were likely the result of a previous action. Two additional battalions from the Thủ Đức Regiment were reported to have entered the Hat Dich area. Pearson subsequently redeployed 4 RAR/NZ the following day, and with tanks and APCs in support the battalion moved by helicopter into AO Tiki to the north-west along Route 15, where it would become engaged in the heaviest contacts of Operation Goodwood. Greville subsequently establish FSB Janice in the rice fields at the northern end of the Rung Sat. A number of successful ambushes were conducted by the Australian and New Zealand infantry over the coming days, while patrolling by day resulted in the discovery of a number of large weapons caches. Indeed, although tactically questionable, the VC had continued to use many of the same routes and tracks throughout the operation despite suffering heavy casualties during these ambushes. Overnight Australian cavalry from 3 Troop had been deployed in a night ambush 3 kilometres (1.9 mi) west of Phu My, adjacent to Route 15 on the edge of the Rung Sat. A motorised junk and a sampan were subsequently sunk and three VC killed by the Australians.

On 8 February, D Company 9 RAR was engaged in the north-east of their AO with RPGs and small arms by a platoon-size force in a bunker system. Heavy fighting ensured with the action lasting five hours as the Australians called in mortar and artillery fire, and were also supported by air strikes and helicopter light fire teams. The lead Australian platoon—12 Platoon—had suffered one wounded during the initial contact, and a further five were wounded as the sweep continued. Due to the heavy fire the evacuation of the wounded was delayed, and the Dustoff helicopter was forced to depart without the casualties, one of whom subsequently died of his wounds. A number of VC snipers in trees had also engaged the Australians, in conjunction with the troops in the bunkers and the area was subsequently bombarded by the Australians with artillery, helicopter light fire teams and air strikes before 12 Platoon was able to break contact. Five VC were believed to have been killed. Later during the subsequent follow-up over the next two days, the Australians found an extensive complex of four bunker systems with a total of over 60 mutually supporting bunkers. At last light in AO Tiki, 3 Platoon V Company 4 RAR/NZ observed around 35 VC moving west out of the area of operations and they were engaged by artillery and helicopter light fire teams. The VC responded with small arms, firing on the helicopters before withdrawing under the cover of darkness after suffering a number of casualties. The following day the New Zealanders conducted a sweep of the area and recovered one body. Meanwhile, the ARVN 52nd Regiment concluded operations in AO Moose and commenced operations in AO Warragul.

The following day, 9 February, contacts continued between the New Zealanders and the VC. At 14:38 a section patrol from 2 Platoon W Company 4 RAR/NZ clashing with five VC at 10 metres (33 ft) while conducting a reconnaissance of a track, killing two and capturing an AK-47 and a pistol. A follow-up sweep by 2 Platoon located a small camp and five packs. Further fleeting contacts occurred during the afternoon and early evening, before V Company sighted 10 VC at 19:50 from their night position and subsequently engaged them with artillery. At first light the next morning the New Zealanders were contacted while checking the area of the previous night's engagement and one VC was killed. That evening V Company again observed 14 VC moving through their area of operations and they again directed artillery onto them. The VC subsequently withdrew carrying two bodies, while a sweep early the next morning resulted in the New Zealanders capturing a pack containing four pistols and three AK-47 magazines. Later four dead VC were found and were believed to have been the result of the previous contact with V Company on the 10th, while B Company nearby also found a dead body in the area engaged by the New Zealanders.

Later, during a search in AO Wondai on the afternoon of 14 February, C Company 9 RAR contacted a strong VC force in a large bunker system. Despite being supported by a helicopter light fire team and artillery the Australians were unable to advance, and they subsequently broke contact to allow the use of medium artillery after having lost one killed and four wounded. The following day A Company was deployed with tanks to assist a further assault by C Company in the bunker system, which was again found to have been abandoned by the VC after having suffered a number of casualties. Meanwhile, a series of minor contacts occurred as VC forces began returning to the area. In AO Tiki, D Company 4 RAR/NZ mounted a series of ambushes on the creeks which flowed into the Rung Sat. The VC had been using these watercourses extensively for logistic resupply and to gain access to the villages in the area. On 15 February 10 Platoon D Company had deployed to southern end of the battalion AO to mount a night ambush on a high bank on a sharp bend in the Suoi Cau river. The infantry were reinforced by 90 mm M67 recoilless rifles (RCLs) from the Tracker Platoon, which were placed on the flanks. At 21:03 six sampans carrying around 15 VC entered the engagement area moving from west to east and the ambush was initiated by splintex rounds from the RCLs as well as M60 machine-guns and small arms. At least two sampans were sunk and six VC killed before they were able to withdraw to the southern bank and engage the Australians with small arms and RPGs. At first light the next morning the Australians swept the area, wading through the shallow river at low tide, subsequently locating another damaged sampan, an AK-47, an RPG-2 and two RPG rounds.

On 16 February, just prior to a ceasefire for the Tết New Year festival, the Australian command had received information from an agent about the location of large weapon caches in the north of AO Tiki, and a large VC force was also expected to be in position. B and W Companies 4 RAR/NZ, each accompanied by a tracker team and a Centurion tank troop from B Squadron, 1st Armoured Regiment were subsequently tasked to patrol to the area by separate routes. Accompanied by the Hoi Chanh, B Company—under the command of Major Bill Reynolds—crossed an open area during the early afternoon and moved into some dense vegetation, patrolling up to an occupied VC position unaware. Well concealed in bunkers the defenders successfully initiated a command-detonated directional mine and opened fire with small-arms and RPGs, killing one Australian and wounding five others. In response the Australian tanks—under the command of Second Lieutenant Brian Sullivan—moved forward to support the infantry, and in the ensuring battle two were damaged, including one which was knocked out by an RPG which penetrated the turret and inflicted severe injuries on the crew. Yet under the leadership of Reynolds, B Company fought to regain its balance following the initial onslaught, and was able to withdraw under the fire of the surviving tanks which engaged the bunkers at point-blank with their 20 pounder main armament, using solid shot and canister anti-personnel rounds which stripped the undergrowth. The Australian casualties were moved back to safety by stretcher bearers who had moved forward under covering fire, and the damaged tank was also successfully recovered.

Meanwhile, the 4 RAR/NZ Regimental Medical Officer, Captain Dave Lewis had commandeered a Bell H-13 Sioux light observation helicopters from 161st Reconnaissance Flight and flew in to assist the treatment of the casualties. Despite his efforts however, one of the most badly injured soldiers succumbed to their wounds. The remainder of the casualties were then moved by helicopter to the Australian Field Hospital at Vung Tau. The Australians then called-in artillery fire which was adjusted onto the bunker system, with the 105 mm guns of the 104th Field Battery being augmented by those of the 102nd Field Battery in the neighbouring AO, and American 155 mm self-propelled guns. A number of air strikes were also directed onto the position, while Reynolds planned an attack to destroy the VC force. Gradually B Company gained the upper hand and prepared to assault the position, returning heavy fire with small arms while the tanks continued to engage the bunkers from close range. The contact had continued until late afternoon, however with the truce due to come into effect for Tet, American fire support would cease to be available at 17:00, after which a 24-hour cease-fire would commence. Circling overhead in another Sioux helicopter Greville protested, and although Pearson had supported him the Americans refused to provide offensive support despite the contact having been initiated by the VC. Reynolds could continue the assault if he wished, but he would only have the limited fire support from the two tanks capable of firing and the Australian field artillery, while the battalion mortars were out of range and would have been inadequate nonetheless.

Lacking the medium artillery and air strikes required to successfully assault the fortified position, B Company withdrew to a safe distance and kept the position under observation and fire. A follow-up attack schedule for the next day was also cancelled due to the unavailability of American artillery. During the night a large VC force was observed withdrawing, with one party of about 30 men passing close to a concealed Centurion; frustrated, the Australians observed the truce and held their fire. The next morning, 17 January, with the area now stripped bare of vegetation the devastation caused to the bunker system was obvious and it was clear that the position had been hit heavily by the Australian tanks and artillery. Although there were numerous signs of casualties, with a large number of blood trails and some damaged weapons the Australians found only three dead, with the VC once again having cleared the battlefield of the dead and wounded during the night. Later intelligence suggested that the position had been occupied by the headquarters of the 274th Regiment and one of its battalions and the Australians considered it likely that the VC battalion had fought a delaying action to allow the headquarters to withdraw, before itself retiring under cover of darkness. A thorough search of the area by the Australians was not possible however, and B Company was ordered to return to their patrol area to prepare for redeployment. The fighting had been one of the more significant actions of Operation Goodwood and for his leadership during this action Reynolds was awarded the Military Cross. Corporal Wayne Brown—the B Company Medical Assistant—was awarded the Military Medal, while Sullivan and Brett were both Mentioned in Despatches.

=== Operation Goodwood concludes, 17–19 February 1969 ===
Just after dusk on 17 January, following the end of the Tet truce, a large force attacked a South Vietnamese post across the river on 4 RAR/NZ's western boundary, before withdrawing back along a creek towards FSB Janice. At 01:45 on 18 February a sentry from D Company had detected noise and movement to the south, just outside the wire. Estimated at up to company strength, the VC were observed clearly through a Starlight scope and were moving noisily, likely unaware of their proximity to the fire support base. Meanwhile, the mortar fire controller (MFC) had moved to the sentry position, and as the VC force commenced crossing the creek they were engaged by the Australians with more than 100 rounds of mortar fire at a range of just 200 metres (220 yd) from the base plate location. The initial bombardment caused confusion among the VC and they took no evasive action, instead continuing to attempt to cross the creek. Several more rounds then landed among them, causing numerous casualties and forcing the survivors to withdraw. As with previous contacts, the VC once again demonstrated their skill in removing their casualties from the battlefield and clearing patrols sent out at first light by the Australians found no bodies, although numerous blood trails and drag marks were observed indicating that the VC had suffered heavily. A large quantity of discarded weapons, equipment and ammunition was captured by the Australians however, including seven AK-47s, four RPG-2s, an L1A1 Self Loading Rifle, a pistol, a 12.7 mm heavy machine-gun and armour piercing rounds.

Meanwhile, 9 RAR had continued to maintain its blocking operations, however on 16 February it was redeployed to AO Belconnen to shield the American bases at Long Binh and Biên Hòa against attacks expected during Tet as part of a new operation, known as Operation Federal. Later, in response to the upcoming communist offensive Pearson also warned Greville to be prepared to move 4 RAR/NZ further north to help defend Long Binh and Biên Hòa. With the Australians having penetrated into the heart of a major VC sanctuary, it was likely that the VC had left a large number of caches in the area after being forced to withdraw, however time would not permit 4 RAR/NZ to conduct a thorough search of the area. Yet even as the operation was winding down V Company 4 RAR/NZ had a number of successful contacts in AO Riverdale over the next two days, killing at least two VC in two separate incidents on 18 and 19 February.

== Aftermath ==
After 78 days Operation Goodwood concluded on 19 February 1969. FSB Julia closed and HQ 1 ATF moved to FSB Kerry in preparation for upcoming operations. Australian casualties included 21 killed and 91 wounded, New Zealand casualties included one killed and six wounded, South Vietnamese casualties were 31 killed and 81 wounded, U.S casualties were seven wounded. PAVN/VC losses amounted to at least 245 killed, 39 possibly killed, 45 wounded and 17 captured, during 274 separate contacts. Nearly 2,000 bunkers were uncovered and many destroyed, while more than 280 rocket propelled grenades, 70 anti-personnel mines, 490 grenades and 450 pounds of explosives were captured. Throughout the operation the bulk of the contacts had been initiated by the Australians, a reverse of the American trend in which more than two-thirds of actions were normally initiated by the VC. Although there were few major actions, the operation was considered a success by the Australians and following it VC activity in 1 ATFs area of operations visibly lessened as the VC were forced to abandon their permanent bases in the Hat Dich and disrupting their preparations for upcoming offensive operations. Operation Goodwood was one of the longest out of province operations mounted by the Australians during the war and was also the last Australian multi-battalion operation to be fought across the border with third-country forces. From 1969 most operations tended to be platoon and company-sized, and confined to Phước Tuy. It had been a period of intense activity for the Australians and the Royal Australian Regiment, the 3rd Cavalry Regiment and 1st Armoured Regiment were subsequently awarded the battle honour "Hat Dich", one of only five presented to Australian units during the war.

There was little respite for the Australians though, with both 4 RAR/NZ and 9 RAR immediately redeploying in anticipation of another PAVN/VC offensive during Tet, under Operation Federal. This operation in late-February 1969 saw 1 ATF—less one battalion and other elements required to secure its base in Nui Dat—once again operating outside Phước Tuy Province to secure the major bases of Long Binh, Biên Hòa and the capital Saigon from an impending offensive. However, unlike the previous two episodes—Operation Coburg in January and February 1968 and Operation Thoan Thang I in May 1968 which had both involved large-scale attacks on the Australian positions, Operational Federal was less intensive and was limited to ambushing and patrolling, with none of the Australian fire support bases subjected to attack. 1 RAR subsequently returned to Australia after being relieved by 5 RAR—under the command of Lieutenant Colonel Colin Kahn—on 15 February. Arriving in Sydney on 28 February 1969, 1 RAR was welcomed home with a march through the city. During the tour—its second in South Vietnam—the battalion had killed at least 276 VC and destroyed a large number of bunkers, camps, and caches and had been heavily involved in the Battle of Coral–Balmoral. 1 RAR's own casualties had been high however, losing 31 killed and 165 wounded.

The 1969 Tet offensive began in the early hours of 23 February, with PAVN/VC attacks against US and ARVN installations and district capitals. Lacking the ferocity of the 1968 Tet Offensive, the outburst soon slackened, however. In III CTZ, where 1 ATF operated, over a period of five days there were 175 attacks by fire and just 15 ground assaults, while the PAVN/VC suffered over 1,800 killed and 320 captured. Indeed, for the Australians the offensive proved to be only a series of relatively minor disturbances when compared to that of the year before; perhaps demoralised following the earlier mauling at Coral and Balmoral the VC declined to attack major South Vietnamese and US installations in force. Regardless, with the bulk of 1 ATF operating away from Nui Dat in first half of 1969, the VC again became active in the populated central and southern areas of Phước Tuy Province, including Dat Do and Long Dien and the villages between Dat Do and the coast. Although ARVN forces were by now operating in these areas, VC guerrilla groups operated with freedom, especially at night. As a consequence Australian operations in mid-1969 were forced to focus on the area around Dat Do and the Long Hải Hills, as they attempted to restrict the VC's access to the local population. Later, on 6–7 June 1969 the Australians were engaged in fierce close-quarter house-to-house fighting with PAVN/VC forces during the Battle of Binh Ba.

== Notes ==
Footnotes

Citations
