= 1st Australian Civil Affairs Unit =

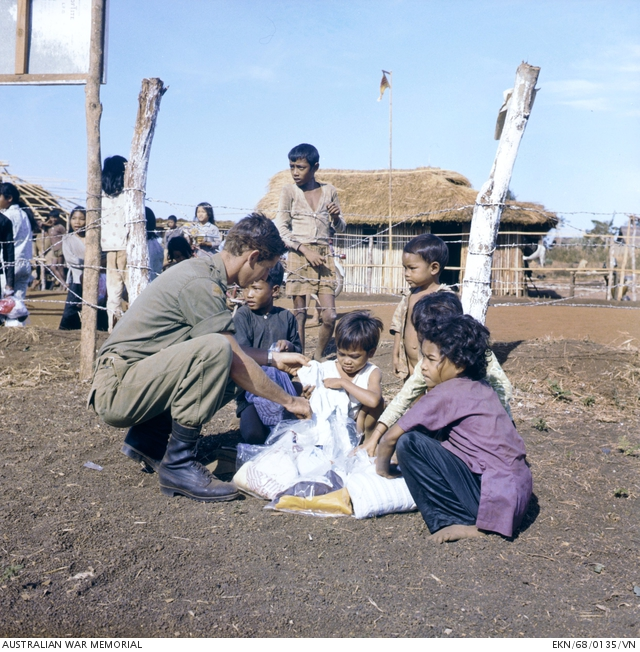
- 1st Australian Civil Affairs Unit soldier distributes clothing to children in 1968 From Wikimedia Commons, the free media repository
- Active: 1967–1972
- Country: Australia
- Branch: Australian Army
- Type: Civil affairs
- Role: Civic action
- Size: ~40–60+ men
- Part of: Australian Force Vietnam
- Garrison/HQ: Nui Dat, South Vietnam

Commanders
- Notable commanders: Peter Gration Kevin Latchford

The 1st Australian Civil Affairs Unit (1 ACAU) was raised in 1967 to coordinate the Australian Army's contribution to the US and allied Pacification Program during the Vietnam War, operating in Phuoc Tuy Province. Although other Australian units also conducted civic action projects in South Vietnam at various times, 1 ACAU had the primary responsibility for them once it was deployed. It was withdrawn from South Vietnam in November 1971.

== Background ==
During the 1960s and early 1970s, civic action projects were undertaken on an increasing scale by the US, Australia and other countries of the Free World Military Assistance Forces throughout South Vietnam. According to Barry Smith civic action was not primarily motivated by altruism, but rather the political imperative of winning the support of the South Vietnamese people for the central government in Saigon. Civic action, wherever and by whoever performed, was part of a nationwide program with long-term political and military objectives. From the Australian point of view, civic action was also used to help promote goodwill towards Australian forces in South Vietnam and Australia generally.

When the 1st Australian Task Force (1 ATF) first arrived in Phuoc Tuy Province in mid-1966, the military security situation was poor. The province had not been under government control for several years before the task force arrived. Most roads could not be travelled by single vehicles. Some roads required fully escorted convoys before they could be traversed. The province's population was about 104,000, the large majority of whom lived in and around Baria, Hoa Long, Long Dien and Dat Do in the central and southern parts of Phuoc Tuy Province. The main religions were Buddhism and Catholicism.

Members of the 1st Battalion, Royal Australian Regiment (1 RAR) had conducted civic action projects while deployed in Bien Hoa Province in 1965. However, when Australia assumed responsibility for Phuoc Tuy Province it did not have a dedicated civil affairs capability. Consequently, four warrant officers from the Australian Army Training Team Vietnam (AATTV) were attached to 1 ATF under Captain Bob Rooney in May 1966, and the small group began carrying out civic action-type projects to assist the local population in Phuoc Tuy Province. It was taken over in mid-1966 by Major John Donohoe. At the time there was also a US Army unit operating in the province conducting civic action projects. This was the 14th AA Platoon, 2nd Civil Affairs Company, which was attached to 1 ACAU after the latter arrived in Nui Dat. (Note: The US platoon remained after 1 ACAU arrived in June 1967, and continued to operate in Phuoc Tuy Province for approximately another 18 months, but in practice the two operated separately.) Despite these measures the Australian civic action program remained ad hoc, and was found difficult to sustain due to the other operational demands placed on 1 ATF.

== History ==
=== Formation ===
The 1st Australian Civil Affairs Unit (1 ACAU) was raised at Middle Head in Sydney on 10 April 1967 with an establishment of ten officers and 39 other ranks. Under the command of Lieutenant Colonel John McDonagh, Royal Australian Engineers (RAE), in June 1967 it moved to Nui Dat in Phuoc Tuy Province, South Vietnam. (Note: Following the arrival of 1 ACAU in Vietnam AATTV personnel were no longer detached to 1 ATF for civic action duties.) During its time in South Vietnam, 1 ACAU was co-located at Nui Dat with 1 ATF; however, it was a unit of Headquarters Australian Force Vietnam (HQ AFV) in Saigon, and was not part of 1 ATF. 1 ACAU's Commanding Officer had direct access to the Commander AFV. On day-to-day operational matters, CO 1 ACAU worked closely with Commander 1 ATF. 1 ACAU consisted of a headquarters/administration group plus operational detachments with specific responsibilities. It had detachments specialising in engineering, medical support, education and agriculture. In addition to the section at Nui Dat, a small section was also established at Vung Tau with the 1st Australian Logistic Support Group (1 ALSG). This section was established with just one officer and no technical or support staff other than a driver and an interpreter, and operated entirely using contract labour.

=== Operations ===
Funded through the Department of External Affairs, and in part by the South East Asian Treaty Organization (SEATO), the activities, size and shape of civil affairs changed constantly between 1967 and 1971. During the first three years (1966–69) of Australian operations in Phuoc Tuy Province the civil affairs unit was often used as an "adjunct to military operations", providing assistance during village cordon and search operations and being heavily involved in the population resettlement program. It was also involved in providing aid to the local population when they were affected by the fighting, for instance in the aftermath of the Battle of Binh Ba in June 1969 when much of the village was heavily damaged. In the final years of 1 ATF's deployment (1969–71), the unit was more independent, primarily undertaking its own programs to assist the villages and South Vietnamese administration.

The activities of 1 ACAU were based on principles calculated to achieve maximum impact on the civilian population, while bearing in mind that the primary aim of civic action was to win the support of the local population for the Saigon regime. Firstly, the local population had to "own" the project. If they felt a sense of ownership, and the project was subsequently damaged or destroyed by the Vietcong (VC), then the outcome would be antagonism towards them. Ownership involved encouraging the local population to suggest or otherwise originate projects, and to actively participate in their construction, either wholly or partly. Secondly, the projects had to extend over a reasonable period of time to allow the participating soldiers to become known and trusted by the villagers. Thirdly, they were initiated in the name of the appropriate South Vietnamese ministry, for example education and health. Fourthly, it was desirable that the projects lent themselves to publicity. Fifthly, the results had to be observable, measurable and tangible, and ideally impact beneficially on as many people as possible. Lastly, wherever possible, credit was always given to the South Vietnamese government (even if in reality it was quite obvious to the villagers that it was Australia and Australians providing the project).

Construction was one of 1 ACAU's main activities, and the commander of the unit was often an engineer. The Engineer Detachment typically installed Southern Cross windmills (14 were built in all) and constructed schools and school rooms, market buildings, fences, and medical dispensaries. Major projects included designing and building a new village called Soui Nghe beside Route 2 north of the task force base, and Project 399 which involved the construction of 600 houses for Army of the Republic of Vietnam (ARVN) soldiers around the province. Main areas of effort included the construction of village markets and the provision of water supplies. Other significant construction projects included repairing, widening and rebuilding roads and bridges and the renovation of the hospital in Baria.

The Medical Detachment was heavily involved in operations known as Medical Civil Action Programs (MEDCAPS), conducted every day in provincial villages. By 1969, MEDCAPS were incorporated into Integrated Civil Action Programs (ICAPS), which were conducted by medical and other teams that would deploy overnight to a village and treat anyone who requested assistance. A movie screen would be erected nearby and those in the queue for treatment, and other villagers, would watch the films that were chosen to promote the South Vietnamese government at the expense of the VC and North Vietnamese People's Army of Vietnam (PAVN) forces. Dental Civil Action Programs (DENTCAPS) were also carried out by 1 ATF units other than 1 ACAU. The 1 ACAU Medical Detachment co-ordinated all MEDCAPS and DENTCAPS conducted by 1 ATF units. The detachment's head was also the province Civil Operations and Revolutionary Development (CORDS) adviser on medical matters.

Typical tasks for the Education Detachment included providing advice on where new schools could be built, providing educational supplies to schools, and conducting English language classes. These classes were delivered by Australian soldiers who would spend time alone in villages at schools and proved very popular. In early 1969, the North Vietnamese authorities placed a price on the head of the then commander of the CAU, Lieutenant Colonel Kevin Latchford, suggesting their concern about the positive impact the unit was having on the local population. During 1969–70, when 1 ACAU was under the command of Lieutenant Colonel Peter Gration, the Education Detachment also became responsible for youth and sports activities in Phuoc Tuy Province. At this time, the detachment commander was also the Province CORDS adviser on Education, and its second-in-command was the Province CORDS adviser on youth and sports matters, co-coordinating sporting activities in Phuoc Tuy Province.

The Liaison Detachment consisted of Vietnamese-speaking Australian officers trained at the RAAF School of Languages in Point Cook, Victoria. Described by Gration as "the eyes and ears" of 1 ACAU, the Liaison Officers (LOs) were responsible for interacting with the civilian population on a daily basis, assessing where projects might be warranted, preparing feasibility studies, and developing close contacts at village level. Working with only their drivers, LOs were widely known and accepted by local Vietnamese. They spent most of their time, including at one point up to three nights a week, in local villages. Apart from watching for opportunities for civic action projects, LOs would also deliver mail from VC prisoners of war incarcerated around the country to their families in Phuoc Tuy Province, and collect mail and gifts from the families for the prisoners to be delivered to them. LOs gave Vietnamese language presentations to former VC and PAVN soldiers who defected to the south under the Chieu Hoi (Open Arms) program, and disbursed compensation payments to local Vietnamese families when required. On occasions, when visitors to the province required an Australian interpreter, LOs were often tasked. For example, politicians and journalists visiting from Australia often preferred to use Australians as guides and interpreters.

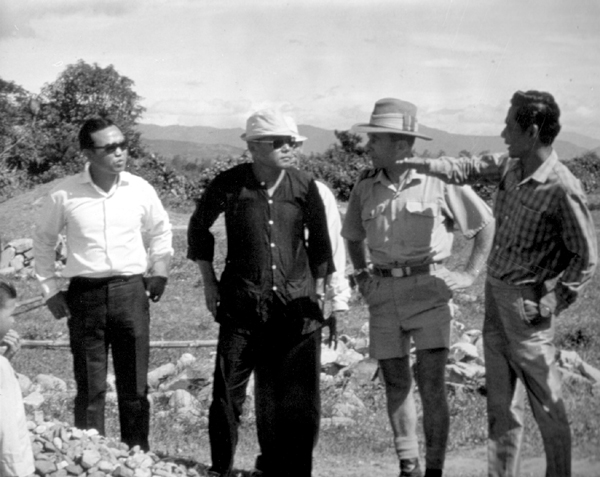
Members of an Australian civic action team confer with Vietnamese village officials on plans for local improvements

The Agricultural Detachment provided advice on, and delivered supplies for, projects such as "miracle" rice and sorghum demonstration crops, and other crop growing techniques. It was also responsible for animal husbandry projects when these developed from about 1969 onward. A typical project was provision of the necessary supplies and animals for local civilians to start their own chicken or pig farms.

Due to the nature of their work 1 ACAU personnel were quite vulnerable to enemy action and potentially could have suffered heavy casualties if the VC had decided to target them. Many members spent time alone in villages while civil affairs vehicles often traveled routes with just a driver and one passenger. Yet overall, there was little hostile action against members of the unit. In the early days after the unit's arrival in Nui Dat, there were sniper incidents in Hoa Long, and a medical team became involved in a contact in Hoi My, south of Dat Do, during which several 1 ACAU members sustained minor gunshot wounds. There were other minor incidents later also, for example, when the VC destroyed the water reticulation system on Long Son island, just days after it came into operation. However, by 1969–70 the security situation in the province had greatly improved.

Towards the end of the 1960s the US emphasis on Pacification increased throughout South Vietnam. The volume of civic action projects being carried out by Australian forces also increased during this time. Whilst previously they had been predominantly carried out by 1 ACAU, units from 1 ATF increasingly assisted with such activities during 1969–70. (Note: A total of around 300 Australian personnel were employed full-time on civic action projects during this period. These included 1 ACAU personnel who were assisted by two engineer construction squadrons and six-to-ten man teams provided by infantry and artillery units within 1 ATF.) By this time, 1 ACAU's commanding officer was responsible for the co-ordination of all military civic action by Australian troops in Vietnam, including those at Vung Tau and Phan Rang (where the Royal Australian Air Force had units), and Saigon, although the major focus of Australian civic action efforts was in Phuoc Tuy Province. In 1969 every individual unit of 1 ATF at Nui Dat was at one stage directed to put resources into civic action projects. For example, 5 RAR built a two-room school in Ong Trinh hamlet, alongside Route 15 between Baria and Bien Hoa. However, as the civic aid program wound down as part of the process of Vietnamization, 1 ACAU again became the main agency for such programs from mid-1970 until late 1971. By 1970 the unit had grown to a strength of 55 men.

By early 1971 Australian civic action programs in Vietnam had included the construction of market places, six dispensaries, 71 classrooms, four community centres, 17 playgrounds, enhanced water supplies for 14 villages, as well as providing medical treatment for 200,000 people and another 100,000 dental treatments. In addition engineers had also rebuilt a number of the provinces main roads including Route 2 which ran from Baria to the northern provincial border, Route 44 from Baria to Long Hai, and Route 23 between Dat Do and Xuyen Moc. 1 ACAU remained in Vietnam until 25 November 1971, after which it returned to Australia as part of the withdrawal of its forces from the country.

== Association ==
Following their participation in the 1987 Welcome Home Parade in Sydney, former 1 ACAU members formed the 1st Australian Civil Affairs Unit Association on 10 April 1988. Its aims and objectives are to:

- create and cherish a bond of comradeship between all members of the Association;
- assist members and the families of deceased members whenever necessary;
- facilitate communication between members;
- keep members informed of the Association's activities and other relevant information; and
- support projects that aim to improve the well being of the citizens of Vietnam.

== Commanding officers ==
The following officers commanded 1 ACAU:

- Lieutenant Colonel John McDonagh, RAE (1967–68);
- Lieutenant Colonel Kevin Latchford, RAAC (1968–69);
- Lieutenant Colonel Peter Gration, RAE (1969–70);
- Lieutenant Colonel Paddy Outridge, RA Inf (1970–71); and
- Lieutenant Colonel Laurie Wright, RAE (1971).

== Notes ==
Footnotes

Citations
