= D440 Battalion =

- Active: 1968–1970
- Allegiance: Viet Cong
- Branch: National Liberation Front for Southern Vietnam
- Role: Guerilla
- Size: 350 men
- Engagements: Vietnam War

The VC D440 Battalion, also known as the Viet Cong D440 Provincial Mobile Battalion, was a Local Force battalion of the Viet Cong (VC) during the Vietnam War. The battalion operated in the Phước Tuy and Long Khánh provinces usually along Route 2. It was formed in 1968 under the command of Comrade Hai Tinh and consisted mainly of North Vietnamese Army (NVA) personnel.

From 1966 to 1971 Phuoc Tuy Province was the area of South Vietnam that was assigned to Australian and New Zealand forces to defend against Communist incursions and provide support to South Vietnamese government, as part of the 1st Australian Task Force (1 ATF).

The battalion's first major encounter with the Australians and New Zealanders was during Operation Lavarack launched by 1 ATF in May 1969, and concluding 30 June 1969. During Operation Lavarack the battalion along with other People's Army of Vietnam (PAVN) and VC guerrilla elements participated in the battle of Binh Ba but were expelled by 1 ATF forces. The village of Binh Ba was completely destroyed during the battle. As a result of the failure at Binh Ba all PAVN forces including D440 Battalion were temporarily forced out of Phuoc Tuy, retreating to Long Khánh Province.

Overall the unit generally performed poorly against Australian and New Zealand forces however, and it was eventually disbanded in August 1970 with most of its personnel transferred to the locally manned D445 Battalion.
