= Battle of Binh Ba =

Part of the Vietnam War (1969)

Coordinates: 10°35′24″N 107°13′48″E

- Part of the Vietnam War
- Australian troops and armour during Operation Hammer.
Date	6–8 June 1969
Location	Binh Ba, Phuoc Tuy Province, South Vietnam
Result	Australian victory

Belligerents
Viet Cong; North Vietnam	Australia; South Vietnam

Commanders and leaders
Unknown	Colin Khan

Units involved
D440 Battalion (North Vietnam) 33rd Regiment	5 RAR; 1st Armoured Regiment 3 Cavalry Regiment 105th Medium Battery; No. 9 Squadron RAAF

Strength
Two Companies, Light Infantry	Two infantry companies

Casualties and losses
Australians claim: 107 killed 6 wounded 8 captured	1 killed 10 wounded

The Battle of Binh Ba (6–8 June 1969), also known as Operation Hammer, took place during the Vietnam War. The action occurred when Australian Army troops from the 5th Battalion, Royal Australian Regiment (5 RAR) fought a combined force of People's Army of Vietnam (PAVN) and Viet Cong (VC), including a company from the PAVN 33rd Regiment and elements of the VC D440 Battalion, in the village of Bình Ba, 5 kilometres (3.1 mi) north of Nui Dat in Phuoc Tuy Province. The battle was unusual in Australian combat experience in South Vietnam as it involved fierce close-quarter house-to-house fighting, although the majority of enemy killed was through heavy artillery and air-bombardment. In response to PAVN/VC attempts to capture Binh Ba the Australians assaulted the village with infantry, armour and helicopter gunships, routing the VC and largely destroying the village itself. Such battles were not the norm in Phuoc Tuy, however, and the heavy losses suffered by the PAVN/VC forced them to temporarily leave the province. Although the Australians did encounter PAVN/VC Main Force units in the years to come, the battle marked the end of such large-scale clashes, and ranks as one of the major Australian victories of the war.

== Prelude ==
Situated north of the 1st Australian Task Force (1 ATF) base at Nui Dat on the western side of Route 2, the village of Bình Ba had a population of around 3,000 people—mainly farmers and rubber plantation workers. Tidy and rectangular in shape, and mainly constructed of solid brick and tile, Bình Ba was well known to the Australians. Indeed, during 5 RAR's first tour in Vietnam a rifle company and a mortar section had been briefly stationed within the village itself. This strategy proved to be a deterrent to the VC tax collectors and assassination squads taking control of the village. The drain on the finite resources of the small Australian force proved to be too much however, and the village was later left to the protection of South Vietnamese Regional Forces.

In an attempt to demonstrate that they could move freely within the province, a combined force including a company from the PAVN 33rd Regiment, elements of the VC D440 Provincial Mobile Battalion, the Bình Ba and Ngãi Giao Guerrilla Squad and the Châu Đốc District Company had occupied Bình Ba on the evening of 5–6 June 1969. (Note: According to Chamberlain two battalions of the 33rd Regiment were deployed in the area, with the move of the regiment south-west from Long Khánh Province into Phuoc Tuy having been monitored by 1 ATF's signals intelligence unit.) In response, Army of the Republic of Vietnam (ARVN) forces were sent from Duc Thanh the following morning. Initial intelligence suggested that a group of about platoon strength had infiltrated the village. Meanwhile, during a separate operation 6 RAR had also been engaged in a heavy contact several kilometres north of the task force base and at 08:00 on 6 June, an Australian Centurion tank and an armoured recovery vehicle moving through Bình Ba to assist 6 RAR were fired upon. A rocket propelled grenade (RPG) struck the Centurion penetrating the turret, and causing damage to the tank and severe injuries to one of the crewman. The district commander subsequently asked 1 ATF for assistance in clearing Bình Ba.

== Battle ==
The 1 ATF Ready Reaction Force under the command of Major Murray Blake consisted of an understrength D Company 5 RAR (of just 65 men), a troop of Centurion tanks from the 1st Armoured Regiment and a troop of M-113 armoured personnel carriers from the 3rd Cavalry Regiment and subsequently reacted to the incident. In direct support was 105th Battery, Royal Australian Artillery. Meanwhile, elements of the 1st Battalion, 33rd Regiment took up defensive positions within the village. By 10:30 the Australians approached Bình Ba from the south, and were engaged by a volley of RPG fire from a row of houses. After evacuating much of the town's population, D Company assaulted the village from east to west following preparation from helicopter gunships of No. 9 Squadron RAAF. Regional Force troops were deployed into blocking positions. Four tanks led the assault, with the infantry remaining mounted in the APCs following behind.

The Australians reached the edge of the village at 11:20, coming under light fire. Initially the tanks were effective for close action, however by the time the marketplace had been reached in the centre of the town concealed RPG-7s had caused external damage to two Centurions, whilst another was penetrated. Within an hour, three of the four tanks used in the initial assault were disabled through damage and crew casualties. It became clear that the initial assessments of PAVN/VC strength had been inaccurate, and was probably closer to a battalion than a platoon. In addition helicopters overhead reported another large enemy force of up to 60 moving to the south and west. Blake subsequently decided to swing the attack left, in order to clear the southern edge of the town before moving out to western side of Bình Ba. As the Australian armour moved through the rubber trees they clashed with a company forming up to counterattack, inflicting heavy casualties on the PAVN/VC in the process.

VC dead and destroyed buildings in Binh Ba during the battle.

By 14:00 the Australians were bolstered by additional troops from B Company 5 RAR, under Major Rein Harring, which took up blocking positions to south and east. The Commanding Officer of 5 RAR, Lieutenant Colonel Colin Khan, now assumed command of the battle. With a fresh troop of tanks together with APC support, D Company conducted a second assault on the village, this time with the infantry leading. One tank and two M113s accompanied each platoon in close support. The lead platoon made contact with the enemy immediately and the advance was slow due to the need to clear every house. The PAVN/VC occupying the houses fired on the Australians from the windows and doorways before withdrawing into tunnels as they passed. An Australian soldier—Private Wayne Teeling—was killed by a shot through the neck as his team approached the first line of houses. A tank fired one round of HE into the building occupied by the PAVN/VC. The house exploded, and the clearing team assaulted immediately. Six dead were found in the ruins.

This type of action was typical all along D Company's assault line and every time the Australians received fire from a building, tank rounds were used to breach the walls and a small team of infantry would conduct room clearance until all resistance was quelled. During the fighting some of the PAVN/VC had discarded their uniforms and weapons and attempted to mingle with the pockets of civilians that were unable to escape. The continued presence of civilians in the village required the Australians to expose themselves to extreme danger while trying to usher these groups to the rear of the battle zone. Others tried to flee the village, or hide in the small air raid bunkers attached to every house. The fighting continued all afternoon and only ended at last light. With Bình Ba still insecure, D Company and their armoured support subsequently occupied a defensive harbour for the night, exhausted by the fighting. Overnight B Company killed two VC trying to break out to the south.

At 06:00 on 7 June B Company intercepted a PAVN/VC company attempting to enter the town, and after blocking the exit and entry routes—and again supported by armour—they forced them to withdraw. On the second day the clearing of the village continued. D Company, with a platoon from B Company attached, met sporadic resistance from a number of small groups still holed up in the village. To fully clear the village every bunker, house and any likely areas of concealment had to be searched. Later in the morning South Vietnamese forces in the northern hamlet of Duc Trung came under attack, and B Company and the Assault Pioneer Platoon were deployed to provide assistance. Indeed, most of the action now centred on Duc Trung, with a helicopter reporting a force of up to 80 PAVN/VC troops moving between the buildings. With the pioneers blocking to the south a Regional Force reaction company cleared the village, however the PAVN/VC had already left. By 13:00 heavy firing again broke out in Duc Trung, with the South Vietnamese rapidly overrun by over a hundred PAVN/VC. Accurate artillery fire was effective in stabilising the situation, however, and B Company with a troop of tanks swept the hamlet. During the afternoon D Company continued to clear Bình Ba and further close-quarter fighting followed before the Australians withdrew to allow the South Vietnamese to complete the clearance. By the evening the village was secure, and B and D Companies adopted blocking positions overnight.

== Aftermath ==
The battlefield at Binh Ba after the fighting.

Operation Hammer concluded by 09:00 on 8 June with one final sweep carried out that morning to ensure that Bình Ba was clear. By this time a large PAVN/VC force had been defeated by the Australians, and the village practically destroyed. Indeed, Bình Ba was so badly damaged that many of the villagers whose homes were destroyed were subsequently resettled with the help of the 1st Australian Civil Affairs Unit. Despite efforts to clear the village of civilians before the battle, a large but unknown number of civilians had undoubtedly died during the fighting. This fact, coupled with the one-sided casualty count, later led to claims in the media of an Australian atrocity. One Australian had been killed and 10 wounded, while PAVN/VC losses included at least 107 killed, six wounded and eight captured.

The battle was one of the major victories of the Australians in South Vietnam and although they would occasionally encounter PAVN/VC Main Force units in the future, it effectively marked the end of such large-scale clashes. Indeed, as a result of such heavy losses suffered at Bình Ba the PAVN were temporarily forced to move out of Phuoc Tuy and into the adjoining province of Long Khánh. The Royal Australian Regiment, the 3rd Cavalry Regiment and 1st Armoured Regiment were subsequently awarded the battle honour 'Binh Ba', one of only five presented to Australian units during the war.

== Notes ==
Footnotes

Citations
