= NLF and PAVN logistics and equipment =

Logistics of Vietnamese armies

Trailporters

The Viet Cong and the North Vietnamese People's Army of Vietnam (PAVN) used well-organized logistics methods to supply and equip their fighting forces. This logistics organization helped greatly in their war against the American and South Vietnamese military during the Vietnam War.

The Viet Cong's full-time soldiers were referred to as the "Main Force" (Quân chủ lực). The National Liberation Front (NLF) was a united front designed to encourage non-communists to support the insurgency in the south. The term NVA identifies regular troops of the North Vietnamese Army as they were commonly known by their Western opponents. Collectively, both forces were part of PAVN which made up all armed forces of North Vietnam.

== VC/PAVN equipment and weapons ==
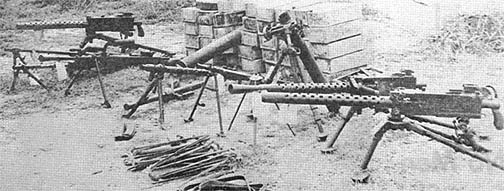
Captured VC weaponry, including M1919 Browning machine guns, World War II-era German MG-34 machine guns, Soviet RP-46, and mortars.

Overall, the supplies and equipment of communist units were adequate, and their infantry small-arms were a match for those of their opponents. Contrary to some popular impressions of simple peasant farmers armed with low quality or obsolete weapons, the VC and PAVN main units (as well as the local forces in the latter years) were well equipped with modern arms either from Soviet bloc or Chinese sources. In the early years of the insurgency in the South a larger variety of weapons were used, ranging from World War I-era bolt-action rifles to World War II-era weapons, with procurement via a wide range of methods. Such variation and diversity lessened and standardized as the war went on. By 1970, the communist inventory was mostly standardized, even at the village guerrilla level.

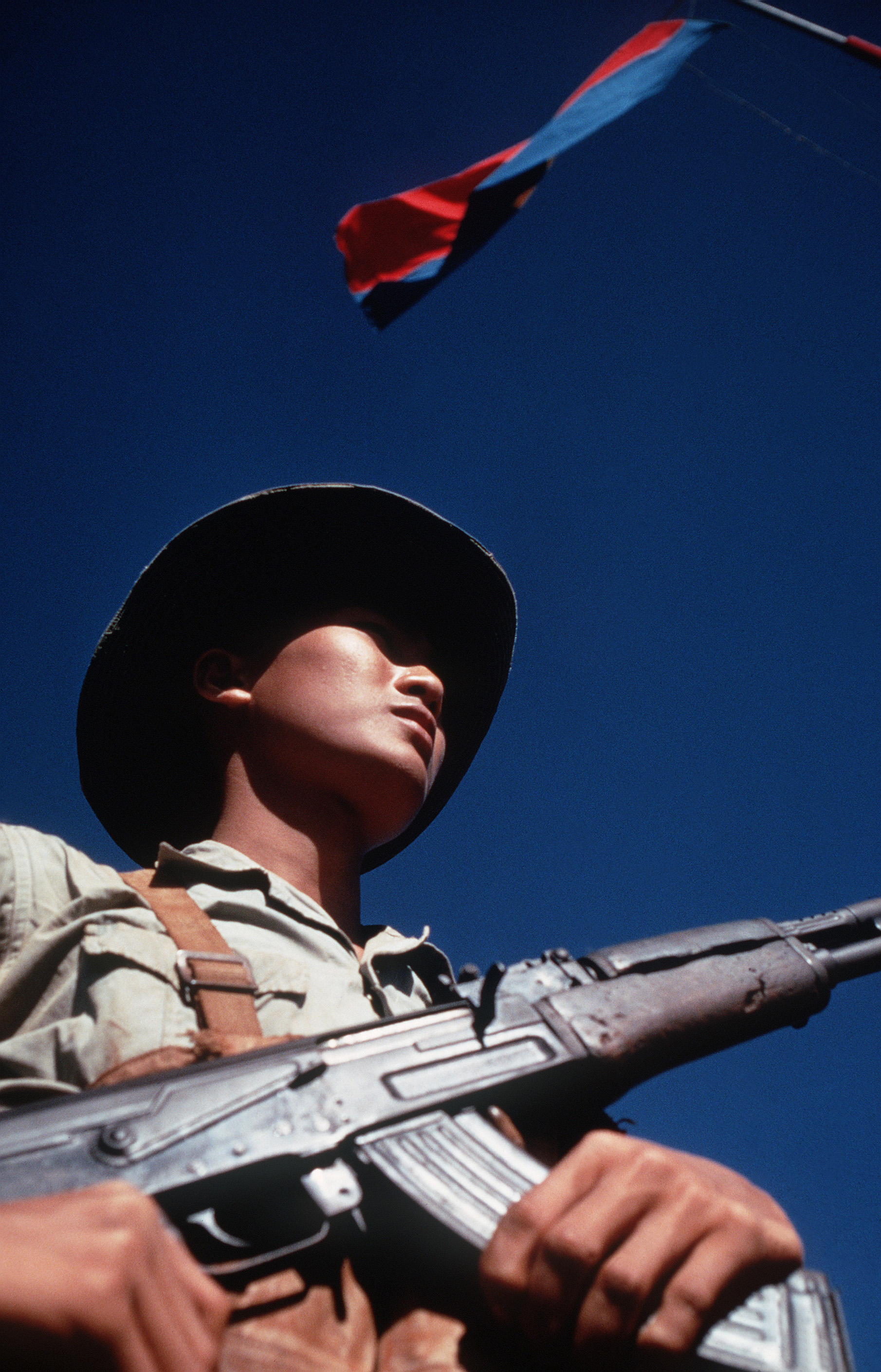
Vietcong guerrilla stands beneath a Vietcong flag carrying his AK-47 rifle

Weapons used by the VC were originally a varied mixture of both French weapons from the days of French Indochina, captured enemy weapons and Soviet and Chinese support, including both newly produced weapons, old stockpiles and captured enemy stockpiles from World War II. Common weapons included the French MAS-36 and other weapons left behind from the First Indochina War, the Soviet Mosin-Nagant, especially M1944 carbines, mostly by way of China. Mauser Kar98k rifles, both of captured German origin by way of Soviet Union or Chinese-made Chiang Kai-shek rifles were also provided as military aid. Japanese Arisaka rifles were also used in the earlier stages of the war and the M1 Carbine was a common and popular weapon captured from enemy ARVN troops.

The most common infantry weapons of the PAVN was the Soviet SKS carbine or its Chinese variant. Gradually, PAVN units were refitted with more modern AK-47 rifles from China, the Soviet Union, and other Warsaw Pact countries. The SKS carbines were passed down to the guerrillas, which were later armed with AK rifles themselves. Both weapons used the same intermediate 7.62mm cartridge, which eased logistics.

The 7.62mm round was also interchangeable with the Soviet RPD light machine gun, another standard infantry weapon of the VC/PAVN. Early units of PAVN had also made use of the Soviet RP-46 machine gun and the variety of weapons of the VC also included Chinese made ZB vz. 26, French FM 24/29, Soviet DP-28, captured M1918 BAR automatic rifles and even ex-German MG-34 (for Anti-Air use). Note that all Soviet weapons also had common Chinese copies.

Heavier machine guns were used in fixed mode as anti-aircraft weapons or carried disassembled due to their weight, to be used in set piece assaults. Chinese Type 24, Soviet Maxim, SG-43 and DShK, as well as captured Browning M1919 were used in these roles.

Submachine guns were also used by the PAVN early on, before being more and more by replaced by AK-47 automatic rifles, which made the army pass them down to the VC. The two most common types included the French MAT 49, using either its original 9×19mm ammunition or having been converted to use the 7.62×25mm Tokarev cartridge, and the Soviet/Chinese PPSh-41, often modified and converted in PAVN arsenals to the K-50M. Other types used by the less standardized VC included the Soviet PPS-43, captured or Chinese produced M1 Thompson and M3 Grease Guns, and ex-German MP 40. Late war PAVN special units, such as Đặc Công sappers, even made use of some modern SA vz. 61 and PM-63 RAK machine pistols of Czech and Polish origin.

Communist units also employed mortars frequently, with the Soviet 82mm and its Chinese variants being the most common alongside 60mm Chinese Type 31 and Type 63, American M2 mortar, French Brandt Mle 1935 and 81mm Brandt Mle 27/31.

Extensive use was made of the very effective Soviet-designed rocket propelled grenade anti-tank grenade launcher, the RPG-2 and RPG-7, commonly known as the B-40 and B-41, respectively. They were originally designed for use against armored vehicles but it was adapted for anti-personnel use to good effect. Recoilless rifles against bunkers, buildings and vehicles included American and Chinese variants of the 57mm M18 and 75mm M20 recoilless rifle, as well as the Soviet 73mm SPG-9. They also made use of the Soviet/Chinese 122mm rocket which was used effectively against populated areas and large installations such as airfields. While inaccurate compared to more sophisticated weapons, the 122 mm rocket made an effective terror weapon when deployed against civilian targets. Other rocket types included tube-launched Chinese 107mm and Soviet 140mm variants.

The VC/PAVN relied heavily on heavy machine guns and standard Soviet-designed anti-aircraft batteries like the ZPU-series for air defense functions. In the latter year of the conflict, field units of the VC/PAVN deployed Soviet SA-7 Man-portable air-defense system that presented a significant challenge to US air dominance, particularly helicopters. For strategic aerial defense, the North deployed one of the densest and most sophisticated air-defense systems in the world based on Soviet surface-to-air missile missiles and radar batteries.

The VC/PAVN used a wide variety of grenades from explosives inserted into discarded American C-ration cans to modern Chicom types. Booby traps were the province of guerrilla level forces more so than the VC/PAVN regulars. The infamous punji sticks soaked in excrement and urine received much press, but they were of negligible effect compared to the massive quantity of anti-personnel and anti-vehicle mines deployed by main communist units. These quantities increased vastly as the North stepped up infiltration into the South. Mines and booby traps applied significant psychological pressure on US/ARVN forces and slowed and disrupted both military operations and civilian life.

Fighting a mobile guerrilla war much of the time, the VC/PAVN could not deploy large quantities of heavy artillery or tanks. Exceptions were the set piece siege battles such as the battle of Khe Sanh or heavy artillery duels against US batteries across the Vietnamese Demilitarized Zone. It was only after the shift to conventional warfare in the 1972 Easter Offensive, and the final conventional campaign in 1975 (when US airpower had vacated the field) that tanks and heavy batteries were openly used in significant numbers. When using heavy artillery, the VC/PAVN relied on high quality Soviet-supplied heavy 122mm and 130mm guns that outranged American and ARVN opposition.

== VC/PAVN logistics ==
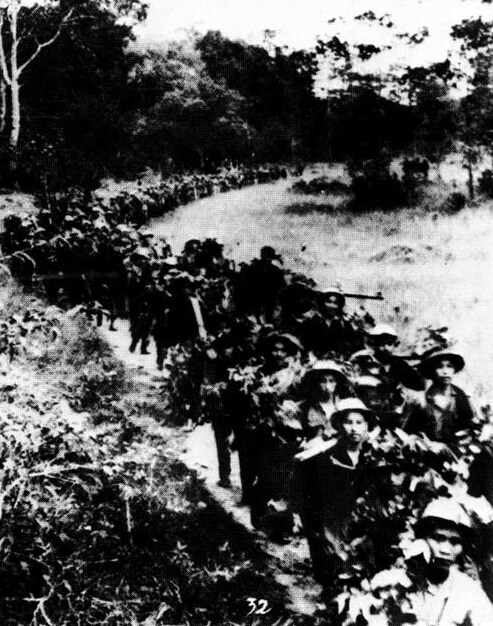
NVA troops – Laos 1967

=== Austerity of communist force requirements ===
VC/PAVN logistics were marked by austerity, but sufficient supplies, equipment and material were on hand to furnish final victory. Consumption levels were much less than those of their American/ARVN opponents. It is estimated that a VC/PAVN division in the south typically required only 15 tons of supplies per day. Total requirements to run the insurgency in the south were relatively small compared to the needs of US opponents, well below port and rail capacity. One US intelligence estimate puts external communist supply requirements for Communist forces in South Vietnam at approximately 100 tons per day- 15 tons via the DMZ, 35 tons from Cambodia and 50 tons from Laos.

In 1968 with the Tet Offensive and other major operations, these numbers surged but still weighed in at a modest daily 120 tons. By contrast a single US heavy combat division required about 5 times this amount. The problem was not the total incoming quantity but moving material down the Ho Chi Minh Trail and other transmission paths, to the point of battle operations. Soviet bloc and Chinese shipments easily met ordinary communist force requirements. Internal supply from within South Vietnam was also crucial, particularly food supplies.

=== Support by the Soviet bloc and China ===
Communist bloc support was vital for prosecution of the war in the South. North Vietnam had relatively little industrial base. The gap was filled primarily by China and Russia. The Soviet Union was the largest supplier of war aid, furnishing most fuel, munitions, and heavy equipment, including advanced air defense systems. China made significant contributions in medicines, hospital care, training facilities, foodstuffs, and infantry weapons.

Since China bordered Vietnam, it was an immensely important conduit of material on land, although the Soviets also delivered some of its aid by sea. Soviet aid outstripped that of China, averaging over half a billion dollars per year in the later stages of the war, with some $700 million in 1967 alone. China provided an estimated $150 million to $200 million annually, along with such in-kind aid as the deployment of thousands of troops in road and railway construction in the border provinces. China also provided radar stations and airfields where Vietnam People's Air Force aircraft could marshal for attack, or flee to when in trouble against American air forces. These military airbases were off-limits to American retaliation.

The railway network in the Chinese provinces bordering North Vietnam was of vital importance in importing war material. American rules of engagement forbid strikes against this network for fear of provoking Chinese intervention. Thousands of Chinese troops (the PLA's 1st and 2nd Divisions) made important contributions to Hanoi's war effort- building or repairing hundreds of miles of track and numerous other facilities such as bridges, tunnels, stations and marshaling yards. Chinese troops also built bunkers and other fortifications, and manned dozens of anti-aircraft batteries. In all, some 320,000 Chinese soldiers served in Vietnam during the war.

=== The Ho Chi Minh and Sihanouk Trails ===
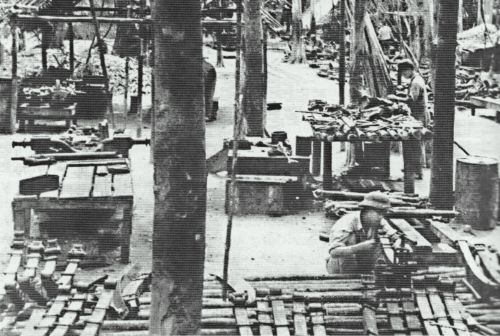
A binh tram in operation on the Ho Chi Minh Trail

==== The Ho Chi Minh Trail ====
Construction of what was to become the famous Ho Chi Minh Trail extended over decades, with elements put in place during the anti-French struggle of the Viet Minh. Known to the North Vietnamese as the Truong Son Strategic Supply Route, the Central Committee of the Lao Dong Party ordered construction of routes for infiltration as early as 1959, under the 559 Transport Group. The Trail was a complex web of roads, tracks, bypasses, waterways, depots, and marshaling areas, some 12,000 miles (19,000 km) in total. It snaked through parts of North Vietnam, Laos and Cambodia. US policymakers made ground attack against Trail networks in these countries off limits, (until limited operations were permitted late in the War) and North Vietnamese forces took full advantage of this to move massive quantities of men and material into South Vietnam to attack US and ARVN troops. As the war progressed, the North Vietnamese expanded and improved the Trail, moving material by truck, installing missile batteries for air defense and laying fuel pipelines. Air interdiction of the Trail hurt supply efforts but failed to stop the logistical buildup on a sustained basis.

The Trail had over 20 major way-stations operated by dedicated logistics units or Binh Trams, responsible for air and land defence, and delivery of supplies and replacements to fighting points in the South. Commo-Liaison units also operated along other trail segments and were tasked with providing food, shelter, medical support and guides to infiltrating troops between Trail segments. The Binh Trams were responsible for numerous functions in the sector of the Trail it controlled- including subordinate camps and way-stations, the care and feeding of troops, road repair, anti-aircraft defenses, vehicle repair and maintenance, and medical care. Each binh tram had its own force of porters, guides, engineers, specialists, transportation units and infantry. Some binh trams had extensive anti-aircraft defenses. The Mu Gia binh tram area for example, was estimated to have no fewer than 302 anti-aircraft positions as early as 1966, a deadly flak trap for US aircraft. By 1973, gun batteries had been supplemented with Soviet-supplied surface to air missiles on various parts of the Trail.

==== Sihanouk Trail in Cambodia ====
The Sihanouk Trail was the American name for the network of roads, waterways and paths cutting through Cambodia that supplied communist forces. This network was considered an integral part of the overall supply system incorporating Laos and North Vietnam and centered around the Cambodian port of Kompong Somor Sihanoukville. The unit tasked by Hanoi with organizing movement was the 470th Transport Group, which established a similar network on binh trams and way-stations.

... military supplies were sailed directly from North Vietnam on communist-flagged (especially of the Eastern bloc) ships to the Cambodian port of Sihanoukville, where that nation's neutrality guaranteed their delivery. The supplies were unloaded and then transferred to trucks which transported them to the frontier zones that served as PAVN/NLF Base Areas.[8] These Base Areas also served as sanctuaries for PAVN/NLF troops, who simply crossed the border from South Vietnam, rested, reinforced, and refitted for their next campaign in safety.

Of the Sihanouk Trail and Cambodia, one American military history says:

The continuity in the infiltration corridor through Cambodia and Laos mitigated against the forces being stopped. Unlike Greece, fifteen years earlier, which had been able to seal its borders with the help of neighbors, South Vietnam could not count on such aid. Cambodia's port of Sihanoukville made possible the flooding of the South Vietnam battlefield with a family of Sino-Soviet equipment that was completely compatible with that used by VC/NVA forces in the rest of Vietnam. The overthrow of Sihanouk and the closing of the Sihanoukville port in early 1970 were too little too late. Laos was still a wide-open corridor, and U.S. forces were withdrawing. It was never a question of victory for the North, it was only a matter of time.

==== Effectiveness of the Trail despite interdiction efforts ====
By 1969 the Ho Chi Minh Trail was a sophisticated logistical web with paved roads, truck parks, maintenance and supply depots, and well organized and defended terminuses and bases, moving thousands of men per month into the battle zone. A fuel pipeline complete with pumping stations was even in place by 1969, and this was to multiply, together with other installations such as missile batteries, as the conflict extended. The need for massive amounts of manual labor for construction actually decreased on the Trail as heavy equipment like bulldozers and rock crushers were deployed, and both miles of road built and truck traffic expanded. By the war's end almost a million soldiers had made the trip down the Trail and tens of thousands of tons were being transported annually.

A massive American effort in the air failed to stop the men and material pushed forward by Hanoi. Bomb tonnages dropped on the Trail in Laos offer some indication of the scale of the American campaign: 1969– 433,000 tons, 1970– 394,000 tons (74,147 sorties), 1971– 402,000 tons (69,000 sorties). However, with only about 100 tons a day required, PAVN could keep its troops supplied indefinitely. Amounts ten times or more this size however, were entering the top of the logistical pipeline before trickling down into South Vietnam, Laos and adjoining border regions. With volumes such as these, backed by lavish Soviet and Chinese aid, and thorough organization, PAVN persevered until final victory.

=== Logistical organization and facilities ===
==== Supply from inside South Vietnam ====
Simplified overview of communist logistics, including Soviet and Chinese aid, internal VC logistical organization inside the South, and the Ho Chi Minh Trail.

While outside material was vital to the war effort, much of the resources needed were obtained inside South Vietnam. Tonnages needed for communist forces were modest for the low-intensity protracted war style. One Central Intelligence Agency study in 1966 found that the bulk of supplies needed were generated within South Vietnam. Food was always had locally, taxed away from peasants, purchased or even grown by VC units. Captured stocks were also exploited. American logistical largesse also provided a bonanza as fraud and corruption siphoned off resources. Both weapons and food for example were readily available on the black markets of South Vietnam.

This capability of generating resources internally contributed to the mixed results obtained by massive US interdiction efforts- such as the bombing campaign in Laos. Big search and destroy operations seized hundreds of tons of rice and other material in remoter base areas, but these could be regenerated and restocked again when roving US troops invariably moved on to their next sweep. The Ho Chi Minh Trail consumed massive amounts of attention, but the internal pipelines were also crucial, and these were not closed off because the US and particularly the South Vietnamese Government failed to control the major population concentrations effectively.

==== North-South organization ====
PAVN headquarters in Hanoi was responsible for the coordinating the North to South logistical effort. To this end, it deployed 3 special formations.

- The 603rd Transport Battalion handled sea infiltration and supply movement.
- The 500th Transport Group handled movement of troops and supplies in the North in preparation for the journey south
- The 559th Transport Group was the biggest of the three, numbering an estimated 50,000 troops with 100,000 civilian porters in support. It handled all storage, movement, anti-aircraft defense and fortification on the Ho Chi Minh Trail which snaked through parts of Laos and Cambodia.
- The 470th Transport group was established to move material from Cambodia

==== Logistical organization inside South Vietnam ====
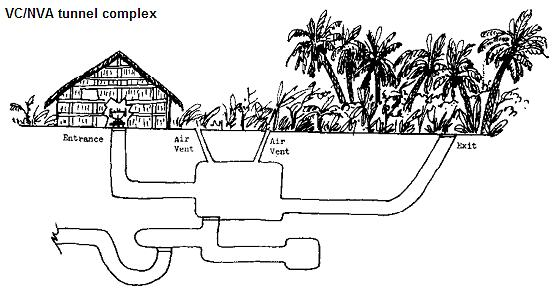
Ingenious VC/NVA tunnel complex, used for storage, shelter, withdrawal and defence

Within SVN, the PAVN/VC military HQ, COVSN, had responsibility for overall logistical coordination. This changed as the war went on, and the PAVN took over more responsibility in-country after the 1968 Tet offensive. This takeover involved setting up new headquarters and replacing fallen VC with PAVN regulars. Within the southern logistical organization, 3 agencies were responsible. Sub-sections of these operated at different levels, from Interzone to village.

- The Finance and Economic grouping was the chief fund raiser, banker and purchasing agent.
- The Rear Services grouping provided logistical support for military operations, such as digging bunkers or hauling supplies.
- The Forward Supply Council marshaled the money and resources raised by the Finance section, and the services of the rear Group. It controlled civilian labor recruitment, and military recruitment including drafting men into the VC, among other things. Party membership was strongest in the Forward Supply Council.

==== Overlap and duplication ====
There was a significant overlap of logistical functions in the communist organization, as the PAVN and the VC civilian agencies worked an area. However overall control was always in the hands of party cadres at all levels, from province down to village. Duplication also produced a wider range of alternative sources for supplies, and made the whole structure more resilient. An American or ARVN sweep for example that wiped out several supply caches did not shut down the whole district. Supply routes using multiple sources, (waterways, black-market transactions, cross-border sanctuaries, etc.) could be reopened, and laborers from other regions could be shifted into reconstruction work once the Americans or ARVN left (as they usually did).

==== Civilian porters ====
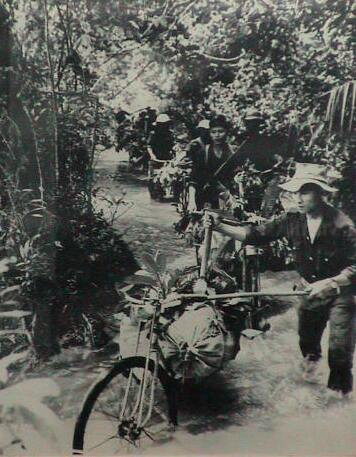
Thousands of porters provided slow but effective logistical support for VC/PAVN operations. Note use of bicycles which allowed up to 400 lb (180 kg) to be hauled per bike.

Civilian labor was crucial to VC/PAVN success, and was deployed in building fortifications, transporting supplies and equipment, prepositioning material in readiness for an operation, and general construction such as road repair. Labor was recruited primarily by impressment/draft, or as a way to pay off VC taxes, although volunteers motivated by ideology also took part. Twelve to sixteen hours of work per day were expected of laborers. Civilians undertook various pledges as directed by the regime (the "three readies", the "three responsibilities" among others,) as part of a high mobilization of the population for total war in the North and areas controlled by the VC/PAVN in the South.

Load bearing by porters was greatly enhanced by the use of ingenious "steel horses" – bicycles specially modified by widening the handlebars, strengthening the suspensions and adding cargo pallets. Guided by two men, the specially modified bikes could move 300–400 pounds, several times that of a single porter. Older men made up many of the long-term laborers as those younger were drawn off into combat and female labor was used extensively in a wide range of logistics tasks.

==== Port and water transport facilities ====
Communist forces also made extensive use of Vietnam's large network of rivers and waterways, drawing heavily on the Cambodian port of Sihanoukville, which was also off-limits to American attack. Some 80% of the non-food supplies used by the VC/PAVN in the southern half of South Vietnam moved through Sihanoukville.

Some port areas of North Vietnam were also vital to the logistical effort, as were ships by socialist nations that fed the continual stream of war material. Attacks on these were also forbidden by American policymakers. Until late in the War, American pilots, hindered by their government's rules of engagement, could only watch helplessly as munitions, heavy weapons and advanced components like SAM missile batteries were unloaded at such harbors as Haiphong. By 1966, some 130 SAM batteries were in North Vietnam by US estimates, manned primarily by Russian crews.

==== Weapons resupply and communications ====
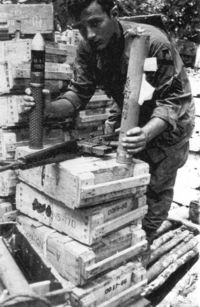
US soldier with captured arms- Cambodia, 1970. Such efforts slowed but could not stop the flow of material from outside sources, nor the crucial supplies generated within SVN by Communist forces

VC/PAVN weapons had to be moved from shipment points in the North, Cambodia or down the Ho Chi Minh Trail. Small, jungle workshops produced simpler types of ordnance such as reloaded rifle cartridges and grenades. A large number of small supply depots, widely dispersed to guard against attack, furnished units on the move. Impressed labor groups of civilians also hauled ammo and supplies for the Front. ARVN and US sources were also significant localized conduits of arms. VC fighters in some areas ironically treasured the American M16 rifle despite its sometimes quirky performance, for the wide availability of both the weapon and its ammunition on the black market or through purchase from corrupt ARVN soldiers, or through the careless handling and loss of magazines by US troops.

VC/PAVN formations suffered a shortage of modern radios. Although wire was sometimes run for field telephones in selected operations, they relied heavily on couriers for transmission of messages on the battlefield. A "dead drop" system for couriers was also extensively used for intelligence communications. The whole network was segmented, so that one part did not know the other branches. A courier might leave a message at a specific drop location for another courier (a stranger to him or her). This segmentation helped protect against compromising the network when couriers were captured or killed. Segmentation enhanced security and was also sometimes used in moving troops – with guide units only knowing their section of the trail or transport network.

==== Food and medical care ====
Food. The bulk of VC/PAVN foodstuffs was procured within South Vietnam via purchase, taxation on peasants in controlled areas, and personal farming by troops in remote areas. Households in areas under VC control were required to keep a certain minimum supply of rice on hand, and a large number of secret caches and supply dumps honeycombed the countryside. Food, along with almost any other item, was also obtained on Saigon's thriving black market. This included large quantities of American food aid to South Vietnam, a phenomenon sometimes observed by US troops that found enemy supply caches. Ironically, even the remnants of American airstrikes were pressed into food production. US patrols encountered numerous B-52 bomb craters used as fish and duck ponds by PAVN/VC troops.

Medical care. Medical supplies used on the battlefield came from several sources, including Soviet bloc and Chinese shipments and humanitarian donations earmarked for civilian use from neutral countries, including Scandinavian nations. Medical care like other aspects of the logistical system was austere, and field hospitals, whether in caves, underground bunkers or jungle huts usually suffered shortages. A one-day supply of medicines was usually kept on hand, with the rest hidden off-site until needed. About 7% of a typical VC/PAVN division's manpower was made up of medical personnel.

== The struggle against US bombing ==
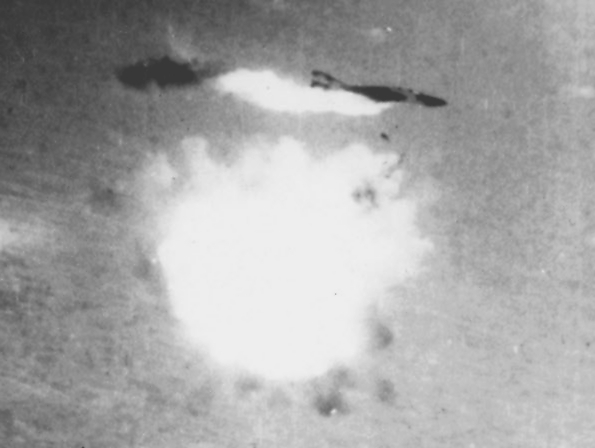
F-4 Phantom II aircraft burns after being hit by a surface-to-air missile. By 1968, the North had one of the densest air defenses in the world

=== Comparison of the contenders ===
As one of the world's foremost military powers, the US could bring a massive variety of sophisticated aerial technology to bear on the communist side, ranging from heavy B-52 bombers, to carrier-based striking forces, to precision munitions. Throughout most of the conflict the US generally enjoyed air superiority, although this was often challenged in the north by MiG fighters and especially modern Soviet surface-to-air missiles. Primarily an agrarian country with little industrial and technical base, North Vietnam compared poorly with the advanced material and technical systems of its American opponent, and often invoked a David versus Goliath comparison in its propaganda campaigns. However, Communist forces had several important advantages that translated into successful tactics to survive American bombing:

- American war makers ran a restrained start-stop aerial campaign for fear of Chinese or Soviet intervention – exempting MiG airfields in China, targets above certain geographical or navigational boundaries, and many dams and locks associated with North Vietnam's agricultural system,
- PAVN possessed privileged enclaves in Laos and Cambodia, immune from ground attack – creating vital sanctuaries and strategic depth,
- Friendly socialist allies that provided a massive pipeline of war material – off-limits to US strikes until it had entered North Vietnam, including the vital border with an unassailable China
- Heavy tropical vegetation and periods of poor weather in the battle zone, that facilitated the movement of men and material and hindered aerial attacks
- The ability for ruthless total mobilization of almost the entire population, for as long as the struggle required.

=== The aerial onslaught ===
From 1965 to 1968, North Vietnam was bombed on a scale heavier than that of the entire Pacific theater during World War II, and absorbed about 20% of US bombing efforts in Southeast Asia. Targeting however was tightly controlled and limited, and while most major industrial centers had been destroyed by 1967, imports from Soviet bloc countries and China furnished most war-making material. The country continued to function for war despite the aerial onslaught. The American bombing campaign was geared towards attrition, wearing down the will of the Communist North to fight. As one historian notes "Knowing that the Vietnamese could replace their losses indefinitely, and were doing so, the American war planners counted on the psychological wear and tear of modern air-power upon a land-bound adversary. McNamara pictured enemy soldiers under combined assault in the South, utterly devoid of flying machines for mobility or retaliation in the sky.. 'They only thing that will prevent it [stalemate] Mr. President, is their morale breaking...' he said... 'that's the only chance we have of winning this thing... because we are just not killing enough of them to make it impossible for the North to continue to fight."

The North Vietnamese however kept fighting. The initial American Operation Rolling Thunder campaign while inflicting painful local damage, did not halt the continual stream of men and materiel into the south. Rolling Thunder imposed several limitations on US operations, and allowed Soviet and Chinese ships freedom to continuously deliver munitions and supplies into the battle zone. American bombing was sometimes ineffective against both the landscape and determined repair attempts. A massive 1966 bombing mission by thirty B-52's for example attempted to pulverize vital stretches of the strategic Mu Gia Pass. Two days later however the traffic was moving again, despite huge landslides caused by the bombing, and the use of numerous delayed action munitions. On the vital China to Hanoi corridor, most major bridges, roads and rail lines were back in operation within five weeks after the American bombing halt in 1968. The large number of waterways in Vietnam were also put to good use in moving materiel.

The Nixon administration, looking for a way out, pursued a less restrained course under Operation Linebacker launched in response to the PAVN's 1972 Easter Offensive and Operation Linebacker II. These attacks removed many of the restrictions upon previous American targeting, seeded Northern waters with mines that cut Soviet and Chinese imports to a trickle, exhausted national air-defenses and crippled whatever significant remaining industrial plant and transportation network was left in the North. Linebacker caused more damage to Northern lines of communication, than the previous 3 years of Rolling Thunder, particularly as the Easter Offensive brought PAVN forces out into the open.

Distinct restrictions were still applied however. Critics of the US effort charged that it was deliberately targeting civilians, but while several instances of collateral damage did occur, US policy and practice was concentrated on strategic military targets not the elimination of civilians. The Nixon regime forbade the bombing of dams and dikes for example, along with POW camps, hospitals and religious shrines. Precision munitions aided this mandate. For example, US F-4 aircraft destroyed power generators at the Lang Chi Hydroelectric Plant during Linebacker I, but left its dam 50 feet (15 m) away untouched to minimize civilian collateral damage.

The successful and severely damaging American Linebacker efforts however were not sustained. By the time of the aerial offensives, most US forces (over 500,000 troops) were already out of the Vietnam theater. Over 150,000 Northern soldiers however remained in the South after the 1972 Offensive, expanding the conquered zone, building up logistics capacity (including the construction and extension of pipelines) and biding their time, until the final Ho Chi Minh Campaign in 1975.

=== Personnel mobilization for the struggle ===
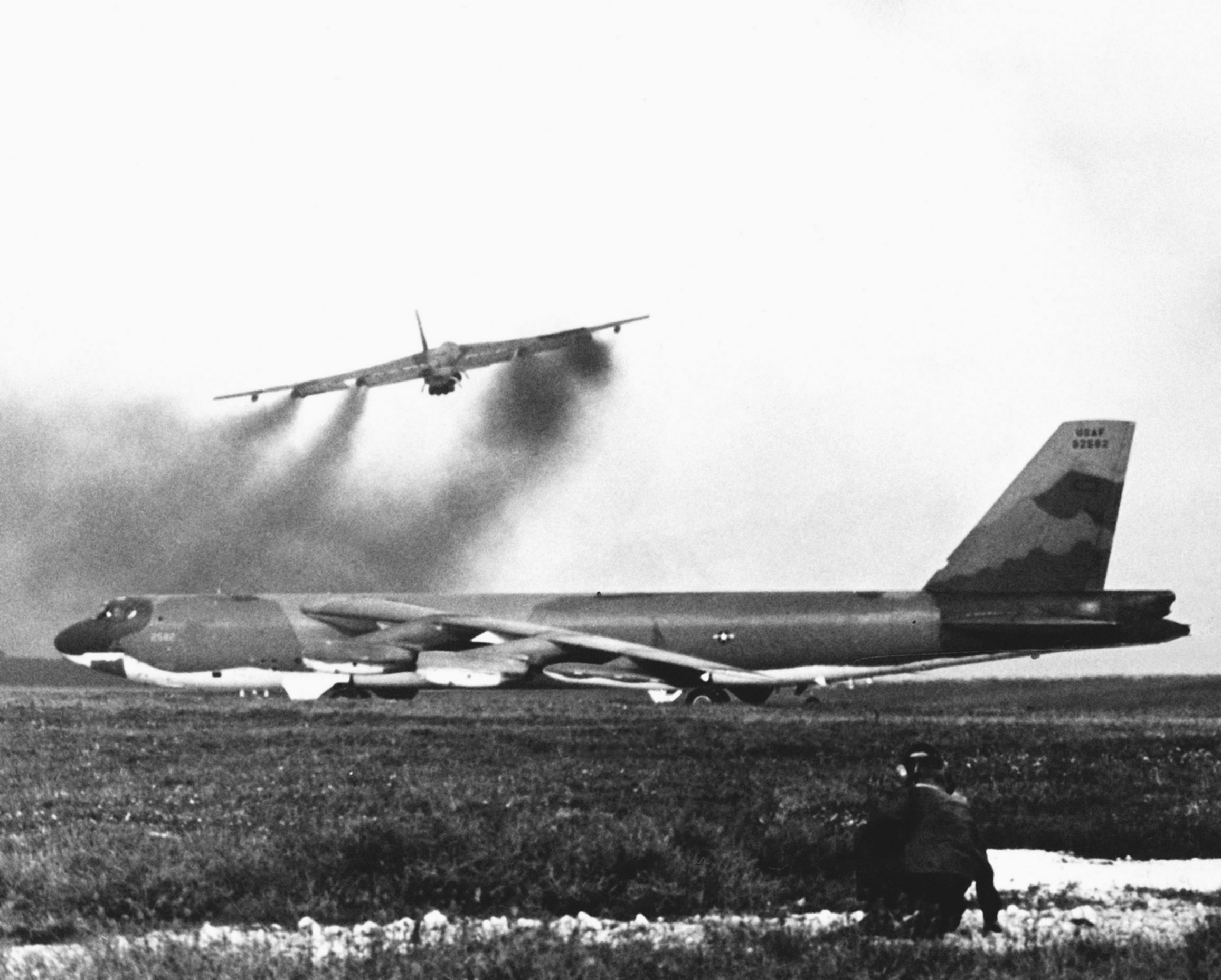
American B-52 bombers made devastating strikes during the Linebacker operations in 1972, but the US was already concluding its involvement in Vietnam that year. Over 1,800 aircraft (including 31 of the heavy bombers) were downed in combat by North Vietnamese anti-aircraft defenses during the war.

Northern leader Le Duan chose to defy US airpower, arguing that though Hanoi, Haiphong or other cities were destroyed, the Vietnamese people would not be intimidated, and called for a massive war mobilization of reserves. American bombers caused substantial damage to Northern road and rail infrastructure, including bridges, culverts, depots, ports and docks. Nevertheless, an enormous effort kept transportation networks open. Some 500,000 workers were mobilized to repair bomb damage as needed, with an additional 100,000 constantly at work. The largest repair organization was the Youth Shock Brigades Against the Americans for National Salvation. Numbering some 50,000 to 70,000 laborers, the brigades were made up of recruits between 15 and 30, with heavy female representation as young men were siphoned off for combat. Joined by assorted militia and self-defense forces, these quick-reaction units were often stationed along heavily bombed routes and deployed to repair bridges, roads, tracks, tunnels and other structures. Pre-positioning of these groups allowed them to spring rapidly into action after an attack had passed.

Female representation was substantial. Beyond male troops, approximately 1.5 million Northern women were mustered into support and even some combat units, both on the northern home front and further south on the Trail. A female fighter, Ngo Thi Tuyen', was hailed as a model of patriotic resistance and devotion for heroic repair efforts to the important Thanh Hóa Bridge, a structure that stood up against several attempts to destroy it, until laser-guided bombs knocked it down in 1972. The party sponsored competitive essays among the girls, with selected winners volunteering to join special "dare to die" unexploded bomb squads. Some 170,000 girls were also mobilized into emergency youth troops, marching south to provide support on the Ho Chi Minh Trail, equipped with shovels and supplies. One historian asserts:

By 1975, the emergency troops had shepherded war material south and an estimated 700,000 wounded soldiers back to North Vietnam, while helping air defenders bring down some 8,558 U.S. aircraft lost in Southeast Asia. Women survivors, who often would be left sterile, disfigured, and bitterly alone in a society that treasured the extended family, adapted to the unspeakable carnage in war.

Another history notes that while female home front activity in war (clearing rubble, manning factories, nursing the sick etc.) is familiar to Westerners, less is known about the tens of thousands of teenage girls and young women (ages 13 to 22) sent south:

the young women warriors Hanoi sent to fight and die along the Ho Chí Minh Trail struggled daily not only with American bombs but also with hunger, disease, sexual abuse, and death. Female brigadiers, many of whom were scarcely teenagers when they were sent down the Trail, suffered from inadequate training, shelter, and clothing, and from chronic shortages of food and medicine. Many of those who survived their time on the battlefield continue to suffer from wounds, illnesses, and social neglect decades after the war had ended.

=== Evasion, concealment and repair methods ===
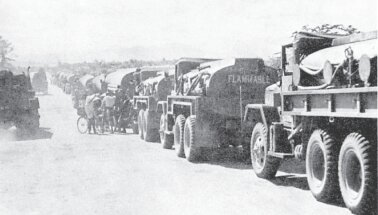
PAVN trucks ready to roll- 1972. Communist forces sometimes exploited US Rules of engagement, massing convoys in the 25-mile (40 km) buffer zone near the Chinese border- off-limits of US airstrikes

Dispersal of assets and pre-positioning of material. The hub of the North Vietnamese material distribution was Hanoi with its numerous railheads, bridges and major roads. Much of Hanoi however, along with other key port areas such as Haiphong, were off-limits to US air attack until late in the American war. During the bombing campaign over the north, facilities and installations were widely dispersed and concealed. Some 2,000 imported generators provided essential power, and oil and gas were shuttled ashore on small craft from Soviet ships and stored in thousands of small 55-gallon drums throughout the countryside, alongside roads and in rice paddies. A massive number of civilians were also evacuated to the countryside from the urban areas, along with factories and machine shops. Population was also dispersed with massive movement of civilians out of major cities like Hanoi, into the countryside. Prepositioning was essential to PAVN tactics. Every few miles stockpiles of tools and material were positioned, both on the Ho Chi Minh Trail and on key transportation routes within North Vietnam. Ready-reaction labor units were also held in various areas, deploying for action to repair bomb damage. Action units sometimes helped with supply movement, such as floating 55-gallon drums of fuel down waterways – a crude yet sometimes effective method of moving such material in bulk. Soviet ships also aided dispersal by bringing in fuel and other material already pre-packed in drums, offloaded on to barges for quick distribution, with the ships themselves off-limits to US air attack.

Road and bridge repair methods. There were several ways to keep traffic moving amid the destruction wrought by the bombers. Simple pontoon bridges were made of lashed together bundles of bamboo, topped by heavy wooden planking. Sturdier pontoon structures were made by tying wooden canal boats together – with camouflage measures to hide them during the day from aerial observation. Bridges were also built underwater to escape detection. As noted above, supplies, equipment and material was pre-stocked along roads, and near various choke points like ferry crossings so that repairs could be made quickly. Delayed action bombs caused special problems. Designated personnel were tasked with dismantling them, or watchmen kept them under observation- signaling all within blast distance to disperse when the bombs showed signs of detonating. Repairs were often done at night when the enemy aircraft would be less active.

Concealment and evasion. Camouflage was used heavily. Roads were sometimes "roofed" with a network of branches, brush and other greenery, and vehicles on the roads sported foliage to aid in concealment. Night movement was almost constant, with drivers being guided on the roads by white poles painted by the Youth Shock Brigades, or personnel dressed in white. Truck headlights were sometimes mounted under the vehicle to help escape detection from the air. Truck driving was a dangerous task, and drivers were expected to not only dodge aircraft but help with vehicle and road repairs. Traffic was regulated by numerous civilian helpers, often young girls. In the air defense effort around important targets, labor units often constructed up to 4 dummy positions for each real anti-aircraft concentration.

=== Exploitation of US Rules of Engagement ===
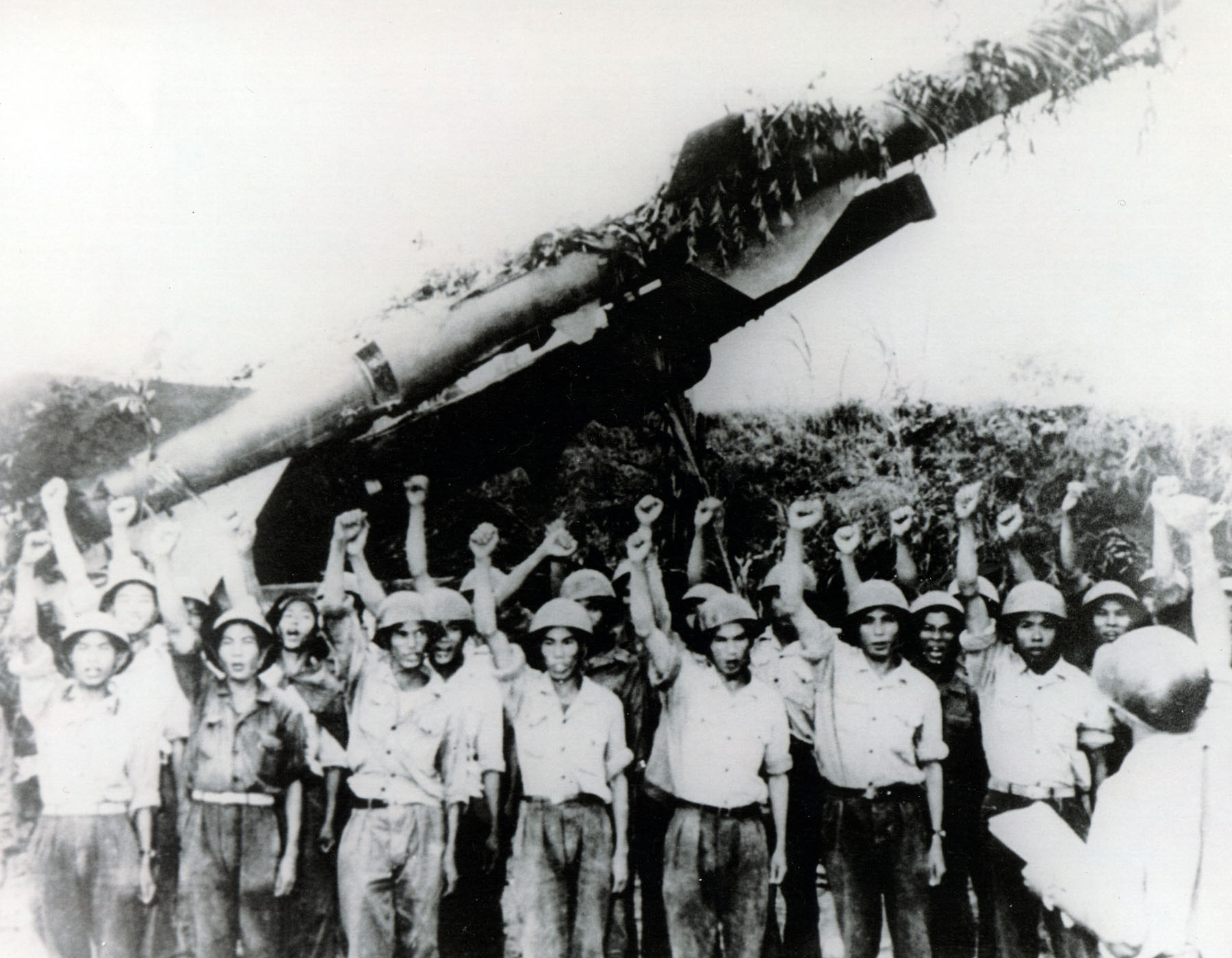
Crew of North Vietnamese SA-2 missile site, deploying some of the most advanced missile technology of the era. In the war's early years, US policymakers refused to hit some sites under construction for fear of Soviet or Chinese reactions. Some of the exempted missile batteries were to later shoot down US aircraft.

Fear of massive Chinese intervention in Vietnam continually caused a number of restrictions on US options. These constraints implicitly granted North Vietnam's continued existence, and sought to avoid antagonizing Peking by attacking targets too close to the Chinese border with North Vietnam, or within China itself. The Chinese were content to provide supportive diplomatic rhetoric, manpower and material, but signaled they would not enter the fray unless the Americans invaded North Vietnam. The Nixon regime removed some of the operational constraints on American power late in the war, but was already committed to removing US forces from the theater, and the punishment inflicted by expanded bombing, while heavy, did not fundamentally threaten Hanoi's existence. Nor did it stop China from continuing to massively supply its North Vietnamese client. The North Vietnamese were quick to take advantage of the leverage afforded under both Johnson and Nixon. When a 25-mile (40 km) buffer zone policy was in effect near the Chinese border for example, US reconnaissance planes could see hundreds of loaded trucks massed in the buffer zone during the day, waiting to roll later at night.

Exploitation and deception were also used in air defense operations. In early 1965 for example, the Johnson Administration refused to hit SA-2 missile sites before they became operational against US aircraft, despite the urging of the Joint Chiefs of Staff that the price of postponement would be paid for in pilot lives and aircraft losses. Defense secretary McNamara initially opposed striking the missile batteries because he feared killing Chinese or Soviet technicians working at the sites. North Vietnam was allowed almost four months to complete preparations and 13 days after an 11 July press conference in which a US spokesman said there were "no plans at this time" to attack the missile threat, Hanoi's SAM batteries downed an Air Force F-4C Phantom and its 2-man crew- one survivor spending eight years in a POW camp. Other missile salvos damaged accompanying aircraft. A limited strike was authorized three days later in retaliation. This delay allowed PAVN defenders time to reinforce the sites with additional anti-aircraft guns, which damaged several US aircraft and shot down six. Subsequent US analysis indicated skillful movement and dispersal by the North Vietnamese, with one of the missile sites a decoy, and another left empty – deployed as bait to lure the American pilots to their doom.

=== Resilience of the PAVN logistics effort ===
One 1972 analysis for the US Senate on bombing notes the tenacity and resilience of PAVN and its logistics system:

Throughout the war, the results of the bombing of North Vietnam have consistently fallen far short of the claims made for it. The bombing began with the expectation that it would break the will of the enemy—although many questioned its capability to do so. When Hanoi showed no signs of weakening, the rationale shifted toward interdiction, but this goal, too, proved unobtainable. Many suggested that this failure was because there were too many restrictions. If such targets as the North's petroleum facilities were attacked, it was argued, Hanoi's capabilities would be sharply reduced. But again North Vietnam proved capable of adapting; the will of the Hanoi leadership held strong. Again bombing failed to fulfill the promises made for it.

== The infiltration south ==
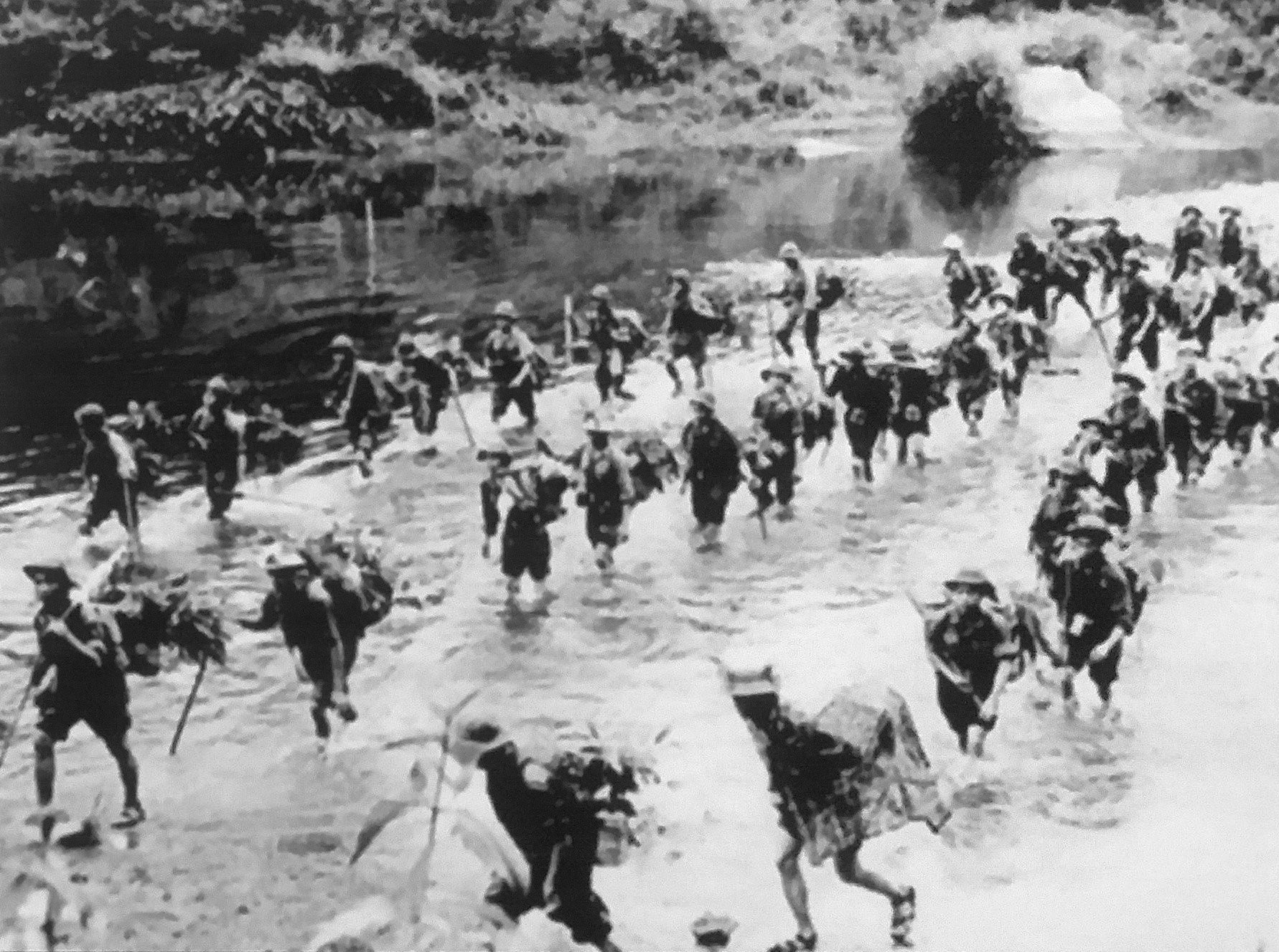
Infiltrators on the move in Laos down the Ho Chi Minh Trail

=== Trail movement and hardships ===
Routes south. PAVN units deemed ready for infiltration were transported from the training centers by train or truck to the coast, at places like Dong Hoi, where they received additional rations. From there they marched south and southwest, towards the DMZ or Laos, using a variety of routes. Movement was at night to avoid American air attacks. Within the DMZ, there was a rest pause of several days as infiltrators staged for the crossing. Moving in company or battalion sizes, units departed at two-day intervals, with most crossing into Laos along the Ho Chi Minh Trail. PAVN infiltration routes were keyed to the military regions the infiltrators were assigned to. PAVN units headed for the Trị-Thiên region closest to the northern border might infiltrate directly across the DMZ. Those headed further beyond might travel through Laos. The Sihanouk Trail in Cambodia was opened in 1966 to enable PAVN to infiltrate and resupply COVSN in the southernmost zone of South Vietnam.

The hardships of the Trail were many. Casualties caused by American airstrikes were low, accounting for only 2% of total losses. More dangerous enemies included malaria, foot infections and a variety of other maladies. Total losses to disease are estimated at 10 to 20%. Sick soldiers were left to recuperate at various way-stations. Transit time could take months, and sometimes entire units were disrupted and disbanded. Recruits were generally given an optimistic picture of conditions in the south, with claims that victory was close at hand and that they would be welcomed as liberators by their oppressed southern brethren. They were often quickly disabused of such notions as they encountered sullen peasants and withering US firepower.

Movement techniques. The Trail covered a wide diversity of rough terrain. Steep mountain slopes had steps gouged into them for climbing. Ravines were bridged with crude bamboo suspension bridges. Ferries shuttled troops across rivers and streams. Large gangs of civilian laborers were drafted to keep the network functioning. Binh Trams stations at intervals on the Trail, hosted the stream of men, weapons and supplies flowing to the battle zone. Most material movement in bulk was not by gangs of sweating laborers, but modern Soviet-supplied trucks. Vehicles rolled on a "relay" basis, moving mostly at night to avoid American air power, and the trail was plentifully supplied by jungle-like camouflage at all times. Way stations were generally within one day's travel from each other. Trucks arriving at a station were unloaded, and the cargo shifted to new trucks, which carried out the next segment of the journey. Having plenty of both time and manpower, this "relay" method economized on wear and tear upon the valuable trucks, and maximized hiding opportunities from prowling US aircraft. The method also spread out available cargoes over time and space, enabling the entire network to better bear losses from such deadly enemies as the American C-130 Gunship, and such technologies as movement sensors.

Another technique used to lower casualties and loss was to separate the movement of men from the movement of material. PAVN soldiers were limited to old pathways, while trucks were increasingly routed along newer, improved stretches of road. Since most of the US effort focused on trucks, the bulk of the fighting men were able to travel without the full weight of US pressure, although they sometimes came under attack.

A daily march cycle might begin at 4:00am with a pause around noon, and continuation until dusk-6:00pm. Generally there was ten minutes of rest per hour, with one day of rest every five. Fifteen to twenty-five kilometers were covered daily depending on the terrain. Movement was in column, with point and rear elements. Armed liaison agents, who knew only their section of the Trail, led each infiltrating group between way-stations. Way-stations were located deep in the forest, and contained caches of supplies for use by the infiltrators. They were guarded by detachments of the 559th Transport Group. Sometimes the troops camped on the Trail itself between stations.

==== Techniques to deceive or fight US airpower and technology ====
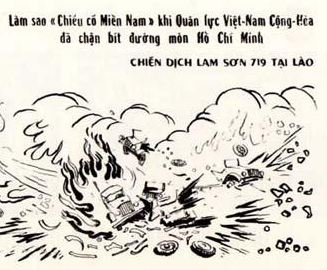
US propaganda leaflet dropped on the Ho Chi Minh Trail warning of doom for NVA trucks and supplies

Camouflage and concealment. By 1968, activity was brisk on the Trail. Ten thousand trucks could move at a time, and improvements were made continuously by the 559th Transport Group. US air interdiction against the Trail increased as PAVN stepped up its activities. As noted above, the risk of air attack caused men and material to move along linked, but separate routes, and truck loading operated in shuttle fashion. The sheer volumes moving down the trail however meant that the PAVN effort came under severe strain. Great pains were taken to camouflage movement. Bridges across water obstacles were often built under water, difficult to detect from the air, and multiple crossing points were developed. Wherever possible PAVN units minimized disturbances to the jungle cover, and even transplanted foliage from elsewhere to cover and conceal signs of movement. PAVN sources claim that the 559th Transport Group camouflaged some 2,000 miles (3,200 km) out of the 12,000 miles (19,000 km) of trail.

Techniques used to fool US air-power also included placing gasoline-soaked rags along the trail to fool pilots into thinking they had hit or ignited something of value. Truck lights were dimmed or mounted under vehicles, and at regular intervals on some routes, spaces were cut into the jungle trees, forming small cups into which kerosene or some other flammable liquid was poured. This was lit to provide guide lights to moving men and material, invisible from the air. Waterways were also pressed into service via use of the "floating barrel" technique- steel drums packed with supplies that floated downstream for later collection. About 100,000 people were kept working on the Trail as porters, drivers, mechanics and anti-aircraft troops. By 1970, the entire Trail bristled with anti-aircraft batteries.

Anti-sensor techniques. PAVN troops also faced US movement, auditory and chemical ("people sniffer") sensors on various parts of the Trail. One example of this was seen in Operation Igloo White, which used air-dropped acoustic and seismic sensors in Laos, linked to processing computers in Thailand. Data collated from the sensors were analyzed to predict the movement of PAVN convoys and units. Air-power then hit suspected locations. Special Operation teams were also inserted for reconnaissance and assessment, and sometimes the guidance of airstrikes on to targets. Sound/seismic sensors were countered by destroying them, moving them to useless locations, removing their batteries, playing tape recordings of truck traffic, and running herds of cattle over them. Chemical sensors were neutralized by leaving buckets of urine hanging on trees over the transportation network. Esoteric American technology- such as the Calgon brand "mud maker" compounds deployed to slow movement on the Trail were met with typical PAVN practicality. Logs and bamboo were laid over the quickly dissolving mud and the Northern fighters moved on. Special trail-watching and reaction units were also used to counter infiltration by US-MACV Special Operations teams. Local tribesmen recruited by PAVN for example would beat on pots or gongs to warn of the presence or landing of US Special Operations teams and high rewards were offered for assisting with their capture.

==== Volume of infiltration ====
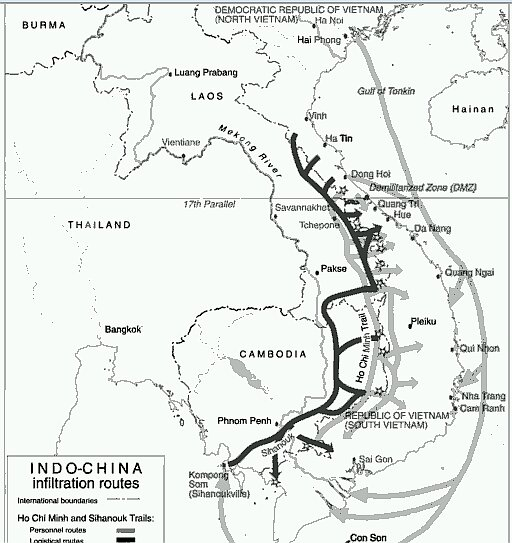
Infiltration routes into South Vietnam, including Ho Chi Minh and Shianouk Trails

VC/PAVN troop strengths during the Vietnam War are the subject of numerous controversies and contradictory claims. Official post-war North Vietnamese sources claim over half a million troops in place by 1967. US MACV estimates posited a more modest total of around 280,000. Force strengths will always be imprecise given the large number of irregular or part-time guerrilla elements.

Infiltration numbers increased yearly. In 1968 alone, some 200,000 PAVN troops made the journey south according to some American estimates. Official North Vietnamese sources also confirm the massive buildup, although figures differ between American and Northern sources. According to the official People's Army of Vietnam (PAVN) History:

In 1964 our army began to send to the battlefield complete units at their full authorized strength of personnel and equipment... By the end of 1965 our main force army in South Vietnam totaled almost 92,000... Our main force troops grew from 195,000 soldiers in early 1965 to 350,000 soldiers in May 1965 and finally to 400,000 by the end of 1965.. During 1966 the strength of our full-time forces in South Vietnam would be increased to between 270,000 and 300,000 soldiers... By the end of 1966 the total strength of our armed forces was 690,000 soldiers.

Throughout a large portion of the War, North Vietnam denied that any of its soldiers were even in the south, but it is clear that they were able to place tens of thousands of troops in the southern war zone, including complete units of regular PAVN, rather than simply individual fillers.

== Summary ==
Total war was preached from the beginning of the US intervention and a huge mobilization started as early as 1965 with population evacuation and construction of massive air defenses. In terms of stopping Hanoi's ruthless drive for reunification, the overall US bombing campaign, with its varied stops and starts, was ultimately ineffective in the face of cascading imports from socialist allies, political restraints on American action, the remorseless marshaling of the populace and the stoic endurance of the North Vietnamese. A post-war analysis by the BDM Corporation, a think-tank contractor in Vietnam, summarized the efficiency and effectiveness of VC/PAVN logistics as follows:

Subsequently the Communist Vietnamese leadership outlasted America's eight-year combat effort in Southeast Asia, and finally reunited Vietnam by force of arms. A major factor contributing to their success was the remarkable logistical support they created in an integrated network of bases, sanctuaries and lines of communication. Indeed the sanctuaries gave them the trump card that enabled them to fight a protracted war and outlast the United States commitment to the Republic of Vietnam.

== See also ==
- NLF and PAVN strategy, organization and structure
- NLF and PAVN battle tactics
- Weapons of the Vietnam War
- Vietnam War
- Guerrilla warfare
- ARVN
- Communism
- History of Vietnam
- Ho Chi Minh Trail
- Tet Offensive
- Military Assistance Command, Vietnam Studies and Observations Group
- The United States and the Vietnam War
