= Royal New Zealand Infantry Regiment Vietnam deployments 1965–1972 =

The Royal New Zealand Infantry Regiment contributed companies to the 1st Australian Task Force, deployed in Phước Tuy Province, Republic of Vietnam (South Vietnam) during the Vietnam War from 1967 to 1972.

While 1st Battalion, RNZIR remained at Terendak Camp in Malaysia, it sent a series of rifle companies to serve with the Australian Army in Vietnam. Meanwhile, the remainder of the regiment, six Territorial Force battalions, remained home in New Zealand.

== Background ==
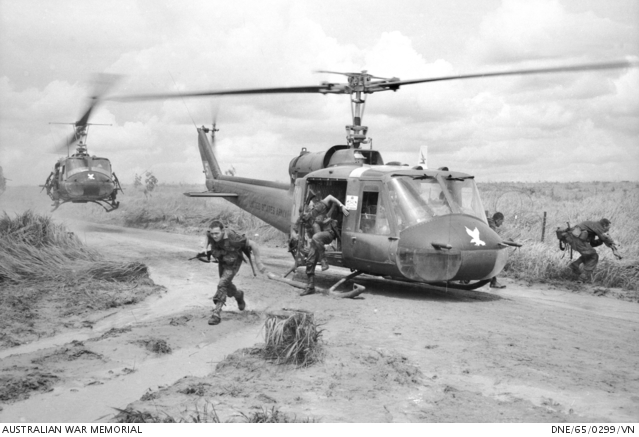
1RAR and 173rd Airborne Brigade troops deploy from U.S. UH-1s in May 1965

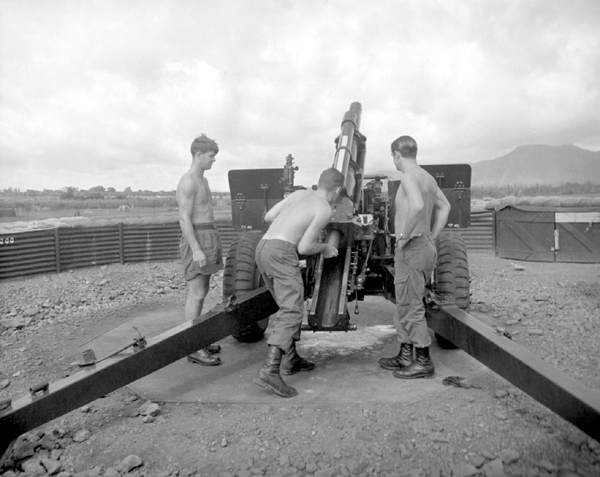
New Zealand artillery served under 173rd Airborne Brigade from 1965-1966

In May 1965 the United States government committed its 173rd Airborne Brigade to South Vietnam in a combat role. Being part of the ANZUS pact, Australia and New Zealand were asked to contribute combat forces too. Up until this time the Australians had committed an Army Training Team and New Zealand had committed some non-combatant engineers.

In response to the United States' request, the Australian government committed an infantry battalion, its 1st Battalion, Royal Australian Regiment (1 RAR), and a squadron of armoured personnel carriers in June. They joined the Americans at Bien Hoa Air Base in Biên Hòa Province, near Saigon. 1st Australian Logistic Support Group (1ALSG) was established, in support.

A headquarters for the force, Commander Australian Army Force Vietnam (COMAAFV), was established in Saigon.

New Zealand committed a battery from the Royal Regiment of New Zealand Artillery in July and established its own headquarters (HQ V Force) at Saigon.

The Australian infantry regiment and the New Zealand artillery battery served under operational control of the 173rd Airborne from the Bien Hoa Air Base. Initially, 1 RAR and 161 Bty defended the base while the paratroopers from the 173rd fought in the highlands. After two months the Australian infantry and New Zealand artillery were deployed on operations in the field.

In September the Australian government committed an Artillery battery, an engineer troop from the Royal Australian Engineers, a light aircraft unit equipped with two Cessna 180 planes and two Sioux light helicopters (161st Independent Reconnaissance Flight), 104 Signals Squadron from the Royal Australian Corps of Signals, and further logistics support personnel.

=== Formation of 1st Australian Task Force ===
Disparities in operational methods between the U.S and Australian forces were soon evident and in March 1966 the U.S and Australian governments decided to create an Australian task force with its own Tactical area of responsibility (TAOR). In May 1966 a second Australian battalion arrived, 5th Battalion, Royal Australian Regiment (5 RAR) to help establish a new permanent base at Nui Dat in Phước Tuy Province in Operation Hardihood. Phước Tuy was to be designated the TAOR for the new task force. In June 1966 the Australian and New Zealand elements were detached from the 173rd Airborne and given their new base. 1ALSG was relocated to Vũng Tàu at what would become the 1st Australian Support Compound.

1 RAR returned to Australia and was replaced by 6th Battalion, Royal Australian Regiment (6 RAR) in June.

Over the next several months the new task force at Nui Dat was brought up to strength, adding a second Australian artillery battery, an SAS Squadron, engineers from 17th Construction Squadron, intelligence elements, and Light Aid Detachments (LAD) for cavalry and artillery. Two American artillery units were also located at Nui Dat: A Battery 2/35 U.S Artillery, and 1/83 Company U.S Artillery. Eight UH-1B Iroquois helicopters from No. 9 Squadron RAAF which was based at Vung Tau Air Base provided air support for the task force. 5th Transport Company Royal Australian Army Service Corps, stationed at the newly-established 1st Australian Support Compound at Vũng Tàu provided transport logistics and mechanical engineering.

Local patrols around Nui Dat were conducted by the 1st Australian Reinforcement Unit (1ARU) and infantry platoons that were between operations. Always on standby was one infantry platoon with cavalry, mortar, tank, and air elements which together formed the ready reaction force. 1 ATF Headquarters went on to form its own Defence and Employment (D&E) Platoon which provided perimeter defence and security when 1ATF HQ had to go into the field. Eventually the D&E Platoon was utilized to conduct intelligence-gathering operations to help 1ATF planning.

=== The enemy ===
Lying on South Vietnam's southern coast, three-quarters of Phước Tuy was covered with rainforest and grassland. The South Vietnamese Government's authority over Phước Tuy was limited almost entirely to the provincial capital city of Bà Rịa. The Viet Cong controlled the majority of the province, collecting taxes and subjecting the population to extortion and violent intimidation.

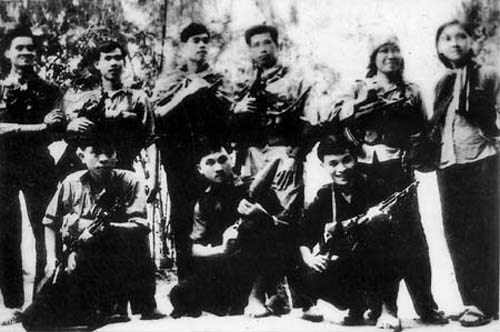
Viet Cong soldiers

The principal communist units in Phước Tuy were main forces from the 274th and 275th Regiments of the Vietcong (VC) 5th Division headquartered in the Mây Tào Mountains at the very north east of the province. Operating in Phước Tuy, Biên Hòa and Long Khánh Provinces the 5th Division comprised both local VC guerrillas and North Vietnamese People's Army of Vietnam (PAVN) Regular forces. The 274th Regiment was the stronger and better trained of the two, based in north-west Phước Tuy in an area known as the Hat Dich secret zone, with three battalions numbering 2,000 men. The 275th Regiment was based in the Mây Tào Mountains in an area known as the May Tao Secret Zone, and mainly operated in the east of the province. It consisted of three battalions with a total of 1,850 men.

The D445 Provincial Mobile Battalion also operated throughout the province with an estimated strength of 350 men. Its headquarters were located in the Minh Dam Secret Zone in the Long Hải Hills near the south coast. Since their formation in 1965 they had proven to be an efficient and well-organized force in battles against the Americans during Operation Hardihood and the Australians in The Battle of Long Tan in 1966.

Additionally, there were three district-based VC Guerilla units: C23, the Xuyên Mộc District Company; C25, the Long Đất (Dat Do) District Company; and C41, the Châu Đức District Company. The VC had built up an extensive cadre and political organisation that reached into every town and village.

Phước Tuy's villages and hamlets in the south were grouped around Routes 15 (the main route between Saigon and Vũng Tàu), Route 2, (running from Bà Rịa north to Long Khánh Province), Route 44 (running from Long Dien south to the coast), and Route 23 (running from Bà Rịa north-east to Binh Tuy Province.) The province's roads were dangerous, subject to ambush and passable only with heavy escort. Military estimates placed the number of communist forces in the province at about 5,000. The North Vietnamese Regulars and Viet Cong locals relied on the support of many of Phước Tuy's villages, each of which had its own VC guerrilla squad. Not many villagers were supporters of the South Vietnamese government which they saw as too remote, often corrupt, and not concerned with the concerns of every peasant farmer, such as the reform of land ownership laws. The village of Dat Do, along Route 23, was home to 54% of the provincial population, most of whom were Viet Cong and North Vietnamese supporters, and was concentrated around the best rice fields in the province.

=== Barrier minefield ===
What would ultimately prove to be a tactical blunder by 1 ATF Command and account for the majority of Australian and New Zealand casualties throughout the war, was the laying of a minefield over a 10 km area from the Horseshoe base near Dat Do to the coast.

During the laying of the minefield in May 1967, 13 Australian sappers were killed by faulty ordnance, accidents, stress, and distractions by enemy actions.

By June 1967, 20,292 "jumping jack" mines had been laid by the Australian engineers within a 100-meter-wide strip of cleared ground between a double row of fences. Security of the minefield proved to be ineffective and the VC thereafter simply uplifted the mines and re-used them against the Australians and New Zealanders (if they had not accidentally blown themselves up first.)

== RNZIR in South Vietnam ==
=== Initial commitments ===
The first New Zealand infantry contribution to South Vietnam was a 182-man rifle company which arrived from Terendak Camp in Malaysia on 13 May 1967. Soldiers from C and D Companies 1 RNZIR with six months left in their two-year tour were selected. Most had seen operational service with British forces as part of the 28th Commonwealth Infantry Brigade Group, 17th Gurkha Division in Malaya and Borneo. The company was named "V" for "Vietnam", with the phonetic "Victor."

For the first two weeks, Victor Company (V Coy) served with the outgoing 6 RAR. The New Zealanders adopted the Australian Rifle company formation, consisting of a Headquarters (commanded by a Major) and three platoons, each with three sections (squads.) Each squad was made up of a Corporal, a Scout group made up of two Privates, a Rifle group including a M79 grenadier made up of four Privates, and a Machine Gun group consisting of a Lance Corporal, and two Privates armed with M60 machine guns. Riflemen, including the M79 grenadier, used the Australian 7.62mm SLR semi-automatic self-loading rifle, while officers, signallers, NCOs, and one of each scout group carried the U.S 5.56mm M16 rifle. Eventually the New Zealand infantry would adopt U.S-issue M72 rocket launchers, M26 grenades, and Claymore mines; and other U.S-issue webbing and equipment in addition to the Australian-issue equipment supplied by 1ATF.

V Company's first shakedown mission, Operation Wellington, was a three-day Search and destroy mission around Nui Dat resulting in one VC killed and one wounded and five suspects captured for questioning.

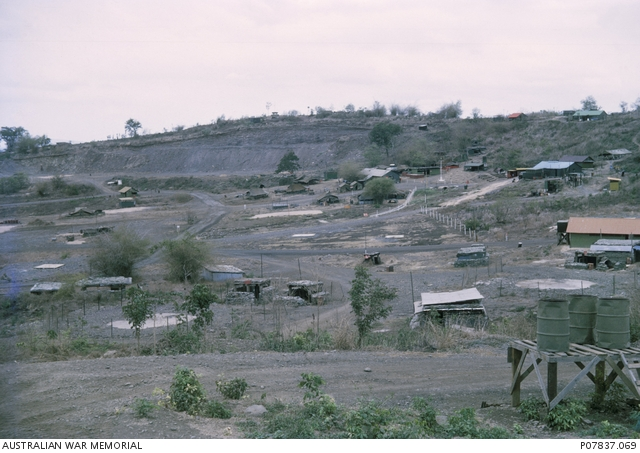
The Horseshoe in 1970

On 27 May V Company relieved A Company 6 RAR at The Horseshoe. V Company came under direct command of 1 ATF headquarters, remaining at The Horseshoe along with 161 Battery RNZA until 3 July, and throughout this time effectively built the position from a rudimentary defended position to a fully dug-in and bunkered, fortified base. While the New Zealanders were at The Horseshoe, 2nd Battalion, Royal Australian Regiment (2 RAR) arrived from Australia to replace 6 RAR. On 3 July, V Company was relieved by A Company, 2 RAR and returned to Nui Dat, thereafter coming under operational control of 2 RAR. Despite being under 2 RAR operationally, V Company did maintain some command autonomy for all non-operational administrative matters which were reported to the New Zealand HQ V Force Headquarters in Saigon.

V Company's first operation with 2 RAR was Operation Paddington (8-16 July 1967) which was a combined Search-and-destroy operation with 7th Battalion, Royal Australian Regiment (7 RAR), Army of the Republic of Vietnam (ARVN) and U.S forces. This operation also established a fire support base at Xuyên Mộc. 1 ATF also provided security for engineer land clearing operations over 136 square kilometers adjacent to and north east of Xuyên Mộc. This operation proved very successful with 171 bunkers, 200 meters of trench, three fighting positions, 32 tunnels and 34 other military structures destroyed. A further 138 bunkers, 14 tunnel entrances, 180 meters of trench and 34 other military structures were damaged and later destroyed by airstrike. 31 VC were killed with no New Zealand casualties.

V Company's next operation with 2 RAR was in Operation Cairns (25 July - 1 August 1967.) This was a Search-and-destroy operation south east of Dat Do and east of the freshly completed barrier minefield. It was known that the VC used the wooded areas east of Dat Do as a base and obtained supplies from nearby villages. Although newly laid, the VC were already uplifting the mines from the minefield and re-laying them or booby trapping them elsewhere. 2 RAR's casualties in this operation were all from mine detonations, none from gunfire. There were no New Zealand casualties.

V Company then spent the next ten days conducting ambushes and search and destroy patrols in the area of the Long Phuoc hills. The company returned to Nui Dat having discovered and destroyed five VC camps and captured quantities of weapons, with 10 VC dead and two wounded taken prisoner, with no New Zealand casualties.

V Company's next operation with 2 RAR was Operation Atherton which began on 16 August. Four teams of Combat engineers from 1 Field Squadron were tasked with conducting land clearing actions. The operation was designed to clear the VC infiltration routes into the east, maintain pressure on the VC base area, and to secure the eastern flank of the task force base. During a patrol on 2 September 1967 an accidental mine detonation resulted in one New Zealander killed and one other wounded. Operation Atherton concluded the following day, on 3 September.

On 4 September V Company, 2 RAR, and 7 RAR were committed to Operation Ainslie, an operation to clear an area of Route 2 and relocate the inhabitants from three villages under VC influence to a new Australian-built village at Ap Suoi Nghe. An additional phase was added to the operation as a result of intelligence gained and V Company and 7 RAR were deployed in blocking positions in anticipation of elements from VC 274th Regiment to cross Route 2. Several contacts were made with 18 VC killed with one Australian casualty and one wounded. There were no New Zealand casualties. By 21 September the village had been built and the villagers moved in. A total of 1,132 persons, comprising 246 families, were resettled.

V Company's final operation with an Australian battalion was in Operation Kenmore (29 September - 11 October 1967) consisting of a Search-and-destroy operation in an area between Xuyên Mộc and Cape Hồ Tràm along the southern coast. With C Company at the Horseshoe and D Company providing security at Ap Suoi Nghe, V Company joined A and B Companies of 2 RAR for the operation. 7 RAR was also deployed. The operation overall resulted in 16 VC killed with weapons, ammunition, ordnance and mines captured. Over 12 tonnes of rice and 12 lb of salt were destroyed, and many documents obtained. 230 bunkers, 300 weapon pits and 74 military structures were also destroyed. There were no Australian or New Zealand casualties.

V Company returned to The Horseshoe 26 October and remained there defending the base and conducting patrols until 12 November where it was replaced by a new Victor company, also from 1 RNZIR in Malaya. The first Victor company completed their tour with one killed and two wounded. From The Horseshoe, the new Victor Company's first tasks were to provide security to Dat Do Village and conduct local ambushes and patrols.

=== Further commitments ===
On 12 December 1967 the Australian government committed a third infantry battalion, 3rd Battalion, Royal Australian Regiment (3 RAR) to South Vietnam, and on 17 December the New Zealand government committed a second infantry company, Whisky Company, also from 1 RNZIR in Malaya.

W Company's shakedown operation was Operation Lawley during 22 and 23 December 1967, consisting of a cordon and search of the village of Ngãi Giao, north of the task force base while Victor 2 Company remained at the Horseshoe.

On 28 December W Company relieved V2 Company at The Horseshoe and V2 Company joined 2 RAR and 7 RAR in the ongoing Operation Forrest, an operation to protect villagers during harvest and deny rice and other food to the VC, near the Phước Tuy-Long Khánh provincial boundaries which had begun on 23 November. The operation concluded 5 January 1968.

Operation Duntroon was the next 1 ATF operation involving V2 Company, 2 RAR, and 7 RAR which was a search and destroy operation conducted in conjunction with U.S 1st Brigade, 9th Infantry Division's Operation Akron V in the Hat Dich area. On the evening of 13 January, while providing left flank protection, a platoon-size group of VC were caught in V2 Company's ambush initiating a firefight that resulted in eight VC killed and 10 weapons captured, with no New Zealand casualties. The operation concluded 21 January.

At The Horseshoe, W Company conducted patrolling, ambushing, and check point duties, with several clashes with the enemy. During a patrol on 26 January, one member of W Company was killed and another wounded from a mine detonation.

==== Tet Offensive ====
The most significant 1 ATF operation in 1968 was Operation Coburg, which was mounted between 24 January and 1 March in the border area between Phước Tuy and Long Khánh provinces shortly after the VC/PAVN launched the Tet Offensive. Operation Coburg was the first operation conducted by 1 ATF outside of Phước Tuy and was aimed at denying the VC the ability to attack the large American bases at Long Binh and Biên Hòa. 2 RAR and 7 RAR were deployed with 3 RAR remaining at Nui Dat to provide base defence. All three troops of engineers from 1 Field Squadron accompanied each of the battalions to provide mine clearing and additional patrols. A fire support base was established north-east of Biên Hòa and east of Long Binh. The two Australian artillery batteries were moved to the FSB.

With W Company stationed at The Horseshoe, V2 Company joined 2 RAR for the operation. On 26 January B Company, 2 RAR fought a two-hour action against about 25 VC entrenched in a bunker system. On the same day 9 Platoon, C Company, 2 RAR also assaulted and occupied a camp initially believed to be of similar strength and held it for 19 hours after repeated attacks from a VC force estimated to be of company strength. On 28 January, whilst providing flank security, V2 Company engaged in a series of skirmishes which resulted in 12 VC dead and many weapons captured with two New Zealanders wounded.

In the early hours of 31 January Biên Hòa Air Base and Long Binh Post came under heavy attack by the Viet Cong 5th Division, as part of the second prong of the VC attacks against Saigon. With the Tet offensive erupting across South Vietnam, Biên Hòa Air Base received heavy rocket fire that caused extensive damage to buildings, aircraft, and facilities, while the Long Binh Depot and the prisoner of war camp were also hit. Over the next three days, the U.S 199th Light Infantry Brigade, later reinforced by the U.S 11th Armored Cavalry Regiment and an infantry battalion from the U.S 101st Airborne Division, were forced into heavy combat fending off PAVN/VC indirect fire and ground attacks. By 1 February the Americans had gained the upper hand following a sweep of Biên Hòa that cleared the town. The attacks on the American bases forced a change in tactics for 1 ATF which was quickly changed from reconnaissance-in-force actions to a blocking operation designed to intercept withdrawing PAVN/VC forces. Between 31 January and 1 February, the Australian battalions, including Victor Company, moved into company blocking positions to intercept the retreating VC following their attacks on Saigon, with many engagements, particularly for 7 RAR. On 1 February V2 Company suffered their first killed in action in a contact with the enemy.

Meanwhile at Nui Dat, A Company from 3 RAR was dispatched to reinforce South Vietnamese Regional Forces following an attack by a 600-strong force from the VC D445 Battalion on Bà Rịa on 1 February. Following a series of street to street clashes the Australians successfully repelled the attack, killing 40 VC. Three Australians were killed and two New Zealand Forward Observers from 161st Field Battery, RNZA were wounded during a rescue attempt of allied advisors from the Sector Headquarters when their vehicle was hit by enemy rocket-fire. On 3 February, D Company, 3 RAR spoiled a harassing attack by the VC on Long Điền, and conducted a sweep of Hoa Long, a village within sight of Nui Dat. On 6 February, a Forward Observer from 161st Bty who was attached to Victor 2 Company was killed by a Viet Cong sniper while on a patrol.

On the morning of 7 February, V2 Company was attacked by elements of three companies from VC 274th Regiment. Fighting was the fiercest that New Zealand troops had faced up to this time, and over the course of an hour the attack was successfully repelled with the assistance of artillery support from the Australian 108th Battery as well as from mortar fire. The VC withdrew following the arrival of gunships, leaving behind 13 dead and a number of blood trails. Nine New Zealanders were wounded in the engagement, six of whom subsequently required evacuation by helicopter. The following day another member of V2 Company was wounded during a contact.

Overall, the fighting in Phuoc Tuy between 1–9 February resulted in 50 VC killed, 25 wounded and one prisoner taken. During this time, five Australians were killed and 24 wounded, and two New Zealanders were killed with 12 wounded (including those from 161st Battery.)

Soldiers from Victor Coy, RNZIR patrol with Australian APCs during Operation Coburg, February 1968

A fire support base had been established earlier by the Americans 17 km east of Biên Hòa near the village of Trang Bom and the U.S 2/35th Field Artillery had arrived 28 January, with C Company, 3 RAR arriving as base defense the following day. 7 RAR was relieved by 3 RAR on 11 February and 7 RAR returned to Nui Dat to begin preparations for their return to Australia. A Company was left to defend the base, while the other three 3 RAR rifle companies continued Reconnaissance-in-force operations around expected enemy exfiltration routes east of Biên Hòa. On 12 February W Company was relieved at The Horseshoe and joined 3 RAR in reconnaissance operations. 161st Battery arrived at the FSB on 14 February, the same day as 2 RAR and V2 Company left the operation to return to Nui Dat.

2 RAR and V2 Company began Operation Oakleigh (15-16 February 1968) which was a cordon and search of the village at Hoa Long. Meanwhile, W Company continued on Coburg under operational control of 3 RAR. On 14 February a member of W Company was accidentally wounded by friendly fire upon his return from a patrol. The following day W Company made three contacts with the enemy resulting in two VC killed and one wounded.

What soon became apparent was that the American FSB had been established too close to the village and base activities could easily be seen by the villagers. On the night of 18 February the Viet Cong launched a massive rocket and mortar attack on the FSB, primarily targeting the U.S and New Zealand artillery positions. Two subsequent waves of VC attacks were held off over two hours with the loss of three members of 3 RAR, one American from 2/35th Field Artillery, and four members of 1st Field Sqn who were caught outside the perimeter while on a standing patrol. 22 Australians and three Americans were wounded. This was the first time 1 ATF had experienced a fire support base being subjected to a ground assault. The base was immediately reinforced by C Company, 3 RAR just in time for a second assault on 19 February, this time with no losses. On 24 February W Company was diverted from relieving 3 RAR at the FSB to report back to Nui Dat in preparation for a new operation with 2 RAR.

Operation Coburg concluded 1 March 1968. New Zealand casualties were two killed and 15 wounded, including one killed and two wounded from 161 Battery. Australian casualties in the operation were 17 killed and 61 wounded. American casualties were one killed and six wounded. VC casualties were 145 confirmed killed, 110 wounded and five captured. Large quantities of weapons and equipment were also captured. Although Operation Coburg was mounted too late to prevent the attacks on Saigon, the Australians and New Zealanders successfully disrupted the VC lines of communication and inhibited their withdrawal efforts, causing heavy casualties in the process.

In the last week of Coburg, the Australian government sent two troops of Centurion tanks from its 1st Armoured Regiment to South Vietnam, arriving on 27 February. Each troop consisted of four tanks plus two tanks with the squadron headquarters. Two bulldozer tanks and two bridgelayer tanks were also committed. A third troop was created out of the headquarters tanks, and by August 1968 the squadron was brought up to its full strength of 26 tanks. Australian and New Zealand infantry would work very closely with these tank troops during their time in Vietnam.

Operation Pinnaroo began on the same day as the arrival of the Australian tanks, with V2 Company and W Company joining 2 RAR to strike at the base areas of VC D445 Battalion in the Minh Dam Secret Zone located in the Long Hải Hills. The operation started with a clearing operation in the village of Long Điền where it was thought retreating VC had moved into. On 29 February, the last day of the sweep, one member of V2 Company was wounded in a contact with the enemy. The battalion was then ordered to conduct patrols to the south and east, between the village and the Núi Đá Dựng hills.

==== Formation of ANZAC Battalion, March 1968 – May 1968 ====
1 March 1968 saw the formation of the "ANZAC Battalion" which was a merger of A, B and C Companies of 2 RAR with V2 and W Companies of RNZIR and renamed 2 RAR/NZ (ANZAC). It was the first official integration of Australian and New Zealand forces into an infantry battalion under the same name since World War I and the only Australian battalion to have five rifle companies. The Battalion deputy commander was an RNZIR Officer. A NZ Component was established at Nui Dat to manage national administration of the New Zealand contingents within 1 ATF.

Operation Pinnaroo continued into March with C Company of 2 RAR/NZ remaining at The Horseshoe while the other four companies patrolled toward the northern slopes of the Long Hải Hills. On 1 March six members of W Company were wounded from two separate mine incidents. On 4 March, W Company and one of the APC troops conducted a cordon and search of the village of Tam Phouc. On 7 March, one member of W Company was wounded by a mine detonation during the search of a house. On 8 March 3 RAR joined the operation, operating from a fire support base 7 km south of the Horseshoe. On 9 March, W Company ambushed five VC from the Long Điền Guerilla Unit, killing three and capturing two. A patrol on 18 March resulted in another of W Company wounded by a mine. V2 Company did not experience any further casualties of their own during the remainder of the operation. 2 RAR/NZ left Pinnaroo on 24 March, leaving 3 RAR to continue.

The following day 2 RAR/NZ and one company from 7 RAR commenced Operation Ashgrove Tram which was a two-day cordon and search based on suspicions that VC were hiding in the coastal township of Long Hai, having retreated there during Pinnaroo. Out of 2,085 persons screened nine VC suspects were apprehended, 80 persons were detained with ID card irregularities and 106 draft dodgers and deserters were arrested and handed over to South Vietnamese authorities. The battalion returned to Nui Dat on 26 March to conduct local patrols.

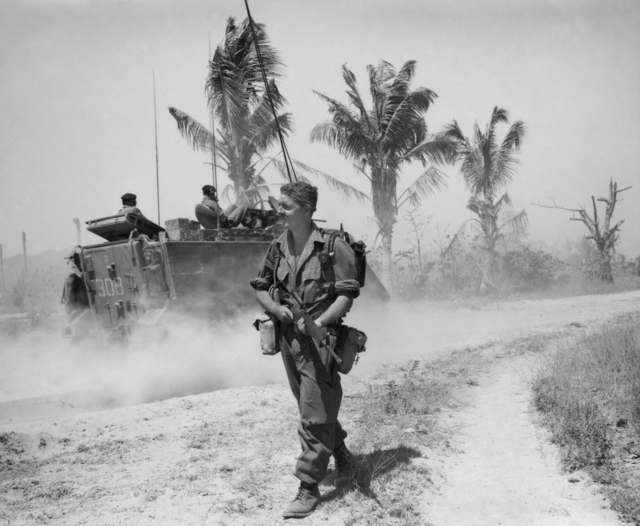
A soldier from W Company, 2RAR/NZ (ANZAC) during Operation Cooktown Orchid, April 1968

===== Clearing the minefield =====
Realising the mistake they had made in laying a minefield which essentially served to arm the enemy, 1 ATF command set about engaging the Australian Engineer Combat Teams to sweep and clear the barrier minefield with APC, tank, and infantry elements of 1 ATF in support. The first of a series of operations to this end was Operation Cooktown Orchid, launched on 1 April 1968. Each phase was assigned to specific companies from 2 RAR/NZ involving land clearing, Reconnaissance-in-force, ambushing, patrolling, and clearing of the barrier minefield. The Australian 17th Construction Squadron and U.S. 34th Engineer Group provided the heavy machinery.

V2 Company was deployed on Operation Cooktown Orchid III in the area of Hoa Long, south of Nui Dat. The company was to establish a platoon ambush on the western approaches to Hoa Long to prevent the movement of VC supply parties. On the night of 5 April a ten-man enemy patrol was caught in a V2 Company ambush with six killed and no New Zealand casualties.

W Company began Operation Cooktown Orchid IV on 6 April with C Squadron, 1st Armoured Regiment conducting a Reconnaissance-in-force in the Xuyen Moc area ("The Long Green.") 14 VC camps were destroyed and a quantity of equipment captured by the time the operation concluded on 9 April.

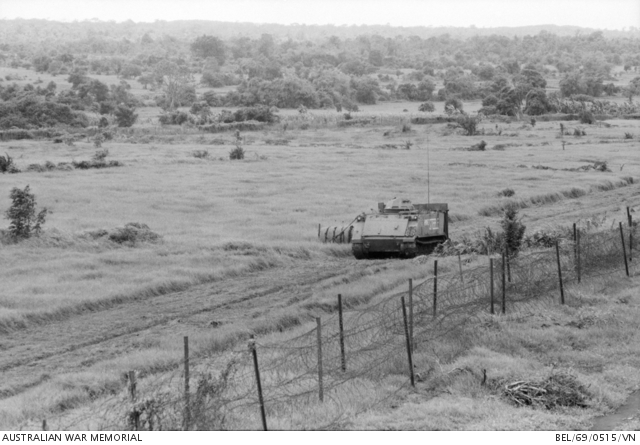
An M113 clears the minefield, July 1969

Operation Cooktown Orchid V began for W Company on 10 April with W Company in command of 2 Troop from C Squadron and elements of 3rd Cavalry and the Australian Combat engineers to clear mines from the barrier minefield with the tanks towing heavy platforms. On that night three members of W Company were wounded by a booby trap. The mine-clearing operation began on 11 April but then terminated in the same day due to damage to the tanks. The tanks returned to Nui Dat for repairs and base defence. On 12 April a recently laid mine was detonated, seriously wounding two New Zealanders, with one dying a month later. (Note: The Vietnamwar.govt.nz entry for Pte Kenneth Robert Akers who was WIA on 12 April 1968 gives a wrong date of the event. See 'Honour Roll of all New Zealanders wounded in action (WIA), killed in action (KIA) or died of wounds (DOW) in Vietnam' record for the correct date.) Following a cordon and search of a local village on 14 April, the company returned to Nui Dat to conduct local patrols.

On the following day 3 RAR returned from Operation Pinnaroo. By the end of the operation 3 RAR had suffered heavy casualties, the majority from accidental mine detonations.

On 18 April W Company relieved C Company 2 RAR, who had been given Operation Cooktown Orchid I, in protecting 17th Construction Squadron undertaking land clearing with bulldozers and Rome plows on the northern slopes of the Long Hai mountains. W Company was relieved by the 1 ATF Reinforcement Unit and returned to Nui Dat on 22 April.

On 25 April, 2 RAR/NZ and 3 RAR were deployed to Long Khánh Province to join Operation Toan Thang I which had commenced two and a half weeks earlier. The operation, involving U.S., ARVN and Royal Thai Volunteer Regiment forces was launched in anticipation of a VC offensive against Saigon and the military installations of Long Binh Post and Bien Hoa Air Base. Subsequent clearing operations undertaken by W Company were without incident. A mishap on 27 April whereby Australian mortars accidentally shelled V2 Company's night position resulted in five New Zealanders wounded. On 3 May W Company discovered a large battalion-sized VC camp with 250 bunkers which had been abandoned. 3 RAR was relieved by 1 RAR (which had relieved 7 RAR in April) on 5 May and 1 RAR and 2 RAR/NZ were redeployed further north into Bien Hoa Province. The PAVN/VC May Offensive struck Saigon on 5 May but failed to achieve the success of its earlier Tet Offensive in February. By 7 May the attack on Saigon had been successfully repulsed by the American and ARVN forces. For the Australians and New Zealanders who were elsewhere conducting ambushing tasks on likely approach routes to the Bien Hoa complex very few contacts were made and on 10 May 2 RAR/NZ returned to Nui Dat to prepare 2 RAR and Victor 2 Company for their departures from South Vietnam. From 20 to 23 May W Company joined C Company 2 RAR to protect a land clearing operation near Ap Soui Nghe as part of Operation Toolong.

==== 4 RAR/NZ (ANZAC) May 1968 – May 1969 ====
In May 1968 Victor 2 was replaced by Victor 3. The new Victor Company also brought a RNZE Assault pioneer section. By the end of their six-month tour Victor 2 had sustained one killed and 20 wounded. Hereafter the tour of duty for all RNZIR companies was extended to twelve months.

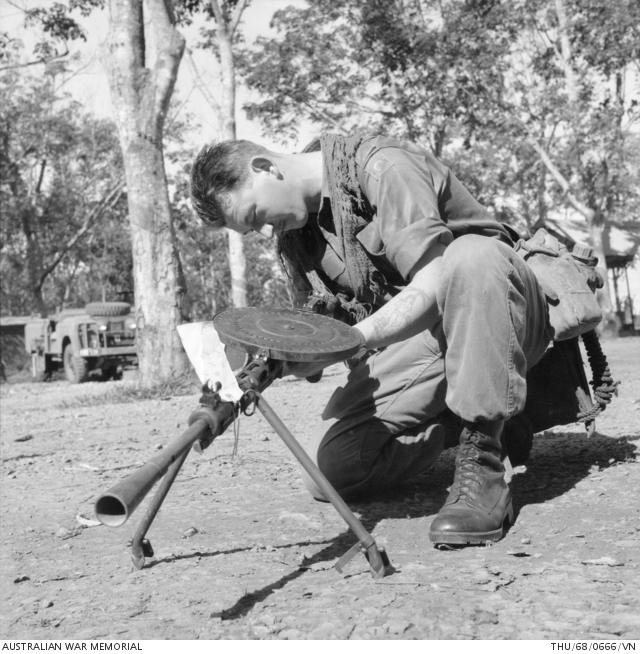
4RAR/NZ soldier with captured Vietcong Degtyaryov machine gun at Nui Dat in June 1968

On 1 June 2 RAR was replaced by 4th Battalion, Royal Australian Regiment (4 RAR) and the joint Australian and New Zealand infantry forces became 4 RAR/NZ (ANZAC.) Again, the battalion was commanded by an Australian with a New Zealand 2IC.

The new Victor Company deployed to The Horseshoe on 5 June. 4 RAR with W Company completed their first shake-down operation, Operation Redwing on 10 June which was a one-day search operation in the Binh Ba rubber plantation and jungle areas north-west of Route 2 where it was known VC held meetings, collected taxes from the villagers, disseminated propaganda and gathered rice from the plantation workers.

4 RAR then joined with W Company for Operation Kosciusko on 15 June. The battalion moved to an area south west of Route 15 to conduct search-and-destroy patrols. A number of contacts were made with one member of W Company injured from a claymore blast on the last day of the operation, on 20 June. A quantity of weapons, food, and equipment were seized and a battalion-sized training camp was discovered and destroyed.

While at The Horseshoe, a major contact occurred on 22 June when V3 Company tracked and killed three VC on a patrol. The company came upon an enemy camp with 70-80 VC. A ferocious firefight ensued with one New Zealander killed in one of the first volleys. The company was pinned down but managed to fight off two enemy assaults. Helicopter gunships and mortar support saved the patrol from being wiped out. Four members of V3 Company were wounded in the battle with three confirmed VC killed.

From 23 June the battalion (less V3 Company) took part in Operation Toan Thang II along the Biên Hòa-Long Khahn border. The operation's objectives were to deny enemy infiltration routes into Saigon and to identify rocket-launching sites. 4 RAR/NZ was sent to assist 1 RAR which was relieving the U.S 199th Light Infantry Brigade. Since commencing the operation 10 days earlier, 1 RAR had seen no signs of the enemy and had made no contacts. 4 RAR/NZ patrolled west of 1 RAR's position. During patrolling, W company had one contact with the enemy. On 3 July 1 RAR was relieved by 3 RAR. W Company then provided security for the operation's fire support base until 18 July.

V3 Company rejoined 4 RAR/NZ for the battalion's next operation, Operation Merino which began on 18 July. The operation saw W Company initially positioned as fire support base defence while V3 Company patrolled with 4 RAR along Route 15, near the village of Thai Thien. On 20 July the firebase was moved some 4 km east of Route 15 to an area known as "The Blackstone Trail" where patrolling continued. Following airstrikes and artillery bombardment on a bunkered enemy camp that had been found by V3 Company on 22 July, that night all companies mounted an attack on the enemy camp but the area had been decimated and vacated. Operation Merino ended 29 July, with the battalion having engaged in 33 days of continuous operations.

1 August saw W Company deploy on Operation Lyrebird which was a land clearing operation from Route 15 to the north operating from two fire bases and with W Company providing defence for the engineers from 17th Construction Squadron and patrolling the area.

Also on 1 August, V3 Company moved out by APCs and with the tanks of 3 Troop to a site four kilometres north of Ngãi Giao village on the western side of Route 2 to establish a fire support base in support of 3 RAR as part of Operation Platypus. V3 Company provided security defence for 161 Field Battery RNZA and B Battery, 2/35th US Artillery. The company patrolled in the vicinity of the fire support base without contact, returning to Nui Dat when the operation ended on 13 August and then redeploying two days later to Ap Sui Nghe to patrol and establish observation posts. V3 Company was relieved on 26 August.

During W Company's land clearing operation, on 4 August the fire base established for the operation was fired on with Rocket propelled grenades (RPGs) badly damaging two of the bulldozers and injuring two members of W Company. Despite numerous contacts with VC in the area, after five weeks Operation Lyrebird ended on 4 September resulting in a cleared trail through the jungle some 200 metres wide and 13,500 metres long.

On 7 September Operation Innamincka was launched which was a cordon and sweep against a suspected enemy camp in Nui Nhan involving both RNZIR companies and B and C Companies from 4 RAR, with D Company remaining at The Horseshoe. There were two minor contacts during the initial sweep, with one VC killed and one wounded by V3 Company. For the second stage the operation became a battalion Reconnaissance-in-force further west. V3 Company flew to the western edge of the area of operation and B Company moved south, while C and W companies commenced sweeping south-west. W Company made minor contact, but the other companies saw and heard nothing of significance. The operation finished on 12 September.

With D Company at The Horseshoe, the remainder of 4 RAR/NZ was next tasked with a three-part operation, Operation Hawkesbury beginning on 12 September. The four companies were moved into blocking positions east of Route 2 on the western edge of Thua Tich, in the north east of the province. The operation also involved 1 RAR sweeping east to west and 3 RAR in a defensive position to the south. It was hoped for 1 RAR's sweeping actions to push the enemy into 2 RAR/NZ's positions. B and C Companies were moved to the area of the Blackstone Trail to carry out a Reconnaissance-in-force. V3 Company and W Company were both deployed north to the area of the Courtenay rubber plantation to intercept a consignment of rockets believed to be moving from east to west. V3 Company took up blocking positions on the western edge of the plantation while W Company swept westward. On 14 September one member from W Company was killed by a sniper during a patrol. A further search of the area led W Company to discover a system of tunnels with caches of equipment, food, and medical supplies.

Acting on new intelligence, 1 ATF Command redeployed 2 RAR/NZ and 1 RAR north into the Hat Dich area on 15 September. On 16 September, V3 and W companies joined C and B companies at the "Blackstone Trail." All companies made contacts with the enemy. V3 Company ambushed and killed 10 VC over the next two days. C Platoon found an enemy camp of 150 bunkers, killing two VC and capturing a large amount of equipment and detailed enemy maps. Documents indicated the area was the headquarters of VC 84 Rear Service Group. Unfortunately the following day, while C Company were still in the bunkers, American fighter planes accidentally strafed the position injuring 14 Australians. W Company discovered a number of fortified positions which had been hastily vacated and confirmed two VC killed. The battalion returned to Nui Dat on 24 September.

Upon return to Nui Dat, W Company made it known that they wished to return to an area where well-worn tracks had been discovered on a previous operation, but not checked out. On 28 September W Company, with a section of mortars from 4 RAR, mounted an independent operation, Operation Sceptre, in the area of Ngãi Giao, on Route 2 north of Ap Sui Nghe. The company established its own fire support base and patrolled from it. Results were eight VC killed and one captured with no New Zealand or Australian casualties.

V3 Company also did an independent operation: Operation Stirrup Cup. This was a one-day operation carried out to the east of Route 15, near Thai Thien, as part of a "rice-denial" programme. On 3 October the company deployed to the area by APC, discovering rice and other food supplies defended by a caretaker group of VC. The company recovered and destroyed 56,200 lb (23 tonnes) of rice, 1,000 lb (407.5 kilograms) of salt and other food and materials. One VC was killed during the contact.

Upon completing their own operation, W Company returned to Nui Dat on 6 October to undertake base defence duties and to prepare for Operation Capital. This would be Whisky Company's last operation.

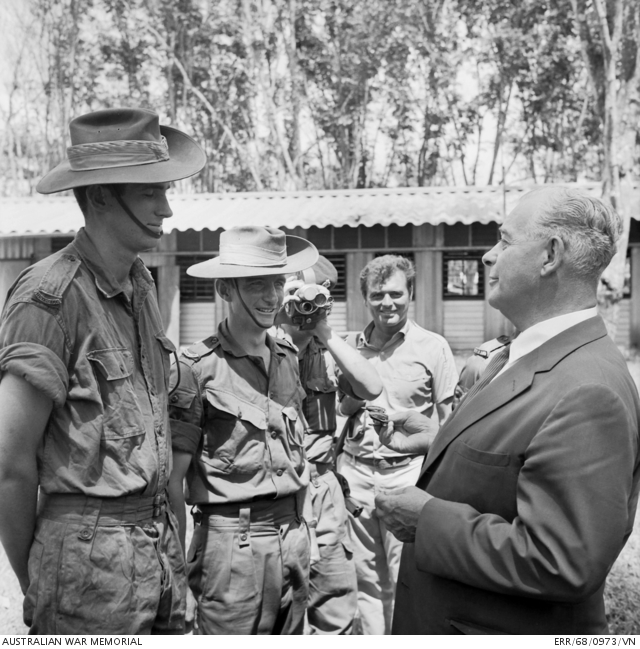
New Zealand Prime Minister, Keith Holyoake meets 4RAR/NZ soldiers on a visit to Nui Dat, 8 November 1968

Operation Capital was a two-phase operation conducted again in the area of Thua Tich where the VC 84 Rear Services Group supplied the local VC forces and grew crops and stored large caches of supplies and equipment. 3 RAR was deployed to the area on 12 October and 4 RAR/NZ was deployed on 13 October. W Company and 104 Field Battery established their fire support base on the edge of the Courtenay rubber plantation with W Company providing base security. V3 Company worked with C and D Companies of 4 RAR patrolling east. On 16 October, V3 located a large enemy camp complete with HQ command area, first aid post, printing equipment, kitchens, huts with bunkers underneath, female living quarters, and 19 bunkers with trenches. Due to the size of the camp, V3 Company and the engineers took two days to demolish it. The battalion flew back to Nui Dat on 30 October with the intent of luring the VC out to where they had been and then having the battalion redeploy to the area to catch them by surprise as the second phase of the operation. 4 RAR/NZ, less W Company which remained at the base in preparation for their departure from Vietnam, redeployed three days later to this end. The second Whisky Company arrived in theatre on 8 November 1968 and began training at The Horseshoe. By the end of their tour Whisky 1 had suffered three killed and 17 wounded. The new Whisky Company also brought an Assault pioneer team.

While Whisky 2 trained at the Horseshoe, V3 Company and C Company 4 RAR engaged in local patrols and ambushes. On 16 November, V3 Company was fired on during an ambush resulting in one New Zealander killed and three wounded.

===== The pink Citroën =====
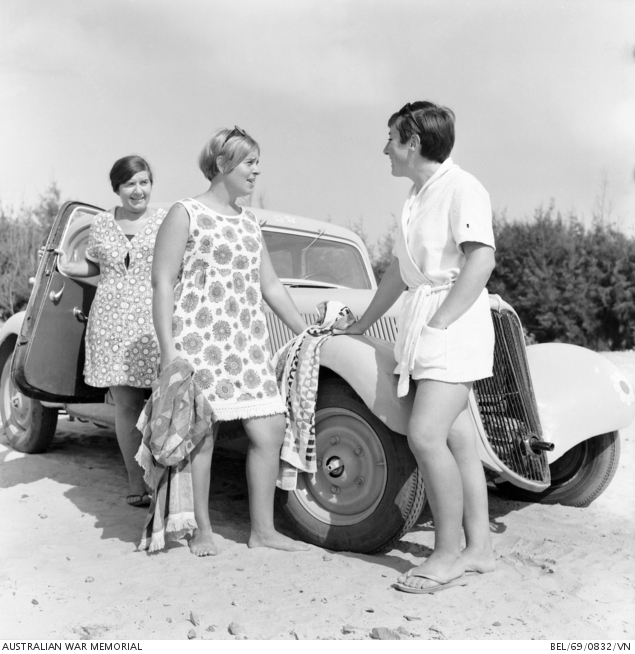
1st Australian Field Hospital nurses alight from the Citroen

During a patrol on 27 November, V3 Company discovered an abandoned 1948 Citroën Traction Avant car with two bullet holes in the back window and with the licence plate "NVA 601" near the Courtenay rubber plantation. Although they were told to get rid of it by headquarters, V3 Company brought the car back to Nui Dat by way of an Iroquois helicopter from 9 Squadron, RAAF. Members of V3 company attempted to get the car running, but were unsuccessful. The car was given to the 102nd Field Workshops, Royal Australian Electrical and Mechanical Engineers and was fixed up by off-duty members. The car was painted pink and donated to a Sister of the Royal New Zealand Nursing Corps at the 1st Australian Field Hospital at Vung Tau, to be used by her and other nurses to drive around in. The vehicle was passed on over the following years. (Note: Noel Hains' account of this story conflicts with Ross Miller's in that Hains states that the car was fixed by RAEME personnel and Miller states that the car was fixed by RNZEME personnel)

Operation Capital II concluded on 22 November with 3RAR returning to Nui Dat, however, 4RAR/NZ remained in the area until 30 November. Both phases of the operation amounted to 48 days of continuous operations.

===== Battle of Hat Dich =====
On 11 December 4 RAR/NZ, less both RNZIR companies, returned to the Long Khánh-Biên Hòa border as part of Operation Goodwood which had commenced a week earlier with 1 RAR. V3 Company remained at Nui Dat as base defense while the new Whisky company continued at The Horseshoe. The operation was launched in response to increased VC activity that suggested a Tet offensive for 1969 was being planned. Australian, U.S., Thai and South Vietnamese forces were put under 1 ATF command for the operation with 1 RAR as the main Australian battalion. W2 Company were replaced by V3 Company at The Horseshoe and joined operations on 31 December. On 1 January 1969, the newly arrived 9th Battalion, Royal Australian Regiment (9 RAR) deployed from Nui Dat to relieve 1 RAR in the Long Thanh district and 1 RAR was redeployed along Route 15 on a new operation in support of Goodwood. 9 RAR and 4 RAR/NZ continued on with the primary operation. An accident on 11 January resulted in a British national from W2 Company being killed in a friendly fire incident. On 13 January 4 RAR/NZ returned to Nui Dat for a break and was relieved by 1 RAR who were then redeployed on Goodwood.

On 20 January W2 Company commenced a three-day operation with 2/48th ARVN Battalion and 586 South Vietnamese Regional Force Company. No contacts were made.

Operation Goodwood ended on 27 January. On the same day Operation Goodwood, Phase II began with 4 RAR/NZ, less its New Zealand companies, deployed to the Hat Dich to replace 1 RAR which had returned to Nui Dat to make preparations for their return to Australia. W2 Company rejoined the battalion the following day. During the night of 29 January, W2 was attacked from three directions with RPG, small arms, and machine gun fire resulting in three New Zealanders wounded. The enemy withdrew after artillery fire was called in. On 30 January, V3 Company was relieved by C Company at The Horseshoe and joined the operation. On the same day all four rifle companies made contacts with small groups of VC all within only a few hours of each other. Three members of V3 Company were wounded in their contact. A VC camp was discovered and quantities of ammunition, medical supplies and rice were captured. By 7 February an FSB was established near the village of Phuoc Long, further north and west of Route 15. V3 Company deployed to the south of the village, with B Company to the north and W2 Company to the east. Ambushes and patrols by all three companies continued to make contacts with the enemy, with the New Zealand companies alone claiming a dozen enemy killed and wounded over the three-day period of 8–10 February. On the night of 15 February D Company ambushed 15 VC in six sampans travelling along the Suoi Cau river. Two sampans were sunk and six VC killed before the survivors made it to the river bank to engage the Australians with small arms and RPGs. On 16 February B Company was attacked by VC in a bunker system resulting in two Australians killed and three wounded. Five tank crew were also wounded when their tank was hit multiple times by RPGs. Later intelligence suggested that the position had been occupied by the headquarters of the 274th Regiment and one of its battalions. Operation Goodwood, Phase II concluded on 19 February, with both phases having amounted to 78 days. 4 RAR/NZ and 9 RAR returned to Nui Dat to immediately commence with Operation Federal as a follow-up.

Australian casualties in Goodwood amounted to 21 killed and 91 wounded. ARVN and RF casualties amounted to 31 killed and 81 wounded. New Zealand casualties were 1 killed and 6 wounded. The Americans suffered 7 wounded. PAVN/VC losses amounted to at least 245 killed, 39 possibly killed, 45 wounded and 17 captured, during 274 separate contacts. Nearly 2,000 bunkers were uncovered and many destroyed, while more than 280 RPGs, 70 anti-personnel mines, 490 grenades and 450 pounds of explosives were captured overall. Although there were few major actions, the operation was considered a success by 1 ATF Command and the PAVN/VC in the Hat Dich area were significantly weakened.

For Operation Federal 4RAR/NZ was deployed east of the U.S base at Long Binh and south of Song La Buong River while 9 RAR was deployed to the north. Enemy forces anticipated were elements from VC 5th Division, namely 274th VC Regiment and the newly relocated PAVN 33rd Regiment. The enemy were expected to attack from the east. V3 Company was furthest north with B Company to the south and W2 Company alongside the river. On 23 February W2 Company had three small contacts with enemy groups up to six strong. That same night the company position and a ten-man standing patrol both came under attack by an estimated company-strength force with the resultant firefight lasting almost two hours. Four members of the patrol were wounded. During the fight, one enemy soldier accidentally mistook the New Zealand patrol for his own men and in turn was shot dead. He was later identified as the Commanding Officer of the PAVN D525 Engineer Reconnaissance Battalion whose task it had been to breach the defenses of Long Binh Post. With AC-47 Spooky air support from the Americans, the enemy withdrew. The following morning, seven enemy dead were found with an estimated 20 more fatalities from the artillery and mortar fire.

5 RAR relieved 9 RAR on 10 March, having arrived in February and concluding their first battalion operation in the northern and eastern parts of the Nui Dinh hills. With a total of 26 enemy killed, 12 wounded and four captured, 4 RAR/NZ was relieved by 5 RAR on 24 March after 33 days in the area. W2 Company's contact was the biggest contact of the operation.

Operation Overlander commenced in Biên Hòa Province on 8 April 1969 with C, D, V3, and W2 Companies sent in to search for VC forces that had been earlier pushed south by 5 RAR. On the following day three members of V3 Company were wounded from a grenade blast in a contact with a VC party. On 13 April, V3 Company found a series of bunker systems and supply caches yielding key documents revealing details of the VC supply group supporting the forces in the Hat Dich secret zone. On the same day V3 Company found large quantities of ammunition, explosives and workshop tools and materials. W2 Company provided security for the fire support base established for the operation. On 15 April W2 Company encountered strong resistance from a VC camp with superior numbers, resulting in seven VC killed with five New Zealanders wounded. With 14 VC killed and six wounded in the operation, the battalion again returned to Nui Dat on 17 April.

===== Pacification and Vietnamization =====
On 16 April, 1 ATF was advised of a change to operational priorities, with top priority given to eradicating the VC presence and influence among the civilian populations, followed by the upskilling of the South Vietnamese military forces. These programs were known as Pacification and Vietnamization respectively as part of the Winning Hearts And Minds strategy being undertaken by the Americans. 1 ATF would be increasingly called upon to provide support to a number of civil community reconstruction projects and assist in the training of South Vietnamese forces.

4 RAR/NZ's last battalion operation was Operation Stafford from 17 April to 1 May conducted in and around the Bình Ba rubber plantation. The objective was to try and destroy the local C41 Châu Đức District Company. Intelligence had also revealed that VC 274th Regiment may have moved into the area following recent task force operations. It was also hoped for to encounter the Bình Ba and Duc Thanh Guerrilla units. An FSB was hastily established and W2 Company was positioned as base defence while V3 Company and C and D Companies patrolled. V3 Company was particularly successful, managing to capture a high-value VC operations officer from 274th Regiment on 28 April, ending their tour on a high.

On 8 May, Victor 3 was replaced by Victor 4. By the end of their tour Victor 3 had suffered two killed and 22 wounded. The new Victor Company conducted operations with Whisky 2 and 4 RAR while 4 RAR made their preparations to return to Australia.

On 11 May, following a request from the Americans at Blackhorse Base Camp, the home base of 11th Armored Cavalry Regiment in Đồng Nai Province, W2 Company was deployed to help the Americans defend the base from enemy attack. In two days the New Zealanders and Americans together achieved 20 enemy killed, with four killed by W2 Company. Numerous weapons were captured.

On 15 May, W2 Company and 3 Platoon from V4 Company were deployed to Dat Do to help 9 RAR reestablish control of the area. The remainder of V4 Company stayed at Nui Dat base conducting local patrols while 4 RAR prepared to return to Australia. 9 RAR and W2 Company cordoned off the village trapping a company-sized enemy force. Both RNZIR companies conducted sweeps without incidents. 1 ATF forces maintained the cordon until 19 May.

==== 6 RAR/NZ (ANZAC) May 1969 – May 1970 ====
On 19 May, 4 RAR was replaced by 6 RAR and the two RNZIR rifle companies with their Assault pioneers and mortar teams merged with A, B and D Companies of 6 RAR to become 6 RAR/NZ (ANZAC), once again with an Australian commander and a New Zealand 2IC. The main focus of 6 RAR/NZ was the "Pacification" program.

After the new battalion's shakedown operation, Operation Hunter (21-26 May 1969), 6 RAR/NZ carried out its first operation in this program from 30 May when it launched Operation Lavarack. This operation involved the establishment of a number of fire support bases to the north of the 1 ATF base, from where company-sized patrols were deployed to specific areas to conduct ambushes and searches. The purpose was to establish enemy movement patterns, particularly those by supply groups, such as the 84 Rear Services Group, which could lead to the location of the main force units. All five rifle companies were deployed, with A Company in the south, B Company in the west, V4 Company in the northwest, D Company in the northeast, and W2 Company in the centre north of a Fire support base. Contacts were made by all companies on the first few days leading to the discovery that the PAVN 33rd Regiment had moved into the area, a fact unknown to 1 ATF Intelligence.

On 5 June, one member of W2 Company was killed on approach to an enemy bunker thought to have been destroyed in an immediately prior attack. Despite supporting mortar and artillery fire, the New Zealanders were trapped for four hours and could not be rescued by APC due to difficult terrain. With the additional assistance of attack helicopters the enemy withdrew and W2 Company moved in to clear the bunker system the following morning. The enemy were revealed to be the VC D440 Battalion, approximately 100 strong.

On 6 June three companies from 1/33rd PAVN Regiment with elements from VC D440 Battalion, the Binh Ba Guerilla Squad, the Ngãi Giao Guerrilla Squad and the Chau Duc District Company attacked the village of Binh Ba. 1 ATF Command deployed the Task Force Ready Reaction Force, which consisted of D Company 5 RAR, 1 Troop B Squadron 1st Armoured Regiment and 3 Troop B Squadron 3 Cavalry Regiment under operational control of 6 RAR/NZ. South Vietnamese Regional Forces were deployed in blocking positions. Intense door-to-door fighting took place in order to clear the village and it became apparent that additional PAVN forces were in the area. B Company 5 RAR and additional APCs and tanks were sent as reinforcements and the clearing of the village was passed to 5 RAR as Operation Hammer. The PAVN/VC were driven out by 8 June, but the village of Binh Ba was all but destroyed.

Also on 6 June the 1 ATF base at Nui Dat was attacked with rockets and mortars and later in the day 9 RAR came under heavy mortar fire at their fire support base southeast of Dat Do. The 1 ATF base was again mortared on 7 June. A contact on 11 June by B Company 6 RAR revealed the enemy they had engaged to be PAVN 74th Artillery (Rocket) Regiment, who were responsible for the rocket attacks on Nui Dat and the FSB.

On 12 June, a sentry from V4 Company observed 200 PAVN soldiers carrying approximately 50 wounded on litters emerge from the bush into an open area. This was reported to Battalion headquarters. It was thought these were the same forces that A and B Companies had had multiple contacts with earlier in the week. V4 Company was ordered to observe while gunships were called in. However, the element of surprise was lost when the Battalion's support helicopter arrived first, alerting the enemy and causing them to scatter. V4 Company opened up on the group with all weapons brought to bear but were too far to cause any effect. Subsequent helicopter gunships and artillery fire caught some of the fleeing troops but most managed to escape. Some weeks later Military Assistance Command, Vietnam (MACV) Intelligence discovered that the commanding officer of that same group that V4 Company spotted had been "severely disciplined" for what had happened.

On 17 June, V4 Company located a large enemy camp with bunkers and caches and was fired on by heavy small arms and RPGs resulting in one New Zealander being killed.

All companies continued to make contacts and on 20 June, after three days laying in wait in an ambush position, D Company sighted a group of 60 PAVN retreating with wounded. The ambush was sprung and a third of the group was killed. The group was later identified as 1st Battalion, 274th VC Regiment whom were on their way to a hospital facility in the Mây Tào Mountains.

On 22 June, 6 RAR's Anti-tank platoon, which had been operating as a Tracker team and as a fourth rifle company under D Company, joined up with V4 Company north of the village of Xa Binh Gia. On the same day one section of W2 Company encountered enemy bunkers and were fired upon by small arms and RPGs by an estimated company-strength force. With artillery support called in the New Zealanders withdrew with three wounded in the engagement.

Operation Lavarack ended on 1 July. The operation proved to be very successful for 1 ATF. 6 RAR/NZ was involved in some 85 contacts with PAVN/VC forces during this time, resulting in over 102 enemy killed and at least 22 wounded. New Zealand casualties were two killed with seven wounded. Australian casualties were one killed and 23 wounded. The PAVN and VC Main Force units were severely weakened as a result and D440 Battalion was disbanded with the remainder transferred into D445 Battalion.

With the rest of the battalion remaining at the base, V4 company and B Company together with a team of Tunnel Rats from 1 Field Squadron, next conducted a small operation in the area of the "Firestone Trail" between 5–10 July, Operation Waiouru, with no contacts.

By this stage of the war, Australian and New Zealand casualties continued to be mostly from mines that the VC had pulled from the Australian barrier minefield and re-laid or had booby trapped. 9 RAR had suffered heavy casualties from mine detonations in a five-week mine clearing operation (Operation Reynella) between 8 May and 15 June. 5 RAR continued mine clearing in the same region (Operation Esso) from 15 June to 15 July, also suffering heavy casualties from mines. Beginning in July 1969 the Australian engineers devised a more effective solution for sweeping the mines from the barrier minefield, by towing steel rollers behind APCs.

===== Operation Mundingburra: the deadliest operation =====
6 RAR/NZ next undertook Operation Mundingburra in the Long Hải Hills on 15 July 1969. This operation would prove to be the single most deadly operation for 6 RAR/NZ. The operation had three objectives: disrupt enemy infiltration into the villages, maintain regular checkpoints on the main access routes between the villages, visit local hamlets and offer medical services to those villagers who might need it. 6 RAR's Anti-Tank platoon and a team of engineers from 1 Field Squadron, accompanied the Australian and New Zealand platoons.

A Company from 6 RAR deployed by helicopter to the east of Route 44 in an area colloquially known as "The Light Green" (for the colour of the vegetation.) B Company from 6 RAR deployed by APC east of Xuyên Mộc. The New Zealanders of Victor 4 Company deployed to the area of the Dinh Co Monastery, west of Route 44. D company from 6 RAR deployed east of the Long Hải Hills. The second New Zealand company, Whisky 2, deployed to Route 44 to provide security operations along the route. All platoons conducted mine clearing and ambushing tasks.

On 18 July, 6 Platoon from B Company discovered an occupied camp. In the early morning B Company attacked the camp, killing four Viet Cong and recovering documents, with five Australians wounded. The enemy were discovered to be C3 Company of D445 Battalion.

In the first five days of the operation 6 RAR/NZ made numerous contacts resulting in over a dozen enemy killed and a steady supply of food and ammunition caches recovered.

On 21 July two M16 mines were tripped by two members of A company, the second during the medical evacuation of the wounded from the first detonation. The incident resulted in two Australians killed and 24 wounded.

On 23 July, while V4 Company was in the process of clearing the Dinh Co Monastery for use by the locals, a mine discovered by the engineers was detonated killing two Australian sappers and wounding one other. A few hours later one member of W2 Company was killed with five others wounded, two of whom died of their wounds shortly thereafter, from a mine detonation near the hamlet of Ap Lo Gom.

On 2 August one member from V4 Company was killed by a booby trap with five others wounded while unloading a truck at the South Vietnamese Regional Forces outpost at Lo Gom.

The following day 6 RAR lost one of their Assault pioneers and two others were seriously wounded in a mine detonation.

On 12 August an RNZE Assault pioneer with W2 Company was killed and three others wounded, with one dying of wounds three months later, from a mine explosion whilst clearing mines from an area surrounding the school at the hamlet of Phuoc Loi.

After 31 days Operation Mundingburra ended on 14 August. 6 RAR/NZ's casualties were 11 killed (six New Zealanders and five Australians) and 54 wounded (10 New Zealanders and 44 Australians.) Enemy killed numbered 22 with four wounded and two captured. The incident with the Australians on 21 July would be the major inspiration for the 1983 pop song I Was Only 19 by the Australian band Redgum.

On 18 August 1969, the battalion conducted a ceremony on the site of the Battle of Long Tan to dedicate a memorial (known as the Long Tan Cross) to the engagement in which the 161st Battery, Royal New Zealand Artillery played a major role in 1966. All five rifle companies from 6 RAR/NZ deployed to sweep the area first for any possible enemy presence and once cleared the monument was airlifted in by helicopter and erected by the Assault pioneers.

From 26 to 28 August, V4 Company deployed into the area of the Courtenay rubber plantation for a reconnaissance-in-force on Operation Tekapo. V4 Company saw two contacts and a large cache of building equipment was recovered with no casualties.

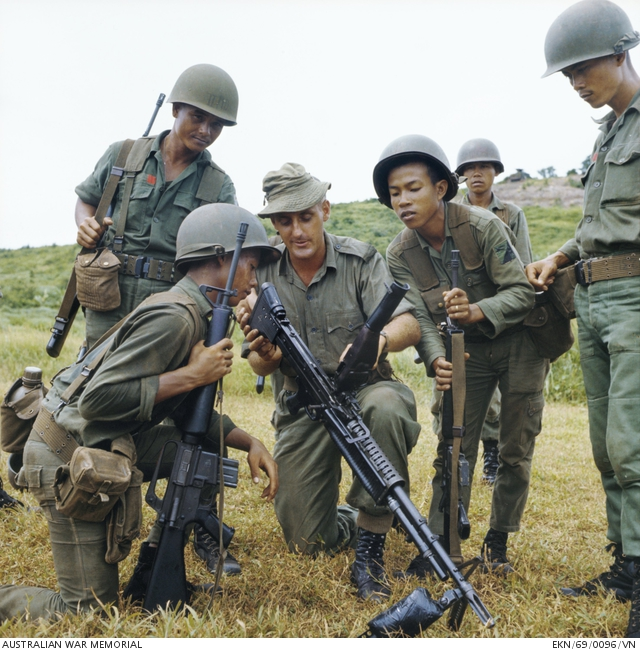
6RAR/NZ soldier explains the M60 machine gun to ARVN 18th Division soldiers at the Horseshoe

With B Company at The Horseshoe, the remainder of 6 RAR/NZ next conducted Operation Burnham which was a land clearing operation with the "Jungle Eaters" of the U.S. 60th Land Clearing Company beginning on 29 August. The operation started with V4 Company establishing and operating out of a fire support base and providing security for the U.S bulldozers. W2 Company was tasked to clear ground in front of the American engineers while A and D Companies provided security to the south and west. During patrolling on 15 September V4 Company discovered an enemy defensive position consisting of 67 bunkers, 130 fighting trenches, 27 trenched shelters, 12 kitchens, and a lecture area. Cooking equipment and ammunition were recovered and the position was destroyed. W2 Company had a close call on the evening of 17 September when nearby Royal Thai Army artillery accidentally shelled W2 Company's position with air burst White phosphorus munitions and then later that night again with 155mm M198 howitzer illumination rounds. On 25 September, V4 Company engaged in a firefight with 12 PAVN, killing four, one of whom was identified as a senior officer of the PAVN 74th Artillery Regiment. During a patrol on 26 September, two members of W2 Company were wounded by enemy gunfire when they discovered and attempted to sweep an enemy bunker.

6 RAR/NZ was relieved by 9 RAR and flown back to Nui Dat on 30 September.

6 RAR/NZ commenced Operation Ross on 13 October and V4 Company joined on the 15th to provide security for the fire support base established in "The Long Green." 6 RAR/NZ was tasked with harassing D445 Battalion and other VC elements in the area. After numerous contacts, and with one of V4 Company wounded in a contact on 19 October, the New Zealanders were relieved on 24 October leaving the Australian Companies of 6 RAR to continue the operation.

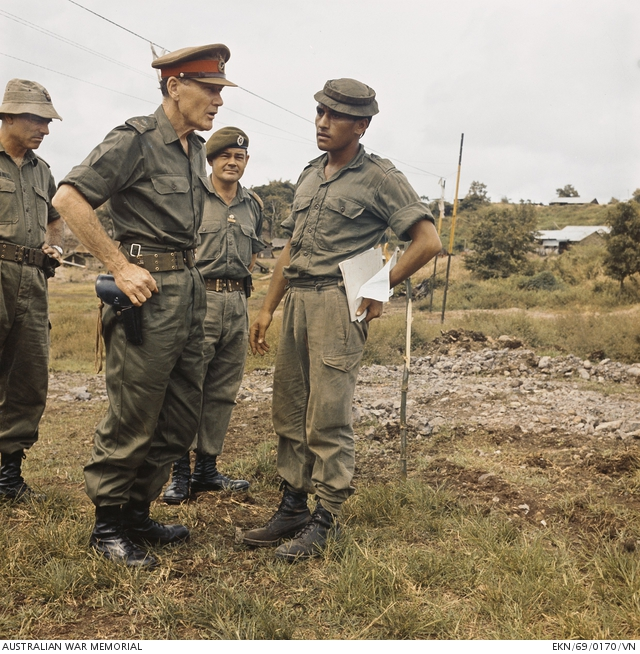
Australian General Thomas Daly speaks to a member of V4 Company at The Horseshoe during a rare visit to Vietnam, 2 November 1969

On 28 October, V4 Company was despatched to The Horseshoe where they were to train ARVN 4/52 Battalion soldiers and have them work alongside them. On 2 November the New Zealanders were greeted by the 1ATF commander and the Australian Chief of the General Staff, General Thomas Daly in a rare visit to Vietnam.

Whisky 2 was replaced by Whisky 3 on 14 November 1969. By the end of their tour, Whisky 2 had suffered seven killed and 26 wounded. During this new rotation a mortar section and Assault pioneer section were added.

On 24 November, whilst on patrol with the ARVN near The Horseshoe, V4 Company suffered casualties from a command detonated mined resulting in two New Zealanders killed and two New Zealanders wounded, with a Vietnamese interpreter and two ARVN soldiers also wounded. On the same day the new Whisky Company joined 6 RAR for their first operation in the ongoing Operation Ross. V4 Company returned to Nui Dat on 28 November and 6 RAR with W3 Company returned 30 November upon the conclusion of Operation Ross.

===== Operation Marsden =====
Operation Marsden (3–28 December 1969) was conducted in the Mây Tào Mountains where the VC 5th Division was headquartered. By mid 1969 the Ba Long Province Unit had replaced the 84 Rear Services Group in providing logistics functions for the PAVN/VC forces in the area and assumed administrative control of the VC 274th and 275th Regiments as well as the local VC guerilla forces in Ba Long, Xuan Loc, Dinh Quan, Xuyen Moc, Dat Do and Chau Duc. The area was also the location of the K76A Hospital which Intelligence had learned was the principal provider of medical services for the regional PAVN/VC forces. The Mây Tào mountains had never before been successfully penetrated by allied forces.

All five infantry companies, including their mortar teams and Assault pioneers, from 6 RAR/NZ were deployed on 2 December. 4/52 ARVN Battalion was deployed with V4 Company.

A Company scaled the mountains, having to make their way through a 200-meter-wide minefield of improvised mines made from undetonated U.S. Air Force Cluster bombs.

On 8 December, D Company located the first major stores dump in a cave at the south of the mountains. It contained approximately 2,500 anti-personnel grenades, 22 anti-tank mines, 22 boxes of anti-watercraft mines and a large quantity of weapons, equipment and explosives. On the same day, B Company, on the north side of the mountain, found the first signs of the hospitals. The following day they discovered a bunker system of 12 bunkers identified as part of K76A Hospital.

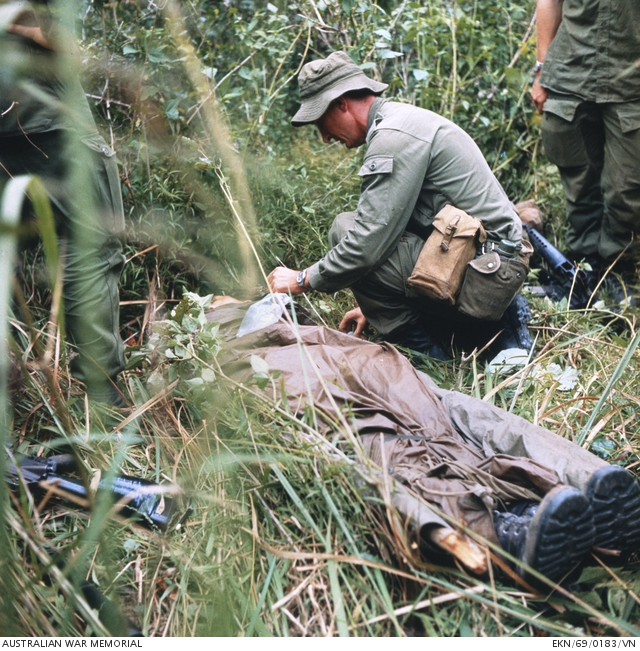
New Zealand Army Roman Catholic chaplain delivers last rites to a 6RAR/NZ private killed during Operation Marsden, 11 December 1969

On 11 December V4 Company, operating in the south-east, located 17 large bunkers large enough to take up to 100 patients and identified it as also part of K76A. By this time all companies were discovering enemy signs and having contacts. On the same day W3 Company, which was patrolling north-east of the Song Rai River, located a large enemy camp with 25-28 VC and at first light the following day attacked the group with one VC killed while the remainder escaped. The group was identified as belonging to Ba Long Rear Services Group and the Ba Long Procurement Section. A Company successfully scaled the western side of the mountain and were able to establish a fire support base on the summit. On 14 December 4/52 ARVN left the operation. On 16 and 17 December D Company located the K76A pharmacy, dental post, and orderly room. There they recovered a huge supply of medical drugs.

On 19 December, V4 Company discovered the major part of the hospital, a 200-bed complex complete with underground pharmacy, operating pits and convalescing wards. An enormous cache of medical supplies, food, tools, and equipment were found at the hospital and a large weapons cache was discovered nearby. Over the next week all rifle companies conducted day and night search and destroy missions in their areas, spending Christmas 1969 in the field. The new W3 Company's involvement in the operation was uneventful. All companies returning to Nui Dat by 28 December.

Four Australians were killed with nine wounded during the operation. There were no New Zealand casualties. Enemy killed numbered 22 with five wounded and 21 prisoners, 14 of whom had been patients of the K76A Hospital. Between D Company's and V4 Company's finds, approximately 1.5 tonnes of pharmaceuticals had been captured, possibly the largest amount ever seized in the war by allied forces. The discovery of the hospital would prove to be a catastrophic defeat for the PAVN/VC forces in the area.

On 30 December W3 Company was deployed on their second operation, a short search and destroy mission with B and D Companies from 6 RAR in Operation Bluewater. All companies were inserted into an area 12 km north of The Horseshoe where D445 Battalion was thought to be present. There were no contacts and W3 Company returned to Nui Dat again on New Years Day 1970.

The first operation for 1970 by 6 RAR/NZ was Operation Napier which commenced on 10 January, to cordon and search the village of Ngãi Giao and then conduct reconnaissance and ambush operations in the area. Along with their Assault pioneers, W3 and V4 Companies conducted daily patrols around the area of the village with almost daily contacts with the VC. V4 Company's contacts included contact with the Ngãi Giao Guerilla Squad. On 13 January V4 Company moved to a new area, conducting ambushing and patrolling with great success including capturing key local VC political cadres.

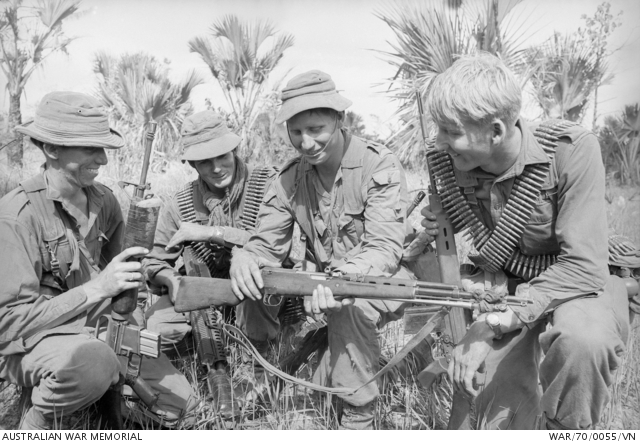
6RAR/NZ soldiers examine an SKS captured during Operation Matilda, January 1970

On 15 January, W3 Company's mortar section was deployed with B Company, 6 RAR in Operation Matilda. With 1st Armoured Regiment and 3rd Cavalry, B company and the New Zealand mortar section conducted a sweeping action from the coast to the mountains and then across to Nui Dat in an effort to drive the enemy into 5 RAR who were sweeping from north-east. The operation resulted in a number of contacts for 5 RAR. The W3 mortar team returned to Nui Dat 26 January.

Continuing in Operation Napier, from 23 January the Assault pioneer platoons from 6 RAR were put under the command of W3 Company and added to their patrols. From 24 January W3 Company was making daily contacts with the VC. The company's success was marred when on 30 January two members of the company were wounded in an ambush with one New Zealander dying of wounds six weeks later. W3 Company returned to Nui Dat on 12 February having killed 17 VC with many more wounded and as many captured. V4 Company returned to Nui Dat a week later, on 20 February.

On 15 February 1970, W3 Company and their mortar team, was despatched to The Horseshoe while the rest of the battalion prepared for Operation Gisborne. A company from the 5th Cavalry Regiment of the ARVN 18th Division joined W Company at The Horseshoe and underwent training, eventually going out on night patrols with the New Zealanders in March. Duties at the Horseshoe involved one platoon patrolling and ambushing, the second platoon as base defense, and the third platoon providing security for the engineers clearing the barrier minefield. Also in February a new 7 RAR arrived to replace 5 RAR in their final tour.

Operation Gisborne (28 February - 10 March 1970) was launched as a follow up of events that occurred in February during Operation Hammersley in which 8 RAR had discovered the headquarters of D445 VC Battalion in the Minh Dam Secret Zone while providing security for a land clearing operation in the Long Hai Hills. 8 RAR had suffered heavy casualties in the operation and were unable to pursue the retreating D445 Battalion which were forced out of the Minh Dam Secret Zone to the area of Dat Do. Operation Gisborne was therefore launched to search and destroy D445 Battalion. Less W3 Company, 6 RAR/NZ commenced Gisborne on 28 February. On the same day A Company, 6 RAR/NZ discovered the relocated headquarters of D445 Battalion and a company from D440 Battalion. The enemy fled during the night following artillery barrages. The evacuated bunker systems were found the next day by A Company and V4 Company. The enemy withdrew to the south-east. On 3 March 8 RAR was deployed on Operation Hamilton in support of Gisborne. On 8 March D Company, 6 RAR/NZ was involved in a clash with elements of D445 Battalion in "The Long Green", resulting in three Australians killed and six wounded. Operation Gisborne ended on 10 March with one New Zealander wounded in a contact on the last day. 8 RAR continued on with Hamilton until 24 March.

On 18 March, V4 Company embarked on Operation Waipounamu, an independent Search and destroy mission into the Nui Dinh Hills to search for the C41 Châu Đức District Company. On the second day of the operation two members of 2 Platoon were injured in a command detonated mine and evacuated by helicopter. Shortly thereafter 3 Platoon was ambushed by a well-concealed and strongly defended VC camp, later discovered to have been the size of two companies. The lead scout was killed instantly in a command detonated claymore mine which initiated the ambush. 3 Platoon was immediately hit with RPGs and machine gun fire, wounding four of the five New Zealanders of the lead section. The two M60 machine gunners of the second section held the VC back but the New Zealanders were pinned down. As artillery support was not feasible due to unsuitable topography, U.S helicopter gunships were instead called in to strafe the enemy bunker. As a result, the VC retreated. V Company returned to Nui Dat on 20 March.

===== Operation Townsville: "The biggest intelligence coup of the war" =====
6 RAR/NZ, less W3 Company commenced Operation Townsville on 23 March on what would become a four-week search and destroy mission in the north-eastern regions of Phuoc Tuy province. This would also be 6 RAR's and Victor 4's final operation. The following day, after the ARVN troops had spent a month at The Horseshoe with W3 Company, Operation Raven began to move the ARVN troops back to their home base in Xuan Loc. While the rest of W3 Company escorted the ARVN troops home, W3 Company's mortar section was deployed on operations with 3rd Cavalry Regiment in and around the Courtenay rubber plantation and remained with them until the end of April. W3 Company arrived with their ARVN colleagues at Xuan Loc on 29 March. W3 Company returned to The Horseshoe the following day.

Operation Townsville resulted in a huge coup for the ANZAC forces when on 8 April V4 Company encountered an enemy camp which after a short firefight and the enemy fleeing, turned out to be the headquarters of the Ba Long Province Unit. B Company was sent to chase them and made contact resulting in three VC dead, and two wounded. Amongst the documents captured were the operational signals codes and one-time cipher pads used by the VC headquarters. As a result, senior U.S commanders including MACV commander General Creighton Abrams, were purported to have referred to it as "the biggest intelligence coup of the war." On 15 April W3 Company was relieved at The Horseshoe by 7 RAR and joined the rest of 6 RAR/NZ on Townsville. V4 Company suffered their last casualty during this operation, losing one of their officers during a contact with the VC on 17 April. Operation Townsville concluded 24 April, with 6 RAR and V4 Company both ceasing operations in preparation for their departures from Vietnam.

On 4 May, W3 Company - together with their mortar section which had just returned from operations with 3rd Cavalry - and an Australian Engineer Splinter Team were deployed to Long Sơn Island to destroy VC positions on the island while protecting the engineers from 17th Construction Squadron who were building water sources for the commune of (Xa) Long Son. With 6 RAR making preparations to leave, W3 Company was put directly under the command of HQ 1 ATF. Patrols escorted the engineers to and from the village each morning and when they finished their work in the evening. On 10 May one of the W3 mortar crew was wounded when the Fire support base was fired on. The W3 mortar section remained at the fire base until the end of May.

On 5 May 1970, Victor 4 was replaced by Victor 5. By the end of their tour Victor 4 had suffered six killed, one dying from an illness while on active duty and 14 wounded.

==== 2 RAR/NZ (ANZAC) May 1970 – May 1971 ====
2 RAR began arriving from 28 April 1970 and between 10 and 25 May, 2 RAR and Victor 5 conducted operational training and attended briefings in preparation for operations while W3 Company continued operations on Long Son Island.

On 15 May, 2 RAR fully replaced 6 RAR and with Whisky 3 (now six months into their tour) and Victor 5 became for the second time 2 RAR/NZ (ANZAC). This tour continued to be focused mainly upon the Pacification program which 1 ATF had adopted as its first priority in April, 1969.

W3 Company, less 2 Platoon which remained with the W3 mortar section on Long Song Island, was deployed on 15 May to an area west of the Nui Dinh Hills on Operation Ashfield. The company established a small fire base and began reconnaissance and ambush operations. Support was also provided from the mortar team at the fire base on Long Son Island. The company made a number of contacts and on 22 May one member of W3 Company was wounded in an attack from a bunker system containing 15–20 VC. One VC was killed and a number of weapons, equipment and documents were recovered, identifying the members as being from C21 Chau Duc Company.

Following a familiarization operation for 2 RAR and V5 Company, W3 Company returned from Operation Ashfield to join 2RAR/NZ's first battalion operation: Operation Capricorn on 26 May.

On 28 May 1970 it was announced by 1 ATF Command that the barrier minefield had been cleared of all mines. Of the 20,292 mines originally laid, approximately 12,000 were "unaccounted for" and an estimated 7,000 had been uplifted by locals sympathetic to the VC. Over 50% of 1ATF casualties during 1969-1970 were from mines taken from the minefield.

During a patrol on 29 May, a tripped booby trap resulted in one New Zealander from W3 Company killed and one other wounded. Only a few hours later a pressure mine detonation resulted in two Australians from C Company killed and three others wounded – the first casualties of the new battalion. Meanwhile, W3 Company's detached platoon and mortar team returned from Long Son Island to Nui Dat on 30 May. On 2 June, an officer from W3 Company was wounded from shrapnel from an RPG when the platoon discovered and fired on a VC camp. 2 RAR/NZ ended Operation Capricorn on 9 June.

Operation Cung Chung marked a concentrated return of 1 ATF forces to the Hat Dich area beginning on 12 June. This operation was a Task Force reconnaissance-in-force involving all battalions with the purpose of denying the PAVN/VC access to villages and to use their supply routes. 2RAR/NZ was positioned along Route 15, 8 RAR was positioned along Route 2, and 7 RAR held positions along Routes 23 and 44. All companies conducted ambushing, security operations around the villages and reconnaissance actions in search of enemy camps. W3 Company remained at Nui Dat providing base security. During a reconnaissance of an enemy camp on 18 June, one member of V5 Company was killed from a command detonated 155 mm howitzer shell with another dying of wounds shortly after. Two others were also wounded from the blast and three others were wounded by enemy fire during the ensuing firefight.

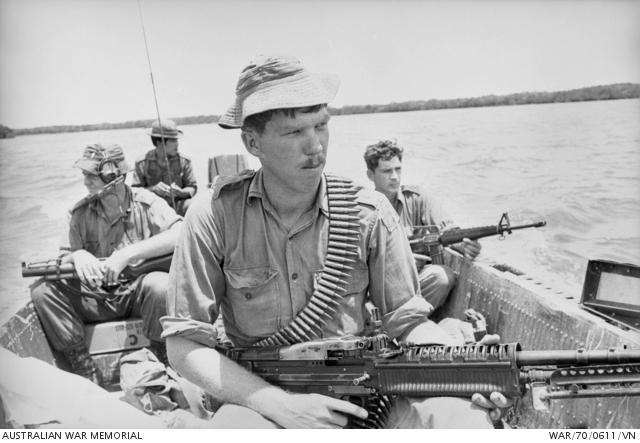
2RAR/NZ river patrol, July 1970

2 RAR and V5 Company underwent refresher training from 30 June until 13 July. While that was occurring W3 Company, the mortar platoon of 2 RAR, and 1 ATF HQ's Defence & Employment (D&E) Platoon were temporarily placed under operational control of 8th Battalion, Royal Australian Regiment (8 RAR) who were engaged in Operation Petrie, the mission of which was to destroy VC D440 Battalion. W3 Company's involvement was to support 8 RAR's operations north of Nui Dat, under Operation Quartermile. The operation was downgraded to supplying security to the villages of Bình Ba and Ap Suoi Nghe along Route 2.

From 13 July 2RAR/NZ, less 2RAR's Assault Pioneer Platoon, commenced Operation Nathan. (The Assault Pioneer Platoon joined with engineers from 1st Field Squadron to patrol the mangrove swamps and waterways of the Rung Sat Special Zone.) W3 company went north to the fire base established alongside Route 2 (FSB "Le Loi") in which 8 RAR and 161 Bty RNZA were operating. W3 Company commenced search and destroy operations in the Binh Ba rubber plantation. On 21 July while approaching a VC camp, W3 Company was fired on by an RPG, wounding three men. On 26 July, V5 Company, who were operating in the Nui Toc Tien mountains, were pursuing a retreating enemy into caves in the mountains. The VC had mined the area around the caves, several of which were set off, wounding nine members of V5 Company and one member of the New Zealand Special Air Service who was acting as a scout for the platoon. W3 Company remained at FSB Le Loi until 2 August when it was relieved by 8 RAR.

Operation Cung Chung II was launched 3 August involving 7 RAR, 8 RAR and 2 RAR/NZ to ambush VC supply routes. W3 Company, less their mortar team, departed the operation on 10 August returning to Nui Dat from 14 to 22 August to provide security for the base.

The W3 mortar team returned to Nui Dat on 29 August and at the request of 3rd Cavalry were deployed the next day with them and a troop of the Australian tanks, engineers from 1 Field Squadron, and 1 ATF HQ D&E Platoon on Operation Massey Harris, a food denial program conducted in the area of Bình Châu along the western border of Phuoc Tuy and Binh Tuy. It was known that this was the area that 84 Rear Services Group (who had relocated from the Mây Tào Mountains in 1969) were growing crops. One of the APCs struck a booby trapped mine injuring 12 Australians, eight of them D&E Platoon members whom were riding in the APC. A Kit Carson Scout was killed in the blast, the only fatality.

W3 Company again came under operational control of 8 RAR and was redeployed from Nui Dat onto Operation Cung Chung II and from 31 August provided security for Australian land clearing teams. A number of contacts resulted in important information about the VC units operating in the area and in particular a contact by W3 Company on 20 September resulted in important documents being captured revealing the effectiveness of the recent ambushes and details of supply line changes to D445 VC Battalion and C41 Châu Đức District Company. Operation Cung Chung II concluded 10 September and 2 RAR/NZ, less W3 Company, returned to Nui Dat for a further period of rest and retraining. W3 Company continued operations with 8 RAR.

W3 Company's mortar teams completed Operation Massey Harris and on 18 September rejoined W3 Company for their last two days of operations with 8 RAR.

With W3 Company back with the ANZAC Battalion, 2 RAR/NZ and 7 RAR were redeployed on Operation Cung Chung III on 21 September. W3 Company left the operation on 25 September, and returned to Nui Dat to take over as the base ready reaction force.

On 28 September an ambush laid by V5 Company resulted in eight VC killed and one captured. Intelligence gained from the prisoner led to the discovery of the location of C41 Châu Đức District Company headquarters.

On 8 October W3 Company was replaced as the base security force by V5 Company and sent to assist C Company, 2 RAR who had found a large enemy camp and had come out of a firefight with casualties. On 10 October a friendly fire incident on a patrol resulted in four members of W3 Company being wounded with one dying of wounds the next day. W3 Company left the Hat Dich on 14 October and spent their last month patrolling north of the Nui Dinh Hills, finishing operations on 31 October.

A patrol undertaken by V5 Company on 31 October (coincidentally occurring on the last day of active duty of Whisky 3's tour) resulted in one New Zealander killed and two others wounded. The report of this incident was revealed some 30 years later to have been a fabrication and in fact the incident had been a friendly fire incident, the facts of which had been suppressed by the platoon hierarchy and company commanders.

===== Reduction of U.S and Allied Forces =====
Continuing with President Nixon's Vietnamization program (to hand over control to the South Vietnamese government and local military forces), during 1970 the United States had been steadily reducing its forces in South Vietnam including those that operated in the Phuoc Tuy-Long Khanh regions. Consequently, the U.S artillery units that supported 1 ATF were withdrawn from South Vietnam in November. The Australian and New Zealand governments also took measures to reduce troop strength. After three tours Whisky 3 Company was withdrawn in November and was not replaced. By the end of their tour Whisky 3 suffered three killed and 13 wounded. Thereafter, Victor 5 was the only RNZIR infantry company in theatre for the remainder of 2 RAR/NZ's tour. Also in November, 8 RAR returned to Australia and was not replaced, reducing 1 ATF to only two battalions: 2 RAR/NZ and 7 RAR. Further U.S reductions saw the 2nd Brigade 25th Infantry Division which operated north of the Phuoc Tuy-Long Khanh borders begin its departure in December 1970, withdrawing entirely by May 1971. The U.S 11th Armored Cavalry Regiment (less one squadron) also began to withdraw from February 1971.

Between December 1970 through to 21 February 1971, 2 RAR/NZ and one troop from 1st Armoured Regiment, always under operational control of 2 RAR/NZ, conducted night ambushes around Hoa Long, returning each day to Nui Dat.

To offset the withdrawal of the second New Zealand infantry company, in January the New Zealand government committed the 1st New Zealand Army Training Team (1 NZATTV) to South Vietnam. 1 NZATTV was made up of advisors from all branches of service, a number of whom had served in the RNZIR companies and the RNZA battery in South Vietnam. The team assisted an American training team at the Chi Lang National Training Center in Châu Đốc Province to train South Vietnamese platoon commanders in weapons and tactics.

From 1 February 1971 Operation Phoi Hop began which was to begin handing over 7 RAR's area of operations to ARVN forces. 7 RAR's involvement ended 21 February in preparation for their return to Australia, with 2 RAR/NZ relieving 7 RAR. At the same time, the Australian and New Zealand SAS Platoons were withdrawn and on 25 February a new 3 RAR arrived from Australia to relieve 7 RAR. On 26 February 3 RAR was deployed to the Horseshoe to commence in-theatre training. 2 RAR/NZ supplied a rifle company to 3 RAR to assist.

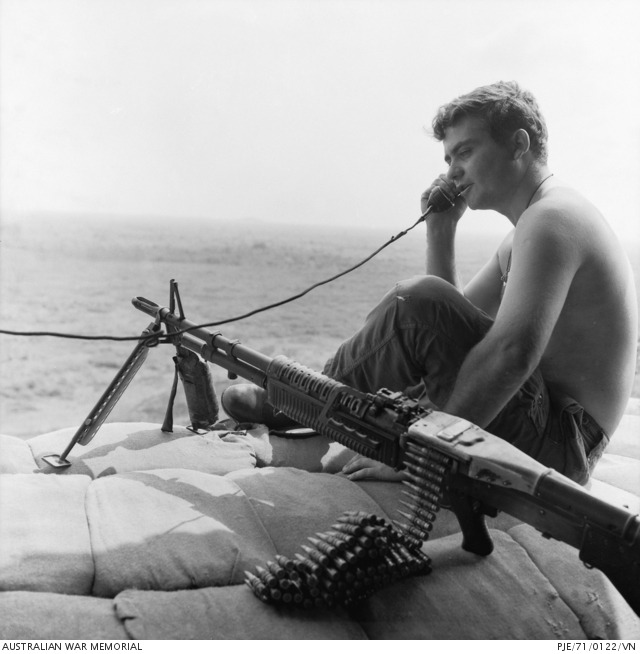
2RAR/NZ machine gun position at the Horseshoe, March 1971

Even though 2 RAR/NZ was reduced to three rifle companies, full-scale operations nevertheless continued through March with the 2 RAR/NZ companies conducting ambushes and patrolling with the Australian APCs and tanks, from several fire support bases. The battalion made several contacts with elements of VC D445 Battalion for a total of 30 VC killed.

On 10 March V5 Company lost their platoon commander with another wounded when a Claymore mine accidentally detonated from a fire caused by M60 tracer ammunition during a contact with the enemy.

3 RAR's training was cut short when 1 ATF Intelligence confirmed that VC D445 Battalion was moving in to disrupt the handover actions being done by the task force as part of the overarching Vietnamization program. 3 RAR was deployed to intercept D445 Battalion. Several contacts occurred and a bunker system was found and destroyed. To further 3 RAR's successes, A Company 2 RAR/NZ was placed under operational control of 3 RAR on 26 March, further reducing 2 RAR/NZ to just one Australian rifle company and the one New Zealand rifle Company. 3 RAR were then deployed on Operation Briar Patch I to directly search for and destroy D445 Battalion while the remainder of 2 RAR/NZ continued on Operation Phoi Hop. After 3 RAR was involved in heavy fighting on 31 March V5 Company relieved C Company, 3 RAR. The operations by 2 RAR/NZ and 3 RAR to track down D445 VC Battalion continued throughout April but the VC managed to escape and withdraw into Long Khanh Province. Victor 5 Company returned to Nui Dat at the end of April to make preparations to leave South Vietnam and return to Singapore. Operation Phoi Hop concluded 2 May. Victor 5 ended their tour in South Vietnam having suffered four killed and 27 wounded.

==== 4 RAR/NZ (ANZAC) May 1971 – December 1971 ====
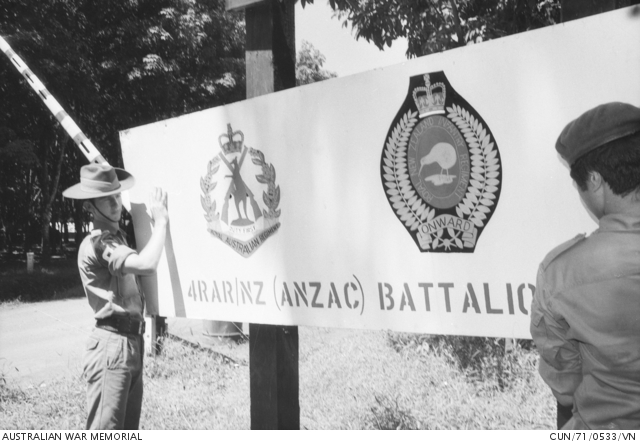
4RAR/NZ (ANZAC) sign at Nui Dat, November 1971

On 6 May 1971 Victor 5 was replaced by Victor 6. Victor 6 was highly trained and experienced with all NCOs and some privates having served in Borneo or Malaya, or with earlier Whisky or Victor Companies in Vietnam.

After completing familiarization training with 3rd Cavalry, V6 Company commenced their first operation on 15 May in the area of the Courtenay rubber plantation, while the outgoing 2 RAR conducted short reconnaissance and ambush operations in around Nui Dat until end of their operations on 20 May.

Also in May the 161st Battery of the Royal New Zealand Artillery left Vietnam, further reducing 1 ATF's artillery capabilities. The battalion had served continuously since 1965.

On 22 May 2 RAR was replaced by a new 4 RAR rotation. The final and sole New Zealand infantry company was integrated with B, C and D companies of 4 RAR to become 4 RAR/NZ (ANZAC) for the second time, serving until the withdrawal of the Australian and New Zealand combat troops. As with the previous ANZAC battalions the 2IC was an RNZIR officer, this time Major Don McIver.

Unlike previous battalions whom conducted rotational duties as base defence or at The Horseshoe in addition to field operations, 4 RAR/NZ would spend the entirety of their tour on operations in the field with rotations at Nui Dat as the Task Force Ready Reaction Force and for rest and retraining.

From 3–5 June, the new ANZAC Battalion conducted their shakedown operation, Operation Bhowani Junction, in the area of the Courtenay rubber plantation.

By 1971 Phước Tuy had been largely cleared of local VC forces, who were now increasingly reliant on reinforcements from North Vietnam. As a measure of some success, Route 15 was opened to unescorted traffic. However, the reduction of American and Australian forces did not go unnoticed by the PAVN/VC. Intelligence reports obtained by 1 ATF in June, in conjunction with information gathered by the SASR, located the VC D445 Battalion and the PAVN 3/33 Regiment east of Route 2 along the border between Phuoc Tuy and Long Khanh. Operation Overlord was launched in response on 5 June. 2/8 Battalion from the U.S. 1st Air Cavalry Division's 3rd Brigade was brought into the operation, with 4 RAR/NZ and 3rd Cavalry placed in a static role of cordoning through ambushing, while 3 RAR with tanks from C Squadron 1st Armoured Regiment were deployed on search-and-destroy actions. Between 6-7 June, 3 RAR became involved in intense fighting against elements of the PAVN 33rd Regiment and VC 274th Regiment in the Battle of Long Khánh, sustaining heavy casualties during these engagements, but the battalion successfully hindered their attempts to move south into the province.

Operation Overlord concluded on 14 June to be immediately followed up with Operation Hermit Park, with 3 RAR this time in the static role and 4 RAR/NZ tasked with locating and destroying elements of VC 274th Regiment and C41 Châu Đức Company. This operation would be a significant engagement for Victor 6 Company.

B and C Company 4 RAR were deployed to the south west of the province to search for C41 Company while V6 Company was deployed to the north west border where the 274th Regiment was thought to be reestablishing itself.

On 24 June 1971, while approaching the outskirts of a bunker one member of V6 Company was shot by a sentry, dying of wounds later that night after medevac efforts were hampered. The following day V6 Company joined with the tanks of C Squadron to assault the bunker position. The first assault was met with heavy resistance from RPGs, heavy machine gun fire and grenades with one of the tanks destroyed and two Australian tank crew and two New Zealanders wounded. The wounded were airlifted while taking fire. After withdrawing to safety V6 company was briefed for a new assault and in the afternoon five Australian tanks lead the assault on the bunker with V6 Company following behind. Braving heavy fire, the combined firepower of the tanks and V6 Company forced the enemy to withdraw by the evening with a total of four members of V6 Company wounded and five enemy dead. The position was discovered to have been held by 1st Battalion, VC 274th Regiment, an estimated 40–60 men. Operation Hermit Park concluded 27 July.

===== Courtenay Hill =====
From the middle of July 1971, 4 RAR/NZ progressively occupied a large hill overlooking the Courtenay rubber plantation, nicknamed "Courtenay Hill" which was strategic also for the fact that it was located midway between the PAVN/VC bases in the Hat Dich and in the Mây Tào Mountains. Accompanying 4 RAR/NZ was the radio detachment from 104 Signal Squadron. Initially secured by the D&E Platoon, the hill was solid rock and had to be built up with over 100,000 sandbags to provide adequate observation and defense functions. Courtenay Hill became the headquarters and Command Post of 4 RAR/NZ thereafter.

On 28 July, 3 RAR and 4 RAR were immediately deployed on Operation Iron Fox to conduct operations along the Suoi Ca river near the Long Khanh and Phuoc Tuy borders with the purpose of further restricting VC 274th Regiment's efforts to re enter the province. V6 Company remained at Nui Dat as the ready reaction force. On 5 August 4 RAR/NZ were deployed on Operation Northward, conducting ambushing and patrolling from Courtenay Hill.

== Australian and New Zealand withdrawal ==
In August 1971 the Australian government announced that 1 ATF would be withdrawn from South Vietnam before Christmas. The New Zealand government also announced New Zealand's withdrawal. On 29 August the Australian tank regiment fully ceased operations in preparation for its return to Australia.

Operation Northward was hastily concluded on 18 September following further intelligence obtained alerting 1 ATF to the presence of the PAVN 33rd Regiment in the province. Operation Ivanhoe was immediately launched on 19 September with the purpose to find the 33rd Regiment headquarters and its 3rd Battalion. Unbeknownst to 1 ATF Intelligence was that the 33rd Regiment's 2nd Battalion, had also entered the province. Between the two battalions, enemy numbers amounted to 1,100 highly trained Regular forces. 1 ATF was reduced to only two battalions and the Australian SAS by this time (NZSAS had left in February.) The New Zealand artillery and Australian tanks had gone, leaving only the APCs and Australian artillery for ground support.

=== The last battle ===
D Company from 3 RAR was put under operational control of 4 RAR/NZ and joined 4 RAR/NZ on Operation Ivanhoe with 3rd Cavalry, 104th Field Battery and 161st Independent Reconnaissance Flight in support. V6 Company patrolled west of Route 2 conducting Search-and-destroy patrols. D Company patrolled east of Route 2 with one of the troops of M113 armored personnel carriers. 3 RAR's other three companies were also deployed west of the Song Rai River nearer to the Long Khanh border.

The commander of the PAVN 33rd Regiment, Colonel Nguyen Van Thuong, had received reports from VC spies that most of the Australian artillery was being packed up for shipping back to Australia. They knew the Australian tanks had already left, therefore it was expected that any fight between PAVN and Australian forces would be between infantry forces alone. The 33rd Regiment would therefore bait and lure the Australians with traps and eliminate them with their greater numbers. The first attempt occurred on the 19th September when the 33rd Regiment rocketed the South Vietnamese Regional Force outpost at Cam My village however the Australians did not respond.

On 20 September the 33rd Regiment launched a rocket attack on an Australian APC column travelling on its way back to Nui Dat from Courteney Hill along Route 2. Colonel Thuong had laid a massive ambush for the responders. B Company 4 RAR/NZ who were the ready reaction force at Nui Dat travelled out by APC as expected, but by sheer happenstance the company commander stopped the company short of the ambush site and without knowing it went around the kill zones.

On the morning of 21 September, patrols by 11 Platoon of D Company near the south eastern part of the Courtenay rubber plantation found evidence that there were fortified bunker positions nearby. D Company moved forward near Núi Lé to investigate and discovered the bunker system of the 33rd Regiment's headquarters, the same enemy forces that had attacked the RF base on the 19th and had laid the trap for the ready reaction force on the 20th. D Company were caught by surprise and engaged in fierce fighting against 600 PAVN, without tanks and limited artillery support. The bunker system turned out to be the location of both the 33rd Regiment headquarters and its 2nd Battalion. Only three kilometers south west of D Company, B Company was ordered to assist but encountered significant numbers of enemy and endured savage mortar fire wounding 15 Australians before the enemy withdrew. B Company's priority became evacuating the wounded. From their location, V6 Company also encountered enemy action resulting in one member wounded from shrapnel in a contact. As the day turned to night fighting continued with 3rd Battalion, 33 Regiment also involved. D Company was pinned down by an extremely well-organized and trained enemy. American airstrikes and Australian artillery bought them some time, but what finally saved D Company was a last-ditch attempt by the Artillery Forward Observer to order Danger Close artillery rounds on their position. As the artillery rounds rained down, Colonel Thuong seeing this was forced to reconsider his position. Realising their intel was faulty and rather than risk the lives of his men, Thuong decided to pull out. After 14 hours of intense fighting the enemy disengaged.

Late in the afternoon of the following day D Company were reinforced by V6 Company in anticipation of a follow-up attack, but none came. On 23 September, V6 Company lead the final assault against the bunker, however when they arrived, the enemy had withdrawn.

The Battle of Nui Le resulted in six Australians from D Company killed and 30 wounded, and one New Zealander wounded. As a result of the battle, the 33rd Regiment withdrew from Phouc Tuy Province. Operation Ivanhoe concluded on 2 October.

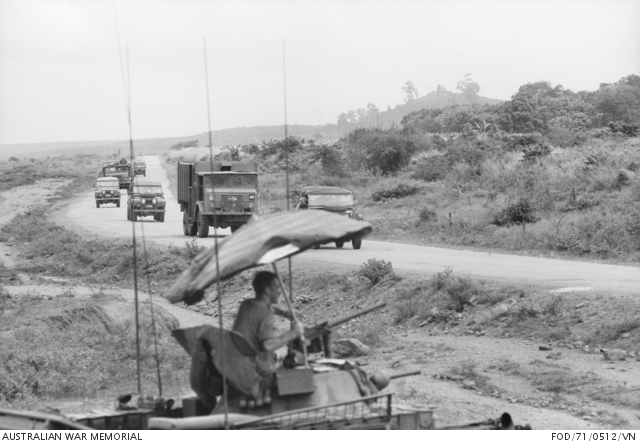
1 ATF units withdraw from Nui Dat to Vung Tau

With 3 RAR back at Nui Dat preparing to return to Australia, V6 Company's last combat operation was Operation Valiant (3-6 October 1971) which together with B Company 4 RAR, involved a sweeping action each side of Route 2 during the move back to Nui Dat from Courtenay Hill. D Company was already back at Nui Dat as the ready reaction force and C Company was airlifted back on 4 October. The move took from 3–6 October and resulted in one contact for V6 Company, which would be the last contact for the battalion and for 1 ATF.

With the battalion's tour cut short, Victor 6's last operation was one of protecting the activities of 1 ATF's withdrawal from South Vietnam during Operation Southward (6–16 October 1971). As the only 1ATF battalion left, 4 RAR/NZ was reinforced by some U.S. elements including artillery while they moved the South Vietnamese forces fully into the Nui Dat base.

The majority of 4 RAR/NZ withdrew from Nui Dat to Vũng Tàu on 7 November 1971.

The Australians departed Vietnam on 8 December followed by the New Zealanders on 9 December. D Company, 4 RAR, remained behind until 12 March 1972 in order to provide security to rear details.

The last Victor Company would suffer a total of 1 killed and 5 wounded during its tour in South Vietnam.

The very last RNZIR contribution to the Vietnam War was in March 1972, when the second New Zealand Army Training Team (2 NZATTV) arrived at the U.S. Dong Ba Thin Base Camp, near Cam Ranh Bay on the south-east coast. Made up of members from various New Zealand branches of service including RNZIR, the team helped train Khmer National Armed Forces (FANK) personnel in weapons and tactics and first aid.

By the end of 1972, Republic of Korea troops outnumbered American forces and were 60.5% of the Allied troops still operating in Vietnam. (ROK forces remained until 1973, following the Paris Peace Accords.)

The two New Zealand training teams were withdrawn from South Vietnam in December 1972.

Additionally, over the course of the war RNZIR personnel served in administrative roles at the New Zealand HQ V Force in Saigon, in support and logistic roles within the ANZAC Battalions at Nui Dat, and in the 1st Australian Logistics Support Group in Vung Tau. Some RNZIR personnel were attached to the long-serving Australian Army Training Team Vietnam (AATV.)

== Operations ==
As part of 1 ATF, New Zealand infantry participated in the following operations:

- Operation Wellington (May 1967)
  - V Coy shakedown operation
- Operation Paddington (8–16 July 1967)
  - V Coy with 2 RAR
- Operation Cairns (25 July – 1 August 1967)
  - V Coy with 2 RAR
- Operation Atherton (16 August – 3 September 1967)
  - V Coy with 2 RAR
- Operation Ainslie (4–21 September 1967)
  - V Coy with 7 RAR
- Operation Kenmore (29 September – 11 October 1967)
  - V Coy with 2 RAR
- Operation Lawley (22–23 December 1967)
  - W Coy first operation
- Operation Forrest (December 1967 – 5 January 1968)
  - V2 Coy with 2 RAR
- Operation Duntroon (10–21 January 1968)
  - V2 Coy with 2 RAR
- Operation Coburg (24 January – 14 February 1968)
  - V2 Coy with 2 RAR
- Operation Coburg (12–24 February 1968)
  - W Coy with 3 RAR
- Operation Oakleigh
  - V2 Coy with 2 RAR (15-16 February 1968)
- Operation Pinnaroo (27 February – 1 March 1968)
  - V2 Coy & W Coy with 2 RAR

As part of the newly formed ANZAC Battalion with 2 RAR, New Zealand infantry participated in:

- Operation Pinnaroo (1 March – 15 April 1968)
  - V2 Coy with 2 RAR
- Operation Pinnaroo (1-24 March 1968)
  - W Coy with 2 RAR
- Operation Ashgrove Tram (25–26 March 1968)
  - W Coy independent operation
- Operation Cooktown Orchid (April 1968)
  - W Coy with 1 AR, 3 Cav, 1 Fd Sqn RAE, 17 Con Sqn
- Operation Toan Thang I (25 April – 10 May 1968)
  - V2 Coy & W Coy with 2 RAR
- Operation Toolong (20–23 May 1968)
  - W Coy with C Coy, 2 RAR

As part of the next rotation of the ANZAC Battalion, with 4 RAR, New Zealand infantry participated in:

- Operation Kosciusko (15–20 June 1968)
  - V3 Coy with 4 RAR
- Operation Toan Thang II (23 June – 18 July 1968)
  - W Coy with 4 RAR
- Operation Merino (18–25 July 1968)
  - V3 Coy, W Coy with 4 RAR
- Operation Platypus (1-13 August 1968)
  - Security operation by V3 Coy, 1 AR
- Operation Lyre Bird (1–4 September 1968)
  - W Coy, 1 Fd Sqn RAE
- Operation Innamincka (7–12 September 1968)
  - W Coy, V3 Coy and 4 RAR
- Operation Hawkesbury (12–24 September 1968)
  - W Coy, V3 Coy with 4 RAR
- Operation Sceptre (28 September – 6 October 1968)
  - independent operation by W Coy
- Operation Stirrup Cup (3 October 1968)
  - independent operation by V3 Coy
- Operation Capitol (12–30 October 1968)
  - W Coy, V3 Coy with 4 RAR
- Operation Capital II (30 October – 30 November 1969)
  - V3 Coy with 4 RAR
- Operation Goodwood(31 December 1968 – 13 January 1969)
  - W2 Coy with 4 RAR
- Operation Goodwood, Phase II (27 January - 19 February 1969)
  - V3 Coy, W2 Coy with 4 RAR
- Operation Toan Thang (20-23 March 1969)
  - W2 Coy with 2/48 ARVN & 586 RF
- Operation Federal (19 February – 24 March 1969)
  - V3 Coy, W2 Coy with 4 RAR
- Operation Overlander (8–17 April 1969)
  - V3 Coy, W2 Coy with 4 RAR
- Operation Stafford (17 April – 1 May 1969)
  - V3 Coy, W2 Coy with 4 RAR

With the next ANZAC battalion, formed with 6 RAR, New Zealand infantry was involved in:

- Operation Lavarack (31 May – 30 June 1969)
  - W2 Coy, V4 Coy with 6 RAR
- Operation Waiouru (5–9 July 1969)
  - V4 Coy with 1 Fd Sqn RAE
- Operation Mundingburra (15 July – 14 August 1969)
  - W2 Coy, V4 Coy with 6 RAR
- Operation Tekapo (26–28 August 1969)
  - V4 Coy independent operation
- Operation Burnham (29 August – 30 September 1969)
  - W2 Coy, V4 Coy with 6 RAR
- Operation Ross (15–24 October 1969)
  - W2 Coy, V4 Coy with 6 RAR
- Operation With the ARVN (24–28 November 1969)
  - V4 Coy with 4/52 ARVN
- Operation Ross (...continuing 24–30 November 1969)
  - W3 Coy with 6 RAR
- Operation Marsden (1–27 December 1969)
  - W3 Coy, V4 Coy with 6 RAR
- Operation Bluewater (30 December 1969 – 1 January 1970)
  - W3 Coy with B & D Coys 6 RAR
- Operation Napier (10 January – 20 February 1970)
  - W3 Coy, V4 Coy with 6 RAR
- Operation Matilda (15-26 January 1970)
  - W3 Company mortar section, with B Coy 6 RAR
- Operation Horseshoe (16 February - 15 April 1970)
  - W3 Coy
- Operation Gisborne (28 February – 6 March 1970)
  - V4 Coy with 6 RAR
- Operation Waipounamu (18–20 March 1970)
  - V4 Coy independent operation
- Operation Townsville (20 March – 23 April 1970)
  - V4 Coy with 6 RAR (later joined by W3 Coy)
- Operation Long Son Island (4-14 May 1970 + 15–31 May 1970)
  - W3 Coy

As part of 2 RAR/NZ (ANZAC) Whisky 3 and Victor 5 Companies were involved in:

- Operation Ashfield (15–26 May 1970)
  - W3 Coy, less 2Pl and mortars, independent operation
- Operation Capricorn (26 May – 9 June 1970)
  - first new battalion operation with W3 Coy, V5 Coy and 2 RAR
- Operation Cung Chung I (12–28 June 1970)
  - V5 Coy with 2 RAR
- Operation Petrie / Operation Quartermile (29 June – 13 July 1970)
  - W3 Coy with 8 RAR
- Operation Nathan (13 July – 2 August 1970)
  - W3 Coy, V5 Coy, with 2 RAR
- Operation Cung Chung II (3 August – 20 September 1970)
  - W3 Coy, V5 Coy, with 2 RAR
- Operation Massey Harris (29 August – 18 September 1970)
  - W3 Mortar section, 1 ATF D&E Platoon, 3Cav, 1 Fd Sqn RAE
- Operation Cung Chung III (21 September 1970 – 31 January 1971)
  - W3 Coy, V5 Coy, with 2 RAR
- Operation Phoi Hop (1 February 1971 – 2 May 1971)
  - 2 RAR/NZ relieving 7 RAR

As part of 4 RAR/NZ (ANZAC) Victor 6 Company was involved in:

- Operation Overlord (5–14 June 1971)
- Operation Hermit Park (14 June – 27 July 1971)
- Operation Northward (5 August - 18 September 1971)
- Operation Ivanhoe (18 September - 2 October 1971)
- Operation Valiant (3–6 October 1971)
- Operation Southward (6–16 October 1971)

=== Casualties ===
RNZIR casualties (including RNZE attachments) during the Vietnam War were:

- V1 Coy: 1 KIA, 3 WIA
- W1 Coy: 3 KIA, 17 WIA
- V2 Coy: 1 KIA, 20 WIA
- V3 Coy: 2 KIA, 22 WIA
- W2 Coy: 7 KIA, 26 WIA
- V4 Coy: 1 KIA, 1 DOI, 14 WIA
- W3 Coy: 3 KIA, 13 WIA
- V5 Coy: 4 KIA, 27 WIA
- V6 Coy: 1 KIA, 5 WIA

== Bibliography ==
- 9th Battalion Royal Australian Regiment: Vietnam Tour of Duty 1968−1969: On Active Service. Enoggera, Queensland: 9 RAR Association. 1992. ISBN 0-646-10160-9.
- "AWM 95-1-4-140 Headquarters 1st Australian Task Force Commander's Diary Annexes E-N 1–29 February 1969" (PDF). Headquarters 1st Australian Task Force. Archived (PDF) from the original on 5 March 2016.
- Avery, Brian (2002). In the ANZAC Spirit: The Fourth Battalion, Royal Australian Regiment/NZ (ANZAC): South Vietnam 1968 to 1969. McCrae, Victoria: Slouch Hat Publications. ISBN 0-9579752-1-X.
- Davies, Bruce; McKay, Gary (2012). Vietnam: The Complete Story of the Australian War. Sydney: Allen & Unwin. ISBN 978-1741750287.
- Fairhead, Fred (2014). A Duty Done: A History of The Royal Australian Regiment in the Vietnam War (PDF). Linden Park, South Australia: The Royal Australian Regiment Association SA Inc. ISBN 978-0-9924704-0-1. Archived from the original (PDF) on 20 June 2014.
- Horner, David, ed. (2008). Duty First: A History of the Royal Australian Regiment (2nd ed.). Crows Nest, New South Wales: Allen & Unwin. ISBN 9781741753745.
- McGibbon, Ian (2010). New Zealand's Vietnam War: A History of Combat, Commitment and Controversy. New Zealand: Exisle Publishing. ISBN 978-0-908988-96-9.
- McNeill, Ian (1993). To Long Tan: The Australian Army and the Vietnam War 1950–1966. The Official History of Australia's Involvement in Southeast Asian Conflicts 1948–1975. Vol. II. St Leonards, New South Wales: Allen & Unwin. ISBN 1863732829.
- McNeill, Ian; Ekins, Ashley (2003). On the Offensive: The Australian Army and the Vietnam War 1967–1968. The Official History of Australia's Involvement in Southeast Asian Conflicts 1948–1975. Vol. Eight. St Leonards, New South Wales: Allen & Unwin. ISBN 1-86373-304-3.
- Starry, Donn. A (1978). Mounted Combat in Vietnam (PDF). Washington, D.C.: Department of the Army. ISBN 978-1-83931-084-3. Archived from the original (PDF) on 8 January 2015.
- Stuart, R.R. (1968). 3RAR in South Vietnam 1967–1968. Brookvale, New South Wales: Printcraft Press. OCLC 500218701.
- "Honour Roll of all New Zealanders wounded in action (WIA), killed in action (KIA) or died of wounds (DOW) in Vietnam" (PDF). Archived (PDF) from the original on 16 February 2021.
- Van Thai, Hoang; Van Quang, Tran, eds. (2002) [1988]. Victory in Vietnam: The Official History of the People's Army of Vietnam, 1954–1975. Translated by Pribbenow, Merle L. Lawrence, Kansas: University Press of Kansas. ISBN 978-0-7006-1175-1.
