= Long Hải Hills =

Hills in Bà Rịa–Vũng Tàu province, Vietnam

The Long Hải Hills are hills near Long Hải, in Long Điền District, Bà Rịa–Vũng Tàu province, Vietnam.

During the Vietnam War, the Long Hảis were a Viet Cong base area, known as Minh Dam secret zone. The VC D445 Battalion and VC C25 Long Đất District Company used the hills as a supply and staging area. The 1st Australian Task Force whose Tactical area of responsibility was Phuoc Tuy Province mounted many operations in and around the hills forcing D445 Battalion to eventually withdraw after Operation Hammersley in February, 1970. When Australian and New Zealand troops began to withdraw in 1971 D445 Battalion was able to regain strength by taking advantage of the reducing strength of anti-communist forces.

Today the hills are open to locals, school children, and tourists. Visitors can climb the hills and see the bunkers, tunnels, and ruins of the Vietcong stronghold. Two-thirds of the way up is a temple with a memorial that lists the names of all the Vietcong soldiers who died in battle.
