= Operation Hardihood =

Part of the Vietnam War (1966)

- Part of Vietnam War
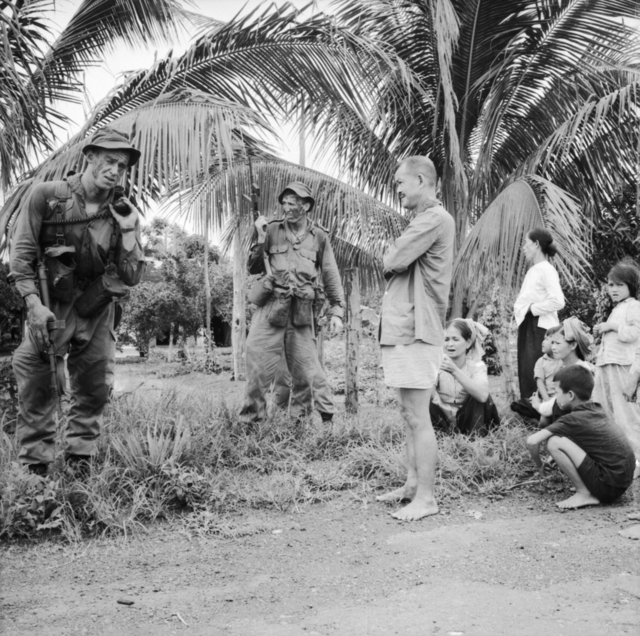
- 5RAR soldiers guard Vietnamese civilians
Date	16 May – 8 June 1966
Location	Phước Tuy Province, South Vietnam

Belligerents
United States; Australia	Viet Cong

Commanders and leaders
(United States) BG Paul F. Smith	

Units involved
(United States) 503rd Infantry Regiment (Australia) 1st Battalion, Royal Australian Regiment; 5th Battalion, Royal Australian Regiment	D445 Provincial Mobile Battalion

Casualties and losses
(United States) 23 killed (Australia) 5 killed	48 killed

Operation Hardihood was a security operation conducted from 16 May to 8 June 1966 during the Vietnam War by the U.S. 503rd Infantry Regiment, the 1st Battalion, Royal Australian Regiment (1RAR) and the 5th Battalion, Royal Australian Regiment (5 RAR) in Phước Tuy Province, South Vietnam to secure the area around Nui Dat for the establishment of a base area for the 1st Australian Task Force (1 ATF).

== Background ==
=== Military situation ===
On 8 March 1966 the Australian Government announced that 1 RAR would be replaced at the end of its tour by a two-battalion brigade—the 1st Australian Task Force, with armour, aviation, engineers and artillery support; in total 4,500 men. Additional Royal Australian Air Force (RAAF) and Royal Australian Navy elements would also be deployed, with total Australian strength in Vietnam planned to rise to 6,300. Meanwhile, 1 RAR's attachment to U.S. forces had highlighted the differences between Australian and American operational methods. The Americans relied on massed firepower and mobility in big-unit search and destroy operations as part of a war of attrition which often resulted in heavy casualties on both sides. Whereas the Australians, although not eschewing conventional operations, emphasised deliberate patrolling using dispersed companies supported by artillery, APCs and helicopters to separate the Viet Cong (VC) from the population in the villages, while slowly extending government control. Consequently, 1 ATF would be allocated its own Tactical Area of Responsibility (TAOR) in Phước Tuy Province, thereby allowing them to pursue operations more independently using their own methods.

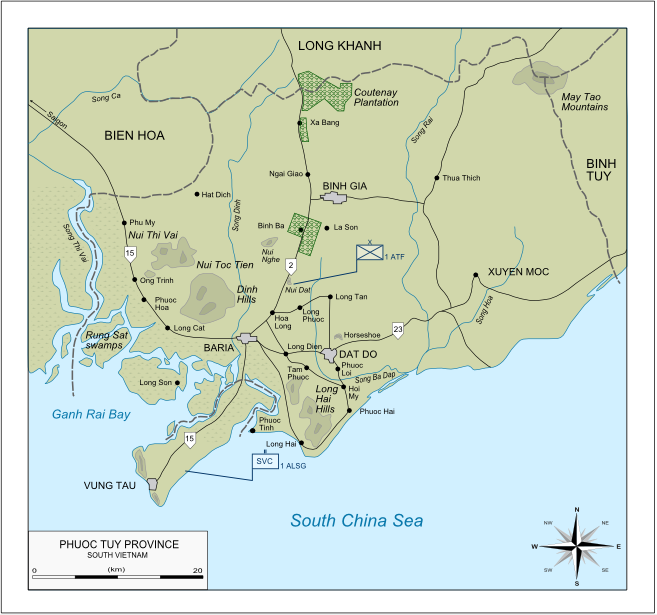
Phước Tuy Province, South Vietnam

By 1966 Phước Tuy Province was dominated by the VC. With forces dispersed across South Vietnam to defend against the growing insurgency, the Army of the Republic of Vietnam (ARVN) was stretched with only limited resources available to counter penetration of the province. Politically, Phước Tuy was controlled by the province chief, an ARVN officer appointed by the central government, and was divided into five districts, each with a district chief. Although the government controlled Bà Rịa and the Vũng Tàu Special Zone, it only partially controlled the village of Long Điền District, the western parts of Đất Đỏ District and the villages of Long Hải, Xuyên Mộc District and Phú Mỹ during the day. Only the route from Bà Rịa to Vũng Tàu was secure, and beyond this ARVN forces were likely to be ambushed. Although the mostly Catholic village of Bình Gia opposed VC influence, it was isolated with the VC controlling the remainder of the province, collecting taxes and subjecting the population to extortion and violent intimidation. The VC operated in parallel to the South Vietnamese administration. Part of the larger province of Ba Long—which also included Long Khánh Province and part of Biên Hòa Province, the Ba Long Province People's Committee co-ordinated activity in Phước Tuy under the direction of the Central Office for South Vietnam (COSVN), an organisation controlled by North Vietnam. Meanwhile, a network of cells and committees known as the Viet Cong Infrastructure provided support and extended control into the villages and hamlets. The military forces which supported the political apparatus consisted of main forces, local forces and guerrillas.

=== Geography ===
Located 40 kilometres (25 mi) south-east of Saigon, Phước Tuy Province lay on the coast between the mountains of southern central Vietnam and the alluvial plains of the Mekong Delta, dominating the approaches to Vũng Tàu and the main highway to the capital. Approximately 60 kilometres (37 mi) east to west and 35 kilometres (22 mi) north to south, it was roughly rectangular. Mostly flat, it gradually sloped north, while the Nui Thi Vai, Mây Tào and Long Hải mountains rose in the south-west, north-east and south. The province was bounded to the north by Biên Hòa, Long Khánh, and Bình Tuy Provinces, and to the south-east by the South China Sea. Separate administratively, the Vũng Tàu peninsula projected south, with the city of Vũng Tàu at its tip containing a shallow water port of strategic importance due to its capacity to relieve congestion on the Saigon River. Phước Tuy was bisected by Route 2 running north to the provincial capital of Bà Rịa, while Route 15 ran north-west linking Vũng Tàu to Saigon and was the main supply route for the movement of stores landed at the port, and Route 23 ran east from Bà Rịa. With just a quarter of the province used for agriculture, it supported a modest population of 104,636, most of which was concentrated in the south-west in approximately 30 villages and 100 hamlets, with major settlements at Bà Rịa, Long Điền, Đất Đỏ, Bình Gia and Xuyên Mộc. The majority were Vietnamese, while there were small numbers of Chinese, Montagnards, Cambodians and French. Two-thirds were Buddhist, while the remainder were Catholic. Most lived in poverty as farmers, fishermen, labourers, merchants or mechanics. Rice growing was the main industry, while fruit and vegetables were also cultivated, and coastal fishing was extensive. Charcoal kilns, sawmills, salt evaporation ponds and rubber plantations also provided employment.

Geographically the province was ideal for guerrilla warfare, consisting of flat, open farmland and rice fields with numerous villages and small settlements, a long and mostly uninhabited coastline aside from the port of Vũng Tàu and the fishing villages of Phước Hải and Long Hải, and a region of mangrove swamp and waterways in the south-west known as the Rung Sat, both of which aided infiltration. Meanwhile, isolated and densely vegetated mountains provided supply routes and base areas. Rainforest, thick scrub and grassland covered almost three-quarters of the province, in places restricting movement of tracked and wheeled vehicles, limiting visibility to close range and providing extensive concealment. In the lowlands the vegetation provided little obstacle to either mounted or dismounted movement, although a number of watercourses and streams were difficult to traverse, particularly during the wet season, with four major rivers flowing north to south, being the Song Hoa, Song Rai, Song Ba Dap and Song Dinh. Phước Tuy had a tropical climate, with the monsoon lasting from mid-May to the end of October, which resulted in several hours of heavy rain up to twice a day, while the dry season lasted from October to May. The VC and their predecessors, the Viet Minh, had dominated Phước Tuy since 1945. As a consequence, the local population had a long tradition of resistance to the former French colonial administration, while revolutionary elements later challenged repeated attempts by the ARVN to bring the province under control of the central government in Saigon. By comparison Vũng Tàu was largely free from VC activity and several large allied military installations had been established there. A popular seaside resort with many bars and nightclubs, it was rumoured to have been used as a rest centre by both Allied and VC soldiers.

== Planning ==
Phước Tuy had been selected by the Australians because it was an area of significant VC activity, was located away from the Cambodian border, could be resupplied and, if necessary, evacuated by sea, and enabled them to concentrate their efforts in a single area to achieve greater national recognition. Rather than being attached to a U.S. division, negotiations between senior Australian and U.S. commanders ensured 1 ATF would be an independent command under the operational control of II Field Force, Vietnam (II FFV), a corps-level headquarters at Long Binh Post, Biên Hòa which reported directly to COMUSMACV. This would allow the force greater freedom of action and the chance to demonstrate the Australian Army's evolving concept for counter-insurgency warfare, developed in part from its operations during the Malayan Emergency. 1ATF would be commanded by Brigadier David Jackson, an experienced infantry officer who had served in the Middle East and New Guinea during the Second World War and later in Korea, and commanded the Australian Army Training Team Vietnam and Australian Army Force Vietnam prior to taking up the appointment. With the new force given less than two months to deploy, hasty preparations began in Australia to ready it.

1 ATF was tasked with dominating its TAOR and conducting operations throughout Phước Tuy as required, as well as deploying anywhere in III Corps and neighbouring Bình Tuy in II Corps as required. Its principal objective was to secure Route 15 for military movement to ensure allied control of the port at Vũng Tàu, while politically it sought to extend government authority in Phước Tuy. The task force would be based in a rubber plantation at Nui Dat, 8 kilometres (5.0 mi) north of Bà Rịa, while a logistics base would be established in Vũng Tàu with a direct link forward via road. Situated on Route 2, Nui Dat's central position offered short lines of communication, was close but not adjacent to the main population centres, and would allow 1 ATF to disrupt VC activity in the area. Astride a major transit and resupply route, it was close to a VC base area yet near enough to Bà Rịa to afford security to the provincial capital and facilitate liaison with the local authorities. Australian doctrine emphasised establishing a base and spreading influence outwards to separate the guerrillas from the population. By lodging at Nui Dat they aimed to form a permanent presence between the VC and the inhabitants. 1 ATF would then focus on destroying VC forces in the province, while security of the towns and villages remained a South Vietnamese responsibility. Nui Dat would be occupied in three phases. Firstly, the province chief would remove the inhabitants around the base to create a security zone. Secondly, the 503rd Infantry Regiment would secure the area with 5th Battalion, Royal Australian Regiment (5 RAR), following its deployment. Finally, the main body would move forward after acclimatisation and training at Vung Tau. 1ATF began arriving at Vũng Tàu between April and June 1966.

== Operation ==
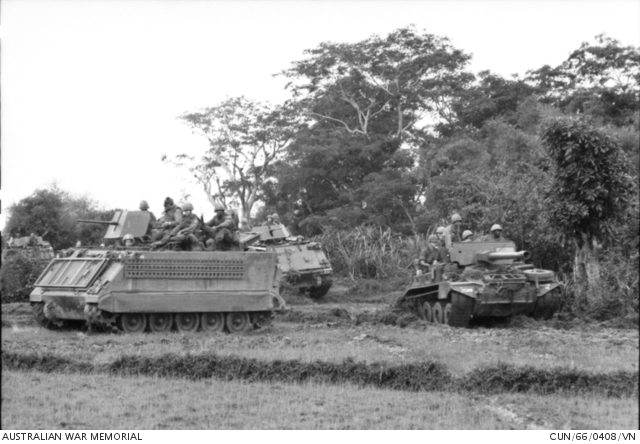
Australian M113s and U.S. M56 Scorpion during the operation

On 16 May the 1/503rd Infantry moved by road from its base at Long Binh to Bà Rịa and began operations around the village of Long Phước. On 17 May While the 1/503rd established blocking positions around the village, ARVN forces moved in to sweep the area meeting strong resistance from a company from the VC D445 Provincial Mobile Battalion in an extensive tunnel and bunker system. One company of the 1/503rd Infantry lost 12 killed and 35 wounded during the clash, while VC losses were 16 killed. The clearance of the fortified village of Long Phước began two days later.

On 22 May the 2/503rd Infantry was deployed by helicopter to Nui Dat. Within the planned security zone, the 3,000 inhabitants were relocated following heavy fighting between two companies from D445 Battalion and the 2/503rd Infantry and ARVN. By 24 May the clearance was complete with VC casualties of 18 dead and a further 45 estimated killed.

On 23 May the 1st Regiment, Royal Australian Artillery moved by road from Long Binh to Phước Tuy.

On 24 May 5 RAR was moved by helicopter from Vũng Tàu to Nui Dat the same day and was tasked with clearing any VC in an area 6,000 metres (6,600 yd) east and north-east of Nui Dat.

1 ATF occupied Nui Dat from 5 June, with Jackson flying-in with his tactical headquarters to take command.

== Aftermath ==
=== Casualties ===
The operation concluded on 8 June with US claiming that the VC losses totaled 48 killed, while five Australians were killed and 15 wounded. Among the dead was Private Errol Noack, a National Serviceman accidentally shot on the first day of the operation—the first killed during the war. Total U.S. losses were 23 killed and 160 wounded. 1 RAR returned to Australia in early June 1966, having completed 13 major operations attached to U.S. forces for the loss of 19 killed and 114 wounded.

=== Establishment of Nui Dat base ===
The plan to operate independently resulted in significant self-protection requirements and 1 ATF's initial priorities were to establish a base and ensure its own security. Meanwhile, the decision to occupy Nui Dat rather than co-locate 1 ATF with its logistic support at Vũng Tàu allowed the task force to have a greater impact but resulted in additional manpower demands to secure the base. Indeed, the security needs of an understrength brigade in an area of strong VC activity utilised up to half the force, limiting its freedom of action. Jackson was uneasy about the possibility of a concentration against Nui Dat, fearing a major military and political setback if they succeeded in attacking 1 ATF soon after its arrival and caused heavy casualties. He subsequently moved to construct fixed defences and secure the supply route to Vũng Tàu, as well as implementing a high-tempo patrol program. Although hampered by the monsoon, defensive positions were dug, command posts sandbagged, and living areas built, while claymore mines, concertina wire and other obstacles were laid, and the vegetation cleared out to small arms range. Standing patrols were established outside the base in the evening and clearing patrols sent out every morning and evening along the 12-kilometre (7.5 mi) perimeter. Daily platoon patrols and ambushes were initially conducted out to Line Alpha 4,000 metres (4,400 yd), which was the range of the VC mortars, but were later extended to Line Bravo 10,000 metres (11,000 yd) to counter the threat from artillery.

As part of the occupation all inhabitants of Long Phước and Long Hải villages within Lina Alpha were removed and resettled nearby. A protective security zone was then established and a free-fire zone declared. Although unusual for allied installations in Vietnam, many of which were located near populated areas, the Australians hoped to deny the VC observation of Nui Dat and afford greater security to patrols entering and exiting the area. Yet while adding to the physical security of the base, disrupting a major VC support area and removing the local population from danger, such measures may have been counter-productive. Indeed, the resettlement resulted in widespread resentment and it was debatable how much information the inhabitants would provide on VC movements, potentially creating an opportunity to attack Nui Dat without warning. Meanwhile, the VC continued to observe the base from the Nui Dinh hills. Movement was heard around the perimeter over the first few nights as they attempted to locate the Australian defences under the cover of darkness and heavy rain. Although no clashes occurred and the reconnaissance soon ceased, they were believed to be finalising preparations for an attack. On 10 June reporting indicated a VC regiment was moving towards Nui Dat from the north-west and was about 10 kilometres (6.2 mi) away. The same day three 120 mm mortar rounds landed just outside the base. That night Australian artillery fired on suspected movement along Route 2, although no casualties were found the next day. Further warnings of a four-battalion attack hastened the call-forward of the 6th Battalion, Royal Australian Regiment (6 RAR), which arrived from Vũng Tàu on 14 June. Despite such reports though no attack occurred, and the initial reaction to 1 ATF's lodgement proved unexpectedly limited.
