= Battle of Ba Ria =

- Part of the Vietnam War, Tet Offensive
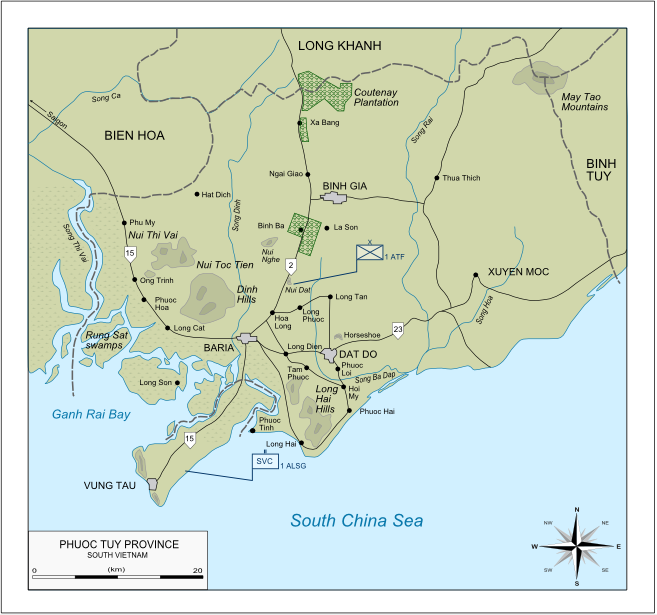
- Map of Phuoc Tuy Province: The battle occurred at Ba Ria, near the centre of the map
Date	January 31 to February 7, 1968
Location	Bà Rịa, Phuoc Tuy Province, South Vietnam
Result	Allied victory

Belligerents
Viet Cong	Australia; South Vietnam; New Zealand; United States

Units involved
445th Local Force Battalion	(Australia) 3 RAR (South Vietnam) ARVN Rangers

Strength
600 men	Unknown

Casualties and losses
260 casualties (from January 31st to February 1); 1 captured	21 dead 100 wounded

The Battle of Bà Rịa took place from January 31 to February 7, 1968 in Phước Tuy province, South Vietnam. It occurred as part of the Tet Offensive, with large formations of Viet Cong troops attacking allied forces consisting of South Vietnamese, Australian and American troops. The Australians engaged in the heaviest street fighting seen by any of their units during the war, and the attack was defeated with heavy casualties inflicted on the VC.

== Battle ==
At 5:00 on the morning of 1 February 1968 heavily armed members of the Viet Cong's D445 Provincial Battalion began entering Bà Rịa, quickly occupying the main buildings. Two companies attacked the American Administration and Logistics Compound, 140 men attacked a different US complex and police station, while another platoon occupied the hospital, Catholic church and town theatre. The VC also occupied bungalows housing the US Provincial Aid Organisation, a CIA office and Van Kiep Airfield east of Ba Ria. By dawn the National Liberation Front flag was flying over the town and key installations had either been neutralised or isolated.

In response, 3RAR’s A Company boarded A Squadron, 3rd Cavalry Regiment's armoured personnel carriers at 8am and left Nui Dat for Ba Ria. The 1st ATF Tactical Headquarters were informed of only two VC platoons, so they dispatched only a Ready Reaction Force of two platoons belonging from A Company (about 65 men). As they approached the town three hours after the initial assault, the Australians came under small arms fire, and as the infantry left their APCs to advance towards Hoa Long village, faced rocket propelled grenades explosions mixed with rifle and machine gun bullets.

Over the next 24 hours, infantrymen, with the support of the APCs and United States Air Force Phantom jets, engaged in house to house fighting, slowly driving the Viet Cong from well-prepared strongholds. Despite being hit by sniper fire, the APCs surged southward past the sector headquarters and to the bungalows, where they rescued three civilian aid workers and then the CIA representative with his Nùng soldiers at a loss of 2 APCs and 10 wounded (6 Australians, 4 Nungs). Simultaneously, the ARVN deployed reinforcements by helicopter from the recaptured Van Kiep Airfield, while air support was called in to force the VC out of several blockhouses, with 45 being killed.

Meanwhile, one helicopter pilot braved heavy fire three times to retrieve seriously injured men from the town square while the APCs gave accurate machine gun fire and evacuated the wounded. While 2 Platoon successfully rescued three American advisors who were in Ba Ria when the Viet Cong came, two Americans and an Australian were less fortunate when they, along with 3RAR's 2 Platoon tried to rescue another American. They were killed, with the carrier troop commander and an Australian soldier wounded. While reinforcing APCs were towing the knocked out APCs, the force was attacked from the southwest, with one carrier being hit by a Rocket-propelled grenade, killing the CIA man, 4 Nungs and an Australian advisor who had been rescued. 2 Platoon was isolated, and fended off attacks with grenades. Only after a failed attempt by South Vietnamese forces, an airstrike by F-100 Super Sabres, and the appearance of 3 Platoon were they relieved.

By the time B Company arrived in Ba Ria on the afternoon of 2 February, the fight had ended. The Viet Cong fled the town during the night, others were killed or withdrew after a series of airstrikes and further pressure from 3RAR. Throughout the battle the Australians had been supported by New Zealand troops, with 161 Battery of the Royal New Zealand Army firing 500 shells during the night to prevent further attacks.

== Aftermath ==
After the initial victory, 3RAR returned to Ba Ria on February 7 in response to further Viet Cong raids on the town. D Company was sent to secure the western approaches where they spent an incident-free night in defensive positions. The next morning the Australians moved to help ARVN troops clear the Viet Cong from nearby Long Dien. After seeing a South Vietnamese battalion withdraw under fire, some of them in panic, B Company experienced sporadic contacts and were subject to sniper fire but held their position. While neighboring platoons weathered the Viet Cong's intermittent fire, 5 Platoon experienced a violent contact when they were ordered to rescue a South Vietnamese officer and an American adviser who had become separated from their unit during its withdrawal earlier in the day. After 4 Platoon joined the assault the situation stabilised, but the Vietnamese officer had already been killed as had three of the Australians. After this victory, the 3rd Battalion was transferred to FSB Andersen near Bien Hoa.
