= D445 Battalion =

445th Battalion
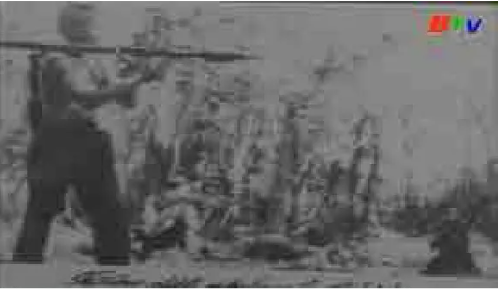
- A Vietcong soldier from the D445 Battalion firing an RPG-2.
- Allegiance: Viet Cong
- Branch: National Liberation Front for Southern Vietnam
- Type: Infantry
- Role: Guerilla
- Size: 380 men
- Engagements: Vietnam War: Battle of Long Tan; Battle of Ap My An; Battle of Hat Dich; Battle of Long Khanh; Battle of Ba Ria

The 445th Battalion (D445 for short), also known as the D445 Provincial Mobile Battalion or the Ba Ria Battalion, was a local force battalion of the Viet Cong (VC) during the Vietnam War.

== History ==
The battalion operated in the Dong Nai river basin and also the Bien Hoa, Phuoc Tuy and Long Khanh provinces. It recruited principally from Dat Do, Long Dien and Hoa Long. The battalion was formed on 19 May 1965. It consisted of three rifle companies and one weapons company with a total strength of approximately 350 men and was commanded by Bui Quang Chanh a.k.a. Sau Chanh. (Note: 1 ATF intelligence believed Sau Chanh commanded the battalion in August 1966; however, following interviews with former PAVN officers in 1988, the Australian official historian concluded Nguyen Van Kiem had done so. Yet according to the D445 Battalion history published in 1991, Chanh was, in fact, the unit's first commander, while Kiem commanded the Chau Duc District Company during Long Tan and only took over the battalion in early 1968.) The battalion fought initially against the 173rd Airborne Brigade between 24 May and 4 June 1966 during Operation Hardihood. American casualties during that operation were 23 killed and 160 wounded and 48 VC soldiers were reported to have been killed.

During the Battle of Long Tan on 18 August 1966 the battalion fought against Australian Army forces from D Company, 6 RAR supported by New Zealand and US artillery. According to the D445 Battalion political officer, the unit provided "guides for the units that mortared the Task Force" at Nui Dat base on 17 August 1966. A VC medic, Chung, reported that three of the VC RCL detachment were killed in the Australian counter-battery fire and were buried nearby. During the battle, D445 Battalion supported the VC 275th Regiment, which included a People's Army of Vietnam (PAVN) battalion, by attempting to outflank the Australians to the south. Meanwhile, an 80-strong Vo Thi Sau civil labour company commanded by Chin Phuong, comprising mainly women and children, lent support by evacuating the casualties. Australian veterans and historians, in the main, claim that at Long Tan D445 Battalion suffered heavy casualties, with captured personnel reportedly later stating that D445 Battalion's casualties had been 70 killed and 100 wounded, or approximately 50 percent of its strength. The total number of PAVN/VC dead in the battle, according to VC and PAVN histories were 47 killed. Only one member of D445 was captured at Long Tan (reportedly a 57 mm RCL gunner); and two members of 275th Regiment were captured who declared themselves to be members of "Doan 45" as their cover story.

During the retreat, Nguyen Duc Thu, the commander of D445's rear guard force, was seriously wounded by a bullet that passed through one ear lobe and went out the other and Tran Van Chien, and the commander of the 1st Company were killed. Several D445 soldiers were awarded Letters of Appreciation (Giay Khen) for their actions in the battle at Long Tan including Dao Van Trung (section 2IC 2nd Company), Tran Van Tranh (section 2IC 2nd Company), Pham Van Duong (2nd Company). One Australian M113 Armoured Personnel Carrier was hit by two rounds from a D445 recoilless rifle detachment, killing the driver and wounding the crew commander and several soldiers. However, VC casualty figures of Long Tan were always difficult to account for as the battlefield was continuously bombarded by the New Zealand and US artillery during the fighting and in the aftermath hundreds of VC fighters could never be identified. D445 Battalion and the main combat force from the 275th Regiment that attacked the Australians numbered some 2,500 fighters.

In 1968 a second local force unit was formed in Phuoc Tuy, known as the D440 Battalion. The unit generally performed poorly against Australian and New Zealand forces however, and was eventually disbanded in August 1970 with most of its personnel transferred to D445 Battalion.

Until 1971 D445 Battalion would fight mainly with the Australian and New Zealand forces operating in Phuoc Tuy Province from their base at Nui Dat. A major loss to the battalion was the discovery and destruction of the Mây Tào Mountain Base in Nui Mây Tào, including the battalion's field hospital and pharmacy in December 1969. When Australian troops began to withdraw in 1971 D445 Battalion was able to regain strength by taking advantage of the reducing strength of anti-communist forces. By mid 1971 the 1st Australian Task Force had been reduced to just two battalions and support arms: 3rd Battalion, Royal Australian Regiment, and a combined Australian and New Zealand battalion consisting of 4th Battalion, Royal Australian Regiment and Victor Company, Royal New Zealand Infantry Regiment. Australian and New Zealand combat forces were withdrawn in December 1971.

In September 1979, the battalion was involved in operations against armed FULRO guerrillas in the Chua Chan Mountain/La Nga River area of Xuân Lộc District that were seeking independence for ethnic minorities in Vietnam and Cambodia.

On 23 February 2011, at a formal meeting to discuss arrangements for a memorial for D445 by surviving veterans and government officials, it was stated that during the war the battalion "had wiped out more than 10,000 enemy soldiers, destroyed 120 military vehicles, shot down 20 aircraft, and seized more than 1,800 weapons of different types. More than 1,000 cadre and soldiers of the battalion had heroically sacrificed themselves."

== Notes ==
Footnotes

Citations
