= 1st Australian Support Compound =

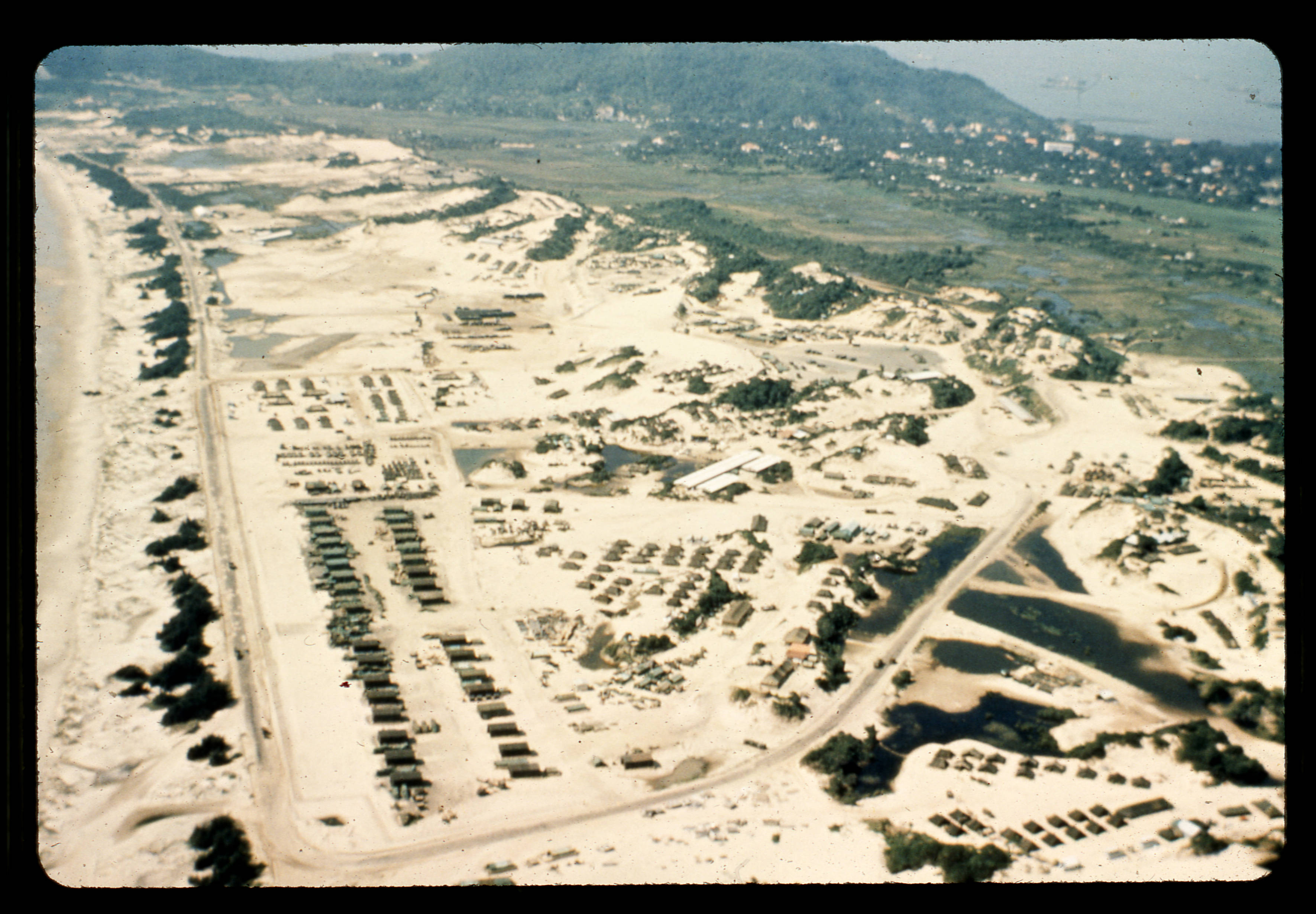
- Base on 3 November 1966

Site information
- Controlled by: 1st Australian Logistic Support Group

Location
- Coordinates: 10.366°N 107.110°E

Site history
- Built: 1966
- In use: 1966–1972
- Battles/wars: Vietnam War

1st Australian Support Compound was a complex of logistics and support bases operated by the 1st Australian Logistic Support Group in Vũng Tàu, Phước Tuy Province, South Vietnam during the Vietnam War.

== History ==
The base was located on the beach in Vũng Tàu, southeast of Vung Tau Airport.

In early 1966 with the expansion of the Australian military commitment in South Vietnam and the formation of the 1st Australian Task Force (1 ATF) it was decided that 1 ATF would be allocated its own Tactical Area of Responsibility (TAOR) in Phước Tuy Province, allowing them to pursue operations more independently using their own methods.

The Australian Logistic Support Company originally formed to support the 1st Battalion, Royal Australian Regiment, was redesignated as the 1st Australian Logistic Support Group (1 ALSG) in April 1966.

In June 1966 1 ALSG moved by road from Biên Hòa to Vũng Tàu, 45 minutes drive southwest of the main 1 ATF base at Nui Dat. The separation of the operational and logistics bases was dictated by the need for 1 ATF to be located further forward in its TAOR, while the logistics base required port and airfield access. The United States Army's 53rd General Support Group already had established operations at Vũng Tàu. With limited land available 1 ALSG occupied a stretch of sand dunes east of the town and airport, described by 1 ALSG commander Lieutenant Colonel David Rouse as an area "in which no sane person would ever stay on for more than a couple of hours in his right mind." The sand dunes were flattened and swamps filled to allow for the construction of logistics areas and accommodation, initially tents later replaced by more permanent huts, but the base remained a fairly desolate place.

At its peak the base was occupied by approximately 1,500 Australian and New Zealand troops and more than 500 South Vietnamese employees.

1 ALSG finally withdrew from the base on 12 March 1972.

=== Field Hospital ===
The 2nd Field Ambulance established a hospital within the base. In 1967 8th Field Ambulance replaced 2nd Field Ambulance. On 1 April 1968 the 1st Australian Field Hospital was established at the base and 8th Field Ambulance moved forward to Nui Dat. The 100 bed hospital was the main facility supporting 1 ATF, while the nearby U.S. 36th Evacuation Hospital was available to provide specialist services.

=== Peter Badcoe Club ===
Within the compound was the Peter Badcoe Club, the 1 ATF in-country rest and recreation centre, named for Peter Badcoe, posthumous recipient of the Victoria Cross. Facilities included the Harold Holt memorial swimming pool, a bar area and the Kevin Wheatley Stadium named for Kevin Wheatley, another posthumous recipient of the Victoria Cross. Beach recreation facilities included surfboards, speedboats and yachts.

== Current use ==
The area has largely been turned over to housing, commercial buildings and a golf course.
