= Tactical area of responsibility =

Prescribed area in a theatre of combat

A tactical area of responsibility (TAOR) is a prescribed area in a theatre of combat which has been assigned to a unit commander who is responsible for, and has the authority to act on, the development and maintenance of installations and the conduct of tactical operations, area defence, coordination of support, and for conducting patrols. The TAOR can be as large as divisional or as small as a platoon's in size.

A modern mechanised infantry division can have a TAOR of as much as 200 km in width of front, and 120 km in depth. By comparison the entire Battle of Waterloo was fought on a relatively short front at two and a half miles (4.0 km).
