= Stuart Paul Weir =

Australian Army officer

- Weir (right) consulting a map of the 1 RAR area of operations in Malaya, 1960
- Born: 29 December 1922; Canterbury, Victoria
- Died: 3 December 2004 (aged 81); Buderim, Queensland
- Military career
- Allegiance: Australia
- Branch: Australian Army
- Service years: 1938–1971
- Rank: Brigadier
- Commands: 1st Australian Task Force (1969–70); 1st Division (1969); 1st Battalion, Royal Australian Regiment (1960–61)
- Conflicts: Second World War; Korean War; Malayan Emergency; Vietnam War
- Awards: Distinguished Service Order; Military Cross

Brigadier Stuart Paul Weir, DSO, MC (29 December 1922 – 3 December 2004) was a senior officer in the Australian Army, seeing service during the Second World War, Korean War, the Malayan Emergency and the Vietnam War. He subsequently commanded the 1st Australian Task Force in South Vietnam in 1969–70.

== Early life ==
Born on 29 December 1922 in Canterbury, Victoria, the son of a manager of the Colonial Sugar Refining Company, Weir spent his childhood in Fiji. He was subsequently educated at Camberwell Grammar School in Melbourne, Victoria. After joining the Australian Army in 1938 he graduated from the Royal Military College, Duntroon as a lieutenant in the infantry in June 1942 at the age of 20.

== Military career ==
Transferring to the Second Australian Imperial Force (AIF), Weir subsequently served in New Guinea during the Second World War. Weir married Loloma Green of Richmond in 1944; the daughter of a missionary, Green had also grown up in Fiji and the couple later had a son, Tony. Weir was later awarded the Military Cross for his actions as a platoon commander in the 2/3rd Battalion fighting against the Japanese near Wewak in February 1945.

A regular officer, Weir continued to serve in the post-war Interim Army. As a captain he was posted to Army Headquarters before being discharged from the AIF in 1948 following the establishment of the Australian Regular Army. As a major Weir commanded a company of the 1st Battalion, Royal Australian Regiment (1 RAR) against Chinese forces in Korea in 1952–53, before holding instructional positions at Duntroon, the Staff College at Queenscliff and the UK Staff College, Camberley. He went on to command 1 RAR during counter-insurgency operations in the Malayan Emergency in 1960–61. Promoted to colonel in 1964 he was appointed deputy director of Military Operations and Plans at Army Headquarters in Canberra, a position he held until 1967. From January to August 1969 he served as acting commander of the 1st Division in Sydney, as a brigadier.

Weir took over as Commander 1st Australian Task Force (1 ATF) in South Vietnam on 1 September 1969. Believing that 1 ATF's primary role was to find and destroy Viet Cong main force concentrations and bases in the remote areas of the province, he moved away from the population protection operations of his predecessor and returned to earlier tactics which saw attrition of communist forces as paramount. Reflecting his aggressive approach, during his tenure the Australians conducted 21 major operations. These operations proved effective and the Viet Cong were unable to mount a major offensive in Phuoc Tuy Province during this time. Meanwhile, following signs that the main forces had left the province Weir pursued the local forces. By early 1970 the Viet Cong 274th Regiment in the Hat Dich no longer posed a threat to the task force, while D440 and D445 Provincial Mobile Battalions were reported to have left the province. After nine-months in command Weir handed over to Brigadier William Henderson on 31 May 1970.

== Retirement and later life ==
Shortly after returning to Australia he suffered a heart attack and was medically retired from the Army in 1971. He was later awarded the Distinguished Service Order for his command in Vietnam. Weir subsequently settled in Buderim, Queensland, with his wife, and in his later years enjoyed golf, historical research, gardening, painting and writing. He died on 3 December 2004.

== Notes ==
Military offices
Preceded by Major General Kenneth Mackay	Acting Commander 1st Division; January–August 1969	Succeeded by Major General Sandy Pearson
