= 33rd Regiment (People's Army of Vietnam) =

PAVN military unit

- Allegiance: North Vietnam
- Branch: People's Army of Vietnam
- Role: Infantry
- Engagements: Vietnam War

The 33rd Regiment was a People's Army of Vietnam (PAVN) regiment that served during the Vietnam War.

== History ==
The regiment or elements participated in the famous battles of Ia Drang and Plei Me in the Central Highlands in 1965 against US forces, attacked Buon Me Thuot during the 1968 Tet Offensive, and fought against Australian and New Zealand forces in Phuoc Tuy Province at Binh Ba, Long Khanh and Nui Le, as well as a number of other actions. In the South, the 33rd Regiment was subordinate to the 304th Division/B3 Front in the Central Highlands, and later under Military Region 7 and the 5th Division in Bien Hoa, Long Khanh and Phuoc Tuy Province, and its strength averaged about 1,300 men.

On 3 July 1969, Company D 2nd Battalion 3rd Infantry Regiment located a base camp of the regiment 12 miles (19 km) southwest of Xuân Lộc. Elements of the regiment defended the camp killing nine Americans before withdrawing with unknown casualties. Corporal Michael Fleming Folland smothered a PAVN hand grenade with his body and was later posthumously awarded the Medal of Honor. The base comprised over 50 bunkers linked by tunnels. Among the items captured were 200 Rocket-propelled grenades, two 82mm mortars, one 60mm mortar, two AK-47s and 12,000 AK-47 rounds.

In late 1971 the 33rd Regiment, under the command of Colonel Nguyen Van Thuong, staged a major incursion into Phước Tuy Province which was the Tactical area of responsibility of the 1st Australian Task Force. Acting on intelligence obtained from Viet Cong spies, the North Vietnamese believed that the Australian artillery had been sent back to Australia. It was true that the Task Force's tank troops had returned to Australia in August and Australian and New Zealand forces had been reduced in anticipation of a withdrawal, but artillery had not left. Thoung planned to stage incidents and ambushes to bait and lure the Australians from their base at Nui Dat and progressively annihilate them with his superior numbers. The first few attempts to lure 1ATF into ambushes were not successful. In what would be the last battle for Australian and New Zealand forces in Vietnam the Battle of Nui Le took place between the 20th and 22 September, against the 33rd Regiment's second and third battalion, some 1,100 men. Companies from the combined Australian and New Zealand "ANZAC Battalion" encountered the heavily armed forces of the 33rd Regiment in the area of Nui Le where the 33rd Regiment's new base had been established. Heavy fighting commenced on the 21st of September. However, with artillery fire being brought in from nearby Australian and U.S firebases, Colonel Thuong realized that their intelligence was wrong. When the Australian artillery Forward observer from D Company which had been routed by Thuong's forces ordered Danger Close rounds in a last-ditch attempt to avoid being overrun, Colonel Thuong was forced to weigh up and reconsider his position and decided to pull out. As a result of the battle, the 33rd Regiment withdrew permanently from Phouc Tuy Province.

A 33rd Regiment memorial near Binh Ba lists 2,100 killed in the war, (Note: In fact the 33rd Regiment history published in mid-2016 lists 3,050 of its soldiers killed in the South, and a further 500 killed in Cambodia after 1975.) out of an estimated 4,000 Vietnamese killed in two provinces occupied by forces of the 1st Australian Task Force from 1966 to 1972. Dr Bob Hall, a former infantry officer and Vietnam veteran who heads Operation Wandering Souls that aims to identify all Vietnamese soldiers killed in clashes with 1ATF forces, has so far identified 3,009 burial sites and has passed on the names of over 600 Vietnamese soldiers believed to be buried there.

== Notes ==
Footnotes

Citations
