= Battle of Long Khánh =

1971 Vietnam War military engagement

Battle of Long Khanh
- Part of the Vietnam War
- Australian Centurion tank, Operation Overlord June 1971
Date	6–7 June 1971
Location	Long Khanh Province, South Vietnam (now eastern Dong Nai Province, Vietnam) 10°47′N 107°16′E
Result	See Aftermath

Belligerents
Australia; New Zealand; United States	Viet Cong; North Vietnam

Commanders and leaders
(Australia) Peter Scott	

Units involved
(Australia) 1 ATF: 3 RAR; 4 RAR/NZ (ANZAC)	D445 Battalion (North Vietnam) 3/33 Regiment

Strength
Two infantry battalions Armour and artillery	ANZAC claim: Two infantry battalions

Casualties and losses
ANZAC claim: 3 killed 6 wounded 1 helicopter shot down	5+ killed

The Battle of Long Khanh (Vietnamese: Trận Long Khánh; 6–7 June 1971) was fought during the Vietnam War between elements of 1st Australian Task Force (1 ATF) and the Viet Cong (VC) and People's Army of Vietnam (PAVN) during Operation Overlord. The fighting saw Australian infantry from 3rd Battalion, Royal Australian Regiment (3 RAR) attack a heavily fortified communist base camp in Long Khanh Province, while Centurion tanks providing close support crushed many bunkers and their occupants. Regardless, the VC fought hard to delay the Australian advance and although the bunker system was subsequently captured, along with a second system further south, the Australians suffered a number of casualties and the loss of a UH-1 Iroquois helicopter. With the Australians unable to concentrate sufficient combat power to achieve a decisive result, the bulk of the VC/PAVN force successfully withdrew intact, although they probably sustained heavy casualties in the process.

== Background ==
As a consequence of the overall allied strategy of Vietnamization and with the Australian government keen to reduce its own commitment to the war, 8 RAR was not replaced at the end of its tour of duty in December 1970. 1 ATF was again reduced to just two infantry battalions, albeit with significant armour, artillery and aviation support remaining. The Australian area of operations (AO) remained the same however, with the reduction in forces only adding further to the burden on the remaining battalions. Regardless, following a sustained effort by 1 ATF in Phuoc Tuy Province between September 1969 and April 1970, the bulk of PAVN/VC forces had become inactive and had left the province to recuperate.

Accordingly, the Australians shifted focus, turning their attention to denying the VC the chance to resupply by close ambushing around villages and towns, such as Dat Do and Hoa Long. Although not always successful, such operations yielded significant results and by the end of 1970 the Army of the Republic of Vietnam was increasingly responsible for the security of major population centres. Indeed, the major battles of earlier years were now seen as a thing of the past in Phuoc Tuy. However, in May 1971, following a request from Brigadier Bruce McDonald—the task force commander—the Australian AO was extended a further 4 kilometres (2.5 mi) north across the border into Long Khanh Province. Several reconnaissance patrols from the Special Air Service Regiment (SASR) were subsequently inserted in the vicinity of the Courtenay rubber plantation, and later on the other side of Route 2. These patrols were highly successful, detecting the presence of a substantial PAVN/VC force, while a number of VC were also killed.

== Prelude ==
Intelligence reports in June, in conjunction with the invaluable information gathered by the SASR, located the VC D445 Battalion and the PAVN 3/33 Regiment east of Route 2 along the border between Phuoc Tuy and Long Khanh in an area 30 kilometres (19 mi) north of the Australian base at Nui Dat. These reports indicated that the PAVN/VC were attempting to disrupt the continuing pacification program, and were also using the area to rest, retrain and refit. In response the 1 ATF commander, McDonald, launched a brigade-sized "search and clear" operation, known as "Operation Overlord". Named after the D-Day landings during the Allied invasion of Normandy in 1944, the operation was scheduled to begin on the same day, 27 years later. There was some trepidation among the Australian sub-unit commanders about the use of this name, for operational security reasons, as it was felt that it might telegraph their intentions. (Note: As one Australian participant later recounted "during the operations orders group briefing many of the company commanders were aghast at the names given to the AOs, they were the same as those used on the original Overlord operation twenty seven years prior. The PAVN/VC were keen students of history and would have understood the significance of those names. Using the original code names would have alerted the PAVN/VC to the coming operation and possibly its start date.")

The concept of operations called for a significant blocking force to be inserted, with 4 RAR/NZ (ANZAC) deployed along the line of the Suoi Ran river, A Squadron, 3rd Cavalry Regiment to their west and United States Army 2/8th Battalion, 3rd Cavalry Regiment to the north-east. Meanwhile, 3 RAR—under the command of Lieutenant Colonel Peter Scott—and the Centurion tanks from C Squadron, 1st Armoured Regiment were tasked with driving the PAVN/VC into these positions. A number of fire support bases would be established, with A Field Battery and 104 Field Battery, Royal Australian Artillery providing indirect fire support in conjunction with American gunners, while 3 RAR would search its AO—belatedly designated as AO Gwenda—with three rifle companies (A, B, and C), while D Company would be held in reserve. The plan envisioned movement by road of both troops and equipment using Route 2, as well as air insertion. The terrain in the new AO was thickly wooded with some areas of secondary growth beneath the 30-metre (98 ft) high canopy, as well as numerous water courses, spurs and re-entrants.

== Battle ==
The operation commenced on June 5th with the insertion of blocking forces consisting of Australian, New Zealand and US troops, followed by the aerial insertion of 3 RAR. The landing zone (LZ) was clear of large trees to about 200 metres (220 yd) and was secured by the M113 armoured personnel carriers (APCs) from A Squadron. As a company landed, it was suddenly engaged by intense fire, which also targeted the unsecured B Company LZ 1,300 metres (1,400 yd) to the southwest. The firing eased after a few minutes, however, thereby allowing the insertion of the remaining companies. The Australians subsequently began patrolling and it soon became apparent that they had been dropped within 500 metres (550 yd) of an extensive bunker system.

Signs of a strong PAVN/VC presence were detected almost as soon as 3 RAR began its sweep, while the blocking elements also had a number of sightings and a few contacts with small parties moving north. Possibly alerted by allied air and road movements, the PAVN/VC seemed to be avoiding open combat. Late on the afternoon of June 6th, 5 Platoon, B Company, located what was thought to be the main PAVN/VC position, however with nightfall approaching, it was decided not to press the attack that night. During the evening a few shots were exchanged between the Australians and VC, the Australian platoon subsequently withdrew into a night harbour.

At 06:00 artillery commenced bombarding the position, and following a half-hour of preparation, 5 Platoon resumed its advance expecting the PAVN/VC to have vacated the position during the night, as they had done numerous times in the past. However, after having proceeded only 90 metres (98 yd) the Australians came under heavy fire from the front and both flanks, suffering several casualties in the initial volleys. It soon became apparent that the platoon was pinned down on the edge of a strongly defended and well-concealed bunker system, with the platoon commander calling for assistance from helicopter gunships, as well as indirect mortar fire rather than risking further casualties by withdrawing.

Moving to support the platoon in contact, Scott ordered D Company to conduct an assault against the flank and rear of the bunker complex, mounted in APCs with tanks in support. Two troops of Centurions spearheaded the assault through the jungle from the north, and they soon began receiving heavy small arms fire and rocket-propelled grenades, one of which subsequently caused external damage. Realising that the bunker system was larger than previously estimated, the tanks were forced to halt while the infantry was brought up to begin the assault.

Meanwhile, 5 Platoon was in dire straits and was beginning to run low on ammunition, while a number of its M60 machine guns were also beginning to fail because of the prolonged firing. Moving to outflank the heavily outnumbered Australians, VC were observed emerging from their bunkers. Indeed, only heavy indirect fire and effective suppressing fire from helicopter gunships prevented them from being overrun. Attempting to gain a better position to direct the fire, the B Company forward observer, Lieutenant Ian Mathers, moved forward to 5 Platoon and was killed almost immediately. However, by 09:15 the remainder of B Company was able to link up with the beleaguered platoon, and after an aerial resupply of ammunition, stabilised the situation temporarily.

At 11:00, a second attempt to resupply B Company resulted in an Australian Iroquois helicopter being shot down by heavy ground fire and exploding on impact. Two crew members were killed and another two injured, while another soldier was injured on the ground. With ammunition exploding among the burning wreckage a number of Australians rushed to aid the injured, scrambling through the debris and removing the unexploded ammunition and pulling the survivors to safety. Subsequently, another winch point was established to the rear of the Australian positions for casualty evacuation and resupply.

By mid-afternoon, D Company had moved into position and commenced an assault, pushing through the bunker system from the north-east with the Centurion tanks in close support crushing many bunkers and their occupants with their tracks. The progress of the Australian assault was slowed by thick vegetation and the size of the position, even as the resistance slackened and volume of fire diminished. Indeed, the bunker system was later found to cover nearly a square kilometre and was wider than the front of the assaulting company. Painstakingly the Australians searched each bunker systematically. With the action now over, D Company and the tanks subsequently linked up with B Company and established a night defensive position.

During the final assault, C Company, located to the south, had uncovered a second bunker system which was subsequently captured by the Australians after being hastily abandoned. More than 16,000 rounds of M60 ammunition had been fired during the fighting, along with 6,000 rounds of M16 ammunition. The artillery had fired over 1,453 rounds of 105 mm and 200 rounds of 155 mm high explosive in support. Over the next six days Australian pioneer and engineer demolition teams proceeded to destroy the remaining bunkers.

== Aftermath ==
Despite significantly underestimating the size of the position they faced, the Australians had succeeded in pushing the D445 Battalion and the 3/33 Regiment out of a valuable base area intended for long-term use. Regardless, there were few other tangible results to show for the casualties they had incurred as, although numerous blood trails and body parts scattered around the battlefield indicated that PAVN/VC casualties had been heavy, the majority of their dead had either been removed from the battlefield or were entombed in the bunkers that had been crushed by the Australian tanks. The battle had cost the Australians three killed and six wounded, while only five VC bodies were recovered.

The PAVN/VC had defended strongly in order to allow an orderly evacuation of personnel and stores, and with the Australians unable to concentrate sufficient combat power rapidly enough to ensure a decisive result, they were largely able to achieve this objective. Unfazed by the loss of their base-camps, the bulk of the PAVN/VC force remained intact and later carried out a highly successful ambush by VC 274th Main Force Regiment on 12 June. Seven Australians were killed and three wounded from the HQ 1 ATF Defence and Employment Platoon in this subsequent action, with the bulk of the casualties occurring when an RPG-7 exploded on a box of M18A1 Claymores sitting atop an M113 armoured personnel carrier, igniting them. Operations in Long Khanh continued however, and the Australians established a number of ambushes on possible withdrawal routes, although little contact subsequently occurred.

Operation Overlord finally ended on 14 June and 1 ATF returned to Nui Dat. Overall, despite the heavy contact experienced early on, it had yielded little for the Australians although the D445 Regiment was not encountered in Phuoc Tuy again. The PAVN 33rd Regiment would be encountered three months later in the Battle of Nui Le during Operation Ivanhoe. This would be the last battle for Australian and New Zealand forces before their withdrawal from Vietnam. Overlord was one of the larger task force operations of the war, while it was also the last joint US-Australian battalion-sized operation. On 18 August 1971, Prime Minister William McMahon announced that 1 ATF would cease operations in October, commencing a phased withdrawal. Ultimately, the last Australian forces were withdrawn from South Vietnam by 1973.

== Notes ==
Footnotes

Citations
