= Battle of Nui Le =

Part of the Vietnam War (1971)

Battle of Núi Lé
- Part of the Vietnam War
Date	21 September 1971
Location	Phuoc Tuy Province, South Vietnam (now Ba Ria-Vung Tau Province, Vietnam)
Result	Indecisive

Belligerents
Australia; New Zealand; United States	North Vietnam

Units involved
(Australia) 4 RAR/NZ (ANZAC)	(North Vietnam) 33rd Regiment

Strength
2 infantry companies Artillery; U.S. air support	ANZAC Claim: 600+ infantry

Casualties and losses
(Australia) 5 killed (Australia) 30 wounded	ANZAC Claim: 14 bodies recovered

The Battle of Nui Le was the last major engagement fought by Australian Defense Forces during the Vietnam War. It took place on 21 September 1971, as part of Operation Ivanhoe, in Phuoc Tuy Province, South Vietnam. The battle involved elements of the 4th Battalion, Royal Australian Regiment, including the Royal New Zealand Infantry Regiment Vietnam deployments 1965–1972, in a confrontation with the 33rd Regiment (People's Army of Vietnam) near a rubber plantation.

== Background ==
The decision for the Australian withdrawal from Vietnam was made by the Australian Government and commenced in November 1970, resulting in the gradual reduction of forces in 1971.

Intelligence pointed towards a major buildup of Vietcong (VC) and People's Army of Vietnam (PAVN) forces in the north of Phước Tuy Province and abductions and assassinations had increased in the adjacent Long Khanh Province.

The VC/PAVN were preparing for the withdrawal of the 1st Australian Task Force from Phước Tuy Province, which was gradually being withdrawn from August 1971, and were hoping to defeat the Australians and reclaim the Province.

In June 1971, Australian forces engaged the 33rd Regiment and D445 Battalion in the Battle of Long Khanh during Operation Overlord. Shortly afterward, the 4th Battalion fought D445 Battalion again in Operation Hermit Park. The well-trained and well-armed forces of the 33rd Regiment would pose the greatest threat to 1 ATF during their withdrawal.

On September 19, 1971, Operation Ivanhoe was launched as a search-and-destroy mission involving infantry, armoured personnel carriers (APCs), engineers, artillery, and air support. The goal was to disrupt NVA activity in the area before Australia's planned withdrawal from Vietnam.

== Prelude ==
On June 5, 1971 4RAR/NZ (ANZAC) Battalion, consisting of two companies of Australian infantry (B and D Companies) and one company of New Zealand infantry (V Company), was committed to a reconnaissance in force operation, named Operation Ivanhoe against any PAVN/VC forces in the north of former Phuoc Tuy Province. D Company, 3rd Battalion, Royal Australian Regiment, 1st Troop, A Squadron, 3rd Cavalry Regiment, 4th Troop, C Squadron, 3rd Cavalry Regiment, 2 Troop, 104th Field Battery, elements of 104th Signal Squadron and 161st (Independent) Recce Squadron were also committed to the operation. 1 ATF command had gained intelligence that PAVN 33rd Regiment headquarters and 3rd Battalion had entered Phuoc Tuy from Long Khanh. Unknown to 1 ATF intelligence was that not only had the 3rd Battalion entered, but so had 2nd Battalion, 33rd Regiment. Between the two battalions PAVN numbers amounted to approximately 1,100 well-trained soldiers.

V Company were positioned west of Route 2 conducting Search-and-destroy patrols with three guns from 104th Field Battery to support them. D Company patrolled east of Route 2. B Company patrolled south near Bình Ba, with the other three guns of 104th Field Battery and one of the troops of M113 armored personnel carriers.

PAVN forces fired rockets and mortars at a South Vietnamese Regional Force outpost at Cam My village on Route 2 on 19 September 1971. The Australian M11s sent to investigate and relieve the outpost were ambushed and came under attack from rocket-propelled grenades (RPG) and small arms fire from what was considered to be large force.

11 Platoon of D Company 4 RAR/NZ made contact with a PAVN platoon on 20 September and after a half-hour skirmish, four dead soldiers were found on the battlefield. Their uniforms and equipment and study of the tactics used during the skirmish pointed toward the unit being from the PAVN. Tracks made by the PAVN force indicated about two hundred soldiers had passed through the area.

The commander of the PAVN 33rd Regiment, Colonel Nguyen Van Thuong, had received reports from VC spies that most of the Australian artillery was being packed up for shipping back to Australia therefore it was expected that any fight between PAVN and Australian forces would be between infantry forces alone. The PAVN commander set a number of ambushes for the expected Australian relief forces, however the Australians did not follow the route that was expected by the PAVN and went around the ambush sites instead.

== Battle ==
Patrols by 11 Platoon, D Company 4 RAR/NZ on the morning of 21 September, found sawn logs near the south eastern part of the Courtenay rubber plantation which suggested that there were major fortified bunker positions nearby. B and D Company 4 RAR/NZ moved forward near Núi Lé to attack these fortifications.

12 Platoon, D Company 4 RAR/NZ made first contact with a bunker system containing the security elements of 33rd Regiment's headquarters, suffering one dead from an RPG and four wounded. An estimated platoon strength assault attacked 11 Platoon, and after a 15-minute firefight the PAVN forces withdrew to their bunkers after removing their dead and wounded from the battlefield. 11 and 12 platoons were ordered to withdraw to an area to the south so airstrikes and artillery could be called in to soften up the bunker systems.

Under the control of the Forward Observer, United States Air Force air strikes were called in and F-4 Phantoms and A37 Dragonflys bombed the area with napalm, air to surface missiles, flechette and 500 pound bombs. Iroquois and Cobra helicopter gunships and Australian artillery strikes also hit the bunker system. The American pilots reported PAVN forces fleeing to the north. However this was a deceptive move by the PAVN in that they deliberately sent soldiers running from the scene of an attack to create the misbelief that they had abandoned the fight.

At 14:00, D Company was ordered forward to search and destroy the bunker systems. Unknown to the Australians at that time was that the bunker system was manned by the 33rd Regiment's 2nd Battalion and they had not in fact fled after the previous fight as aerial intelligence had reported. The PAVN let the Australians advance some 50 metres (55 yd) into the bunker complex before opening fire, killing three soldiers and wounding two from 11 Platoon. Many grenades thrown by the PAVN did not explode, reducing casualties. This was fought hand to hand as the Centurion tanks of the 1st Armoured Regiment had previously been withdrawn from South Vietnam. 12 Platoon was also pinned down and could not move forward.

The bodies of the three Australian soldiers who had been killed could not be recovered and orders were given to pull back, which under heavy fire did not happen until 16:00. Just as the sun was setting the ANZAC forces ran into the second PAVN battalion, with the commander of 11 Platoon, Gary McKay being hit twice by a sniper's bullet in the shoulder. It was now pitch black and the forward observer, Captain Greg Gilbert, unable to use his map or compass, and unable to speak to the company commander, Major Jerry Taylor, brought artillery fire to within 25 metres of the company under difficult circumstances as more PAVN forces joined the battle. To compound the artillery problem the company was in range of only three guns and these were at the limit of their range. The PAVN commander subsequently realized the error of the VC intelligence about there being no artillery, and the PAVN disengaged at 21:00 just as the Australians were running low on ammunition.

== Aftermath ==
After a number of hours of fighting the elements of the PAVN 33rd Regiment pulled out of the bunker system and moved north after recovering the dead and wounded they could carry. The Australian wounded were evacuated by helicopter in the morning of 22 September. Five Australians had been killed and 30 wounded. Total PAVN losses are unknown, however 14 bodies were found on the battlefield. On the same day at 17:39 the New Zealanders of V Company RNZIR moved up to reinforce D Company in anticipation of an attack however the day passed with no enemy attack or activity.

On 23 September, D and V companies moved back into the area of the bunkers. V Company began the assault on the PAVN bunker system at 11:05 moving in very short bounds in torrential rainfall through bomb and artillery craters and fallen timber and it was not until 17:25 that they reached the bunkers where they found the bodies of three Australians from 11 Platoon who had been killed in the assault the day before. The PAVN had fully vacated the bunker system. V Company cleared a track to a helicopter winch point and the New Zealand riflemen shouldered arms and formed an impromptu "guard of honour" in tribute as members of D Company moved forward with litters for the fallen. For his role in the battle, Second Lieutenant Garry McKay, who was badly wounded, received the Military Cross. Captain Gilbert was awarded the Distinguished Service Medal in 2018 for his actions during the battle.
