= 4th Battalion, Royal Australian Regiment =

Coordinates: 33.97084°S 150.95387°E

- Active: 1 February 1964 – 15 August 1973; 1 February 1995 – 19 June 2009
- Country: Australia
- Branch: Australian Army
- Type: Infantry (1964-1973, 1995-1997); Special forces (1997-2009)
- Part of: Special Operations Command
- Garrison/HQ: Holsworthy
- Nickname: 4 Commando
- Motto: Duty First
- March: Inverbrackie
- Engagements: Indonesian Confrontation Vietnam War: Battle of Hat Dich; Battle of Long Khanh; Iraq War: 2003 invasion of Iraq
- Decorations: Unit Citation for Gallantry

Commanders
- Colonel-in-Chief: HM The Queen (Australian Infantry Corps)

Insignia
- Unit colour patch

The 4th Battalion, Royal Australian Regiment (4 RAR) was an infantry battalion (later a special forces unit) of the Australian Army, forming part of the Royal Australian Regiment and eventually Special Operations Command. The battalion was formed on 1 February 1964, converted to a special forces unit on 1 February 1997, and was renamed the 2nd Commando Regiment on 19 June 2009.

== History ==
=== Formation ===
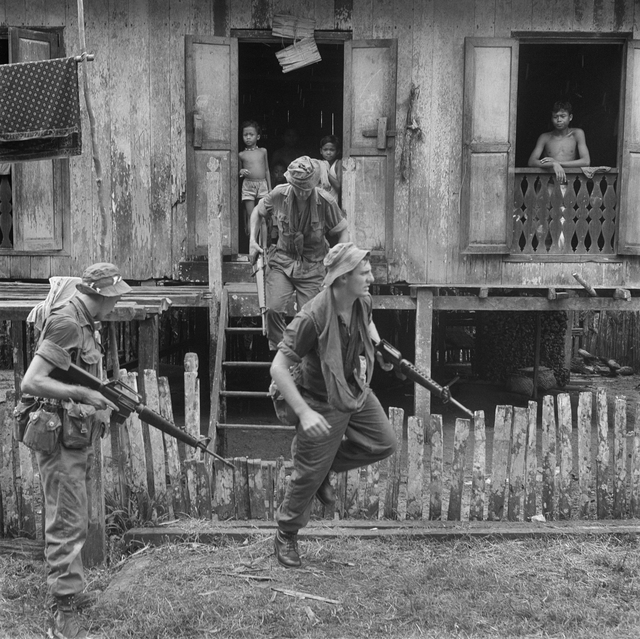
4 RAR soldiers moving through a Malaysian village near the border with Indonesia in June 1966

On 18 January 1952, a Royal Australian Regiment Depot was established as a training unit for a special establishment on the Order of Battle. The depot was later renamed 4 RAR on 10 March 1952. This renaming was necessary because government approval had been given to raise a battalion and not a depot. The primary function of 4 RAR at the time was to train and hold infantrymen for service in Korea. On 24 March 1960, the unit was incorporated into the School of Infantry as "Depot Company, Royal Australian Regiment". This resulted in the formation of the Infantry Centre.

The political decision to raise the fourth battalion of the Royal Australian Regiment was made in 1963. Consequently, instructions for the raising of the battalion were issued on 13 January 1964. The official raising of 4 RAR on 1 February 1964 was the first time a regular infantry battalion had been raised on Australian soil. Additionally, it was stated that this battalion was a new battalion and not a resurrection of the old 4 RAR. The battalion subsequently served in Malaysia as part of the Far East Strategic Reserve from August 1965 – September 1967, and saw active service in Borneo against the Indonesian army during the Indonesia-Malaysia confrontation.

After a period of training the battalion deployed to Sarawak in April 1966 where it was to operate from four company bases in the Bau area. By this time the war was winding down as peace negotiations had begun between Malaysia and Indonesia. Like 3 RAR, 4 RAR conducted cross-border operations and clashed with Indonesian forces on a number of occasions. Its tour was less eventful, however, and the battalion primarily operated in Malaysian territory where it ambushed tracks leading from the border with Indonesia. Malaysia and Indonesia agreed to a peace treaty on 11 August and 4 RAR and the other Commonwealth units in Borneo ceased operations the next day. The battalion returned to Camp Terendak on 30 August having suffered five fatalities in Borneo, though only one man had been killed in action.

Upon its return to Australia in 1967 the battalion began training for service during the Vietnam War.

=== Vietnam War ===
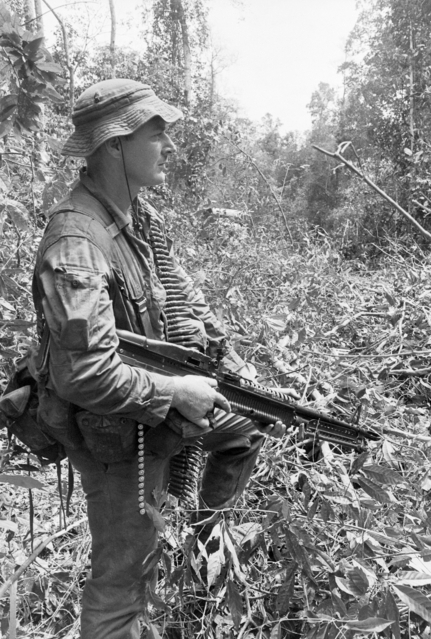
A 4 RAR soldier during an operation in August 1968

The battalion began its first tour of South Vietnam on 1 June 1968, relieving 2 RAR. Based at Nui Dat, in Phuoc Tuy Province it was joined by Victor and Whisky companies from the Royal New Zealand Infantry Regiment (RNZIR) on 2 June, and was formally renamed 4 RAR/NZ (ANZAC) Battalion with an Australian commander and New Zealander second in command. From 23 June the battalion took part in Operation Toan Thang II on the Biên Hòa-Long Bình border, before conducting patrols through Phuoc Tuy. It was subsequently conducting patrols, ambushes, and searches along the Long Khánh-Biên Hòa border from 15 September in an attempt to disrupt Vietcong (VC) activity and deny them access to supplies as part of Operation Hawkesbury. 4 RAR/NZ returned to Nui Dat on 24 September. 4 RAR/NZ returned to the Long Khánh-Biên Hòa border as part of Operation Goodwood on 27 December, in response to increased in VC activity that suggested an offensive was being planned. The battalion was given a brief respite at Nui Dat from 13 January to 7 February, before taking part in Operation Federal in Biên Hòa province. Operation Overlander commenced in Biên Hòa province on 8 April, before the battalion again returned to Phuoc Tuy on 17 April. It was subsequently replaced by 6RAR on 1 May and departed for Australia on 19 May. Total casualties during the deployment included 15 Australians killed and 97 wounded, with five New Zealanders killed and 37 wounded.

4 RAR subsequently underwent a period of further training in Australia, and subsequently returned to South Vietnam for its second tour in May 1971, again relieving 2 RAR. The New Zealanders from Victor Company RNZIR were again integrated into the battalion with the battalion being redesignated 4 RAR/NZ (ANZAC). Continuing the pacification program that 1st Australian Task Force had adopted in Phuoc Tuy in April 1969, 4 RAR/NZ engaged in operations designed at seeking out and destroying the VC in their base areas, preventing their access to the civilian population, and in helping to create a security for the South Vietnamese. However, with the Australian commitment to Vietnam reducing, intelligence reports had indicated the presence of North Vietnamese People's Army of Vietnam troops in northern Phuoc Tuy, and the final battles fought by Australians in Vietnam began following the launch of Operation Ivanhoe (18 September – 2 October 1971). The battalion became involved in intense fighting and although it sustained heavy casualties during these engagements, it successfully hindered VC attempts to move south. Its final involvement came during the Battle of Nui Le on 21 September 1971. The battalion's tour was cut short by the Australian withdrawal, however, and it ultimately completed only eight months of its designated twelve-month tour. The last Australian battalion to leave South Vietnam, the majority of 4 RAR/NZ withdrew from Nui Dat to Vũng Tàu on 7 November 1971, before departing for Australia on 8 December. Victor Company, RNZIR departed on 9 December. Casualties included eight Australians killed and 41 wounded, with one New Zealander killed and five wounded. 'D' Company, 4 RAR, remained behind until 12 March 1972 in order to provide security to rear details.

=== Post-Vietnam ===
With the reorganisation of the Army during 1973 due to the cessation of National Service, 2 RAR and 4 RAR were linked on 15 August 1973, to form 2nd/4th Battalion, Royal Australian Regiment (2/4 RAR). Between 1977 and 1979 2/4 RAR concentrated on conventional warfare including night and mounted operations. On 1 July 1980, the unit was re-organised on light scales and trained as part of the Operational Deployment Force (ODF) in close country and conventional warfare operations. On 1 February 1982, with the official replacement of the title 'Task Force' with 'Brigade', 2/4 RAR became a unit of the 3rd Brigade, 1st Division. The battalion was placed on operational readiness in 1987 and 1990. On each occasion the battalion was prepared to evacuate Australian citizens from Pacific region countries experiencing civil disturbance.

From 1990 to 1993 many individual soldiers from the battalion served with the United Nations in Cambodia. In 1993, 52 soldiers from the battalion were detached to 1RAR for operational service in Somalia as part of Operation Solace. In May 1993, 2/4 RAR was tasked to provide a Rifle Platoon for Operation Gemini in Cambodia. 12 Platoon Delta Company, deployed to Cambodia tasked with providing local security for Australian Army helicopters that were also deployed as part of the relief mission.

It was during the battalion's deployment to Rwanda on Operation Tamar in 1994, that the government made the decision to unlink the 2nd/4th Battalion. This was a result of the 1994 Defence White Paper that identified the need for an additional infantry battalion to enhance the Army's capability to meet strategic guidance requirements. The 2nd/4th Battalion was unlinked by the Chief of the General Staff, Lieutenant General John Grey, on a parade at Samichon Lines, Lavarack Barracks, Townsville at 1500 hrs on 1 February 1995. Upon re-establishment, 4 RAR was based at Holsworthy, in New South Wales under the command of Lieutenant Colonel Ray Smith.

=== Conversion and disbandment ===
In 1996, a decision was made to convert 4 RAR to a special forces unit. On 1 February 1997 the unit was renamed to 4 RAR (Commando). Initially, both Regular and Reserve serving members were given the opportunity to undertake special forces training provided, mainly by 1st Commando Regiment, or elect a posting to a conventional forces unit. Around the beginning of 1998, General Reserve positions ceased to exist in the new structure and reserve members discharged or posted to GRes units. The initial years were busy creating a structure and recruiting members suitable for commando training. Bravo Company was raised first under Major Steve Kluver (who was the Adjutant at the time of the delinking a year earlier; followed by Charlie Company under Major Paddy Evans in 1999, both taking 24 months to reach full maturity. The pace of battalion life during these development years was hectic with capability development, equipment acquisition and training in RCB Malaysia; Canungra focussing every member's attention. The unit conducted operations in East Timor and Iraq, and later lost members in Afghanistan. It has also been awarded citations for bravery and the meritorious unit citation.

On 19 June 2009 the battalion was renamed the 2nd Commando Regiment. At that time, 4 RAR remained on the order of battle, with its colours and traditions maintained and protected, ready to be re-raised as a regular infantry battalion in the future if required.

== Alliances ==
- United Kingdom – Irish Guards
