= 1st Australian Task Force =

Joint military task force

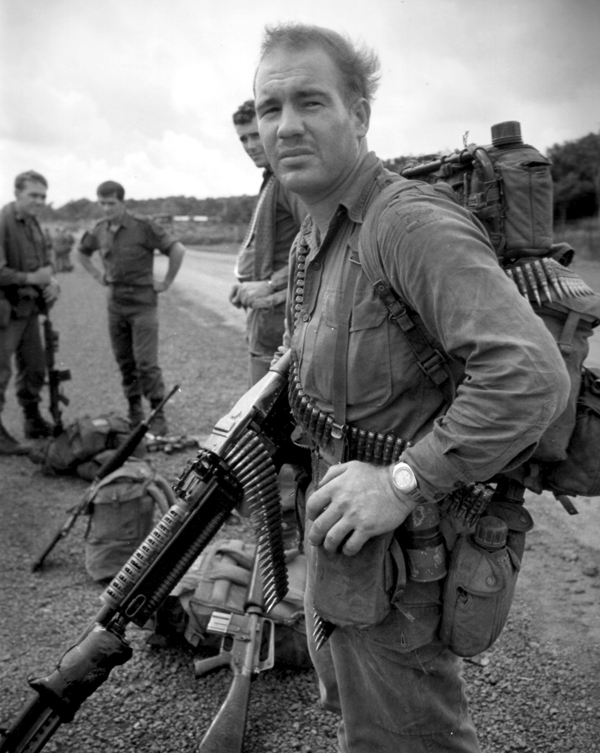
- An Australian soldier in South Vietnam
- Active: 1966–1972
- Country: Australia; New Zealand
- Allegiance: Free World Military Assistance Forces
- Branch: Army
- Type: Combined arms
- Size: Brigade
- Part of: US II Field Force, Vietnam
- Garrison/HQ: Nui Dat, Phuoc Tuy Province, South Vietnam
- Engagements: Vietnam War; Battle of Long Tan; Operation Bribie; Battle of Suoi Chau Pha; Operation Coburg; Battle of Coral–Balmoral; Battle of Hat Dich; Battle of Binh Ba; Battle of Long Khanh; Battle of Nui Le

The 1st Australian Task Force (1 ATF) was a brigade-sized formation which commanded Australian and New Zealand Army units deployed to South Vietnam between 1966 and 1972. 1 ATF was based in a rubber plantation at Nui Dat, 8 kilometres (5.0 mi) north of Bà Rịa in Phuoc Tuy Province and consisted of two and later three infantry battalions, with armour, aviation, engineers and artillery support. While the task force was primarily responsible for securing Phuoc Tuy Province, its units, and the Task Force Headquarters itself, occasionally deployed outside its Tactical Area of Responsibility.

Significant battles conducted by the Task Force were Battle of Long Tan in 1966, Battle of Suoi Chau Pha in 1967, and Operation Coburg and the Battle of Coral–Balmoral in 1968. Other significant actions included Battle of Hat Dich in late-December 1968 and early 1969, Battle of Binh Ba in June 1969, and Battle of Long Khanh in June 1971.

A number of 1 ATF operations resulted in major defeats for the enemy including Operation Marsden in 1969 whereupon enormous caches of weapons and supplies and the main hospital servicing the local Communist forces were discovered and destroyed; and Operation Townsville in April 1970 whereupon Australian and New Zealand platoons captured the operational signals codes and one-time cipher pads used by the VC headquarters. As a result, senior U.S commanders including General Creighton Abrams, Commander MACV were alleged to have referred to it as "the biggest intelligence coup of the war." 1 ATF was withdrawn in late 1971.

== History ==
=== Formation ===
In March 1966 the Australian government decided to increase its commitment to the Vietnam War, announcing that the 1st Battalion, Royal Australian Regiment (1 RAR), which had been serving as the third infantry battalion of the US 173rd Airborne Brigade in Biên Hòa since June 1965, would be replaced at the end of its tour by a two-battalion brigade—the 1st Australian Task Force (1 ATF)—with armour, aviation, engineers and artillery support; in total 4,500 men. Additional Royal Australian Air Force (RAAF) and Royal Australian Navy (RAN) elements would also be deployed and with all three services total Australian strength in Vietnam was planned to rise to 6,300. Meanwhile, 1 RAR's attachment to US forces had highlighted the differences between Australian and American operational methods. Whereas the Americans relied on massed firepower and mobility in big-unit search and destroy operations as part of a war of attrition which often resulted in heavy casualties on both sides, the Australians—although not eschewing conventional operations—emphasised deliberate patrolling using dispersed companies supported by artillery, armored personnel carriers and helicopters to separate the Vietcong (VC) from the population in the villages, while slowly extending government control. Consequently, 1 ATF which would be allocated its own Tactical Area of Responsibility (TAOR) in Phuoc Tuy Province, thereby allowing the Australians to pursue operations more independently using their own methods.

The southernmost province in III Corps, Phuoc Tuy had been selected by the Australians because it was an area of significant VC activity, was located away from the Cambodian border, could be resupplied and, if necessary, evacuated by sea, and enabled them to concentrate their efforts in a single area to achieve greater national recognition. Rather than being attached to a US division, negotiations between senior Australian and US commanders—including Lieutenant General John Wilton and General William Westmoreland—ensured 1 ATF would be an independent command under the operational control of US II Field Force, Vietnam (II FFV), a corps-level headquarters in Bien Hoa which reported directly to Commander US MACV. This would allow the force greater freedom of action and the chance to demonstrate the Australian Army's evolving concept for counterinsurgency warfare, developed in part from its operations during the Malayan Emergency. The task force would be commanded by Brigadier David Jackson, an experienced infantry officer who had served in the Middle East and New Guinea during the Second World War, and later in the Korean War and commanded the AATTV and Australian Army Force Vietnam prior to taking up the appointment. With the new force given less than two months to deploy, hasty preparations began in Australia to ready it. Meanwhile, the headquarters of the 1st Brigade was subsequently used to raise 1 ATF.

Following US and Australian negotiations, the New Zealand government was given the choice of continuing the attachment of the 161st Battery, Royal New Zealand Artillery to the US 173rd Airborne Brigade based at Biên Hòa or joining 1 ATF in Phuoc Tuy. As with 1 RAR, the New Zealand battery had served under US command since June 1965 and was New Zealand's only military contribution to operations in Vietnam at that time. The decision was subsequently made to integrate the New Zealand battery into 1 ATF in June 1966, and from 1967 New Zealand infantry and NZSAS.

=== Operations ===
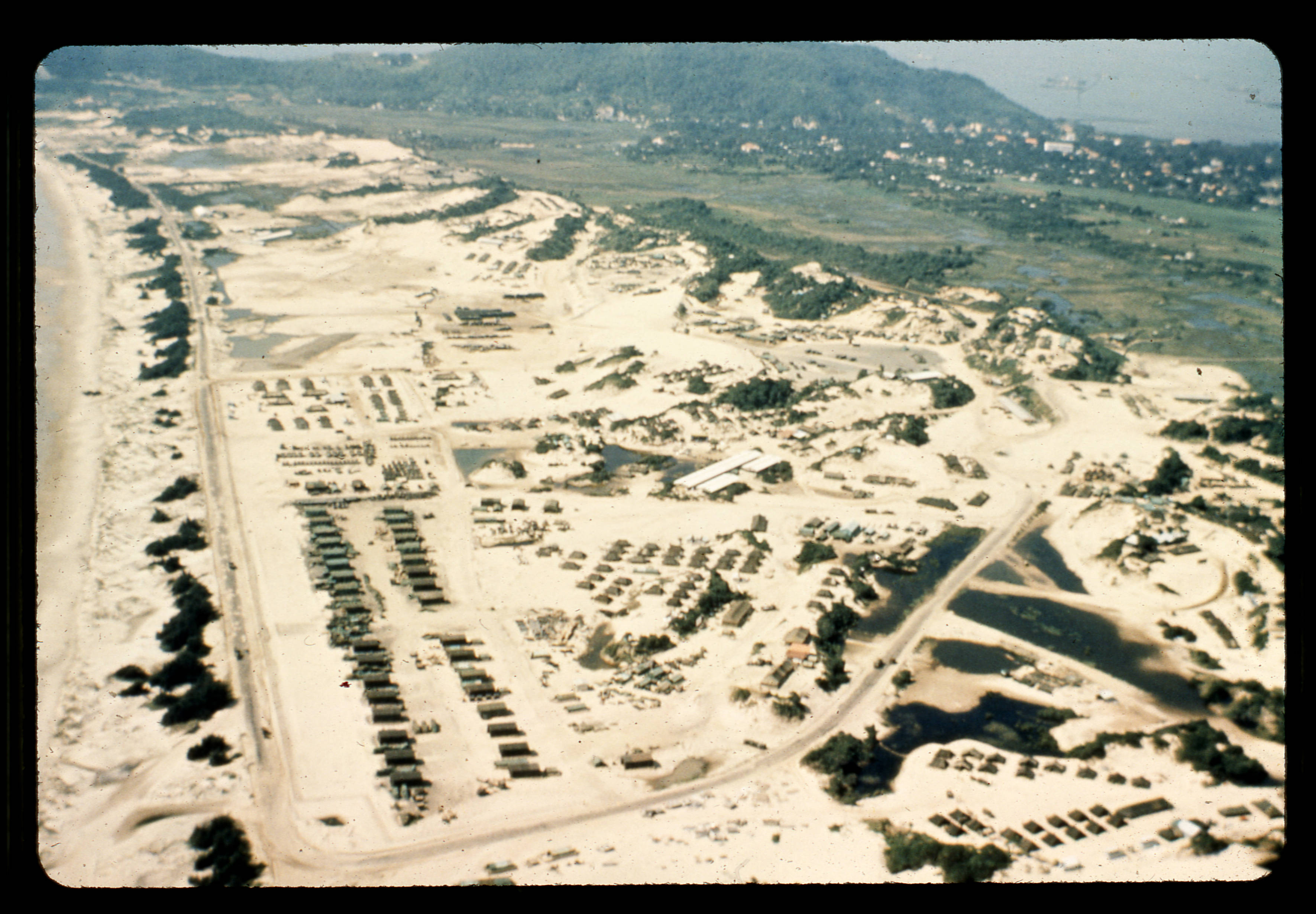
1st Australian Logistic Support Group, Vũng Tàu, 3 November 1966

1 ATF was tasked with dominating its TAOR and conducting operations throughout Phuoc Tuy as required, as well as deploying anywhere in III Corps and neighbouring Bình Thủy in IV Corps on order. Its principal objective was to secure Route 15 for military movement to ensure allied control of the port at Vung Tau, while politically it sought to extend government authority in Phuoc Tuy. The task force would be based in a rubber plantation at Nui Dat, 8 kilometres (5.0 mi) north of Ba Ria, while a logistics and support base would be established in Vũng Tàu with a direct link forward via road. Situated on Route 2, Wilton had selected Nui Dat because its central position offered short lines of communication, it was close but not adjacent to the main population centres, and would allow 1 ATF to disrupt VC activity in the area. Astride a major communist transit and resupply route, it was close to a VC base area yet near enough to Ba Ria to afford security to the provincial capital and facilitate liaison with the local authorities. Australian doctrine emphasised establishing a base and spreading influence outwards to separate the guerrillas from the population. By lodging at Nui Dat they aimed to form a permanent presence between the VC and the inhabitants. 1 ATF would then focus on destroying VC forces in the province, while security of the towns and villages remained a South Vietnamese responsibility.

Initially, 1 ATF consisted of two infantry battalions—the 5th and 6th Battalion, Royal Australian Regiment. Other units included the 1st APC Squadron operating M113 armoured personnel carriers, 1st Field Regiment, Royal Australian Artillery which consisted of one New Zealand and two Australian batteries equipped with eighteen 105 mm L5 Pack Howitzers, 3rd SAS Squadron, engineers from the 1st Field Squadron and 21st Engineer Support Troop, 103rd Signals Squadron, 161st Reconnaissance Flight operating Cessna 180s and Bell H-13 Sioux light observation helicopters, and an intelligence detachment. Support arrangements were provided by the 1st Australian Logistic Support Group (1 ALSG) established amid the sand dunes at Vung Tau 30 kilometres (19 mi) south, while eight UH-1B Iroquois helicopters from No. 9 Squadron RAAF also supported 1 ATF from Vung Tau. Although 1 ATF was ostensibly independent, US forces provided considerable support including medium and heavy artillery, close air support, helicopter gunships, medium and heavy lift helicopters and additional utility helicopters. Six 155 mm M109 self-propelled howitzers from A Battery, US 2/35th Artillery Battalion were also permanently attached at Nui Dat. The largest Australian formation deployed since the Second World War, although many of 1 ATF's officers and non-commissioned officers had seen extensive operational service, the task force had been hastily assembled and included many untried National Servicemen. Few of its senior personnel had direct experience of counter-insurgency operations, and even less a first-hand understanding of the situation in Vietnam, while it had been unable to train together before departure. Despite these shortfalls 1 ATF had been required to rapidly deploy and commence operations in a complex environment.

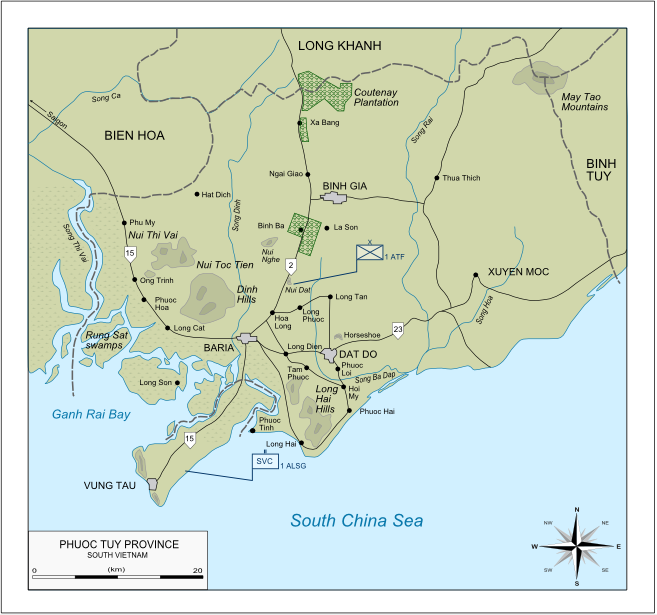
Phuoc Tuy Province, South Vietnam

The task force began arriving at Vung Tau between April and June 1966. From 17 May to 15 June, US and Australian forces secured the area around Nui Dat during Operation Hardihood, deploying two battalions of the US 173rd Airborne Brigade and an element of 1 RAR. 5 RAR deployed from Vung Tau the same day and was tasked with clearing any VC found in an area 6,000 metres (6,600 yd) east and north-east of Nui Dat. 1 ATF occupied Nui Dat from 5 June, with Jackson flying-in with his tactical headquarters to take command. The plan to operate independently resulted in significant self-protection requirements and 1 ATF's initial priorities were to establish a base and ensure its own security. Meanwhile, Wilton's decision to occupy Nui Dat rather than co-locate 1 ATF with its logistic support at Vung Tau allowed the task force to have a greater impact, but resulted in additional manpower demands to secure the base. Indeed, the security requirements of an understrength brigade in an area of strong VC activity utilised up to half the force, limiting its freedom of action. As part of the occupation all inhabitants within a 4,000-metre radius had been removed and resettled nearby. A protective security zone was then established, the limit of which was designated Line Alpha, and a free-fire zone declared. Although unusual for allied installations in Vietnam, many of which were located near populated areas, the Australians hoped to deny the VC observation of Nui Dat and afford greater security to patrols entering and exiting the area.

At the Battle of Long Tan on 18 August 1966, D Company 6 RAR with considerable artillery support held off and defeated a VC force of at least regimental strength. 18 Australians were killed and 24 wounded, while 245 VC dead were later recovered from the battlefield. A decisive Australian victory, Long Tan proved a major local setback for the VC, indefinitely forestalling an imminent movement against Nui Dat. Although there were other large-scale encounters in later years, 1 ATF was not fundamentally challenged again. (Note: While the VC were largely forced to withdraw to the borders of the province by 1968–69, the situation in Phuoc Tuy was challenged during the 1968 Tet Offensive, in mid-1969 following the incursion of the North Vietnamese 33rd Regiment, in mid-1971 with further incursions by the 33rd Regiment and several VC main force units, and during the Easter Offensive in 1972. Attacks on RF outposts and village incursions also continued.) The battle established the task force's dominance over the province, and allowed it to pursue operations to restore government authority. Regardless, during February 1967 the Australians suffered their heaviest casualties in the war to that point, losing 16 men killed and 55 wounded in a single week, the bulk during Operation Bribie. 5 RAR and 6 RAR completed their tours in mid-1967 and were replaced by 7 RAR and 2 RAR. The first New Zealand infantry, Victor Company RNZIR, arrived in May 1967 from Malaysia and served with the outgoing 6 RAR before and then with the newly arrived 2 RAR.

What would ultimately prove to be a tactical blunder by 1 ATF Command and account for the majority of Australian and New Zealand casualties throughout the war, was the laying of a minefield over a 10 km area from Dat Do to the coast. By June 1967, close to 23,000 "jumping jack" mines had been laid by the Australian engineers within a 100-metre-wide strip of cleared ground between a double row of fences. Security of the minefield proved to be ineffective and the VC thereafter simply uplifted the mines and re-used them against the Australians and New Zealanders.

Meanwhile, with the war continuing to escalate following further American troop increases, 1 ATF was heavily reinforced. A third infantry battalion, 3rd Battalion, Royal Australian Regiment, arrived in December 1967. The New Zealand contribution also increased with a second infantry company added also in December 1967. Whisky Company RNZIR was initially attached to 3 RAR and then came under operational control of 2 RAR, as with Victor Company.

In February 1968 the Australian government sent two troops of Centurion tanks from its 1st Armoured Regiment to South Vietnam, each with four tanks, plus two tanks with the squadron headquarters. Two bulldozer tanks and two bridgelayer tanks were also committed. A third troop was created out of the headquarters tanks, and by August the squadron was brought up to its full strength of 26 tanks. Australian and New Zealand infantry would work very closely with these tank troops for the remainder of their time in Vietnam. Additional Iroquois helicopters were also added. In all a further 1,200 men were deployed, taking the total Australian troop strength to 7,672 combat troops, its highest level during the war. This increase effectively doubled the combat power available to the task force commander.

On 1 March 1968 the Australian and New Zealand governments agreed to merge the New Zealand rifle companies into one Australian battalion which resulted in both New Zealand companies integrating with A, B, and C Companies of 2 RAR to become 2 RAR/NZ (ANZAC). With a total of five rifle companies it was stronger than the standard Australian battalion which only had four. New Victor and Whisky companies from RNZIR were again attached to subsequent 4 RAR and 6 RAR rotations during later tours. The ANZAC battalions were commanded by an Australian officer, with a New Zealand officer appointed as deputy commander. All of the New Zealanders were regular soldiers. In late 1968 a New Zealand Special Air Service troop was also attached to the Australian SAS Squadron. New Zealand strength peaked at 552 troops in 1969. At its height 1 ATF numbered over 8,000 men, including three infantry battalions, armour, artillery, engineers, logistics and aviation units in support.

Although primarily operating out of Phuoc Tuy, the 1 ATF was also available for deployment elsewhere in III Corps and with the province progressively coming under control, 1968 saw the Australians spending a significant period of time conducting operations further afield. 1 ATF was subsequently deployed astride infiltration routes leading to Saigon in order to interdict communist movement against the capital as part of Operation Coburg during the 1968 Tet Offensive and later during the Battle of Coral–Balmoral in May and June 1968. At Fire Support Bases Coral and Balmoral the Australians had clashed with regular People's Army of Vietnam (PAVN) and VC main force units operating in battalion and regimental strength for the first time in near conventional warfare, ultimately fighting their largest, most hazardous and most sustained battle of the war. During 26 days of fighting Australian casualties included 25 killed and 99 wounded, while PAVN/VC casualties included 267 killed confirmed by body count, 60 possibly killed, seven wounded and 11 captured. Later, from December 1968 to February 1969 two battalions from 1 ATF again deployed away from their base in Phuoc Tuy province, operating against suspected communist bases in the Hat Dich area, in western Phuoc Tuy, south-eastern Bien Hoa and south-western Long Khan provinces during Operation Goodwood. From May 1969 the main effort of the task force returned to Phuoc Tuy Province.

One operation which became infamous as it became known to the public was Operation Mundingburra, a mine-clearing action conducted in the Long Hai Hills from 15 July 1969 involving 6 RAR/NZ (ANZAC.) The operation had three objectives: disrupt enemy infiltration into the villages, maintain regular checkpoints on the main access routes between the villages, visit local hamlets and offer medical services to those villagers who might need it. All platoons conducted mine clearing and ambushing tasks. After 31 days the operation ended with casualties all from mine detonations. These were Australian mines which had been uplifted by the VC from the Australian minefield laid in 1967 and relaid or booby trapped. 6 RAR/NZ's casualties were 11 killed (6 New Zealanders, 5 Australians) and 54 wounded (10 New Zealanders, 44 Australians). A particularly disastrous incident on 21 July was the major inspiration for the 1983 pop song I Was Only 19 by the Australian band Redgum.

One of the most successful 1 ATF operations which severely weakened the PAVN/VC forces in 1 ATF's area of operations was Operation Marsden (3–28 December 1969) which was a search-and-destroy mission conducted in the Mây Tào Mountains where the VC 5th Division was headquartered. The VC base in the mountains provided logistics and controlled the VC 274th and 275th Regiments as well as local VC guerilla forces. The area was also the location of the K76A Hospital, which was the principal provider of medical services for the regional VC and PAVN forces. All five infantry companies from 6 RAR/NZ were deployed on 2 December. A Company scaled the mountains, having to make their way through a 200-metre-wide minefield of improvised mines made from unexploded U.S Air Force cluster bombs. On 8 December, D Company located the first major stores dump in a cave at the south of the mountains. It contained approximately 2,500 anti-personnel grenades, 22 anti-tank mines, 22 boxes of anti-watercraft mines and a large quantity of weapons, equipment and explosives. On the same day, B Company, on the north side of the mountain, found the first signs of the hospitals. The following day they discovered a bunker system of 12 bunkers identified as part of K76A Hospital. On 11 December V Company, operating in the south-east, located another hospital with 17 large bunkers large enough to take up to 100 patients and identified it as also part of K76A. By this time all companies were discovering enemy signs and having contacts. On the same day W Company, which was patrolling north-east of the Song Rai River, located a large enemy camp with 25–28 VC and at first light on 12 December attacked the group with one VC killed while the remainder escaped. A Company successfully scaled the western side and were able to establish a fire support base on the summit. On 16 and 17 December D Company located the K76A pharmacy, dental post and orderly room. There they recovered a huge supply of medical drugs. On 19 December, V Company discovered the major part of the hospital, a 200-bed complex complete with underground pharmacy, operating pits and convalescing wards. An enormous cache of medical supplies, food, tools, and equipment were found at the hospital and a large weapons cache was discovered nearby. Over the next week, all rifle companies conducted day and night search and destroy missions in their areas until 29 December 1969. Four Australians were killed with none wounded during the operation. There were no New Zealand casualties. VC killed numbered 22 with 5 wounded and 21 prisoners, 14 of whom had been patients of the K76A Hospital. Between D Company's and V Company's finds, approximately 1.5 tonnes of pharmaceuticals had been captured, thought to be the largest amount ever seized in the war by allied forces.

Other significant Australian actions during this period included the Binh Ba in June 1969, and Long Khanh in June 1971.

=== Withdrawal ===
The Australian withdrawal started in November 1970. As a consequence of the overall US strategy of Vietnamization and with the Australian government keen to reduce its own commitment to the war, 8 RAR was not replaced at the end of its tour of duty. 1 ATF was again reduced to just two infantry battalions, albeit with significant armour, artillery and aviation support remaining. One of the New Zealand infantry companies—W Company—was also withdrawn at this time. Australian combat forces were further reduced during 1971 as part of a phased withdrawal. The Battle of Nui Le on 21 September proved to be the last major battle fought by Australian and New Zealand forces in the war, and resulted in five Australians being killed and 30 wounded. The New Zealand SAS troop was withdrawn in February and the artillery battery in May. Finally, on 16 October Australian forces handed over control of the base at Nui Dat to South Vietnamese forces, while 4 RAR, the last Australian infantry battalion in South Vietnam, sailed for Australia onboard HMAS Sydney on 9 December 1971. V Company and the New Zealand medical team were also withdrawn at this time. Meanwhile, D Company, 4 RAR with an assault pioneer and mortar section and a detachment of APCs remained in Vung Tau protect the task force headquarters and 1 ALSG until the final withdrawal of stores and equipment could be completed, finally returning to Australia on 12 March 1972.

Although 1 ATF had been able to dominate its area of operations and successfully reduced the PAVN/VC's ability to "influence and coerce" the population of the province, while affording the South Vietnamese government some degree of control, this did not last following their withdrawal, and PAVN/VC forces began to move back into Phuoc Tuy following their departure. Ultimately, despite maintaining a reputation for professionalism, the operations of the task force had little impact on the outcome of the war. Between June 1966 and December 1971, 1 ATF recorded at least 3,370 PAVN/VC killed, the majority in Phuoc Tuy, while an unknown number were wounded. Total Australian Army casualties during the Vietnam War were 478 killed and 3,025 wounded, the bulk of which were sustained by 1 ATF. New Zealand casualties during the war were 37 killed and 187 wounded, the majority of which while serving in 1 ATF.

== Order of battle ==
1 ATF's organisation varied as Australian and New Zealand units rotated through South Vietnam and the total size of the Australian and New Zealand force in South Vietnam changed. The task force typically consisted of:

- Headquarters Company 1 ATF;
- Two or three infantry battalions;
- One field artillery regiment (with one New Zealand field battery and a US medium artillery battery attached);
- One field squadron (engineers): 1 Field Squadron;
- One engineer support troop: 21 Engineer Support Troop;
- One construction engineer squadron: 17th Construction Squadron;
- One APC Squadron (M-113);
- One Armoured Squadron (Centurion tanks);
- One Australian SAS Squadron;
- One Signals Squadron;
- 1st Australian Task Force Logistics Company; and
- 161 Reconnaissance Flight (Bell Sioux Light Observation Helicopters, Cessna 180s, a Cessna Bird Dog and a Pilatus PC-6 Porter)

New Zealand forces attached to 1 ATF included:

- One to two rifle companies (W and V Company, Royal New Zealand Infantry Regiment);
- One artillery battery (161st Battery, Royal New Zealand Artillery); and
- One New Zealand SAS troop.

The Australian Army Training Team Vietnam (AATTV) was separate from 1 ATF and reported directly to the Australian Force Vietnam (AFV) headquarters located in Saigon which provided administrative support to all Australian forces in South Vietnam. The 1st Australian Civil Affairs Unit (1 ACAU) was established in 1967 and worked closely with 1 ATF; however, it was also under the command of AFV. No. 9 Squadron RAAF operating UH-1 Iroquois utility helicopters was based at Vung Tau and operated in support of 1 ATF.

== Commanders ==
The following officers commanded 1 ATF:

- Brigadier O.D. Jackson (1966–1967);
- Brigadier S.C. Graham (1967);
- Brigadier R.L. Hughes (1967–1968);
- Brigadier C.M.I. Pearson (1968–1969);
- Brigadier S.P. Weir (1969–1970);
- Brigadier W.G. Henderson (1970–1971); and
- Brigadier B.A. McDonald (1971–1972).
