= Phước Tuy province =

Historic province of Vietnam

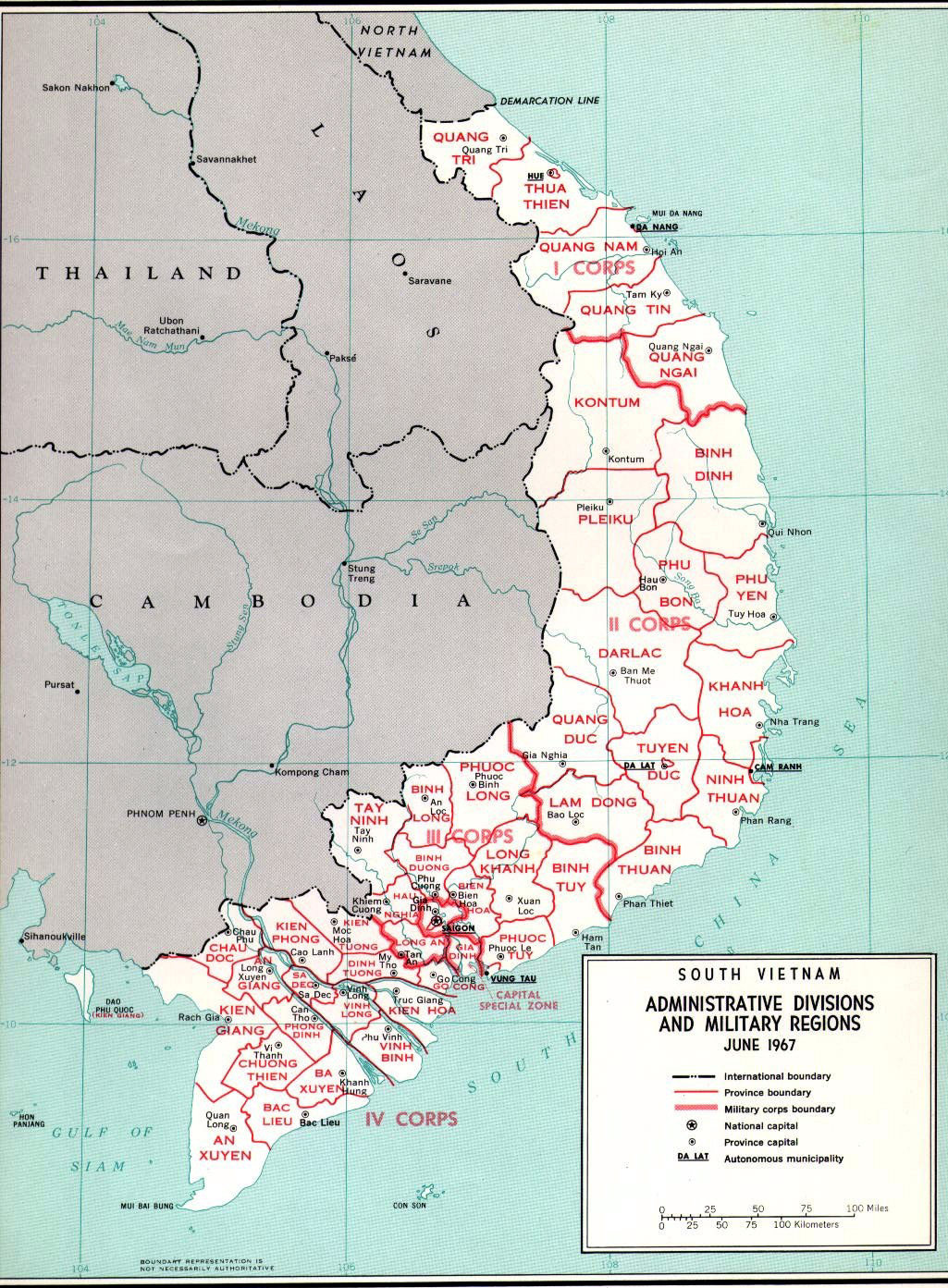
Phước Tuy province in the map of South Vietnam

Phước Tuy was a province of the former South Vietnam.

It now mostly corresponds to Bà Rịa–Vũng Tàu province, just southeast of Ho Chi Minh City in reunified Vietnam.

During the Vietnam War it was the main region of operations for the 1st Australian Task Force.

1 ATF was based in a rubber plantation at Nui Dat, about 8 kilometers north of Ba Ria.

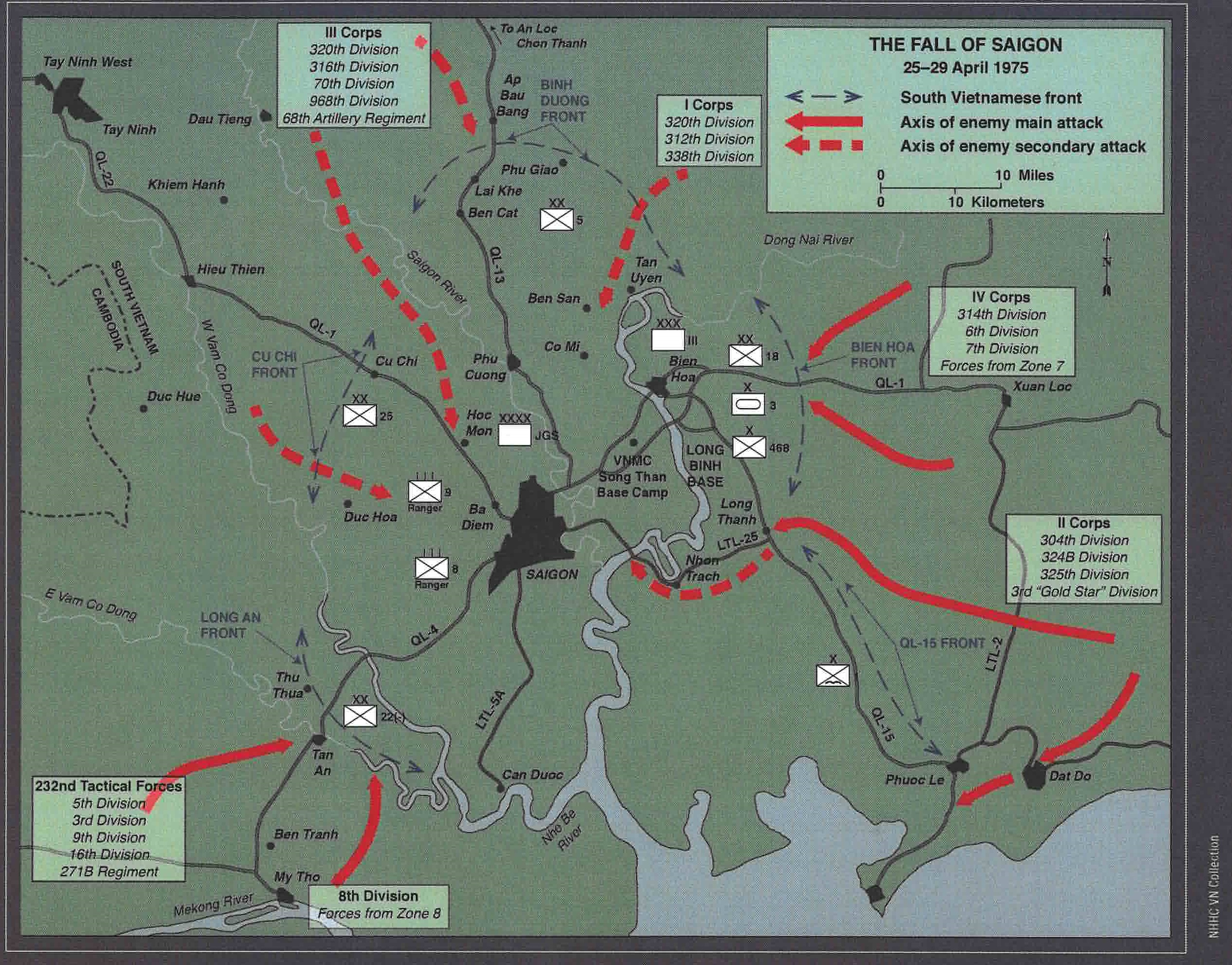
The PAVN's encirclement of Saigon

In 1975, Phước Tuy was one among five last Army of the Republic of Vietnam (ARVN) fronts defending Saigon against the People's Army of Vietnam (PAVN) forces before its fall on 30 April. The ARVN 3rd Infantry Division and the 1st Airborne Brigade there had fought fiercely with the PAVN 3rd Division (Sao Vàng) before being overrun at noon of 30 April.
