= Battle of Suoi Chau Pha =

Part of the Vietnam War (1967)

Coordinates: 10.6500°N 107.1500°E

Battle of Suối Châu Pha
- Part of the Vietnam War
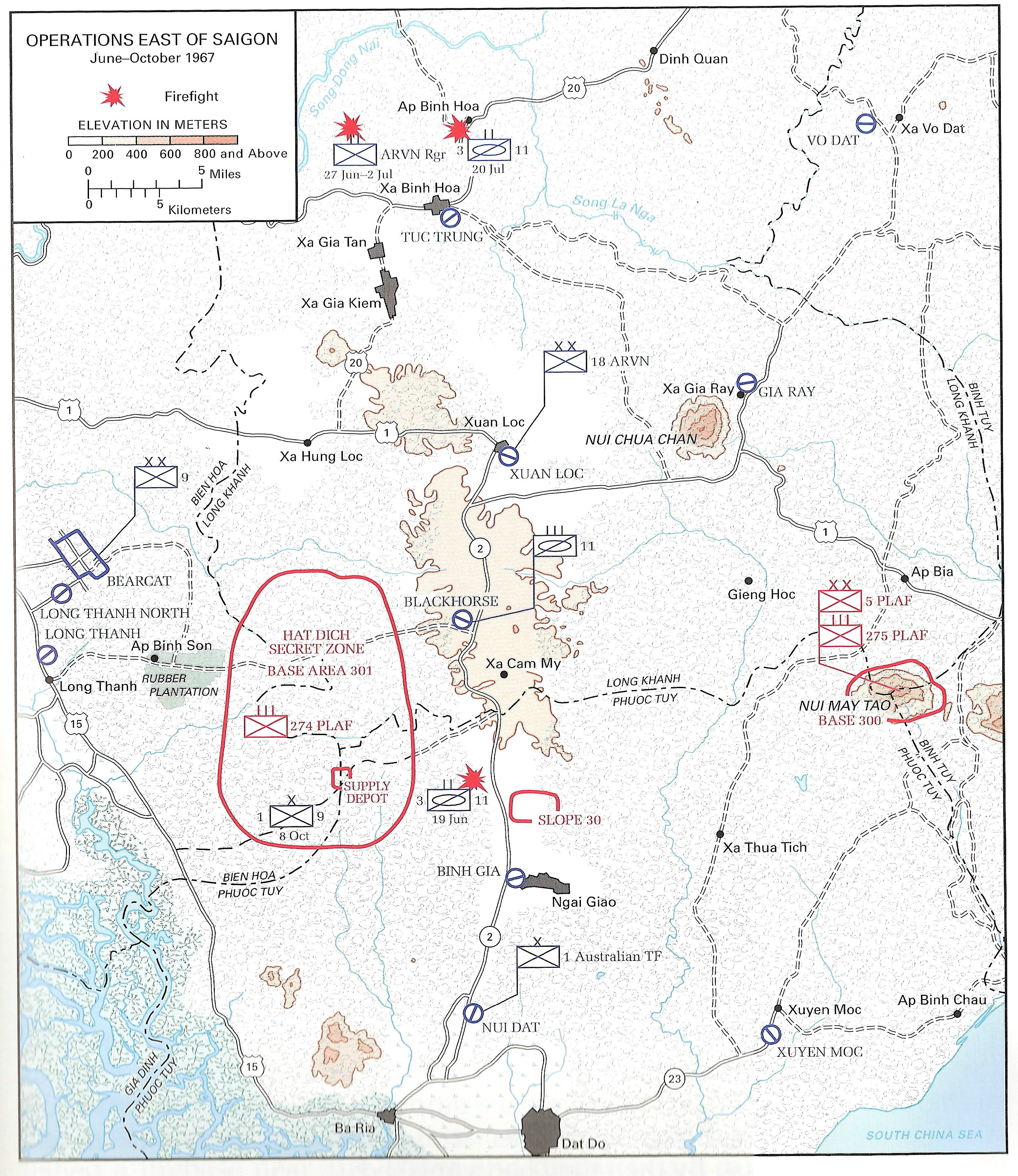
- Operations east of Saigon, June to October 1967
Date	6 August 1967
Location	Eastern Hát Dịch area, Phước Tuy Province, South Vietnam
Result	Allied victory

Belligerents
Australia; United States; New Zealand	Việt Cộng; North Vietnam

Commanders and leaders
(Australia) Eric Smith (Australia) Ewart O'Donnell	Ut Thoi

Units involved
(Australia) 7 RAR	274th Regiment

Strength
~120 men artillery	~300 men

Casualties and losses
6 killed 20 wounded	7 bodies recovered 33 more believed killed or wounded 200 further estimated casualties

The Battle of Suối Châu Pha (6 August 1967) was fought during the Vietnam War between Australian troops and the Việt Cộng. The battle took place during Operation Ballarat, an Australian search and destroy operation in the eastern Hát Dịch area, north-west of Núi Đất in Phước Tuy province. Following a covert insertion the day before which had caught a number of Việt Cộng sentries by surprise, A Company, 7th Battalion, Royal Australian Regiment (7 RAR) had patrolled forward unaware of the presence of a large Việt Cộng main force unit nearby. Clashing with a reinforced company from the Việt Cộng 3rd Battalion, 274th Regiment, a classic encounter battle ensued between two forces of roughly equal size. Fought at close quarters in dense jungle amid a heavy monsoon rain, both sides suffered heavy casualties as neither was able to gain an advantage. Finally, after a battle lasting several hours, the Australian artillery proved decisive and the Việt Cộng were forced to withdraw, dragging many of their dead from the battlefield after having suffered crippling losses.

== Background ==
=== Military situation ===
Việt Cộng soldiers, believed to be from D445 Battalion.

By the second half of 1967 the Việt Cộng seemed to have melted away in Phước Tuy province, abandoning many of their bunker systems and avoiding the main roads and towns. The Battle of Long Tân and Operation Bribie had weakened the communist forces in the province, while further operations had restricted their movement and logistics. This prompted the commander of the 1st Australian Task Force (1 ATF)—Brigadier Stuart Graham—to speculate that the Việt Cộng may have fled to the border, perhaps leaving the province altogether. Graham reasoned that a succession of operations in the south-east of the province and the completion of the barrier minefield at Đất Đỏ meant that no single, sizable threat remained to the populated areas of Phước Tuy.

Australian M2A2 Howitzer during Operation Paddington.

The Australians had continued to operate independently within Phước Tuy province, and while the war had become a series of big unit search and destroy operations in a war of attrition for the Americans, they had pursued their own counter-insurgency campaign. Regardless, differences of opinion between Australian and American methods had produced friction, and increasingly impatient with the Australian approach, in early 1967 the Commander US MACV, General William Westmoreland, had complained to the Commander Australian Forces Vietnam, Major General Tim Vincent, demanding a more aggressive approach. However, the Australians were convinced that deliberate patrolling techniques were more effective in separating communist forces from the population in the villages while working towards slowly extending government control, and such urgings went largely unheeded.

The highway to Xuyên Mộc in the east had been reopened by the Australians in March and April, and with the Việt Cộng 275th Regiment believed to have been severely weakened following Long Tân, a series of operations aimed at destroying the Việt Cộng 274th Regiment were subsequently launched by 1 ATF. Australian assessments of the Việt Cộng 275th Regiment were seemingly reinforced by its unsuccessful attempt to ambush a convoy from US 11th Armoured Cavalry Regiment (11 ACR) on 2 December 1966. Meanwhile, after Westmoreland had again pressed Vincent on what he saw as the limited results achieved by Australian tactics, a large joint US-Australian operation was mounted against the Mây Tào mountains in Phước Tuy, moving against the communist bases in the area. The largest search and destroy operation mounted by the Australians to that point, Operation Paddington (9–15 July) was carried out in co-operation with American and South Vietnamese units based in Biên Hòa province, and targeted the Việt Cộng 5th Division.

Mounted on a large scale under American command and involving nearly 15,000 troops, Paddington failed to result in significant contact, in spite of the employment of well co-ordinated search techniques and blocking forces. A large number of Việt Cộng camps, bunkers and storage areas were however uncovered and destroyed, resulting in significant disruption to the communist logistic system. Under the overall command of Major General George G. O'Connor, commander US 9th Infantry Division, allied forces for Operation Paddington included the US 1st Brigade, 9th Infantry Division, the 2nd Battalion, US 47th Infantry Regiment (Mechanised), the US 11th Armoured Cavalry Regiment, Task Force B Marine Corps (RVN) and the 1st Australian Task Force, as well as various supporting arms including two artillery batteries and more than a thousand armoured vehicles and helicopters. Việt Cộng casualties included 92 killed, including 31 by 1 ATF for the loss of one Australian killed and another wounded. Nonetheless, the results were disappointing for the Australians, and the Việt Cộng continued to elude them.

== Prelude ==
=== Opposing forces ===
Based at Núi Đất in the III Corps Tactical Zone as part of US II Field Force, Vietnam, 1 ATF now included two infantry battalions plus armour, aviation, engineers and artillery support, with total Australian troop strength in Vietnam reaching 6,300 men. Logistic arrangements were provided by the 1st Australian Logistic Support Group based at the port of Vũng Tàu. The 5th and 6th Battalions, Royal Australian Regiment (6 RAR) subsequently returned to Australia in May and June 1967, and were replaced by the 2nd and 7th Battalions, Royal Australian Regiment (7 RAR). Meanwhile, Việt Cộng units operating in the province in early 1967 included Main Forces from the Việt Cộng 5th Division, which consisted of the 274th Regiment and 275th Regiment, each of three infantry battalions under the command of Senior Colonel Nguyen The Truyen. Supporting this force were a number of artillery, engineer, medical and logistic units. Group 89 (Artillery) was equipped with recoilless rifles, medium mortars and heavy machine-guns. Local Forces included D445 Provincial Mobile Battalion, a provincial unit normally operating in the south of the province and in Long Khánh, while guerrilla forces included two companies in the Chau Duc district, one in Long Dat and a platoon in Xuyên Mộc; in total around 4,500 men.

Despite the optimistic Australian assessments of Việt Cộng capability, rather than having left Phước Tuy the communists were more likely reinforcing and consolidating in preparation for future operations, avoiding battle with the Australians in order to preserve their strength. Regardless, D445 Battalion had suffered heavy casualties and posed a diminished threat, while the headquarters of the Việt Cộng 5th Division was located near the northern border, west of the Mây Tào mountains, with its fighting formations widely dispersed. The Việt Cộng 275th Regiment was reported to have moved north to War Zone D for retraining and refitting, and the Việt Cộng 274th Regiment had moved from its scattered locations in the north-west Hát Dịch to replace it in the north-east of the province, and was now operating in unfamiliar terrain. Meanwhile, casualties, illness and poor local recruitment meant they were now largely reliant on reinforcements from North Vietnam. Unsure of the next move, the Việt Cộng 5th Division adopted a cautious posture, with only the 1st Battalion, 275th Regiment remaining in the Mây Tào mountains while the 274th Regiment dispersed east of Route 2 for the remainder of the month.

=== Planning and preliminary operations ===
The province now seemed secure and Graham saw the opportunity to continue pacification on a more methodical basis in Phước Tuy. Planning to attack the remaining Việt Cộng where they were most vulnerable, the Australians returned to interdicting communist supply lines and bases, with 2 RAR conducting two search and destroy operations to the east of Đất Đỏ—Operation Cairns in late-July followed by Operation Atherton in mid-August, both of which resulted in only minor contact. Meanwhile, the Hát Dịch area had been quiet since US forces had swept of the area as part of Operation Akron (9–29 June), and Australian intelligence assessed that it was free of Việt Cộng main force combat units. (Note: Operation Akron had preceded Operation Paddington with the US 1st Brigade, 9th Infantry Division clearing the Hát Dịch itself, driving east from Highway 15 with engineers in support, while 11 ACR worked with a South Vietnamese ranger battalion in the eastern Hát Dịch. Largely successful for the Americans, it resulted in Việt Cộng losses of 80 killed or captured.) By late-July communist rear services units and other supporting units were believed to have begun moving back into the area, in an attempt to rehabilitate their base areas that had been destroyed in the earlier fighting. Yet in reality the location of communist forces was largely unknown to the Australians. In mid-July, the Việt Cộng 274th Regiment—now believed to be commanded by Ut Thoi—had been forced to move from the Hát Dịch towards its north-eastern base areas due to Operation Paddington and Australian signals intelligence had been able to effectively track the regiment's movement due to the location of its transmitter. (Note: According to another source 274th Regiment may have been commanded Nguyen Duong.) However, 1 ATF intelligence officers had then lost track of the unit.

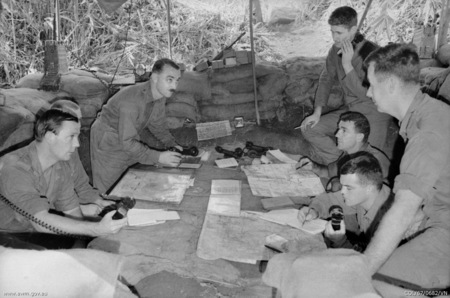
7 RAR Battalion Headquarters during Operation Ballarat.

Operation Ballarat was subsequently planned to assess the extent of the Việt Cộng's efforts to re-establish their supply lines and to repair bunkers and camps in the eastern Hát Dịch that had been destroyed by previous operations. The concept of operations envisioned 7 RAR, under the command of Lieutenant Colonel Eric Smith, creating a series of company patrol bases, from which platoon fighting patrols would gather intelligence on Việt Cộng activities. An ambush plan would then be developed. The twelve-day battalion search and destroy operation subsequently commenced on 4 August 1967, within AO Lion, 9 kilometres (5.6 mi) north-west of Núi Đất. In an attempt to achieve surprise the rifle companies moved into their respective areas of operation by foot, rather than by helicopter, carrying five days rations and supplies to reduce the need for resupply and the likelihood of detection by the Việt Cộng. With stealth considered key to the operation it was intended that any bunkers and camps located during the patrol phase of the operation would not be destroyed until after the ambush phase. Regardless, the Australians expected only to encounter rear guard elements.

Fire Support Base Giraffe was subsequently established with the new 105-millimetre (4.1 in) M2A2 Howitzers of 106th Field Battery and 81-millimetre (3.2 in) mortars from Mortar Platoon, 7 RAR providing indirect fire support, while elements of the Australian Reinforcement Holding Unit provided protection. (Note: The 105 mm L5 Pack Howitzers were replaced by M2A2s in June and July 1967, increasing the firepower available to the Australian task force.) Further support was provide by 155-millimetre (6.1 in) M109 self-propelled medium guns from the US 2/35th Artillery Regiment, while American 8-inch (200 mm) and 175-millimetre (6.9 in) heavy artillery were also available if required. Meanwhile, elements of 1st Field Squadron, Royal Australian Engineers had been tasked with clearing Route 2 of vegetation and rubber north of Núi Đất and D Company, 2 RAR was attached for the operation, providing security for the engineers and additional protection to the fire support base in conjunction with a troop of M113 armoured personnel carriers from A Squadron, 3rd Cavalry Regiment which would support the infantry during the day. (Note: V Company, 2 RAR/NZ later relieved D Company in support of Operation Ballarat.)

== Battle ==
=== Insertion and patrolling, 5–6 August ===
A Company, 7 RAR had already been patrolling in the Hát Dịch since 3 August when the orders for the operation were issued. Utilising an insertion technique perfected by the Special Air Service Regiment they were subsequently re-supplied early on the evening of 5 August, with the supplies successfully unloaded and the helicopters departing within three minutes. The covert infiltration of the infantry companies went undetected, and on the morning of 6 August A Company began to patrol towards the intended site of their initial patrol base. Under the command of Major Ewart O'Donnell, by-mid morning the Australians were approximately 10 kilometres (6.2 mi) east of Phu My. At 10:40, moving north-west with 2 Platoon leading, the Australians crossed a creek, the Suối Châu Pha, and shortly afterwards located a fresh track which had only recently been used. O'Donnell ordered the lead platoon into ambush positions astride the track, while he moved forward to conduct a reconnaissance. Minutes later two Việt Cộng sentries walked into the ambush with their weapons slung, and they were killed instantly by a short burst from an M60 machine-gun, likely surprised by the silent insertion of the Australians.

The incident alerted the remainder of the Australians and the company prepared for action. Considering it unlikely that the dead men had been alone, O'Donnell assessed that the remainder of a Việt Cộng squad was located somewhere further along the track and he subsequently requested artillery fire to block any escape, while 2 Platoon was ordered to sweep forward. Under the command of Second Lieutenant Graham Ross, 2 Platoon commenced its advance before coming under automatic fire 100 metres (110 yd) along the track by a Việt Cộng squad which then went to ground after the Australians returned fire. Attempting to take the initiative, Ross began to manoeuvre for a quick attack, moving two sections to the high ground on the right flank, while the third section provided fire support. Meanwhile, the Việt Cộng force, which turned out to be larger than first thought by the Australians, also attempted a flanking manoeuvre, moving one squad into a defensive position while two squads moved to their left flank. Deploying to the high ground at about the same time the two assault groups came face to face and a fierce fire-fight followed at close range, with both sides throwing grenades in an attempt to gain the initiative. Two Australians were killed and several more were wounded in the initial clashes.

2 Platoon was in trouble and the Australians were forced to fight hard in order to survive, with numerous acts of heroism on both sides. Repeatedly exposing himself to the fire to throw grenades and to direct his platoon's fire, Ross dragged two of his wounded men to safety during the fighting and despite being wounded in the leg by shrapnel he refused to be treated until the other wounded had received first aid. Meanwhile, Private Dennis Bathersby, although wounded in the right arm, remained behind his M60 throwing two grenades with his left arm and only withdrawing in order to drag another wounded Australian to safety. Finally, after his right arm went numb, Ross ordered Bathersby to hand over his machine-gun and he was evacuated to the rear. Elsewhere, Private Keith Downward, one of the forward scouts, after edging forward to within 10 metres (11 yd) then single-handedly charged one of the Việt Cộng machine-guns, killing the operator and capturing the weapon before then dragging a wounded Australian soldier out of danger despite himself being wounded. Amid the chaos, a wasp nest in a nearby tree was disturbed, and a number of Australians were so badly stung that they were incapacitated and also needed to be evacuated.

=== Move and counter-move, 6 August 1967 ===
O'Donnell attempted to probe the Việt Cộng flank, and after locating it on the high ground he committed 1 Platoon—under Second Lieutenant Rod Smith—to conduct a right flanking attack. Beginning at 11:30 the Australian assault soon ran into another Việt Cộng platoon conducting a similar manoeuvre, and they became involved in an intense battle at close quarters with each side blocking the manoeuvre of the other. A heavy monsoon rain began, drenching the men as they faced each other at a range of just 30 metres (33 yd), with seven Việt Cộng machine-guns facing six Australian machine-guns at the height of the battle as the two Việt Cộng platoons clashed with two Australian platoons. The Australians suffered heavily, losing two section commanders killed and a dozen men wounded in the first few minutes. The fighting continued for another two hours as both forces traded shots, with neither the Australians nor the Việt Cộng able to achieve a decisive advantage.

A Company's forward observer, Lieutenant Neville Clark, a Citizens Military Force (CMF) officer, had moved to the forward platoon and proceeded to calmly direct artillery from the guns at Fire Support Base Giraffe on to the Việt Cộng. Meanwhile, the Việt Cộng attempted to use "hugging tactics" to remain in close contact under the artillery barrage, while utilising rockets, grenades, machine-guns and small arms to inflict casualties on the Australians. Finally, with the communists massing for an all-out attack Clark adjusted the artillery to within 50 metres (55 yd) of his own position, disregarding his own safety in order to break up the attack. Firing from over 10,000 metres (11,000 yd) away, the Australian 105 mm howitzers were nearly at their 11,000-metre (12,000 yd) maximum range, yet they proved to be highly accurate and the rounds caused heavy casualties among the assaulting troops as they stood up to charge the Australian positions, while a few Australians were also slightly wounded after one of the rounds struck a tree. In total, the 106th Field Battery and the supporting American battery of the US 2/35th Artillery Battalion fired 1,026 rounds in support of A Company during the fighting, while American 8-inch and 175 mm heavy artillery fired another 156 rounds. A number of airstrikes had also supported the Australians.

Australian casualties being evacuated to the 8th Field Ambulance at Núi Đất during the fighting.

By 14:30 the Việt Cộng commander finally made the decision to withdraw, with the artillery deciding the battle in favour of the Australians. O'Donnell had commanded the battle with cool resolve under constant fire throughout, setting the standard for his men and on one occasion he had run 30 metres (33 yd) through heavy fire to drag a wounded medic to safety. Withdrawing through the barrage and a number of airstrikes called in to pursue them, the Việt Cộng proceeded to drag their dead from the battlefield, having suffered crippling casualties. B Company, 7 RAR was subsequently inserted by helicopter into blocking positions to the north, however they made no contact and were unable to prevent the withdrawal. Numerous blood trails were later found as the Australians attempted to follow up the Việt Cộng.

Meanwhile, even as the battle had continued the evacuation of the Australian casualties had begun, with a number of Iroquois helicopters from No. 9 Squadron, Royal Australian Air Force (RAAF) under Squadron Leader Jim Cox, flying through heavy ground fire to complete the dust-off. Hindered by artillery fire and the dense foliage the operation proved difficult and Cox's aircraft was hit by heavy machine-gun fire, wounding him and an orderly on board. Safely landing the damaged aircraft he then directed the operation by radio from the ground. Among the worst of the casualties was Sergeant Alexander Sutherland, from 2 Platoon. Losing an eye and suffering heavy blood loss from multiple shrapnel wounds after a Việt Cộng rocket exploded within a metre of him, he was evacuated to 8 Field Ambulance in Vung Tau with no pulse. His left leg later amputated, his wounds were so bad he had to be given a general anaesthetic each time his bandages were changed. Making a miraculous recovery however, he was personally recommended for the US Medal of Honor by Westmoreland for his resolute spirit, although this was later reduced to a lesser Australian award. Many casualties were beyond help however, and the battalion chaplain was inserted by winch from a helicopter to administer last rites.

On the basis of documents captured by the Australians during the battle the Việt Cộng were identified as being from C12 Company, 3rd Battalion, 274th Regiment, probably assisted by the battalion Reconnaissance Platoon and a number of local force guides. It was assessed that at least a second company had helped in the recovery of many of the Việt Cộng dead. Later, during operations the following day, a recently occupied battalion-sized camp was subsequently located about 900 metres (980 yd) from the site of the battle, and it was considered likely that the Việt Cộng company had fought the vigorous action in order the delay the Australians and enable the withdrawal of the remainder of the battalion from their base camp. Meanwhile, elements of the Chau Duc District Company were also believed to be located in the area. (Note: Two Việt Cộng soldiers from the Chau Duc District Company were later killed and two wounded during a subsequently contact with 4 Platoon, B Company on 13 August.)

== Aftermath ==
=== Casualties ===
Australian casualties had been heavy with five killed, one died of wounds and 20 wounded. (Note: Some discrepancies in Australian casualties exist between sources. The figures given are from the official history, while other figures include 17 or 19 wounded.) Meanwhile, the extent of Việt Cộng casualties were difficult to assess, as most had been removed from the battlefield by the communists as they had during previous battles. A sweep of the area by the Australians subsequently resulted in the recovery of a further five dead Việt Cộng, however drag marks and extensive blood trails indicated that they had suffered heavily, with perhaps another 33 killed or wounded in the contact. A further 200 casualties were estimated to have occurred from artillery and mortar fire, as well as a number of airstrikes. (Note: Most sources state that only five Việt Cộng bodies were recovered, although one states that 10 were located during the sweep.) Terry Burstall, in his controversial book Vietnam – The Australian Dilemma, lists these casualties as "possibles" only, questioning the efficacy of the Australian reporting. However Burstall's agenda and research methodology have been widely criticised, and official records make it clear that five bodies were indeed counted, while a further five bodies were observed but not recovered. Among the dead were one officer, believed to have been the platoon commander, and two non-commissioned officers. Also recovered were a light machine-gun, a 40 mm recoilless rifle and three AK-47 assault rifles, while other weapons, a quantity of rice and a battalion-sized bunker system were subsequently also captured.

=== Assessment ===
A classic encounter battle, the action had been fought between two forces of roughly equal size in the heavy monsoon rain at close quarters. Both companies had deployed to the high ground at around the same time in a bid to outflank the other, with the Australian infantry skilfully using their supporting artillery while the Việt Cộng had attempted to nullify the Australian tactics by remaining in close contact. Ultimately, the artillery had decided the outcome in favour of the Australians however, and the Việt Cộng had been forced to withdraw with heavy casualties. In this way the fighting bore many similarities to the victory twelve months earlier at Long Tân, yet it remained largely unheralded in Australia. Eight Australian soldiers received gallantry awards for their actions, including Military Crosses to O'Donnell, Ross and Clark, while Sutherland was awarded the Distinguished Conduct Medal. A number of awards were also made to the RAAF pilots and aircrew, including Cox who was awarded the Distinguished Flying Cross. Meanwhile, the bravery evident by the Việt Cộng during the battle had also made an impression on the Australians, who later acknowledged their tight fire discipline and the skilfulness of their battle drills and tactics which they found to be similar to those used by the Australians themselves.

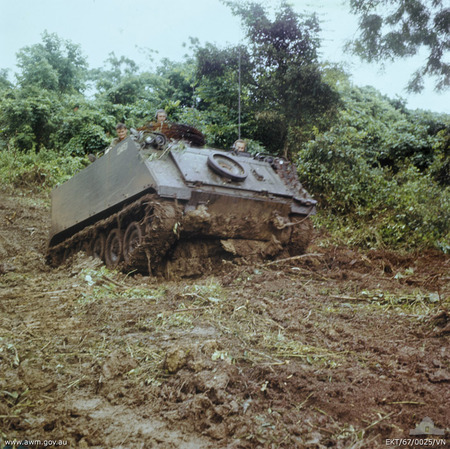
Australian M113 APC during the later stages of Operation Ballarat, 9 August 1967.

A month after disappearing the Việt Cộng 274th Regiment had emerged without warning and had caught 7 RAR by surprise, with the unexpected presence of a Việt Cộng Main Force regiment in the Hát Dịch forcing the Australians to change their tactics for the remainder of Operation Ballarat. The Australians became more cautious as a result and while 7 RAR continued its search and destroy mission, only two companies patrolled while the other two remained on standby in fire support bases nearby to provide support if required. Additional artillery support was also made available, with 161st Field Battery, Royal New Zealand Artillery airlifted into Fire Support Base Giraffe. Meanwhile, Graham placed 2 RAR on standby to fly into the area if needed and US forces were also positioned to the north. In this manner Ballarat continued until 16 August, however there was only minor contact which resulted in two more Việt Cộng killed, two wounded and one captured for no further loss to the Australians.

=== Subsequent operations ===
Australian operations in Phước Tuy province continued throughout the remainder of 1967, and although they were largely successful at the tactical level, the Việt Cộng continued to be able to enter most of the villages in the province, and were causing increasingly heavy Allied casualties with mines lifted from the controversial barrier minefield laid by the Australians. Operation Santa Fe, a further large-scale joint US-Australian operation, took place between October and November, but it too ended with only limited success in comparison to the resources committed. (Note: Australian involvement in Operation Santa Fe (27 October – 18 November) resulted in 38 Việt Cộng killed, nine wounded and one captured. Australian casualties included three killed and eight wounded. By the time American forces ended the operation on 5 January 1968 a total of 126 Việt Cộng had been killed and 32 captured, while the communist logistic network had been heavily disrupted, tonnes of supplies captured and thousands of bunkers and installations destroyed.) Meanwhile, despite allegations of corruption and ballot rigging by the ruling military junta, South Vietnam's presidential elections in September had been unhampered by security concerns and were largely considered successful, with 83 percent of eligible voters turning out nationwide; in Phước Tuy this number was higher still at over 90 percent. (Note: Figures for voter participation in Phước Tuy vary with the official history claiming that "over 90 per cent of registered voters in the province had turned out", while another study of the elections claims the figure was only 88.4 percent. Ham claims that "in Phuoc Tuy [sic] 91 per cent took part, the largest proportion of any province". However, if the lower figures in Penniman are accepted at least 10 other provinces had a higher turn out.) Graham believed that the large public turnout in Phước Tuy had been due to the long-term effects of Australian operations in the province which had increased the population's sense of security. As a result, 1 ATF now turned its attention to expanding its area of operations.

However, with the war approaching a stalemate strategically, the Australians were substantially reinforced following the trend of further American troop increases, with a third infantry battalion arriving in December, while a squadron of Centurion tanks and additional Iroquois helicopters were added in early 1968. Total Australian strength in Vietnam grew to over 8,000 men, its highest level during the war, effectively doubling the combat power available to the task force commander. Likewise, American military strength in Vietnam had risen to 486,000 men while South Vietnamese forces had expanded to 643,000 by the end of the year. In spite of this build up North Vietnamese strength in South Vietnam also increased growing to 278,000 men, and although communist strategy remained fundamentally one of protracted war, preparations for a strategic offensive had reached an advanced stage. Culminating in the Tết Offensive in early 1968, the offensive would aim to provoke a popular general uprising among the South Vietnamese people against the government and its American supporters and would take the form of a massive simultaneous surprise attack on population centres throughout South Vietnam. 1 ATF would be heavily involved in the fighting during Tet, deploying astride communist lines of communication in support of American and South Vietnamese forces defending the Long Bình-Biên Hòa complex north-east of Saigon during Operation Coburg, while also repelling repeated Việt Cộng attacks against Bà Rịa and Long Điền in Phước Tuy province.

== Notes ==
Footnotes

Citations
