= Operation Camden (1969) =

- Part of Vietnam War
Date	21 August 1969
Location	Hat Dich, Phuoc Tuy Province, Republic of Vietnam
Result	Australian victory

Belligerents
Australia	Viet Cong

Commanders and leaders
Bill Grassick; John James	Unknown

Casualties and losses
1 killed 36 wounded	13 killed 25 wounded

Operation Camden was an Australian Army in support of the 501 Land Clearing Company, United States Army Corps of Engineers who were undertaking land clearing operations in the Hat Dich area. A large contact took place on 21 August 1969 during Operation Camden south of the Hat Dich Secret Zone in Phuoc Tuy Province against Viet Cong forces. The battle was fought between 3 Platoon and the Assault Pioneer Platoon of the 5th Battalion, Royal Australian Regiment (5RAR) and the Viet Cong 3rd Battalion, 274th Regiment.
