= Operation Bribie =

1967 battle in Vietnam (aka Battle of Ap My An)

Coordinates: 10°27′00″N 107°17′00″E

- Part of the Vietnam War
- Australian soldiers from 6 RAR being picked up by helicopter during Operation Bribie, 17 February 1967.
| Date | 17–18 February 1967 |
| Location | Ap My An, Phuoc Tuy Province, South Vietnam |
| Result | Inconclusive |

Belligerents
| Australia; New Zealand; United States | Viet Cong; North Vietnam |

Commanders and leaders
| (Australia) Colin Townsend | Unknown |

Units involved
| (Australia) 6 RAR | D445 Battalion |

Strength
| ~300 men 11 APCs; 6 field guns | ~250 men |

Casualties and losses
| (Australia) 8 killed (Australia) 27 wounded (Australia) 1 APC destroyed | US/Australian claims: 8 bodies recovered 50–70 believed killed |

Operation Bribie (17–18 February 1967), also known as the Battle of Ap My An, was fought during the Vietnam War in Phuoc Tuy province between Australian forces from the 6th Battalion, Royal Australian Regiment (6 RAR) and two companies of Viet Cong from D445 Battalion, likely reinforced by North Vietnamese regulars. During the night of 16 February the Viet Cong attacked a South Vietnamese Regional Force compound at Lang Phuoc Hai, before withdrawing the following morning after heavy fighting with South Vietnamese forces. Two hours later, a Viet Cong company was reported to have formed a tight perimeter in the rainforest 2 kilometres (1.2 mi) north of Lang Phuoc Hai, near the abandoned hamlet of Ap My An. In response, the Australians deployed a quick reaction force. Anticipating that the Viet Cong would attempt to withdraw, as they had during previous encounters, forces from the 1st Australian Task Force (1 ATF) were inserted to block the likely withdrawal route in the hope of intercepting and destroying them.

On the afternoon of 17 February, American UH-1 Iroquois helicopters and M113 armoured personnel carriers (APCs) deployed 6 RAR into the area north-west of Hoi My. Following an airmobile assault into an unsecured landing zone at 13:45, A Company 6 RAR was surprised by a strong, well-sited and dug-in Viet Cong force – which, rather than withdrawing, had likely remained in location in an attempt to ambush any reaction force sent to the area. The Australians were soon hit by heavy small arms fire, with a third of the lead platoon falling wounded in the initial volleys. A Company subsequently broke contact and withdrew under heavy fire from what appeared to be a Viet Cong base area. Initially believing they were opposed by only a company, 6 RAR subsequently launched a quick attack by two companies. However, unknown to the Australians, the Viet Cong had been reinforced and they now faced a battalion-sized force in well prepared positions.

At 15:35, supported by air strikes, armour, and fire from A Company, B Company assaulted the position. From the outset, lead elements came under constant Viet Cong sniper fire from the trees, and from previously undetected machine-guns. The assault soon faltered, with steadily increasing casualties as the Viet Cong withstood multiple frontal assaults, including bayonet charges by two separate platoons. Surrounded and receiving fire from all sides, the lead Australian elements from B Company could advance no further against the determined dug-in force; all attempts to regain momentum failed to dislodge the defenders. Initially, the Australians used their APCs to secure the landing zone at the jungle's edge, but when the infantry was in trouble they were dispatched as a relief force. Fighting their way forward, the M113s finally arrived by 18:15 and began loading the most seriously wounded as darkness approached. The Viet Cong subsequently launched two successive counter-attacks, both repulsed by the Australians. During the fighting, one of the APCs was disabled by a recoilless rifle at close range, killing the driver.

By 19:00, after a five-hour battle, B Company broke contact and withdrew into a night harbour near the landing zone with the remainder of the battalion. Mortars, artillery fire and airstrikes covered their withdrawal, then pounded the battlefield into the evening. After a tense night, the Australians returned in the morning to find the Viet Cong had left the area, dragging most of their dead and wounded with them while avoiding a large blocking force. A hard-fought affair at close range, the disciplined Viet Cong force matched the Australians as both sides stood their ground, inflicting heavy casualties on each other, before each fell back. Although 6 RAR ultimately prevailed, the vicious fighting at Ap My An was probably the closest the Australian Army came to a major defeat during the war.

== Background ==
=== Military situation ===
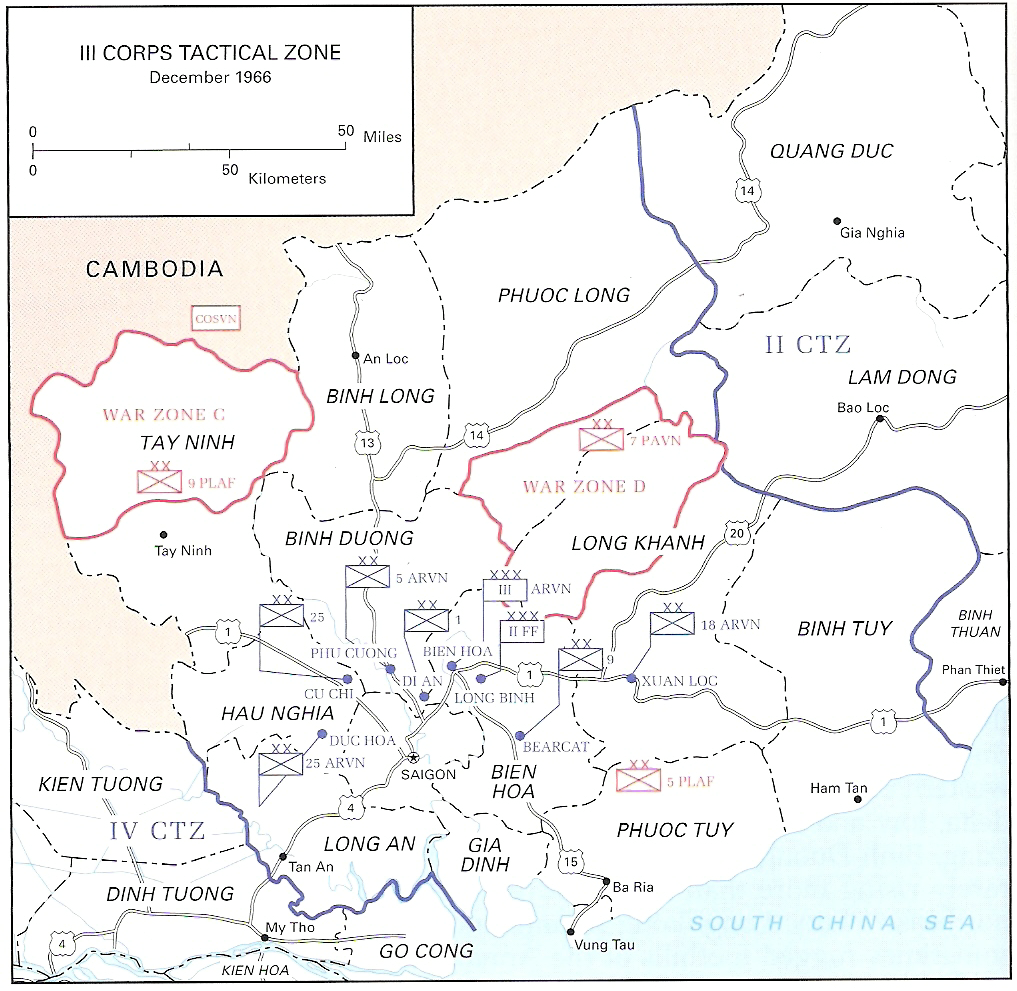
III Corps Tactical Zone, December 1966

The Australian victory at the Battle of Long Tan on 18 August 1966 proved to be a major local set back for the Viet Cong, indefinitely forestalling an imminent movement against the Australian base at Nui Dat and challenging their previous domination of Phuoc Tuy province. In the months that followed the two infantry battalions of the 1st Australian Task Force (1 ATF)—5th Battalion, Royal Australian Regiment (5 RAR) and 6th Battalion, Royal Australian Regiment (6 RAR)—had conducted a number of search and destroy, village cordon and search, and route security operations in an attempt to further extend their control, and to separate the local people from the influence of the Viet Cong. Such operations usually resulted in contacts between the Australians and small groups of Viet Cong, while during cordon and search operations of Binh Ba and Hoa Long a number of villagers suspected of sympathising with the communists were apprehended and handed over to the South Vietnamese authorities. Several search operations were also conducted by the Australians in areas suspected of containing Viet Cong base camps, and these often resulted in the discovery of recently used and quickly evacuated camps, hospitals and logistic bases which had then been destroyed. Meanwhile, both battalions had also continued an extensive patrolling and ambushing program around the task force base at Nui Dat.

By December 1966 some Australian officers, including Lieutenant Colonel John Warr, the 5 RAR commanding officer, had begun to reassess their operational aims. Warr argued that they should move away from conventional operations and instead focus on population control and disrupting communist supply lines and freedom of movement. Assessing that with just two infantry battalions 1 ATF did not have the strength to destroy the Viet Cong forces then in Phuoc Tuy, Warr favoured cordon and search operations to eliminate cadres and block the supply of rice from the villages. On 7 January 1967, Brigadier David Jackson was replaced as Commander 1 ATF by Brigadier Stuart Graham, and he subsequently approved Warr's proposed concept of operations. Two days later 5 RAR conducted a successful cordon and search of the village of Binh Ba as part of Operation Caloundra, screening 1,500 villagers and interrogating 591. Nine confirmed members of the Viet Cong were captured, while five draft dodgers were also detained. By mid-afternoon the operation had concluded without a shot being fired.

The Australians considered the operation a complete success and its results were largely seen to vindicate their evolving tactics, techniques and procedures. In the following months 5 RAR continued to develop cordon and search procedures as 1 ATF attempted to extend its influence, with such operations proving significant in weakening the Viet Cong infrastructure and removing a number of villages from their control. In this manner the Australians had continued to operate independently within Phuoc Tuy province, and while the war had become a series of big unit search and destroy operations in a war of attrition for the Americans, they had pursued their own counter-insurgency campaign. Regardless, differences of opinion between Australian and American methods had produced friction, and increasingly impatient with the Australian approach, in early-1967 the Commander US Military Assistance Command Vietnam, General William Westmoreland, had complained to the Commander Australian Forces Vietnam, Major General Tim Vincent, demanding a more aggressive approach. However, the Australians were convinced that deliberate patrolling techniques were more effective in separating the Viet Cong from the population in the villages while working towards slowly extending government control, and such urgings went largely unheeded.

In February 1967 1 ATF focused on the Dat Do area and the south-east of Phuoc Tuy province, initiating a program of conventional operations and pacification, with 5 RAR concentrating on cordon and search and civic action against Viet Cong cadres in the villages, while 6 RAR was tasked with search and destroy missions targeting the Viet Cong D445 Battalion. During the first week 6 RAR conducted ambushes along Route 23 between Dat Do and the Suoi Tre river, pre-empting Viet Cong attacks in the area during the Tet holiday. The results of this operation were modest, and the Australians suffered a number of casualties from a misplaced fire mission from the 161st Battery, Royal New Zealand Artillery which killed four and wounded 13, including Warrant Officer Class Two Jack Kirby, who had earlier received the Distinguished Conduct Medal for his actions at Long Tan, and was among the dead. Meanwhile, 5 RAR continued its cordon and search operations. On 13–14 February the battalion completed a cordon and search of An Nhut, just west of Dat Do, with South Vietnamese forces, apprehending 14 Viet Cong suspects, five communist sympathisers, two South Vietnamese Army (ARVN) deserters and a draft dodger. The Australians again suffered heavy casualties after the officer commanding C Company, his second-in-command, and a New Zealand artillery forward observer were killed by an unrecorded ARVN mine. Regardless, these operations met with some success, and over a six-day period the battalion captured 40 Viet Cong. Yet even as Graham continued to refine his strategy the Viet Cong struck, and this sudden initiative would force the Australians into the type of conventional engagement that Westmoreland had been advocating.

== Prelude ==
=== Opposing forces ===
Based at Nui Dat in the III Corps Tactical Zone as part of US II Field Force, Vietnam, 1 ATF included two infantry battalions plus armour, aviation, engineers and artillery support, with total Australian troop strength in Vietnam reaching 6,300 men. Logistic arrangements were provided by the 1st Australian Logistic Support Group based at the port of Vung Tau. Meanwhile, People's Army of Vietnam (PAVN) units operating in the province in early-1967 included Main Forces from the 5th Division, which consisted of the 274th and 275th Regiments, each of three infantry battalions under the command of Senior Colonel Nguyen The Truyen. Supporting this force were a number of artillery, engineer, medical and logistic units. Group 89 (Artillery) was equipped with recoilless rifles, medium mortars and heavy machine-guns. Local Forces included D445 Battalion, a provincial unit normally operating in the south of the province and in Long Khanh, while guerrilla forces included two companies in the Chau Duc district, one in Long Dat and a platoon in Xuyen Moc; in total around 4,500 men. Australian intelligence assessed the division as capable of conducting a regimental-sized harassing raid against Nui Dat, while at the same time using its second regiment for ambushes, decoys or other supporting tasks. 274th Regiment was believed capable of inflicting heavy casualties on units up to a battalion, while 275th Regiment was assessed as only having the capability to attack isolated outposts or conduct limited ambushes and was unlikely to attempt a major attack without the support of 274th Regiment. Overall, it lacked the ability to conduct a protracted division-sized operation, although one regiment could likely reinforce the other within a period of eight hours. Yet even while the possibility of a divisional attack against Nui Dat was considered remote, the threat of raids up to regimental strength forced Graham to maintain a defensive posture. Yet lacking a third infantry battalion, 1 ATF's operational strength was limited. D445 Battalion was thought capable of mortaring, harassing fire and quick raids and was likely to be able to inflict heavy casualties on forces up to company size.

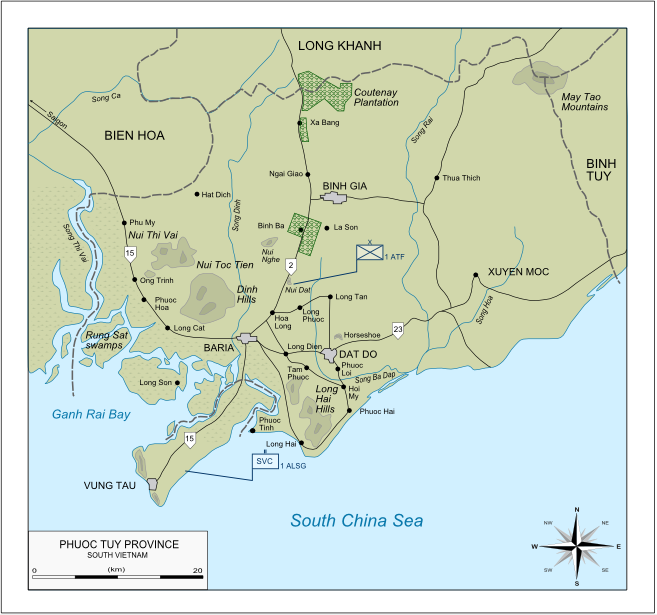
Phuoc Tuy Province, South Vietnam

During the night of 16/17 February 1967 a Viet Cong force, likely from D445 Battalion, had attacked a South Vietnamese Regional Force (RF) post occupied by 612 RF Company, located 15 kilometres (9.3 mi) south-east of Nui Dat near Hoi My, in the vicinity of the coastal village of Lang Phuoc Hai on the South China Sea. 1 ATF was first alerted to the Viet Cong movement against Lang Phuoc Hai in the early hours of the following morning by the senior American advisor in Phuoc Tuy, Lieutenant Colonel Jack Gilham. At 02:30, Major Gordon Murphy, Officer Commanding A Squadron, 3rd Cavalry Regiment, was woken to be informed that the RF post there was under attack from a Viet Cong force of at least one company. A reaction force was likely to be requested from 1 ATF, and Murphy's armoured personnel carriers (APCs) would also be required. Shortly after 05:00 Gilham advised that the Viet Cong—now estimated at two companies—had occupied Lang Phuoc Hai and had subsequently entered the nearby hamlet of Lo Gom, and were attempting to collect boats in order to withdraw from the area by sea. Murphy was warned to have a troop of APCs ready by 06:00 to move the task force standby rifle company from 5 RAR to the area in order to relieve the South Vietnamese outpost. 3 Troop was immediately reacted to collect the company. Only recently arrived in Vietnam, Murphy had taken over command just the previous evening. Regardless, he believed that it would be unwise to send a reaction force down Route 44 as it would be too predictable, while in the near darkness the APC crews would be unable to effectively respond to any Viet Cong ambush. Graham subsequently agreed with Murphy's objections, and the Australians began planning a more deliberate response.

At 05:30 Gilham urgently requested the Australian APCs be at a compound in Dat Do by 06:45 in order to transport an ARVN company. However, as the events unfolded A Squadron was not required for this operation, while 3 Troop was also recalled and the original order to load the task force standby rifle company was rescinded. As reports of the fighting around Lang Phuoc Hai continued, Headquarters 1 ATF struggled to respond amid delays and confusion. Difficulties in obtaining American assault helicopters and intelligence reports of a possible attack on the task force base by the Viet Cong 5th Division further hampered planning. Meanwhile, Operation Renmark—a 5 RAR operation planned to begin in the Long Hai hills the following day—was postponed, while arrangements were made to move the guns of the 101st Field Battery by CH-47 Chinook helicopters to a temporary fire support base near Dat Do, in order to provide fire support to the reaction force which would be out of range of the guns at Nui Dat. Meanwhile, heavy fighting ensured between the Viet Cong and South Vietnamese near Lo Gom, as 615 RF Company from Xa Phuoc Loi and an ARVN battalion from Dat Do—the 3/43rd Infantry Battalion, entered the battle. By 09:35 the RF company was surrounded by the Viet Cong, now in battalion strength. However, supported by American airstrikes and artillery, the South Vietnamese successfully fought their way out, and by 10:10 the Viet Cong were reported to have withdrawn north-east to the clear rainforest strip known to the Australians as the "Light Green", after suffering heavy casualties during five hours of fighting. (Note: The area was so named due to the colour used to depict it on Australian maps.)

Two hours later, a Viet Cong company was reported to have formed a tight perimeter in the jungle 2 kilometres (1.2 mi) north of Lang Phuoc Hai, near the abandoned hamlet of Ap My An. Believed to be from D445 Battalion, in spite of repeated airstrikes the force had remained in location and appeared to be attempting to cover the withdrawal of the main Viet Cong force to the east with heavy machine-gun fire. The Australians assessed that, after having extended their night attack into daylight, the Viet Cong would now attempt to leave the battlefield in small parties before pulling-back to their jungle bases. Yet Graham hoped to inflict a heavy defeat on the Viet Cong to boost the morale of the South Vietnamese territorial forces by demonstrating that they could not be attacked with impunity. Considering that the Viet Cong would attempt to withdraw as they had during previous encounters, forces from the 1 ATF would subsequently be inserted into blocking positions on the likely withdrawal route in an attempt to intercept and destroy them. A swift reaction was required in order to prevent the anticipated withdrawal and Graham subsequently decided on a full battalion operation with APCs in support, aimed at cutting-off the Viet Cong's likely withdrawal route to the east. Yet incomplete information and the need to conform to timings dictated by the limited availability of American helicopters for the insertion resulted in further delays.

== Battle ==
=== Encounter battle at the landing zone, 17 February 1967 ===
Viet Cong soldiers, believed to be from D445 Battalion.

Lieutenant Colonel Colin Townsend, the commanding officer of 6 RAR, was called to the task force command post for a briefing at 10:20. Townsend subsequently issued verbal orders to deploy the battalion at 11:30, and 6 RAR subsequently launched a quick reaction force code named Operation Bribie. The plan envisioned C Company, under the command of Major Brian McFarlane, being inserted by M113 APCs from A Squadron, 3rd Cavalry Regiment to secure a helicopter landing zone—known as LZ Amber—3 kilometres (1.9 mi) east of Hoi My, just north of the hamlet of Ap My An. (Note: 6 RAR had already been preparing for an operation in the area at the time, and LZ Amber had been identified as part of the planning for it. Due to its proximity to the "Light Green" it was subsequently used for Operation Bribie instead.) A, B and D Companies would then be flown into LZ Amber by American UH-1 Iroquois helicopters. The battalion would then link up and establish a blocking position to prevent the Viet Cong withdrawing east, before patrolling westward to contact. In direct support were 105 mm M2A2 howitzers from the 101st Field Battery at the airstrip at Dat Do, which would subsequently be secured by A Company 5 RAR, while also supporting the operation were Bell H-13 Sioux light observation helicopters from the 161st Reconnaissance Flight and elements of the US 1st Battalion, 83rd Artillery Regiment. A New Zealand forward observation party was attached to the battery and would accompany B Company, 6 RAR. Due to the need to secure the task force base, 6 RAR would be required to return to Nui Dat before dark and this restriction would later impact heavily on the operation.

Over seven hours after Gilham's original request, at 12:35 the Australian APCs had finally departed Nui Dat under Murphy's command with C Company and the Mortar Platoon. Suspecting a Viet Cong ambush, Murphy had prudently avoided following the obvious route to Lang Phuoc Hai, travelling cross-country instead, moving through Long Dien and into the paddy fields parallel to Route 326. Yet the initial lack of artillery cover had slowed the movement of the 35-vehicle column, while the continual need to reduce speed while traversing the numerous paddy bunds en route was not appreciated beforehand and further hampered their progress. Indeed, while Murphy had correctly calculated that the rice fields would be dry and hard at that time of year, he found that the main obstacle to rapid movement was a 1-metre (3.3 ft) high paddy-bund every 30 to 100 metres (33 to 109 yd) at the edge of each rice field. Meanwhile, although the lead company in the air assault—A Company commanded by Major Max Carroll—had departed Nui Dat at 13:30 aboard fifteen UH-1 helicopters from a US Army aviation company, C Company had still not arrived in position to secure the landing zone.

Although unknown to the Australians at the time, the earlier attack on Lang Phuoc Hai had been a deliberate attempt by the Viet Cong to provoke a reaction from 1 ATF. As such there would be no withdrawal on this occasion. Anticipating that any relief force would move by road, the Viet Cong had subsequently established an extensive ambush in the buildings alongside Route 44, which led into the village itself. Although the presence of this trap was not detected by the Australians, Murphy's evasion had ensured that his APCs had avoided it, moving the infantry by a cross-country route instead. However, with C Company delayed as a result, A Company made their airmobile assault onto an unsecured landing zone at 13:45, supported only by indirect fire from the artillery at Dat Do in suppression, which was initially limited due to delay in setting up the fire support base. Under the command of Major Owen O'Brien, A Company then began to advance into the fringe of thick rainforest to secure the southern edge of the landing zone for the arrival of B Company and the remainder of the battalion. Finally, over 30 minutes after the lead company had flown in, the APCs began to receive sniper fire as they neared the landing zone.

A Company moved south, shaking out into an open formation across a frontage of 150 metres (160 yd), with 2 Platoon on the right and 3 Platoon on the left, while 1 Platoon was in depth. Already in the dense vegetation, 2 Platoon—under Second Lieutenant Graham Ackland—had only advanced 150 metres when a sniper was spotted in a tree and was subsequently shot by the platoon sergeant. Almost simultaneously, 3 Platoon was engaged with small arms fire, while behind them the company headquarters was engaged by more snipers. 2 Platoon assaulted straight into the main Viet Cong position with grenades and machine-guns. Breaking-in they moved forward, killing a number of Viet Cong in their weapon pits but suffering six casualties in less than a minute, with a third of the lead platoon falling wounded in the initial volleys. Pinned down and in trouble, Ackland realised that he was facing a sizable and well dug-in force and he attempted to move his sections into an all-round defensive perimeter in order to defend against any counter-attack; the Viet Cong did not attack however and instead remained in their pits. In an attempt to relieve 2 Platoon, O'Brien manoeuvred 1 and 3 Platoons, while requesting B Company support his right flank as soon as they arrived at the landing zone.

Arriving shortly after the initial contact, the lead platoon from B Company—5 Platoon under Second Lieutenant John O'Halloran—was forced to jump from their helicopters as they were unable to land after taking fire at the landing zone. The platoon quickly formed up and moved into the vegetation on the western edge of the landing zone, with the remainder of the company following them as they landed. Meanwhile, O'Brien estimated that A Company was facing at least a company dug-in across a 100 to 200 metres (110 to 220 yd) frontage, armed with five or six machine-guns. Unable to use artillery because of the helicopters still flying-in the remainder of the battalion, while the mortars were still with the APCs and had not yet arrived, O'Brien was without support and any further advance would not be possible. Unlike previous encounters during which the Viet Cong had attempted to avoid battle, the force now confronting A Company appeared to have no intention of withdrawing and was instead mounting an unexpectedly determined defence. The Australians suspected that this uncharacteristic willingness to fight during daylight indicated that the Viet Cong force may have been covering the withdrawal of their command elements. Under heavy fire from what appeared to be a Viet Cong base area, O'Brien extricated his platoons with difficulty and subsequently broke contact, withdrawing 250 metres (270 yd) with the wounded to the southern edge of the landing zone.

Only twenty minutes since the first contact, A Company had returned to its original position on the rainforest fringe, having suffered seven men wounded and using most of their ammunition. O'Brien subsequently briefed Townsend by radio, again reporting the Viet Cong position as a 'camp' of at least company-size, and proposing that A Company remain in location while B Company adopted a position on the right flank until the situation could be clarified, to which he agreed. Townsend subsequently arrived by helicopter as A Company's casualties were being evacuated by an Australian UH-1 Iroquois from No. 9 Squadron RAAF. Meanwhile, the APCs carrying C Company and the Mortar Platoon began to arrive, while D Company was inserted by helicopter a few minutes later and took up blocking positions in the tree-line north-east of the landing zone. Just after 14:30, B Company—under Major Ian Mackay—began receiving sniper fire in their position just south-west of A Company, and in response Mackay moved the company back before calling-in artillery fire onto the Viet Cong positions. Initially believing that he only faced a company-sized Viet Cong force, with his rifle companies now finally assembled, at 15:15 Townsend issued orders for a quick attack by two companies.

=== B Company 6 RAR quick attack fails, 17 February 1967 ===
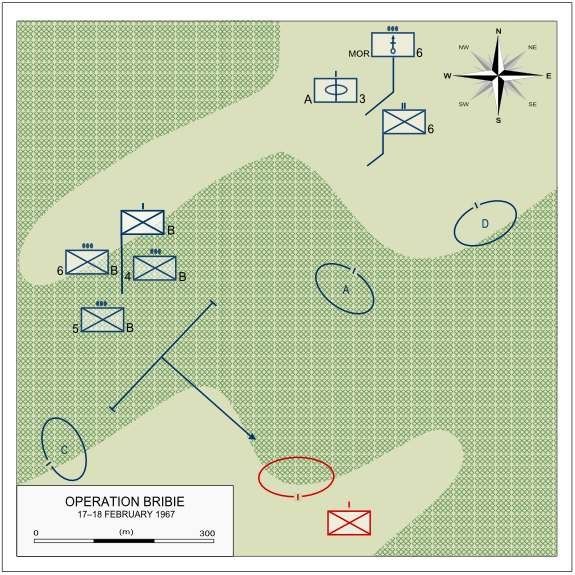
B Company 6 RAR quick attack, 17 February 1967

Townsend's plan envisioned A Company advancing south approximately 200 metres (220 yd) and engaging the Viet Cong in an attempt to split their fire and provide fire support, while B Company would move around from the right flank to launch the assault. Meanwhile, C Company would occupy a blocking position to the west, while D Company would be kept in reserve. B Company would then assault in a south-east direction on an axis that would take them across the front of A Company, which would require their fire to cut-out as they did so. The scheme of manoeuvre was based on the assumption that the Viet Cong position was a camp as previously reported, and not a defensive position, yet with visibility in the thick vegetation limited to between 10 and 30 metres (11 and 33 yd), few of the men from A Company had actually seen much of the position during the earlier fighting. Yet the Viet Cong had likely now been reinforced by North Vietnamese regulars from 275th Regiment and unknown to the Australians they now faced a battalion-sized force in well prepared positions.

The assault began at 15:35, with A Company beginning their advance into the rainforest with two platoons forward and one back. Meanwhile, B Company began forming up in single file on the right flank, also with two platoons forward in assault formation, while one remained in reserve at the rear. Each of the forward platoons covered a frontage of 100 metres (110 yd), with 4 Platoon—under the command of Second Lieutenant John Sullivan—on the left, and O'Halloran's 5 Platoon on the right. Company headquarters was located centrally, while 6 Platoon—commanded by Sergeant Butch Brady—was to the rear. Each platoon adopted a similar formation, with two sections forward and one back. From the outset the lead elements of B Company came under constant sniper fire from the trees, and from Viet Cong machine-guns that had not previously been detected by the Australians. Even as the company was shaking out they were engaged sporadically by a group of Viet Cong just 50 metres (55 yd) to their front, with one Australian soldier being hit before the attack began and later dying at the landing zone before he could be evacuated. B Company subsequently crossed the line of departure at 15:55, and two minutes later A Company began engaging the Viet Cong positions with small arms from their 7.62 mm M60 machine-guns and L1A1 Self Loading Rifles, and 5.56 mm M16 assault rifles in support.

As B Company moved forward, their left flank was engaged by a machine-gun from a small party of Viet Cong to their front, while sniper fire intensified. The Australians continued to advance with co-ordinated fire and movement, but were now receiving fire from three directions. Ten minutes after stepping off, B Company crossed the front of A Company, forcing them to cease their covering fire. Without support, the Australians were now assaulting a well dug-in and largely unseen Viet Cong force that was disposed in a wide arc. Penetrating the position, the Australian flanks were increasingly exposed to fire, while the dense undergrowth obscured the Viet Cong pits and reduced visibility to just a few metres. Both the lead Australian platoons were soon enveloped, as fire swept across the front of B Company from the Viet Cong engaging them with heavy machine-guns, claymore mines and light mortars. Meanwhile, Viet Cong snipers continued to engage the Australians from the rear, who unsuccessfully attempted to regain the initiative with small arms fire and grenades. The assault soon faltered with steadily increasing casualties.

The two forward Australian platoons subsequently lost contact with each other, while the left section of 4 Platoon was engaged by a 12.7 mm heavy machine-gun, and began to fall behind. The section on the right was also engaged by a machine-gun, and the frontage of the platoon subsequently broke. The section commander assaulted the Viet Cong position with an M79 grenade launcher, however he was unable to dislodge them. Meanwhile, on the right, 5 Platoon pressed their advance, and they subsequently pulled further ahead of the rest of B Company. At 16:25, with 5 Platoon now 40 metres (44 yd) in front and also receiving machine-gun fire from its front and right flank, Mackay finally ordered the platoon to halt as he attempted to manoeuvre the company to regain control of the situation. 6 Platoon was ordered to advance through 4 Platoon to assault the machine-gun on the left flank, before linking up with 5 Platoon and continuing the assault. Brady subsequently directed his men to fix bayonets and charge the Viet Cong positions, yet the attack was soon cut to pieces by machine-guns which engaged them from the centre and left and it was subsequently halted behind O'Halloran's rear section. Brady then requested mortar fire in support; however, the need to request air clearance only resulted in further delay. By 16:45 B Company's assault had bogged down due to the strong Viet Cong resistance. All of its platoons were in contact and unable to move, while company headquarters had advanced behind the lead platoons and was also pinned down.

As the fighting continued, D Company remained in a blocking position to the north-east of the landing zone. Meanwhile, after inserting C Company into its blocking position to the west, the APCs from A Squadron had moved into a harbour around the tree line, from where they covered the flanks of the rifle companies in the rainforest. Not included in the assault due to the belief that the terrain was unsuitable for armour, in their location the APCs were occasionally hit by overshooting rounds, but otherwise remained out of the battle. This assumption was later found to be incorrect though, and the APCs would likely have been able to move through the dense undergrowth, while the firepower provided by their .50 calibre machine-guns would have been able to assist B Company, which was pinned down. Regardless, the armament of the M113s would have likely proven inadequate for attacking strong defences and bunkers, and their light aluminium armour was known to be vulnerable to heavy machine-guns and RPGs. With both A and B Company now heavily engaged, Townsend subsequently asked Murphy whether his APCs could move around to the right in another attempt to outflank the Viet Cong; however, a creek made the ground in that area too boggy for the vehicles and this proved impractical. A close quarters battle then ensued, continuing until night fell with the Australians assaulting the Viet Cong positions using frontal tactics which resulted in heavy casualties on both sides.

=== Final assault and withdrawal overnight, 17/18 February 1967 ===
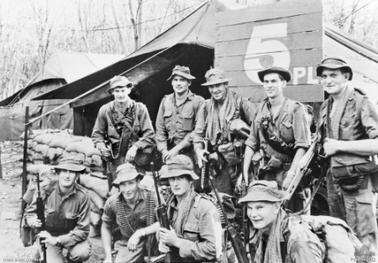
5 Platoon, B Company 6 RAR prior to Operation Bribie. Half the platoon became casualties during the fighting.

Under orders from Townsend to press on with the assault as fast as possible, Mackay decided to switch the B Company assault to the right flank, ordering O'Halloran by radio to advance a further 30 metres (33 yd) in order to outflank the Viet Cong machine-gun and allow 6 Platoon to resume its advance on the left flank. However, the machine-gun was soon found to be located a further 30 metres forward than expected, and 5 Platoon would need to assault 60 metres (66 yd) across open scrub under heavy fire in order to silence it. As O'Halloran relayed orders for the assault, machine-guns and snipers continued to engage them intermittently, and the Australians continued to return fire with small arms and grenades. Again fixing bayonets, on order the Australians rose as one and were almost immediately hit with heavy fire, with the forward line disintegrating as a result. The left forward section under Lance Corporal Kerry Rooney then advanced directly at the machine-gun located to their front, firing as they moved. Rooney then charged the position throwing grenades but was shot and killed within metres of the Viet Cong position. Suffering several more men wounded, the Australian left flank again became pinned down.

Meanwhile, the right forward section under Corporal Robin Jones attacked the Viet Cong at close range, inflicting heavy casualties on the defenders with grenades and small arms fire. However, three previously undetected Viet Cong machine-guns subsequently engaged 5 Platoon, which succeeded in breaking up the Australian attack on the right flank with intense enfilade fire which killed three men and wounded five more. Of his section only Jones was left unwounded. For his leadership he was later awarded the Military Medal. The Australian assault stalled having covered just 25 metres (27 yd). Nearly half of the men in the forward sections had become casualties and the platoon stretcher bearer, Private Richard Odendahl repeatedly risked his life dragging men to safety, providing first aid, recovering weapons from the dead, and providing O'Halloran with information on the disposition of his platoon. For his actions Odendahl was also later awarded the Military Medal. Attempting to reinforce his threatened right flank, O'Halloran ordered the M60 machine-gun from his reserve section forward to support Jones while the wounded were recovered, however both the machine-gunner and his offsider were killed attempting to move forward. Surrounded by Viet Cong machine-guns and receiving fire from all sides, the lead Australian elements from B Company could advance no further against a determined and well dug-in force, and all attempts to regain momentum were unable to dislodge the defenders.

With the Australian and Viet Cong positions now too close to each other, O'Halloran could neither move forward nor withdraw. Artillery began to fire in support of the Australians, however it initially fell too far to the rear to be effective, and it had to be adjusted by the B Company forward observer, Captain Jim Ryan, himself under heavy fire. 5 Platoon was still in danger of becoming isolated and O'Brien now suggested he move A Company forward to assist B Company, however this was rejected by Mackay who feared the two companies clashing in the confusion. Meanwhile, O'Halloran called for the APCs to come forward to provide assistance, while the platoon sergeant—Sergeant Mervyn McCullough—guided a section from 6 Platoon forward to reinforce 5 Platoon, and begin evacuating the casualties. Bolstered by reinforcements and with accurate artillery covering fire O'Halloran now felt that he was in a position to extract his platoon. Yet at that moment two rounds from one of the howitzers fell short, and while one of the shells harmlessly exploded against a tree, the other landed just to the right of the 5 Platoon headquarters, killing two men and wounding eight others, including six of the seven reinforcements from 6 Platoon. Following an urgent radio call from O'Halloran, the artillery ceased fire. Shortly afterwards an RPG round hit the same area, wounding McCullough.

Townsend subsequently then reported that he was facing a force of at least battalion-strength with support weapons—likely D445 Battalion—while the level of proficiency indicated that it might also include North Vietnamese Army (NVA) elements. However, due to earlier warnings that the Viet Cong were preparing to attack Nui Dat that evening, prior to the start of the operation Graham had ordered Townsend to return to base that afternoon, and this restriction remained extant. Likewise, with Operation Renmark scheduled to start the following morning, A Company 5 RAR—then at Dat Do protecting the artillery—would also need to be released before nightfall, adding to the requirement to conclude the operation that afternoon. Regardless, this restriction had only served to make B Company's task all the more difficult, with Mackay facing demands to complete the action while at the same time not become decisively engaged and unable to withdraw his company. At 16:17 Townsend was ordered to prepare his battalion for a helicopter extraction which was due to begin an hour later, while at 17:15 he was ordered to break contact immediately, however this proved impossible as 5 Platoon remained in heavy contact. Mackay now estimated that he would be unable to get forward to support the beleaguered platoon for a further 30 minutes; however, by 17:50 he realised that the Viet Cong had moved between them and A Company. Yet even while the Viet Cong continued to heavily engage both A and B Companies, the remainder of the Australian battalion and the APCs were beginning to line up on the landing zone in preparation for returning to Nui Dat. The order was finally rescinded when it became clear that both companies were unable to break-off the engagement. Meanwhile, a number of bush fires were now burning through the area, detonating discarded ammunition and adding to the noise of the battle.

Initially the Australians had used their APCs to secure the landing zone at the jungle's edge, however with the infantry in trouble they were subsequently dispatched as a relief force. Three M113s from 2 Troop under Sergeant Frank Graham entered the rainforest shortly after 17:15; however, lacking clear directions to B Company's position 300 metres (330 yd) away, they fumbled around in the dense vegetation before locating A Company instead. Instructed by Mackay to head for the white smoke of the bush fire, in error the APCs then set out towards the most obvious smoke further to the south-east of B Company. A Viet Cong 75 mm recoilless rifle subsequently engaged the lead vehicle twice at close range, though both rounds missed, exploding in the trees nearby. Still unsure of B Company's location, Graham was unwilling to engage the Viet Cong position with heavy machine-guns for fear of hitting his own men, and the cavalry subsequently withdrew. Later it was discovered that the cavalry had likely been engaged by elements defending the Viet Cong headquarters. Meanwhile, due to the threat posed by the Viet Cong anti-tank weapons the remainder of 2 Troop then arrived under the command Second Lieutenant David Watts to provide added protection; in total 12 vehicles. A further attempt to reach B Company by the cavalry also failed however, after the A Company guide became disorientated in the thick vegetation. Mackay then threw coloured smoke, while Sioux helicopters arrived overhead to guide the vehicles to their position. B Company's casualties now amounted to seven men killed and 19 wounded.

Fighting their way forward, the M113s finally arrived by 18:15 and began loading the most badly wounded as darkness approached. The Viet Cong subsequently launched two successive counter-attacks, assaulting B Company from the east and south-east; however, both attacks were repulsed by the Australians, as they responded with small arms fire while Mackay called-in an airstrike. During the fighting one of the APCs was subsequently disabled by a recoilless rifle at close range, killing the driver and wounding the crew commander. A second round then struck the open cargo hatch, wounding several more men and re-wounding a number of the Australian casualties. A third round then landed nearby, as the M113s returned fire with their .30 and .50 calibre machine-guns. Under covering fire the Australians attempted to recover the damaged vehicle, yet it became stuck hard against a tree. With the Viet Cong threatening a further attack from the north-east, the Australian cavalry swept the area with a heavy volume of fire and were met by equally heavy return fire. By 18:50 the light was fading rapidly, while the bulk of 5 Platoon's more serious casualties had been evacuated by APC. However, with many of the Australian dead lying near the Viet Cong positions, no attempt was made to recover them due to the likelihood of further casualties. Meanwhile, the damaged APC was subsequently destroyed with white phosphorus grenades to prevent its weapons and equipment from being captured.

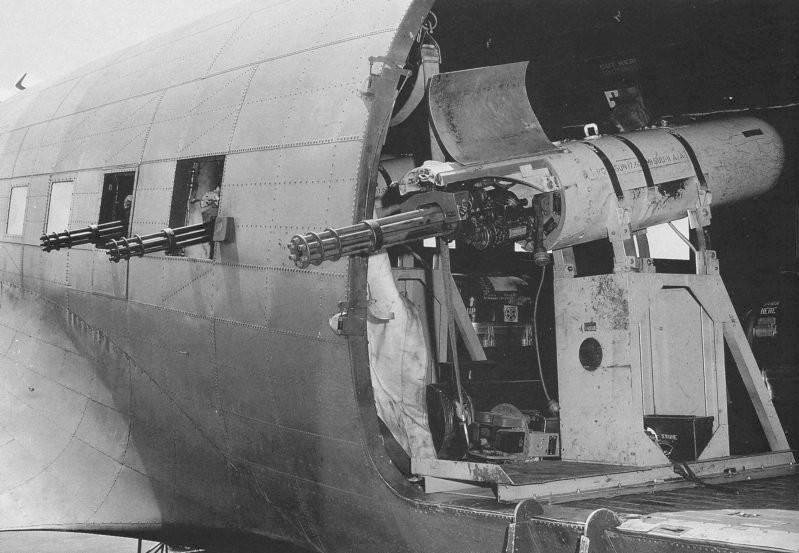
Armament of an AC-47 Spooky gunship, similar to that used during Operation Bribie.

Finally, by 19:00 B Company was able break contact and withdrew after a five-hour battle. Both sides then fell back as the Viet Cong also dispersed, evacuating most of their dead and wounded. Meanwhile, under covering fire from the APCs of 2 Troop, B Company boarded the remaining carriers, moving into a night harbour near the landing zone with the remainder of the battalion at 19:25, as the last of their casualties were extracted by helicopter. Mortars, artillery fire and airstrikes covered the Australian withdrawal, and then proceeded to pound the abandoned battlefield into the evening. That night the body of the dead APC driver was evacuated by helicopter, as American AC-47 Spooky gunships circled overhead, dropping flares to illuminate the battlefield and strafing likely Viet Cong positions, while F-4 Phantoms dropped napalm. The airstrikes then continued in preparation for a further assault by the Australians planned for the following day. Otherwise there was no further fighting that night, and both sides remained unmolested. Ultimately no attack was made against the Australian base at Nui Dat that night either, while no unusual activity was reported in the area.

=== Return to the battlefield, 18 February 1967 ===
After a tense night the Australians returned to the battlefield the following morning. At 09:30 on 18 February 6 RAR assaulted into the area on a broad front, with C and D Companies forward and A Company in reserve, while B Company and the APCs from A Squadron occupied a blocking position to the south. Anxious not to repeat the failure to follow up the retreating Viet Cong after Long Tan, from Saigon Vincent urged Graham to pursue D445 Battalion. Meanwhile, a large American force of over 100 armoured vehicles from the 2nd Battalion, US 47th Mechanised Infantry Regiment, supported by a battery of self-propelled guns and helicopters from the US 9th Division, attempted to cut-off likely Viet Cong escape routes. Having deployed in support of 1 ATF earlier that morning from Bearcat, 42 kilometres (26 mi) north-west of Nui Dat, the Americans subsequently cleared an area along the line of Route 23, 5 kilometres (3.1 mi) north-east of the battle-zone. Although constituting an impressive display of combat power, the Americans had arrived too late to affect the outcome of the battle, and no contacts occurred before they were withdrawn the following day. Meanwhile, the Australians conducted a sweep of the battlefield only to find that the Viet Cong had left the area during the night, successfully avoiding the large blocking force while dragging most of their dead and wounded with them.

During the sweep one of the missing Australians—Lance Corporal Vic Otway—was unexpectedly found alive, having spent the night near the Viet Cong after being wounded in both legs and falling just metres from the machine-gun he had been assaulting. Unable to answer calls from other members of his platoon for fear of being discovered, he was presumed to have been killed. Lying still for four hours, Otway had managed to crawl 70 metres (77 yd) to the rear after dark, before artillery fire and airstrikes began to fall on the area. Digging a shell scrape for protection from the American napalm strikes, he was subsequently wounded again by shrapnel. After first light he had continued to crawl back towards the Australian lines, but was confronted by a group of Viet Cong soldiers just 6 metres (6.6 yd) away. Otway attempted to fire on them, however his weapon jammed, and the Viet Cong had walked past him unaware of his presence. Continuing their search, the Australians then located and recovered the bodies of the six dead from 5 Platoon. Most had been burnt beyond recognition by napalm, while at least one had been stripped of his webbing and equipment. The burnt out APC was also recovered. On the side the Viet Cong had written "DU ME UC DAI LOI" in blood; loosely translated into English as "Get fucked Australians". Its destruction was subsequently completed by the cavalry and the burnt out hull was recovered to Nui Dat. (Note: According to Anderson the hull was recovered aboard a flatbed trailer; however, McNeill & Ekins state that it was towed back to Nui Dat.) At 10:35 A Squadron then undertook a thorough search of the area.

The bodies of six Viet Cong soldiers were also found by the Australians. Among the dead was the commander of C3 Company, D445 Battalion and his second-in-command, while others were identified as personnel from the command elements of the battalion and the heavy weapons company. Three of the dead were NVA soldiers, possibly from 275th Regiment, although this was not able to be confirmed. Many more bodies were thought to have been carried away, while one AK-47 assault rifle and a small quantity of ammunition and equipment was also located. The Viet Cong position was found to have been hastily prepared overnight, and consisted of well-sited, but shallow weapon pits rather than bunkers, approximately half of which had overhead protection. Assessed as a good night defensive position rather than a position designed for a deliberate defensive battle, it had been laid out in the shape of a half-moon; by the fortunes of war B Company had directly assaulted into the centre of the position. Yet the flat terrain had offered good fields of fire, while the dense vegetation provided excellent concealment. The Australians believed that the Viet Cong had withdrawn to the east, and B Company subsequently patrolled through the "Light Green" up to the small village of Ap Gia Thanh, 2 kilometres (1.2 mi) east, supported by the APCs, hooking south along the jungle tracks towards the swamps along the Song Rai river. Although signs of heavy foot traffic were obvious the Viet Cong had long since left the area, while no evidence of blood trails or discarded equipment were found, indicating an orderly retirement from the battlefield. B Company returned to Nui Dat by 17:30, while the remainder of 6 RAR was extracted by helicopter. The last APCs from A Squadron finally returned by 20:10 that evening as Operation Bribie concluded.

== Aftermath ==
=== Casualties ===
In the aftermath of the operation Hanoi declared that the Viet Cong had won a decisive victory, claiming to have inflicted heavy losses on the Australians. (Note: A communist propaganda pamphlet published several months after the battle later devoted the following paragraph to it: "In Baria, on February 16 [sic] the L.A.F knocked down 100 Australian troops and destroyed 5 tanks and M.113's engaged in a mission to relieve the battered troops at Hoimy village, Longdien-Datdo district, when the 4th puppet Battalion, 52nd Regiment, 10th Division, stationed at Suoicat was wiped out with 250 men killed.") The Australian higher command also claimed a major triumph, a view later reflected by Graham who believed that the Viet Cong had "got a thrashing". While in total just eight Viet Cong bodies had been recovered from the battlefield, many more had obviously been removed and later Australian intelligence reports assessed Viet Cong losses as between 50 and 70 killed, with many fresh graves later found on the withdrawal route. Indeed as a result of the fighting D445 Battalion was unable to mount a full battalion operation for the remainder of 1967, while their losses were increasingly filled by North Vietnamese. Yet the Australians had also suffered heavy casualties and both sides had matched each other in bravery and determination. The fighting had cost 6 RAR seven killed and 27 wounded, while the cavalry also lost one killed and one wounded, and an APC destroyed. The Viet Cong had proven themselves able to withstand multiple Australian assaults, as well as heavy mortar, artillery, and aerial bombardment, before both sides fell back with their casualties. Although 6 RAR had ultimately prevailed, if only by default, the vicious fighting at Ap My An was probably the closest that the Australian Army came to defeat in a major battle during the war.

=== Assessment ===
By staying and fighting the Viet Cong had surprised the Australians, who expected them to withdraw rapidly to their jungle bases following their attack on Lang Phuoc Hai as they had on previous occasions. This assumption had led the Australians to commit forces in a piecemeal fashion when the situation required a deliberate battalion attack supported by blocking forces, a co-ordinated indirect fire plan, and APCs. Yet such an operation would have required considerable time to plan and execute, and Townsend had been ordered not to become too heavily engaged. Ad hoc and planned in haste, Operation Bribie went badly for the Australians from the start with delays in deploying the reaction force. Expecting only minor contact, Graham had finally sent the battalion out after midday and ordered it to return before nightfall. Yet this restriction had a significant impact on the operation, and limited the time available to commanders at all levels for planning and reconnaissance, thereby preventing a more deliberate approach. Once committed, the Australians realised that they had struck at least a company from D445 Battalion with elements of a heavy weapons company, possibly supported by North Vietnamese reinforcements and at least five machine-guns, one heavy machine-gun and two recoilless rifles. Graham had intended to land 6 RAR behind the Viet Cong in order to cut-off their withdrawal, yet instead they had almost landed directly on top of them. Further misjudgement and circumstance affected the Australian response once the battle began, with the initial reports that the Viet Cong position was a 'camp' proving incorrect, as had the belief that the dense scrub made the area unsuitable for cavalry. Meanwhile, A Company's initial assault had lacked adequate artillery support, while B Company's final assault had been hampered by the requirement for A Company's supporting fire to cut-off early. The resulting friction had then culminated in A Squadron's difficulty linking-up with B Company in the dense vegetation, further delaying their relief.

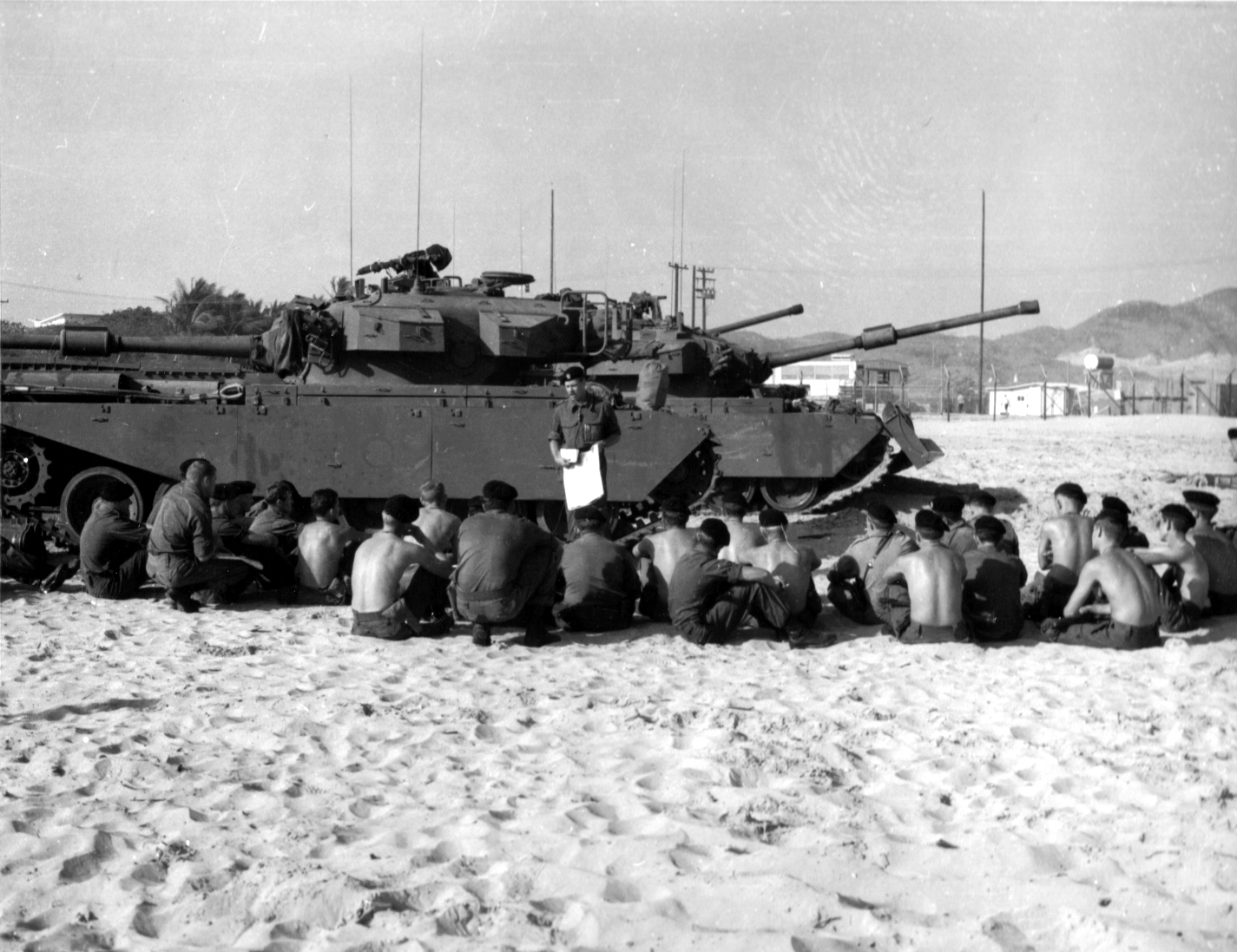
Australian Centurion tanks at Vung Tau in South Vietnam during 1968

The experience held a number of lessons for the Australians; not least of all was the need for tanks. Although the APCs had been used to support the infantry during the operation, they lacked the firepower and armour to be an effective substitute for tanks which would likely have found the terrain and vegetation no obstacle and may have proven decisive. Meanwhile, the futility and waste of frontal tactics and massed bayonet charges against automatic weapons had once again been demonstrated. Yet such lessons still had not been fully grasped by Australian Army training doctrine, and under pressure from Townsend to press on with the attack Mackay had given the order to fix bayonets and charge due to the proximity of his forward platoons to the Viet Cong. Despite having long since ceased to be a decisive weapon of warfare, when ordered the Australians had unhesitatingly charged towards the Viet Cong machine-guns in the certainty of suffering casualties. As a result of their bravery 5 Platoon became one of the most highly decorated Australian platoons of the war. (Note: Two soldiers from 5 Platoon were awarded the Military Medal while three were Mentioned in Despatches, including O'Halloran. Five members of other Australian units were also Mentioned in Despatches, including two soldiers from 6 Platoon, the commander of 2 Platoon, the B Company artillery forward observer and the commander of the 101st Field Battery.) Yet aggression alone could not overcome concentrated firepower, and many survivors were later bitter about the order and losses suffered in these attempts. Another lesson identified included the need to thoroughly prepare an unsecure landing zone by fire prior to insertion. Likewise, during the initial contact A Company had been unable to call in artillery, and the need for a dedicated command and control helicopter to co-ordinate indirect fire during an airmobile assault was also evident.

In attacking Lang Phuoc Hai the Viet Cong had likely intended to draw out and ambush any relief force as it approached the village; a standard tactic they had employed on previous occasions. Indeed, early on 17 February two companies of Viet Cong had established an ambush between Dat Do and Lang Phuoc Hai. That morning the South Vietnamese had subsequently dispatched 189 RF Company from Hoi My, yet the ambush subsequently failed when the RF company commander elected to move by an indirect route to the east of the road, striking the Viet Cong flank just after first light. Although outnumbered, the South Vietnamese had caught the Viet Cong by surprise and were able to fight their way clear, forcing the communists to withdraw to the north-east. Later that day Murphy had taken a similar precaution, moving A Squadron cross-country over the paddy fields to the LZ Amber. Several days after the battle uncorroborated information was received which suggested that in so doing, the Australians may have also avoided a large area ambush on Route 44 between Hoi My and Lang Phuoc Hai by up to two main force battalions, with the convoy perhaps passing within 200 metres (220 yd) of the Viet Cong command group without realising it. Murphy subsequently deduced that the two-company Viet Cong force that had earlier contacted 189 RF Company may have been flank protection or a blocking force for the larger ambush. By inserting into LZ Amber it was probable that 6 RAR had unknowingly also avoided this ambush, yet had subsequently clashed with a large group of Viet Cong resting in the dense jungle adjacent to the landing zone. This force was likely either a reserve or flank security element, and was not a part of the main force that had attacked Lang Phuoc Hai.

During the subsequent fighting at Ap My An the Viet Cong had elected to fight from a hasty but well-prepared position and had displayed good battle discipline, command and control and effective camouflage and concealment. The Australians were later generous in their praise for their performance. In particular their use of snipers had been particularly effective, although overall their individual shooting was of a poor standard and had often been too high. Townsend concluded that the Viet Cong force had most likely been ordered to fight a rearguard action until dark in order to cover the withdrawal a larger force and their command elements. Regardless, despite their strong performance, the battle also held lessons for the Viet Cong themselves. In particular their failure to deploy their machine-guns in the tree line on the edge of the landing zone had allowed the Australians to establish a foothold, despite A Company being forced to assault into an insecure landing zone with only minimal suppression from a single artillery battery. Later during the war the Viet Cong developed the effective tactic of targeting troop helicopters as they arrived at landing zones when they were most vulnerable.

The most intense fighting involving 1 ATF since Long Tan, during Operation Bribie the Australians had suffered their highest casualties since August 1966. In terms of the number of Viet Cong bodies recovered compared to their own losses it was the worst result they had experienced in Vietnam to that point, while the task force had also been unable to destroy D445 Battalion. The results of the fighting continued to be debated long after its conclusion, and while Graham felt that 6 RAR had inflicted severe casualties on the Viet Cong and that the battle later had far reaching effects on the insurgency in Phuoc Tuy province, Vincent believed that any success had only been marginal at best. Certainly to many of the Australian soldiers that fought it, the battle had been no victory. Private Robin Harris of 5 Platoon later wrote: "I think that on this occasion Charlie's losses were overstated. It was us who had copped a hiding." This view was shared by APC commander David Clifton when he recalled: "We had been soundly thrashed on Operation Bribie." Perhaps though, as Mackay later wrote, the "truth of Operation Bribie" was that the Australians and Viet Cong had "thoroughly belted each other". Overall, the Australians had lost the operational strength of a platoon, while the Viet Cong had effectively lost a company; arguably though it was questionable if such attrition would achieve any long-term gains in Phuoc Tuy for the Australians. The battle had a lasting effect on 1 ATF, and ultimately resulted in a number of measures to overcome a perceived weakness in firepower, while also confirming the need to limit the Viet Cong's freedom of movement.

=== Subsequent operations ===
Operation Renmark had been temporarily delayed due to the fighting at Ap My An. Initially it had been planned to begin early on the morning of 18 February, following a pre-planned airstrike on the Long Hais by American B-52 bombers, which had gone ahead as planned at 06:00. However, 5 RAR could not be released until 6 RAR returned to Nui Dat that afternoon, and they finally departed at 15:30. The first Australian search and destroy operation into the Viet Cong base areas of the Minh Dam Secret Zone—located in the Long Hai hills south of Long Dien and Dat Do, 14 kilometres (8.7 mi) from Nui Dat—the operation continued until 22 February. Heavily defended by mines and booby traps, the area had remained a Viet Cong safe haven despite previous operations by the US 173rd Airborne Brigade in June 1966 and two smaller ARVN operations. During the operation B Company 5 RAR suffered seven killed and 22 wounded in a single mine incident, while contact with the Viet Cong was otherwise limited. Once again the Australians had suffered heavy casualties for only modest gain, and coupled with those of Operation Bribie, their losses were beginning to mount.

During February 1967 1 ATF had sustained its heaviest casualties in the war to that point, losing 16 men killed and 55 wounded in a single week. The task force appeared to have lost the initiative and for the first time in nine months of operations the number of Australians killed in battle, or from friendly fire, mines or booby traps, had reversed the task force's kill ratio. Such losses underscored the need for a third battalion and the requirement for tanks to support the infantry; a realisation which challenged the conventional wisdom of Australian counter-revolutionary warfare doctrine which had previously allotted only a minor role to armour. Regardless, it would be nearly a year before additional Australian forces would finally arrive in Vietnam. (Note: With the war continuing to escalate following further American troop increases, 1 ATF was heavily reinforced in late-1967. A third infantry battalion arrived in December 1967, while a squadron of Centurion tanks and additional Iroquois helicopters would also be added in early 1968. In all a further 1,200 men were deployed, taking the total Australian troop strength to over 8,000 men, its highest level during the war. This increase effectively doubled the combat power available to the task force commander.) Although Graham had quickly established himself since taking over as Commander 1 ATF in January, and had developed a sound operational concept, the Viet Cong had succeeded in preventing him from implementing it as he had intended. Operation Bribie confirmed in his mind the need to establish a physical barrier to deny the Viet Cong freedom of movement and thereby regain the initiative, and the subsequent decision to establish an 11-kilometre (6.8 mi) barrier minefield from Dat Do to the coast increasingly came to dominate task force planning. Yet ultimately this would prove both controversial and costly for the Australians, and despite initial success, the minefield would become a source of munitions for the Viet Cong to use against 1 ATF and later the decision would be made to remove it in 1969.

== Notes ==
Footnotes

Citations
