= Stuart Clarence Graham =

Australian general (1920–1996)

- Graham, then a brigadier, while serving as Commander 1 ATF in South Vietnam, 1967.
- Born: 23 October 1920; Ulmarra, New South Wales
- Died: 20 July 1996 (aged 75); Isle of Capri, Queensland
- Military career
- Allegiance: Australia
- Branch: Australian Army
- Service years: 1938–1977
- Rank: Major General
- Commands: 1st Division (1973–74); Northern Command (1972–73); Deputy Chief of the General Staff (1969–72); 1st Australian Task Force (1967); 6th Task Force (1965–66); 1st Armoured Regiment (1952–53); 2nd Battalion, Australian Regiment (1948–49)
- Conflicts: Second World War; Occupation of Japan; Vietnam War
- Awards: Officer of the Order of Australia; Distinguished Service Order; Officer of the Order of the British Empire; Military Cross

Major General Stuart Clarence Graham, AO, DSO, OBE, MC (23 October 1920 – 20 July 1996) was a senior officer in the Australian Army, seeing service during the Second World War, the Occupation of Japan and the Vietnam War. Born in Ulmarra, New South Wales, he graduated from the Royal Military College, Duntroon in 1940. Graham subsequently held a series of regimental and staff appointments, serving in a number of infantry and armoured units during the Second World War. In the post-war period he served in the British Commonwealth Occupation Force in Japan, and held a number of staff and command positions in the Armoured Corps. In the late 1950s he was posted to Army Headquarters, and later served as Director of Military Intelligence. Commanding the 1st Australian Task Force (1 ATF) during fighting in South Vietnam during 1967, he was responsible for establishing the controversial barrier minefield from Dat Do to the coast. Later, Graham filled a range of senior command, staff and diplomatic roles in Australia and overseas, including the position of Deputy Chief of the General Staff (DCGS), before retiring in 1977. He died in 1996.

== Early life ==
Graham was born in Ulmarra, New South Wales, on 23 October 1920, and was educated at Grafton High School. Highly intelligent, he did well at school and achieved a high position in the Leaving Certificate. After joining the Australian Army in January 1938, at the age of 19 he graduated from the Royal Military College, Duntroon (RMC) in August 1940, following the outbreak of the Second World War. He was subsequently allocated to the Armoured Corps as a regular officer in the Permanent Military Force (PMF) with the rank of lieutenant. At Duntroon Graham had excelled academically and was known for his unorthodox and innovative tactical solutions to military problems. Top of his graduating class, he received the Kings Medal for his achievements. Shortly after his commissioning he married Joyce Lawrence of Canberra on 20 August 1940, and the couple later had two sons—Stuart born in 1941, and Ray born in 1944.

== Military career ==
=== Second World War ===
Graham subsequently held a series of regimental and staff appointments, serving in a number of infantry and armoured units. Volunteering for overseas service, he transferred to the Second Australian Imperial Force (2nd AIF) on 26 July 1941. He was subsequently posted to the 2/11th Armoured Car Regiment as the adjutant, followed by attendance at the Staff School. Promoted to captain in September 1942, Graham briefly served on the headquarters of the 1st Armoured Division before being attached to the British Army. Serving with the British 7th Armoured Division, he saw action with them in the North Africa and Italy 1943–44. Coming ashore on the first day of the Allied landing at Salerno, he was wounded but remained on duty. During this period he gained valuable operational experience in armoured warfare; while his service in North Africa may also have shaped his thinking about the use of tactical minefields which had been used extensively during the mobile infantry and armoured battles of 1941–42.

After returning to Australia in February 1944, following a short period in staff positions Graham spent the remainder of the war in the South-West Pacific. Seconded to the infantry, in December 1944 he was given command of a company from the 24th Battalion and went on to distinguish himself during the Bougainville campaign in 1945. During an action on the morning of 17 April C Company, under Graham's command, encountered heavy resistance in thick jungle while attacking strong Japanese positions around Andersons Junction, astride Dawe Creek. Personally leading the attack, he placed a number of anti-tank guns to cover a river crossing and following heavy fighting the Australians finally secured a foothold by late in the afternoon which allowed a bridge to be erected across the creek for the tanks to move forward in support. After repelling a Japanese counter-attack overnight, the following morning Graham led his company forward and succeeded in seizing the high ground after another day of bitter fighting that resulted in heavy Japanese casualties. He was immediately awarded the Military Cross (MC) for his leadership. Graham was later wounded amid heavy fighting in difficult terrain as the Australian advance continued along the Buin Road in May. Promoted temporary major in October 1945, he finished the war posted to the 2/4th Armoured Regiment.

=== Post-war period ===
Following the war, Graham served in various staff positions in Eastern Command based in New South Wales, and in 1946 he was posted to Japan on the Headquarters of the British Commonwealth Occupation Force. Promoted to lieutenant colonel in the Interim Army, he later briefly commanded the 2nd Battalion, Australian Regiment (2 AR) between 23 November 1948 and 10 January 1949. In 1949 Graham was again attached to Headquarters Eastern Command, before subsequently being posted as a tactics instructor to RMC during 1950–51. He later completed further training in the United Kingdom and Germany in 1952. Considered one of Australia's foremost tank experts, Graham commanded the 1st Armoured Regiment during 1952–53. He subsequently served as commandant of the Armoured School between 1953 and 1956, and filled the position of Director of Armour during the same period. He later wrote an influential paper on the successful use of armour in jungle warfare and its ability to reduce casualties among the infantry. Graham attended the United States Armed Forces Staff College and subsequently filled the role of Assistant Military Attaché in Washington, D.C. as an intelligence officer in 1957–58. His exposure to US military culture and intelligence during this period affected his own military thinking and would be influential during his later service. Graham was subsequently posted to Army Headquarters in Canberra in the Directorate of Military Operations and Plans in 1959.

After being promoted to colonel, he served as Director of Military Intelligence between 1960 and 1964, and while the Australian Army was developing its own doctrine on counter-revolutionary warfare, Graham's ideas on counter-insurgency were influenced by a visit to South Vietnam in November 1961. Graham's understanding of the challenges of the prevailing Cold War environment allowed him to reform Australia's nascent military intelligence apparatus, encouraging developments in joint intelligence arrangements with Australia's allies and fostering liaison with his British and US counterparts, as well as establishing relationships with countries in South-East Asia. In recognition of his service to the Australian Staff Corps he was appointed as an Officer of the Order of the British Empire (OBE) in 1963. He then took up an appointment as commandant of the Jungle Training Centre (JTC) at Canungra, Queensland in 1964. The Australian Army Training Team Vietnam (AATTV) was being prepared for deployment during this time, and Army officers were learning new tactics, techniques and procedures. Promoted to brigadier in 1965 he then commanded the 6th Task Force in southern Queensland, supervising the training of 2 RAR and 6 RAR, both battalions which would later serve under his command in Vietnam. In 1966, Graham studied at the Imperial Defence College in London.

=== Vietnam War ===
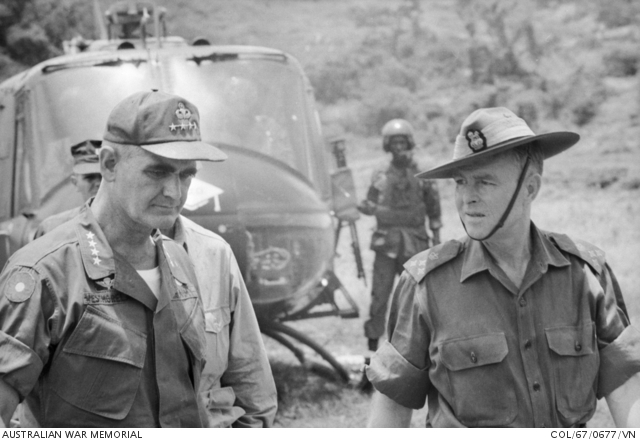
Graham with General William Westmoreland at Nui Dat, August 1967

On 1 January 1967 Graham was appointed Commander 1st Australian Task Force (1 ATF) which was based in Phuoc Tuy Province, South Vietnam, taking over from Brigadier David Jackson. According to Ian McNeill and Ashley Ekins, the official historians of Australian involvement in the Vietnam War, Graham quickly established himself, and developed a sound operational concept, yet the Viet Cong succeeded in preventing him from implementing it as he had intended. With just two battalions 1 ATF's ability to generate combat power was severely limited, while its location at Nui Dat isolated it from the main population centres and increased the burden of self-protection. During February 1967 1 ATF had sustained its heaviest casualties in the war to that point, losing 16 men killed and 55 wounded in a single week, the majority during Operation Bribie after 6 RAR had clashed with two companies from the Viet Cong D445 Battalion reinforced by North Vietnamese regulars, north-west of Hoi My on 17 February. To Graham such losses underscored the need for a third infantry battalion and tanks, yet with the Australian government unable to provide additional military resources at that time, they confirmed in his mind the need to establish a physical barrier to deny the Viet Cong freedom of movement. Graham subsequently established an 11-kilometre (6.8 mi) long barrier minefield from Dat Do to the coast during Operation Leeton (6 March – 1 June) in an attempt to regain the initiative.

While largely forced on Graham by the inadequate forces available and the inherent contradictions of Australian strategic policy, his decision was contrary to the advice of the senior task force engineer, Major Brian Florence. A number of senior infantry officers had also resisted the idea, including one of Graham's battalion commanders, Lieutenant Colonel John Warr, commanding officer 5 RAR, who had served in the Korean War where the Australians had suffered a large number of casualties from mines originally laid by other UN forces. Yet unlike many of his colleagues, as an Armoured Corps officer Graham had not served in Korea, and many of the assumptions he developed about mine warfare in North Africa had remained unchallenged. For the first six months the barrier minefield had resulted in a dramatic decline in Viet Cong infiltration, reducing re-supply movement by up to 80 percent. However, recognising the threat the obstacle posed to them, the Viet Cong had immediately begun attempting to penetrate it, cutting gaps in the fence and clearing lanes through the minefield to restore the flow of supplies, as well as lifting mines for their own use. Conceived to hinder the movement of the Viet Cong between their jungle bases and the villages on which they relied for supplies, the failure of South Vietnamese forces to protect the barrier minefield ultimately allowed the Viet Cong to remove thousands of mines, many of which were subsequently used against 1 ATF. While in keeping with the orthodoxy of Australian counter-insurgency doctrine, Graham's strategy ultimately proved both controversial and costly, and despite initial success, the minefield became a source of munitions for the Viet Cong and later the decision was made to remove it amid growing casualties.

Yet such flaws were not immediately obvious and by the second half of 1967 the Viet Cong in Phuoc Tuy Province seemed to have melted away, abandoning many of their bunker systems and avoiding the main roads and towns. The Battle of Long Tan and Operation Bribie had weakened the communist forces in the province, while further operations had restricted their movement and logistics. This prompted Graham to speculate that the Viet Cong may have fled to the border, perhaps leaving the province altogether. He reasoned that a succession of operations in the south-east of the province and the completion of the barrier minefield at Dat Do meant that no single, sizable threat remained to the populated areas of Phuoc Tuy. Meanwhile, despite allegations of corruption and ballot rigging by the ruling military junta, South Vietnam's presidential elections in September had been unhampered by security concerns and were largely considered successful, with 83 percent of eligible voters turning out nationwide; in Phuoc Tuy this number was higher still at over 90 percent. Graham believed that the large public turnout in Phuoc Tuy had been due to the long-term effects of Australian operations in the province which had increased the population's sense of security. During his tour of duty the task force had conducted 32 operations before he handed over command in October 1967. He was later awarded the Distinguished Service Order (DSO).

=== Senior command ===
After returning to Australia, Graham was subsequently appointed Chief of Staff, Northern Command in December 1967. By 1969 a large percentage of Australian casualties in Vietnam were being caused by mines, including significant quantities of M16 anti-personnel devices removed by the Viet Cong from the barrier minefield at Dat Do. Total Australian casualties from such mines were later estimated as 55 killed and 250 wounded, a figure which constituted approximately 11 percent of those killed during the war. These losses increasingly became a political issue as support for the war in Australia waned, and the efficacy of the decision was later criticised, both within the military and in the media. As the controversy surrounding the minefield grew, in February 1969 Graham was promoted to major general and appointed Deputy Chief of the General Staff (DCGS) and Fifth Military Member of the Military Board, positions he held until 1972. Meanwhile, after visiting Phuoc Tuy Province respected journalist Denis Warner concluded that although the original concept in laying the minefield had been sound, it was ultimately one of the greatest Australian mistakes of the war. By August 1969 work had begun to remove the minefield.

Graham was forced to publicly defend his decision, while questions were raised about the knowledge and approval of his decision as the tactical commander by a number of senior Army officers, including then Commander Australian Forces Vietnam, Major General Tim Vincent, the Chief of General Staff (CGS), Lieutenant General Sir Thomas Daly, and the Chairman of the Chiefs of Staff Committee, General Sir John Wilton, all of whom had acquiesced to its construction. Meanwhile, as DCGS Graham was second only to Daly in the daily running of the Australian Army. During this time Graham unsuccessfully sought the retention of national service following the eventual Australian withdrawal from Vietnam, arguing that it was necessary to further expand the Regular Army. He later managed the draw-down of Australian forces in Vietnam, and played a leading role in shaping the post-war Army. Graham was appointed General Officer Commanding (GOC) Northern Command in 1972 and a year later Commander 1st Division. He subsequently filled the position of head of the Australian Defence Staff in London over the period 1974–76. Graham was made an Officer of the Order of Australia (AO) in the 1975 Birthday Honours. He retired in March 1977.

== Later life ==
In his later life Graham and his wife settled on the Gold Coast in Queensland and were involved in community activities and fundraising. He enjoyed swimming and fishing and was involved in work to help the blind. He died at his home on the Isle of Capri on 20 July 1996 and was survived by his widow and two sons. Despite the debate surrounding the laying of the barrier minefield, McNeill and Ekins later described Graham as a "clever and imaginative" commander, who was "widely regarded as having one of the best minds in the army", and whose "broad knowledge and fair approach earned him the respect of his subordinates." Yet even in death Graham remained a controversial figure. In his book, The Minefield, published in 2007, author and former Army officer Greg Lockhart argued that the decision to establish the minefield had been "reckless"; the product of a failure to understand the prevailing nature of the insurgency in Phuoc Tuy Province, it had ended in "strategic disaster". Lockhart argued that the decision ultimately cost Graham the position of CGS, even though he had been seen by some as being the likely candidate to replace Daly. He went on to describe Graham as ambitious and career-driven, "...a talented man who rose to a position of some importance and was undone by inescapable personal flaws."

== Notes ==
Military offices
Preceded by Major General William Henderson	Commander 1st Division; 1973–1974	Succeeded by Major General Ronald Hughes
