= 274th Regiment (Viet Cong) =

4th Regiment
- Allegiance: Vietnam
- Branch: National Liberation Front (until 1976); People's Army of Vietnam (1976-present)
- Type: Infantry
- Role: Guerrilla (until 1976); Regular infantry (1976-present)
- Size: Regiment
- Part of: 5th Infantry Division (Vietnam)
- Garrison/HQ: Hát Dịch
- Nickname: Đồng Nai

The 4th "Đồng Nai" Regiment (also known as the 274 Viet Cong Main Force Regiment or VC 274th Regiment by the US and its allies) was a regiment of the Viet Cong during the Vietnam War. The regiment was part of the VC 5th Division and operated in the Bien Hoa, Đồng Nai, Phước Tuy and Long Khánh provinces, in what was known as the Hát Dịch Secret Zone.

The Regiment consisted of a headquarters and three battalions (800, 265 and 308 Battalions). Each battalion of the regiment consisted of a HQ, three rifle companies and a heavy weapons company. The regiment consisted of about 1,500 men, recruited from outside the area of their operation supplemented by North Vietnamese Army regulars. Local Viet Cong elements acted as scouts during operations.

The regimental HQ had eight supporting companies equipped with 82 mm mortars, 12.7 mm heavy machine guns and 75 mm recoilless rifles and communications, transport, medical and engineer companies.

The Regiment or its battalions participated in the battles of Suoi Chau Pha, Hat Dich, Long Khanh, Operation Coburg and the Battle of Long Tan against Australian and New Zealand forces, and the Battle of Phuoc Long against the Army of the Republic of Vietnam.

After the Tet Offensive in 1968, the regiment left the 5th Division, stayed and operated in Ba Ria-Long Khanh region, under direct command of Military Region 9.
