= Mây Tào Mountains =

The Mây Tào Mountains are a set of tortoise shaped mountains 45 kilometres north east of Nui Dat and was primarily located in Bình Tuy Province and partly with the Phước Tuy Province and Long Khánh Province. Nui Mây Tào was the topographical junction point for the Long Khánh, Bình Tuy and Phước Tuy provinces.

During the Vietnam War the mountains were used as a headquarters for the Vietcong (VC) 5th Division and 275th Regiment, known as May Tao Secret Zone and Base Area 300, and was a well-developed, heavily dug-in, tunnelled and fortified base area. It had been a VC HQ and logistics base, training area and hospital zone for many years. As part of Operation Marsden between 1–28 December 1969, the 6th Battalion, Royal Australian Regiment and two companies of Royal New Zealand Infantry Regiment assaulted the complex, capturing huge quantities of weapons, equipment, supplies and pharmaceuticals and destroyed the hospital complex. A fire support base (FSB Castle) was established on one of the summits. Four Australians were killed with nine wounded during the operation. VC killed numbered 22 with 5 wounded and 21 prisoners taken, 14 of whom had been patients of the hospital. Approximately 1.5 tonnes of pharmaceuticals were captured, thought to be the largest amount ever seized in the war by allied forces. The discovery and destruction of the hospital would prove to be a major defeat for the VC forces in the area.
