= Nui Dat =

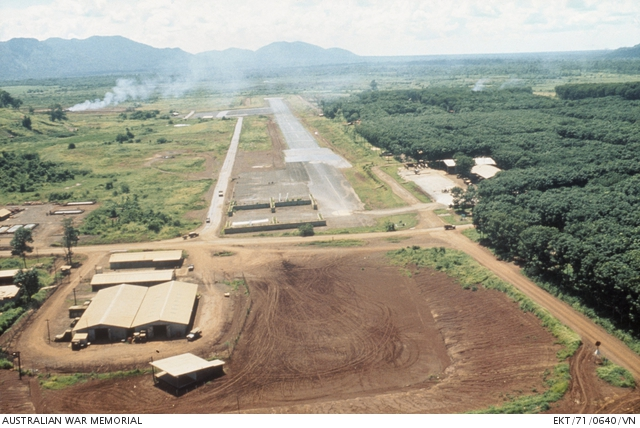
- Luscombe Bowl and airfield, Nui Dat, 1971

Site information
- Condition: Abandoned

Location
- Coordinates: 10°33′25″N 107°13′20″E

Site history
- Built: 1966
- In use: 1966–1972
- Battles/wars: Vietnam War

Garrison information
- Occupants: 1st Australian Task Force

Luscombe Airfield
- IATA: none; ICAO: none

Summary
- Elevation AMSL: 115 ft (35 m)
- Interactive map of Luscombe Airfield

Runways
Direction	Length		Surface
Direction	ft	m	Surface
	2,900	884	asphalt

Nui Dat (Núi Đất) is the former military base of the 1st Australian Task Force (1 ATF) now part of Ba Ria city in Ba Ria–Vung Tau province, Vietnam. It is not the name of an official ward, it just means "land hill" or "soil hill" (núi đất).

== History ==
=== 1966–1972 ===
In 1966, when the area was part of the then Phước Tuy Province it was the location of the 1 ATF military base in South Vietnam during the Vietnam War. The site was chosen by Lieutenant General John Wilton in 1966 and was built mainly by men from the 6th Battalion, Royal Australian Regiment. The occupation of Nui Dat in Operation Hardihood required the removal of all inhabitants from within a 4,000-metre (2.5-mile) radius of the base in order to ensure the security of the facility. Ultimately this policy—which was an unusual step among allied bases in Vietnam—required the resettlement of the villages of Long Hải, with a population of 1000, and Long Phuoc, with a population of 3000. Both villages were subsequently destroyed and the villagers rehomed in brand new and improved villages built by Australian engineers; a task which was complete by July 1966.

From 1966 until 1972 the Australians and New Zealanders of the 1st Australian Task Force operated out of Nui Dat providing security and protection for the villages of Phước Tuy, while attempting to destroy the Communist forces headquartered in the Mây Tào Mountains and other Communist strongholds in the border areas of Phước Tuy Province, Long Khánh Province and Biên Hòa Province. The Australians and New Zealanders performed civic tasks such as building villages, improving infrastructure, and providing medical and other civil services for the locals.

After the withdrawal of Australian forces in December 1972, the base was handed over to the Army of the Republic of Vietnam (ARVN) and "stripped bare".

A controversy has arisen over the so-called "Bamboo Pickers Incident". According to Australian Vietnam veteran Ben Morris, Australian soldiers killed five civilians, including two teenage girls, in October 1967 who they mistakenly thought were Viet Cong. Many of the soldiers involved in the incident have suffered from post-traumatic stress disorder.
