= 106th Field Battery, Royal Australian Artillery =

- Active: 1966–1976; 5 December 2014–Present
- Country: Australia
- Branch: Army
- Type: Artillery
- Nickname(s): Turtles
- Engagements: Vietnam War

The 106th Field Battery was an artillery battery unit of the Royal Australian Artillery. The battery was formed in 1966 and served two tours during the Vietnam War before being disbanded in 1976.

The battery was re-raised as 106th Battery on 5 December 2014 as part of 4th Regiment, Royal Australian Artillery.

== History ==
Formed in December 1966 at Wacol, Queensland as part of the 4th Field Regiment.

The battery left for its first tour of Vietnam between April 1967 and March 1968. The second tour of duty of Vietnam was between February 1970 and January 1971.

Reformed in the mid 70's to conducts gun trials for the replacement of the BL 5.5 inch Medium Gun.

In 2014, 106th Battery was re-raised in 4th Regiment to support 2nd Cavalry Regiment which had relocated from Robertson Barracks in Darwin to Lavarack Barracks in Townsville under Plan Beersheba.
