= Douglas Vincent (Australian Army officer) =

Australian general

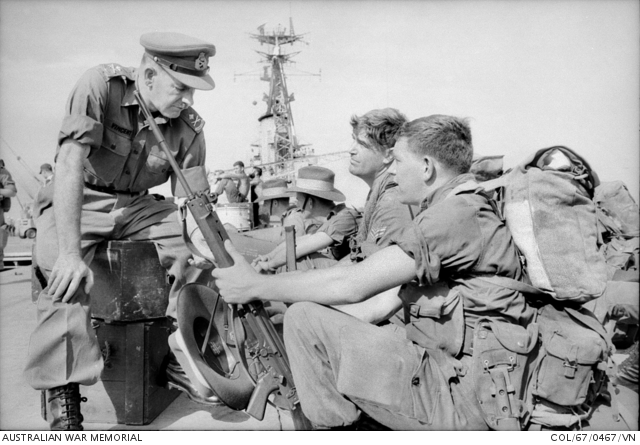
- Vincent speaks to 2RAR troops on HMAS Sydney
- Born: 10 March 1916; Brisbane, Queensland
- Died: 8 October 1995 (aged 79); Canberra, Australian Capital Territory
- Military career
- Allegiance: Australia
- Branch: Australian Army
- Service years: 1935–1973
- Rank: Major General
- Commands: Australian Forces Vietnam (1967–68); 1st Division (1966–67); 1st Task Force (1963–65); Australian Army Force FARLEF (1962–63)
- Conflicts: Second World War; Vietnam War
- Awards: Companion of the Order of the Bath; Member of the Order of Australia; Officer of the Order of the British Empire; Mentioned in Despatches

Major General Douglas (Tim) Vincent, CB, AM, OBE (10 March 1916 – 8 October 1995) was a senior officer in the Australian Army, seeing active service during the Second World War and the Vietnam War. Graduating from the Royal Military College, Duntroon in 1938 into the Signals Corps, he volunteered for service in the Second Australian Imperial Force soon after the outbreak of the Second World War and served in Syria, Western Europe and Borneo. Later, he served as Commander Australian Force Vietnam (COMAFV) during the Vietnam War. After a number of senior staff positions he retired in 1973. He was actively involved in defence issues in his retirement and served as a chairperson of the Returned and Services League of Australia (RSL) prior to his death.

== Early life and education ==
Vincent was born in Brisbane, Queensland, on 10 March 1916, the son of William Vincent. For much of his life he was better known as Tim. Educated at Brisbane State High School, he entered the Royal Military College, Duntroon in 1935 to pursue a career in the Australian Army as a regular officer.

== Military career ==
Vincent graduated as a lieutenant in the Permanent Military Forces (PMF) in December 1938 as the Army began to expand in response to growing tension in Europe and the Pacific, and was allocated to the Royal Australian Corps of Signals. Following the outbreak of the Second World War, he volunteered for service with the Second Australian Imperial Force on 10 May 1940. He subsequently served as adjutant of the 7th Division signals during the Syria–Lebanon Campaign in 1941 against the Vichy French, and later commanded the 25th Brigade signals. On return to Australia he completed a number of staff and instructional postings until early 1944.

In 1944, he was one of 13 Australian Army officers attached to the British Army, which was then preparing for the invasion of Normandy, to gain experience in planning and conducting large-scale amphibious operations. By then a major, Vincent was attached to the headquarters of the British XXX Corps and was involved in planning the landing. Later, after going ashore the day after D-Day, he served with the XXX Corps as well as the 7th Armoured and 43rd (Wessex) Infantry Divisions during the advance across northern France and Belgium. The 43rd Infantry Division was involved in the Battle of Arnhem, during which Vincent commanded the divisional signals regiment. For his service in Western Europe he was later Mentioned in Despatches. In December 1944 he again returned to Australia and was promoted to lieutenant colonel before taking command of the signals unit attached to the I Australian Corps, which was subsequently involved in the amphibious landings on Tarakan, Labuan and Balikpapan against the Japanese during the Borneo Campaign in 1945.

Following the end of the war Vincent held a number of senior appointments in the Signal Corps, including as Director of Signals between 1954 and 1958. As a colonel he was made an Officer of the Order of the British Empire in the Queen's Birthday Honours List on 12 June 1958 in recognition of his service to the Australian Staff Corps. Promoted to brigadier in 1962, he commanded the Australian Army Force in the Far East Land Forces, headquartered in Singapore, during which he gained an understanding of the situation in Vietnam. He commanded the 1st Task Force between 1963 and 1965, and was involved in preparing infantry battalions prior to their deployment to Vietnam. In mid-1966 he was promoted to major general and assumed command of the 1st Division. Vincent took over as Commander, Australian Force Vietnam (COMAFV) in Saigon on 29 January 1967 from Major General Kenneth Mackay, a former classmate at Duntroon, due to the latter's illness. During his period in Vietnam the size of the Australian force in Phuoc Tuy Province grew significantly and he was instrumental in the eventual deployment of Centurion tanks to the theatre, while he also approved the deployment of the 1st Australian Task Force out of the province in late-1967 and its use in helping to disrupt the Viet Cong Tet Offensive in January 1968. Vincent was replaced as COMAFV on 30 January 1968.

During 1968 and 1969 Vincent was posted to Washington, D.C. as head of the Australian Joint Service Staff. He was made a Companion of the Order of the Bath in 1969. Returning to Australia in 1970 he served on the Military Board as Adjutant-General until he retired in 1973.

== Retirement ==
In his later years Vincent remained interested in military issues and was the defence advisor to the Returned and Services League of Australia (RSL) from 1975 to 1993 and the chief commissioner of the RSL Australian Forces Overseas Fund. A qualified military pilot, he took a keen interest in the development of Army Aviation and became honorary colonel of the Australian Army Aviation Corps. In 1994 he was made a Member of the Order of Australia in the Australia Day Honours for his service to the veterans community. He died unexpectedly at his home in Canberra on 8 October 1995, aged 79. He was survived by his wife Margaret and their three children and three grandchildren.

== Notes ==
Military offices
| Preceded by Major General John Andersen | Commander 1st Division; 1966–1967 | Succeeded by Major General Kenneth Mackay |
