= Hát Dịch =

Area within South Vietnam

Coordinates: 10°39′0″N 107°09′00″E

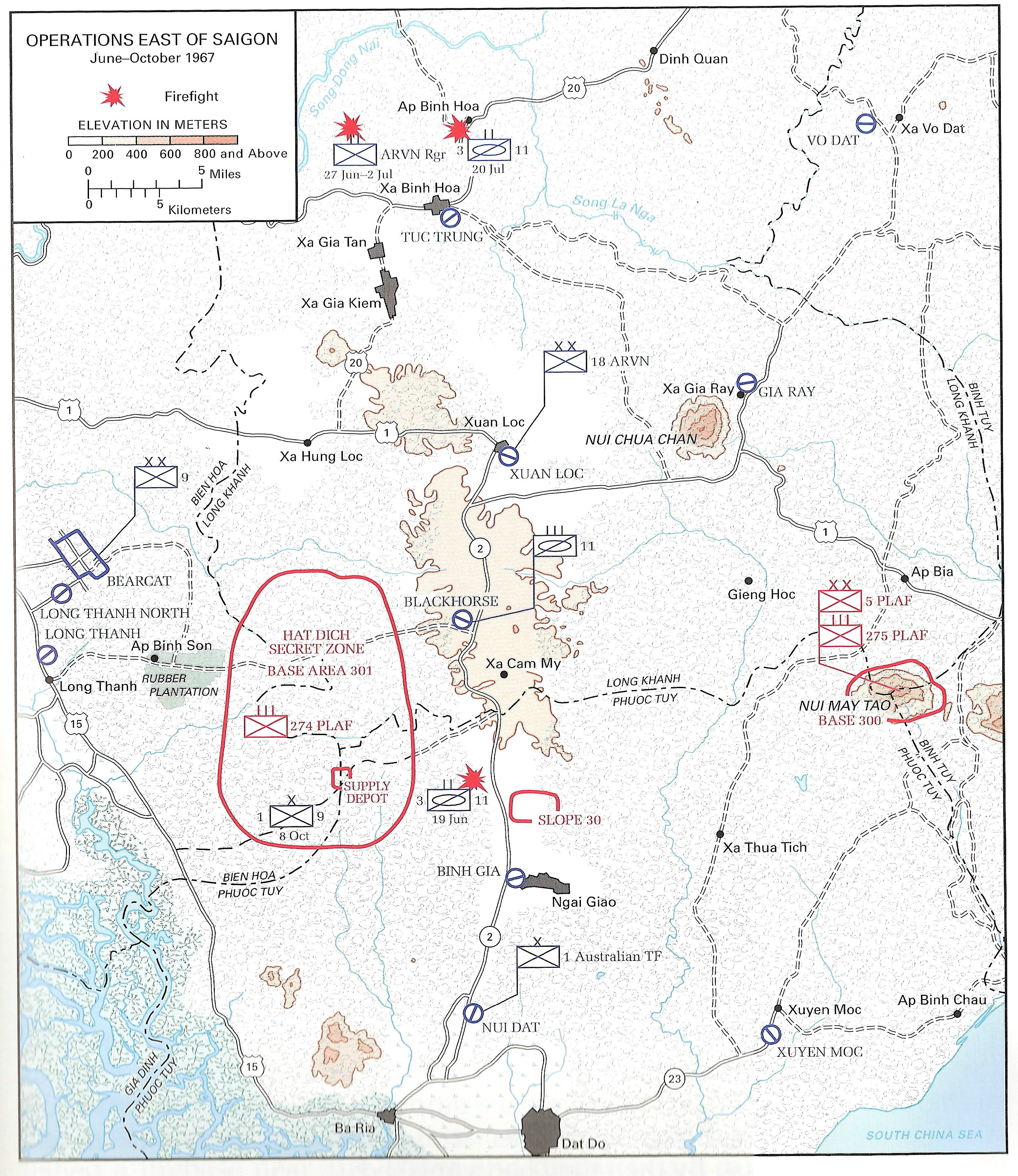
Map showing location of Hat Dich during the Vietnam War

Hát Dịch secret zone (mật khu Hát Dịch, chiến khu Hát Dịch) was an area within South Vietnam. It covered the area where the borders of Phước Tuy, Long Khánh and Biên Hòa Provinces met (today in Đồng Nai and Bà Rịa–Vũng Tàu Provinces).

During the Vietnam War, the area was the headquarters for the Viet Cong (VC) 274th Regiment and was known as the Hat Dich secret zone and Base Area 301. From Hát Dịch, the VC could harass Highway 1, the main supply route between Biên Hòa and Xuân Lộc District and all points further north. They could also interdict Highway 15 to Vũng Tàu, Highway 2 into Phước Tuy Province and Highway 20 to Da Lat.

In the first week of December 1968, the 1st Australian Task Force which consisted of Australian and New Zealand forces launched Operation Goodwood in response to intelligence obtained that suggested a Tet offensive for 1969 was being planned. U.S., Thai, and South Vietnamese forces were put under 1 ATF command to seek out and destroy the Communist forces in the Hat Dich secret zone. After 78 days Operation Goodwood concluded on 19 February. Australian casualties in Goodwood amounted to 21 killed and 91 wounded. South Vietnamese casualties amounted to 31 killed and 81 wounded. One New Zealander was killed with no others wounded. The Americans suffered seven wounded. North Vietnamese and Viet Cong losses amounted to at least 245 killed, 39 possibly killed, 45 wounded and 17 captured, during 274 separate contacts. Nearly 2,000 bunkers were uncovered and many destroyed, while more than 280 rocket propelled grenades, 70 anti-personnel mines, 490 grenades and 450 pounds of explosives were captured overall. Although there were few major actions, the operation was considered a success by 1 ATF Command and the VC were forced to abandon their permanent bases in the Hat Dich as a result.

== See also ==
- Operation Akron
- Battle of Hat Dich
