= 274th Regiment =

274th Regiment may refer to:

- 274th (Northumbrian) Field Regiment, Royal Artillery
- 274th Infantry Regiment (United States)
- 274th Regiment (Viet Cong)
