= Military history of Australia =

The military history of Australia spans the nation's 230-year modern history, from the early Australian frontier wars between Aboriginal people and Europeans to the ongoing conflicts in Iraq and Afghanistan in the early 21st century. Although this history is short when compared to that of many other nations, Australia has been involved in numerous conflicts and wars, and war and military service have been significant influences on Australian society and national identity, including the Anzac spirit. The relationship between war and Australian society has also been shaped by the enduring themes of Australian strategic culture and the unique security challenges it faces.

The six British colonies in Australia participated in some of Britain's wars of the 19th century. In the early 20th century, as a federated dominion and later as an independent nation, Australia fought in the First World War and Second World War, as well as in the wars in Korea, Malaya, Borneo and Vietnam during the Cold War. In the Post-Vietnam era Australian forces have been involved in numerous international peacekeeping missions, through the United Nations and other agencies, including in the Sinai, Persian Gulf, Rwanda, Somalia, East Timor and the Solomon Islands, as well as many overseas humanitarian relief operations, while more recently they have also fought as part of multi-lateral forces in Iraq and Afghanistan. In total, nearly 103,000 Australians died during these conflicts. (Note: This figure represents military casualties only and does not include those that died during the frontier conflict. See Coulthard-Clark 1998, p. v.)

== War and Australian society ==
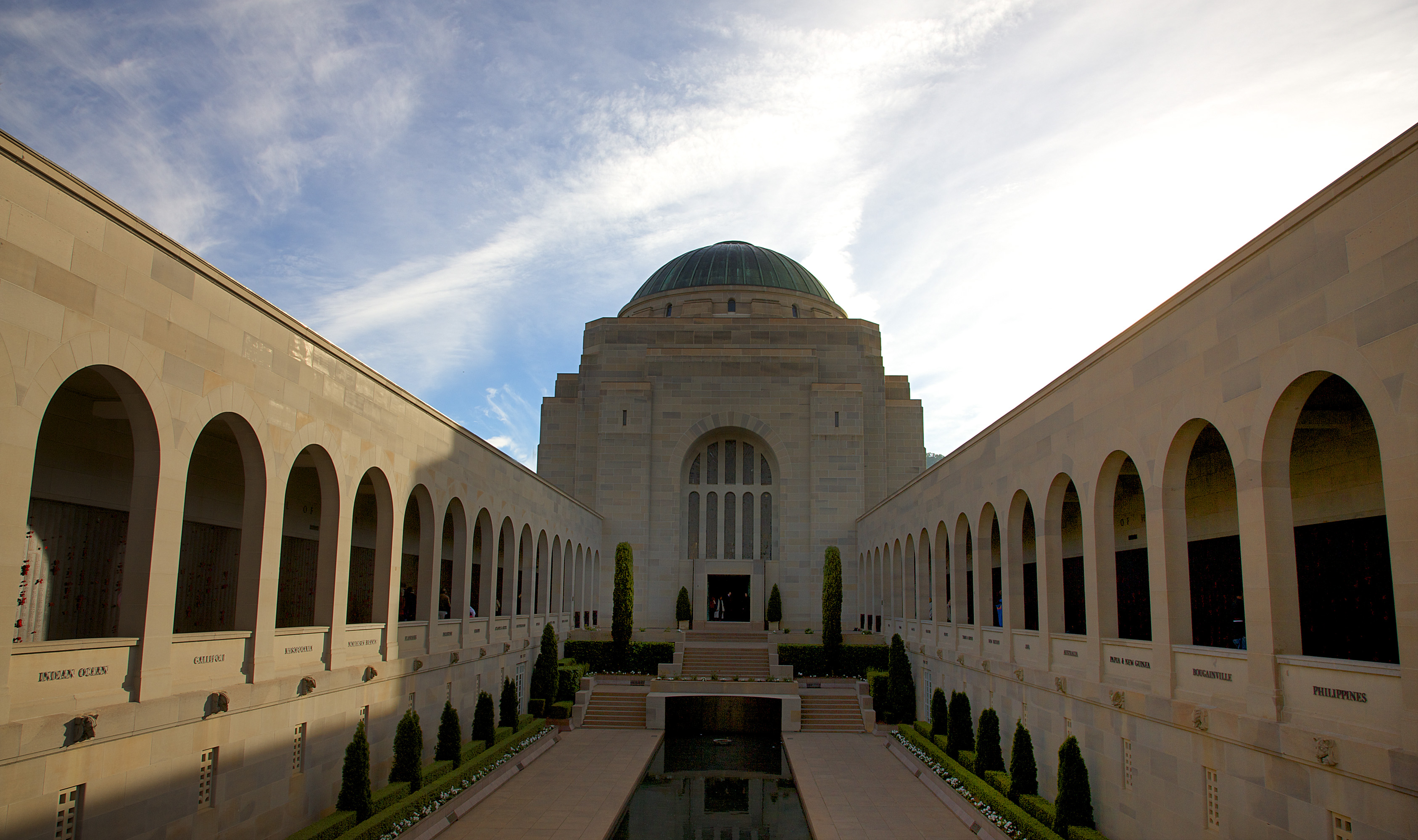
The interior courtyard of the Australian War Memorial in Canberra. Almost 877,000 people visited the Australian War Memorial during 2009–10 and another 204,000 visited its travelling exhibitions.

For most of the 20th century military service has been one of the single greatest shared experiences of white Australian males, and although this is now changing due to the professionalisation of the military and the absence of major wars during the second half of the 20th century, it continues to influence Australian society to this day. War and military service have been defining influences in Australian history, while a major part of the national identity has been built on an idealised conception of the Australian experience of war and of soldiering, known as the Anzac spirit. These ideals include notions of endurance, courage, ingenuity, humour, larrikinism, egalitarianism and mateship; traits which, according to popular thought, defined the behaviour of Australian soldiers fighting at Gallipoli during the First World War. The Gallipoli campaign was one of the first international events that saw Australians taking part as Australians and has been seen as a key event in forging a sense of national identity.

The relationship between war and Australian society has been shaped by two of the more enduring themes of Australian strategic culture: bandwagoning with a powerful ally and expeditionary warfare. Indeed, Australian defence policy was closely linked to Britain until the Japanese crisis of 1942, while since then an alliance with the United States has underwritten its security. Arguably, this pattern of bandwagoning—both for cultural reasons such as shared values and beliefs, as well as for more pragmatic security concerns—has ensured that Australian strategic policy has often been defined by relations with its allies. Regardless, a tendency towards strategic complacency has also been evident, with Australians often reluctant to think about defence issues or to allocate resources until a crisis arises; a trait which has historically resulted in unpreparedness for major military challenges.

Reflecting both the realist and liberal paradigms of international relations and the conception of national interests, a number of other important themes in Australian strategic culture are also obvious. Such themes include: an acceptance of the state as the key actor in international politics, the centrality of notions of Westphalian sovereignty, a belief in the enduring relevance and legitimacy of armed force as a guarantor of security, and the proposition that the status quo in international affairs should only be changed peacefully. Likewise, multilateralism, collective security and defence self-reliance have also been important themes. Change has been more evolutionary than revolutionary and these strategic behaviours have persisted throughout its history, being the product of Australian society's democratic political tradition and Judaeo-Christian Anglo-European heritage, as well its associated values, beliefs and economic, political and religious ideology. These behaviours are also reflective of its unique situation as a largely European island on the edge of the Asia-Pacific, and the geopolitical circumstances of a middle power physically removed from the centres of world power. To be sure, during threats to the core Australia has often found itself defending the periphery and perhaps as a result, it has frequently become involved in foreign wars. Throughout these conflicts Australian soldiers—known colloquially as Diggers—have often been noted, somewhat paradoxically, for both their fighting abilities and their humanitarian qualities.

== History and services ==
=== Colonial era ===
==== British Forces in Australia, 1788–1870 ====
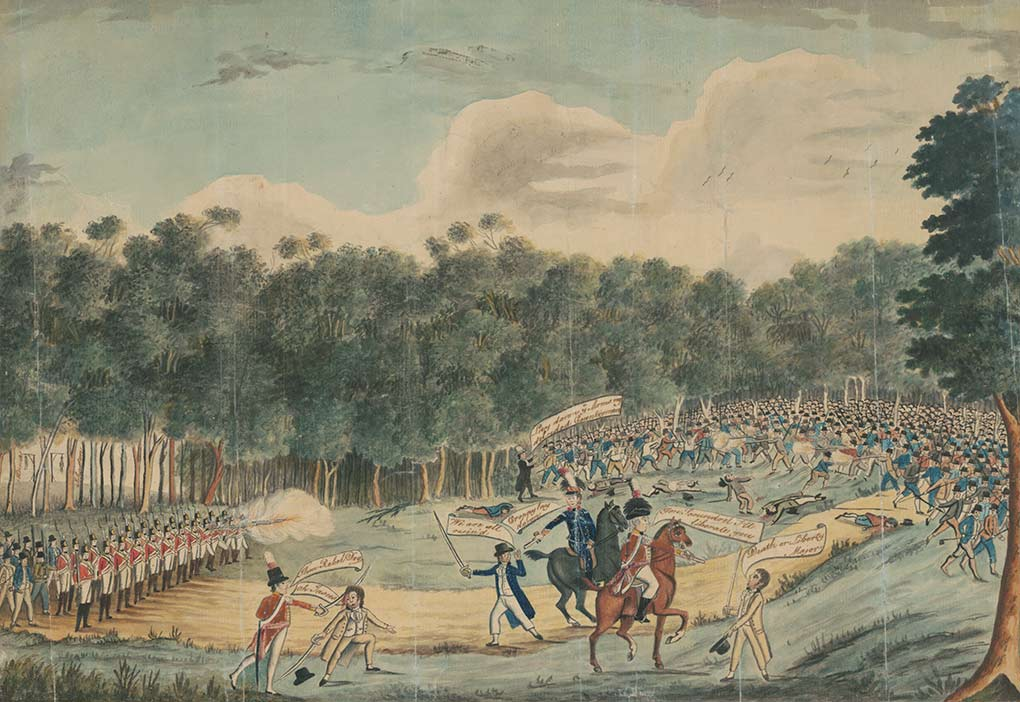
Contemporary watercolour of the 1804 Castle Hill convict rebellion

From 1788 until 1870 the defence of the Australian colonies was mostly provided by British Army regular forces. Originally Marines protected the early settlements at Sydney Cove and Norfolk Island; however, they were relieved of these duties in 1790 by a British Army unit specifically recruited for colonial service, known as the New South Wales Corps. This unit was subsequently involved in putting down a rebellion of Irish convicts at Castle Hill in 1804. Soon however shortcomings in the corps convinced the War Office of the need for a more reliable garrison in New South Wales and Van Diemen's Land. Chief of these shortcomings was the Rum Rebellion, a coup mounted by its officers in 1808. As a result, in January 1810 the 73rd (Perthshire) Regiment of Foot arrived in Australia. By 1870, 25 British infantry regiments had served in Australia, as had a small number of artillery and engineer units.

Although the primary role of the British Army was to protect the colonies against external attack, no actual threat ever materialised. (Note: Although unknown by the British at the time, in 2015 it was reported that recent research had revealed that Spain had planned to invade the fledgling Australian colony in the 1790s with a 100-ship armada. The operation, which was intended to challenge the growth of British influence in the Pacific, would have included an attack on Sydney mounted from Spanish colonies in South America; however, it was subsequently deferred and ultimately abandoned. See Pearlman, Jonathan (26 January 2015). "Spain planned to 'invade' the British colony in Australia in 1790s with 100-vessel armada". The Telegraph. London. ISSN 0307-1235.) The British Army was instead used in policing, guarding convicts at penal institutions, combating bushranging, putting down convict rebellions—as occurred at Bathurst in 1830—and to suppress Aboriginal resistance to the extension of European settlement. Notably British soldiers were involved in the battle at the Eureka Stockade in 1854 on the Victorian goldfields. Members of British regiments stationed in Australia also saw action in India, Afghanistan, New Zealand and the Sudan.

During the early years of settlement the naval defence of Australia was provided by units detached by the Royal Navy's Commander-in-Chief, East Indies, based in Sydney. However, in 1859 Australia was established as a separate squadron under the command of a commodore, marking the first occasion that Royal Navy ships had been permanently stationed in Australia. The Royal Navy remained the primary naval force in Australian waters until 1913, when the Australia Station ceased and responsibility handed over to the Royal Australian Navy; the Royal Navy's depots, dockyards and structures were given to the Australian people.

==== Frontier warfare, 1788–1934 ====
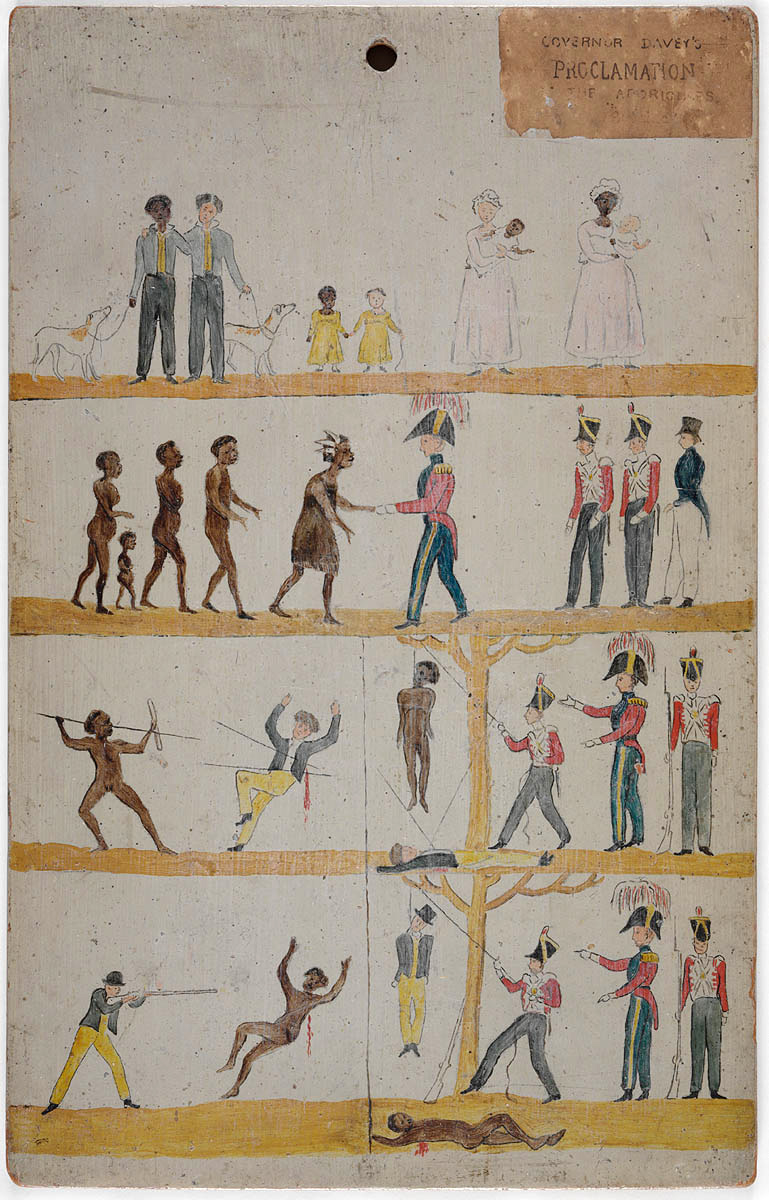
Poster issued in Van Diemen's Land during the Black War implying a policy of friendship and equal justice for white settlers and Indigenous Australians.

The reactions of the native Aboriginal inhabitants to the sudden arrival of British settlers in Australia were varied, but were inevitably hostile when the settlers' presence led to competition over resources, and to the occupation of the indigenous inhabitants' lands. European diseases decimated Aboriginal populations, and the occupation or destruction of lands and food resources sometimes led to starvation. By and large neither the British nor the Aborigines approached the conflict in an organised sense and conflict occurred between groups of settlers and individual tribes rather than systematic warfare. At times, however, the frontier wars did see the involvement of British soldiers and later mounted police units. Not all Aboriginal groups resisted white encroachment on their lands, while many Aborigines served in mounted police units and were involved in attacks on other tribes.

Fighting between Aboriginal people and Europeans was localised as the Aboriginal people did not form confederations capable of sustained resistance. As a result, there was not a single war, but rather a series of violent engagements and massacres across the continent. Organised or disorganised however, a pattern of frontier warfare emerged with Aboriginal resistance beginning in the 18th century and continuing into the early 20th century. This warfare contradicts the popular and at times academic "myth" of peaceful settlement in Australia. Faced with Aboriginal resistance settlers often reacted with violence, resulting in a number of indiscriminate massacres. Among the most famous is the Battle of Pinjarra in Western Australia in 1834. Such incidents were not officially sanctioned however, and after the Myall Creek massacre in New South Wales in 1838 seven Europeans were hanged for their part in the killings. However, in Tasmania the so-called Black War was fought between 1828 and 1832, and aimed at driving most of the island's native inhabitants onto a number of isolated peninsulas. Although it began in failure for the British, it ultimately resulted in considerable casualties amongst the native population.

It may be inaccurate though to depict the conflict as one sided and mainly perpetrated by Europeans on Aboriginal people. Although many more Aboriginal people died than British, this may have had more to do with the technological and logistic advantages enjoyed by the Europeans. Aboriginal tactics varied, but were mainly based on pre-existing hunting and fighting practices—using spears, clubs and other primitive weapons. Unlike the indigenous peoples of New Zealand and North America, on the main Aboriginal people failed to adapt to meet the challenge of the Europeans. Although there were some instances of individuals and groups acquiring and using firearms, this was not widespread. The Aboriginal people were never a serious military threat to European settlers, regardless of how much the settlers may have feared them. On occasions large groups of Aboriginal people attacked the settlers in open terrain and a conventional battle ensued, during which the Aboriginal people would attempt to use superior numbers to their advantage. This could sometimes be effective, with reports of them advancing in crescent formation in an attempt to outflank and surround their opponents, waiting out the first volley of shots and then hurling their spears while the settlers reloaded. However, such open warfare usually proved more costly for the Aboriginal people than the Europeans.

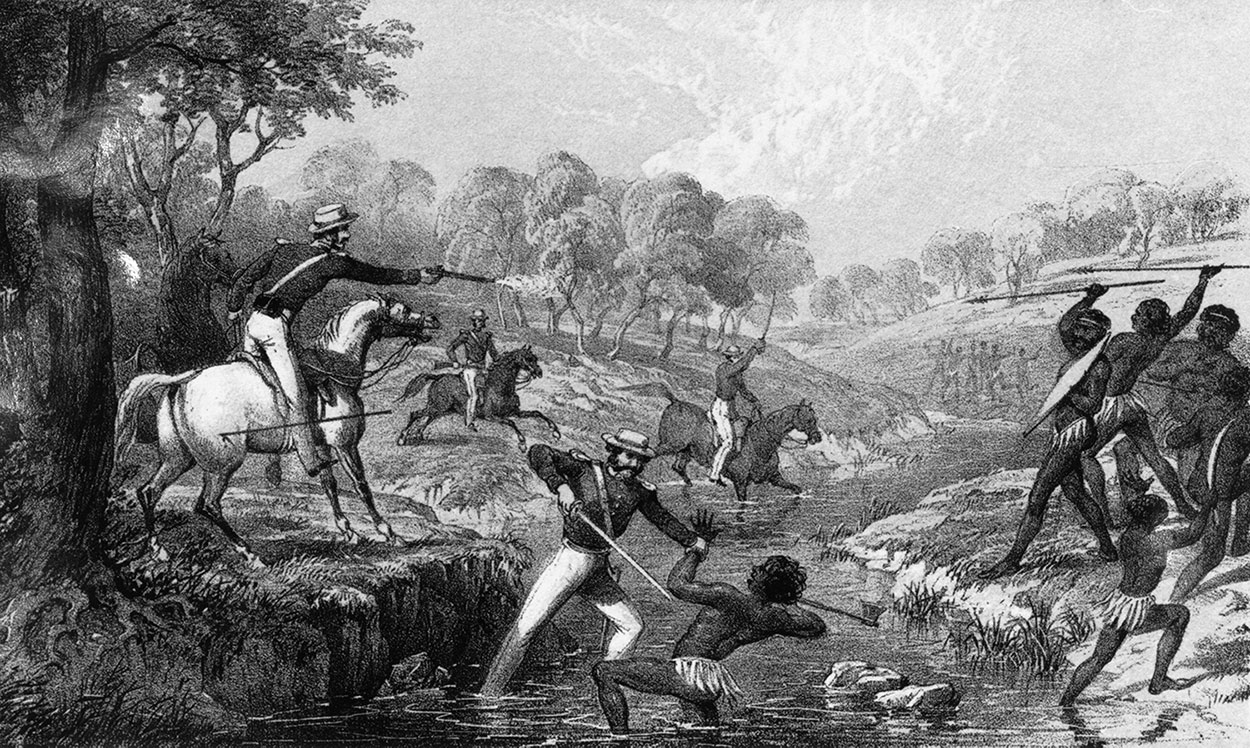
Mounted police engaging Indigenous Australians during the Waterloo Creek massacre of 1838.

Central to the success of the Europeans was the use of firearms. However, the advantages afforded by firearms have often been overstated. Prior to the late 19th century, firearms were often cumbersome muzzle-loading, smooth-bore, single shot muskets with flint-lock mechanisms. Such weapons produced a low rate of fire, while suffering from a high rate of failure and were only accurate within 50 metres (160 ft). These deficiencies may have initially given the Aboriginal people an advantage, allowing them to move in close and engage with spears or clubs. Yet by 1850 significant advances in firearms gave the Europeans a distinct advantage, with the six-shot Colt revolver, the Snider single shot breech-loading rifle and later the Martini-Henry rifle, as well as rapid-fire rifles such as the Winchester rifle, becoming available. These weapons, when used on open ground and combined with the superior mobility provided by horses to surround and engage groups of Aboriginal people, often proved successful. The Europeans also had to adapt their tactics to fight their fast-moving, often hidden enemies. Tactics employed included night-time surprise attacks, and positioning forces to drive the natives off cliffs or force them to retreat into rivers while attacking from both banks.

The conflict lasted for over 150 years and followed the pattern of British settlement in Australia. Beginning in New South Wales with the arrival of the first Europeans in May 1788, it continued in Sydney and its surrounds until the 1820s. As the frontier moved west so did the conflict, pushing into outback New South Wales in the 1840s. In Tasmania, fighting can be traced from 1804 to the 1830s, while in Victoria and the southern parts of South Australia, the majority of the violence occurred during the 1830s and 1840s. The south-west of Western Australia experienced warfare from 1829 to 1850. The war in Queensland began in the area around Brisbane in the 1840s and continued until 1860, moving to central Queensland in the 1850s and 1860s, and then to northern Queensland from the 1860s to 1900. In Western Australia, the violence moved north with European settlement, reaching the Kimberley region by 1880, with violent clashes continuing until the 1920s. In the Northern Territory conflict lasted even later still, especially in central Australia, continuing from the 1880s to the 1930s. One estimate of casualties places European deaths at 2,500, while at least 20,000 Aboriginal people are believed to have perished. Far more devastating though was the effect of disease which significantly reduced the Aboriginal population by the beginning of the 20th century; a fact which may also have limited their ability to resist.

==== New Zealand Wars, 1861–64 ====
===== Taranaki War =====
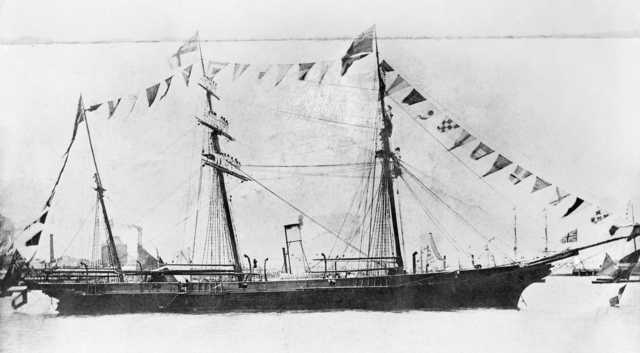
HMCSS Victoria in 1867. In 1861, Victoria was dispatched to assist the New Zealand colonial government during the First Taranaki War.

In 1861, the Victorian ship HMCSS Victoria was dispatched to help the New Zealand colonial government in its war against Māori in Taranaki. Victoria was subsequently used for patrol duties and logistic support, although a number of personnel were involved in actions against Māori fortifications. One sailor died from an accidental gunshot wound during the deployment.

===== Invasion of the Waikato =====
In late 1863, the New Zealand government requested troops to assist in the invasion of the Waikato province against the Māori. Promised settlement on confiscated land, more than 2,500 Australians (over half of whom were from Victoria) were recruited to form four Waikato Regiments. Other Australians became scouts in the Company of Forest Rangers. Despite experiencing arduous conditions the Australians were not heavily involved in battle, and were primarily used for patrolling and garrison duties. Australians were involved in actions at Matarikoriko, Pukekohe East, Titi Hill, Ōrākau and Te Ranga. Fewer than 20 were believed to have been killed in action. The conflict was over by 1864, and the Waikato Regiments disbanded in 1867. However, many of the soldiers who had chosen to claim farmland at the cessation of hostilities had drifted to the towns and cities by the end of the decade, while many others had returned to Australia.

==== Colonial military forces, 1870–1901 ====
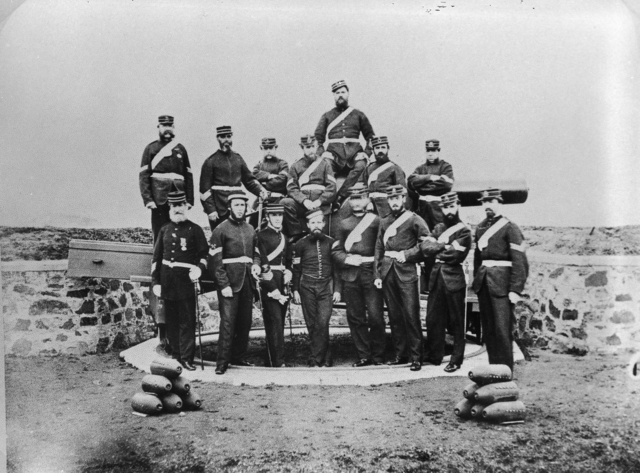
Members of the Hobart Town Volunteer Artillery in August 1869.

From 1870 until 1901, each of the six colonial governments was responsible for their own defence. The colonies had gained responsible government between 1855 and 1890, and while the Colonial Office in London retained control of some affairs, the Governor of the each colony was required to raise their own colonial militia. To do this, they were granted the authority from the British crown to raise military and naval forces. Initially these were militias in support of British regulars, but when military support for the colonies ended in 1870, the colonies assumed their own defence responsibilities. The colonial military forces included unpaid volunteer militia, paid citizen soldiers, and a small permanent component. They were mainly infantry, cavalry and mounted infantry, and were neither housed in barracks nor subject to full military discipline. Even after significant reforms in the 1870s—including the expansion of the permanent forces to include engineer and artillery units—they remained too small and unbalanced to be considered armies in the modern sense. By 1885, the forces numbered 21,000 men. Although they could not be compelled to serve overseas many volunteers subsequently did see action in a number conflicts of the British Empire during the 19th century, with the colonies raising contingents to serve in Sudan, South Africa and China.

Despite a reputation of colonial inferiority, many of the locally raised units were highly organised, disciplined, professional, and well trained. During this period, defences in Australia mainly revolved around static defence by combined infantry and artillery, based on garrisoned coastal forts. However, by the 1890s, improved railway communications between the mainland eastern colonies led Major General James Edwards—who had recently completed a survey of colonial military forces—to the belief that the colonies could be defended by the rapid mobilisation of brigades of infantry. As a consequence he called for a restructure of defences, and defensive agreements to be made between the colonies. Edwards argued for the colonial forces to be federated and for professional units—obliged to serve anywhere in the South Pacific—to replace the volunteer forces. These views found support in the influential New South Wales Commandant, Major General Edward Hutton, however suspicions held by the smaller colonies towards New South Wales and Victoria stifled the proposal. These reforms remaining unresolved however, and defence issues were generally given little attention in the debate on the political federation of the colonies.

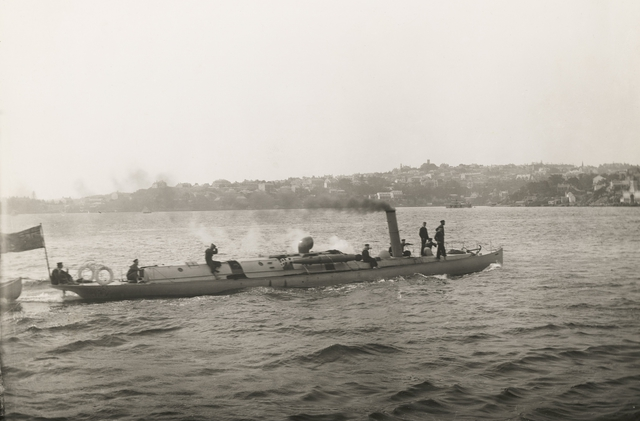
The torpedo boat Avernus of the New South Wales Naval Brigade, c. 1890s.

With the exception of Western Australia, the colonies also operated their own navies. In 1856, Victoria received its own naval vessel, HMCSS Victoria, and its deployment to New Zealand in 1860 during the First Taranaki War marked the first occasion that an Australian warship had been deployed overseas. The colonial navies were expanded greatly in the mid-1880s and consisted of a number of gunboats and torpedo-boats for the defence of harbours and rivers, as well as naval brigades to man vessels and forts. Victoria became the most powerful of all the colonial navies, with the ironclad HMVS Cerberus in service from 1870, as well as the steam-sail warship HMS Nelson on loan from the Royal Navy, three small gunboats and five torpedo-boats. New South Wales formed a Naval Brigade in 1863 and by the start of the 20th century had two small torpedo-boats and a corvette. The Queensland Maritime Defence Force was established in 1885, while South Australia operated a single ship, HMCS Protector. Tasmania had also a small Torpedo Corps, while Western Australia's only naval defences included the Fremantle Naval Artillery. Naval personnel from New South Wales and Victoria took part in the suppression of the Boxer Rebellion in China in 1900, while HMCS Protector was sent by South Australia but saw no action. The separate colonies maintained control over their military and naval forces until Federation in 1901, when they were amalgamated and placed under the control of the new Commonwealth of Australia.

==== Sudan, 1885 ====
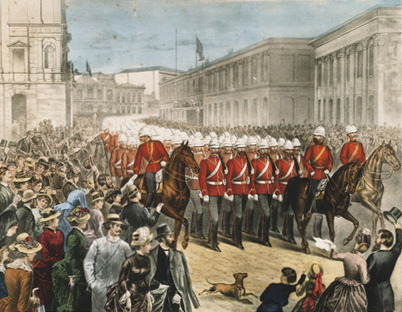
Departure of the New South Wales contingent from Sydney for the Suakin Expedition in Sudan, 1885.

During the early years of the 1880s, an Egyptian regime in the Sudan, backed by the British, came under threat from rebellion under the leadership of native Muhammad Ahmad (or Ahmed), known as Mahdi to his followers. In 1883, as part of the Mahdist War, the Egyptians sent an army to deal with the revolt, but they were defeated and faced a difficult campaign of extracting their forces. The British instructed the Egyptians to abandon the Sudan, and sent General Charles Gordon to co-ordinate the evacuation, but he was killed in January 1885. When news of his death arrived in New South Wales in February 1885, the government offered to send forces and meet the contingent's expenses. The New South Wales Contingent consisted of an infantry battalion of 522 men and 24 officers, and an artillery battery of 212 men and sailed from Sydney on 3 March 1885.

The contingent arrived in Suakin on 29 March and were attached to a brigade that consisted of Scots, Grenadier and Coldstream Guards. They subsequently marched for Tamai in a large "square" formation made up of 10,000 men. Reaching the village, they burned huts and returned to Suakin: three Australians were wounded in minor fighting. Most of the contingent was then sent to work on a railway line that was being laid across the desert towards Berber, on the Nile. The Australians were then assigned to guard duties, but soon a camel corps was raised and 50 men volunteered. They rode on a reconnaissance to Takdul on 6 May and were heavily involved in a skirmish during which more than 100 Arabs were killed or captured. On 15 May, they made one last sortie to bury the dead from the fighting of the previous March. Meanwhile, the artillery were posted at Handoub and drilled for a month, but they soon rejoined the camp at Suakin.

Eventually the British government decided that the campaign in Sudan was not worth the effort required and left a garrison in Suakin. The New South Wales Contingent sailed for home on 17 May, arriving in Sydney on 19 June 1885. Approximately 770 Australians served in Sudan; nine subsequently died of disease during the return journey while three had been wounded during the campaign.

==== Second Boer War, 1899–1902 ====
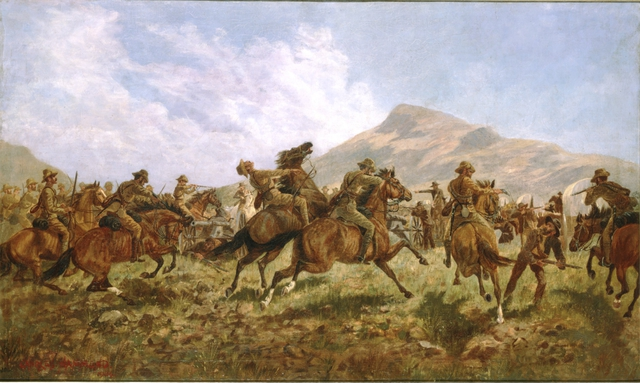
Depiction of Australians and New Zealanders at Klerksdorp, 24 March 1901 by Charles Hammond.

British encroachment into areas of South Africa already settled by the Afrikaner Boers and the competition for resources and land that developed between them as a result, led to the Second Boer War in 1899. Pre-empting the deployment of British forces, the Afrikaner Republics of the Orange Free State and the Transvaal Republic under President Paul Kruger declared war on 11 October 1899, striking deep into the British territories of Natal and the Cape Colony. After the outbreak of war, plans for the dispatch of a combined Australian force were subsequently set aside by the British War Office and each of the six colonial governments sent separate contingents to serve with British formations, with two squadrons each of 125 men from New South Wales and Victoria, and one each from the other colonies. The first troops arrived three weeks later, with the New South Wales Lancers—who had been training in England before the war, hurriedly diverted to South Africa. On 22 November, the Lancers came under fire for the first time near Belmont, and they subsequently forced their attackers to withdraw after inflicting significant casualties on them.

Following a series of minor victories, the British suffered a major setback during Black Week between 10 and 17 December 1899, although no Australian units were involved. The first contingents of infantry from Victoria, South Australia, Western Australia, and Tasmania arrived in Cape Town on 26 November and were designated the Australian Regiment under the command of Colonel John Charles Hoad. With a need for increased mobility, they were soon converted into mounted infantry. Further units from Queensland and New South Wales arrived in December and were soon committed to the front. The first casualties occurred soon after at Sunnyside on 1 January 1900, after 250 Queensland Mounted Infantry and a column of Canadians, British and artillery attacked a Boer laager at Belmont. Troopers David McLeod and Victor Jones were killed when their patrol clashed with the Boer forward sentries. Regardless, the Boers were surprised and during two hours of heavy fighting, more than 50 were killed and another 40 taken prisoner. Five hundred Queenslanders and the New South Wales Lancers subsequently took part in the Siege of Kimberley in February 1900.

Despite serious set-backs at Colenso, Stormberg, Magersfontein, and Spion Kop in January—and with Ladysmith still under siege—the British mounted a five division counter-invasion of the Orange Free State in February. The attacking force included a division of cavalry commanded by Lieutenant General John French with the New South Wales Lancers, Queensland Mounted Infantry and New South Wales Army Medical Corps attached. First, Kimberley was relieved following the battles of Modder River and Magersfontein, and the retreating Boers defeated at Paardeberg, with the New South Wales Mounted Rifles locating the Boer general, Piet Cronjé. The British entered Bloemfontein on 13 March 1900, while Ladysmith was relieved. Disease began to take its toll and scores of men died. Still the advance continued, with the drive to Pretoria in May including more than 3,000 Australians. Johannesburg fell on 30 May, and the Boers withdrew from Pretoria on 3 June. The New South Wales Mounted Rifles and Western Australians saw action again at Diamond Hill on 12 June. Mafeking was relieved on 17 May.

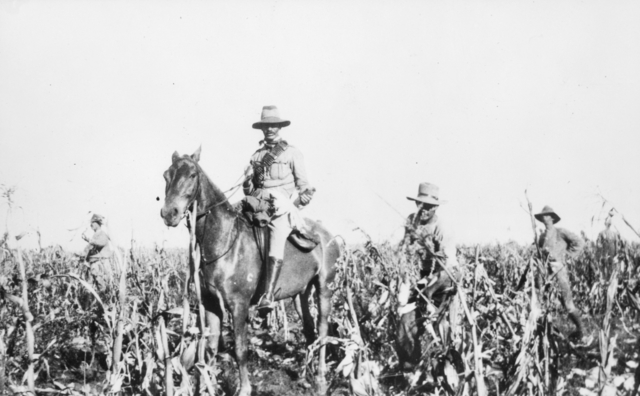
Troops of the 1st Battalion, Australian Commonwealth Horse in the Transvaal, 1902.

Following the defeat of the Afrikaner republics still the Boers held out, forming small commando units and conducting a campaign of guerrilla warfare to disrupt British troop movements and lines of supply. This new phase of resistance led to further recruiting in the Australian colonies and the raising of the Bushmen's Contingents, with these soldiers usually being volunteers with horse-riding and shooting skills, but little military experience. After Federation in 1901, eight Australian Commonwealth Horse battalions of the newly created Australian Army were also sent to South Africa, although they saw little fighting before the war ended. Some Australians later joined local South African irregular units, instead of returning home after discharge. These soldiers were part of the British Army, and were subject to British military discipline. Such units included the Bushveldt Carbineers which gained notoriety as the unit in which Harry "Breaker" Morant and Peter Handcock served in before their court martial and execution for war crimes.

With the guerrillas requiring supplies, Koos de la Rey lead a force of 3,000 Boers against Brakfontein, on the Elands River in Western Transvaal. The post held a large quantity of stores and was defended by 300 Australians and 200 Rhodesians. The attack began on 4 August 1900 with heavy shelling causing 32 casualties. During the night the defenders dug in, enduring shelling and rifle fire. A relief force was stopped by the Boers, while a second column turned back believing that the post had already been relieved. The siege lasted 11 days, during which more than 1,800 shells were fired into the post. After calls to surrender were ignored by the defenders, and not prepared to risk a frontal attack, the Boers eventually retired. The Siege of Elands River was one of the major achievements of the Australians during the war, with the post finally relieved on 16 August.

In response the British adopted counter-insurgency tactics, including a scorched earth policy involving the burning of houses and crops, the establishment of concentration camps for Boer women and children, and a system of blockhouses and field obstacles to limit Boer mobility and to protect railway communications. Such measures required considerable expenditure, and caused much bitterness towards the British, however they soon yielded results. By mid-1901, the bulk of the fighting was over, and British mounted units would ride at night to attack Boer farmhouses or encampments, overwhelming them with superior numbers. Indicative of warfare in last months of 1901, the New South Wales Mounted Rifles travelled 1,814 miles (2,919 km) and were involved in 13 skirmishes, killing 27 Boers, wounding 15, and capturing 196 for the loss of five dead and 19 wounded. Other notable Australian actions included Slingersfontein, Pink Hill, Rhenosterkop and Haartebeestefontein.

Australians were not always successful however, suffering a number of heavy losses late in the war. On 12 June 1901, the 5th Victorian Mounted Rifles lost 19 killed and 42 wounded at Wilmansrust, near Middleburg after poor security allowed a force of 150 Boers to surprise them. On 30 October 1901, Victorians of the Scottish Horse Regiment also suffered heavy casualties at Gun Hill, although 60 Boers were also killed in the engagement. Meanwhile, at Onverwacht on 4 January 1902, the 5th Queensland Imperial Bushmen lost 13 killed and 17 wounded. Ultimately the Boers were defeated, and the war ended on 31 May 1902. In all 16,175 Australians served in South Africa, and perhaps another 10,000 enlisted as individuals in Imperial units; casualties included 251 killed in action, 267 died of disease and 43 missing in action, while a further 735 were wounded. Six Australians were awarded the Victoria Cross.

==== Boxer Rebellion, 1900–01 ====
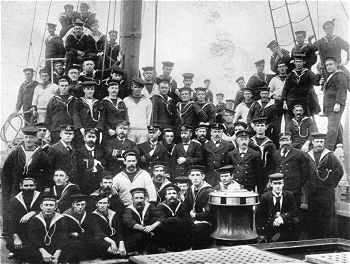
The crew of HMCS Protector in 1900. In the same year, the gunboat was sent to China by the South Australian government.

The Boxer Rebellion in China began in 1900, and a number of western nations—including many European powers, the United States, and Japan—soon sent forces as part of the China Field Force to protect their interests. In June, the British government sought permission from the Australian colonies to dispatch ships from the Australian Squadron to China. The colonies also offered to assist further, but as most of their troops were still engaged in South Africa, they had to rely on naval forces for manpower. The force dispatched was a modest one, with Britain accepting 200 men from Victoria, 260 from New South Wales and the South Australian ship HMCS Protector, under the command of Captain William Creswell. Most of these forces were made up of naval brigade reservists, who had been trained in both ship handling and soldiering to fulfil their coastal defence role. Amongst the naval contingent from New South Wales were 200 naval officers and sailors and 50 permanent soldiers headquartered at Victoria Barracks, Sydney who originally enlisted for the Second Boer War. The soldiers were keen to go to China but refused to be enlisted as sailors, while the New South Wales Naval Brigade objected to having soldiers in their ranks. The Army and Navy compromised and titled the contingent the NSW Marine Light Infantry.

The contingents from New South Wales and Victoria sailed for China on 8 August 1900. Arriving in Tientsin, the Australians provided 300 men to an 8,000-strong multinational force tasked with capturing the Chinese forts at Pei Tang, which dominated a key railway. They arrived too late to take part in the battle, but were involved in the attack on the fortress at Pao-ting Fu, where the Chinese government was believed to have found asylum after Peking was captured by western forces. The Victorians joined a force of 7,500 men on a ten-day march to the fort, once again only to find that it had already surrendered. The Victorians then garrisoned Tientsin and the New South Wales contingent undertook garrison duties in Peking. HMCS Protector was mostly used for survey, transport, and courier duties in the Bohai Sea, before departing in November. The naval brigades remained during the winter, unhappily performing policing and guard duties, as well as working as railwaymen and fire-fighters. They left China in March 1901, having played only a minor role in a few offensives and punitive expeditions and in the restoration of civil order. Six Australians died from sickness and injury, but none were killed as a result of enemy action.

=== Australian military forces at Federation, 1901 ===
The Commonwealth of Australia came into existence on 1 January 1901 as a result of the federation of the Australian colonies. Under the Constitution of Australia, defence responsibility was now vested in the new federal government. The co-ordination of Australia-wide defensive efforts in the face of Imperial German interest in the Pacific Ocean was one of driving forces behind federalism, and the Department of Defence immediately came into being as a result, while the Commonwealth Military Forces (early forerunner of the Australian Army) and Commonwealth Naval Force were also soon established. (Note: The land forces of Australia have held a number of titles during their history. From 1901 to 1916 they were called the Commonwealth Military Forces, after which they were renamed the Australian Military Forces (AMF). In 1980 the AMF was renamed the Australian Army, see "Military Organisation and Structure: One army, two armies?". Australian War Memorial. 5 October 2011.)

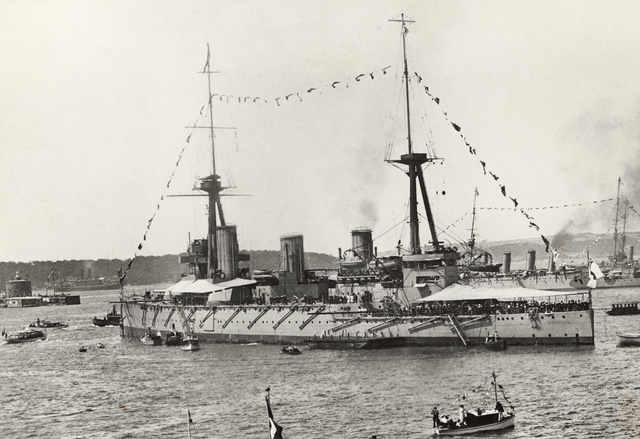
The battlecruiser HMAS Australia enter Sydney Harbour for the first time in 1913. The light cruisers HMAS Sydney and HMAS Melbourne are in the background.

The Australian Commonwealth Military Forces came into being on 1 March 1901 and all the colonial forces—including those still in South Africa—became part of the new force. 28,923 colonial soldiers, including 1,457 professional soldiers, 18,603 paid militia and 8,863 unpaid volunteers, were subsequently transferred. The individual units continued to be administered under the various colonial Acts until the Defence Act 1903 brought all the units under one piece of legislation. This Act also prevented the raising of standing infantry units and specified that militia forces could not be used in industrial disputes or serve outside Australia. However, the majority of soldiers remained in militia units, known as the Citizen Military Forces (CMF). Major General Sir Edward Hutton—a former commander of the New South Wales Military Forces—subsequently became the first commander of the Commonwealth Military Forces on 26 December and set to work devising an integrated structure for the new army. In 1911, following a report by Lord Kitchener the Royal Military College, Duntroon was established, as was a system of universal National Service.

Prior to federation each self-governing colony had operated its own naval force. These navies were small and lacked blue water capabilities, forcing the separate colonies to subsidise the cost of a British naval squadron in their waters for decades. The colonies maintained control over their respective navies until 1 March 1901, when the Commonwealth Naval Force was created. This new force also lacked blue water capable ships, and ultimately did not lead to a change in Australian naval policy. In 1907 Prime Minister Alfred Deakin and Creswell, while attending the Imperial Conference in London, sought the British Government's agreement to end the subsidy system and develop an Australian navy. The Admiralty rejected and resented the challenge, but suggested diplomatically that a small fleet of destroyers and submarines would be sufficient. Deakin was unimpressed, and in 1908 invited the American Great White Fleet to visit Australia. This visit fired public enthusiasm for a modern navy and in part led to the order of two 700-ton River-class destroyers. The surge in German naval construction prompted the Admiralty to change their position however and the Royal Australian Navy was subsequently formed in 1911, absorbing the Commonwealth Naval Force. On 4 October 1913, the new fleet steamed through Sydney Heads, consisting of the battlecruiser HMAS Australia, three light cruisers, and three destroyers, while several other ships were still under construction. And as a consequence the navy entered the First World War as a formidable force.

The Australian Flying Corps (AFC) was established as part of the Commonwealth Military Forces in 1912, prior to the formation of the Australian Military Forces in 1916 and was later separated in 1921 to form the Royal Australian Air Force, making it the second oldest air force in the world. Regardless, the service branches were not linked by a single chain of command however, and each reported to their own minister and had separate administrative arrangements and government departments.

=== First World War, 1914–18 ===
==== Outbreak of hostilities ====
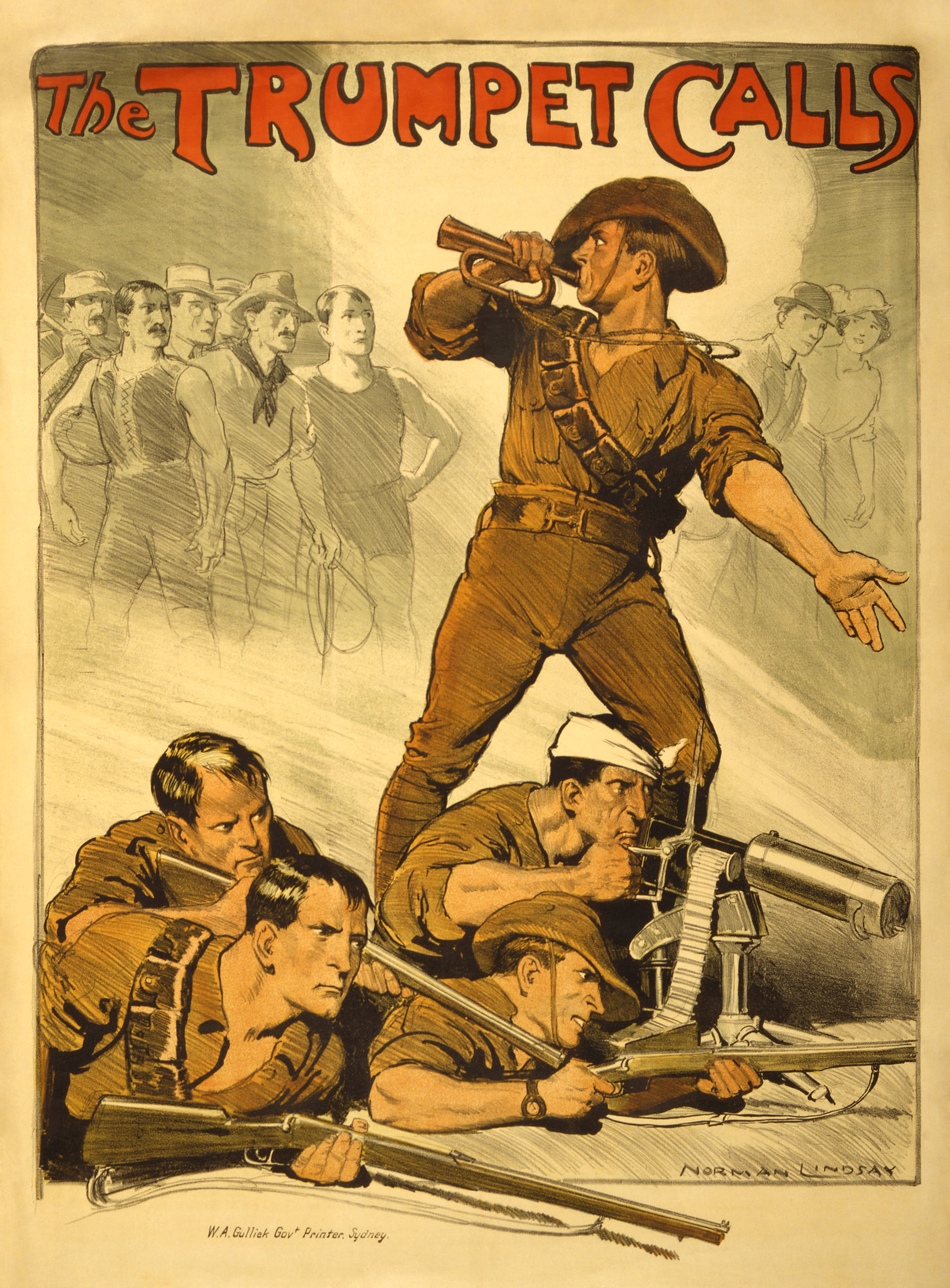
An Australian recruitment poster used during World War I.

When Britain declared war on Germany at the start of the First World War, the Australian government rapidly followed suit, with Prime Minister Joseph Cook declaring on 5 August 1914 that "...when the Empire is at war, so also is Australia" and reflecting the sentiment of many Australians that any declaration of war by Britain automatically included Australia. This was itself in part due to the large number of British-born citizens and first generation Anglo-Australians that made up the Australian population at the time. Indeed, by the end of the war almost 20% of those who served in the Australian forces had been born in Britain.

As the existing militia forces were unable to serve overseas under the provisions of the Defence Act 1903, an all-volunteer expeditionary force known as the Australian Imperial Force (AIF) was formed and recruitment began on 10 August 1914. The government pledged 20,000 men, organised as one infantry division and one light horse brigade plus supporting units. Enlistment and organisation was primarily regionally based and was undertaken under mobilisation plans drawn up in 1912. The first commander was Major General William Bridges, who also assumed command of the 1st Division. Throughout the course of the conflict Australian efforts were predominantly focused upon the ground war, although small air and naval forces were also committed.

==== Occupation of German New Guinea ====
Following the outbreak of war Australian forces moved quickly to reduce the threat to shipping posed by the proximity of Germany's Pacific colonies. The Australian Naval and Military Expeditionary Force (AN&MEF), a 2000-man volunteer force—separate from the AIF—and consisting of an infantry battalion plus 500 naval reservists and ex-sailors, was rapidly formed under the command of William Holmes. The objectives of the force were the wireless stations on Nauru, and those at Yap in the Caroline Islands, and at Rabaul in German New Guinea. The force reached Rabaul on 11 September 1914 and occupied it the next day, encountering only brief resistance from the German and native defenders during fighting at Bita Paka and Toma. German New Guinea surrendered on 17 September 1914. Australian losses were light, including six killed during the fighting, but were compounded by the mysterious loss offshore of the submarine AE1 with all 35 men aboard.

==== Gallipoli ====
The AIF departed by ship in a single convoy from Albany on 1 November 1914. During the journey one of the convoy's naval escorts—HMAS Sydney—engaged and destroyed the German cruiser SMS Emden at the Battle of Cocos on 8 November, in the first ship-to-ship action involving the Royal Australian Navy. Although originally bound for England to undergo further training and then for employment on the Western Front, the Australians were instead sent to British-controlled Egypt to pre-empt any Turkish attack against the strategically important Suez Canal, and with a view to opening another front against the Central Powers. (Note: Despite temporarily being disembarked when the convoy reached the Suez Canal at the end of November in order to assist with the defence of the canal against Turkish forces, it had always been intended that the Australians and New Zealanders would eventually go to the Western Front like the Canadians; however, issues involving the availability of accommodation and equipment in the training areas of the Salisbury Plain made the arrival of further troops during the winter impossible, and they remained in Egypt as a result. See Grey 1999, p. 88.)

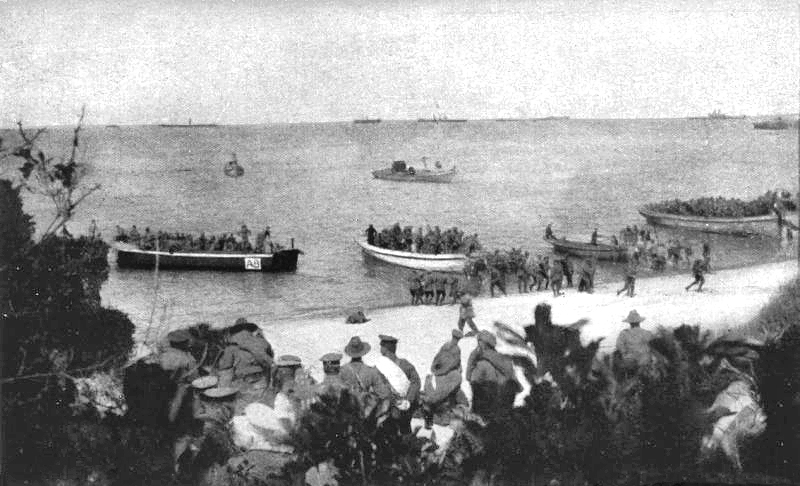
Australian troops landing at Gallipoli, 1915.

Aiming to knock Turkey out of the war the British then decided to stage an amphibious lodgement at Gallipoli and following a period of training and reorganisation the Australians were included amongst the British, Indian and French forces committed to the campaign. The combined Australian and New Zealand Army Corps (ANZAC)—commanded by British general William Birdwood—subsequently landed at Anzac Cove on the Gallipoli peninsula on 25 April 1915. Although promising to transform the war if successful, the Gallipoli Campaign was ill-conceived and ultimately lasted eight months of bloody stalemate, without achieving its objectives. Australian casualties totalled 26,111, including 8,141 killed.

For Australians and New Zealanders, the Gallipoli campaign came to symbolise an important milestone in the emergence of both nations as independent actors on the world stage and the development of a sense of national identity. Today, the date of the initial landings, April 25, is known as Anzac Day in Australia and New Zealand. Every year, thousands of people gather at memorials in both nations, as well as Turkey, to honour the bravery and sacrifice of the original Anzacs, and of all those who have subsequently lost their lives in war.

==== Egypt and Palestine ====
After the withdrawal from Gallipoli the Australians returned to Egypt and the AIF underwent a major expansion. In 1916 the infantry began to move to France while the cavalry units remained in the Middle East to fight the Turks. Australian troops of the Anzac Mounted Division and the Australian Mounted Division saw action in all the major battles of the Sinai and Palestine Campaign, playing a pivotal role in fighting the Turkish troops that were threatening British control of Egypt. The Australians first saw combat during the Senussi uprising in the Libyan Desert and the Nile Valley, during which the combined British forces successfully put down the primitive pro-Turkish Islamic sect with heavy casualties. The Anzac Mounted Division subsequently saw considerable action in the Battle of Romani against the Turkish between 3–5 August 1916, with the Turks eventually pushed back. Following this victory the British forces went on the offensive in the Sinai, although the pace of the advance was governed by the speed by which the railway and water pipeline could be constructed from the Suez Canal. Rafa was captured on 9 January 1917, while the last of the small Turkish garrisons in the Sinai were eliminated in February.

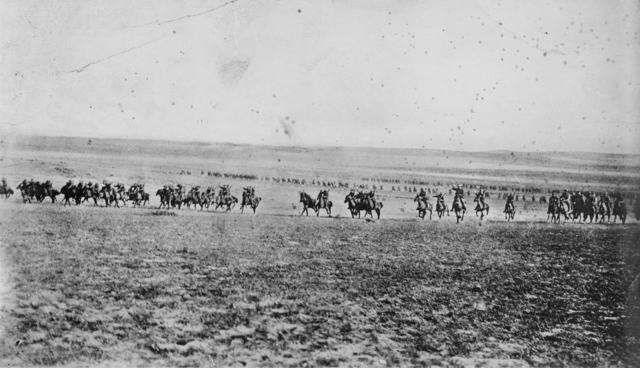
Charge of the 4th Light Horse Brigade, 1917.

The advance entered Palestine and an initial, unsuccessful attempt was made to capture Gaza on 26 March 1917, while a second and equally unsuccessful attempt was launched on 19 April. A third assault occurred between 31 October and 7 November and this time both the Anzac Mounted Division and the Australian Mounted Division took part. The battle was a complete success for the British, over-running the Gaza-Beersheba line and capturing 12,000 Turkish soldiers. The critical moment was the capture of Beersheba on the first day, after the Australian 4th Light Horse Brigade charged more than 4 miles (6.4 km). The Turkish trenches were overrun, with the Australians capturing the wells at Beersheeba and securing the valuable water they contained along with over 700 prisoners for the loss of 31 killed and 36 wounded. Later, Australian troops assisted in pushing the Turkish forces out of Palestine and took part in actions at Mughar Ridge, Jerusalem and the Megiddo. The Turkish government surrendered on 30 October 1918. Units of the Light Horse were subsequently used to help put down a nationalist revolt in Egypt in 1919 and did so with efficiency and brutality, although they suffered a number of fatalities in the process.

Meanwhile, the AFC had undergone remarkable development, and its independence as a separate national force was unique among the Dominions. Deploying just a single aircraft to German New Guinea in 1914, the first operational flight did not occur until 27 May 1915 however, when the Mesopotamian Half Flight was called upon to assist in protecting British oil interests in Iraq. The AFC was soon expanded and four squadrons later saw action in Egypt, Palestine and on the Western Front, where they performed well.

==== Western Front ====
Five infantry divisions of the AIF saw action in France and Belgium, leaving Egypt in March 1916. I Anzac Corps subsequently took up positions in a quiet sector south of Armentières on 7 April 1916 and for the next two and a half years the AIF participated in most of the major battles on the Western Front, earning a formidable reputation. Although spared from the disastrous first day of the Battle of the Somme, within weeks four Australian divisions had been committed. The 5th Division, positioned on the left flank, was the first in action during the Battle of Fromelles on 19 July 1916, suffering 5,533 casualties in a single day. The 1st Division entered the line on 23 July, assaulting Pozieres, and by the time that they were relieved by the 2nd Division on 27 July, they had suffered 5,286 casualties. Mouquet Farm was attacked in August, with casualties totalling 6,300 men. By the time the AIF was withdrawn from the Somme to re-organise, they had suffered 23,000 casualties in just 45 days.

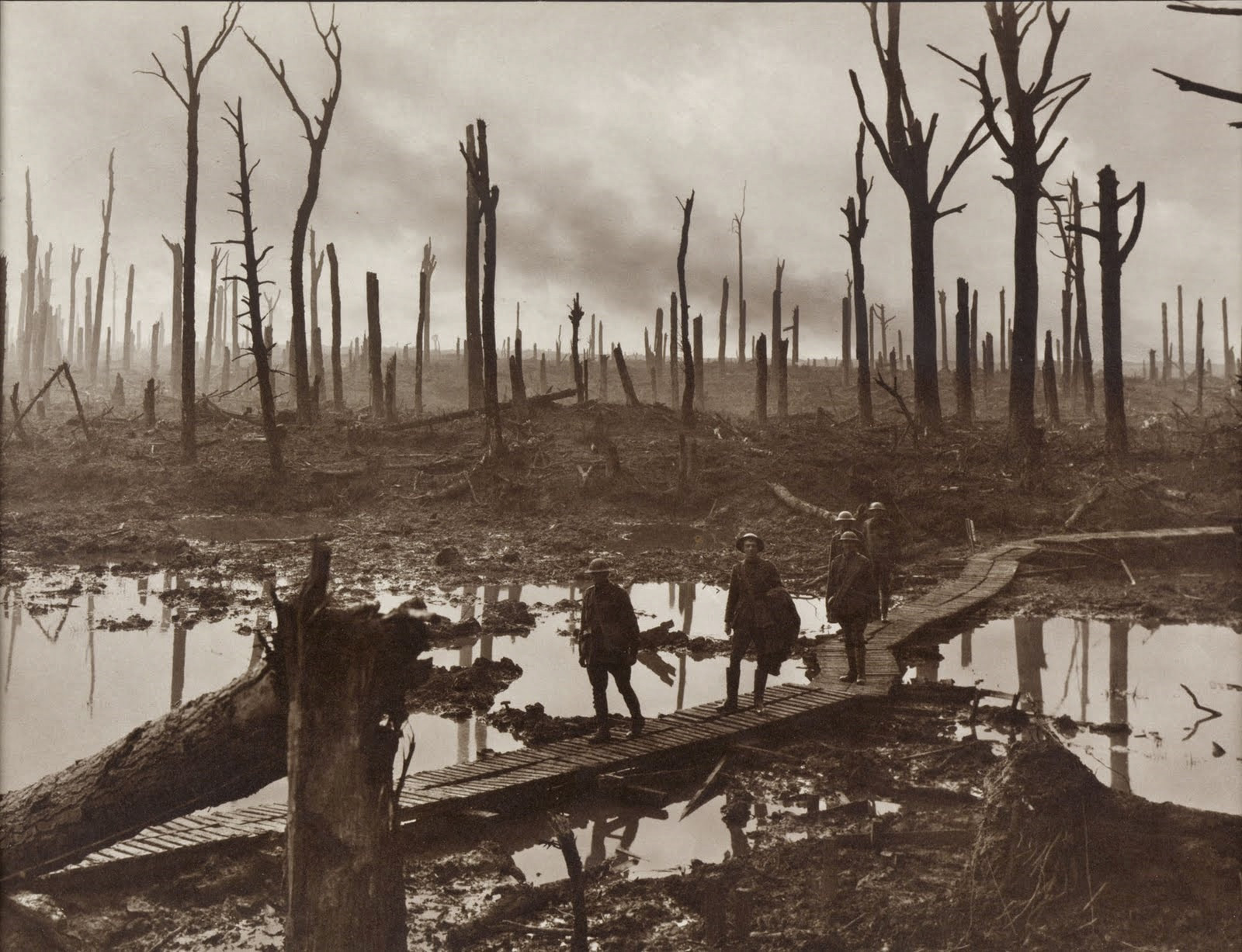
Soldiers of a 4th Division field artillery brigade on a duckboard track passing through Chateau Wood, near Hooge in the Ypres Salient, 1917.

In March 1917, the 2nd and 5th Divisions pursued the Germans back to the Hindenburg Line, capturing the town of Bapaume. On 11 April, the 4th Division assaulted the Hindenburg Line in the disastrous First Battle of Bullecourt, losing over 3,000 casualties and 1,170 captured. On 15 April, the 1st and 2nd Divisions were counter-attacked near Lagnicourt and were forced to abandon the town, before recapturing it again. The 2nd Division then took part in the Second Battle of Bullecourt, beginning on 3 May, and succeeded in taking sections of the Hindenburg Line and holding them until relieved by the 1st Division. Finally, on 7 May the 5th Division relieved the 1st, remaining in the line until the battle ended in mid-May. Combined these efforts cost 7,482 Australian casualties.

On 7 June 1917, the II Anzac Corps—along with two British corps—launched an operation in Flanders to eliminate a salient south of Ypres. The attack commenced with the detonation of a million pounds (454,545 kg) of explosives that had been placed underneath the Messines ridge, destroying the German trenches. The advance was virtually unopposed, and despite strong German counterattacks the next day, it succeeded. Australian casualties during the Battle of Messines included nearly 6,800 men. I Anzac Corps then took part in the Third Battle of Ypres in Belgium as part of the campaign to capture the Gheluvelt Plateau, between September and November 1917. Individual actions took place at Menin Road, Polygon Wood, Broodseinde, Poelcappelle and Passchendaele and over the course of eight weeks fighting the Australians suffered 38,000 casualties.

On 21 March 1918 the German Army launched its Spring Offensive in a last-ditched effort to win the war, unleashing sixty-three divisions over a 70 miles (110 km) front. As the Allies fell back the 3rd and 4th Divisions were rushed south to Amiens on the Somme. The offensive lasted for the next five months and all five AIF divisions in France were engaged in the attempt to stem the tide. By late May the Germans had pushed to within 50 miles (80 km) of Paris. During this time the Australians fought at Dernancourt, Morlancourt, Villers-Bretonneux, Hangard Wood, Hazebrouck, and Hamel. At Hamel the commander of the Australian Corps, Lieutenant General John Monash, successfully used combined arms—including aircraft, artillery and armour—in an attack for the first time.

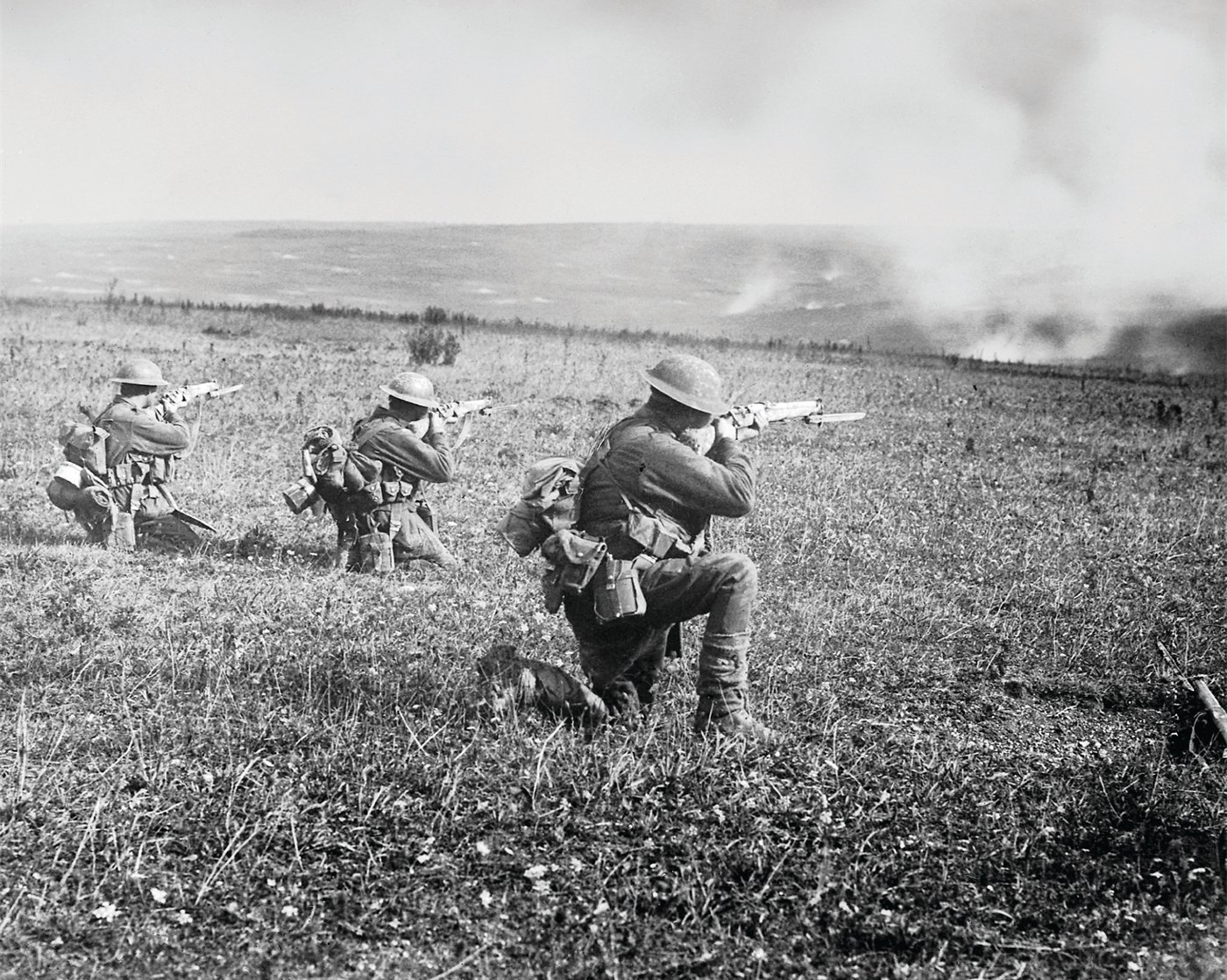
Members of the 45th Battalion at the Battle of St. Quentin Canal in September 1918.

The German offensive ground to a halt in mid-July and a brief lull followed, during which the Australians undertook a series of raids, known as Peaceful Penetrations. The Allies soon launched their own offensive—the Hundred Days Offensive—ultimately ending the war. Beginning on 8 August 1918 the offensive included four Australian divisions striking at Amiens. Using the combined arms techniques developed earlier at Hamel, significant gains were made on what became known as the "Black Day" of the German Army. The offensive continued for four months, and during Second Battle of the Somme the Australian Corps fought actions at Lihons, Etinehem, Proyart, Chuignes, and Mont St Quentin, before their final engagement of the war on 5 October 1918 at Montbrehain. The AIF was subsequently out of the line when the armistice was declared on 11 November 1918.

In all 416,806 Australians enlisted in the AIF during the war and 333,000 served overseas. 61,508 were killed and another 155,000 were wounded (a total casualty rate of 65%). The financial cost to the Australian government was calculated at £376,993,052. Two referendums on conscription for overseas service had been defeated during the war, preserving the volunteer status of the Australian force, but stretching the reserves of manpower available, particularly towards the end of the fighting. Consequently, Australia remained one of only two armies on either side not to resort to conscription during the war. (Note: South Africa was the only other nation not to implement conscription during the war. See Dennis et al 1995, p. 176.)

The war had a profound effect on Australian society in other ways also. Indeed, for many Australians the nation's involvement is seen as a symbol of its emergence as an international actor, while many of the notions of Australian character and nationhood that exist today have their origins in the war. 64 Australians were awarded the Victoria Cross during the First World War.

=== Inter-war years ===
==== Russian Civil War, 1918–19 ====
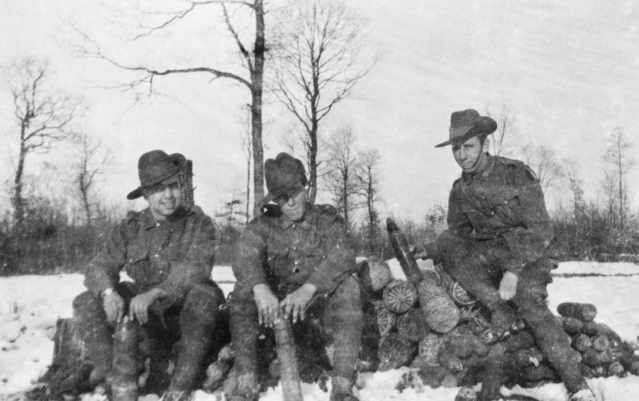
Australian soldiers of the North Russia Relief Force during the Allied intervention in the Russian Civil War, 1919.

The Russian Civil War began after the Russian provisional government collapsed and the Bolshevik party assumed power in October 1917. Following the end of the First World War, the western powers—including Britain—intervened, giving half-hearted support to the pro-tsarist, anti-Bolshevik White Russian forces. Although the Australian government refused to commit forces, many Australians serving with the British Army became involved in the fighting. A small number served as advisors to White Russian units with the North Russian Expeditionary Force (NREF). Awaiting repatriation in England, about 150 Australians subsequently enlisted in the British North Russia Relief Force (NRRF), where they were involved in a number of sharp battles and several were killed.

The Royal Australian Navy destroyer HMAS Swan was also briefly engaged, carrying out an intelligence gathering mission in the Black Sea in late 1918. Other Australians served as advisers with the British Military Mission to the White Russian General, Anton Denikin in South Russia, while several more advised Admiral Alexander Kolchak in Siberia. Later, they also served in Mesopotamia as part of Dunsterforce and the Malleson Mission, although these missions were aimed at preventing Turkish access to the Middle East and India, and did little fighting.

Although the motivations of those Australian's that volunteered to fight in Russia can only be guessed at, it seems unlikely to have been political. Regardless, they confirmed a reputation for audacity and courage, winning the only two Victoria Crosses of the land campaign, despite their small numbers. Yet Australian involvement was barely noticed at home at the time and made little difference to the outcome of the war. Total casualties included 10 killed and 40 wounded, with most deaths being from disease during operations in Mesopotamia.

==== Malaita, 1927 ====
In October 1927, HMAS Adelaide was called to the British Solomon Islands Protectorate as part of a punitive expedition in response to the killing of a district officer and sixteen others by Kwaio natives at Sinalagu on the island of Malaita on 3 October, known as the Malaita massacre. Arriving at Tulagi on 14 October, the ship proceeded to Malaita to protect the landing of three platoons of troops, then remained in the area to provide personnel support for the soldiers as they searched for the killers. The ship's personnel took no part in operations ashore, providing only logistic and communications support. Adelaide returned to Australia on 23 November.

==== Spanish Civil War, 1936–39 ====
A small number of Australian volunteers fought on both sides of the Spanish Civil War, although they predominantly supported the Spanish Republic through the International Brigades. The Australians were subsequently allocated to the battalions of other nationalities, such as the British Battalion and the Lincoln Battalion, rather than forming their own units. Most were radicals motivated by ideological reasons, while a number were Spanish-born migrants who returned to fight in their country of origin. At least 66 Australians volunteered, with only one—Nugent Bull, a conservative Catholic who was later killed serving in the RAF during the Second World War—known to have fought for General Francisco Franco's Nationalist forces.

While a celebrated cause for the Australian left—particularly the Communist Party of Australia and the trade union movement—the war failed to spark particular public interest and the government maintained its neutrality. Australian opposition to the Republican cause was marshalled by B. A. Santamaria on an anti-communist basis, rather than a pro-Nationalist basis. Equally, although individual right wing Australians may have served with the Nationalist rebels, they received no public support. Service in a foreign armed force was illegal at the time, however as the government received no reports of Australians travelling to Spain to enlist, no action was taken. (Note: Such service was technically illegal under the Foreign Enlistment Act 1870—an act of British Parliament. Notably Australia did not possess similar legislation until the Crimes (Foreign Incursions and Recruitment) Act 1978 was passed. See Dennis et al 2008, p. 81.) Consequently, returned veterans were neither recognised by the government or the Returned and Services League of Australia (RSL). Although the number of Australian volunteers was relatively small compared to those from other countries, at least 14 were killed.

=== Second World War, 1939–45 ===
==== Europe and the Middle East ====
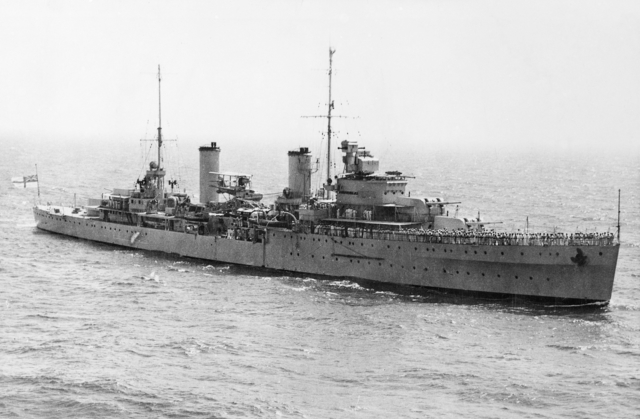
The light cruiser HMAS Sydney in 1940.

Australia entered the Second World War on 3 September 1939. At the time of the declaration of war against Germany the Australian military was small and unready for war. Recruiting for a Second Australian Imperial Force (2nd AIF) began in mid-September. While there was no rush of volunteers like the First World War, a high proportion of Australian men of military age had enlisted by mid-1940. Four infantry divisions were formed during 1939 and 1940, three of which were dispatched to the Middle East. The RAAF's resources were initially mainly devoted to training airmen for service with the Commonwealth air forces through the Empire Air Training Scheme (EATS), through which almost 28,000 Australians were trained during the war.

The Australian military's first major engagements of the war were against Italian forces in the Mediterranean and North Africa. During 1940 the light cruiser HMAS Sydney and five elderly destroyers (dubbed the "Scrap Iron Flotilla" by Nazi Propaganda Minister Joseph Goebbels—a title proudly accepted by the ships) took part in a series of operations as part of the British Mediterranean Fleet, and sank several Italian warships. The Army first saw action in January 1941, when the 6th Division formed part of the Commonwealth forces during Operation Compass. The division assaulted and captured Bardia on 5 January and Tobruk on 22 January, with tens of thousands of Italian troops surrendering at both towns. The 6th Division took part in the pursuit of the Italian Army and captured Benghazi on 4 February. In late February it was withdrawn for service in Greece, and was replaced by the 9th Division.

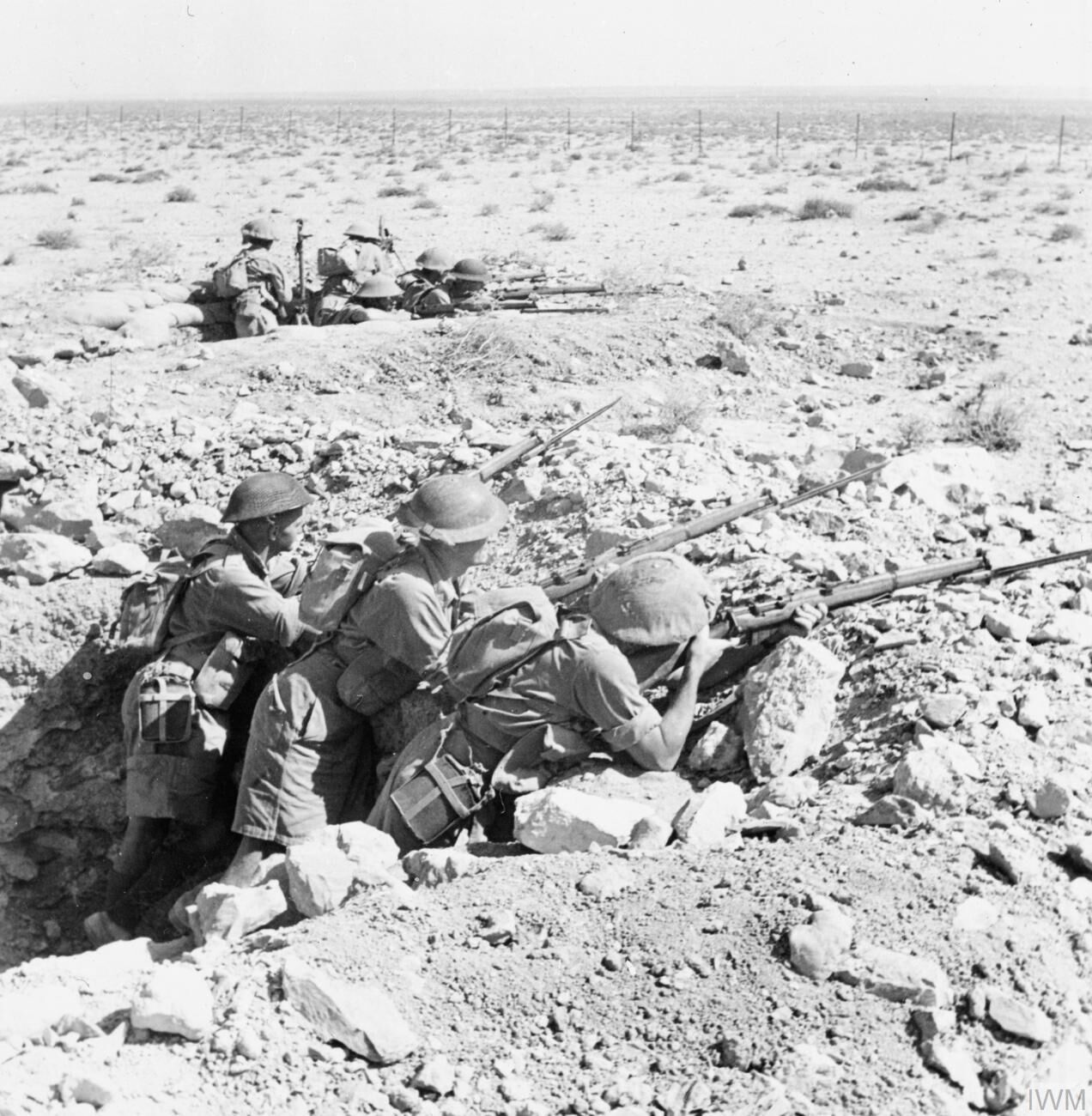
Australian soldiers during the Siege of Tobruk, 1941.

The Australian forces in the Mediterranean endured a number of campaigns during 1941. During April, the 6th Division, other elements of I Corps and several Australian warships formed part of the Allied force which unsuccessfully attempted to defend Greece from German invasion during the Battle of Greece. At the end of this campaign, the 6th Division was evacuated to Egypt and Crete. The force at Crete subsequently fought in the Battle of Crete during May, which also ended in defeat for the Allies. Over 5,000 Australians were captured in these campaigns, and the 6th Division required a long period of rebuilding before it was again ready for combat. The Germans and Italians also went on the offensive in North Africa at the end of March and drove the Commonwealth force there back to near the border with Egypt. The 9th Division and a brigade of the 7th Division were besieged at Tobruk; successfully defending the key port town until they were replaced by British units in October. During June, the main body of the 7th Division, a brigade of the 6th Division and the I Corps headquarters took part in the Syria-Lebanon Campaign against the Vichy French. Resistance was stronger than expected; Australians were involved in most of the fighting and sustained most of the casualties before the French capitulated in early July.

The majority of Australian units in the Mediterranean returned to Australia in early 1942, after the outbreak of the Pacific War. The 9th Division was the largest unit to remain in the Middle East, and played a key role in the First Battle of El Alamein during June and the Second Battle of El Alamein in October. The division returned to Australia in early 1943, but several RAAF squadrons and RAN warships took part in the subsequent Tunisia Campaign and the Italian Campaign from 1943 until the end of the war.

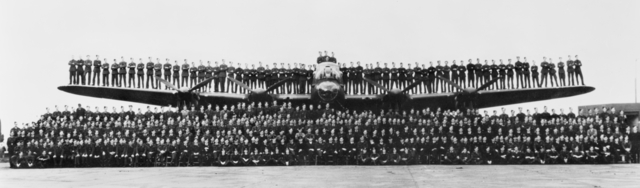
Members of No. 460 Squadron RAAF and the Lancaster bomber G for George in August 1943.

The RAAF's role in the strategic air offensive in Europe formed Australia's main contribution to the defeat of Germany. Approximately 13,000 Australian airmen served in dozens of British and five Australian squadrons in RAF Bomber Command between 1940 and the end of the war. Australians took part in all of Bomber Command's major offensives and suffered heavy losses during raids on German cities and targets in France. Australian aircrew in Bomber Command had one of the highest casualty rates of any part of the Australian military during the Second World War and sustained almost 20 percent of all Australian deaths in combat; 3,486 were killed and hundreds more were taken prisoner. Australian airmen in light bomber and fighter squadrons also participated in the liberation of Western Europe during 1944 and 1945 and two RAAF maritime patrol squadrons served in the Battle of the Atlantic.

==== Asia and the Pacific ====
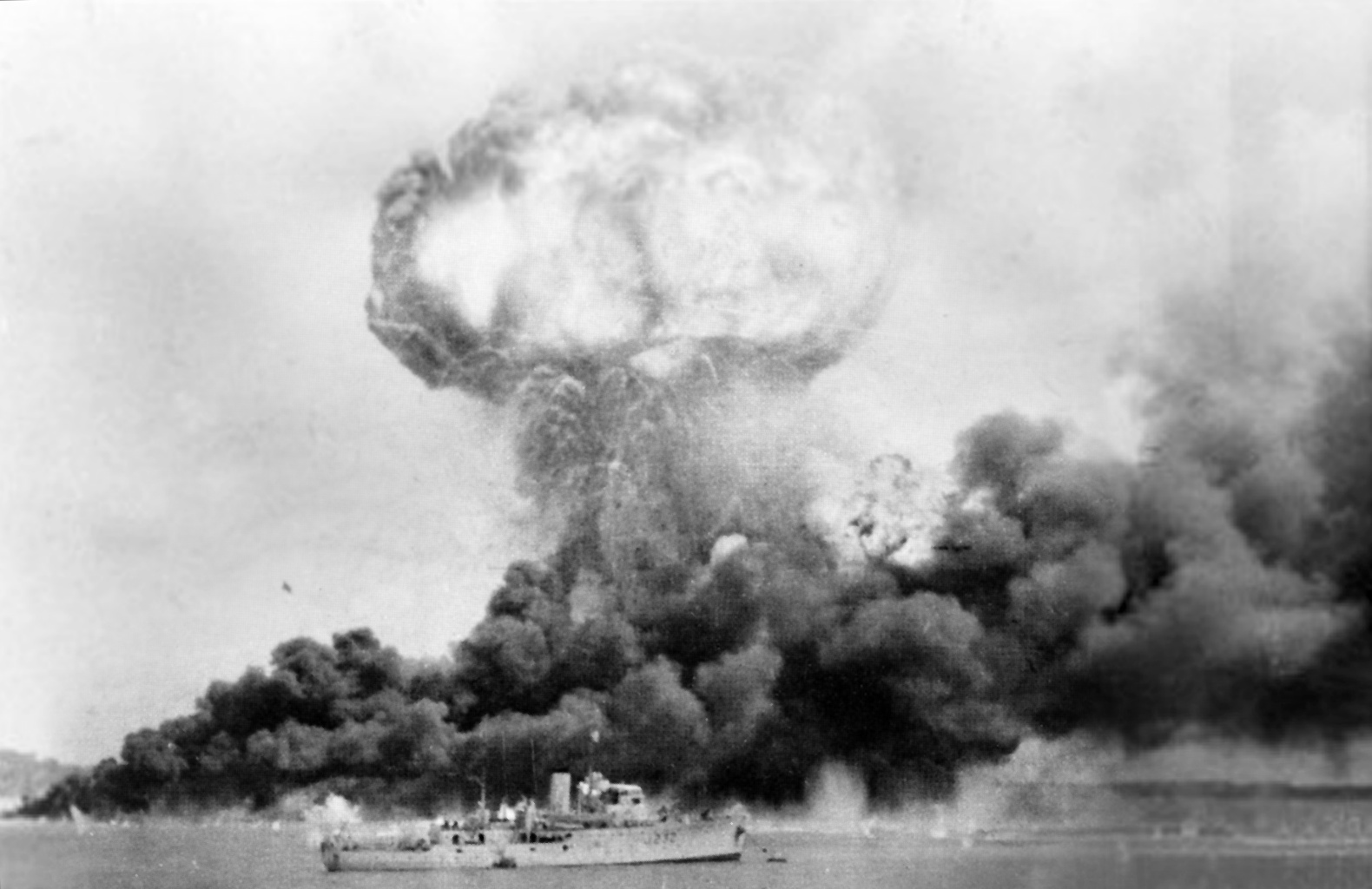
The Bombing of Darwin in 1942 was the largest single attack ever mounted by a foreign power on Australia.

From the 1920s Australia's defence thinking was dominated by British Imperial defence policy, which was embodied by the "Singapore strategy". This strategy involved the construction and defence of a major naval base at Singapore from which a large British fleet would respond to Japanese aggression in the region. To this end, a high proportion of Australian forces in Asia were concentrated in Malaya during 1940 and 1941 as the threat from Japan increased. However, as a result of the emphasis on co-operation with Britain, relatively few Australian military units had been retained in Australia and the Asia-Pacific region. Measures were taken to improve Australia's defences as war with Japan loomed in 1941, but these proved inadequate. In December 1941, the Australian Army in the Pacific comprised the 8th Division, most of which was stationed in Malaya, and eight partially trained and equipped divisions in Australia. The RAAF was equipped with 373 aircraft, most of which were obsolete trainers, and the RAN had three cruisers and two destroyers in Australian waters.

The Australian military suffered a series of defeats during the early months of the Pacific War. The 8th Division and RAAF squadrons in Malaya formed a part of the British Commonwealth forces which were unable to stop a smaller Japanese invasion force which landed on 7 December. The British Commonwealth force withdrew to Singapore at the end of January, but was forced to surrender on 15 February after the Japanese captured much of the island. Smaller Australian forces were also overwhelmed and defeated during early 1942 at Rabaul, and in Ambon, Timor, and Java. The Australian town of Darwin was heavily bombed by the Japanese on 19 February, to prevent it from being used as an Allied base. Over 22,000 Australians were taken prisoner in early 1942 and endured harsh conditions in Japanese captivity. The prisoners were subjected to malnutrition, denied medical treatment and frequently beaten and killed by their guards. As a result, 8,296 Australian prisoners died in captivity.

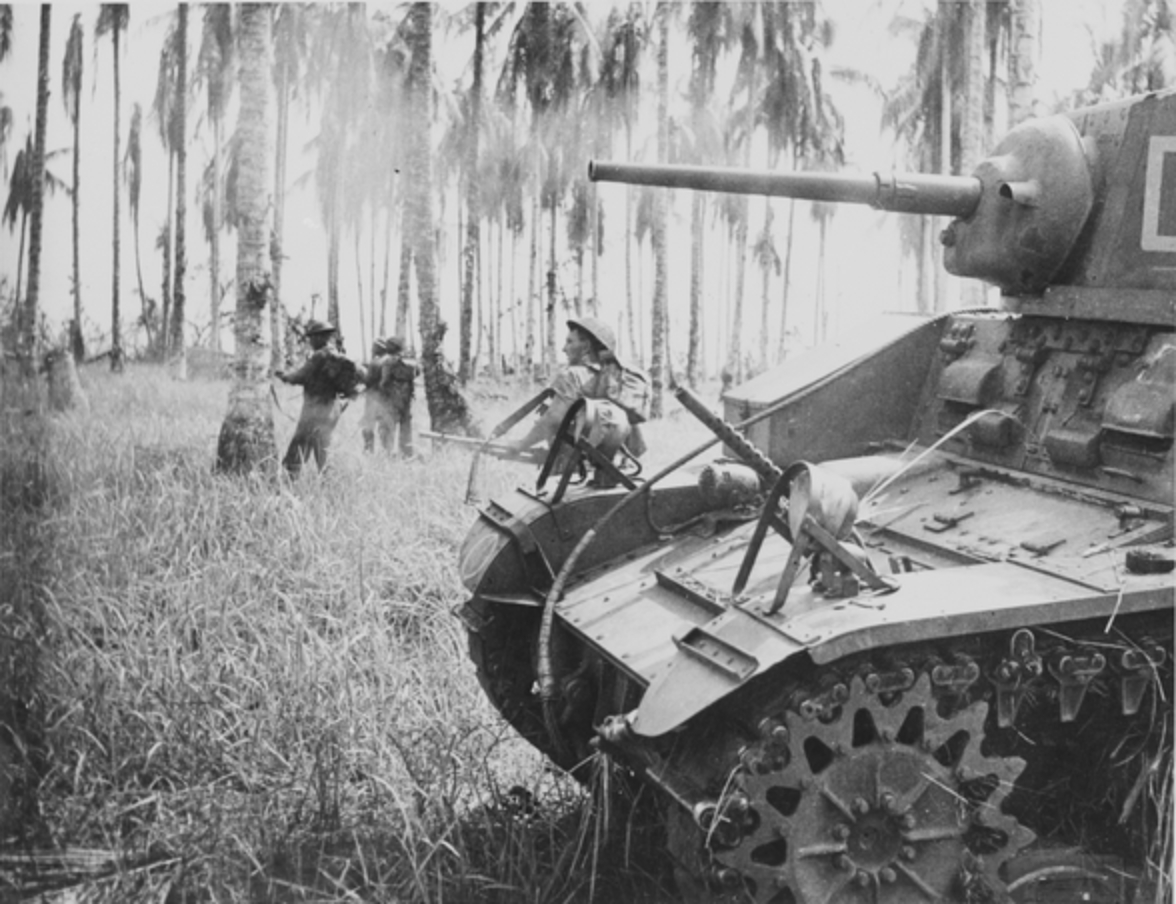
Australian infantry and tanks during the final assault on Buna, 1943.

The rapid Allied defeat in the Pacific caused many Australians to fear that the Japanese would invade the Australian mainland. While elements of the Imperial Japanese Navy proposed this in early 1942, it was judged to be impossible by the Japanese Imperial General Headquarters, which instead adopted a strategy of isolating Australia from the United States by capturing New Guinea, the Solomon Islands, Fiji, Samoa, and New Caledonia. This fact was not known by the Allies at the time, and the Australian military was greatly expanded to meet the threat of invasion. Large numbers of United States Army and Army Air Forces units arrived in Australia in early 1942, and the Australian military was placed under the overall command of General Douglas MacArthur in March.

Australians played a central role in the New Guinea campaign during 1942 and 1943. After an attempt to land troops at Port Moresby was defeated in the Battle of the Coral Sea, the Japanese attempted to capture the strategically important town by advancing overland across the Owen Stanley Ranges and Milne Bay. Australian Army units defeated these offensives in the Kokoda Track campaign and Battle of Milne Bay with the support of the RAAF and USAAF. Australian and US Army units subsequently assaulted and captured the Japanese bases on the north coast of Papua in the hard-fought Battle of Buna-Gona. The Australian Army also defeated a Japanese attempt to capture the town of Wau in January 1943 and went onto the offensive in the Salamaua-Lae campaign in April. In late 1943, the 7th and 9th Divisions played an important role in Operation Cartwheel, when they landed to the east and west of Lae and secured the Huon Peninsula during the Huon Peninsula campaign and Finisterre Range campaign.

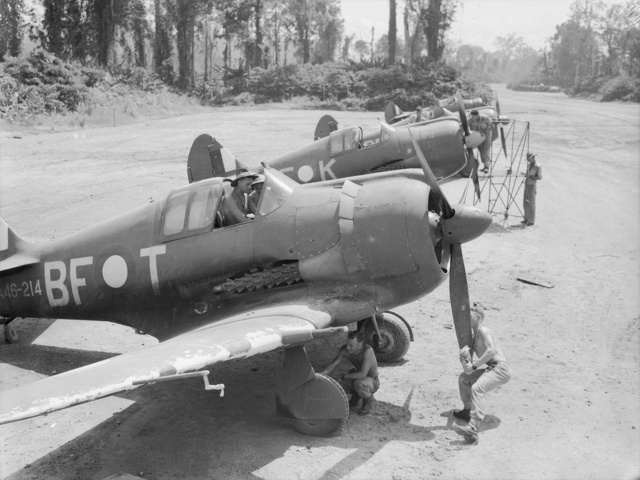
Australian-designed CAC Boomerang aircraft at Bougainville in early 1945.

The Australian mainland came under attack during 1942 and 1943. Japanese submarines operated off Australia from May to August 1942 and January to June 1943. These attacks sought to cut the Allied supply lines between Australia and the US and Australia and New Guinea, but were unsuccessful. On 14 May 1943 the hospital ship AHS Centaur was sunk by a Japanese submarine off Brisbane with the loss of 268 lives. Japanese aircraft also conducted air raids against Allied bases in northern Australia which were being used to mount the North Western Area Campaign against Japanese positions in the Netherlands East Indies (NEI).

Australia's role in the Pacific War declined from 1944. The increasing size of the US forces in the Pacific rendered the Australian military superfluous and labour shortages forced the Government to reduce the size of the armed forces to boost war production. Nevertheless, the Government wanted the Australian military to remain active, and agreed to MacArthur's proposals that it be used in relatively unimportant campaigns. In late 1944, Australian troops and RAAF squadrons replaced US garrisons in eastern New Guinea, New Britain, and Bougainville, and launched offensives aimed at destroying or containing the remaining Japanese forces there. In May 1945, I Corps, the Australian First Tactical Air Force and USAAF and USN units began the Borneo Campaign, which continued until the end of the war. These campaigns contributed little to Japan's defeat and remain controversial.

Following Japan's surrender on 15 August 1945 Australia assumed responsibility for occupying much of Borneo and the eastern Netherlands East Indies until British and Dutch colonial rule was restored. Australian authorities also conducted a number of war crimes trials of Japanese personnel. 993,000 Australians enlisted during the war, while 557,000 served overseas. Casualties included 39,767 killed and another 66,553 were wounded. (Note: 27,073 Australians were killed and 23,477 were wounded by enemy action during the war, however when non-battle casualties are included these figures are 39,767 killed and another 66,553 wounded. See "Australian War Casualties". Australian War Memorial. 15 December 2005.) 20 Victoria Crosses were awarded to Australians.

=== Post-war period ===
==== Demobilisation and peace-time defence arrangements ====
The demobilisation of the Australian military following the end of the Second World War was completed in 1947. Plans for post-war defence arrangements were predicated on maintaining a relatively strong peacetime force. It was envisioned the Royal Australian Navy would maintain a fleet that would include two light fleet carriers, two cruisers, six destroyers, 16 others ships in commission and another 52 in reserve. The Royal Australian Air Force would have a strength of 16 squadrons, including four manned by the Citizen Air Force. Meanwhile, in a significant departure from past Australian defence policy which had previously relied on citizen forces, the Australian Army would include a permanent field force of 19,000 regulars organised into a brigade of three infantry battalions with armoured support, serving alongside a part-time force of 50,000 men in the Citizen Military Forces. The Australian Regular Army was subsequently formed on 30 September 1947, while the CMF was re-raised on 1 July 1948.

==== Occupation of Japan, 1946–52 ====
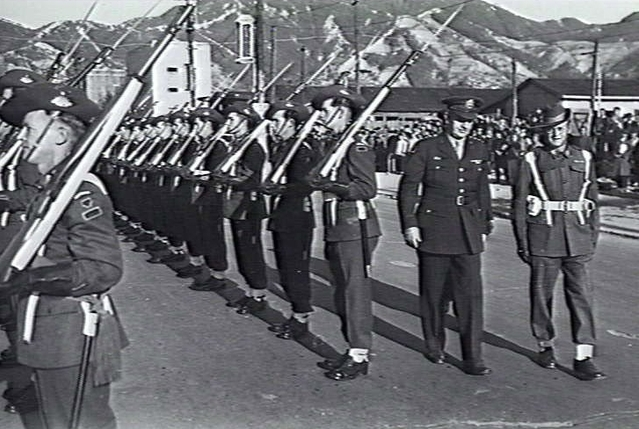
Australian Guard of Honour, at the British Commonwealth Occupation Force headquarters, 1946.

In the immediate post-war period Australia contributed significant forces to the Allied occupation of Japan as part of the British Commonwealth Occupation Force (BCOF), which included forces from Australia, Britain, India and New Zealand. At its height in 1946 the Australian component consisted of an infantry brigade, four warships and three fighter squadrons, totalling 13,500 personnel. The Australian Army component initially consisted of the 34th Brigade which arrived in Japan in February 1946 and was based in Hiroshima Prefecture. The three infantry battalions raised for occupation duties were designated the 1st, 2nd and 3rd battalions of the Royal Australian Regiment in 1949, and the 34th Brigade became the 1st Brigade when it returned to Australia in December 1948, forming the basis of the post-war Regular Army. From that time the Australian Army contribution to the occupation of Japan was reduced to a single under-strength battalion. Australian forces remained until September 1951 when the BCOF ceased operations, although by that time the majority of units had been committed to the fighting on the Korean peninsula following the outbreak of the Korean War in 1950. The RAAF component consisted of Nos. 76, 77 and 82 Squadrons as part of No. 81 Wing RAAF flying P-51 Mustangs, initially based at Bofu from March 1946, before transferring to Iwakuni in 1948. However, by 1950 only No. 77 Squadron remained in Japan. A total of ten RAN warships served in Japan during this period, including HMA Ships Australia, Hobart, Shropshire, Arunta, Bataan, Culgoa, Murchison, Shoalhaven, Quadrant and Quiberon, while HMAS Ships Manoora, Westralia and Kanimbla also provided support.

=== Cold War ===
==== Early planning and commitments ====
During the early years of the Cold War, Australian defence planning assumed that in the event of the outbreak of a global war between the Western world and Eastern bloc countries it would need to contribute forces under collective security arrangements as part of the United Nations, or a coalition led by either the United States or Britain. The Middle East was considered the most likely area of operations for Australian forces, where they were expected to operate with British forces. Early commitments included the involvement of RAAF aircrew during the Berlin Airlift in 1948–49 and the deployment of No. 78 Wing RAAF to Malta in the Mediterranean from 1952 to 1954. Meanwhile, defence preparedness initiatives included the introduction of a National Service Scheme in 1951 to provide manpower for the citizen forces of the Army, RAAF and RAN.

==== Korean War, 1950–53 ====
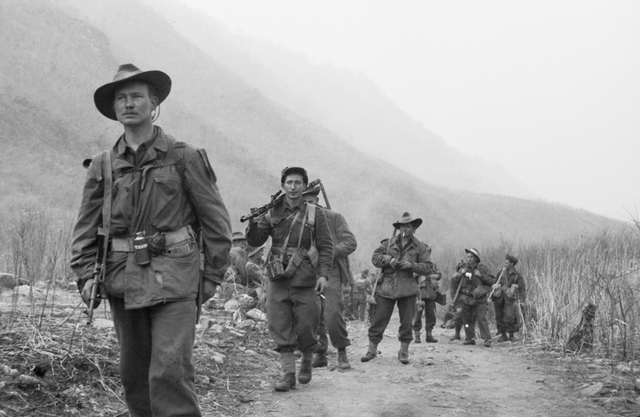
Members of 3rd Battalion, Royal Australian Regiment move forward in 1951.

On 25 June 1950, the North Korean Army (KPA) crossed the border into South Korea and advanced for the capital Seoul, which fell in less than a week. North Korean forces continued toward the port of Pusan and two days later the United States offered its assistance to South Korea. In response the United Nations Security Council requested members to assist in repelling the North Korean attack. Australia initially contributed P-51 Mustang fighter-bomber aircraft from No. 77 Squadron RAAF and infantry from the 3rd Battalion, Royal Australian Regiment (3 RAR), both of which were stationed in Japan as part of the BCOF. In addition, it provided the majority of supply and support personnel to the British Commonwealth Forces Korea. The RAN frigate HMAS Shoalhaven, and the destroyer HMAS Bataan, were also committed. Later, an aircraft carrier strike group aboard HMAS Sydney was added to the force.

By the time 3 RAR arrived in Pusan on 28 September, the North Koreans were in retreat following the Inchon landings. As a part of the invasion force under the UN Supreme Commander, General Douglas MacArthur, the battalion moved north and was involved in its first major action at Battle of Yongju near Pyongyang on 22 October, before advancing towards the Yalu River. Further successful actions followed at Kujin on 25–26 October 1950 and at Chongju on 29 October 1950. North Korean casualties were heavy, while Australian losses included their commanding officer, Lieutenant Colonel Charles Green, who was wounded in the stomach by artillery fire after the battle and succumbed to his wounds and died two days later on 1 November. Meanwhile, during the last weeks of October the Chinese had moved 18 divisions of the People's Volunteer Army across the Yalu River to reinforce the remnants of the KPA. Undetected by US and South Korean intelligence, the 13th Army Group crossed the border on 16 October and penetrated up to 100 kilometres (62 mi) into North Korea, and were reinforced in early November by 12 divisions from the 9th Army Group; in total 30 divisions composed of 380,000 men. 3 RAR fought its first action against the Chinese at Pakchon on 5 November. The fighting cost the battalion heavily and despite halting a Chinese division the new battalion commander was dismissed in the wake. Following the Chinese intervention, the UN forces were defeated in successive battles and 3 RAR was forced to withdraw to the 38th parallel.

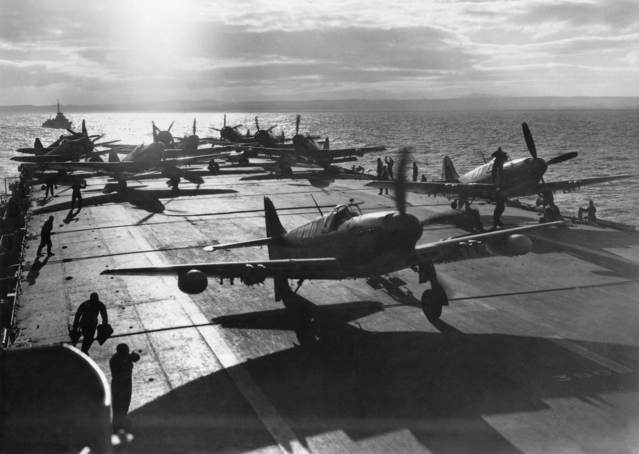
Firefly aircraft on board HMAS Sydney off Korea.

A series of battles followed at Uijeongbu on 1–4 January 1951, as the British and Australians occupied defensive positions in an attempt to secure the northern approaches to the South Korean capital. Further fighting occurred at Chuam-ni on 14–17 February 1951 following another Chinese advance, and later at Maehwa-San between 7–12 March 1951 as the UN resumed the offensive. Australian troops subsequently participated in two more major battles in 1951, with the first taking place during fighting which later became known as the Battle of Kapyong. On 22 April, Chinese forces attacked the Kapyong valley and forced the South Korean defenders to withdraw. Australian and Canadian troops were ordered to halt this Chinese advance. After a night of fighting the Australians recaptured their positions, at the cost of 32 men killed and 59 wounded. In July 1951, the Australian battalion became part of the combined Canadian, British, Australian, New Zealand, and Indian 1st Commonwealth Division. The second major battle took place during Operation Commando and occurred after the Chinese attacked a salient in a bend of the Imjin River. The 1st Commonwealth Division counter-attacked on 3 October, capturing a number of objectives including Hill 355 and Hill 317 during the Battle of Maryang San; after five days the Chinese retreated. Australian casualties included 20 dead and 104 wounded.

The belligerents then became locked in static trench warfare akin to the First World War, in which men lived in tunnels, redoubts, and sandbagged forts behind barbed wire defences. From 1951 until the end of the war, 3 RAR held trenches on the eastern side of the division's positions in the hills northeast of the Imjin River. Across from them were heavily fortified Chinese positions. In March 1952, Australia increased its ground commitment to two battalions, sending 1 RAR. This battalion remained in Korea for 12 months, before being replaced by 2 RAR in April 1953. The Australians fought their last battle during 24–26 July 1953, with 2 RAR holding off a concerted Chinese attack along the Samichon River and inflicting significant casualties for the loss of five killed and 24 wounded. Hostilities were suspended on 27 July 1953. 17,808 Australians served during the war, with 341 killed, 1,216 wounded and 30 captured.

==== Malayan Emergency, 1950–60 ====
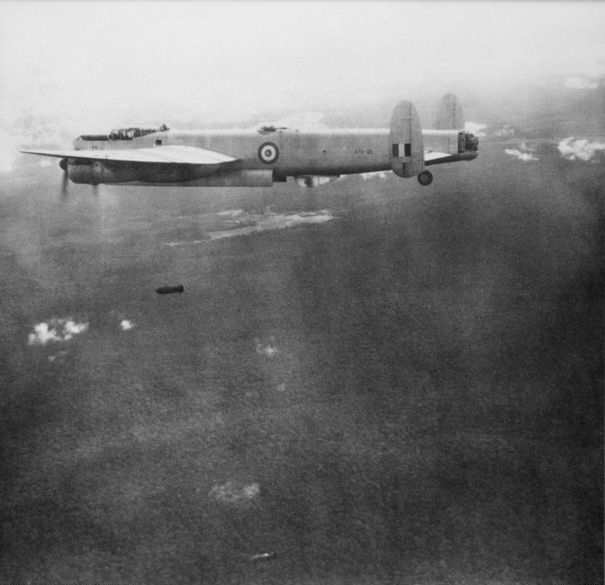
A Lincoln from No. 1 Squadron RAAF bombing communist targets during the Malayan Emergency, c. 1950.

The Malayan Emergency was declared on 18 June 1948, after three estate managers were murdered by members of the Malayan Communist Party (MCP). Australian involvement began in June 1950, when in response to a British request, six Lincolns from No. 1 Squadron and a flight of Dakotas from No. 38 Squadron arrived in Singapore to form part of the British Commonwealth Far East Air Force (FEAF). The Dakotas were subsequently used on cargo runs, troop movement, as well as paratroop and leaflet drops, while the Lincoln bombers carried out bombing raids against the Communist Terrorist (CT) jungle bases. The RAAF were particularly successful, and in one such mission known as Operation Termite, five Lincoln bombers destroyed 181 communist camps, killed 13 communists and forced one into surrender, in a joint operation with the RAF and ground troops. The Lincolns were withdrawn in 1958, and were replaced by Canberra bombers from No. 2 Squadron and CAC Sabres from No. 78 Wing. Based at RAAF Base Butterworth they also carried out a number ground attack missions against the guerrillas.

Australian ground forces were deployed to Malaya in October 1955 as part of the Far East Strategic Reserve. In January 1956, the first Australian ground forces were deployed on Malaysian peninsula, consisting of the 2nd Battalion, Royal Australian Regiment (2 RAR). 2 RAR mainly participated in "mopping up" operations over the next 20 months, conducting extensive patrolling in and near the CT jungle bases, as part of 28th British Commonwealth Brigade. Contact with the enemy was infrequent and results small, achieving relatively few kills. 2 RAR left Malaysia October 1957 to be replaced by 3 RAR. 3 RAR underwent six weeks of jungle training and began driving MCP insurgents back into the jungle of Perak and Kedah. The new battalion extensively patrolled and was involved in food denial operations and ambushes. Again contact was limited, although 3 RAR had more success than its predecessor. By late 1959, operations against the MCP were in their final phase, and most communists had been pushed back and across the Thailand border. 3 RAR left Malaysia October 1959 and was replaced by 1 RAR. Though patrolling the border 1 RAR did not make contact with the insurgents, and in October 1960 it was replaced by 2 RAR, which stayed in Malaysia until August 1963. The Malayan Emergency officially ended on 31 July 1960.

Australia also provided artillery and engineer support, along with an air-field construction squadron. The Royal Australian Navy also served in Malayan waters, firing on suspected communist positions between 1956 and 1957. The Emergency was the longest continued commitment in Australian military history; 7,000 Australians served and 51 died in Malaya—although only 15 were on operations—and another 27 were wounded.

==== Military and Naval growth during the 1960s ====
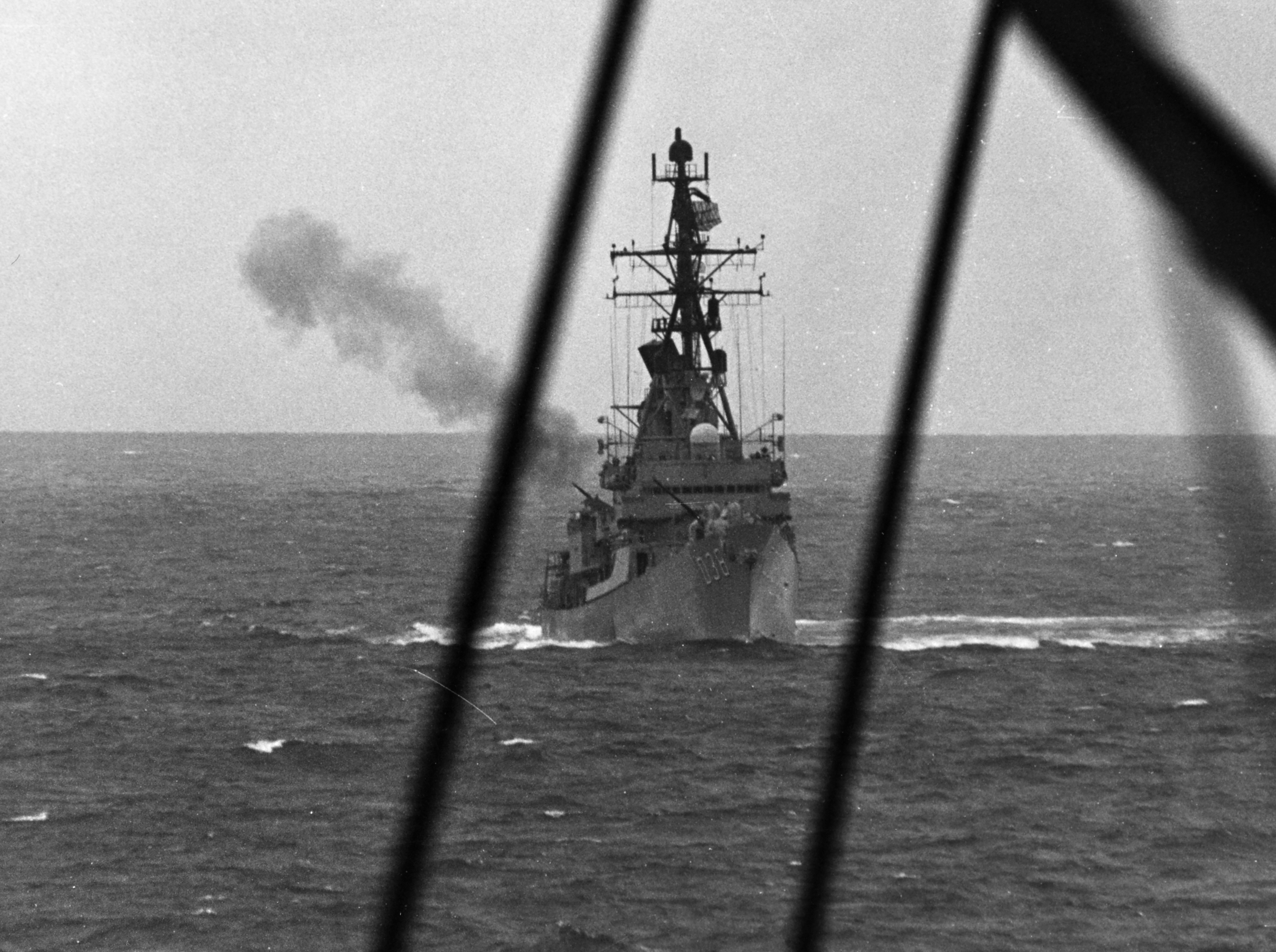
HMAS Perth firing on North Vietnamese targets in 1968. Perth joined the fleet in 1965 as part of the RAN's naval expansion program.

At the start of the 1960s, Prime Minister Robert Menzies greatly expanded the Australian military so that it could carry out the Government's policy of "Forward Defence" in South East Asia. In 1964, Menzies announced a large increase in defence spending. The strength of the Australian Army would be increased by 50% over three years from 22,000 to 33,000; providing a full three-brigade division with nine battalions. The RAAF and RAN would also both be increased by 25%. In 1964, conscription or National Service was re-introduced under the National Service Act, for selected 20-year-olds based on date of birth, for a period of two years' continuous full-time service (the previous scheme having been suspended in 1959).

In 1961, three Charles F. Adams-class destroyers were purchased from the United States to replace the ageing Q-class destroyers. Traditionally, the RAN had purchased designs based on those of the Royal Navy and the purchase of American destroyers was significant. HMAS Perth and HMAS Hobart joined the fleet in 1965, followed by HMAS Brisbane in 1967. Other projects included the construction of six River-class frigates, the conversion of the aircraft carrier HMAS Melbourne to an anti-submarine role, the acquisition of ten Wessex helicopters, and the purchase of six Oberon-class submarines.

The RAAF took delivery of their first Mirage fighters in 1967, equipping No. 3, No. 75 and No. 77 Squadrons with them. The service also received American F-111 strike aircraft, C-130 Hercules transports, P-3 Orion maritime reconnaissance aircraft and Italian Macchi trainers.

==== Indonesia-Malaysia Confrontation, 1962–66 ====
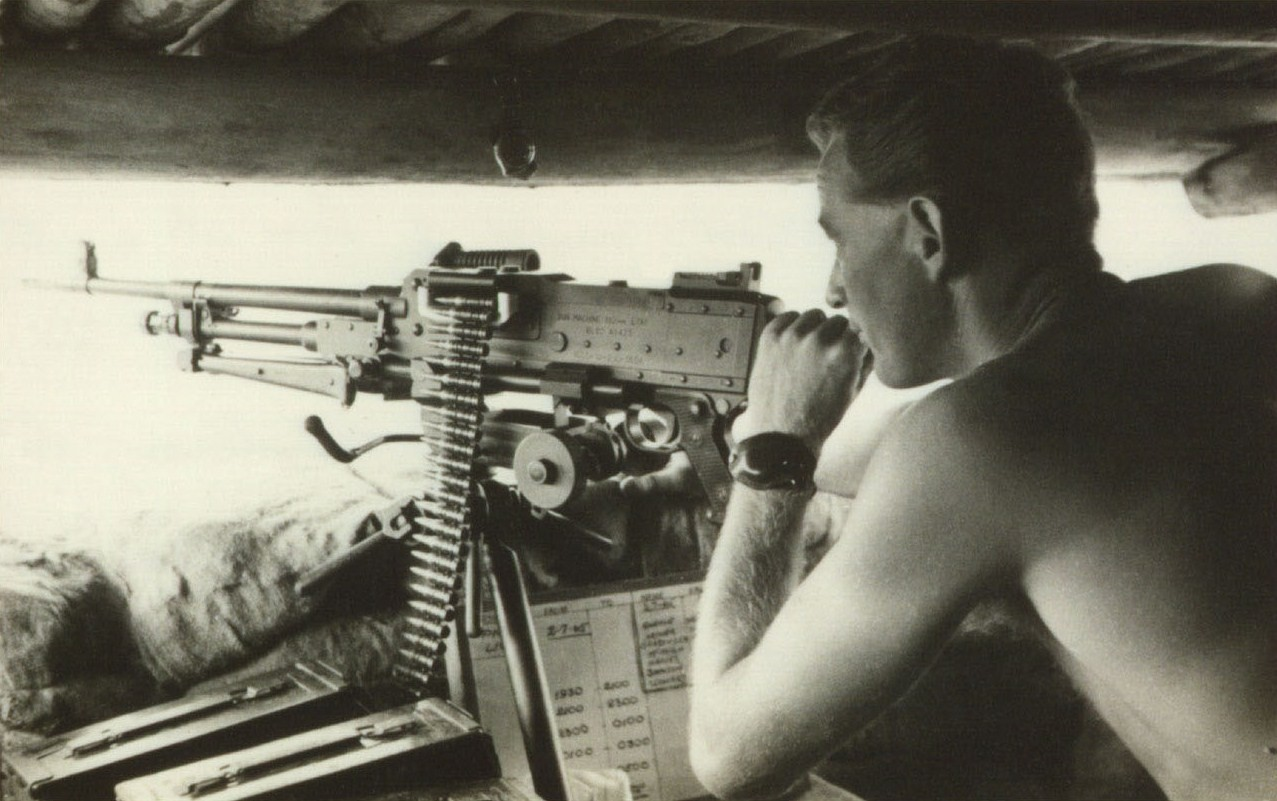
An Australian soldier manning the machine gun while on guard duty in Borneo during 1965

The Indonesia-Malaysia confrontation was fought from 1962 to 1966 between the British Commonwealth and Indonesia over the creation of the Federation of Malaysia, with the Commonwealth attempting to safeguard the security of the new state. The war remained limited, and was fought primarily on the island of Borneo, although a number of Indonesian seaborne and airborne incursions onto the Malay Peninsula did occur. As part of Australia's continuing military commitment to the security of Malaysia, army, naval and airforce units were based there as part of the Far East Strategic Reserve. Regardless the Australian government was wary of involvement in a war with Indonesia and initially limited its involvement to the defence of the Malayan peninsula only. On two occasions Australian troops from 3 RAR were used to help mop up infiltrators from seaborne and airborne incursions at Labis and Pontian, in September and October 1964.

Following these raids the government conceded to British and Malaysian requests to deploy an infantry battalion to Borneo. During the early phases, British and Malaysian troops had attempted only to control the Malaysian/Indonesian border, and to protect population centres. However, by the time the Australian battalion deployed the British had decided on more aggressive action, crossing the border into Kalimantan to obtain information and conduct ambushes to force the Indonesians to remain on the defensive, under the codename Operation Claret. The fighting took place in mountainous, jungle-clad terrain, and a debilitating climate, with operations characterised by the extensive use of company bases sited along the border, cross-border operations, the use of helicopters for troop movement and resupply, and the role of human and signals intelligence to determine enemy movements and intentions.

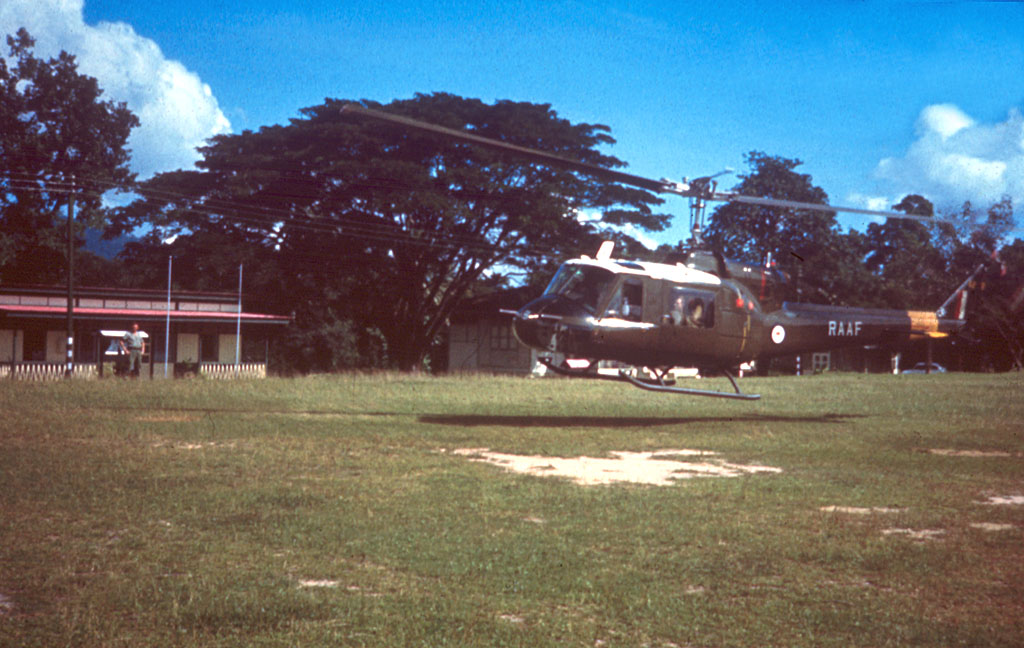
A RAAF UH-1 Iroquois landing at Terendak Camp in 1964.

3 RAR deployed to Borneo in March 1965, and served in Sarawak until the end of July, operating on both sides of the border. The battalion had four major contacts with Indonesian forces and several smaller ones—including at Sungei Koemba, Kindau and Babang during which they inflicted heavy casualties on the Indonesians—as well as suffering casualties in two mine incidents. 4 RAR served a less-eventful tour between April and August 1966, and also operated over the border, successfully clashing with the Indonesians on a number of occasions. A squadron of the Special Air Service Regiment (SASR) was also deployed in 1965 and again in 1966, taking part in cross-border operations and inflicting significant casualties on the Indonesians, even though they were often tasked with covert reconnaissance. Other units included artillery and engineers, while a number of RAN ships were involved in shelling Indonesian positions in Borneo and in repelling infiltrators in the Singapore Strait. The RAAF played a relatively minor role, although it would have been used far more extensively had the war escalated. (Note: A number of contingency plans existed, although none were ever fully implemented. For instance: Plan Spillikin, Plan Hemley, Plan Shalstone (renamed Mason), Plan Addington, and Plan Althorpe. These plans called for different levels of commitment depending on different contingencies, including using the majority of Australian air, land and naval forces in the Strategic Reserve, such as the Canberra bombers already based at Butterworth, as well involvement in the defence of Malaysian airspace from Indonesian attacks, air attacks on Indonesian bases by Australian aircraft flying from Australian bases and even the use of facilities in Darwin by the RAF Strategic V Bomber Force. See Dennis and Grey 1996, p. 196.)

Operations in Borneo were extremely sensitive and they received little press coverage in Australia, while official acknowledgement of involvement in cross-border missions only occurred in 1996. Following a military coup in Indonesia in early 1966 which brought General Suharto to power, a peace treaty was signed in August 1966 which ended the conflict. 3,500 Australians served during Confrontation; casualties included 16 dead, with seven killed in action and eight wounded.

==== Vietnam War, 1962–73 ====
An iconic image of Australian soldiers from 7 RAR waiting to be picked up by UH-1 Iroquois helicopters following a routine cordon and search operation.

Australia's involvement in the Vietnam War was driven largely by the rise of communism in Southeast Asia after the Second World War, and the fear of its spread which developed in Australia during the 1950s and early 1960s. As a consequence, Australia supported South Vietnam throughout the early 1960s. In 1961 and 1962, the leader of the South Vietnamese government, Ngo Dinh Diem, asked for assistance from the US and its allies in response to a growing insurgency supported by communist North Vietnam. Australia offered 30 military advisors from the Australian Army Training Team Vietnam, which became known simply as "The Team". They arrived in July and August 1962, beginning Australia's involvement in the war. Later in August 1964, the RAAF sent a flight of Caribou transport aircraft to the port city of Vung Tau.

However, with the security situation in South Vietnam continuing to deteriorate, the US increased its involvement to 200,000 combat troops by early 1965. Australia also committed ground forces, dispatching the 1 RAR to serve with the US 173rd Airborne Brigade in Bien Hoa province in June 1965 and it subsequently fought a number of significant actions, including Gang Toi, Operation Crimp and Suoi Bong Trang. In March 1966, the Australian government announced the deployment of a brigade-sized unit—the 1st Australian Task Force (1 ATF)—to replace 1 RAR. Included were a large number of conscripts, under the increasingly controversial National Service Scheme. Consisting of two infantry battalions as well as armour, aviation, artillery and other support arms, the task force was assigned primary responsibility for its own area and was based at Nui Dat, in Phuoc Tuy Province. Included were the Iroquois helicopters of No. 9 Squadron RAAF. At the Battle of Long Tan on 18 August 1966, D Company, 6 RAR with considerable artillery support held off and defeated a Viet Cong force that was at least six times bigger than itself. 18 Australians were killed and 24 wounded, while 245 communist dead were later recovered from the battlefield. The battle allowed the Australians to gain dominance over Phuoc Tuy Province and 1 ATF was not fundamentally challenged again. Regardless, during February 1967 the Australians suffered their heaviest casualties in the war to that point, losing 16 men killed and 55 wounded in a single week, the bulk during Operation Bribie.

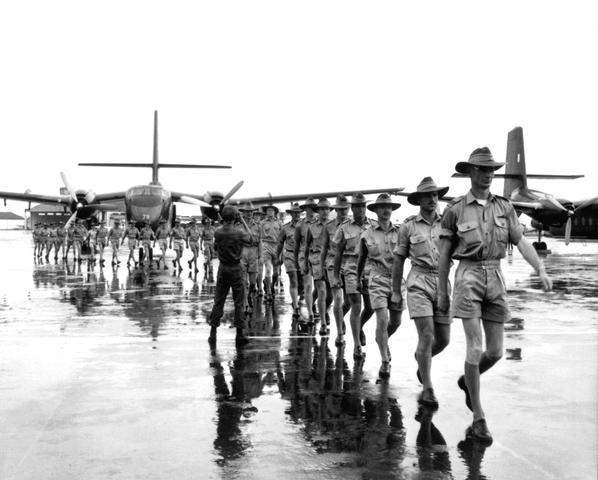
Personnel and aircraft of RAAF Transport Flight Vietnam arrive in South Vietnam in 1964.

Yet with the Phuoc Tuy province coming progressively under control throughout 1967, the Australians increasingly spent a significant period of time conducting operations further afield. 1 ATF was subsequently deployed astride infiltration routes leading to Saigon to interdict communist movement against the capital as part of Operation Coburg during the 1968 Tet Offensive and later during the Battle of Coral–Balmoral in May and June 1968. At Fire Support Bases Coral and Balmoral the Australians had clashed with regular North Vietnamese Army and Viet Cong main force units operating in battalion and regimental strength for the first time in near conventional warfare, ultimately fighting their largest, most hazardous and most sustained battle of the war. During 26 days of fighting Australian casualties included 25 killed and 99 wounded, while communist casualties included 267 killed confirmed by body count, 60 possibly killed, 7 wounded and 11 captured. Other significant Australian actions included Binh Ba in June 1969, Hat Dich in late-December 1968 and early 1969 and Long Khanh in June 1971. At the height of the Australian commitment, 1 ATF numbered 8,500 troops, including three infantry battalions, armour, artillery, engineers, logistics and aviation units in support. A third RAAF unit, No. 2 Squadron RAAF, flying Canberra bombers, was sent in 1967, and four RAN destroyers joined US patrols in the waters off North Vietnam.

The Australian withdrawal effectively commenced in November 1970. As a consequence of the overall allied strategy of Vietnamization and with the Australian government keen to reduce its own commitment to the war, 8 RAR was not replaced at the end of its tour of duty. 1 ATF was again reduced to just two infantry battalions, albeit with significant armour, artillery and aviation support remaining. Australian combat forces were further reduced during 1971 as part of a phased withdrawal, and 1 ATF ceased operations in October. Meanwhile, the advisors remained to train South Vietnamese troops until withdrawn on 18 December 1972 by the newly elected Labor government of Gough Whitlam. The last Australian forces were finally withdrawn in 1973. The Vietnam War was Australia's longest and most controversial war and although initially enjoying broad support, as the nation's military involvement increased a vocal anti-war movement developed. More than 50,000 Australians served in Vietnam; 519 were killed and 2,398 were wounded. Four were awarded the Victoria Cross.

=== Post-Vietnam era ===
==== Creation of the Australian Defence Force, 1976 ====
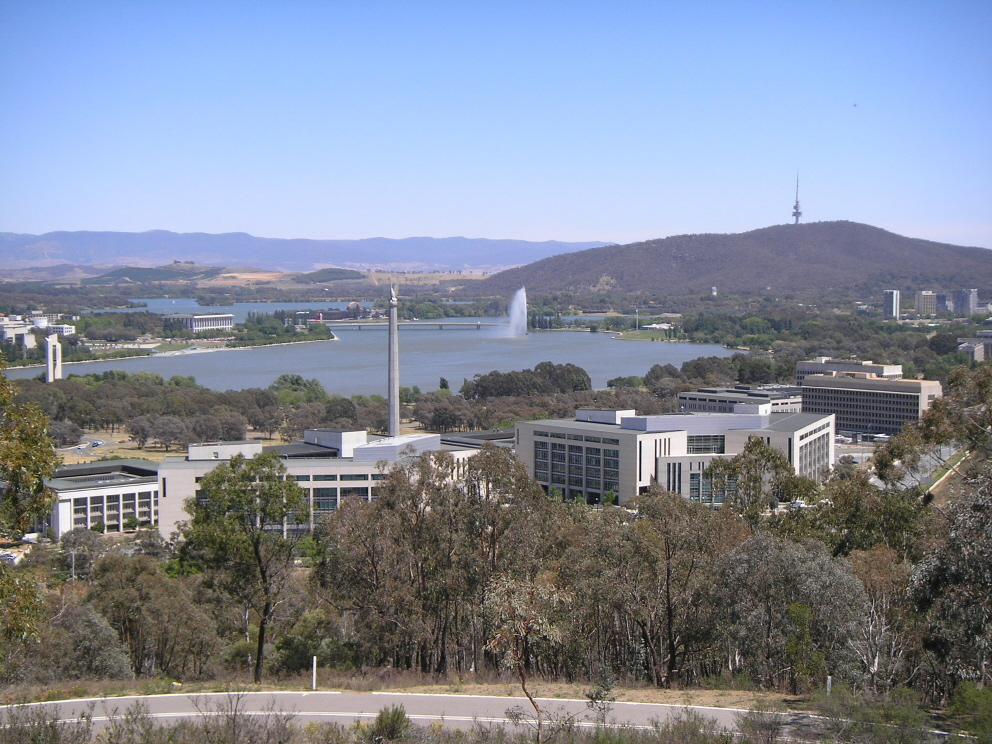
The Russell Offices complex in Canberra houses the Australian Defence Force administrative headquarters. The three military branches amalgamated into the ADF in 1976.

Although the importance of 'joint' warfare had been highlighted during Second World War when Australian naval, ground and air units frequently served as part of single commands, the absence of a central authority continued to result in poor co-ordination between the services in the post-war era, with each organising and operating on the basis of a different military doctrine. The need for an integrated command structure received more emphasis during the Australian military's experiences in the Vietnam War. In 1973, the Secretary of the Department of Defence, Arthur Tange, submitted a report to the Government that recommended the unification of the separate departments supporting each service into a single department and the creation of the post of Chief of the Defence Force Staff.

The Whitlam Labor Government subsequently amalgamated the five defence ministries (Defence, Navy, Army, Air Force, and Supply) into a single Department of Defence in 1973, while conscription under the National Service scheme was abolished. On 1 January 1976, the three branches of the Australian military were brought together as a unified, all-volunteer, professional force known as the Australian Defence Force (ADF). Today, the ADF is headquartered at Russell Offices in Canberra and is divided into Air, Land, Maritime and Special Operations Commands. In addition, Northern Command is based in Darwin, and is responsible for operations in Northern Australia.

==== Defence of Australia, 1980s and 1990s ====
Until the 1970s, Australia's military strategy centred on the concept of Forward Defence, in which the role of Australian military and naval forces were to co-operate with Allied forces to counter threats in Australia's region. Following the adoption of the Guam Doctrine by the United States in 1969, and the British withdrawal 'east of Suez' in the early 1970s, Australia developed a defence policy emphasising self-reliance and the defence of the Australian continent. Known as the Defence of Australia Policy, it focused Australian defence planning on protecting the nation's northern maritime approaches (the 'air-sea gap') against possible attack.

In line with this goal, the ADF was restructured to increase its ability to strike at enemy forces from Australian bases and to counter raids on continental Australia. This was achieved by increasing the capabilities of the RAN and RAAF, and relocating regular Army units to Northern Australia. During this time the ADF had no military units on operational deployment outside Australia. However, in 1987 the ADF made its first operational deployment as part of Operation Morris Dance, in which several warships and a rifle company deployed to the waters off Fiji in response to the 1987 Fijian coups d'état. While broadly successful, this deployment highlighted the need for the ADF to improve its capability to rapidly respond to unforeseen events.

During this period Australia continued to retain forces in Malaysia as part of the Five Power Defence Arrangements (FPDA) agreed in 1971 to defend it in the event of external attack, with this commitment initially including significant air, ground and naval forces. However, these forces were gradually reduced with the infantry battalion withdrawn from Singapore in 1973, and the two Mirage fighter squadrons in 1988. Since then a detachment of Orion maritime patrol aircraft, support personnel, and an infantry company known as Rifle Company Butterworth have been maintained, as well as occasional deployments of F/A-18 Hornet fighter aircraft. Australian submarines reportedly undertook a number of clandestine surveillance missions throughout Asian waters in the last decades of the Cold War. Airforce and Navy units were also involved in tracking Soviet ship and submarine movements in the region. Since then the Orions have continued to participate in maritime security operations as part of Operation Gateway, conducting patrols over the Indian Ocean, Strait of Malacca and South China Sea. They have reportedly also been involved in freedom of navigation flights.

==== Gulf War, 1991 ====
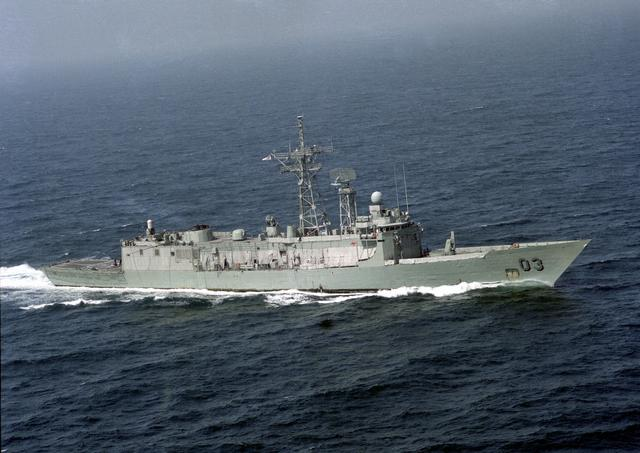
HMAS Sydney in the Persian Gulf in 1991.

Australia was a member of the international coalition which contributed military forces to the 1991 Gulf War, deploying a naval task group of two warships, a support ship and a clearance diving team; in total about 750 personnel. The Australian contribution was the first time Australian personnel were deployed to an active war zone since the establishment of the ADF and the deployment tested its capabilities and command structure. However, the Australian force did not see combat, and instead playing a significant role in enforcing the sanctions put in place against Iraq following the invasion of Kuwait. Some ADF personnel serving on exchange with British and American units did see combat, and a few were later decorated for their actions. Following the war, the Navy regularly deployed a frigate to the Persian Gulf or Red Sea to enforce the trade sanctions which continued to be applied to Iraq. A number of Australian airmen and ground crew posted to or on exchange with US and British air forces subsequently participated in enforcing no-fly zones imposed over Iraq between 1991 and 2003.

=== Global security, late-1990s ===
Since the late 1980s, the Australian government had increasingly called upon the ADF to contribute forces to peacekeeping missions around the world. While most of these deployments involved only small numbers of specialists, several led to the deployment of hundreds of personnel. Large peacekeeping deployments were made to Namibia in early 1989, Cambodia between 1992 and 1993, Somalia in 1993, Rwanda between 1994 and 1995 and Bougainville in 1994 and from 1997 onwards. The 1996 election of the Howard Liberal government resulted in significant reforms to the ADF's force structure and role, with the new government's defence strategy placed less singular emphasis on defending Australia from direct attack and greater emphasis on working in co-operation with regional states and Australia's allies to manage potential security threats in recognition of Australia's global security interests. In line with this new focus, the ADF's force structure changed in an attempt to increase the proportion of combat units to support units and to improve the ADF's combat effectiveness.

=== 21st Century ===
==== East Timor, 1999–2013 ====
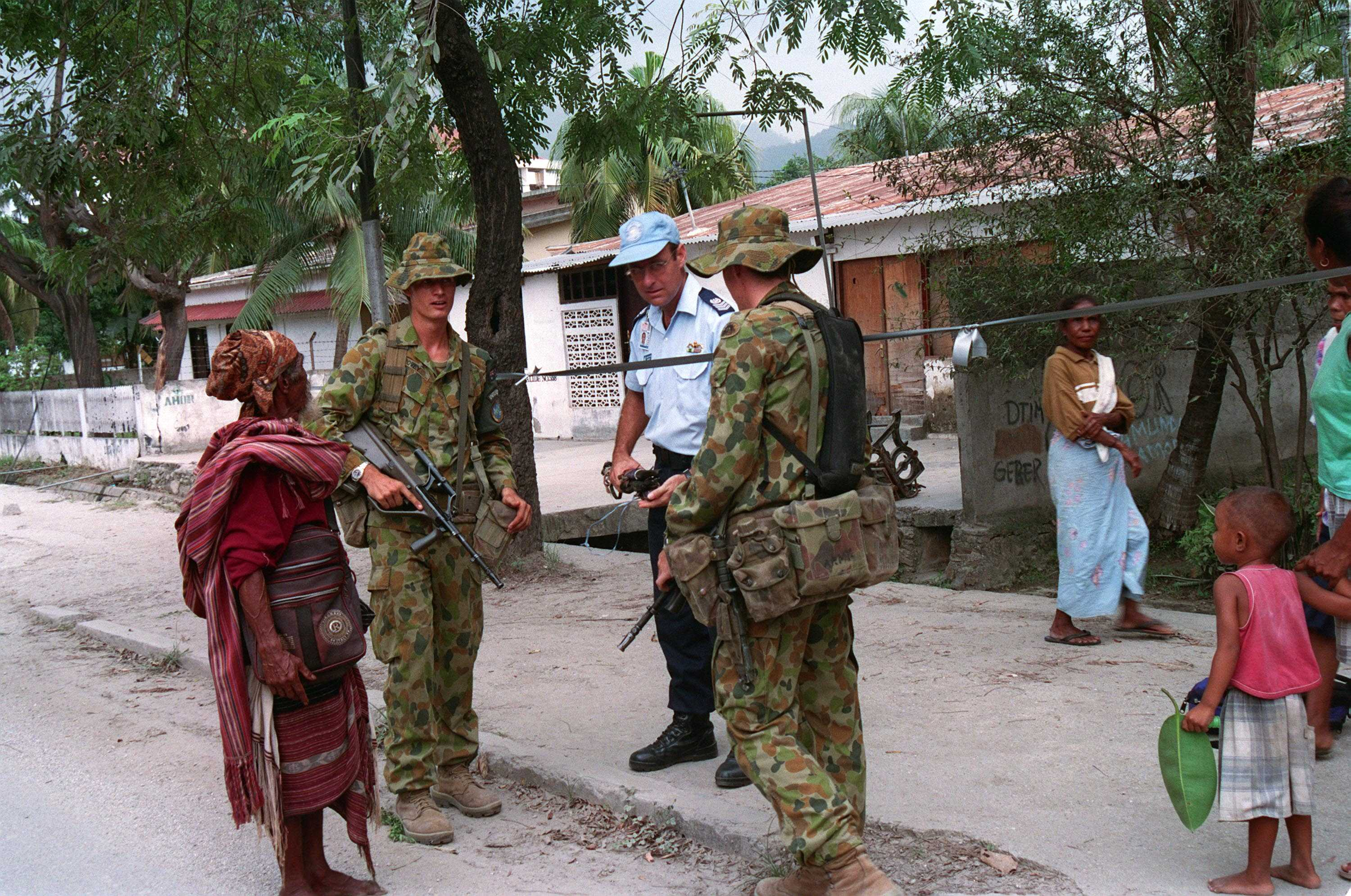
Australian members of International Force East Timor, 2000.

The former-Portuguese colony of East Timor was invaded by Indonesia in 1975, however, following years of violent struggle the new Indonesian government of President B.J. Habibie subsequently agreed to allow the East Timorese to vote on autonomy in 1999. The United Nations Mission in East Timor (UNAMET) was established to organise and conduct the vote, which was held at the end of August 1999 and resulted with 78.5% of voters deciding in favour of independence. However, following the announcement of the results pro-Indonesian militias supported by elements of the Indonesian military, launched a campaign of violence, looting and arson and many East Timorese were killed, while perhaps more than 500,000 were displaced. Unable to control the violence, Indonesia subsequently agreed to the deployment of a multinational peacekeeping force. Australia, which had contributed police to UNAMET, organised and led an international military coalition, known as the International Force for East Timor (INTERFET), a non-UN force operating in accordance with UN resolutions. The total size of the Australian force committed numbered 5,500 personnel, and included a significant ground force, supported by air and naval forces, in the largest single deployment of Australian forces since 1945.

Under the overall command of Australian Major General Peter Cosgrove, INTERFET began arriving on 12 September 1999 and was tasked with restoring peace and security, protecting and supporting UNAMET, and facilitating humanitarian assistance operations. With the withdrawal of the Indonesian armed forces, police and government officials from East Timor, UNAMET re-established its headquarters in Dili on 28 September. On 19 October 1999, Indonesia formally recognised the result of the referendum and shortly thereafter a UN peacekeeping force, the United Nations Transitional Administration in East Timor (UNTAET) was established, becoming fully responsible for the administration of East Timor during its transition to independence. The hand-over of command of military operations from INTERFET to UNTAET was completed on 28 February 2000. Australia continued to support the UN peacekeeping operation with between 1,500 and 2,000 personnel, as well as landing craft and Blackhawk helicopters and remained the largest contributor of personnel to the peacekeeping mission. During these operations Australian forces regularly clashed with pro-Indonesian militia and on a number of occasions Indonesian forces as well, especially along the border with West Timor. Significant actions occurred in Suai, Mota'ain and at Aidabasalala in October 1999. However, with the security situation stabilised the bulk of the Australian and UN forces were withdrawn by 2005. Two Australians died from non-battle related causes, while a number were wounded in action.

An Australian in Same, East Timor, shortly after the Battle of Same, 2007.

The unexpected deployment to East Timor in 1999 led to significant changes in Australian defence policy and to an enhancement of the ADF's ability to conduct operations outside Australia. This successful deployment was the first time a large Australian military force had operated outside of Australia since the Vietnam War and revealed shortcomings in the ADF's ability to mount and sustain such operations. In response, the 2000 Defence White Paper placed a greater emphasis on preparing the ADF for overseas deployments. The Australian government committed to improve the ADF's capabilities by improving the readiness and equipment of ADF units, expanding the ADF to 57,000 full-time personnel and increasing real Defence expenditure by 3% per year.

In May 2006, 2,000 ADF personnel were again deployed to East Timor as part of Operation Astute, following unrest between elements of the Timor Leste Defence Force. Australian forces were involved in a number skirmishes during this time, including a heavy clash with rebels commanded by Alfredo Reinado at Same on 4 March 2007. However, by early-2010 the security situation had been stabilised and just 400 Australian personnel remained to train the local security forces as part of a small international force. Following a drawdown, the International Stabilisation Force commenced withdrawing from Timor-Leste in November 2012, a process which was completed in April 2013.

==== Afghanistan, 2001–2021 ====
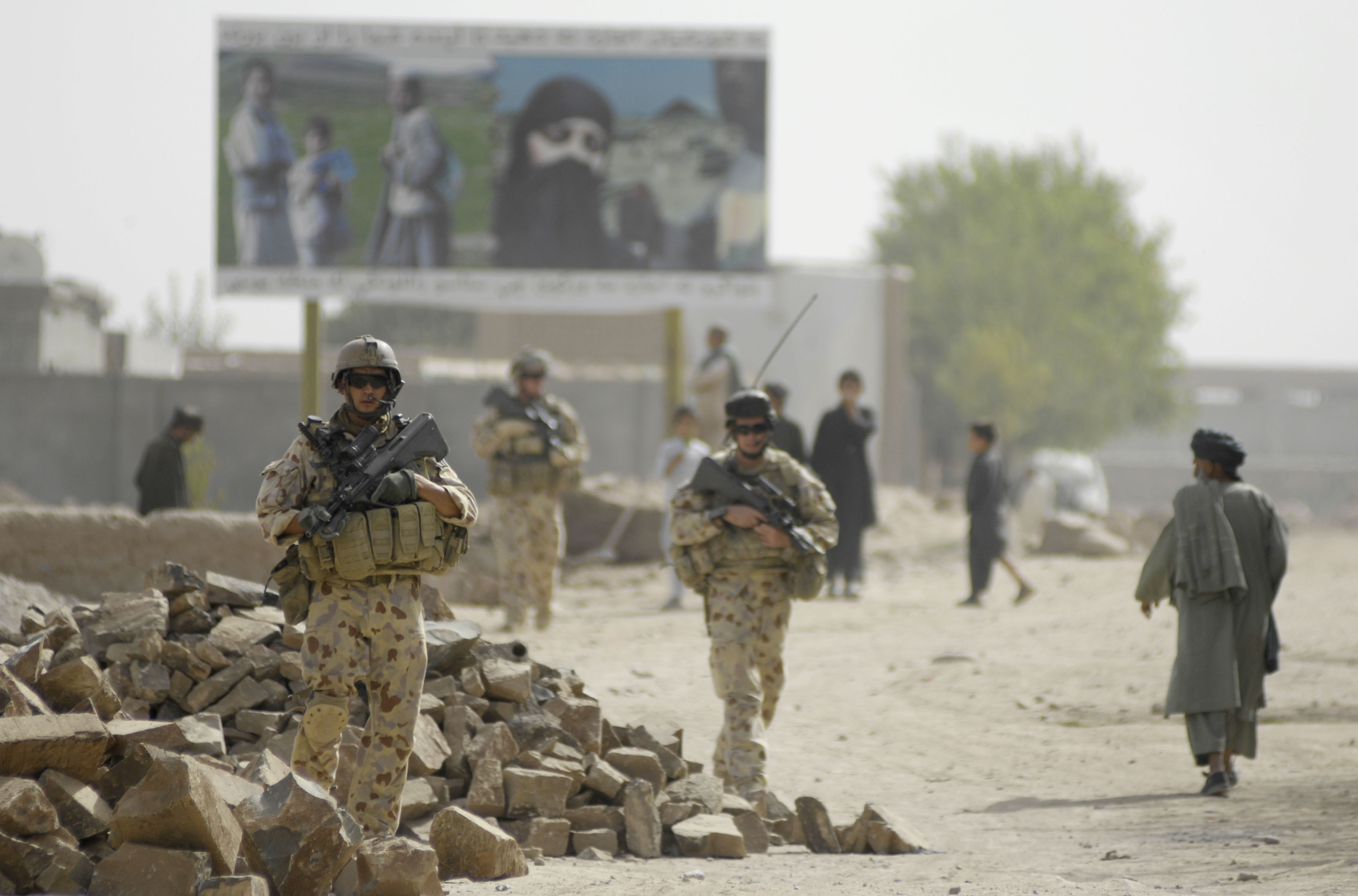
Members of 3 RAR on a foot patrol in Tarinkot, 2008.

Shortly after the Islamist inspired terrorist attacks in New York and Washington on 11 September 2001, Australian forces were committed to the American-led international coalition against terrorism. The ADF's most visible contribution—codenamed Operation Slipper—has been a special forces task group operating in Afghanistan from 2001 to 2002 and again from mid-2005 to fight against the Taliban. Over time the Australian commitment has grown, with the addition of further ground forces in the form of a Reconstruction Task Force from 2006 to provide security, reconstruction and to mentor and train the Afghan National Army. Australia has also contributed a frigate and two AP-3C Orion surveillance aircraft and three C-130 Hercules transport aircraft to international operations in the Persian Gulf and Indian Ocean since 2001, supporting both the operations in Afghanistan and those in Iraq under Operation Catalyst. A detachment of four F/A-18 Hornet fighter-bombers was based at Diego Garcia from late-2001 to mid-2002, while two Boeing 707 air-to-air refuelling aircraft were also based in Manas Air Base in Kyrgyzstan to provide support to coalition aircraft operating in Afghan airspace but were later withdrawn. A Special Operations Task Group was deployed to support the Reconstruction Taskforce in April 2007. In addition to radar crews, logistics and intelligence officers, and security personnel, this brought the number of Australian personnel in Afghanistan to 950 by mid-2007, with further small increases to 1,000 in mid-2008, 1,100 in early 2009 and 1,550 in mid-2009.

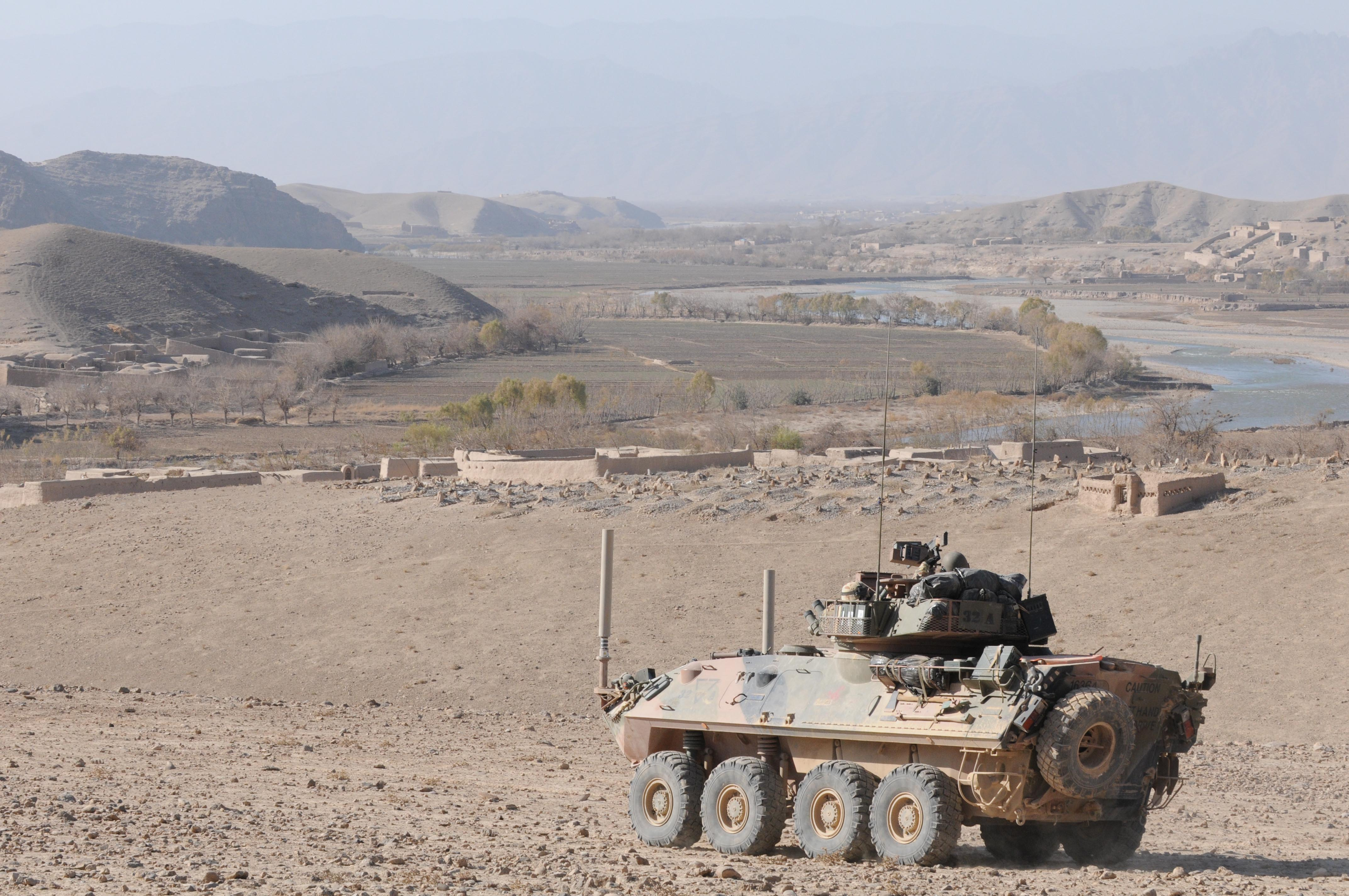
An ASLAV providing security for ground troops in the Tangi Valley in 2010.

A modest force remained in Afghanistan over this time and was involved in counter-insurgency operations in Uruzgan Province in conjunction United States and other coalition forces, including the Dutch prior to their withdrawal. The force consisted of motorised infantry, special forces, engineers, cavalry, artillery and aviation elements. By 2010 it included a combined arms battalion-sized battle group known as the Mentoring Task Force, and the Special Operations Task Group, both based at Forward Operation Base Ripley outside of Tarin Kowt, as well as the Rotary Wing Group flying CH-47D Chinooks, the Force Logistics Asset and an RAAF air surveillance radar unit based in Kandahar. In addition, a further 800 Australian logistic personnel were also based in the Middle East in support, but located outside of Afghanistan. Meanwhile, detachments of maritime patrol and transport aircraft continued to support operations in Iraq and Afghanistan, based out of Al Minhad Air Base in the United Arab Emirates. Also included was one of the RAN's frigates deployed to the Arabian Sea and Gulf of Aden on counter piracy and maritime interdiction duties. (Note: These ships are deployed as part of the US-led Combined Maritime Forces. Headquartered in Bahrain, the coalition operates three naval task forces in the Red Sea, Gulf of Aden, Arabian Sea, Indian Ocean and Gulf of Oman, being Combined Task Force 150 (CTF 150) – maritime security and counter-terrorism, Combined Task Force 151 (CTF 151) – counter-piracy, and Combined Task Force 152 (CTF 152) – maritime security operations in the Persian Gulf. See "ADF at the helm of maritime counter-terrorism taskforce" (Press release). Department of Defence. 10 December 2015.)

Australian forces were at times involved in heavy fighting, and significant actions included Operation Anaconda in 2002 and Operation Perth in 2006, as well as actions in Chora in 2007, Kakarak in 2009, the Shah Wali Kot and Derapet in 2010, and Doan in 2011; although others have yet to be publicly acknowledged due to operational security requirements. Casualties include 41 killed and 256 wounded, while another Australian also died serving with the British Army. Four Australians have been awarded the Victoria Cross for Australia, the first such decorations in forty years. Following a drawdown in forces, the last combat troops were withdrawn on 15 December 2013; however, approximately 400 personnel remain in Afghanistan as trainers and advisers, and are stationed in Kandahar and Kabul. Over 26,000 Australian personnel have served in Afghanistan.

In November 2020, a report for the Inspector-General of the Australian Defence Force by Major General Paul Brereton, a New South Wales Court of Appeal judge, found credible information that 25 current or former members of the ADF were involved in, or accessories to, the murder of 39 Afghan prisoners and civilians, and the cruel treatment of two others. None of these matters occurred in the "heat of battle". Brereton's inquiry took four and a half years to complete, and involved the interviewing of 423 witnesses, the examination of more than 20,000 documents and 25,000 images, regarding conduct in Afghanistan between 2005 and 2016. It recommended that 36 incidents be referred to the AFP for criminal investigation. The report, released in heavily redacted form on 19 November by the Chief of the Defence Force, General Angus Campbell. Campbell offered an apology for "any wrongdoing by Australian soldiers", and highlighted that the matters predominantly involved the SASR. He summarised the report by saying that "It is alleged that some patrols took the law into their own hands, rules were broken, stories concocted, lies told and prisoners killed", and said that practices developed in order to conceal deliberate unlawful killings. On 26 November, it was reported that Defence had commenced administrative action against at least 10 serving members of the SASR, issuing them with "show cause" notices for their dismissal.

==== Iraq, 2003–11 ====
Australian forces later joined British and American forces during the 2003 invasion of Iraq. The initial contribution was also a modest one, consisting of just 2,058 personnel—codenamed Operation Falconer. Major force elements included special forces, rotary and fixed wing aviation and naval units. Army units included elements from the SASR and 4th Battalion, Royal Australian Regiment (Commando), a CH-47 Chinook detachment and a number of other specialist units. RAN units included the amphibious ship HMAS Kanimbla and the frigates HMAS Darwin and HMAS Anzac, while the RAAF deployed 14 F/A-18 Hornets from No. 75 Squadron, a number of AP-3C Orions and C-130 Hercules. The Australian Special Forces Task Force was one of the first coalition units forces to cross the border into Iraq, while for a few days, the closest ground troops to Baghdad were from the SASR. During the invasion the RAAF also flew its first combat missions since the Vietnam War, with No. 75 Squadron flying a total of 350 sorties and dropping 122 laser-guided bombs.

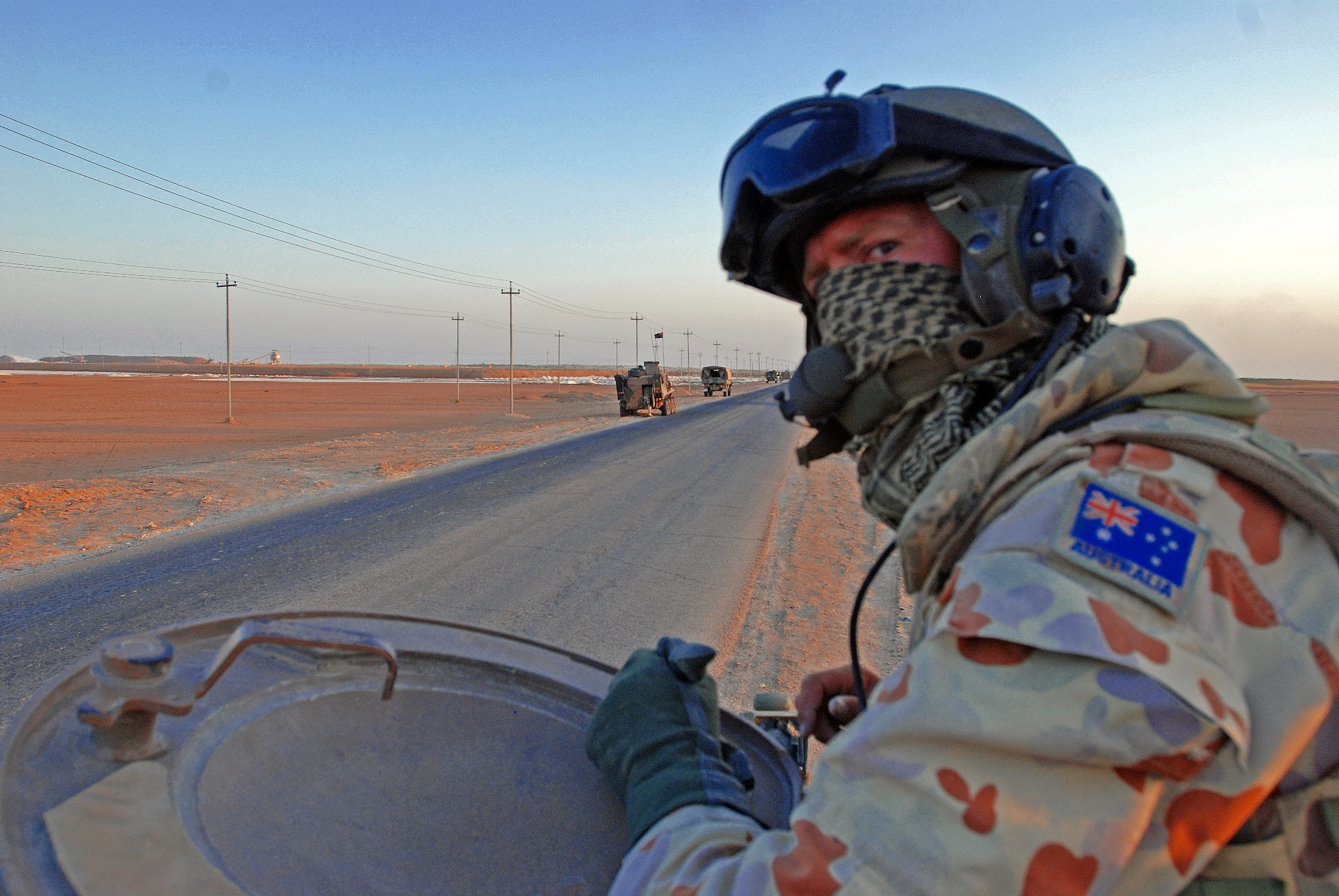
An Australian cavalry scout in Iraq in October 2007.

The Iraqi military quickly proved no match for coalition military power, and with their defeat the bulk of Australian forces were withdrawn. While Australia did not initially take part in the post-war occupation of Iraq, an Australian Army light armoured battlegroup—designated the Al Muthanna Task Group and including 40 ASLAV light armoured vehicles and infantry—was later deployed to Southern Iraq in April 2005 as part of Operation Catalyst. The role of this force was to protect the Japanese engineer contingent in the region and support the training of New Iraqi Army units. The AMTG later became the Overwatch Battle Group (West) (OBG(W)), following the hand back of Al Muthanna province to Iraqi control. Force levels peaked at 1,400 personnel in May 2007 including the OBG(W) in Southern Iraq, the Security Detachment in Baghdad and the Australian Army Training Team—Iraq. A RAN frigate was based in the North Persian Gulf, while RAAF assets included C-130H Hercules and AP-3C elements. Following the election of a new Labor government under Prime Minister Kevin Rudd the bulk of these forces were withdrawn by mid-2009, while RAAF and RAN operations were redirected to other parts of the Middle East Area of Operations as part of Operation Slipper.

Low-level operations continued, however, with a small Australian force of 80 soldiers remaining in Iraq to protect the Australian Embassy in Baghdad as part of SECDET under Operation Kruger. SECDET was finally withdrawn in August 2011, and was replaced by a private military company which took over responsibility for providing security for Australia's diplomatic presence in Iraq. Although more than 17,000 personnel served during operations in Iraq, Australian casualties were relatively light, with two soldiers accidentally killed, while a third Australian died serving with the British Royal Air Force. A further 27 personnel were wounded. Two officers remained in Iraq attached to the United Nations Assistance Mission for Iraq as part of Operation Riverbank. This operation concluded in November 2013.

==== Military intervention against ISIL, 2014–present ====
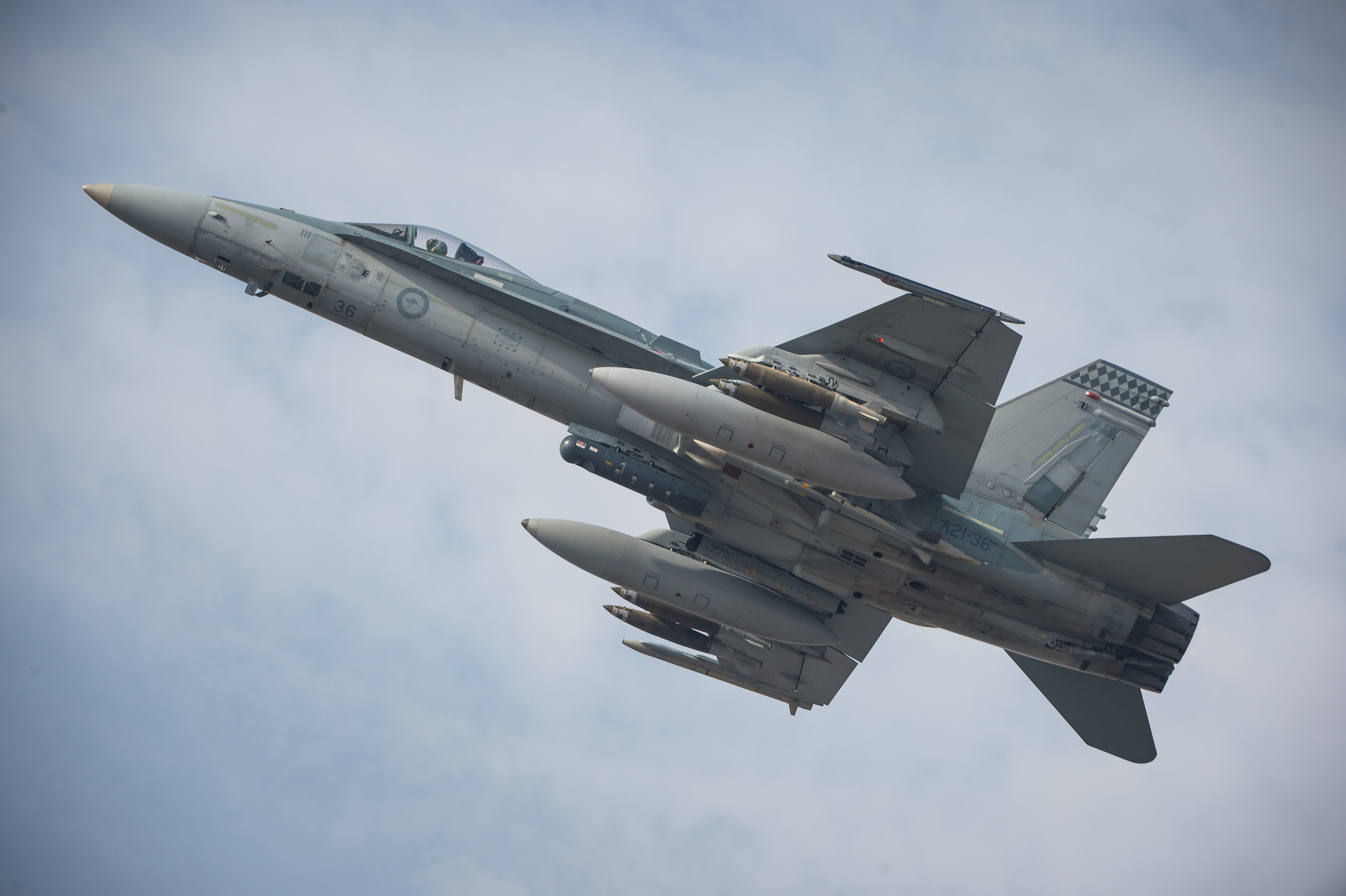
An RAAF F/A-18 Hornet taking off for a mission over Iraq in 2017.

In June 2014 a small number of SASR personnel were deployed to Iraq to protect the Australian embassy when the security of Baghdad was threatened by the 2014 Northern Iraq offensive. Later, in August and September a number of RAAF C-17 and C-130J transport aircraft based in the Middle East were used to conduct airdrops of humanitarian aid to trapped civilians and to airlift arms and munitions to forces in Kurdish-controlled northern Iraq. In late September 2014 an Air Task Group (ATG) and Special Operations Task Group (SOTG) were deployed to Al Minhad Air Base in the United Arab Emirates as part of the coalition to combat Islamic State forces in Iraq. Equipped with F/A-18F Super Hornet strike aircraft, a KC-30A Multi Role Tanker Transport, and an E-7A Wedgetail Airborne Early Warning & Control aircraft, the ATG began operations on 1 October. The SOTG is tasked with operations to advise and assist Iraqi Security Forces, and was deployed to Iraq after a legal framework covering their presence in the country was agreed between the Australian and Iraqi Governments. It began moving into Iraq in early November. In April 2015 a 300-strong unit known as Task Group Taji was deployed to Iraq to train the regular Iraqi Security Forces. In September 2015 airstrikes were extended to Syria. Strike missions concluded in December 2017.

== Peacekeeping and humanitarian relief operations ==
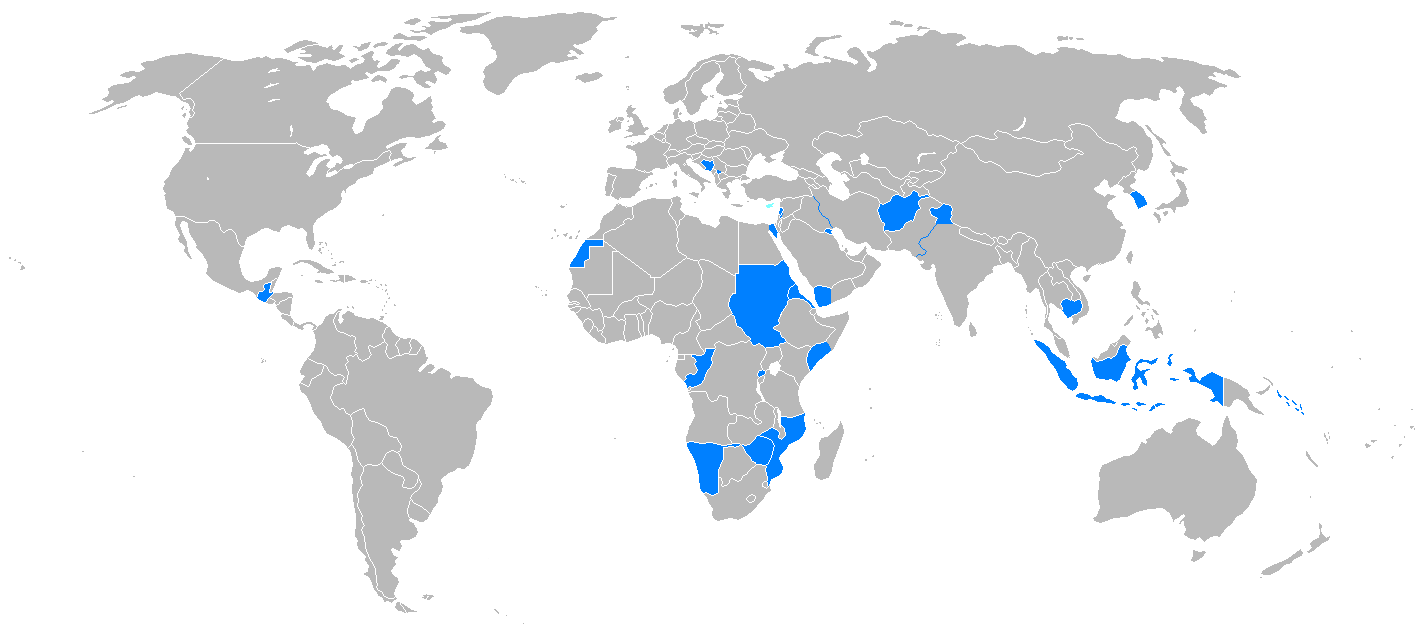
Australian peacekeeping deployments since 1945.

Australia's involvement in international peacekeeping operations has been diverse, and included participation in both United Nations sponsored missions, as well as those as part of ad hoc coalitions. Australians have been involved in more conflicts as peacekeepers than as belligerents; however "in comparative international terms, Australia has only been a moderately energetic peacekeeper." Although Australia has had peacekeepers in the field continuously for 60 years—being among the first group of UN military observers in Indonesia in 1947—its commitments have generally been limited, consisting mostly of small numbers of high-level and technical support troops such as signallers, engineers, medics, observers, and police. One significant commitment has been Australia's ongoing involvement with the long running Multinational Force and Observers in the Sinai. The operational tempo started increasing in the mid-1990s, when Australia became involved in a series of high-profile operations, deploying significantly larger combat units in support of a number of missions including Cambodia, Rwanda, Somalia, East Timor, and the Solomon Islands. Australia has been involved in close to 100 separate missions, involving more than 30,000 personnel; 14 Australians have died during these operations. In addition, approximately 7,000 personnel have been involved in 66 different overseas humanitarian relief operations between 1918 and 2006. Eleven personnel lost their lives during these missions.

== Military statistics ==
Conflict	Date	Number enlisted	Killed	Wounded	Prisoners of war	Notes
New Zealand	1860–1861	Crew of HMVS Victoria; 2,500 in Waikato Regiments	1 <20	Nil; Unknown	Nil	
Sudan	1885	770 in NSW Contingent	9	3	Nil	
South Africa	1899–1902	16,463 in Colonial and Commonwealth contingents	589	538	100	
China	1900–1901	560 in NSW, SA and VIC colonial naval contingents	6	Unknown	Nil	
First World War	1914–1918	416,809 enlisted in AIF (includes AFC); 324,000 AIF members served overseas 9,000 in RAN Total: 425,809	61,511	155,000	4,044 (397 died in captivity)	
Russian Civil War	1918–1919	100–150 in NREF and NRRF; 48 in Dunsterforce; Crew of HMAS Swan	10	40	Nil	
Second World War	1939–1945	727,200 in 2nd AIF and Militia; 48,900 in RAN; 216,900 in RAAF Total: 993,000	39,761	66,553	8,184 (against Germany and Italy); 22,376 (against Japan) (8,031 died in captivity) Total: 30,560	
Post-war mine clearance (Northern Queensland coast and New Guinea)	1947–1950		4			
Japan (British Commonwealth Occupation Force)	1947–1952	16,000	3			
Papua New Guinea	1947–1975		13			
Middle East (UNTSO)	1948–present		1			
Berlin Airlift	1948–1949		1			
Malayan Emergency	1948–1960	7,000 in Army	39	20	Nil	
Kashmir	1948–1985		1			
Korean War	1950–1953	10,657 in Army; 4,507 in RAN; 2,000 in RAAF Total: 17,164	340	1,216	29 (1 died in captivity)	
Malta	1952–1955		3			
Korea (Post-armistice)	1953–1957		16			
South-East Asia (SEATO)	1955–1975		6			
Indonesia-Malaysia Confrontation	1962–1966	3,500 in Army	16	9	Nil	
Malay Peninsula	1964–1966		2			
Vietnam War	1962–1973	42,700 in Army; 2,825 in RAN; 4,443 in RAAF Total: 49,968	521	2,398	Nil	
Thailand	1965–1968		2			
Irian Jaya (Operation Cenderawasih)	1976–1981		1			
Gulf War	1991	750	Nil	Nil	Nil	
Western Sahara (MINURSO)	1991–1994		1			
Somalia	1992–1994	1,480	1		Nil	
Bougainville	1997–2003	3,500	1			
East Timor	1999–2013	> 40,000	4		Nil	
Afghanistan	2001–2021	> 26,000	41	256	Nil	
Iraq	2003–2011	17,000	3	27	Nil	
Solomon Islands	2003–2013	7,270	1			
Fiji	2006		2			
Total			~ 102,930	~ 226,060	~ 34,733	
Note: In addition, approximately another 3,100 Australians died in various conflicts, serving in either British or other Commonwealth or Allied forces, or the Merchant Navy, or were civilians working with philanthropic organisations, official war correspondents, photographers, or artists.

== See also ==
- Peace movements in Australia

== Notes ==
Footnotes

Citations
