= 102nd Medium Battery, Royal Australian Artillery =

Artillery battery unit of the Australian Army

- Active: 1957–1987
- Country: Australia
- Branch: Australian Army
- Type: Artillery
- Engagements: Malayan Emergency; Indonesian Confrontation; Vietnam War

The 102nd Medium Battery was an artillery battery unit of the Royal Australian Artillery. The battery was formed in 1957, known as the 102nd Field Battery and served in the Indonesia–Malaysia confrontation and the Vietnam War before being disbanded in 1987.

== History ==
Formed in 1957 at Holsworthy Barracks, Sydney as the 102nd Field Battery as part of the 1st Field Regiment.

The battery served during the Indonesia–Malaysia confrontation between May and August 1965 and while in Malaysia the battery provided fire support during the Kesang River incursion by Indonesian forces. While serving in North Borneo, equipped with L5 Pack Howitzer, the battery provided defensive support to the 3rd Battalion, Royal Australian Regiment, Ghurkha, and British Regiments undertaking operations and also fire support for secret Claret operations in Indonesian territory.

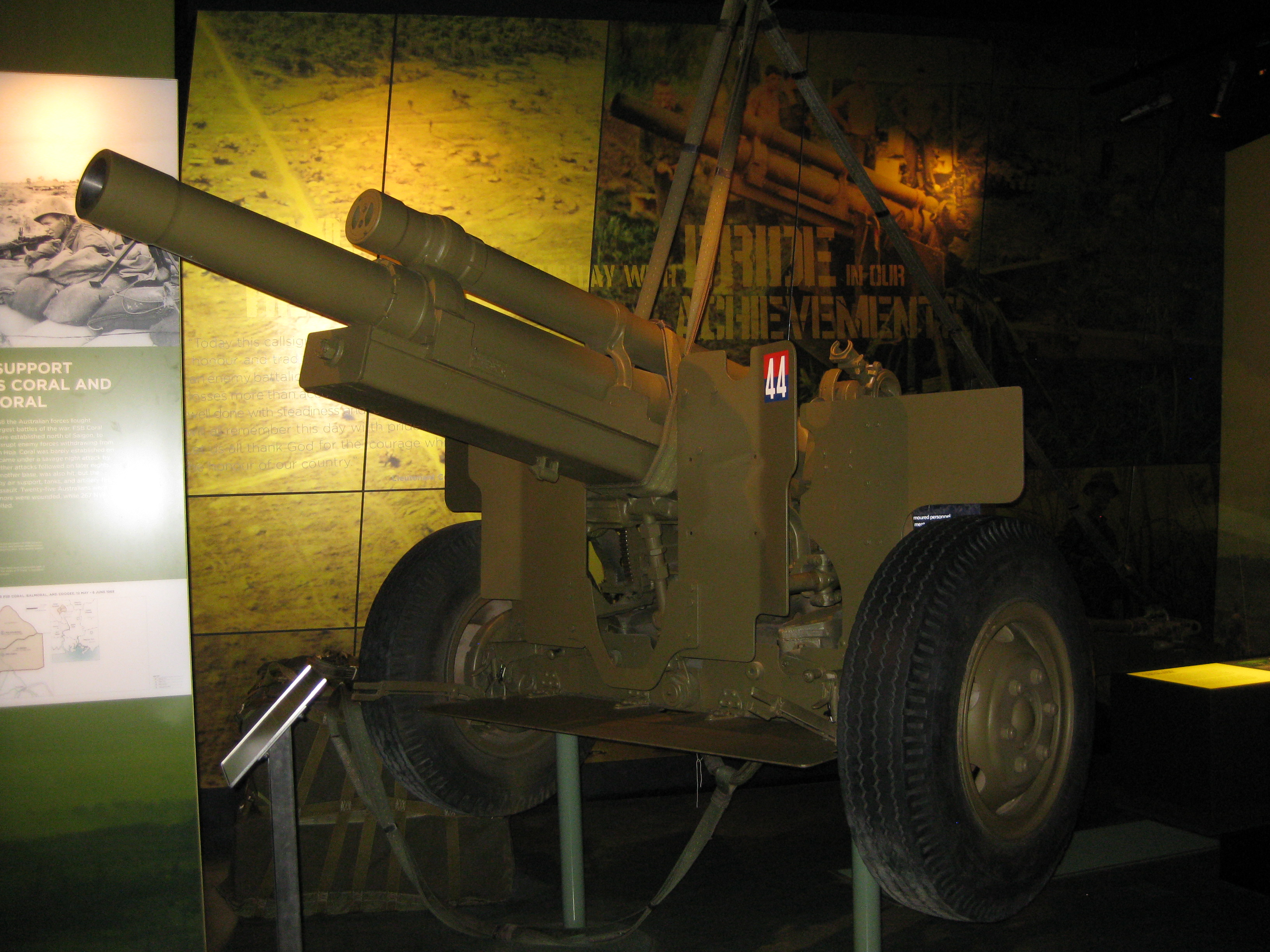
M2A2 howitzer captured by North Vietnamese on display at Australian War Memorial.

On 18 April 1966, the battery was transferred to the 12th Field Regiment with the 104th Field Battery. Arriving in Vietnam as part of Australia's commitment to the Vietnam War in March 1968, replacing the 106th Field Battery and was equipped with the 105mm M2A2 Howitzer. On the night of 12 May 1968, while at Fire Support Base Coral, a M2A2 howitzer was captured by North Vietnamese troops who temporarily overran part of the base, however the gun was recaptured shortly afterwards. (Note: The M2A2 howitzer captured by the North Vietnamese Army is on display at the Australian War Memorial, Canberra.) The 102nd Field Battery was replaced in February 1969, and returned to Australia. During its tour of duty the battery had been positioned at 30 different Fire Support Bases, fired 60,000 rounds and received the following decorations: 1 MM, 2 MID, 1 MBE and 1 BEM.

The battery became part of the 8th/12th Medium Regiment in November 1973 and in 1983 after being re-equipped with the M198 155mm howitzer was redesignated 102nd Medium Battery before being disbanded in 1987.

== Commanding officers ==
- Major G C Andrews

== Battle honours ==
- Vietnam War: Coral

102 Battery was awarded the Honour Title "Coral" in 1998 and is now designated as 102 (Coral) Battery.
