= 103rd Medium Battery, Royal Australian Artillery =

- Active: 1916–1919; 1920–1941; 1954–1957; 1960–present
- Country: Australia
- Branch: Army
- Type: Artillery
- Part of: 8th/12th Regiment, Royal Australian Artillery
- Garrison/HQ: Darwin, Northern Territory
- Engagements: World War I: Western Front; Malayan Emergency; Confrontation; Vietnam War: Battle of Long Tan

The 103rd Medium Battery is an artillery battery unit of the Royal Australian Artillery. The battery was formed in 1916, known as the 103rd Field (Howitzer) Battery and served during World War I. Its successors have fought in the Indonesia–Malaysia confrontation and the Vietnam War and the battery is currently part of the 8th/12th Regiment, Royal Australian Artillery, based in Darwin, Northern Territory, as part of the 1st Brigade.

== History ==
The battery was first formed at Tel-el-Kebir, in Egypt, on 6 March 1916 as the "103rd Field (Howitzer) Battery", as part of a reorganisation of the Australian Imperial Force (AIF) following the Gallipoli Campaign. At this time, the AIF was expanded from two divisions to five, with two fresh divisions being raised in Egypt and another in Australia. After a period of training it was planned to send the AIF to Europe to fight on the Western Front, and as a result, it was necessary to expand the AIF's artillery to include 4.5-inch howitzers as well as the 18-pounder field guns that had fought at Gallipoli. The previous organisation had seen Australia raise three field brigades as part of the 1st Division, but under the reorganisation each division would also receive a howitzer brigade. These were numbered consecutively, starting from the 101st, with the 103rd being assigned to the 12th Howitzer Brigade.

After their arrival in France in mid-1916, the artillery was reorganised again and the howitzer brigades were subsumed into the field brigades; consequently the 103rd became part of the 3rd Field Brigade in April, and were assigned to the 1st Division. They were initially equipped with four guns, but in January 1917 this was expanded to six. The battery was committed to the fighting a short time later, joining the 3rd Field Brigade's other units – the 7th and 8th Field Batteries – near the front line around Fleurbaix, about 4 miles (6.4 km) south-west of Armentieres, near the French–Belgian border. For the next two-and-a-half years they provided artillery support to the infantry fighting in the trenches along the front. Their time was punctuated by periods out of the line and further reorganisations such as the one that occurred in January 1917, when the 3rd Field Brigade was renamed the 3rd Field Artillery (Army) Brigade. After the armistice was signed in November 1918, the demobilisation process began and the battery's personnel were slowly repatriated to Australia. As its numbers dwindled, in February 1919, just before the unit's final cadre began their journey home, it was amalgamated with the 101st Howitzer Battery.

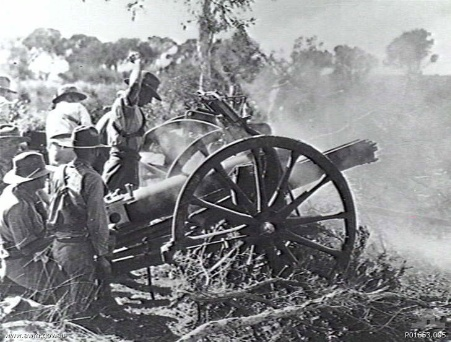
A 4.5-inch howitzer from the 3rd Field Brigade on exercise, 1935.

During the inter-war years, the battery was reformed twice as part of the Citizen Forces. Initially, it was reformed in 1920 in Sydney, but the following year Australia's part-time military was reorganised to perpetuate the numerical designations and formations of the AIF, and the unit was disbanded and re-formed in Western Australia as part of the newly re-raised 3rd Field Brigade, which was headquartered at Guildford, Western Australia. In doing so, it drew personnel from the previously existing 38th and 39th Field Batteries. Throughout the inter-war years, the battery remained in this form until after the start of World War II. As a Militia formation, the 103rd Battery could not be deployed overseas to fight after the outbreak of the war, and while some of its members volunteered for service with the Second Australian Imperial Force it remained in Australia. In 1941, Australia's artillery formations were reorganised along regimental lines, equipped with two field batteries. As a result, the 103rd was disbanded, with its howitzers being used to provide a troop of guns each to the newly raised 3rd Field Regiment's 7th and 8th Field Batteries.

The battery remained off the order of battle until the mid-1950s when a further reorganisation of the Royal Australian Artillery saw the raising of the battery as an Australian Regular Army anti-aircraft unit in 1954, based at Middle Head, New South Wales. The battery's existence was short-lived as it was disbanded again in 1957, when its personnel and guns were transferred to the 111th Light Anti-Aircraft Battery. In 1960, after the Australian Army adopted the Pentropic divisional structure, the battery was re-formed within the 4th Field Regiment, Royal Australian Artillery, based at Wacol, Queensland. The following year, the battery was deployed to Camp Terendak in Malaya as part of Australia's involvement in the Malayan Emergency and then later the Confrontation with Indonesia. There it was detached to the command of the British 26th Field Regiment, and operated the 105-mm guns previously controlled by the 101st Field Battery. It remained deployed until October 1963 and upon its return to Australia was relocated to Holsworthy, New South Wales, where it became part of the 1st Field Regiment, Royal Australian Artillery.

In May 1966, after period of intense training the battery was deployed to South Vietnam as part of the 1st Australian Task Force, which had been deployed as part of Australia's commitment to the Vietnam War. There, it joined one of the 1st Field Regiment's other subunits, the 105th Field Battery, and the New Zealand 161st Field Battery on the gun line at the Australian base at Nui Dat. During their year-long deployment, the battery fired a total of 28,468 rounds, with its most significant action coming on 18 August 1966, when it supported D Company, 6 RAR during the Battle of Long Tan. It also provided support to Operation Robin, a route clearance tasking, in October 1966, during which it supported both 5 RAR and 6 RAR. During its 12-month tour of Vietnam, the battery lost six men wounded.

The battery returned to Australia in May 1967, at which point it became an independent unit based at Holsworthy, supporting the School of Artillery and undertaking ceremonial duties. In April 1968, the battery became part of the 19th Composite Regiment, which became the 8th Medium Regiment in August 1969. A further reorganisation occurred in November 1973, when the 8th Medium Regiment was amalgamated with the 12th to form the 8th/12th Medium Regiment. Since then, the battery has remained a part of this regiment, which was later renamed the 8th/12th Regiment. Since the mid-1970s, the battery has operated a variety of guns, including 5.5-inch howitzers and 105-mm field pieces. Up until 1998, the battery continued its support role to the School of Artillery, but this ended when the school relocated to Puckapunyal, Victoria. In 1999, elements of the battery deployed to East Timor as part of INTERFET and then UNTAET. On their return in mid-2000, the battery, along with the rest of the 8th/12th Medium Regiment relocated to Darwin, Northern Territory, where it became part of the 1st Brigade. The battery continues to form part of this formation, and since its move as deployed personnel to East Timor, Rifle Company Butterworth, the Solomon Islands, Iraq and Afghanistan and currently operates 155-mm M777A2 howitzers.
