= Battle of Coral–Balmoral =

Part of the Vietnam War (1968)

- Part of the Vietnam War
- Australian soldiers defending FSB Coral, May 1968
| Date | 12 May – 6 June 1968 |
| Location | North of Tân Uyên, Bình Dương Province, South Vietnam 11.08°N 106.79°E |
| Result | Australian victory |

Belligerents
| Australia; New Zealand; United States | North Vietnam; Viet Cong |

Commanders and leaders
| (Australia) Ron Hughes; (Australia) Donald Dunstan; (Australia) Jim Shelton; (Australia) Phillip Bennett | Nguyen The Bon; Phan Viet Dong |

Units involved
| 1st Aust Task Force: 1 RAR; 3 RAR; A Sqn, 3rd Cavalry Regt; C Sqn, 1st Armd Regt; 12th Field Regt, RAA; 161 Bty RNZA | 7th Division: 141st Regt; 165th Regt |

Strength
| ~2,500 to 3,000 personnel | ~3,000 to 4,000 personnel |

Casualties and losses
| (Australia) 25 killed | Australian claim: 267–327 killed 11 captured |

The Battle of Coral–Balmoral (12 May – 6 June 1968) was a series of actions fought during the Vietnam War between the 1st Australian Task Force (1 ATF) and the North Vietnamese People's Army of Vietnam (PAVN) 7th Division and Viet Cong (VC) Main Force units, 40 kilometres (25 mi) north-east of Saigon. Following the defeat of the PAVN/VC Tet Offensive in January and February, in late April two Australian infantry battalions—the 1st and 3rd Battalions of the Royal Australian Regiment (RAR)—with supporting arms, were again deployed from their base at Nui Dat in Phước Tuy Province to positions astride infiltration routes leading to Saigon to interdict renewed movement against the capital. Part of the wider allied Operation Toan Thang I, it was launched in response to intelligence reports of another impending PAVN/VC offensive, yet the Australians experienced little fighting during this period. Meanwhile, the PAVN/VC successfully penetrated the capital on 5 May, plunging Saigon into chaos during the May Offensive in an attempt to influence the upcoming Paris peace talks scheduled to begin on the 13th. During three days of intense fighting the attacks were repelled by US and South Vietnamese forces, and although another attack was launched by the PAVN/VC several days later, the offensive was again defeated with significant losses on both sides, causing extensive damage to Saigon and many civilian casualties. By 12 May the fighting was over, and the PAVN/VC were forced to withdraw having suffered heavy casualties. US casualties were also heavy and it proved to be their most costly week of the war.

1 ATF was redeployed on 12 May to obstruct the withdrawal of forces from the capital, with two battalions establishing a fire support base named FSB Coral, just east of Lai Khê in Bình Dương Province, in an area of operations known as AO Surfers. However, poor reconnaissance and inadequate operational planning led to delays and confusion during the fly-in, and the Australians had only partially completed FSB Coral by the evening. The PAVN mounted battalion-sized assaults on the night of 12/13 May, with a heavy bombardment from 03:30 signalling the start. Exploiting the disorganised defence to penetrate the Australian perimeter, the PAVN 141st Regiment temporarily captured a forward gun position during close-quarters fighting, before being repulsed by superior firepower that morning. Casualties were heavy on both sides, but the Australians had won a convincing victory. The following day 1 RAR was deployed to defend FSB Coral, while 3 RAR established FSB Coogee to the west to ambush staging areas and infiltration routes. Coral was again assaulted in the early hours of 16 May, coming under a heavy barrage followed by another regimental-sized attack. Again the base was penetrated, but after a six-hour battle the PAVN were forced to withdraw after suffering heavy losses. Expecting further fighting, the Australians were subsequently reinforced with Centurion tanks and additional artillery. On 22 May, FSB Coral was again attacked overnight, coming under a short but accurate mortar bombardment which was broken up by Australian artillery and mortars.

The Australians then moved against the PAVN/VC base areas east of Route 16, with 3 RAR redeploying to establish FSB Balmoral on 24 May, 4.5 kilometres (2.8 mi) to the north. Now supported by tanks which had arrived from Coral just hours before, the infantry at Balmoral were subjected to a two-battalion attack by the PAVN 165th Regiment. Following a rocket and mortar barrage at 03:45 on 26 May, the attack fell primarily on D Company before being repelled with heavy casualties by the combined firepower of the tanks and infantry. The next day the Australians at Coral assaulted bunkers that had been located just outside the base, with a troop of Centurions supported by infantry destroying the bunkers and their occupants without loss to themselves. A second major PAVN attack, again of regimental strength, was made against Balmoral at 02:30 on 28 May but was called off after 30 minutes after being soundly defeated by the supporting fire of the tanks, artillery and mortars. Regardless, the battle continued into June as the Australians patrolled their area of operations. However, with contacts decreasing, 1 ATF returned to Nui Dat on 6 June, being relieved by US and South Vietnamese forces. The battle was the first time the Australians had clashed with regular PAVN units operating in regimental strength in conventional warfare. During 26 days of fighting the PAVN/VC sustained heavy losses and were forced to postpone a further attack on Saigon, while 1 ATF also suffered significant casualties. The largest unit-level action of the war for the Australians, today the battle is considered one of the most famous actions fought by the Australian Army during the Vietnam War.

== Background ==
=== Military situation ===
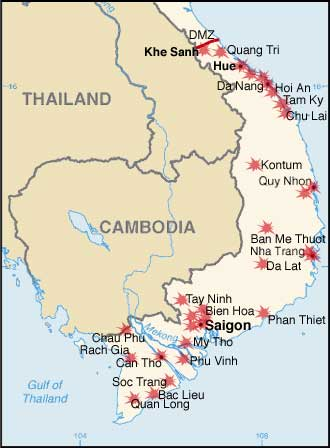
South Vietnamese population centres and installations targeted by the Viet Cong during the 1968 Tet Offensive

Based in Nui Dat in Phước Tuy Province, the 1st Australian Task Force (1 ATF) was part of US II Field Force, Vietnam (IIFFV), under the overall command of Lieutenant General Frederick Weyand. By early 1968, 1 ATF had been reinforced and was at full strength with three infantry battalions supported by armour, artillery, aviation and engineers, while logistic arrangements were provided by the 1st Australian Logistic Support Group (1 ALSG) based at the port of Vũng Tàu. Commanded by Brigadier Ron Hughes, 1 ATF had continued to operate independently within Phước Tuy, and while the war had become a series of large-scale search-and-destroy operations in a war of attrition for the Americans, the Australians had largely pursued their own counter-insurgency campaign despite the differences between Australian and American methods at times producing friction between the allies. Regardless, 1 ATF was also available for deployment elsewhere in the III Corps Tactical Zone and with the province coming progressively under control throughout 1967, the Australians would increasingly spend a significant period of time conducting operations further afield.

The Tet Offensive began on 31 January 1968, with 85,000 to 100,000 PAVN/VC troops simultaneously assaulting population centres and allied installations across South Vietnam in an attempt to incite a general uprising against the South Vietnamese government and its American supporters. In response, 1 ATF was deployed along likely infiltration routes in order to defend the vital Biên Hòa–Long Binh complex near Saigon between January and March, as part of Operation Coburg. Heavy fighting resulted in 17 Australians killed and 61 wounded, while PAVN/VC casualties included at least 145 killed, 110 wounded and five captured, with many more removed from the battlefield. Meanwhile, the remaining Australian forces in Phước Tuy were stretched thin, with elements of 3 RAR successfully repelling an assault on Bà Rịa and later spoiling a harassing attack on Long Điền and conducting a sweep of Hỏa Lòng, killing 50 VC and wounding 25 for the loss of five killed and 24 wounded.

At the strategic level the general uprising never eventuated, and in late-February the PAVN/VC offensive collapsed after suffering more than 45,000 killed, against South Vietnamese and allied losses of 6,000 men. Regardless, it proved to be a turning point in the war and although it had been a tactical disaster for the PAVN/VC, Hanoi emerged with a significant political victory as confidence in the American military and political leadership collapsed, as did public support for the war in the United States. Prior to Tet, American commanders and politicians had talked confidently about winning the war, arguing that General William Westmoreland's strategy of attrition had reached the point where the PAVN/VC were losing soldiers and equipment faster than they could be replaced. Yet the scale of the offensive, and the surprise and violence with which it had been launched, had shocked the American public and contradicted such predictions of imminent victory; in its wake President Lyndon Johnson announced that he would no longer seek a second term in office. Tet had a similar effect on Australian public opinion, and caused growing uncertainty in the government about the determination of the United States to remain militarily involved in Southeast Asia. Amid the initial shock, Prime Minister John Gorton unexpectedly declared that Australia would not increase its military commitment in South Vietnam beyond the current level of 8,000 personnel.

On the ground, the war continued without respite and Hughes—the 1 ATF commander—turned his attention to the VC D445 Provincial Mobile Battalion, deciding to strike at its base areas in the Minh Dam Secret Zone located in the Long Hải Hills south of Long Điền and Đất Đỏ, 14 kilometres (8.7 mi) from Nui Dat. The 5th Battalion, Royal Australian Regiment (5 RAR) had suffered heavy casualties in February 1967 while operating in the Long Hảis, which were heavily defended by mines and booby traps; despite previous operations by the US 173rd Airborne Brigade in June 1966 and two smaller South Vietnamese operations, the area had remained a VC safe haven. However, this time the Australians would use two battalions supported by tanks and air strikes in an attempt to reduce the base area. Operation Pinnaroo began on 27 February, with 2 RAR and 3 RAR cordoning off the complex with the rifle companies patrolling and ambushing at night in order to prevent the VC from escaping. On 8 March the Australians conducted a wide encircling movement to tighten the cordon, while a sustained bombardment by US B-52 heavy bombers and artillery targeted the hill the next day. A combined force of infantry from 3 RAR supported by armour then advanced on the foothills, before clearing the minefields and destroying an extensive base area which included a deep cave system that had first been used by the Việt Minh against the French in the 1950s. Each Australian rifle company then methodically searched its area of operations, while engineers destroyed the underground facilities; a task which required the use of tonnes of explosives.

D Company, 3 RAR with tanks and APCs at the foot of the Long Hai hills.

The operation lasted until 15 April, with mines—including many M16s that had been lifted by the VC from the controversial barrier minefield laid by the Australians at Đất Đỏ—once again claiming a significant toll. Ten Australians were killed and another 36 were wounded, while known VC casualties included 21 killed, 14 wounded and 40 captured. Fifty-seven camps and bunker systems were also destroyed, as were large quantities of weapons, munitions and supplies. Judged a success by the Australians despite their heavy losses, the operation had resulted in significant disruption to the VC and hindered their operations for some time. Regardless, with 1 ATF lacking the manpower to hold the area, the failure of South Vietnamese forces to permanently occupy the Long Hais meant that any gains were only fleeting, and the D445 Battalion headquarters soon returned to the area after ejecting a South Vietnamese regional force company a few months later. Meanwhile, 7 RAR had finished its last operation in March and was relieved by 1 RAR on 9 April, returning to Australia having completed its twelve-month tour.

== Prelude ==
=== Planning and preliminary operations ===
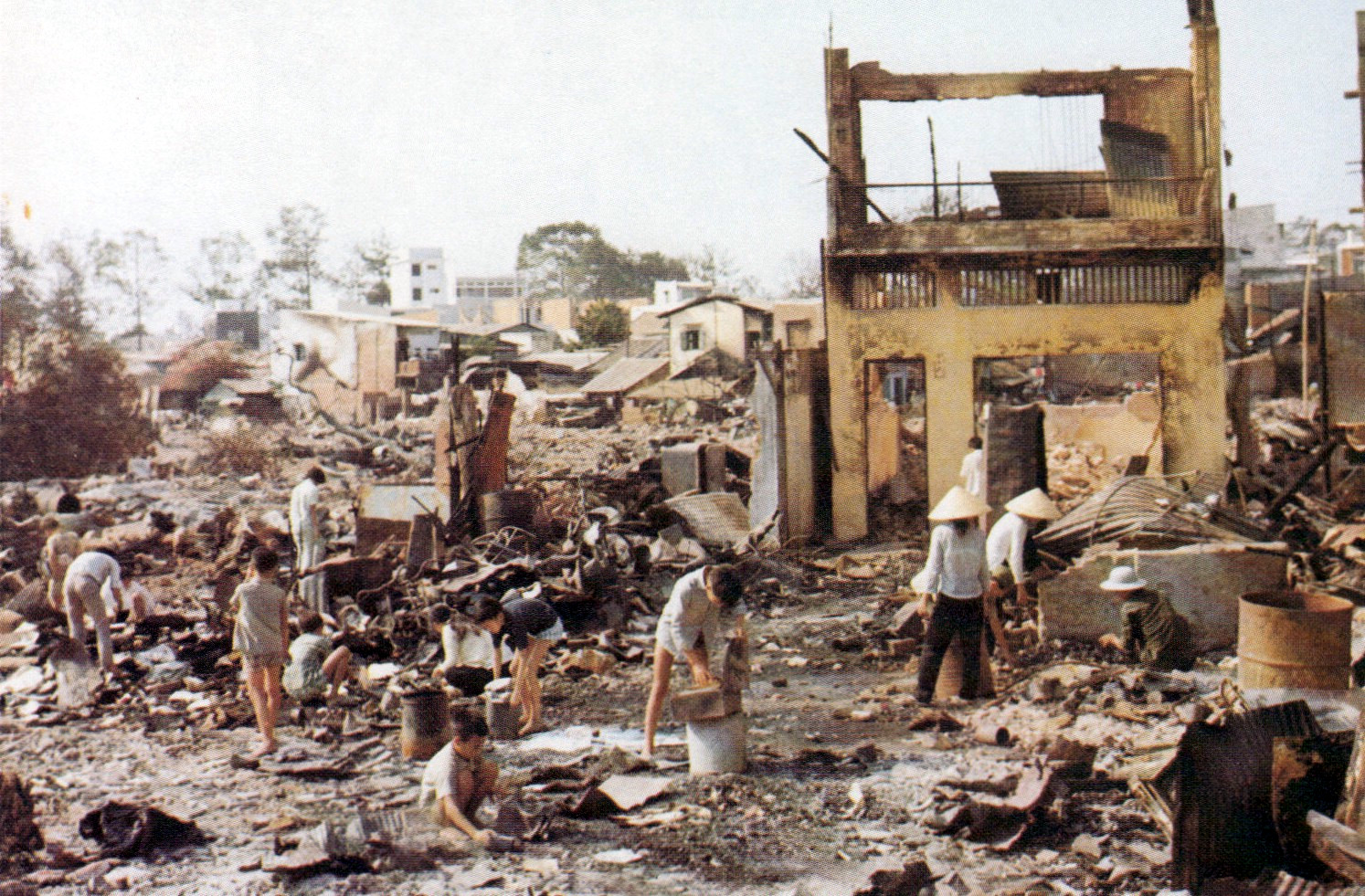
South Vietnamese civilians sort through the ruins of their homes in Cholon, the heavily damaged Chinese section of Saigon following the Tet Offensive.

Despite their losses during the previous fighting, the PAVN/VC appeared to have gained the initiative. Although the Tet Offensive had devastated the VC, costing them about half their strength in the south, the Defense Minister of the Democratic Republic of Vietnam—General Võ Nguyên Giáp—had moved quickly to replace these losses with reinforcements, and by early May 15,000 PAVN soldiers were serving in VC units in South Vietnam. On 8 April, Westmoreland launched a series of large-scale sweeps involving over 70,000 South Vietnamese, American, Australian, New Zealand and Thai troops, code-named Operation Toan Thang I. Meanwhile, on 5 May the PAVN/VC launched attacks against 119 provincial and district capitals, military installations and major cities during the May Offensive in an attempt to gain an advantage at the first session of peace negotiations scheduled to begin in Paris on the 13th. Saigon was successfully infiltrated in an event that received widespread international media coverage and resulted in considerable embarrassment for the Americans and their allies, with as many as five of the 13 attacking VC battalions penetrating the city's outer defences, plunging the capital into chaos and resulting in heavy civilian casualties. After three days of intense fighting American and South Vietnamese forces successfully repelled the assault while, as the peace talks neared, a fresh wave of attacks was launched on Saigon several days later. However, by 12 May the fighting was over, and the VC were forced to withdraw having suffered more than 5,500 dead in just over one week of fighting. US casualties were also heavy, amounting to 652 killed and 2,225 wounded, which made it the most costly week of the war for the Americans.

The Australians were initially employed on operations inside Phước Tuy Province during Operation Toan Thang I. VC activity in their traditional base areas in the Hat Dich north of Nui Thi Vai hills, had been increasing in February and March and 3 RAR subsequently commenced operations along the north-western border of Phước Tuy Province on 21 April. These operations resulted in little contact. In light of this, the Commander Australian Forces Vietnam—Major General Arthur MacDonald—believed that the task force would be better employed against PAVN forces, rather than in local pacification operations; later, following a request from Weyand, 1 ATF would again redeploy outside the province. As such, in an operation similar to those three months earlier at Biên Hòa, it was planned that 1 ATF would be used to help block infiltration towards Saigon. Overall responsibility for the defence of the capital was assigned to US IIFFV, and included the US 1st, 9th, and 25th Division, as well as the US 199th Light Infantry Brigade, 1 ATF, and several South Vietnamese units. The main deployment began on 25 April in response to intelligence reports of another impending offensive, with 1 ATF headquarters established at the US Bearcat Base, while 2 RAR and 3 RAR deployed to the Biên Hòa–Long Khánh border to block likely infiltration routes east of the large American base complex at Long Binh, which included Biên Hòa Air Base and the large Long Binh Logistics Depot. Meanwhile, the task force base at Nui Dat was defended by one infantry battalion, a squadron of tanks and the remainder of the cavalry. The SAS squadron also remained in Phước Tuy during this period, continuing reconnaissance and surveillance operations in the province.

2 RAR was tasked with patrolling and ambushing tracks and likely rocket-launching sites to disrupt the expected attack against Saigon. The battalion established FSB Hunt, and conducted some small but successful ambushes. Meanwhile, 3 RAR established FSB Evans and conducted search-and-ambush operations before returning to Nui Dat on 3 May after being replaced by 1 RAR, which then joined 2 RAR for a sweep. In response to the attacks on Saigon, elements of 1 ATF redeployed on 5 May, relieving the US 199th Light Infantry Brigade in an area of operations (AO) known as AO Columbus so that it could be released for operations elsewhere, with companies from both battalions deploying to ambush suspected infiltration routes in the expectation of an attack by the 274th Regiment from the VC 5th Division. Five days later 2 RAR was relieved by 3 RAR, having completed its last major operation before returning to Australia. The Australians waited for the VC to make their move, but they again proved elusive and contact was only light, and by 10 May just six had been killed and one wounded after 21 days of operations. Having missed the PAVN/VC units as they infiltrated the capital, it was planned that the Australians would be again redeployed on 12 May in order to obstruct the withdrawal of these forces following their defeat in Saigon. The task force would subsequently concentrate astride Route 16 on one of the major north–south supply routes 40 kilometres (25 mi) north-east of Saigon, just east of Lai Khe in Bình Dương Province, in a new area of operations known as AO Surfers. Meanwhile, US forces would operate in support on the flanks.

=== Opposing forces ===
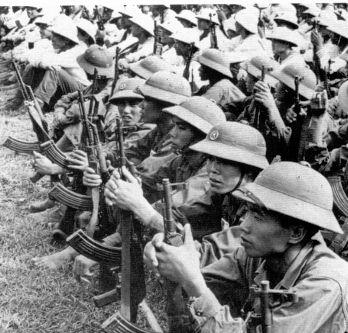
PAVN troops during the war

1 ATF would move with its headquarters and two infantry battalions—1 RAR and 3 RAR—as well as cavalry, artillery, engineer, and aviation elements operating in support, including M113 armoured personnel carriers from A Squadron, 3rd Cavalry Regiment, 105 mm M2A2 howitzers from 12th Field Regiment, Royal Australian Artillery, Bell H-13 Sioux light observation helicopters from 161st Reconnaissance Flight and mortar locating radars from 131st Divisional Locating Battery. The concept of operations called for the establishment battalion AOs, named Bondi, Manly and Newport. 1 RAR was allocated to AO Bondi with artillery support from the 102nd Field Battery established at a fire support base, named FSB Coral. 3 RAR was initially allocated to AO Manly, west of Bondi, and would also be supported from FSB Coral by its own supporting battery, 161st Battery, Royal New Zealand Artillery. The operation would be conducted in three phases. 3 RAR—under the command of Lieutenant Colonel Jim Shelton—would conduct an air assault into Coral early on 12 May, with the lead elements securing the landing zone for the fly-in of the remainder of the battalion, and 1 RAR under Lieutenant Colonel Phillip Bennett. Leaving its supporting artillery and one infantry company for protection, 3 RAR would then move west to establish blocking positions and patrol AO Manly in order to intercept PAVN/VC forces attempting to withdraw from the south and south-west. Meanwhile, 1 RAR would establish its supporting artillery and mortars at FSB Coral, and then with one company, clear Route 16 to the village of Tan Uyen, 7 kilometres (4.3 mi) to the south. The battalion would then occupy blocking positions and patrol AO Bondi. 1 ATF headquarters would then move from Bearcat to FSB Coral on 13 May, while the forward task force maintenance area would move from Bearcat by road convoy and be operational by 14 May.

Several PAVN units had been identified in AO Surfers, including the regular PAVN 7th Division—consisting of the PAVN 141st and 165th Regiments under the command of Nguyen the Bon, the VC 5th Division—consisting of VC 274th and 275th Regiments, and the Đồng Nai Regiment. These divisions were believed to have participated in the assault on Saigon and allied intelligence considered it likely they would attempt to withdraw through the Australian area of operations in order to regroup. Other forces included the PAVN 85th Regiment as well as the 165th, 233rd, 269th, 275th, D280 and 745th VC Infiltration Groups and various units used for reconnaissance, guiding, logistics, liaison and other tasks. In total, an estimated strength of 3,000 to 4,000 men. Regardless, despite earlier warnings that they may concentrate up to regimental-strength, a breakdown in the passage of intelligence led the Australians to believe that the PAVN/VC would remain dispersed in small groups in an attempt to avoid detection. As such the Australians assumed that the PAVN/VC forces would pose little threat and envisioned patrolling from company harbours to find and ambush them as they withdrew. Meanwhile, due to the risk of heavy ground fire, only a very limited aerial reconnaissance of the new area of operations was undertaken and this later had significant implications.

== Battle ==
=== Occupation of FSB Coral, 12 May 1968 ===
On the night of 11/12 May, only a few hours before the Australian redeployment was scheduled to commence, forces from US 1st Division operating in AO Surfers were attacked just west of the proposed landing zone (LZ). Continuing through the night and into the following morning, the fighting prevented the Americans from leaving the area and led to initial delays in occupying FSB Coral. Further delays arose after the terrain around the proposed LZ was found to be unsuitable for helicopters, and Shelton was forced to designate a new location 1,000 metres (1,100 yd) to the south-west for his battalion. Meanwhile, the American company providing security for the lead Australian elements had to redeploy to secure the new LZ. Communications were problematic throughout the operation and this further compounded the delays. The first infantry company to fly in—B Company, 3 RAR under the command of Major Bert Irwin—was already airborne and Shelton directed them to the new LZ. On landing, Irwin moved quickly to the original position, and despite rapidly clearing it, the insertion was further delayed.

A US Army CH-47 Chinook at FSB Coral, 12 May 1968

1 ATF was not well practised in flying in and setting up a large fire support base, and a poorly co-ordinated, prolonged and dislocated operation caused considerable delay in getting on the ground, and the scattering of some units. Confusion continued to affect the operation, with 161st Battery, RNZA arriving by CH-47 Chinook before FSB Coral was ready, and being forced to land in an improvised LZ in a clearing 1,000 metres (1,100 yd) to the south-west. Meanwhile, the continued presence of American forces in AO Manly also prevented 3 RAR from deploying as planned, and as the battalion began landing it was forced to remain on the western side of the FSB. 102nd Field Battery, the direct support battery for 1 RAR, was subsequently landed at FSB Coral and Major Brian Murtagh, second-in-command of 12th Field Regiment and the artillery tactical headquarters, was subsequently designated as the FSB commander, even though his guns were now physically dislocated from each other.

These delays in turn affected the fly-in of 1 RAR, with the companies forced to wait at the departure point in AO Columbus before they commenced the air move to FSB Coral. Hughes visited Bennett at FSB Coral at 15:30 to discuss aspects of the defence, as well as events planned for the following day. The deployment of the second battalion was not complete until 16:10, with the 1 RAR Mortar Platoon arriving on the last flight, more than four hours late. It became clear to Bennett that 1 RAR would need to deploy to the east of the FSB, and with just two hours before last light the companies were moved into hasty defensive positions, the last of which were not established until 17:00. Due to the hurried deployment, by dusk the two battalions of 1 ATF and their supporting elements were scattered around FSB Coral in four roughly connected groups, rather than in a co-ordinated defensive position. The task force headquarters advance party and part of its Defence Platoon were located centrally, yet the task force tactical headquarters and the artillery tactical headquarters under Lieutenant Colonel Jack Kelly—Commanding Officer of 12th Field Regiment—both remained in Bearcat. Hughes was not present either, having left Bearcat to attend to matters at the task force rear headquarters at Nui Dat, and was due to move forward with the tactical headquarters to FSB Coral the following day.

There had been little opportunity for co-ordination, with the Australian infantry strung out along the routes away from FSB Coral in preparation for their move the next day. 3 RAR was responsible for the security of FSB Coral, with D Company defending the north-west approaches, while the remaining three companies were dispersed over 3 kilometres (1.9 mi) to the west, spread between the FSB and the 161st Battery, RNZA gun positions to the south-west. 1 RAR occupied the eastern approaches, with its rifle companies dispersed over 5 kilometres (3.1 mi) harbouring in night ambush positions, while C Company was isolated to the south-east picketing the road to Tan Uyen in order to provide security for the convoy due to arrive from Bearcat the following day. Bennett kept his anti-tank and assault pioneer platoons inside the FSB to protect the battalion command post, while the mortar platoon would be particularly exposed, being located adjacent to the 102nd Field Battery gun position in an open area on the outer edge of the base facing to the north and east. The rifle companies to the north-east provided the only protection, yet there were large gaps between these positions and they could be easily bypassed. Although the Australians made further efforts to co-ordinate their defences prior to last light, attempting to tie in their positions to achieve mutual support between the sub-units, these arrangements remained incomplete as night fell.

FSB Coral from the air

Command posts were dug in and weapons pits and shell scrapes were commenced, yet many were not completed to any depth due to a lack of time, while a heavy rainfall started at 18:00 and soon filled the pits with water anyway. No claymore mines or barbed wire were laid out either, as the wire had not yet arrived, while lack of materials also prevented the construction of overhead protection. M60 machine-guns were placed out around the perimeter, but there was no time to test fire them or to properly tie in their arcs of fire. Meanwhile, 90 mm M67 recoilless rifles (RCLs) from the 1 RAR Anti-Tank Platoon armed with high-explosive anti-tank (HEAT) and anti-personnel flechette ammunition were sited to support the forward machine-guns. Due to their prior experiences fighting the VC in Phước Tuy Province, the Australians were not overly alarmed despite the defences at FSB Coral suffering due to the hasty deployment and, although the recent fighting involving the US 1st Division only 3 kilometres (1.9 mi) to the west may have been added cause for concern, its extent was unknown to the Australians at the time. (Note: Later it became known that forces identified during this fighting included part of the PAVN 141st Regiment and resulted in PAVN casualties of 36 killed and three captured.) Expecting the PAVN/VC to be operating in small groups while trying to avoid battle as they had done during the last three weeks, there was little thought of a major threat to the FSB. Commencing night routine, sentries were posted while the rest of the Australians stood down to get some sleep.

=== First attack on FSB Coral, 12/13 May 1968 ===
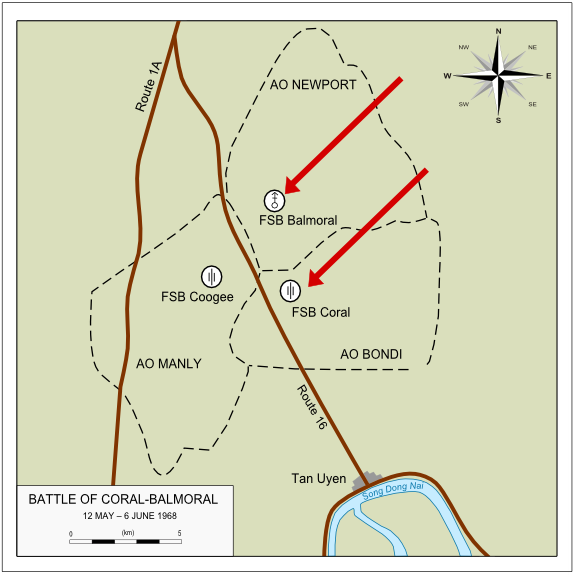
Battle of Coral–Balmoral, 12 May – 6 June 1968

Unknown to 1 ATF, the headquarters of the PAVN 7th Division was located approximately 9 kilometres (5.6 mi) to the east of FSB Coral and several units of the division were also based in the vicinity. The PAVN 165th Regiment was operating to the north and the 141st Regiment to the east, while the battalion-strength 275th Infiltration Group had only recently arrived, having left the Ho Chi Minh Trail on the Cambodian border just 48 hours earlier. The PAVN divisional commander had quickly dispatched reconnaissance elements to observe the fly-in of the Australians and their defensive preparations during the afternoon, and they soon reported the opportunity to attack the exposed gun positions of the 102nd Field Battery. One battalion of 141st Regiment, augmented by the 275th and 269th Infiltration Groups, was subsequently tasked to attack FSB Coral that night. This reconnaissance had not gone unnoticed by the Australian infantry, however, and companies from both 1 RAR and 3 RAR had fleeting contacts with small groups of PAVN at last light and into the evening. D Company, 1 RAR—under Major Tony Hammett—contacted a ten-man PAVN group while moving into ambush positions 2,500 metres (2,700 yd) north of FSB Coral late in the afternoon. In a brief exchange the PAVN broke contact after losing one killed, firing Rocket-propelled grenades (RPGs) into the trees above the Australians and wounding one of them.

During the evening B Company, 1 RAR—under the command of Major Bob Hennessy—had a further contact to the east with another ten-man group. Later, Major Colin Adamson's A Company detected 20 PAVN moving on the perimeter utilising newly issued Starlight scopes and subsequently killed and wounded some of them. However, such events appeared to be chance encounters and caused the Australians no particular concern. By midnight the rain had stopped, and five minutes later the 1 RAR mortar position was probed and a fire-fight ensued, resulting in possibly three PAVN killed. Later it became apparent that they had been marking assault lanes, while at 02:25 three PAVN from a forward reconnaissance party walked into a D Company, 1 RAR ambush and in the ensuing contact one was killed before they again broke contact, firing RPGs that killed one Australian and wounded 11 from a single platoon. Yet despite minor clashes the PAVN successfully bypassed the Australian rifle companies, conducting a forced march under cover of darkness and rain to dig in within 250 metres (270 yd) of FSB Coral undetected.

Finally at 03:30, rocket and mortar fire began falling on FSB Coral, concentrating on the 102nd Field Battery and the 1 RAR Mortar Platoon positions in an intense bombardment lasting five minutes. Following a ten-minute pause, flares signalled the start of the assault. Intending to capture the field guns, two PAVN companies rushed the Australians from the north-east firing their AK-47 assault rifles, with the 1 RAR Mortar Platoon taking the brunt of the initial attack, while the 1 ATF Defence Platoon was also pinned down by heavy machine-gun fire. The New Zealand howitzers and 3 RAR mortars began firing in support, however they failed to halt the PAVN and the initial assault succeeded in over-running the 1 RAR mortars, killing five and wounding eight. The flank of the main assault force then ran through the position at speed before moving on towards the gun position. During their earlier reconnaissance, the PAVN had likely observed the guns to be laid facing east and had probably planned to assault from the north as a result, yet shortly before the main attack the battery had fired a mission to the north and the guns were now directly facing their axis of assault. Moving in long straight lines across a frontage of 150 to 200 men, the main PAVN assault moved against the gun position as the Australian gunners opened fire over open sights with flechette rounds at point blank range, with thousands of darts ripping through their ranks and breaking up successive waves into small groups. Amid the confusion, follow-up sections hesitated upon reaching the mortar position, while other groups skirmished around the flanks and between the artillery and mortars.

Meanwhile, the 1 RAR Anti-Tank Platoon—commanded by Lieutenant Les Tranter—also engaged with flechettes from their 90 mm RCLs, firing across the front of the mortars and relieving the immediate pressure on them. However, with the PAVN having successfully achieved a break-in, and faced with the possibility of imminent annihilation, the 1 RAR Mortar Platoon second-in-command—Lieutenant Tony Jensen—was forced to direct the RCLs onto his own position, to which Bennett agreed. As the PAVN attempted to turn the captured mortars against the Australians, the flechette darts swept the area, clearing everything above ground, causing heavy casualties among the assaulting force and damaging several mortar tubes. Elsewhere, the PAVN assault had reached the Australian gun position, over-running two guns as desperate close quarters fighting broke out between the emplacements. The attackers subsequently succeeded in capturing No. 6 gun on the extreme edge of the gun-line and then attempted to destroy it with satchel charges. In both the mortar and artillery positions the PAVN and Australians occupied adjacent pits, fighting each other at close range for their possession. The gun position officer—Captain Ian Ahearn—co-ordinated the defence, and the Australians finally drove off the assault with grenades and small arms, as well as flechette rounds fired from the Anti-Tank Platoon. Meanwhile, with the assault falling mainly on 1 RAR and 102nd Field Battery, to the west 3 RAR had largely remained out of contact.

Although the PAVN troops were well trained and equipped, they were ultimately unable to prevail against the superior firepower of the Australian infantry and gunners, which had turned the battle in their favour. Throughout the night, fire support was co-ordinated by the 1 RAR command post and the fire support co-ordinating centre, which controlled integral fires from 102nd Field Battery, its direct support battery, as well as from 161st Battery RNZA and the 81 mm mortars from 3 RAR. Yet the Australian gunners soon ran out of flechette rounds, and they were forced to use standard high-explosive with their direct-action fuses set to 'delay'. The guns were then depressed to fire the shell at the ground approximately 40 to 50 metres (44 to 55 yd) in front of the emplacement, which caused the round to ricochet and explode in the air above the heads of the assaulting force, an expedient which proved very effective. The Australians were also supported by artillery from neighbouring American batteries that were in range, as well as by aerial strafing from helicopter gunships and continuous illumination by flares. Forward observers adjusted the artillery to within 20 metres (22 yd) of the Australian position, while AC-47 Spooky gunships fired thousands of rounds into the assaulting forces.

After an hour of intense fighting, by 04:30 the main attack began to falter and the PAVN subsequently withdrew into a rubber plantation to the north-east, carrying many of their dead and wounded. However, in an attempt prevent the Australians from following them a company-sized force remained, and the Australian gunners attempted to engage them with their remaining flechette rounds and high explosive. Taking advantage of the extinguishing of a fire that the Australians had been using to direct the helicopter gunships, the PAVN again attacked at 05:00 in an effort to further cover their withdrawal. Greatly reduced in strength, the attack was quickly broken up in a crossfire of high explosive and flechettes. A series of sporadic contacts then took place between the Australians and withdrawing PAVN, while at 05:30 a helicopter light-fire team became effective and forced the PAVN rearguard to abandon its positions. Also during this time, rockets and mortars had landed on B Company, 1 RAR 1,500 metres (1,600 yd) to the south-east, killing one Australian and wounding another. At 05:45, 161st Battery RNZA began firing on likely withdrawal routes as the pre-dawn light began to appear. The Australians then began a sweep of their position, with the 102nd Field Battery clearing the gun position while Bennett accompanied the 1 RAR Anti-Tank Platoon and a regimental medical officer's party to clear the rest of the perimeter. PAVN soldiers were subsequently located, with the last killed in the gun position at 06:10. The two patrols then met in the mortar position while a patrol from 3 RAR carried out a similar sweep from north to south, and FSB Coral was finally cleared by 06:25. By 06:30 the evacuation of the Australian dead and wounded began by helicopter. The PAVN finally completed their withdrawal by 08:00.

No. 6 Gun the day after the first attack on FSB Coral, 13 May 1968

The fighting had been costly for both sides. Australian casualties included nine killed and 28 wounded, while one howitzer and two mortars had been damaged. (Note: The bulk of the Australian casualties had been suffered by the 1 RAR Mortar Platoon. Those men not killed or wounded suffered battle shock and they were subsequently withdrawn to Nui Dat and temporarily replaced by men from 3 RAR until reinforcements could be obtained.) PAVN casualties included 52 dead, who lay strewn around the perimeter, while 23 small arms and seven crew-served weapons had also been captured by the Australians. While Radio Hanoi quickly announced a major PAVN victory there was little doubt that the Australians had convincingly repulsed the attack, even if they had come close to suffering a military catastrophe, with the task force headquarters itself nearly being destroyed. The initial delays during the fly-in had left the defenders spread haphazardly and, had the PAVN assaulted without the preparatory fire that ultimately alerted the Australians, the result may have been different. Equally, the fortunes of war had resulted in the Australian guns being laid in the direction of the main PAVN assault, and the firepower they afforded had probably been decisive. The occupation of FSB Coral was one of the first such operations conducted by 1 ATF and many of the deficiencies evident had been due to this inexperience. Command and control had been insufficient and in hindsight the lack of co-ordination in setting up the defence could have been avoided with the appointment of a local defence commander. The absence of proper aerial reconnaissance prior to insertion had also resulted in units and their supporting elements landing on unsuitable ground in full view of the PAVN, while the delay in the insertion of the second battalion denied them enough time to establish their positions before night fell. Failures in the assessment and timely distribution of intelligence were also identified.

=== 1 ATF consolidates in AO Surfers, 13–15 May 1968 ===
The 1 ATF forward tactical headquarters arrived from Bearcat by CH-47 on 13 May, while additional personnel and stocks were brought in by road convoy to establish the forward task force maintenance area. Hughes arrived at 08:00 and directed Bennett to redeploy his companies in all-round defence of FSB Coral, with 1 RAR consolidating their defensive arrangements with wire, sandbags, overhead protection and claymore mines, while tripod-mounted machine-guns were also emplaced to fire on fixed lines. Meanwhile, 3 RAR established FSB Coogee in AO Manly 4,000 metres (4,400 yd) west, with C Company securing the fire support base while the other three rifle companies conducted search operations which resulted in one being Australian killed. 161st Battery RNZA was then redeployed by air to Coogee. M113 armoured personnel carriers (APCs) from A Squadron, 3 CAV (less one troop)—under the command of Major John Keldie—arrived at Coral the same day, after escorting the rear echelons and 155 mm M109 self-propelled artillery from A Battery, US 2/35th Artillery Regiment. The M113s were then split between the fire support bases, with 1 Troop assigned to 1 RAR and 2 Troop to 3 RAR, with Keldie appointed as local defence commander at FSB Coral in order to co-ordinate the actions of units on the perimeter. 1st Field Squadron also provided engineer teams to each combat arm, while other elements prepared command post bunkers and fortifications within the fire support bases.

PAVN dead outside FSB Coral, 13 May 1968

The unsuccessful assault against FSB Coral on the night of 12/13 May had demonstrated that the PAVN would react violently to Australian attempts to control AO Surfers, and with 1 ATF deployed astride a key route to Saigon and threatening PAVN/VC bases and staging areas located nearby, further heavy fighting was expected over the following days. In response, the Australians were forced to refine their tactics and Hughes decided to establish strong defensive positions in order to destroy the PAVN by fire, rather than by the painstaking patrolling more familiar to the Australians. The FSBs would be heavily defended by night, while the battalions would conduct defensive patrols by day. Later, fighting patrols up to company-size with armoured support would then be used to locate and destroy the VC main force bases. As such the Australian concept of operations subsequently evolved from one of searching and clearing in order to locate and cut infiltration and withdrawal routes, into a series of reconnaissance-in-force operations from heavily defended bases. Meanwhile, in AO Manly, 3 RAR continued patrolling for the next seven days, successfully ambushing staging areas and infiltration routes between 13 and 19 May for the loss of one soldier killed.

On 14 May there were patrol clashes in AO Bondi, as both sides tried to determine the intentions of the other. The Australians sent out platoon-sized defensive patrols between 3 and 4 kilometres (1.9 and 2.5 mi) from Coral and in nine contacts they suffered three killed and five wounded, while PAVN casualties included 12 killed and two wounded. Later, two more Australians were wounded by an RPG fired into FSB Coral. During the afternoon, the patrol activity resulted in heavy fighting, and two separate actions fought within half an hour of each other by different platoons from 1 RAR led to two Australians being awarded the Distinguished Conduct Medal (DCM)—Lance Corporal David Griffiths and Private Richard Norden. Norden's DCM was upgraded to the Victoria Cross for Australia in 2024 following a review by the Defence Honours and Awards Tribunal. The PAVN/VC appeared to be probing the Australians to gain information on their dispositions and these efforts continued the following day with the defenders observing two PAVN near the perimeter of FSB Coral, while patrols from 1 RAR later contacted small groups and uncovered a recently used company-sized camp just 1,000 metres (1,100 yd) from the base. By 15 May, the Australians considered their defences to be properly co-ordinated, while nearby the PAVN 141st Regiment was again preparing to attack Coral after evading the intensive patrolling. Yet that night a large number of lights and flares were observed by the defenders, effectively warning them of the impending assault.

=== Second attack on FSB Coral, 16 May 1968 ===
At 02:30 on 16 May the PAVN began a heavy barrage of RPGs and mortar fire, concentrating on A Company 1 RAR, 1 ATF headquarters, and the forward task force maintenance area. Now heavily reinforced, the Australian and American artillery and mortars quickly responded with heavy counter-battery fire, with a total of 60 guns from three batteries of 105 mm field guns, one battery of 155 mm howitzers, one 8-inch (200 mm) battery and nine 81 mm mortars firing in support, augmented by air support from three heavy fire teams (each of three UH-1 helicopter gunships) and three fighter-bombers with bombs and napalm. Regardless, at 02:40 the PAVN launched a battalion-sized attack, which initially fell on A and B Companies. Even with the artillery and mortars concentrating on close defensive fire tasks, the assault was largely held at the perimeter, although they did succeed in over-running part of 3 Platoon, A Company. Commanded by Lieutenant Neil Weekes, the platoon had been hit heavily by indirect fire during the initial bombardment and had suffered several casualties. Concentrating on the gap created in the Australian perimeter, the PAVN then assaulted with the support of 12.7 mm DShK heavy machine-guns. Ordering his men to fix bayonets, Weekes successfully reorganised the defences however, and called in close mortar fire to stabilise the position, resulting in heavy casualties among the assaulting force. He was later awarded the Military Cross for his leadership. Unable to achieve a break-in, the PAVN then broadened their attack to include C Company, engaging three of the four Australian companies on the perimeter. Yet after successfully opening gaps in the wire, they failed to press home their attack.

By 04:00 A Company was still heavily engaged and the Australians called in helicopter light-fire teams and AC-47 gunships, which dropped flares continuously from 04:30 to illuminate the battlefield. By 05:00 the main attack was halted and the PAVN began withdrawing, just as the Australians were beginning to run low on ammunition. During the lull A Company was resupplied by APC, while the Australians pushed an RCL team forward to provide additional support. At 05:15 the PAVN attacked again, targeting the boundary between A and C Companies on the northern edge of the perimeter, only to be repulsed by mortar fire. Later a two-battalion attack on A, B and C Companies was also turned back. The Australians then counter-attacked with elements of A Company supported by APCs, regaining the lost 3 Platoon section post. Finally, after a six-hour battle the PAVN broke contact at 06:30 and withdrew with their dead and wounded, fighting a series of rearguard actions to prevent follow-up. The Australians also began collecting their casualties for evacuation, while another resupply was completed with APCs. 1 RAR subsequently commenced a clearance of the area, with the four Australian rifle companies patrolling to a depth of 1,000 metres (1,100 yd), killing one PAVN soldier and capturing another. Five Australians had been killed and 19 wounded, while two US artillerymen were also wounded during the fighting. Only 34 PAVN bodies were counted on the perimeter at dawn, however intelligence later indicated that fewer than 100 of the 790 attacking troops had survived unwounded. Meanwhile, in an attempt to disrupt the PAVN withdrawal, Keldie led a troop of cavalry from Coral, engaging a PAVN battalion during a pursuit that lasted until 15:00.

Centurion tanks arriving at FSB Coral

On 17 May, Westmoreland visited FSB Coral and congratulated the task force on its defence. Both Australian battalions continued to patrol with minor contacts, and during one such incident at least six PAVN were killed when a group of approximately 35 was engaged by artillery and armed helicopters after being observed by scouts from B Company, 3 RAR. During the week that followed Australian patrols clashed with groups of PAVN moving through AO Surfers, many of them from the PAVN 165th Regiment, which was believed to be withdrawing into War Zone D. A Company, 3 RAR subsequently occupied a blocking position on the Suoi Ba Pho creek, ambushing PAVN moving northwards and directing mortar firing onto evasion routes, killing eight and capturing two. Elsewhere, C Company, 3 RAR located and destroyed base camps in the vicinity of FSB Coogee. Meanwhile, with the approval of MacDonald, Hughes departed on a long-planned leave to Singapore on 18 May, and Colonel Donald Dunstan, the task force second-in-command, took over as Commander 1 ATF on 20 May. A respected and experienced leader, he quickly took control amidst growing tension.

At 01:00 on 22 May FSB Coral was again attacked, though not on the same scale as before, coming under a short but accurate mortar bombardment that was subsequently broken up artillery and mortar fire. In order to bolster his defences and provide an increased offensive capability, on 21 May Dunstan ordered the Centurion tanks from C Squadron, 1st Armoured Regiment to redeploy the 120 kilometres (75 mi) from Nui Dat. Under the command of Major Peter Badman, the slow-moving armoured column departed on 22 May, traversing the difficult terrain that included several old, rusting Bailey bridges, which threatened to collapse under the 50-tonne weight of the Centurions. Moving via the inland route under cover provided by an observation aircraft from 161st Reconnaissance Flight, they drove north on Route 2, then west on Highway 1 to Long Binh where they staged overnight. Just north of Blackhorse Base Camp the lead vehicle of the convoy hit a road mine, damaging a dozer tank but resulting in no casualties. They finally arrived at FSB Coral at 02:30 on 23 May. Four tanks from 1 Troop were subsequently allocated to 1 RAR, while 2 Troop was allocated to 3 RAR. Two American M42 40 mm Self-Propelled Anti-Aircraft Guns had also accompanied the tanks and further strengthened the Australian FSBs in a ground support role.

=== First attack on FSB Balmoral, 26 May 1968 ===
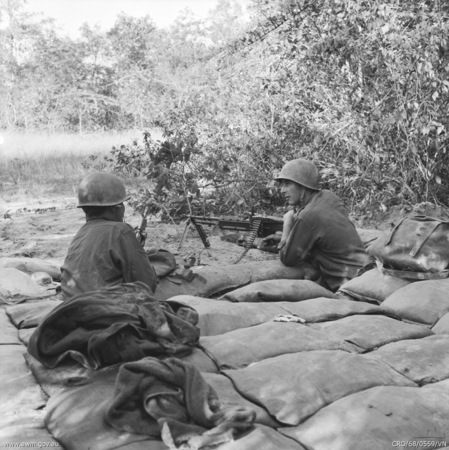
3 RAR machine-gun position at FSB Balmoral

With 3 RAR achieving limited results in AO Manly, MacDonald suggested that Dunstan establish the battalion in a new location east of Route 16 in order to locate and destroy the PAVN/VC bases suspected to be in the area. 3 RAR subsequently occupied FSB Balmoral in AO Newport, 4.5 kilometres (2.8 mi) north of Coral, on 24 May in the hope of provoking another battle. Shelton was keen to avoid the mistakes that had been made during the earlier occupation of FSB Coral however, and he sent two companies forward on foot to occupy the new fire support base while the battalion tactical headquarters accompanied them in APCs. During the insertion there were contacts between the Australians and PAVN, with at least one PAVN soldier being killed. Yet with B and D Companies securing the landing zone, the remainder of 3 RAR was inserted by helicopter from FSB Coogee in the late afternoon. FSB Balmoral would be developed as a battalion defensive position only, and 161st Battery RNZA was subsequently flown to FSB Coral, in order to concentrate all of the artillery in that location from where they would be able to cover the whole of the new AO. Meanwhile, the PAVN had been caught by surprise and, with no time to prepare an attack, they were unable to respond on the first evening. Regardless, 3 RAR worked quickly to establish their defensive position, digging in and laying wire and claymore mines.

On 25 May, 3 RAR began local defensive and familiarisation patrols. Four Centurion tanks from 2 Troop, C Squadron were ordered to redeploy to FSB Balmoral to bolster the defences, escorted by two infantry platoons from B Company, 1 RAR under Captain Bob Hennessy. En route, the PAVN engaged the Australian infantry from a series of bunkers, pinning them down with machine-gun fire at close range. In response the Australian tanks moved forward, suppressing the bunkers with canister rounds while the infantry was extracted. The Australians had struck the edge of a large, defended base camp estimated at company-size, however under orders to continue to Balmoral before nightfall, they broke contact. The column subsequently arrived at FSB Balmoral without further incident at 15:30 and B Company, 1 RAR then returned to FSB Coral by helicopter. At least two PAVN were killed in the encounter, while one Australian was wounded. Although a relatively minor action, the tanks had been decisive and the engagement was early proof of their effectiveness in co-operation with the infantry. Meanwhile, the PAVN commander was no longer able to tolerate the Australian encroachment into his base areas, and with FSB Balmoral located just 1,500 metres (1,600 yd) away, he subsequently tasked the 165th Regiment, commanded by Phan Viet Dong, to attack Balmoral. That evening tracer rounds, shots and lights again alerted the defenders of an impending attack.

At 03:45 on 26 May the PAVN began a heavy bombardment with mortar and rockets, accompanied by machine-gun and small-arms fire. Immediately following the barrage, Balmoral was subjected to a ground assault across the open ground from the north-east by a force of up to battalion strength, falling primarily on D Company, commanded by Major Peter Phillips. At the same time the PAVN conducted a feint on the southern perimeter opposite A Company—under Major Horrie Howard—using Bangalore torpedoes to break through the wire, although the gap was not exploited. (Note: There are some inconsistencies regarding the dispositions of 1 RAR during both attacks on FSB Balmoral. Some sources indicate that A Company occupied the western perimeter and that the feint had been conducted against the southern end of their positions, while C Company occupied the southern perimeter itself. Other sources place A Company on the southern perimeter with C Company to their west. The dispositions adopted here are those from the official history.) Two Centurions that had been sited directly on the main axis of assault but concealed during the day, rolled forward under the cover of darkness. Their machine-guns and canister rounds proved telling during the fighting; the main attack stalled as it reached the wire before being repelled with heavy casualties by the combined firepower of the Australian infantry and tanks. Meanwhile, as sporadic mortar, RPG and small-arms fire continued, to the south FSB Coral was also hit with suppressing fire from mortars, recoilless rifles and RPGs between 04:15 and 04:30, killing one Australian and wounding another. The defenders at Balmoral then directed fire from helicopter and AC-47 gunships onto likely assembly areas and mortar base plate locations. Around 05:00 the PAVN finally broke contact and withdrew, removing the majority of their casualties under covering fire as the Australian artillery fired on their escape routes. Clearing patrols from 3 RAR then swept the area at first light but found only six PAVN dead and a large quantity of weapons, ammunition and equipment. The Australians subsequently began the evacuation of their casualties, having lost a further three dead and 14 wounded.

=== Bunker clash and patrolling in AO Surfers, 26–27 May 1968 ===
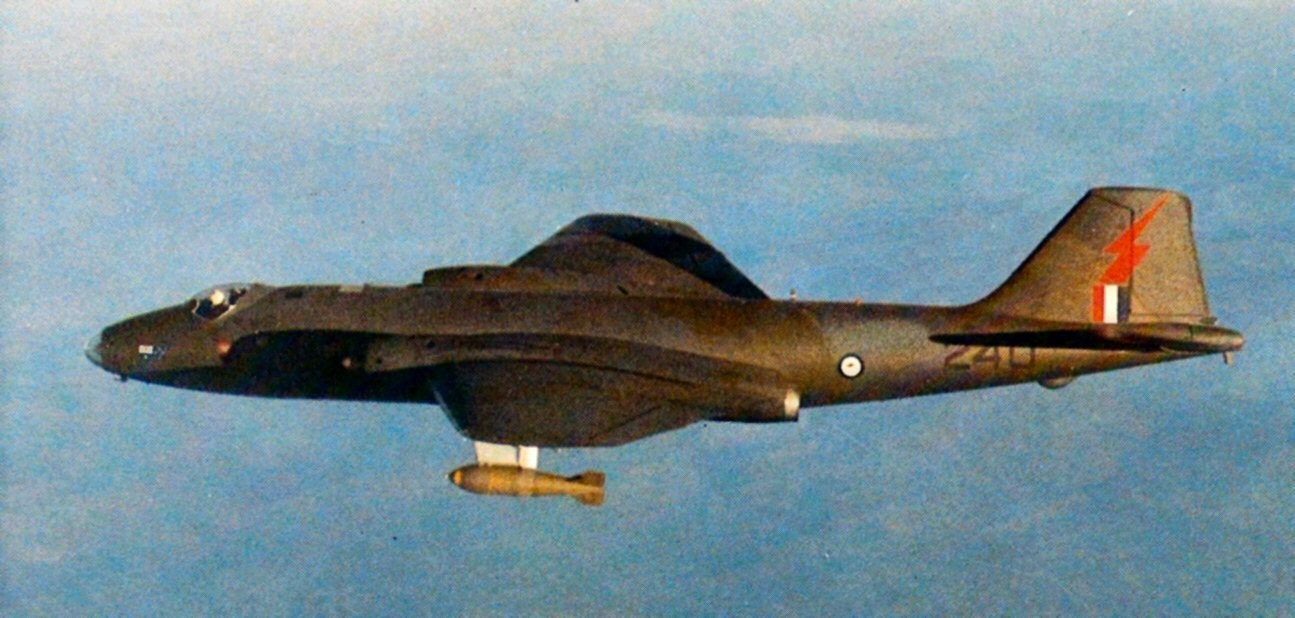
A Canberra bomber from No. 2 Squadron RAAF operating over South Vietnam

Dunstan subsequently directed the clearance of the bunker system that had been located the previous day, and a combined force of D Company, 1 RAR and 1 Troop C Squadron under the command of Major Tony Hammett was tasked with carrying out a reconnaissance-in-force. Departing at 06:00 on the morning of 26 May, at 12:27 the lead Australian infantry platoon was hit by small arms fire and RPGs 3,000 metres (3,300 yd) from Coral, after having paused to direct an air strike by Canberra bombers from No. 2 Squadron RAAF onto a nearby bunker system. In what would become the first Australian combined infantry and tank assault since the Bougainville campaign against the Japanese in the Second World War, the tanks were called forward and attacked the bunkers with anti-tank solid shot and machine-guns, while the infantry indicated targets with their M79 grenade launchers. Moving forward two or three abreast, the Centurions crushed many of the bunkers with their tracks and engaged others at point-blank range with their main armament. Further bunkers were exposed when the foliage was cut away by canister rounds and the infantry followed the tanks using rifles and grenades, while assault pioneers provided support with a flame-thrower as artillery and mortar fire engaged targets further away.

The bunkers were well constructed and camouflaged, while visibility was limited to just 10 to 20 metres (11 to 22 yd) among the dense vegetation and consequently many were not located by the Australians until they were upon them. The bunkers were sited to be mutually supporting, and the PAVN defending them responded with a crossfire of RPG-2s, although the heavy armour of the Centurions proved impervious and they remained undamaged. (Note: The newer RPG-7 was able to penetrate the Centurion hull however, as was demonstrated during subsequent contacts in the following months.) During a three-hour battle the Australians and PAVN fought each other from bunker to bunker. However, with aerial reconnaissance revealing that the bunker system was part of a much larger base area, and with the Australian force judged too small to deal with it, Bennett directed Hammett to retire by late afternoon. Amidst a heavy rain the Australians broke contact at 16:00 under the cover of artillery and mortar fire, and they moved quickly back to FSB Coral. Fourteen bunkers had been destroyed, while seven PAVN bodies were counted and quantities of weapons, ammunition and documents were also captured. Yet many more men were undoubtedly entombed in the bunkers after being crushed by the tanks, making a comprehensive body count impossible. Although it had been a fierce engagement the Australians suffered no casualties, a fact which was attributed to the effectiveness of the tanks, and further validated Dunstan's decision to call them forward from Nui Dat. Second Lieutenant John Salter was later awarded the Military Cross for his leadership during this and other actions.

Over the following days 1 ATF continued patrolling, although these operations resulted in only small-scale contact with the PAVN. On 27 May an Australian OH-13 helicopter was damaged by ground fire during a reconnaissance flight 3 kilometres (1.9 mi) outside AO Newport, and air strikes on the area exposed several bunkers which were likely to have been used by the PAVN as a headquarters; they were subsequently destroyed by artillery fire.

=== Second attack on FSB Balmoral, 28 May 1968 ===
Captured PAVN soldiers at Balmoral

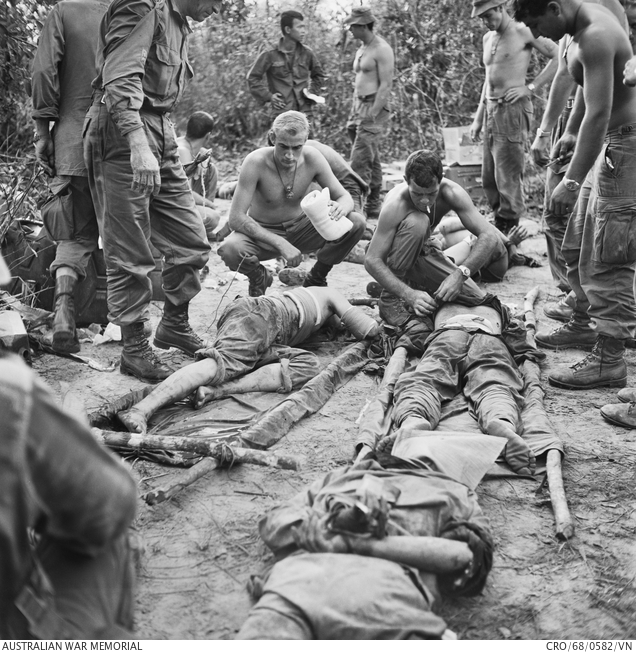
Wounded PAVN soldiers captured at Balmoral

A second regimental-sized attack against 3 RAR at Balmoral was launched by the PAVN at 02:30 on 28 May, with a two-battalion assault preceded by 60 mm and 80 mm mortar fire from the south. Meanwhile, FSB Coral was also attacked by indirect fire from 02:45. Similar to the attack two nights before, it began with another feint from the south as PAVN sappers blew up the wire in front of A Company, but was successfully broken up before it reached the wire by the Australian defenders with claymore mines and small-arms fire from their M60 machine-guns, L1A1 Self Loading Rifles and M16 assault rifles. The main assault began at 03:10 from the north-east, with the brunt again being borne by Phillips' D Company. The Australian infantrymen were once again supported by tanks firing canister shot and machine-guns, while artillery and mortars provided continuous close indirect fires, with the combined effect of this firepower stopping the PAVN on the wire before they could penetrate the position. Although the assault was well co-ordinated, the PAVN had lost the element of surprise, with the preparatory fire once more alerting the defenders. The assault was subsequently called off after 30 minutes, while at 03:40 a small probe developed from the east but quickly dissipated. Sporadic mortar and rocket fire continued to fall as helicopter light-fire teams and AC-47 gunships engaged the PAVN, directed by forward air control aircraft. From 05:00 until first light artillery from FSB Coral provided continuous battlefield illumination to stymie PAVN attempts to clear their dead and wounded, and they finally withdrew by 05:30.

At first light a clearing patrol from D Company, 3 RAR swept the area with tanks and APCs in support, killing and capturing some attackers who had been pinned down in old B-52 bomb craters to the north of Balmoral. The daylight revealed that the PAVN had once again been soundly defeated leaving 42 dead and seven prisoners, while Australian losses were one killed and eight wounded. Quantities of weapons, clothing, ammunition and equipment were also recovered by the Australians. Phillips was subsequently awarded the Military Cross for his leadership during the battle. Many of the PAVN dead were teenagers of 16 or 17 years, evidence that the North Vietnamese had begun drafting 15-year-old boys into its combat units; as had happened after the earlier fighting, their bodies were collected by a bulldozer and buried in a mass grave. Later, a large number of shell scrapes were discovered to the north-east of Balmoral during an aerial reconnaissance by an OH-13 helicopter, and they were thought likely to have been used by the PAVN as an assembly area before being engaged by artillery firing defensive fire tasks early in the battle. The successful defence of Balmoral and the high ratio of PAVN killed had confirmed the judgement of MacDonald and Dunstan and validated the decision to adopt an aggressive defence with strong static positions and forceful patrolling. The failed assault proved to be the final attempt to remove 1 ATF from AO Surfers, and there were no further attacks by the PAVN against either Coral or Balmoral.

=== Operation Toan Thang I concludes, 28 May − 6 June 1968 ===
The Australians continued to patrol aggressively, with further clashes occurring between companies from 1 RAR and 3 RAR, and the PAVN. On the morning of 30 May, C Company, 1 RAR under Major Ian Campbell had patrolled into a bunker system 3 kilometres (1.9 mi) east of FSB Coral and was contacted by a large dug-in PAVN force. At 08:30 the lead platoon, 9 Platoon, came under fire and was pinned down by RPGs and 7.62 mm RPD light machine-guns. Meanwhile, 7 Platoon moved to assist but was also pinned down, with one section suffering heavy casualties and losing an M60 machine-gun. Campbell struggled to establish a company defensive position, pushing 8 Platoon forward covered by armed helicopters and indirect fire. Yet with the two forces facing each other at only 10 to 15 metres (11 to 16 yd), the Australian artillery and mortars were rendered ineffective and Dunstan subsequently dispatched two tanks from Coral to reinforce them as heavy fighting developed. Supported by APCs, the Australian infantry and tanks then assaulted and cleared several bunkers, allowing the lead platoon to withdraw after three hours of fighting. Suffering one killed and seven wounded, C Company broke contact by 11:55, withdrawing 500 metres (550 yd) as artillery, mortars and air strikes engaged the bunker system. Three days later C Company returned to the area to recover the lost machine-gun only to find the position as they had left it; strewn with dead bodies and caved-in bunkers with the battlefield having been abandoned by the PAVN, who had also withdrawn following the Australian assault. The tanks had destroyed at least eight bunkers, while PAVN casualties included 24 dead and a further eight believed killed. Another group of 13 had also been engaged in the open by artillery, and were also possibly killed.

D Company, 1 RAR entering FSB Coral after a patrol

The PAVN then appeared to abandon AO Surfers to the Australians, and increasingly diverted their movement around Coral and Balmoral. Operation Toan Thang I continued for another six days regardless, and 1 ATF patrolled extensively into June. However, with contacts decreasing, on 1 June Weyand judged the Australian blocking operation to have been successful in limiting the offensive against Saigon, and directed US and ARVN units to relieve them. Meanwhile, Hughes returned from leave and visited Dunstan at FSB Coral to discuss the situation and the task force's redeployment to Phước Tuy. FSB Balmoral was subsequently declared closed on 5 June, with 3 RAR and its direct support battery returning to Nui Dat by air, while FSB Coral was also closed the following day. The operation finally concluded on 6 June, with 1 RAR returning to Nui Dat by CH-47 after handing over the area of operations to the US 1st Infantry Division, while the logistic, artillery and armoured elements returned by road convoy. Yet the approach of the wet season concerned Hughes, who believed it could hinder the movement of the Centurions and leave them stranded 120 kilometres (75 mi) from base until the dry season. Nonetheless, the tanks departed FSB Coral on 5 June; travelling via Bearcat and Route 15, the road move went without incident and they returned to Nui Dat by 17:00 on 6 June.

== Aftermath ==
=== Casualties ===
Although Operation Toan Thang I had begun relatively quietly for the Australians it had ended far more spectacularly. During 26 days of fighting they had inflicted punishing losses on the PAVN/VC and forced the PAVN 7th Division to postpone a further attack on Saigon. PAVN/VC casualties in AO Surfers included 267 killed confirmed by body count, 60 possibly killed, 7 wounded and 11 captured, while Australian losses were 25 killed and 99 wounded. (Note: Marginally different figures for North Vietnamese and Viet Cong casualties are provided in other sources, such as McNeill and Ekins who list 276 killed, 69 wounded/escaped, 11 captured and five detained. Horner provides similar figures, breaking them down into 238 North Vietnamese and 38 Viet Cong killed as determined by body count, with a further 69 claimed as killed.) Five New Zealanders and five American soldiers were also wounded. Westmoreland had been impressed by the results achieved by 1 ATF in May and June, and while US and South Vietnamese forces had undoubtedly borne the brunt of the fighting for the allies during this time, 1 ATF had featured prominently in American reports. The battle was the first occasion that the Australians had met the PAVN in regimental strength, and operating in depth in a series of engagements akin to conventional warfare they had ultimately fought their largest, most hazardous and most sustained battle of the war. For their involvement in the action the Royal Australian Regiment, the 3rd Cavalry Regiment and 1st Armoured Regiment were all subsequently awarded the battle honour "Coral-Balmoral", one of only five presented to Australian units during the war. On 14 May 2008 the 102nd Field Battery, RAA was awarded the honour title "Coral" in recognition of their involvement in the battle, the first such award to an Australian sub-unit.

=== Assessment ===
The fighting represented a watershed in the campaign for the Australians, and while they had deployed outside Phước Tuy Province previously, they now faced regular PAVN formations and VC Main Force units operating in battalion and regimental strength, rather than VC guerrillas. With 1 ATF deploying astride their lines of communication the PAVN/VC had been forced to respond, resulting in a set-piece battle far removed from the counter-insurgency doctrine the Australians normally espoused. Yet while the battle ended in victory for 1 ATF, they had come close to suffering defeat at the hands of the PAVN. Inexperienced at large air-mobile operations, poor reconnaissance and inadequate operational planning had caused delays and confusion during the fly-in to FSB Coral, leaving the Australian force exposed to attack on the first night. The PAVN had fought in greater numbers, with heavier firepower and greater intensity than previously experienced by the Australians in South Vietnam, forcing them to refine their tactics. Later, the Australian use of platoon patrols to search an area and conduct ambushes was challenged by the constant movement of PAVN forces operating in superior strength, which threatened to quickly overwhelm an isolated patrol.

Meanwhile, prolonged operations outside of Phước Tuy during the first half of 1968 had placed considerable strain on the Australian logistic system. Australian logistic resupply arrangements for Operation Toan Thang I had been modelled on the experience of Operation Coburg, and again required the Vũng Tàu-based 1 ALSG to be split in order to provide a forward logistic element at the US base at Long Binh. A forward task force maintenance area had also been established, first at Bearcat and then later at FSB Coral. Re-supply by road had continued daily from Long Binh to Bearcat, while following the move to Coral re-supply was primarily by air due to the threat of possible interdiction. Movement from unit echelons in the forward maintenance area was also undertaken by helicopter. Units in the field received one fresh meal each day, with the other two meals based half on the American C ration and half on the Australian combat ration. Although the supply of fuel and ammunition was generally satisfactory, stocks had run dangerously low on one occasion during heavy fighting at FSB Coral due to the calculation of usage rates based on previous operations, requiring an emergency night-time resupply by CH-47 while the base was under attack. Re-supply of water had also been particularly difficult due to unavailability of a permanent water point. Ultimately water had to be delivered by air from Long Binh at a rate of 14,000 liters (3,700 U.S. gal) per day using rubber fuel bladders.

PAVN dead outside FSB Balmoral, 26 May 1968

While many of the failings in Australian command arrangements evident from the initial stages of the battle were rapidly rectified as 1 ATF developed more exact standard operating procedures, future operational planning would need to pay greater heed to intelligence when determining the strength of patrols, as well as providing for quick reaction forces and rapidly responsive indirect fires to support sub-units operating independently. Ultimately though the firepower of the Australian combined arms teams proved decisive. Indeed, while the value of using armour in South Vietnam was originally questioned by the Australian Army, the performance of the tanks during the fighting at Coral and Balmoral demonstrated their advantages once and for all. Indeed, whereas before the battle some infantry had doubted the usefulness or necessity of the Centurions, afterwards they did not like working without them. Over the next four years the tanks would provide invaluable close support, particularly during the clearance of bunker systems, proving to be powerful weapons in both offence and defence and were later credited with limiting casualties among the Australian infantry.

In contrast, for the PAVN the battle was just one part of the May Offensive, although they later claimed to have killed 800 Australians during a single attack—a fact which may have indicated the importance they placed on it at the time. (Note: Although years later the fighting at Coral and Balmoral did not rate a mention in the PAVN official history of the conflict.) They had reacted quickly and proficiently to mount a battalion attack on the first night in an attempt to push the Australians off their line of communications; however, while the attacks on Coral and Balmoral had been well co-ordinated, the PAVN/VC had repeatedly surrendered the element of surprise with preparatory fire and poor light discipline alerting the defenders on each occasion. Meanwhile, rigid command-and-control arrangements and a lack of radio communications had forced the PAVN to operate on fixed schedules, preventing them from taking the initiative or responding rapidly to changing situations. Such inflexibility had resulted in predictability, with the PAVN commanders ultimately committing their forces to a frontal assault on Coral on the first night, and mounting very similar attacks against Balmoral on the nights of 26 and 28 May, both of which ended in costly failures.

=== Subsequent operations ===
Meanwhile, 4th Battalion, Royal Australian Regiment (4 RAR) had arrived to replace 2 RAR. Joined by two New Zealand infantry companies—W and V Companies—it was designated 4 RAR/NZ (ANZAC) and under the command of Lieutenant Colonel Lee Greville they commenced operations in June. Later, on 13 June, 1 RAR was again deployed to protect the bases at Long Binh and Biên Hòa from rocket attacks, operating to the north and east of Biên Hòa as part of a wider allied operation, known as Operation Toan Thang II. On 23 June the battalion was joined by 4 RAR/NZ (ANZAC) and 1 ATF headquarters was deployed under Dunstan's command as the operation expanded. On 3 July, 1RAR was relieved by 3RAR and returned to Nui Dat. Largely uneventful, the operation resulted in minimal contact and lasted until 18 July. Three VC were killed and 13 captured, while Australian casualties included one killed and one wounded. The Australians then attempted to interdict VC supplies, with a small force of tanks and APCs supported B Company 3 RAR occupying the area along Route 15 to the west and north-west of Bà Rịa, the provincial capital, between 25 and 30 June during Operation Ulladulla. As part of the operation the tanks ambushed a river and sank seven loaded sampans with their 20-pounder main armament.

Operations outside the province over the previous eighteen months had been costly, and of the 228 Australians killed and 1,200 wounded during the war to that point, almost two-thirds had been killed since January 1967. (Note: 147 Australian soldiers were killed in Vietnam between January 1967 and 30 June 1968, with 62 killed and 310 wounded in the first six months of 1968 alone.) From July, 1 ATF completed search-and-clear operations along the northern border areas and west of their Tactical Area of Responsibility in Phouc Tuy Province.

Meanwhile, the VC began their Phase III Offensive on 17 August 1968, attacking dozens of towns and military installations throughout South Vietnam with rockets and mortars, including Saigon. As part of the allied response the Australians were deployed to defend Bà Rịa while during 20–23 August, B and C Company, 1 RAR with a troop of Centurion tanks were involved in intense urban fighting while supporting South Vietnamese forces to clear a company-sized force from the VC D445 Battalion occupying Long Dien. At least 17 VC were killed during the fighting, while Australian casualties included six wounded. During the next three weeks, all three Australian battalions were deployed on search-and-destroy operations, yet the VC successfully eluded them. Continuing until 30 September, the renewed offensive lacked the scale of the previous attacks and again resulted in heavy communist casualties, failing to produce lasting military gains and contributing to an overall decline in PAVN/VC combat power in the south. Yet such failures were neither final nor decisive and Hanoi seemed to increasingly hold the upper hand. The war continued regardless, while allied military strategic objectives were increasingly coming into question. In late-1968 1 ATF was again deployed outside its base in Phước Tuy, operating against suspected PAVN/VC bases in the May Tao and Hat Dich areas as part of Operation Goodwood. The operation led to sustained fighting during a 78-day sweep between December 1968 and February 1969 and later became known as the Battle of Hat Dich.

== Notes ==
Footnotes

Citations
