= A Field Battery, Royal Australian Artillery =

Australian Army artillery battery

'A' Battery, Royal Australian Artillery
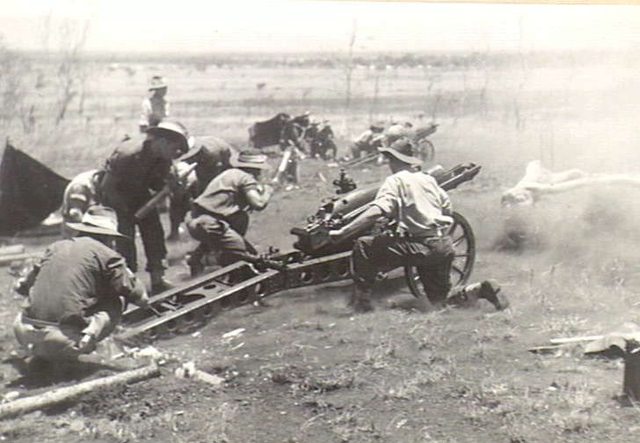
- Members of the battery at Nadzab, New Guinea, September 1944
- Active: 1 August 1871 – present
- Country: Australia
- Branch: Army
- Type: Artillery
- Role: Field artillery
- Size: 1 artillery battery
- Part of: 7th Brigade
- Garrison/HQ: Enoggera Barracks
- Motto: Semper Paratus
- Engagements: Sudan Campaign; Second Boer War; First World War: Gallipoli Campaign; Western Front; Second World War: New Guinea campaign; Malayan Emergency; Indonesian Confrontation; Vietnam War; East Timor; Afghanistan

'A' Field Battery is an artillery battery of the Australian Army. The unit has been in existence since 1871, having originally been raised as part of the New South Wales colonial defence force. As part of several different larger formations, the battery has served in many conflicts including the Sudan Campaign, the Second Boer War, the First World War, the Second World War, the Malayan Emergency, Confrontation, and the Vietnam War. Today it is part of the 1st Regiment, Royal Australian Artillery, attached to the 7th Brigade based at Enoggera, Queensland. It was previously an airborne unit, but no longer maintains that role. It is currently equipped with M777 howitzers.

== History ==
=== Formation and early history ===
'A' Field Battery was originally formed as a permanent unit on 1 August 1871 following the withdrawal of British artillery units from Australia. This unit was equipped with four 9-pounder guns and two 24-pounder howitzers and had a strength of 100 personnel. The battery was deployed in 1885 to support the British during the Sudan Campaign. Consisting of seven officers and 168 enlisted personnel, under the command of Colonel John Richardson, the battery was re-equipped by the British with six 9-pounder guns and embarked from Sydney in early March. Most of the major fighting had concluded by the time the battery arrived and, after training, it undertook defensive duties to protect the railway around Handoub, remaining until May when it was withdrawn back to Australia. The battery lost three men from disease during the expedition. One officer was detached and served with the British Army in Burma at this time.

The battery's next involvement in conflict came during the Second Boer War, deploying aboard the transport Warrigal on 30 December 1899. Consisting of 179 personnel, including five officers, the battery was equipped with six 15-pounder field guns, and throughout the war deployed mainly in detached sections, each consisting of two guns. During the war, the battery was involved in several important actions, such as playing an important role in the capture of the Boer commander Christiaan de Wet's artillery pieces.

'A' Battery returned to Australia in August – September 1901. During its deployment, it lost one man killed in action, two died of disease; 45 others were returned to Australia due to illness. For its service in South Africa, the Royal Australian Artillery, represented primarily by A Battery NSW Regiment RAA, but also including the Machine Gun Section, Queensland Regiment RAA, and many individuals of the Queensland, NSW and Victoria Regiments RAA, was presented a Kings Banner. It was not the only Commonwealth artillery unit to have been honoured in this way, and Kings Banners were also awarded to the Royal Canadian Field Artillery, the Royal Canadian Garrison Artillery, the Cape Field Artillery, the Cape Garrison Artillery, and the Natal Field Artillery.

Following Federation, the battery became part of the Royal Australian Artillery Regiment, and consisted of four guns, based in Sydney. The battery was later used to raise the horsed 'A' Instructional Cadre. When the instructional cadres were disbanded in 1910, No. 1 Field Battery was formed as part of the permanent field artillery.

=== First World War ===
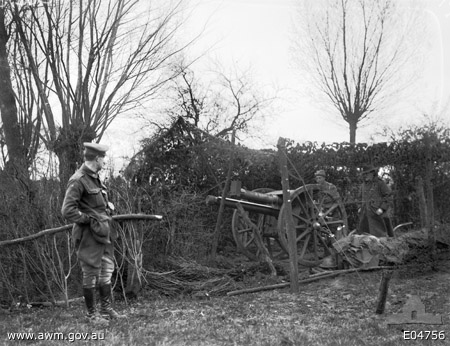
Two Australian soldiers and an officer, at a camouflaged gun position of the 1st Australian Field Artillery Brigade.

Following the outbreak of the First World War in 1914, the 1st Battery Royal Australian Field Artillery (RAFA) was used to raise the 1st Australian Imperial Force (AIF) Battery, along with other volunteers from the permanent batteries in Victoria and Queensland. Forming part of the 1st Australian Field Artillery Brigade, the battery was among the first units of the AIF to leave Australia. Following a period of training and preparation in Egypt with the rest of the AIF, the unit served at Gallipoli, where the brigade supported the British 29th Division around Cape Helles from early May. By October 1915, the brigade was transferred to Anzac Cove to support the Australian 2nd Division. After the evacuation of Allied troops from the peninsula in December, the brigade returned to Egypt for reorganisation before deploying to France and Belgium for service on the Western Front commencing in mid-1916. Consisting of the 1st, 2nd, 3rd and 101st Batteries, the 1st Field Brigade supported the 1st Division.

=== Second World War ===
Following the war, the battery was reconstituted and provided a mounted escort in Sydney during the Prince of Wales visit to Australia in 1920. During the period between the wars, the battery undertook several changes in name, eventually being designated A Field Battery, Royal Australian Artillery Regiment. In the final years before the war, it was expanded to two sections. Throughout the 1920s and 1930s, the battery changed its designation several times.

At the outbreak of the Second World War, A Field Battery came under the command of the School of Artillery, Holsworthy, in their mobilization role as Depot Battery. However, in August 1943, A Field Battery was reorganized to form the 2nd Australian Mountain Battery, following the successful involvement of the 1st Mountain Battery during operations around Buna and Wau. Equipped with 75 mm pack howitzers, under the command of Major William Stevenson the 2nd Mountain Battery arrived in New Guinea in September of that year, initially based around Port Moresby with the 3rd Division. In November, the battery was transferred to the 9th Division to provide support around Finschhafen. In early 1944, the battery moved to Lae and was re-assigned to support the 7th Division in the Finisterre Ranges, where its operations were hampered due to limited transport in the difficult terrain. The battery was moved to Dumpu in April 1944, where it came under the command of the 11th Division, before moving to Lae in May.

In November 1944, it subsequently moved to Bougainville for operations as part II Corps, initially based around Torokina, until moving forward to Pearl Ridge after its capture in late 1944, to support the Australians across the centre of the island towards the coast, operating under the command of first the 23rd Brigade and then later the 11th Brigade. In January 1945, the battery supported a landing around Amun, followed by an attack on a strong Japanese position. Further actions continued through March and April, during which the battery came under strong Japanese counter-battery fire. In June, the battery supported the failed amphibious landing at Porton Plantation. The battery remained deployed until the end of the war in August 1945.

=== Service since 1945 ===
Following the end of the war, and returning to its original name, the battery was part of the British Commonwealth Occupation Force in Japan; drawing personnel from the Royal Australian Artillery Headquarters and the 2nd Mountain Battery, the battery formed at Balikpapan on 7 October 1945 the 6th Independent Field Battery. Under the command of Major Thomas Rodriguez, the battery operated 25-pounder field guns over this period. On 21 February 1946, 2nd Mountain Battery was re-designated as 'A' Field Battery. On 22 December 1948, the battery returned to Australia based at North Head. On 25 May 1949, the battery became part of the 1st Field Regiment. In 1951, the battery moved to Georges Heights. In January 1955, the battery was re-designated as 100th (A) Battery. On 1 September 1957, the battery detached from the 1st Field Regiment for the Malayan Emergency arriving at Penang in October remaining overseas for two years. In 1958, the battery returned to the A Battery designation. The battery supported several Commonwealth Infantry Battalions and was closely associated with 2nd and 48th Field Regiments, Royal Artillery. On return to Australia, the battery rejoined 1st Field Regiment at Holsworthy. It also later served during the Indonesian Confrontation detaching again to join the 28th Commonwealth Infantry Brigade Group at Terendak Garrison on 21 October 1965. On 12 September 1967, the battery returned to Australia and became 'A' Field Battery, 19th Composite Regiment, Royal Australian Artillery at Holsworthy.

In October 1969, the battery became 'A' Field Battery, 12th Field Regiment, Royal Australian Artillery. The battery served in the Vietnam War arriving on 4 July 1971 at the 1st Australian Task Force base at Nui Dat deploying individual forward observers and guns at Nui Dat and several fire support bases to support the 3rd Battalion, Royal Australian Regiment (3 RAR) until November 1971. In 1974, following the amalgamation of regiments the battery became 'A' Field Battery, 8th/12th Medium Regiment, Royal Australian Artillery.

In 1984, the battery assumed the role of parachute deployable artillery for 3 RAR as part of the Parachute Battalion Group. In 1995, 105mm L119 Hamel guns were air dropped for the first time by the battery. In 1999, the battery deployed personnel to serve in East Timor as part of INTERFET. The same year the battery was made an independent battery after 8th/12th Medium Regiment moved to Darwin. In 2002, the battery became part of 4th Field Regiment. The battery adopted 3 RAR's parachute wings and dull cherry beret. In April 2002, the battery deployed to East Timor as part of UNTAET and later UNMISET in non-artillery roles with 3 RAR returning in October 2002.

The battery has since deployed personnel in artillery roles to Iraq and Afghanistan with the Reconstruction Taskforce and on secondment to 29th Commando Regiment Royal Artillery. The battery has also deployed personnel to East Timor for Operation Astute in non-artillery roles. In the late 2000s, the Parachute Battalion Group changed to an Airborne Combat Team reducing the battery's role supporting 3 RAR to maintaining the parachute qualifications of observers. On 30 September 2010, the battery became part of 1st Field Regiment and moved to Enoggera Barracks in Queensland in January 2011. An artillery parachute capability was to be maintained by a battery within 4th Field Regiment. In January 2011, the battery was re-roled into a gun battery and re-designated as 'A' (Gun) Battery, 1st Regiment, Royal Australian Artillery with the word "field" dropped from the battery's and regiment's title. Reorganising into a gun battery meant the loss of the battery's forward observers and joint-fire teams. The same year the battery equipped with the new M777A2 155mm Lightweight Towed Howitzer (LWTH). In 2012, the battery was to reorganise back to a traditional battery role by the end 2013 with the designation 'A' Battery.

== Lineage ==
The battery's lineage is as follows:

- 1871–1876 — A Battery, New South Wales Artillery
- 1876–1891 — No 1 Battery, New South Wales Artillery
- 1891–1893 — The Field Battery, New South Wales Artillery
- 1893–1899 — 'A' Battery, New South Wales Artillery
- 1899–1902 — 'A' Battery, New South Wales Regiment of Royal Australian Artillery (Field)
- 1902–1903 — 'A' Battery, Royal Australian Artillery
- 1903–1910 — 'A' Instructional Cadre, Royal Australian Artillery Regiment
- 1910–1911 — No 1 Battery, Australian Field Artillery (Permanent)
- 1911–1920 — No 1 Battery, Royal Australian Field Artillery
- 1920–1927 — 1st Battery, Royal Australian Field Artillery
- 1927–1930 — 1st Field Battery, Royal Australian Artillery
- 1930–1936 — 1st Field Cadre, Royal Australian Artillery
- 1936–1939 — 1st Field Cadre, Royal Australian Artillery Regiment
- 1939–1942 — 'A' Field Battery, Royal Australian Artillery Regiment
- 1942–1943 — Depot Battery, LHQ School of Artillery (Field, Medium, Survey)
- 1943 — 2nd Aust Mountain Battery (Mechanised)
- 1943–1945 — 2nd Aust Mountain Battery (Mechanised) (Australian Imperial Force)
- 1945–1946 — 2nd Mountain Battery
- 1946–1949 — 'A' Field Battery, Royal Australian Artillery Regiment
- 1949–1955 — 'A' Field Battery, 1st Field Regiment, Royal Australian Artillery
- 1955–1958 — 100 (A) Field Battery, Royal Australian Artillery
- 1958–1965 — 'A' Field Battery, 1st Field Regiment, Royal Australian Artillery
- 1965–1966 — 'A' Field Battery, 45th Light Regiment, Royal Artillery
- 1966–1967 — 'A' Field Battery, 6th Light Regiment, Royal Artillery
- 1967–1969 — 'A' Field Battery, 19th Composite Regiment, Royal Australian Artillery
- 1969–1974 — 'A' Field Battery, 12th Field Regiment, Royal Australian Artillery
- 1974–1999 — 'A' Field Battery, 8th/12th Medium Regiment, Royal Australian Artillery
- 1999–2002 – 'A' Field Battery, Royal Australian Artillery
- 2002–2010 — 'A' Field Battery, 4th Field Regiment, Royal Australian Artillery
- 2011–2012 — 'A' Gun Battery, 1st Regiment, Royal Australian Artillery
- 2012–Present — 'A' Battery, 1st Regiment, Royal Australian Artillery

== See also ==
- Airborne forces of Australia

== Bibliography ==
- "Gunnery by Decades" (PDF). Gunfire : Newsletter of the Royal Australian Artillery Association. No. 3. November 2013.
- "New Colonel Commandant" (PDF). The Royal Australian Artillery Liaison Letter. No. Autumn. Puckapunyal: Deputy Head of Regiment, School of Artillery. 2006.
- "Old unit, new tricks" (PDF). Army: The Soldiers' Newspaper. No. 1261. Canberra: Department of Defence. 23 June 2011. ISSN 0729-5685. Archived from the original (PDF) on 27 February 2012.
- Burke, Arthur (2006). "Porton, One Beach Too Far – Bougainville 1945". Sabretache. 47 (1). Military Historical Society of Australia: 5–8. ISSN 0048-8933.
- Cornelia, Major G.J.S. (2010). "ADF Joint Entry Operations: why conventional airborne forces are fundamental" (PDF). Australian Defence Force Journal (183). Canberra: Department of Defence: 35. ISSN 1320-2545.
- Hill, Lt Col Damian (2015). "Evolution of 4th Regiment 2008 – 2015 & Beyond" (PDF). The Royal Australian Artillery Liaison Letter. No. Autumn. Puckapunyal: Deputy Head of Regiment.
- Horner, David (1995). The Gunners: A History of Australian Artillery. Sydney, New South Wales: Allen & Unwin. ISBN 1-86373-917-3.
- Gilby, Sgt Noel (September 1995). "Airborne". Army magazine. No. 24. Canberra: Army Newspaper Unit. ISSN 1034-3695.
- Kelly, Major D. (2004). "'A' Field Battery" (PDF). The Royal Australian Artillery Liaison Letter (Spring). Puckapunyal: Deputy Head of Regiment, School of Artillery.
- Kennedy, Lt-Col Mitch; Doran, LCpl Mark (3 March 2011). "Changes in artillery" (PDF). Army: The Soldiers' Newspaper. No. 1253. Canberra: Department of Defence. ISSN 0729-5685.
- McKenzie-Smith, Graham (2018). The Unit Guide: The Australian Army 1939–1945, Volume 3. Warriewood, New South Wales: Big Sky Publishing. ISBN 978-1-925675-146.
- Nöthling, CJ, ed. (1987). Ultima Ratio Regum (The Last Argument of Kings): Artillery History of South Africa. Pretoria: Military Information Bureau, SADF. OCLC 638019935.
- Orpen, Neil (1965). Gunners of the Cape: The Story of the Cape Field Artillery. Cape Town: CFA Regimental History Committee. OCLC 556943477.
- Schinkel, AB Melanie; King, Cpl Zenith (14 October 2010). "A Fd Bty gets ready for move" (PDF). Army: The Soldiers' Newspaper. No. 1246. Canberra: Department of Defence. ISSN 0729-5685.
- Watkins, Lt Peter (March 2008). ""A" Field Battery. Switched On and Eveready" (PDF). A Field Battery Association, Inc. National Newsletter.
