= 105th Medium Battery, Royal Australian Artillery =

105th Medium Battery Royal Australian Artillery
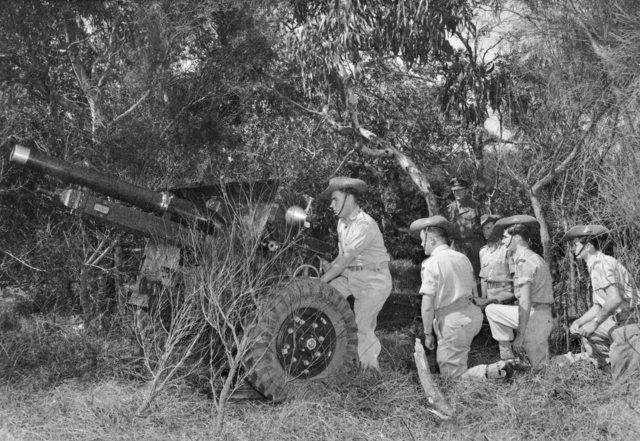
- A 105th Field Battery gun team in 1955
- Active: March 1916 – 28 February 1919; 1921 – December 1940; 1 July 1955 – present
- Country: Australia
- Branch: Army
- Type: Artillery
- Role: Close Fire Support
- Part of: 1st Regiment, Royal Australian Artillery
- Garrison/HQ: Gallipoli Barracks
- Nickname(s): The Mighty Tigers
- Motto(s): Ubique (Everywhere) (Latin)
- Engagements: World War I: Egypt; Sinai; Western Front; Vietnam War: Battle of Long Tan

The 105th Medium Battery is a unit of the Royal Regiment of Australian Artillery that can trace its history back to March 1916, when it was raised as 105th Howitzer Battery in Egypt. The battery is based at Gallipoli Barracks, Enoggera, Queensland, as a full-time regular army unit and is one of three batteries that make up the 1st Regiment, in the 7th Brigade.

== History ==
The 105th Howitzer Battery was raised in March 1916 in Egypt as a part of the 22nd Howitzer Brigade, following a decision to equip each infantry division with a howitzer brigade, and embarked for Marseille, France shortly thereafter.

=== World War I ===
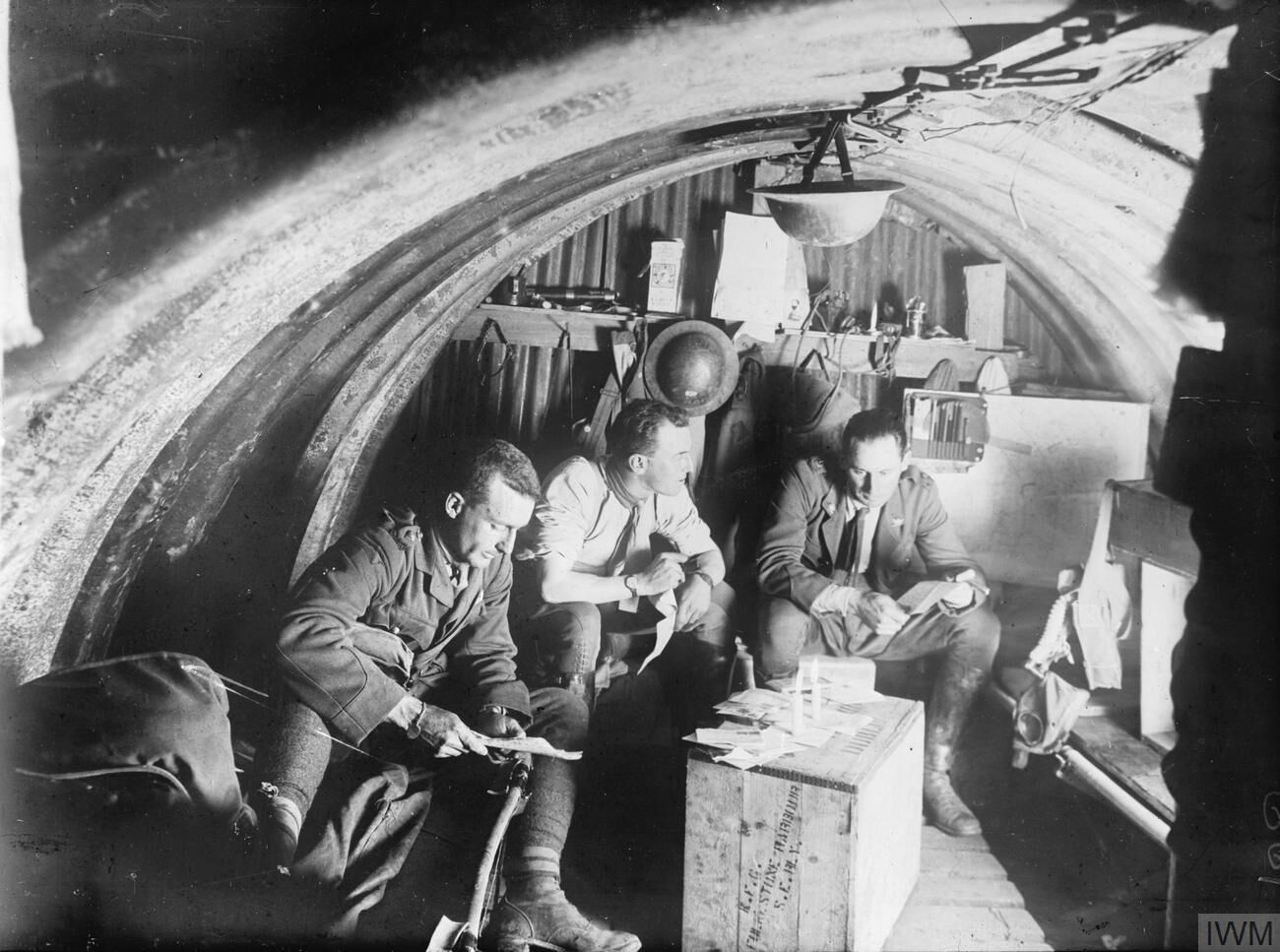
Officers of the battery inside a dugout, Ypres, August 1917

By 11 May 1916, the battery joined 13th, 14th and 15th Batteries at Fleurbaix, France (5 km SW of Armentières) to form 5th Field Brigade Australian Field Artillery of 2nd Division Artillery, after a reorganisation of the artillery saw each field brigade having twelve 18 pound guns and four QF 4.5-inch (114 mm) howitzers. The howitzer brigades then became field artillery brigades also, seeing the 105th Howitzer Battery become the 105th Field Artillery (Howitzer) Battery.

In January 1917, batteries were increased in size from four to six guns each in order to economise on battery and brigade commanders. The battery was disbanded following cessation of hostilities on 30 March 1919.

=== 1921 to 1940 ===
Following a restructure of the Citizen's Army, based on the framework of the 1st AIF, in 1921, the 105th Field (Howitzer) Battery was re-raised, along with the rest of the 5th Field Regiment. The 15th Battery was an exception, not being re-raised until 1938. The battery was based at Gona Barracks at Kelvin Grove, Queensland at this time.

During the years prior to World War II, the battery conducted several training camps around Brisbane. The battery embarked on their first annual training camp, held on the southern shores of the Brisbane River at Lytton in 1927. During 1930, two training camps were conducted. The first commenced on 4 April at Enoggera, with the second, commencing on 30 June, being conducted at Lytton. A training camp during March 1931 was conducted at Bellevue Station, near Ipswich. At this time, the battery was still using horses for transportation of personnel and its guns.

A new artillery range was opened by Assistant Minister for Defence Mr. J. Francis in September 1934 at Mound Walker (near Rosewood). The battery trekked 50 miles (80 km) to attend the opening of the new range, as well as conduct a joint exercise with the 111th Battery. This exercise was held annually until 1939, when the Caloundra Range was established on a beach 64 miles (103 km) to the north of Brisbane.

During the 1937 exercises, cars and utilities were used for transportation by Battery staff, with other Battery personnel utilising horses. The introduction of Fordson Gun Tractors in 1938 saw the battery's guns being towed by the tractors, with the staff reverting to riding horses. The battery was fully mechanised from November 1939 onwards. The battery was again disbanded in December 1940, with members of the 5th Field Regiment amalgamating to form the newly raised 2nd/5th Field Regiment. This unit was later re-designated 2nd/1st Anti Tank Regiment.

=== 1955 to present ===
The battery was re-raised on 1 July 1955 as an independent battery of 1st Field Regiment at Holsworthy Barracks. Shortly thereafter, the battery was deployed on a tour of Malaya, lasting from September 1955 to June 1957. The battery remained as a unit of the 1st Field Regiment until 1960, when the battery moved to Sanananda Barracks, Wacol to become a founding member of 4th Field Regiment.

==== Vietnam ====
The battery was involved in two tours of Vietnam. The first from 14 September 1965 to October 1966. It was during this tour, on 18 August 1966, that the battery was involved in the Battle of Long Tan. The second and last tour of Vietnam lasted from February 1969 to March 1970. In 1976, the battery detached from the 4th Field Regiment and moved to its current home at Gallipoli Barracks, Enoggera to join 1st Field Regiment.

==== Recent history ====
On 1 July 2005, after 50 years of continuous service as a field battery, 105th Battery's 105mm L119 Hamels were replaced with 155mm M198 howitzers, with the battery being re-raised as 105th Medium Battery on 2 July 2005. At the same time the gun troops and other sub-units of the battery were named

Command Troop "Somme"
Gun Troop "Perak" (Malay Theatre)
Gun Troop "Kedah" (Malay Theatre)
Joint Offensive Support Team (JOST) "Dekker".

In 2009, 15 members of the 105th Medium Battery deployed to train with the British Army. After training in Northern Ireland together with the British unit, they deployed to Helmand Province, Afghanistan in 2010. This was the first time since the Vietnam War that 105th Medium Battery personnel have been deployed in their role as artillery operators in combat.
