= 1st Field Artillery Battery (Australia) =

- Active: August 1914 - November 1918
- Country: Australia
- Branch: Australian Army
- Type: Artillery
- Engagements: Egypt, Gallipoli, Western Front

1st Field Artillery Battery was formed in August 1914 in New South Wales from 1st, 2nd and 3rd Royal Australian Field Artillery batteries of the regular army and assigned to 1st Field Artillery Brigade. 1st Battery departed for Egypt on 18 October 1914, the battery saw action in Egypt, Sinai and the Western Front.
