= 104th Field Battery, Royal Australian Artillery =

104 Field Battery, Royal Australian Artillery
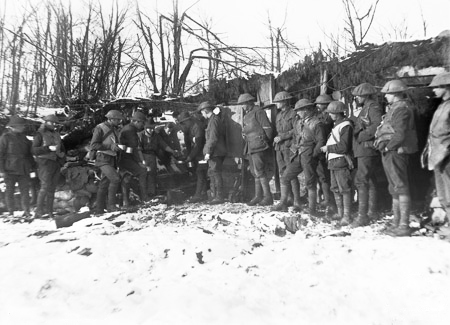
- Men of 104th Field Battery line up for a hot tea ration in Belgium in 1917
- Active: 1916–present
- Country: Australia
- Branch: Australian Army
- Type: Artillery
- Role: Indirect fire support
- Part of: 1st Regiment, Royal Australian Artillery
- Garrison/HQ: Enoggera Barracks
- Nickname: The Germs
- Motto: The Professionals
- Mascot: The Germ

The 104 Field Battery, Royal Australian Artillery was formed in the town of Moascar in Egypt during March 1916 during the First World War, as the 104th Field Artillery (Howitzer) Battery, part of 4th Field Artillery Brigade. The battery was disbanded in 1919, but the name was used for a new battery raised in 1965, which later formed part of the Australian military involvement in the Vietnam War. It is now one of three gun batteries in 1 Regt RAA.

== History ==
=== World War I ===
The 104th Field Battery, Royal Regiment of Australian Artillery, had its beginnings in Egypt, in March 1916. At this time the Battery was raised as a part of the general expansion of divisional artillery prior to the AIF being dispatched to France. In mid-March 1916 the battery sailed for France, and upon their arrival were issued with new 4.5 inch howitzers, reunited with their horses and commenced training. On 21 April 1916, 104th Howitzer Battery relieved C Battery of 176 Brigade Royal Field Artillery (RFA) on the line south east of Armentières, exchanging guns in the process. Shortly after this, they were deployed to the Somme and saw their first real action on the Western front. After the Third Battle of Ypres, the battery fired in support of the British 30th Division and the British 7th Brigade in the Battle of the Hindenburg Line.

Over the next two years, the 104th Field Battery, as part of the 2nd Division Artillery, saw intense and unrelenting action on the Western Front, with almost 58% of the total gunners deployed from Australia being killed. After victory was declared the battery returned to Australia and was disbanded.

In the Second World War, the previous practice of having independent artillery batteries was abandoned in favour of allocating batteries to artillery regiments, and so the 104th title was not used in that conflict.

=== Vietnam War ===
The 104 Battery name was revived in September 1965 as a medium battery equipped with BL 5.5-inch medium guns, but in 1967, these were replaced by M2A2 howitzers, changing its designation to a field battery. The unit served two tours of South Vietnam; the first was from May 1968 to May 1969 as part of 12 Field Regiment, supporting 4 RAR. On returning to Australia, the battery regrouped in Holsworthy, and moved up to Townsville in preparation for its second tour of Vietnam. The battery's second tour was from May 1971 to December 1971, again supporting 4 RAR. 104th Field Battery was the last Australian Field Artillery unit to leave Vietnam. On returning to Australia the Battery was located at Coral Lines Ingleburn with 12th Field Regiment.

=== Post-Vietnam ===
For a short period time the battery participated in peacetime training and support activities, but with the formation of 8th/12th Medium Regiment, the Battery was disbanded in December 1973.

In November 1977 the Battery was re-raised as part of the 8th /12th Medium regiment with M2A2 (105 mm) guns. Soon after the re-raising, the battery took part in its most important peacetime action. In February 1978, following a bomb blast at the Hilton Hotel in Sydney, the decision was made to call in the Army to secure Bowral, the venue for the Commonwealth Heads of Government Regional Meeting. However, on 15 June 1979 the battery was once again formally disbanded.

=== Recent history ===
In October 1985 the battery was re-raised as an Army Reserve Unit, as part of 1st Field Regiment in Brisbane, and again issued with the 105mm M2A2 Howitzer. The M2A2 was replaced in October 1990, with the 105mm L118/L119 Hamel Gun.

In January 1992 the Regiment converted to the Ready Reserve Scheme, attracting a large increase in numbers to the battery and Regiment. The scheme involved members undertaking a contract to work full-time for 12 months, then work 50 days a year for the next four years.

In December 1996, the Ready Reserve Scheme was completed, however the Battery continued to foster 'Ready Reserve Soldiers' until 2000, when the Battery assumed the composition of a general reserve unit.

104 Field Battery was disbanded on 1 July 2005 during a parade held by 1st Field Regiment to retask 105 Field Battery to a Medium Battery role. Personnel were transferred to the reserve element of 105 Medium Battery and to other batteries within the regiment.

As part of an Army wide restructuring of Artillery units, the Battery was re- raised in 2011 as an observation battery and saw overseas service again embedded with the 8/9 RAR battle group on MTF-4 Operation Slipper Led by then Major James and Captain Perkins. In 2014 it was again restructured as a conventional battery with Observers, CP and M777 Gun line. It is currently building its manning to be a full sized battery in the coming years.
