= 8th/12th Regiment, Royal Australian Artillery =

- Active: 1973–present
- Country: Australia
- Allegiance: Commonwealth of Australia
- Branch: Army
- Type: Artillery
- Role: Field artillery
- Size: Three batteries
- Part of: 1st Brigade
- Garrison/HQ: Robertson Barracks, Darwin
- Colours: Blue and red
- March: Quick – Royal Artillery Quick March; Slow – Royal Artillery Slow March
- Anniversaries: 16 November
- Decorations: Unit Citation for Gallantry (12th)

Commanders
- Current commander: Lieutenant Colonel S.J. Colclough
- Ceremonial chief: Elizabeth II

Insignia
- Unit colour patch
- Abbreviation: 8/12 Regt

The 8th/12th Regiment, Royal Australian Artillery, was formed at the Holsworthy Barracks on 16 November 1973 through the amalgamation of the 8th Medium Regiment (RAA) and the 12th Field Regiment (RAA). The Regiment provides field artillery support to the 1st Brigade based in Darwin. It is currently equipped with 155mm M777 Howitzers.

The 8th Medium Regiment, known in the 1950s as the 19th Composite Regiment, was created in February 1968 to provide a united administrative command of several independent artillery units in the Holsworthy Barracks area and had the primary role of providing support to the School of Artillery. The 12th Field Regiment had been reformed at Holsworthy in April 1966, and its elements served in Vietnam in 1968 and 1971. Before relocating to Darwin, the regiment was stationed in Townsville (Queensland) and Ingleburn (New South Wales).

The three of the regiments current Gun batteries reflect their formation in Egypt as part of the First Australian Imperial Force 21st Field Artillery (Howitzer) Brigade, which used 4.5-inch (110 mm) howitzers. The 101 and 103 Batteries, including the 102 Battery, served in France, also as part of the 1st Division.

== History ==
=== 101st Battery ===
The 101st Medium Battery was originally formed as the 101st Howitzer Battery on 8 March 1916, at Tel-el-Kebir, from the members of the 1st Field Artillery Brigade, which formation served at Gallipoli. Although disbanded after the war, in the early 1920s, the Battery was reformed as a militia unit in the Newcastle area, but in 1946 it was again disbanded. In 1957, it was established again as the 101st Field Battery, at the Holsworthy Barracks, as part of the 1st Field Regiment (RAAC). It served in Malaya (1959/61), and was deployed twice to South Vietnam (1966–67 and 1969–70). It relocated to Wacol in 1970 before moving again to Enoggera in 1982 to rejoin the 1st Field Regiment.

=== 102nd Battery ===
The 102nd Field Battery was formed in 1957 at Holsworthy Barracks, Sydney, as part of the 1st Field Regiment.

The battery served during the Indonesia–Malaysia confrontation between May and August 1965. While in Malaysia, the battery provided fire support during the Kesang River incursion by Indonesian forces. While serving in North Borneo, equipped with L5 Pack Howitzers, the battery provided defensive support to the 3rd Battalion, Royal Australian Regiment, as well as Ghurkha, and British Battalions undertaking operations; it also fire support for secret Claret operations in Indonesian territory.

On 18 April 1966, the battery was transferred to the 12th Field Regiment with the 104th Field Battery. Arriving in Vietnam as part of Australia's commitment to the Vietnam War in March 1968, replacing the 106th Field Battery and was equipped with the 105mm M2A2 Howitzer. On the night of 12 May 1968, while at Fire Support Base Coral, a M2A2 howitzer was captured by North Vietnamese troops who temporarily overran part of the base; however, the gun was recaptured shortly afterwards. The 102nd Field Battery was replaced in February 1969, and returned to Australia. During its tour of duty, the battery had been positioned at 30 different Fire Support Bases, fired 60,000 rounds and received the following decorations: 1 MM, 2 MID, 1 MBE and 1 BEM.

The battery became part of the 8th/12th Medium Regiment in November 1973 and in 1983, after being re-equipped with the M198 155mm howitzer, was redesignated 102nd Medium Battery before being disbanded in 1987.

=== 103rd Battery ===
The immediate predecessor of the first Australian Battery to be numbered "103", the 103rd (Howitzer) Battery AIF (3rd (Army) Field Brigade) was the 26th Indian (Jacob's) Mountain Battery, which was present at ANZAC Cove during the Battle of Gallipoli. On 6 March 1916, the Battery was created as part of the Australian Army contingent before departing for France as part of the 12th Howitzer Brigade. The 103rd Field Battery (Howitzer) was reformed after the First World War as part of the Citizen Military Forces from 1920 to 1941 stationed at Victoria Barracks, Paddington, moving to Guilford, Western Australia in 1921.

Before the Second World War, the Battery was absorbed into the Field Batteries of the 3rd Field Regiment, and did not see service as a unit. The battery was reformed as the 103rd Anti-Aircraft Battery from 1954 to 1957; it was stationed at Middle Head Barracks, Sydney, as part of 1 Field Regiment. During 1960 to 1967, it changed designation again to the 103rd Field Battery, as part of the new Regular 4th Field Regiment stationed at Wacol, Brisbane. During the deployment of the Australian Army to Malaysia, the Battery was part of the Far Eastern Strategic Reserve stationed at Camp Terendak, Malacca, returning to Australia to become a part of the 1st Field Regiment at Kokoda Barracks, Holsworthy. It was again deployed, this time to South Vietnam, with the new light L5 105 mm howitzers in May 1966 at the Nui Dat Task Force base, from which it contributed significantly to the outcome of the Battle of Long Tan. During its first tour in Vietnam, the Battery fired 28,468 rounds in support of allied troops. On 19 June 1967, it became the 103rd Independent Medium Battery stationed at Gallipoli Barracks, Holsworthy, supporting the School of Artillery, providing gun salutes, and conducting some limited trials. However, this non-combat role ended on 16 April 1968 when the battery joined the 19th Composite Regiment (RAAC), located at Kokoda Barracks. On 4 August 1969, the 19th Composite Regiment was renamed as the 8th Medium Regiment.

During the Vietnam War, the 104th Field Battery also served with the 12th Field Regiment – to which the 161st Field Battery RNZA was also attached.

=== Post Vietnam ===
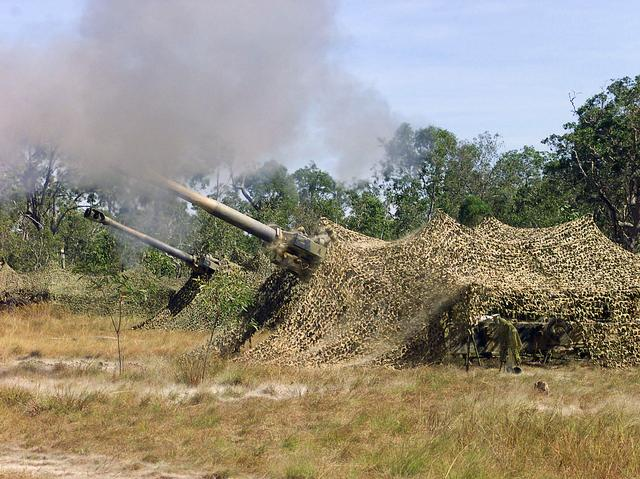
M198 of 101 Medium Battery, 8/12 Medium Regiment in 2001.

The Regiment was a creation of the reorganisation of the Australian Army as a result of the Vietnam War experience. During the mid-1970s, the 8th/12th Medium Regiment included:

Headquarters Battery
"A" Field Battery
103 Medium Battery
102 Field Battery (disbanded in 1987)
131 Divisional Locating Battery
Light Aid Detachment (LAD) staffed by RAEME

While the regiment was responsible for providing direct support to the 1st Task Force, the 103rd Battery also served in the role of depot support for the School of Artillery. Consequently, it was issued with six M2A2 105 mm guns as well as six 5.5-inch (140 mm) guns.

As part of the 1980s restructuring, the 131st Divisional Locating Battery became an independent battery for divisional assignment at Enoggera Army Camp in Brisbane. The 102nd Field Battery was redesignated as the 102nd Medium Battery, and then disbanded in 1987. As a result of this downsizing, the Headquarters Battery was reduced in size in 1994.

During 1996, the 101st Field Battery was removed from the 1st Field Regiment and embedded as a Fire Support Company in the 6 RAR, which adopted the A 21 Motorised Battalion structure that included supporting arms under the Restructuring of the Army (RTA) initiatives trial.

After the deployment to East Timor, "A" Field Battery was assigned to the 4th Field Regiment, Royal Australian Artillery in 1999, further reducing the Regiment in size. During 1999, the 8th/12th Medium Regiment was relocated to Robertson Barracks in Darwin. While preparing for the move from Sydney to Darwin, the 103rd Medium Battery deployed its elements to East Timor as part of the INTERFET, and later as a part of a UN Peace Keeping Force OP TANAGER, and was later joined by the newly recreated 101st Medium Battery.

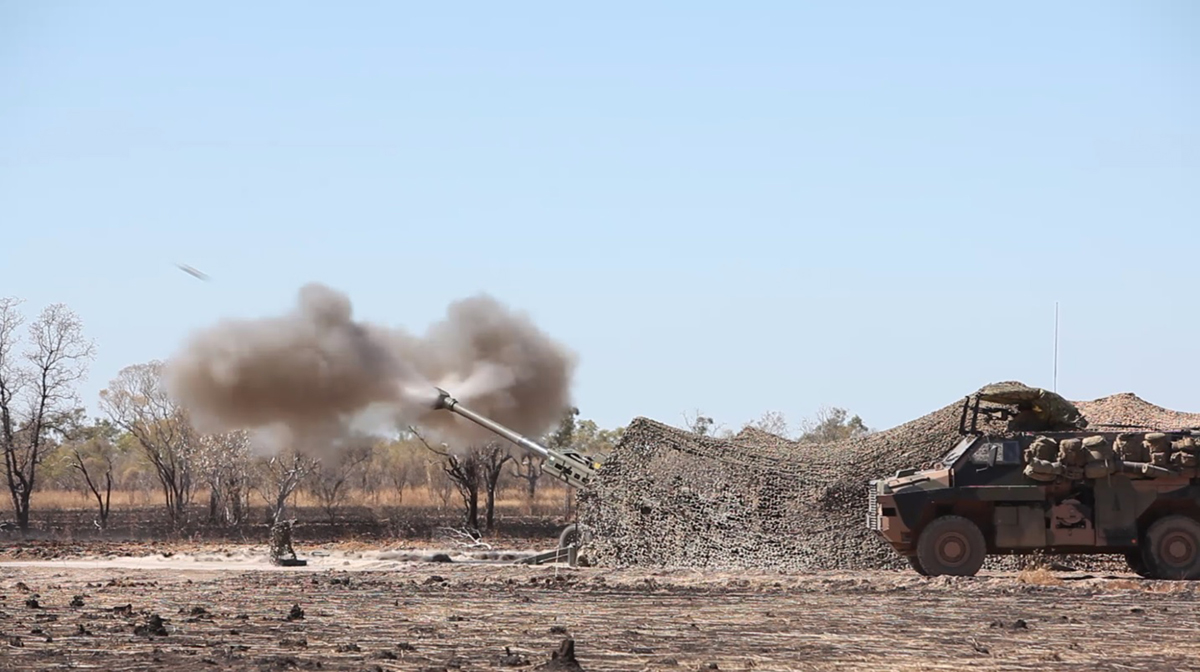
An 8th/12th Regiment M777A2 lightweight 155 mm howitzer firing during an exercise in 2015

In January 2011, the Australian Regular Army's field regiments were reorganised in preparation for re-equipment with new guns and battle management systems. Each regiment was to contain three observation post batteries, supported by a single gun battery equipped with 12 guns. As part of this reorganisation, the regiments were renamed, with the words "field" or "medium" removed from their title. Under the new structure, each regiment is capable of providing a brigade-level Joint Fires and Effects Coordination Centre (JFECC) and every observation post battery provides a battle group JFECC as well as three combat team joint fires teams (JFT). Every gun battery now comprises three troops of 155 mm towed howitzers.

In 2011, the 102nd Coral Battery was re-raised at RAAF Base Edinburgh. In 2008, the Governor-General had awarded the 102nd Field Battery with the Honour Title 'Coral' in recognition of conduct during the Battle of Coral in the Vietnam War. The 115th Battery was also raised in 2011 in theatre with Mentoring Task Force 2 in Afghanistan.

Under the Land 17 project, in 2012, the 8th/12th Regiment received the Advanced Field Artillery Tactical Data System (AFATDS), which is a fully automated digital battle-management system. It will also take delivery of the Digital Terminal Control System for observation post batteries. The regiment is currently based at Ypres Lines, Robertson Barracks, Palmerston; however, the 102nd battery is based at the Royal Australian Air Force base, Edinburgh. The gun troops are currently equipped with M777 LWH.

In January 2014, the 102nd Coral Battery relocated from RAAF Base Edinburgh to Robertson Barracks.

== Current formation ==
The regiment consists of the following units:

- 101st Battery (littoral Intelligence, Surveillance, and Reconnaissance (ISR))
- 102nd (Coral) Battery
- 103rd Battery
- Operations Support Battery
- Combat Service Support Battery

== Commanding officers ==
- Lieutenant Colonel J.D. Kelly (April 1967 – October 1969)
- Lieutenant Colonel W.A. Whyte MC (August 1969 – February 1970)
- Lieutenant Colonel B.R. Topfer (October 1969 – July 1972)
- Lieutenant Colonel W.N. Reid (May 1970 – January 1972)
- Lieutenant Colonel G. Barnard (July 1972 – November 1973)
- Lieutenant Colonel P.T. Gowans (January 1972 – November 1973)
- Lieutenant Colonel J.E. Jenvey MBE (November 1973 – December 1975)
- Lieutenant Colonel J.F. Bertram (December 1975 – May 1977)
- Lieutenant Colonel K.W. Mackenzie (May 1977 – December 1978)
- Lieutenant Colonel S.N. Gower (December 1978 – November 1980)
- Lieutenant Colonel A.P. Williams (November 1980 – December 1982)
- Lieutenant Colonel J.H. Phillips (December 1982 – December 1984)
- Lieutenant Colonel M.G. Boyle (December 1986 – December 1988)
- Lieutenant Colonel P.J. Lawrence (December 1988 – January 1991)
- Lieutenant Colonel J.R. Cox (January 1991 – December 1992)
- Lieutenant Colonel W.R. Vickers (December 1992 – December 1994)
- Lieutenant Colonel M.J. Schafer (December 1994 – January 1997)
- Lieutenant Colonel B.M. Armstrong (January 1997 – January 1999)
- Lieutenant Colonel P.D. Winter CSC (January 1999 – December 2000)
- Lieutenant Colonel R.M. Manton (December 2000 – January 2003)
- Lieutenant Colonel P.D. McLachlan (January 2003 – January 2005)
- Lieutenant Colonel G.W. Finney (January 2005 – January 2007)
- Lieutenant Colonel C.D Furini CSC (January 2007 – January 2009 )
- Lieutenant Colonel N.T. Sweeney (January 2009 – December 2010)
- Lieutenant Colonel A.M. Haebich (December 2010 – December 2012)
- Lieutenant Colonel J.J. West (December 2012 – December 2014)
- Lieutenant Colonel R.J. Alsworth (December 2014 – December 2016)
- Lieutenant Colonel D.A. Ryan (December 2016 – December 2018)
- Lieutenant Colonel J.R. Wheatley (December 2018 – December 2020)
- Lieutenant Colonel T Watson (December 2020 – December 2022)
- Lieutenant Colonel S.J. Colclough (December 2022 – Present)

== Battle honours ==
- Vietnam War: Coral (102 Battery)
