= 1st Regiment, Royal Australian Artillery =

Australian Army unit

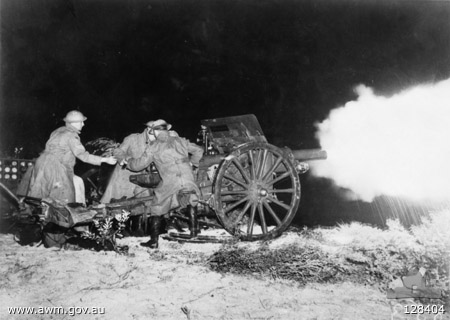
- Members of the 1st Field Brigade firing an 18 pounder gun during a night exercise
- Active: 1914–present
- Country: Australia
- Branch: Australian Army
- Type: Artillery
- Role: Indirect fire support
- Size: 4 artillery batteries
- Garrison/HQ: Enoggera Barracks
- Engagements: First World War; Second World War; Vietnam War: Battle of Long Tan; International Force East Timor; War in Afghanistan; Iraq War

Insignia
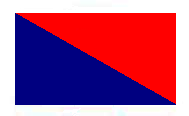
- Unit colour patch

The 1st Regiment, Royal Australian Artillery is a close support regiment attached to the 7th Brigade at Enoggera Barracks in Queensland. The unit was formed in 1914 under the name 1st Australian Field Artillery Brigade, part of 1st Division Artillery during World War I and later served in World War II and the Vietnam War. It is currently re-equipping with M777A2 lightweight towed howitzers.

== History ==
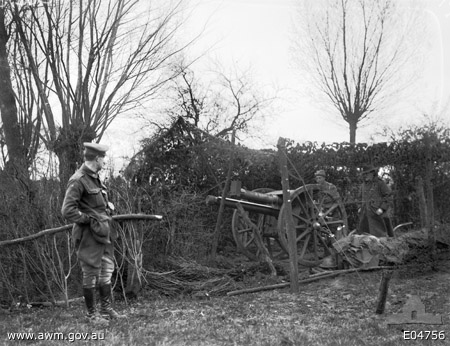
Two Australian soldiers and an officer, at a camouflaged gun position of the 1st Australian Field Artillery Brigade.

=== World War I ===
The 1st Field Regiment was formed in 1914 following the outbreak of World War I, designated as the "1st Field Artillery Brigade". The brigade saw action on the Gallipoli Peninsula in 1915, supporting the British 29th Division around Cape Helles from early May, and then the Australian 2nd Division around Anzac Cove from October until the force was withdrawn back to Egypt. From mid-1916, the brigade supported the 1st Division on the Western Front until the end of the war in November 1918. During this time, the regiment consisted of the following: the 1st Field Artillery Battery, 2nd Field Artillery Battery, 3rd Field Artillery Battery, 101st Field Artillery (Howitzer) Battery and the 1st Brigade Ammunition Column.

On cessation of hostilities in 1918, the 1st Australian Field Artillery Brigade returned to Australia where it was disbanded in 1919.

=== World War II ===
In the interwar years, the 1st Field Regiment was raised again as a Militia formation. Later, during World War II, this regiment served within Australia. In addition to this regiment, the 2/1st Field Regiment was raised as part of the all volunteer Second Australian Imperial Force.

The 2/1st Field Regiment was raised on 31 October 1939 at Ingleburn, New South Wales. The regiment saw action in North Africa supporting the 6th Australian Division from late 1940. As the 6th Division went into action for the first time, the regiment took part in the battles for Bardia, Tobruk and Derna. Barce was captured next, followed by Benghazi. The 1st Field Regiment's barracks located at Enoggera is named Barce Lines to commemorate this victory. In March and April, the regiment was deployed to Greece, but the campaign was short lived as the German invasion rapidly overwhelmed the defending Allied forces. The regiment was evacuated from Kalamata, having lost it guns, and was rebuilt in Palestine, before being withdrawn back to Australia in early 1942, following Japan's entry into the war.

The regiment served two tours in New Guinea. The first began in September 1942 when the regiment supported the 16th Brigade during the final stages of the Kokoda Track campaign, while other elements of the regiment took part in the Battle of Buna–Gona and the defence of Wau. During this time, the regiment expanded existing doctrine for the deployment of artillery by deploying guns into forward areas by air. The regiment returned to Australia for reorganisation in August 1943, and did not see action again until late in the war. It returned to New Guinea in January 1945 to support operations in the Aitape–Wewak campaign, supporting the defence of the airfield around Aitape, the advance on Wewak and operations around Mount Shiburangu. The regiment was in occupation of these areas when the war ended on 15 August 1945. The last of the regiment returned to Australia in January 1946 and was disbanded several weeks later as part of the post war demobilisation.

=== Post World War II ===
1st Field Regiment was raised on 25 May 1949 at North Head, Sydney. At that time it was the only regular artillery regiment. On the eve of the Vietnam War the Regiment consisted of 101st Field Battery and 105th Field Battery (Independent), both equipped with 105 mm L5 Pack Howitzers, 102nd Light (4.2 inch Mortar) Battery and a Headquarters Battery. In April 1965 the decision was taken to deploy the 1st Battalion, Royal Australian Regiment (1RAR) to Vietnam. This resulted in an expansion of artillery regiments by the addition of a third field battery. 1st Field Regiment's order of battle for deployment to Vietnam was 101st Field Battery, 105th Field Battery, 161st Battery, Royal New Zealand Artillery and Headquarters Battery. 1 RAR deployed to Vietnam in May 1965 with fire support initially provided by 161 RNZA; however, in September 1965 the 105th Field Battery arrived to provide additional fire support. With the expansion of the Australian force to two Battalion Groups in June 1966, the remainder of the Regiment, less 101st Field Battery, deployed to Vietnam accompanied by 103rd Field Battery, under the command of Lieutenant Colonel Richmond Cubis. In addition, six 155 mm M109 self-propelled howitzers from A Battery, US 2/35th Artillery Battalion were permanently attached at Nui Dat.

On 18 August 1966, the Regiment took part in the Battle of Long Tan in support of D Company, 6 RAR, firing 3,198 rounds from their L5s in three hours of battle with the artillery proving critical in ensuring the survival of the infantry. In September 1966, 105th Field Battery was replaced by 101st Field Battery and returned to Australia. In May 1967, the Regiment completed its first tour of duty in Vietnam and was replaced by 4th Field Regiment, Royal Australian Artillery. The Regiment, rejoined by 105th Field Battery, relocated to Sanananda Barracks, Wacol. The 103rd Field Battery was re-roled as a medium battery and moved to 12th Medium Regiment. In February 1969, 105th Field Battery returned to Vietnam for a second tour of duty to be followed by the remainder of the Regiment a month later. On completion of their final tour of duty, the Regiment returned to Sanananda Barracks, Wacol in March 1970.

=== Post Vietnam ===
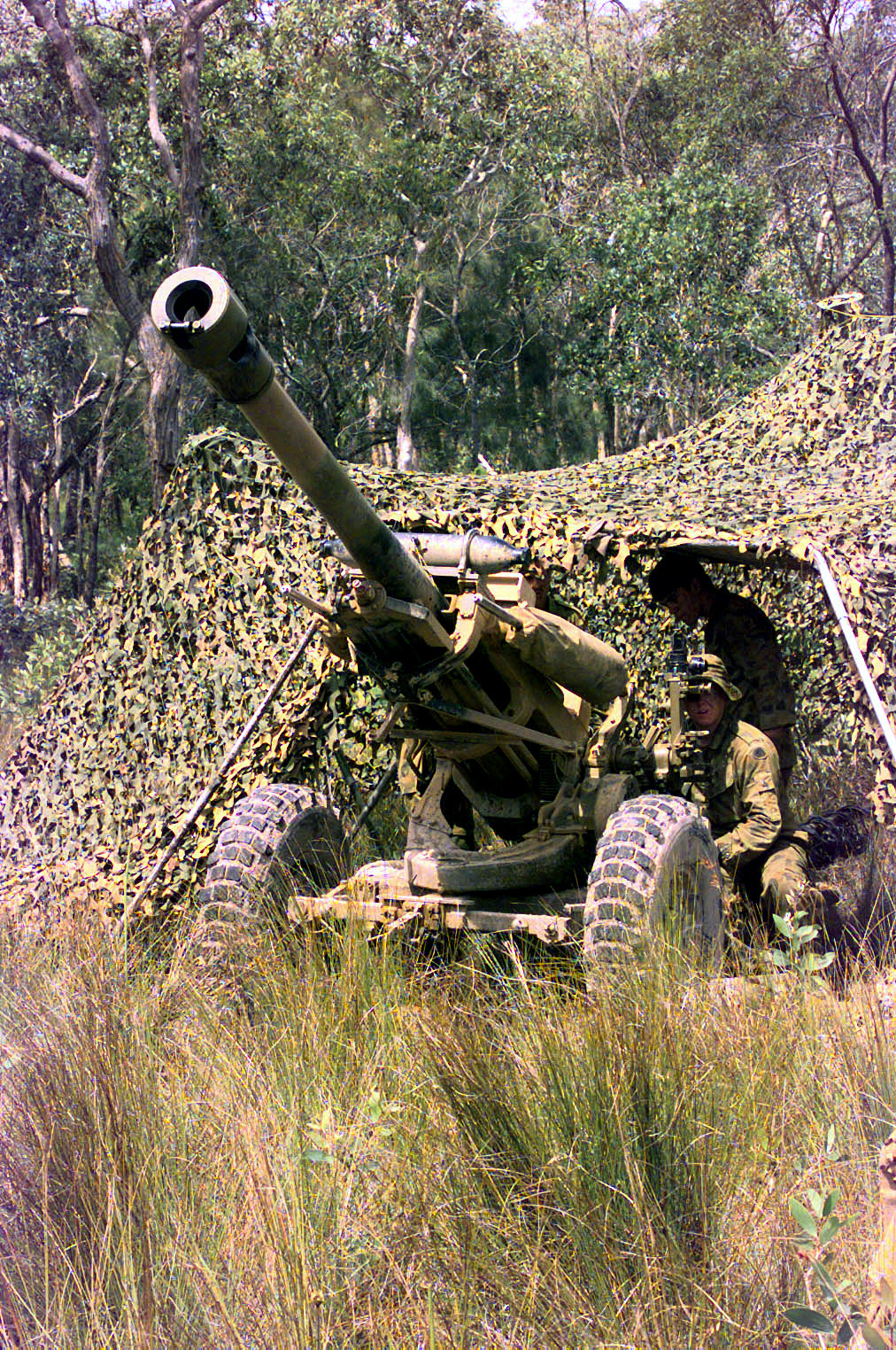
A 1st Field Regiment L119 Field Gun in 1999

In February 1983, the Regiment was relocated to its current base at Barce Lines, Gallipoli Barracks, Enoggera. In November 1985, the Regiment was integrated with the Army Reserve resulting in the re-raising of 104th Field Battery as an Army Reserve battery on 8 November 1985.

As part of the restructuring of the Army (RTA) program, 1st Field Regiment took command of 13th Field Battery on 1 May 1997 and amalgamated with 11th Field Regiment on 15 June 1997. As part of the RTA motorised Battalion trial, 101st Field Battery, to be known as Fire Support Company, was placed under command of 6 RAR on 1 July 1997. In November 1999, Fire Support Company 6 RAR was disbanded, with the former 101st Field Battery members joining 105th Field Battery in anticipation of deployment on operations in East Timor. Although the entire sub-unit did not deploy to East Timor with 6 RAR Battalion Group in April 2000, many 1st Field Regiment members did deploy to East Timor with various units and distinguished themselves during their operational tour.

In January 2011 the Australian Regular Army field regiments were reorganised in preparation for re-equipment with new guns and battle management systems to each contain three observation post batteries, supported by a single gun battery equipped with 12 guns. As part of this reorganisation the regiments were renamed, with the word "field" removed from their title. Under the new structure each regiment is capable of providing a brigade-level Joint Fires and Effects Coordination Centre (JFEEC) and every observation post battery provides a battle group JFECC as well as three combat team joint fires teams. Every gun battery now comprises three troops of 155 mm towed howitzers.

Under the Land 17 project in 2011 1st Regiment received 8 M777A2 lightweight towed howitzers to replace its L119 field guns and M198 howitzers, and the Advanced Field Artillery Tactical Data System (AFATDS), which is a fully automated digital battle-management system. In early 2012 it took delivery of the Digital Terminal Control System for observation post batteries. The regiment is currently based at Barce Lines, Gallipoli Barracks, Enoggera. In 2018, members of the Regiment deployed to Iraq on Operation Okra as a part of Task Group Taji VIII.

== Current formation ==
- Operations Support Battery
- 104 Battery
- 105 Battery
- A Battery
- Combat Service Support Battery
- 1st Regiment RAA Band
