= 35th Field Artillery Regiment =

US military unit

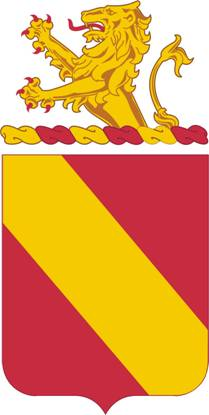
- 35th Field Artillery Regiment coat of arms
- Country: United States
- Branch: Army
- Type: Field artillery
- Motto(s): En Avant Toujours (Forward Always)
- Branch color: Scarlet
- Engagements: Vietnam War; Battle of Long Tan

Insignia
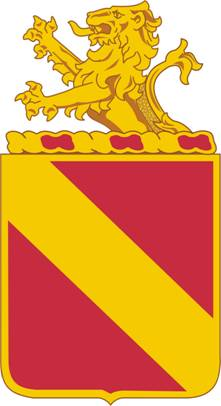
- Distinctive unit insignia

The 35th Field Artillery Regiment is a field artillery regiment of the United States Army.

== History ==
The 2d Battalion, 35th Artillery (155mm Howitzer, Self-Propelled) arrived in Vietnam on 17 June 1966 from Fort Carson, Colorado. It was a self-propelled M109 155 mm howitzer battalion and was first stationed at Xuan Loc with the 23d Artillery Group. While at Xuan Loc, the battalion was placed under the 54th Artillery Group. From 1966 A Battery 2/35th was located at the 1st Australian Task Force base at Nui Dat, Phước Tuy Province and supported Australian and New Zealand operations in the region. In April 1970 the battery was moved to Long Binh, where it remained until leaving Vietnam on 13 March 1971. (Source: Vietnam Order of Battle by Shelby Stanton, 1987.)

The battalion supported Company D, 6th Battalion, Royal Australian Regiment on 18 August 1966 in what became known as the Battle of Long Tan.

== Distinctive unit insignia ==
- Description

A gold color metal and enamel device 1 1/8 inches (2.9 cm) in height overall consisting of the shield and crest of the coat of arms.

- Symbolism

The shield is red with a diagonal band in gold, representative of Field Artillery and honorable service. The crest denotes courage and willingness to defend the country.

- Background

The distinctive unit insignia was originally approved for the 35th Field Artillery Regiment on 1 April 1933. It was redesignated for the 517th Field Artillery Battalion on 15 August 1949. It was redesignated for the 35th Artillery Regiment on 4 November 1958. It was redesignated for the 35th Field Artillery Regiment on 1 September 1971.

== Coat of arms ==
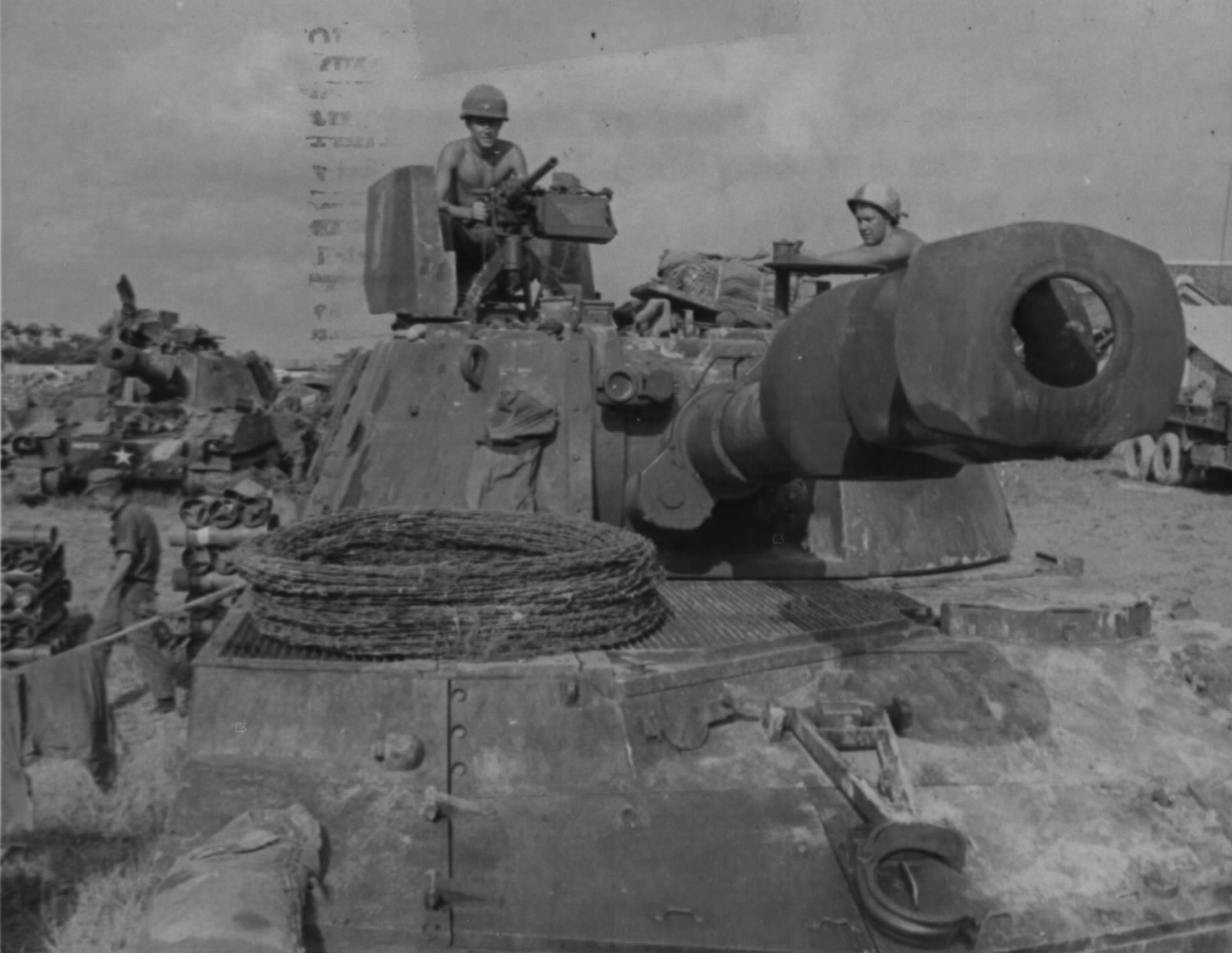
M109 howitzers from the 2nd Battalion, 35th Artillery at Dong Tam Base Camp, 2 August 1967

- Blazon
- Shield

Gules, a bend Or.

- Crest

On a wreath of the colors Or and Gules, a demi-lion rampant Or. Motto EN AVANT TOUJOURS (Forward Always).

  - Symbolism
- Shield

The shield is red with a diagonal band in gold, representative of Field Artillery and honorable service.

- Crest

The crest denotes courage and willingness to defend the country.

- Background

The coat of arms was originally approved for the 35th Field Artillery Regiment on 24 September 1932. It was amended to correct the motto on 29 September 1932. It was redesignated for the 517th Field Artillery Battalion on 15 August 1949. It was redesignated for the 35th Artillery Regiment on 4 November 1958. It was redesignated for the 35th Field Artillery Regiment on 1 September 1971.

== Current configuration ==
- 1st Battalion 35th Field Artillery Regiment (United States)
- 2nd Battalion 35th Field Artillery Regiment (United States)
- 3rd Battalion 35th Field Artillery Regiment (United States)
- 4th Battalion 35th Field Artillery Regiment (United States)
- 5th Battalion 35th Field Artillery Regiment (United States)
- 6th Battalion 35th Field Artillery Regiment (United States)

== See also ==
- Field Artillery Branch (United States)
