= Australia in the Indonesia–Malaysia confrontation =

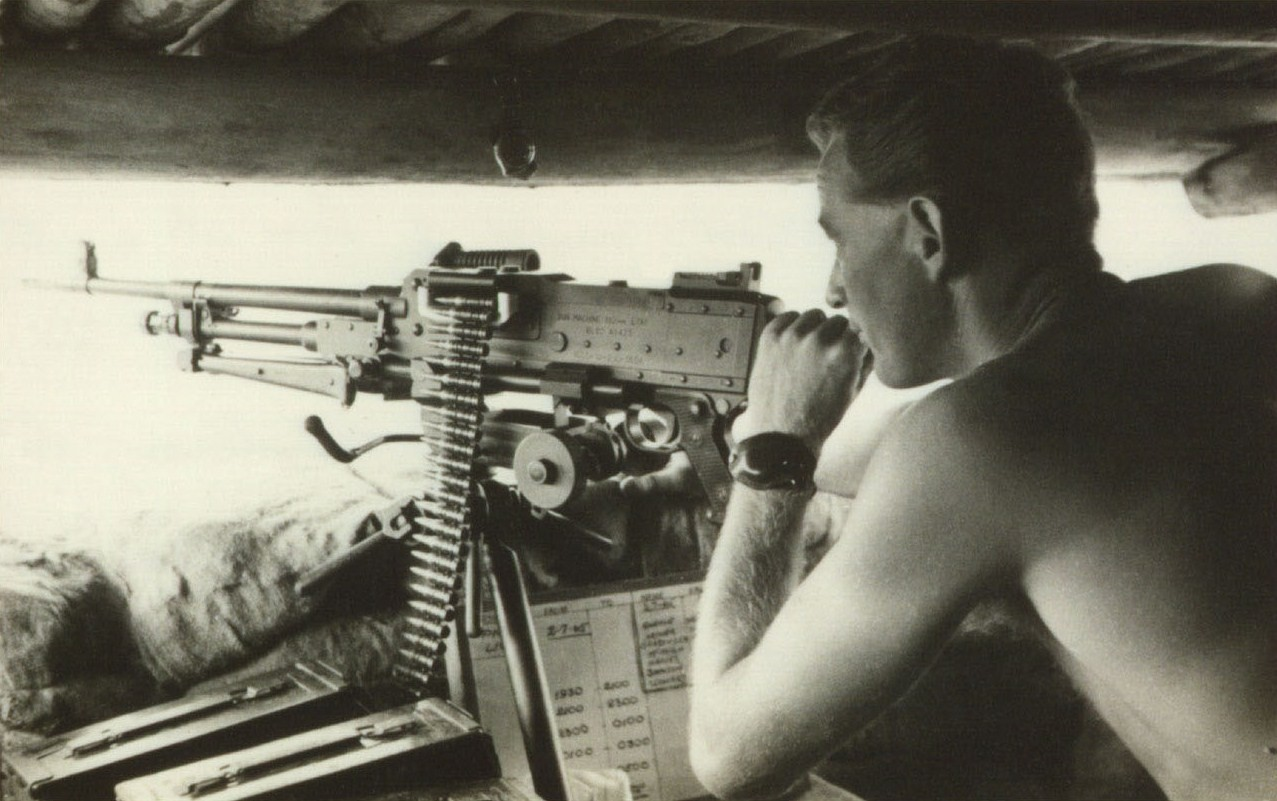
An Australian soldier manning the MAG58 machine gun while on guard duty in Borneo during 1965

The Indonesia–Malaysia confrontation (Indonesian: Konfrontasi) was fought from 1962 to 1966 between the British Commonwealth and Indonesia. Indonesia, under President Sukarno, sought to prevent the creation of the new Federation of Malaysia that emerged in 1963, whilst the British Commonwealth sought to safeguard the security of the new state. The war remained a limited one however, and was fought primarily on the island of Borneo, although a number of Indonesian seaborne and airborne incursions into the Malay Peninsula did occur. As part of Australia's continuing military commitment to the security of Malaysia, Australian army, naval and air force units were based there with the Far East Strategic Reserve, mainly in the 28th Commonwealth Infantry Brigade Group.

The Australian Government was initially reluctant to become involved in the conflict, and Australian forces did not see combat until 1964. Australia's involvement expanded in 1965, however, following repeated requests from the British Government with an Australian infantry battalion and special forces being deployed to Borneo where they were involved in a number of actions against Indonesian Army units. Other army units deployed included artillery batteries and engineers, both of which served tours in support of the infantry in Borneo. A number of RAN warships also patrolled the waters off Borneo and Malaysia to deter Indonesian infiltration parties, and were involved in shelling Indonesian positions in Borneo and in repelling infiltrators in the Singapore Strait. The RAAF played only a relatively minor role, although it would have been used far more extensively had the war escalated. (Note: A number of contingency plans existed, although none were ever fully implemented. For instance: Plan Spillikin, Plan Hemley, Plan Shalstone (renamed Mason), Plan Addington, and Plan Althorpe. These plans called for different levels of commitment depending on different contingencies, including using the majority of Australian air, land and naval forces in the Strategic Reserve, such as the Canberra bombers already based at Butterworth, as well involvement in the defence of Malaysian airspace from Indonesia attacks, air attacks on Indonesian bases by Australian aircraft flying from Australian bases and even the use of facilities in Darwin by the RAF Strategic V Bomber Force. See Dennis and Grey (1996), p. 196.)

22 Australians died during the conflict, of whom 6 were killed in action or died from combat related injuries.

== Background ==
In early 1963 the Indonesian Government adopted a policy of destabilising and ultimately breaking up Malaysia, which was to become independent of the United Kingdom in September 1963. Small parties of Indonesian Army troops disguised as Malaysian insurgents were infiltrated into Malaysian territory in Borneo to spread propaganda and conduct sabotage during 1963, and several major raids were conducted against Malaysian Army and security forces bases. More attacks were conducted in 1964, with the Indonesians expanding the conflict by openly employing regular Army units and conducting raids in peninsular Malaysia. These attacks raised the risk of a general war between Malaysia and Indonesia.

During the early 1960s Australian military units were based in Malaysia as part of the Far East Strategic Reserve and whilst Australian units had participated in the Malayan Emergency between 1948 and 1960, the Australian Government was reluctant to become involved in fighting with Indonesia. This was due at least in part to a fear that any such fighting would spread to the long and indefensible border between Indonesia and the Australian-administered Territory of Papua and New Guinea. Accordingly, several requests from the British government during 1963 and 1964 to deploy forces to Borneo were rejected.

== Ground operations ==
=== Peninsular Malaysia 1964 ===
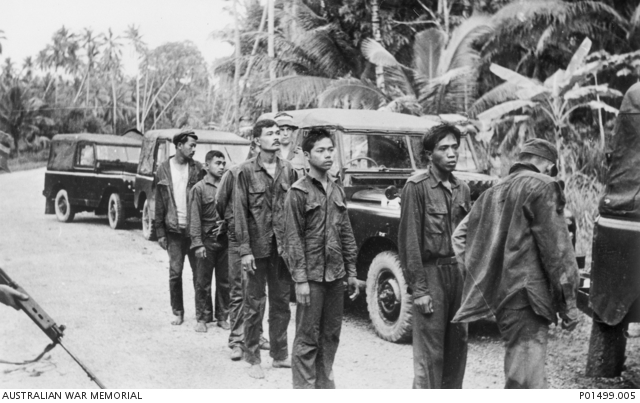
Indonesian infiltrators captured near the Kesang River by Australian troops.

Although not initially agreeing to send troops to Borneo, in April 1964 the Australian Government agreed to allow its forces to be used to protect peninsular Malaysia from attack, whilst also announcing that it would dispatch an engineer construction squadron to Borneo, while also providing two naval mine-sweepers, four helicopters and other support in addition to units already stationed in Malaysia. Meanwhile, in June the 111th Light Anti-Aircraft Battery deployed to Butterworth in northern Malaysia to defend the airfield in case the Indonesians conducted an unexpected air raid. The 3rd Battalion, Royal Australian Regiment (3 RAR), which was based at Camp Terendak in Malacca, was subsequently used to mop up two small airborne and seaborne landings near Labis and Pontian in September and October 1964. These incursions seemed to suggest a serious escalation in the conflict was imminent.

=== Borneo 1965–66 ===
Following a direct request from the Malaysian Government in January 1965, Australia agreed to deploy an infantry battalion to Borneo. Units arrived in Borneo in early 1965. 1 Squadron, Special Air Service Regiment (SASR) arrived in February and was followed by 3 RAR in March. Engineer units were also deployed to Borneo where they conducted field engineering and construction tasks, whilst artillery was also deployed. The Malaysian Government later requested a second Australian battalion, however this was declined as the army lacked the resources needed for such a deployment.

A map of Malaysia with Sarawak highlighted

During the early phases of the war, the British and Malaysian troops attempted only to control the Malaysian/Indonesian border, and to protect population centres from Indonesian attacks. However, by the time the Australian battalion had been deployed, the British had decided to take more aggressive action, crossing borders to obtain information and forcing Indonesia to remain on the defensive on their side of the border, under the codename Operation Claret. The fighting often took place in mountainous, jungle-clad terrain, and a debilitating climate. A number of features characterised military operations at this time, including the extensive use of company bases sited along the border, cross-border operations, the use of helicopters for troop movement and resupply, and the role of human and signals intelligence in helping to determine enemy movements and intentions.

3 RAR deployed to Borneo in March 1965, and served there until the end of July, conducting a number of operations on both sides of the border. During this period it was one of 12 battalions in Malaysian Borneo and operated in Sarawak as part of the West Brigade. The battalion manned defensive positions and conducted patrols to detect infiltration parties. 3 RAR also conducted 32 secret 'Claret' operations in which one or two platoon-strong parties entered Indonesian territory to ambush Indonesian forces. The battalion had four major contacts with Indonesian forces and many smaller ones—including two major ambushes on the Sungei Koemba river, another at Kindau and again at Babang between May and July—with all ending in success. These operations inflicted significant casualties on Indonesian forces and allowed 3 RAR to dominate the border area, as well as providing early warning of incursions into Sarawak and contributing to the wider success of the British-Commonwealth forces in slowly asserting control on the war. 3 RAR completed its tour in August 1965 and returned to Camp Terendak. The battalion suffered three men killed in action in two separate land mine incidents during its time in Borneo.

During its tour in Sarawak, 3 RAR had been supported by artillery from the 102nd Field Battery, Royal Australian Artillery, which also operated in support of a number of British battalions in West Brigade. The battery had deployed to Sarawak from its base at Terendak in Malaysia in late April 1965, and was attached to the British 4th Light Regiment. Operating 105 mm L5 pack howitzers, it provided indirect fire support to a number of cross-border Claret operations. In October 1965 the battery returned to Australia, and was replaced at Terendak by A Field Battery, Royal Australian Artillery, and although the latter was warned out for operations in Sarawak it was never deployed.

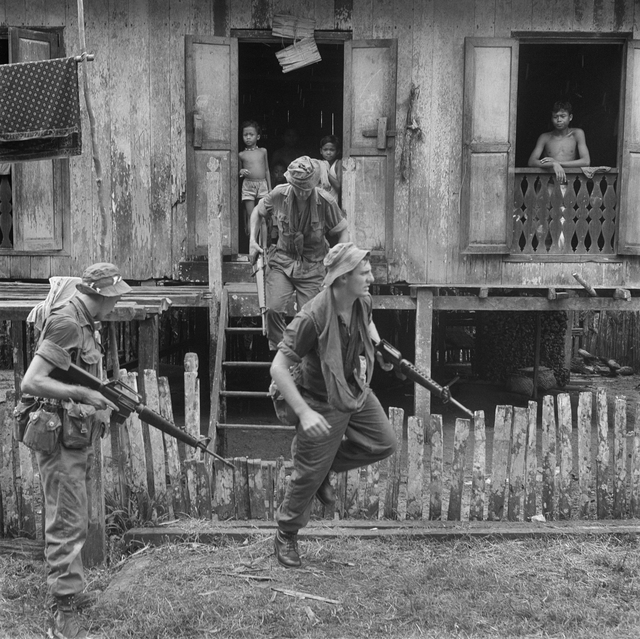
4 RAR soldiers moving through a Malaysian village near the border with Indonesia in June 1966

The 4th Battalion, Royal Australian Regiment (4 RAR) arrived in Malaysia in September 1965 to replace 3 RAR, which returned to Australia in October. After a period of training the battalion deployed to Sarawak in April 1966 where it was to operate from four company bases in the Bau area. By this time the war was winding down as peace negotiations had begun between Malaysia and Indonesia. Like 3 RAR, 4 RAR conducted cross-border operations and clashed with Indonesian forces on a number of occasions. Its tour was less eventful, however, and the battalion primarily operated in Malaysian territory where it ambushed tracks leading from the border with Indonesia. Malaysia and Indonesia agreed to a peace treaty on 11 August and 4 RAR and the other Commonwealth units in Borneo ceased operations the next day. The battalion returned to Camp Terendak on 30 August having suffered five fatalities in Borneo, though only one man had been killed in action.

Australia also deployed two SASR squadrons during the conflict, marking the regiment's operational debut. 1 Squadron conducted reconnaissance patrols in Sarawak from February to July 1965, and conducted cross-border operations between May and July. They suffered their first fatality on 2 June when Lance-Corporal Paul Denehey was gored by an elephant. 2 Squadron arrived in Borneo in January 1966 for a four-month deployment, and despite the suspension of Claret operations it also conducted reconnaissance patrols and cross-border operations, undertaking a total of 45 patrols on both sides of the border until being withdrawn in July. Two members of the squadron drowned while trying to cross a river during a patrol on 20–21 March. SASR patrols inflicted significant casualties on the Indonesians throughout the war, even though they were often tasked with covert reconnaissance.

=== New Guinea–Indonesia border ===
In addition to operations in Malaysia, Australian troops patrolled the Indonesia-Papua New Guinea border during the confrontation. These operations were conducted by the Pacific Islands Regiment (PIR), which was an Australian Army formation manned by native New Guineans and led by Australian officers and warrant officers. Although there was only one shooting incident between the PIR and Indonesian troops, a number of incursions took place and these patrols–which were often conducted in rugged terrain–placed considerable demands on Australia's already limited defence resources. The PIR was also expanded from one to two battalions in 1963 in response to the increased threat posed by Indonesia, though a third battalion authorised in 1964 was not formed. Other precautions included the construction and upgrading of a number of airfields in Papua New Guinea for use by the RAAF.

== Naval operations ==
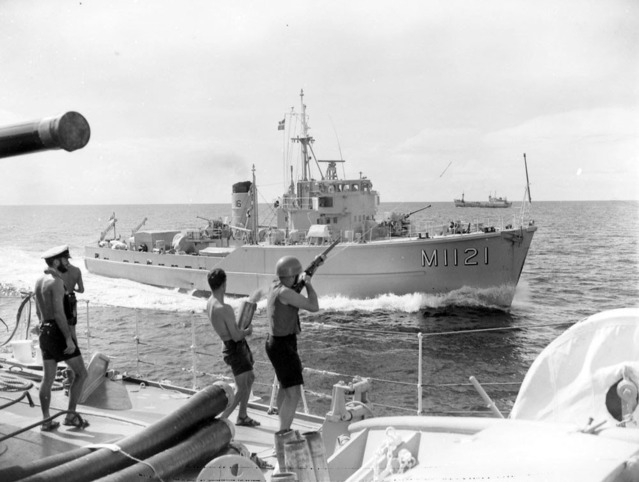
A sailor from the destroyer escort HMAS Derwent firing a line to the minesweeper HMAS Curlew while the ships were operating off Malaysia in February 1965

The Royal Australian Navy's (RAN's) involvement in the Confrontation also began in 1964. At this time two Australian destroyers or frigates were always in Malaysian waters as part of the FESR and other warships, including the aircraft carrier HMAS Melbourne, made periodic visits. The Australian warships served as part of a fleet of up to eighty warships whose mission was to defeat attempts to infiltrate Indonesian Army units by sea, provide naval gunfire support and prevent piracy.

RAN warships undertook coastal patrols in the Malacca Strait, off Singapore and the Tawau-Wallace Bay area off Sabah. The six Ton-class minesweepers of the RAN's 16th Minesweeping Squadron arrived in May 1964 and were particularly successful in these tasks. The patrol operations were generally uneventful as contact was rarely made with Indonesian forces. Minesweeper HMAS Teal exchanged fire with an Indonesian vessel near Singapore on 13 December 1964, with the vessel surrendering after three of the seven Indonesians on board were killed. She captured another Indonesian ship carrying nine armed infiltrators in the Malacca Strait on 23 February 1965. HMAS Hawk was attacked by an Indonesian shore battery while operating within Singapore territorial waters on 13 March 1966.

Twelve RAN warships served in Malaysian waters during Australia's involvement in the Confrontation, with several performing more than one tour of duty. One Australian sailor was wounded in action during the Confrontation and two died as a result of sickness or accidents.

== Air operations ==
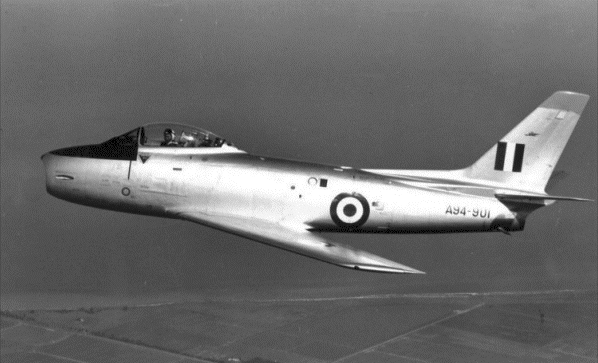
An RAAF CAC-27 Sabre

The RAAF was also involved in the Indonesia-Malaysia Confrontation. During the 1960s four Australian flying squadrons were based at RAAF Base Butterworth in Malaysia as part of the FESR. The largest unit was No. 78 Wing RAAF, which comprised the Sabre-equipped No. 3 Squadron and No. 77 Squadron. The other flying units were No. 2 Squadron, which operated Canberra bombers and a small number of Dakota transports, and the UH-1 Iroquois-equipped No. 5 Squadron. No. 78 Wing and No. 2 Squadron had been based at Butterworth since 1958 and No. 5 Squadron arrived in 1964 in response to one of the Malaysian Government's requests for assistance.

No. 78 Wing made an important contribution to the defence of Malaysian airspace during the confrontation. It provided two of the three fighter squadrons in Malaysia at the time (the third being a Royal Air Force (RAF) unit equipped with Javelin interceptors based at RAF Tengah) and increased its readiness levels as the Confrontation expanded. On 17 July 1963 Australian Sabres sighted Indonesian Air Force MiG-19s near the Malaysian coast and tracked one of them back towards its base at Medan in North Sumatra. From October 1963 the wing kept two Sabres armed with Sidewinder missiles and cannons on alert at Butterworth during daylight hours. No. 2 Squadron also planned attacks on targets in Java and practiced strikes against Indonesia. Restrictive rules of engagement were initially in place, however, and Indonesian aircraft could only be engaged if they were either declared 'hostile' by the air defence commander or had first attacked a target in Malaysia or Singapore.

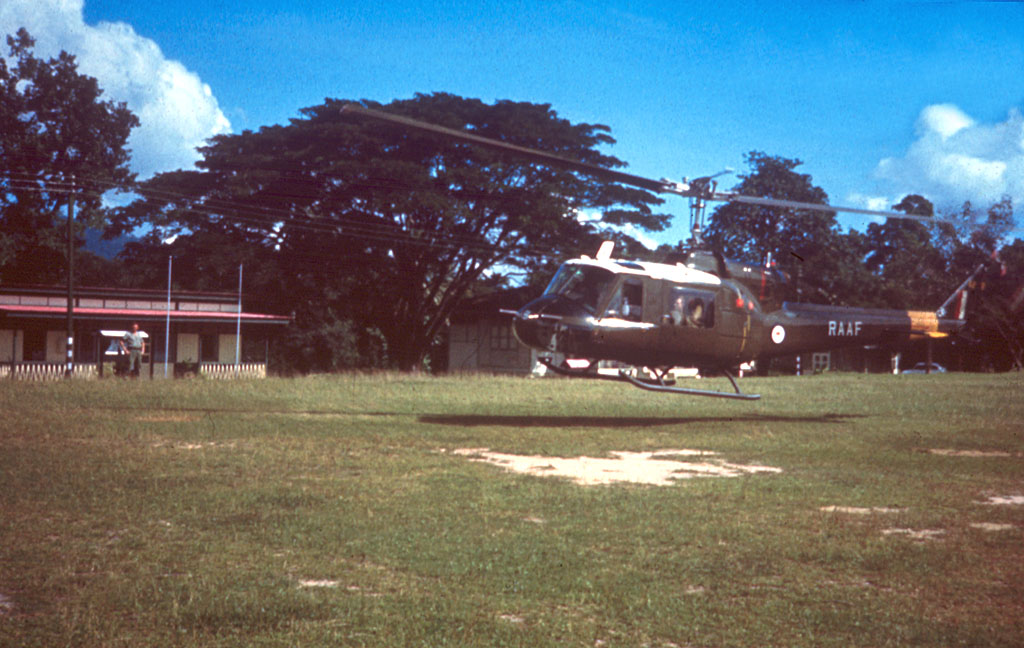
A RAAF UH-1 Iroquois landing at Camp Terendak in 1964

The landing of paratroopers in Johore during September 1964 caused an increase in tensions. Under 'Plan Addington' RAF V bombers were to be based at RAAF Base Darwin in northern Australia to strike Indonesian aerial facilities if targets in Malaysia were attacked. When the Australian Government became concerned that the parachute landings could lead to open hostilities it ordered the RAAF to deploy 16 Sabres from No. 76 Squadron, which was based RAAF Base Williamtown, to Darwin. The goal of this deployment was to protect Darwin against raids from Indonesian Il-28 bombers in the event of war. An Army anti-aircraft battery was also deployed to Darwin and additional Sabre pilots and ground crew were sent to Butterworth to reinforce No. 78 Wing. (Note: In case of an Indonesian air attack, the 121st Light Anti-Aircraft Battery—a reserve unit of the Citizen Military Forces (CMF)—had been formed in Darwin during this time, see Horner (1995), p. 499. Darwin's air defences were further strengthened in June 1965 following the deployment of a detachment of Bloodhound missiles operated by No. 30 Squadron RAAF, see Barnes (2000), p. 122.) The Sabres arrived on 8 September and were maintained at a high level of alert until 17 October. After international tensions eased No. 76 Squadron began returning to Williamstown on 20 October. The rules of engagement for the Australian fighters in Malaysia were loosened as a result of the landing in Johore to allow any Indonesian aircraft which could be positively identified as being within Malaysian or Singapore airspace to be destroyed.

RAAF aircraft also supported ground operations during the Confrontation. No. 5 Squadron's activities between 1964 and 1966 included transporting Australian, Malaysian and Singapore troops during operations against Indonesian infiltrators in peninsular Malaysia. RAAF aircraft also routinely transported troops and supplies between peninsular Malaysia and Borneo. Australian C-130 Hercules made regular courier flights between Darwin and Butterworth, though Indonesia withdrew permission for these aircraft to fly through its airspace in July 1964. A detachment of No. 78 Wing Sabres began operations at Labuan island off Borneo in September 1965 to improve the RAF's air defences in the region. The alert status for aircraft at Butterworth was reduced at the end of the confrontation and Indonesia again routinely allowed Australian aircraft to transit its airspace. Between 1969 and 1972 Australia donated Sabre aircraft, as well as technical support and training, to both the Indonesian and Malaysian air forces.

== Aftermath ==
Following a military coup in Indonesia in early 1966 which brought General Suharto to power Malaysia and Indonesia signed a peace treaty in Bangkok in August 1966, ending the conflict. Australian forces in Malaysia then reverted to their primary role in the FESR.

Operations in Borneo—especially cross-border missions, which were never admitted during the war—were extremely sensitive and for these reasons they received little press coverage in Australia. Due to the conflict's sensitivity, the editor of the Australian official history of Australia's involvement in South East Asian conflicts, Peter Edwards, had to persuade the government to have the Confrontation included in the series. Official acknowledgement of Australian involvement in Claret missions only occurred in 1996 when Cabinet papers discussing the operations were released.

The Australian Army units in Borneo were successful, but played only a secondary role in the fighting. Regardless the conflict provided useful experience which help the Army to prepare for the much higher-intensity fighting it would experience in Vietnam. The Navy also gained valuable experience in coastal patrol operations. 3,500 Australians served during Confrontation and casualties included 23 dead, including seven killed in action – while another eight were wounded.

A ceremony on 24 March 2014 was conducted in Sydney, New South Wales to mark the 50th anniversary of Australian involvement in the conflict.

== Timeline ==
1964	September/October – Australian troops from 3rd Battalion, Royal Australian Regiment (3RAR) are used to help mop up Indonesian infiltrators from seaborne and airborne incursions at Labis and Pontian on the Malayan Peninsula.; 13 December – HMAS Teal is engaged by a vessel in the Singapore Strait by Indonesian infiltrators. Return fire from the Australian ship killed three, whilst four other Indonesians were subsequently captured.
1965	March – 3RAR deploys to Borneo.; 27 May – two Australian platoons conduct an ambush across the border along the Sungei Koemba river in Kalimantan as part of Operation Claret. In a highly successful operation as many as 23 Indonesians were killed, for no loss to the Australians.; 2 June – Lance Corporal Paul Denehey is gored by an elephant during an SASR patrol into Indonesian Kalimantan and died several days later before he could be evacuated.; 12 June – a second 3RAR ambush further downstream on the Sungei Koemba results in at least eight Indonesians killed, again for no loss.; 15 June – Australian troops from 3RAR successfully ambushed a large Indonesian force up to 100 strong inside Indonesian territory at Kindau, before withdrawing under the cover of artillery fire. Two Australians were wounded, while later estimates put Indonesian losses at 50 killed.; 5 July – an Australian SASR patrol on the Indonesian airfield at Long Bawan in Kalimantan is contacted in a chance encounter. Two Indonesians are killed and the patrol is forced to withdraw.; 5 July – another four-man SASR patrol monitoring traffice on the Sungei Selalir river near Talisoi engaged a party of Indonesians in a longboat, killing seven and wounding another two.; 12 July – a platoon sized Indonesian force is ambushed by a platoon from 3RAR at Babang, in Kalimantan. The Indonesians counter-attacked and the Australians withdrew under the cover of defensive artillery fire. At least 13 Indonesians were killed and five wounded, while the Australians suffered no losses.; 21 July – Concentrating on the Sungei Selalir as a major Indonesian logistic route, a 10-man SASR patrol ambushes another boat carrying Indonesian soldiers, killing all six occupants. The Australians broke contact and despite a follow-up by Indonesian patrols they are successfully extracted on 25 July.
1966	April – 4 RAR arrives in Borneo.; 21 March – Lieutenant Kenneth Hudson and Private Robert Moncrieff drown after their SASR patrol attempts to cross a swollen stretch of the Sungei Sekayan in order to monitor Indonesian movements around Kampong Entabang, across the border. Their remains were found 44 years later on 17 March 2010.; 23 May – An SASR patrol on the Sungei Poeteh river contacts a canoe carrying five Indonesians, killing or wounding them all in a chance encounter. The patrol subsequently withdraws.; 15 June – In a sharp skirmish 4 miles (6.4 km) north-west of the company base at Stass a patrol from 4RAR clashes with a group of Indonesians inside Malaysian Borneo. Four Indonesians were killed, while two Australians were wounded. One Australian later died of wounds.

== See also ==
- Order of battle during Indonesia-Malaysia confrontation
