= Battle of Sungei Koemba =

Part of the Indonesia–Malaysia confrontation

- Part of the Indonesia–Malaysia confrontation
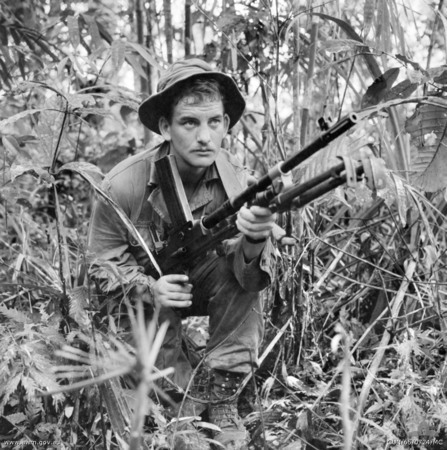
- An Australian soldier from 3RAR with an L4A4 Bren light machine-gun, on patrol near the Sarawak-Kalimantan border, 1965.
Date	27 May – 12 June 1965
Location	Sungei Koemba river, Kalimantan (Indonesian Borneo)
Result	Australian victory

Belligerents
Australia; Supported by: Malaysia	Indonesia

Commanders and leaders
(Australia) William Broderick; (Australia) Ivor Hodgkinson; (Malaysia) Tunku Osman	(Indonesia) Unknown

Units involved
(Australia) 3 RAR	(Indonesia) 440 Battalion

Strength
~120	Unknown

Casualties and losses
2 wounded	~31 killed

The Battle of Sungei Koemba (27 May – 12 June 1965) took place during the Indonesia–Malaysia confrontation. Involving Australian and Indonesian troops, the battle consisted of a series of ambushes launched by the 3rd Battalion, Royal Australian Regiment (3 RAR), along the Sungei Koemba river in Kalimantan (Indonesian Borneo). The ambushes were part of the wider Operation Claret which involved cross-border operations by British-Commonwealth units from bases in Sarawak, penetrating up to 10,000 yards (9,100 m) into Indonesian territory with the aim of disrupting the movement and resupply of Indonesian forces and to keep them off balance.

The first ambush was conducted by two platoons from B Company on 27 May 1965 and resulted in significant Indonesian casualties, for no loss to the Australians. The second ambush was conducted a fortnight later and was set a little further downstream from the last one, this time by a platoon from C Company, occurring on 12 June 1965 and again resulting in heavy Indonesian casualties for no loss to the Australians.

== Background ==
=== Military situation ===
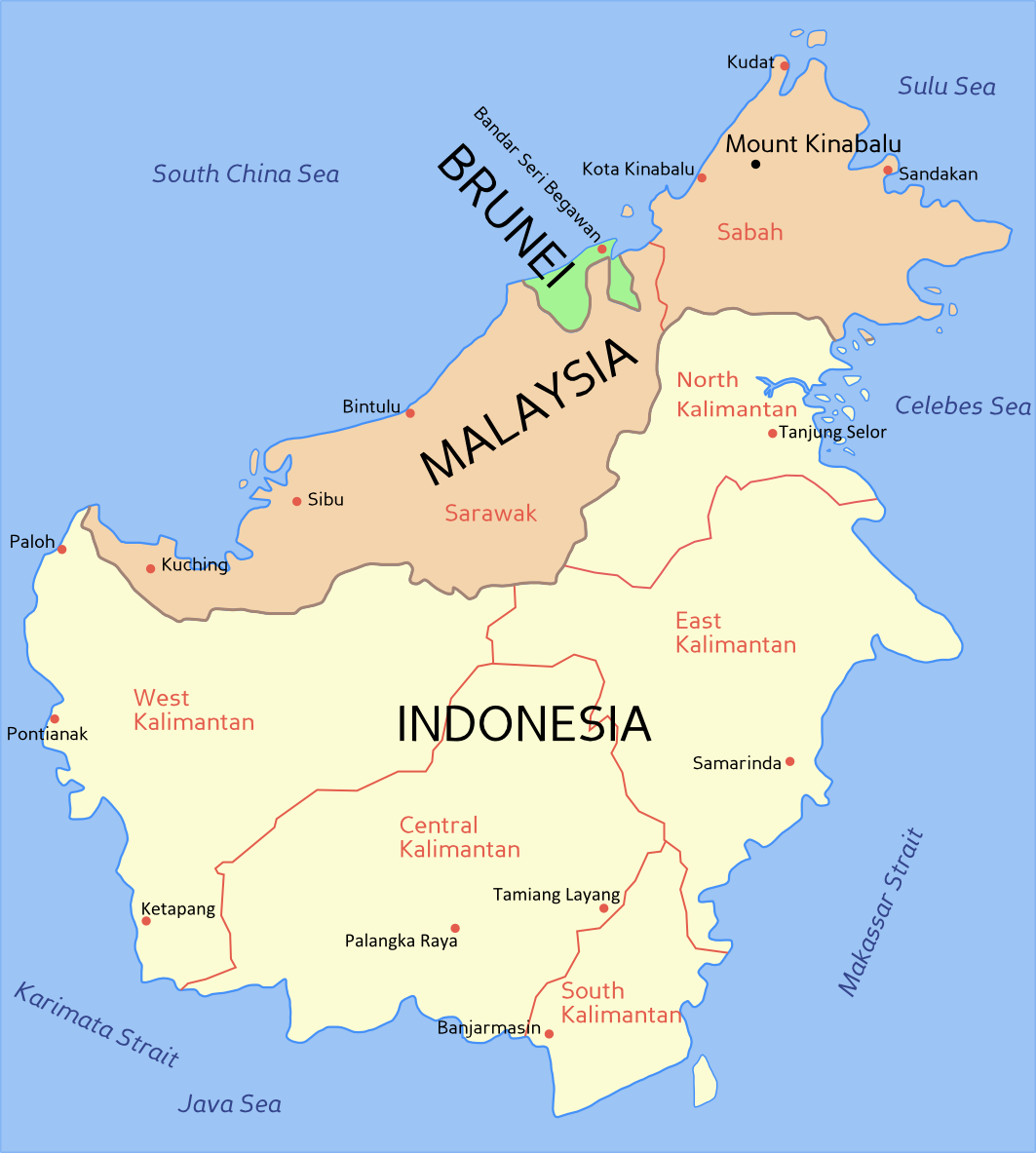
Borneo

Following Malayan independence from Britain in 1957, proposals to federate the states of Malaya, Sabah, Sarawak, Brunei, and Singapore led to tensions with Indonesia. In late-1962 the Indonesian president, Sukarno, had begun military operations in an attempt to destabilise the new state, including an attempt to seize power in the independent enclave of Brunei in December. Following the Federation of Malaysia in 1963, hostilities grew with military activity increasing along the Indonesian side of the border in Borneo, as small parties of armed men began infiltrating Malaysian territory on propaganda and sabotage missions. Carried out by Indonesian irregular "volunteers", these operations continued throughout 1963. (Note: Such organisations included the Tentara Nasional Kalimantan Utara (TNKU), Indonesian Border Terrorists (IBT) and Clandestine Communist Organisation (CCO).) However, by 1964 Indonesian regular army (TNI) units had also become involved.

Although not initially agreeing to send troops to Borneo in the opening stages of the Indonesia-Malaysia Confrontation, the Australian government did allow its forces stationed in Malaysia as part of the Far East Strategic Reserve (FESR) to be used to protect Peninsular Malaysia from Indonesian attack. 3 RAR, which was based at Camp Terendak in Malacca, was subsequently used to mop up two small airborne and seaborne landings near Labis and Pontian in September and October 1964. These incursions suggested that a major escalation in the conflict was imminent, and in January 1965 the government conceded to British and Malaysian requests, subsequently agreeing to deploy an infantry battalion to Borneo, in addition to a battery of artillery, an engineer construction squadron, and a squadron from the Special Air Service Regiment.

During the early phases, British and Malaysian troops had attempted only to control the border, and to protect population centres. However, by the time the Australian battalion deployed the British had decided on more aggressive action, crossing borders to obtain information and forcing the Indonesians to remain on the defensive, under the codename Operation Claret. The fighting took place in mountainous, jungle-clad terrain, and a debilitating climate, with operations characterised by the extensive use of company bases sited along the border, cross-border operations, the use of helicopters for troop movement and resupply, and the role of human and signals intelligence to determine Indonesian movements and intentions.

== Prelude ==
=== Opposing forces ===
As part of these operations, British-Commonwealth reconnaissance and special forces patrols frequently crossed the border into the Kalimantan in order to detect Indonesian forces about to enter Sarawak. Initially penetration was limited to 3,000 yards (2,700 m), while later it was extended to 6,000 yards (5,500 m), and yet again to 10,000 yards (9,100 m). Conventional forces were then tasked to act on this information to ambush or otherwise attack the Indonesians. Uncertain of where British-Commonwealth forces might strike next, the Indonesians were increasingly forced to devote their resources to protecting their own positions, reducing their ability to conduct offensive operations, although these continued on a much reduced scale. Given the sensitivity of Claret operations and the potential consequences if they were exposed they were controlled at the highest level, and were highly classified at the time, with the participants sworn to secrecy. When casualties were suffered they were reported as having occurred within Malaysian territory.

3 RAR formally relieved a British Army battalion, the 1/7th Gurkhas, in the Bau area of Sarawak on 22 March 1965, although they had mounted a number of familiarisation patrols inside Malaysian territory over the proceeding weeks. Joining the West Brigade, the Australians were initially deployed in a series of company bases along the border, guarding the approaches to the capital Kuching just 31 miles (50 km) away. Commanded by Lieutenant Colonel Bruce McDonald, the battalion was deployed with three of its four rifle companies forward at Stass (A Company), Bukit Knuckle (B Company) and Serikin (C Company) in order to cover the border areas, with the fourth company (D Company) remaining in reserve at Bau along with battalion headquarters. On average, each company operated on a frontage of around 7,700 yards (7,000 m). In support in West Brigade was the British 4th Light Regiment, equipped with 105-millimetre (4.1 in) L5 pack howitzers and 5.5-inch (140 mm) medium guns. Included were the guns of 102nd Field Battery, Royal Australian Artillery, which had recently been deployed to West Sarawak.

By late April the Australians began their first cross-border reconnaissance patrols. Opposing them were a number of Indonesian units, including elements of the Resimen Para Komando Angkatan Darat (RPKAD) and the Diponegoro Division, normally based in KODAM 7 in central Java. These units were among the best in the TNI. (Note: The Indonesian Army Paracommando Regiment or RPKAD, was the forerunner to Kopassus.) In April 1965 two Indonesian battalion combat teams from the 5th Brigade were deployed in the 3 RAR area of operations, designated 'H' BTP and 'J' BTP, while a third battalion, 'I' BTP, was concentrated further to the east; in total 3,050 men under the overall command of Colonel Sujono. These units were supported by at least two detachments of artillery, equipped with anti-aircraft machine-guns and 81-millimetre (3.2 in) mortars. (Note: Batalyon Tim Pertempuran (BTP) were battalion combat teams formed from sub-units from one battalion attached to another unit, the resultant unit was then designated with a letter.)

== Battle ==
=== First ambush, 27 May 1965 ===
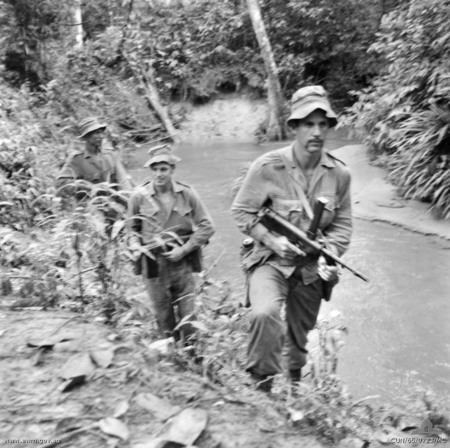
3 RAR patrolling along a stream, Borneo 1965.

The first Australian fighting patrol into Kalimantan began on 24 May with two platoons, 5 and 11 Platoons, from B Company and a forward observation party, departing the company base at Bukit Knuckle under the command of Major William Broderick. The patrol—designated Operation Article—involved an ambush patrol along the bank of the Sungei Koemba river. After several days of careful and laborious movement through the thick jungle Broderick established a patrol base on the high ground overlooking the river on 26 May and sent forward a small reconnaissance party of three men with Lieutenant Patrick Beale. The forward element subsequently detected a party of Indonesians in a re-entrant below, talking loudly and firing random shots, seemingly unaware of the proximity of the Australians and unconcerned with basic notions of security.

The following morning Broderick moved the company down the spur line in order to establish a firm base, while Beale moved 5 Platoon forward. Four 7.62 mm L4A4 Bren light machine-guns were incorporated into the patrol. The Australians encountered a track, beyond which lay the river, while to the north across a shallow creek, movement of the Indonesians could still be heard. The presence of the Indonesians so close to the Australian position made the chances of detection too great and as such no more troops were brought forward. Instead, Beale deployed his platoon into two positions, one covering the track with two Brens in order to secure it from the Indonesians in the re-entrant, as well as another position on a bend in the river. Only the sentry on the right-hand flank, Private Lawrence Jackson, could see around the bend, which narrowed to just 33 yards (30 m) at that point.

At 11:32 am, after occupying the position for only 40 minutes, motors were heard approaching along the river, with two 10-foot (3.0 m) motor boats coming into view. Each vessel contained five armed and uniformed Indonesian soldiers, including one fair haired European, who was later identified as a Dutch mercenary. The Australians had not been detected and allowed the boats to draw closer before the ambush was sprung. With the boats just 38 yards (35 m) away they opened fire, raking them with automatic fire which emptied the boats of their occupants. The first boat sank and the second drifted down stream. Two Indonesians were observed swimming for the far bank and were subsequently shot, with the other eight also killed. Unknown to the Australians, however, two more boats had been following the first two, and as the third boat rounded the bend in the river Private Jackson engaged the Indonesians, killing all five occupants from a range of just 11 yards (10 m). The fourth vessel subsequently pulled quickly to the shore out of sight of the remainder of the Australians, with Jackson engaging it with two grenades and small arms fire before his weapon jammed.

The action had lasted just two minutes to this point, yet already a party of approximately 10 Indonesians across the river began to engage the Australians with heavy automatic fire, although it was largely inaccurate. Beale ordered a withdrawal to link up with the rest of B Company, with the ambush party subsequently rejoining the rest of 5 Platoon while 11 Platoon covered their withdrawal. The forward observation officer subsequently called in a defensive artillery fire mission onto the abandoned position, reducing the volume of Indonesian fire and allowing the Australians to break contact. Shortly after an Indonesian 81-millimetre (3.2 in) mortar began to fire, dropping rounds into the jungle towards Siding, away from B Company's escape route. Elements of D Company and Support Company had been deployed so as to support the withdrawal, and the patrol subsequently recrossed the border into Sarawak without further incident, returning to Bukit Knuckle later that evening.

No Australian casualties were incurred and at least 15 Indonesians were believed to have been killed. Later that night an Indonesian radio broadcast announced that 23 Indonesian military personnel had been accidentally killed during a training exercise. Jackson was subsequently awarded the Military Medal for his "complete disregard for his own safety, [which] prevented the Indonesians from landing on the near bank and attacking the other members of the ambush. He contributed much to the overwhelming success of the engagement"; while Beale received the Military Cross for "his personal bravery, inspiring leadership, judgment and skill". Further Claret operations followed in quick succession, making June the most intensive month of the Australian battalion's tour in Borneo, and its most successful.

=== Second ambush, 12 June 1965 ===
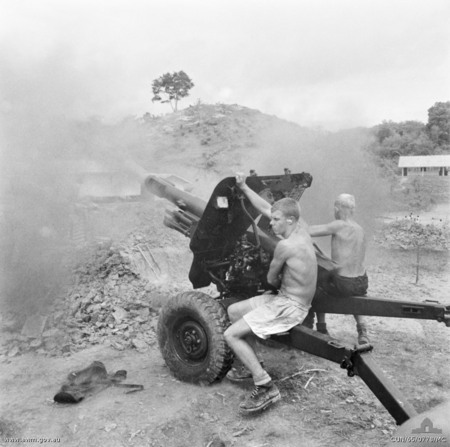
An Australian artillery crew from the 102nd Field Battery engaging a target in North Borneo with a 105 mm L5 Pack Howitzer.

On 10 June a patrol—designated Operation Faun Fare—consisting of 7 Platoon, C Company under Lieutenant Robert Guest, accompanied by the company commander Major Ivor Hodgkinson, the Intelligence Officer and a fire control party, left the company base at Serikin to mount an ambush on the Sungei Koemba river. The site of the ambush was to be a little further downstream from the successful action the previous month, being more towards the Indonesian positions at Siding. The Australian patrol occupied its intended ambush position early the next morning and proceeded to wait. During the day two boats occupied by civilians were observed and allowed to pass unhindered, as were three more the next morning.

At 10:45 am on 12 June Private Haines, a sentry on the left hand flank, warned of the approach of an Indonesian foot patrol along the river bank. The Australians had sited the ambush to engage targets on the river and were initially at a disadvantage. Ten minutes after the Indonesians were first seen, Private Sneddon, on the extreme left, engaged a group of six Indonesians with a long burst of machine-gun fire, killing two instantly and a third as he ran towards him. Haines subsequently killed a fourth, while a fifth Indonesian continued past him, followed by five others, who then engaged the Australians. The Indonesian patrol continued to advance, taking them towards the rear of the Australian positions.

Hodgkinson worked his way around to the left towards the Indonesian line of approach, subsequently engaging and killing two more, and wounding a third. Guest gathered the right hand elements of 7 Platoon, hooking around Hodgkinson and counter-attacking the remaining Indonesians, killing the previously wounded soldier and one other. Yet another wounded Indonesian was observed to crawl away while the tenth proceeded to run off unharmed back in the direction from which the patrol had come. Within twenty minutes the contact was over and the Australians proceeded to collect the discarded Indonesian weapons and equipment, including a Browning Automatic Rifle, three MI rifles and 200 rounds of ammunition. Dressed in US steel helmets, green shirts and blue and khaki shorts, the Indonesian soldiers were subsequently identified as members of 440 Battalion.

The Australians then withdrew, calling in a defensive fire artillery mission onto the abandoned ambush position in order to allow them to break contact. Later, Indonesian small arms fire was heard to emanate from the same area and a further nine rounds were called in to bombard the site. The patrol harboured for the night, recrossing the border without incident the following day and returning to Serikin. The Australians suffered no casualties, while eight Indonesians were killed and one was seriously wounded. For his leadership of C Company throughout 3 RAR's deployment, which "[brought] out those highest qualities expected of professional soldiers", Hodgkinson was appointed a Member of the Order of the British Empire on 24 May 1966.

As a consequence, the Indonesians planned to increase their activity against the Gumbang, Tringgus and Bukit Knuckle areas, while additional forces were also subsequently redeployed against Serian. In response, Australian reconnaissance patrols were increased in order to detect movement into Sarawak, and these would later result in further fighting. Perhaps in retaliation, Indonesian mortars subsequently targeted a number of Australian positions along the border, firing 13 rounds, while a further 25 rounds were fired at 11:00 am. There were no casualties.

== Aftermath ==
=== Assessment ===
In addition to inflicting significant casualties on Indonesian forces, the successful Australian ambushes on the Sungei Koemba, and later at Kindau, in May and June allowed 3 RAR to dominate the border area, while also providing early warning of Indonesian incursions into Sarawak. Following these actions Major General George Lea, the British Director of Operations, ordered a short pause in offensive operations in order to observe the effects. Indonesian mortar attacks on company bases in the 3 RAR area of operation, which had been heavy throughout May and June, ceased soon afterwards. Following the resumption of Claret operations the Australian battalion later followed this up with another profitable mission at Babang on 12 July, contributing to the wider success of the British-Commonwealth forces in slowly asserting control on the war.

Overall, Operation Claret was largely successful in gaining the initiative, inflicting significant casualties on the Indonesians and keeping them on the defensive, before being suspended late in the war. Generally British Commonwealth units on their first tour in Borneo were not allowed to undertake such audacious operations however, and consequently, although highly successful the actions of 3 RAR in their first and only tour may not have been representative of those by more experienced Gurkha and British battalions. Denied during the war, these incursions were only publicly disclosed by Britain in 1974, while the Australian government did not officially acknowledge its involvement until 1996. 3 RAR carried out 32 Claret operations in total, including 12 reconnaissance patrols and 20 ambushes or fighting patrols, although the majority never resulted in contact. In contrast, Indonesian activity was usually small-scale and aimed to challenge incursions rather than to attack them.

=== Subsequent operations ===
3 RAR completed its tour in August 1965 and returned to Camp Terendak, being relieved in West Brigade by the 2/10th Gurkhas. During its four months in Borneo the Australian battalion had suffered three men killed and five wounded, the bulk of which occurred during two separate land mine incidents. The 2/10th Gurkhas subsequently fought a number of heavy engagements against the Indonesians, including an action at Bau on 21 November 1965, during which 24 Indonesians were killed for the loss of three Gurkhas. One of the Gurkhas, Lance Corporal Rambahadur Limbu, was later awarded the Victoria Cross; the only such decoration of the conflict. Meanwhile, the 4th Battalion, Royal Australian Regiment (4 RAR) arrived in Malaysia in September 1965 to replace 3 RAR in the FESR, with the battalion returning to Australia in October. After a period of training the new battalion deployed to Sarawak in April 1966 where it also operated from a series of company bases around Bau. However, by this time the war was winding down as peace negotiations had begun between Malaysia and Indonesia, and although 4 RAR was involved in a number of contacts, its tour was less eventful.

== Notes ==
Footnotes

Citations
