= Babang =

Babang may refer to:

- Battle of Babang of 1965
- Babang Township, Sichuan, a village in Sichuan and historical name of Palpung Monastery
- Babang (Bhutan), a village in southern Bhutan

== See also ==
- Babang luksa (disambiguation)
