= Abang =

Abang may refer to:

== Places ==
- Rantau Abang (Abang region), a small village in Terengganu, Malaysia
- Tanah Abang (Abang land), subdistrict of Central Jakarta, Indonesia
- Gunung Abang (Mount Abang), a mountain part of the caldera of Mount Batur on Bali, Indonesia

== People ==
- Abang (given name)
- Abang (surname)

== Other uses ==
- Abang (orangutan)

== See also ==
- Abaiang
- Abanga (disambiguation)
- Abangan
- Abhang
- Avang, a traditional trading ship of the Ivatan people of the Philippines
- Babang (disambiguation)

Media related to Abang at Wikimedia Commons
