= Abanga =

Abanga may refer to:

- Abanga River, river in Gabon
- George Abanga (1976-2015), Ghanaian radio journalist
- West Indian term for any of several varieties of palm (plant) or its fruit

== See also ==
- Abhanga, Hindu devotional poetry
- Abang (disambiguation)
- Abangan, type of Javanese Muslim
