= Abang (surname) =

Abang is a surname. Notable people with the surname include:

- Anatole Abang (born 1996), Cameroonian footballer
- Antoine Abang (born 1941), Cameroonian boxer
- Avelina Abang (born 2003), Equatorial Guinean footballer
- Mercy Abang, Nigerian journalist

== See also ==
- Abang (disambiguation)
