= Bruce Alexander McDonald =

Australian general (1925–1993)

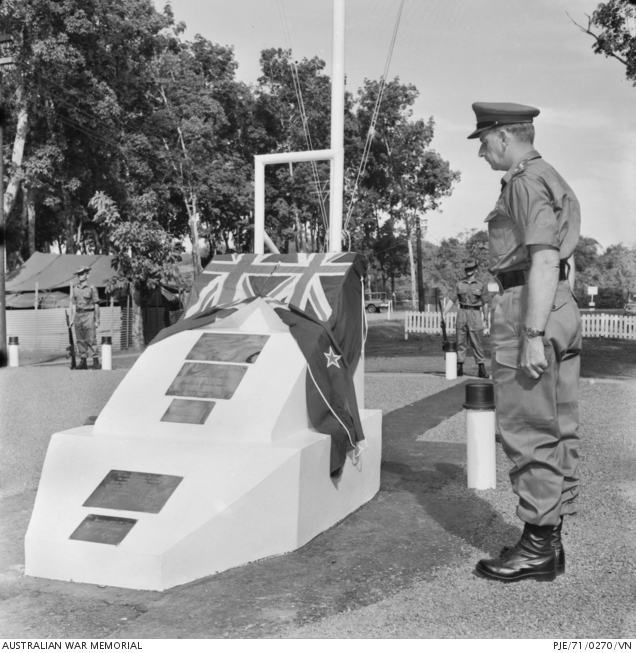
- McDonald with the RAR monument at Nui Dat, May 1971
- Born: 23 March 1925; Geelong, Victoria
- Died: 23 March 1993 (aged 68); Brisbane, Queensland
- Allegiance: Australia
- Service / branch: Australian Army
- Rank: Major General
- Commands: 1st Division (1975–77); 1st Australian Task Force (1971–72); 3rd Battalion, Royal Australian Regiment (1963–66)
- Battles / wars: Second World War; Indonesia-Malaysia Confrontation; Vietnam War
- Awards: Officer of the Order of Australia; Distinguished Service Order; Officer of the Order of the British Empire; Military Cross

Major General Bruce Alexander McDonald, AO, DSO, OBE, MC (23 March 1925 – 23 March 1993) was a senior officer in the Australian Army, seeing service in the Second World War, the Indonesia-Malaysia Confrontation and the Vietnam War.

== Early life and education ==
McDonald was born in Geelong, Victoria, on 23 March 1925, to Angus Alexander and Olive McDonald (née Penny).

== Military career ==
McDonald graduated from the Royal Military College, Duntroon in December 1944 and was posted to the 2/5th Battalion. He served in the later stages of the Second World War and was awarded a Military Cross for bravery and leadership while commanding a platoon during heavy fighting with the Japanese at Ulupu in New Guinea in July 1945, in which he was wounded.

Following the war McDonald served in a number of staff and regimental appointments. From 1963 to 1966, he commanded the 3rd Battalion, Royal Australian Regiment (3 RAR), including operations in West Malaysia in 1964 and in Borneo in 1965 during the Indonesia-Malaysia Confrontation, for which he was appointed an Officer of the Order of the British Empire. During this period 3 RAR took part in the top secret Operation Claret, executing a number of cross border actions including several highly successful ambushes against Indonesian forces.

From early 1971, McDonald commanded the 1st Australian Task Force in South Vietnam until its withdrawal in early 1972, leading the formation during counter-insurgency operations against the Viet Cong and North Vietnamese during the Vietnam War. For this service he was awarded the Distinguished Service Order. He commanded the 1st Division in Queensland from 1975 to 1977, and later served as General Officer Commanding Training Command. McDonald was appointed an Officer of the Order of Australia in 1979.

== Retirement ==
McDonald died in Brisbane, Queensland, on 23 March 1993. He was buried on 26 March 1993 in Pinnaroo cemetery, Brisbane.

== Notes ==
Military offices
Preceded by Major General Ronald Hughes	Commander 1st Division; 1975–1977	Succeeded by Major General Phillip Bennett
