= Ronald Laurence Hughes =

Australian general

- Brigadier Hughes with Paul Hasluck, the Minister for External Affairs, in South Vietnam in 1967
- Born: 17 September 1920; Adelaide, South Australia
- Died: 2 February 2003 (aged 82); Canberra, Australian Capital Territory
- Relatives: James Curnow Hughes (brother)
- Military career
- Allegiance: Australia
- Branch: Australian Army
- Service years: 1937–1977
- Rank: Major General
- Commands: 1st Division (1974–75); 1st Australian Task Force (1967–68); 6th Task Force (1966–67); 3rd Battalion, Royal Australian Regiment (1952–53); 2nd Battalion, Royal Australian Regiment (1951–52)
- Conflicts: Second World War; Korean War; Vietnam War
- Awards: Commander of the Order of the British Empire; Distinguished Service Order

Major General Ronald Laurence Hughes, CBE, DSO (17 September 1920 – 2 February 2003) was a senior infantry officer in the Australian Army, seeing service during the Second World War, the Korean War and the Vietnam War. Joining the Australian Army in 1937, after graduating from the Royal Military College, Duntroon in 1939 he served in New Guinea and Borneo during the Second World War. He commanded the 3rd Battalion, Royal Australian Regiment (3 RAR) during the static phase of the war in Korea in 1952–1953. Later, he commanded the 1st Australian Task Force (1 ATF) in South Vietnam in 1967–68, during some of the heaviest fighting of the war experienced by the Australians. He subsequently filled a number of senior command and staff positions before retiring in 1977.

== Early life ==
Hughes was born in Adelaide, South Australia, on 17 September 1920. The son of a light horseman who served in the Gallipoli and Palestine campaigns during the First World War, Hughes joined the Australian Army in 1937 and graduated from the Royal Military College, Duntroon as a lieutenant in the infantry in 1939.

== Military career ==
Following the outbreak of the Second World War, he was posted to the Darwin Mobile Force as a platoon commander in 1940 as the threat of Japanese aggression in the Pacific grew. As a regular officer in the Permanent Military Force Hughes subsequently undertook a variety of regimental, staff and training positions in 1942, including postings to Headquarters 2nd Australian Corps, the Australian Staff College and Advanced Land Headquarters, Brisbane. In 1943 Hughes was posted to Headquarters 1st Australian Corps and was involved in the amphibious landing at Nassau Bay, as a liaison officer with the American forces during the New Guinea campaign. By 1944 he was a company commander in the 2/3rd Battalion fighting the Japanese at Wewak in New Guinea, and was later involved in the amphibious landing on Tarakan in Borneo in 1945 while attached to 26th Brigade. Hughes finished the war as a major serving with the Australian Military Mission in Tokyo, in 1945–46.

Hughes was married in 1947 and he and his wife Joan later had three sons, Alan, David and Geoffrey. In 1951 he assumed command of the 2nd Battalion, Royal Australian Regiment at Puckapunyal, Victoria, which was heavily involved in training officers and soldiers as reinforcements for Australian forces fighting in Korea. In July the following year Hughes took over command of the 3rd Battalion, Royal Australian Regiment (3 RAR) in Korea, a position he filled until March 1953. His younger brother, Jim, had previously served in the battalion as a platoon commander, and had been awarded the Military Cross for his actions during the Battle of Maryang San. He too would later also reach the rank of major general. Commanding 3 RAR during the static phase of the war he believed in active patrolling, but was doubtful of the value of operations to capture Chinese prisoners and the casualties that were incurred during these missions. For his leadership which he was later awarded the Distinguished Service Order. In 1956, Hughes was posted as a student to the Joint Services Staff College in the United Kingdom, and later instructed there. In 1964 he went to Indonesia as Military Attaché during the Indonesia–Malaysia confrontation. Returning to Australia in 1966, Hughes was promoted to brigadier, taking over command of the Queensland-based 6th Task Force.

During 1967–68 Hughes commanded the 1st Australian Task Force (1 ATF) based in Phuoc Tuy Province, South Vietnam, which was involved in counter-insurgency operations against the Viet Cong. Hughes took over command from Brigadier Stuart Graham on 20 October 1967. By the second half of 1967 the Viet Cong seemed to have melted away in Phuoc Tuy Province, abandoning many of their bunker systems and avoiding the main roads and towns, causing Graham to speculate that the Viet Cong may have fled to the border, perhaps leaving the province altogether. Meanwhile, 1 ATF was reinforced, with 3 RAR arriving in December 1967 to bring the task force up to full strength with three infantry battalions supported by armour, artillery, aviation and engineers. Throughout 1968 1 ATF spent much of its time deployed away from Phuoc Tuy Province, assisting US forces countering a number of major offensives. Hughes' period in command witnessed heavy fighting during Operation Coburg (24 January − 1 March 1968), which was mounted in response to the communist Tet Offensive, and the Battle of Coral–Balmoral (12 May – 6 June 1968). For this he was subsequently made a Commander of the Order of the British Empire.

Hughes returned to Australia in October 1968. He subsequently filled the position of Director Military Operations and Plans, Army Headquarters (1970–74). In 1974 he was posted as General Officer Commanding 1st Division, a position he held until 1975. During his career he commanded a platoon, a company, a battalion, a brigade and a division. Finally, he was posted as Chief of the Reserve, Army Headquarters, before retiring in 1977.

== Later life ==
In his later life Hughes was actively involved in the Returned and Services League of Australia (RSL), the United Services Institution and the Military History Society of Australia. During his retirement he was a keen gardener and tennis player and he and Joan later travelled around Australia for six months in a caravan. Hughes died in Canberra on 2 February 2003, aged eighty-two.

== Notes ==
Military offices
Preceded by Major General Stuart Graham	Commander 1st Division; 1974–1975	Succeeded by Major General Bruce McDonald
