= Abang (given name) =

Abang is a Malaysian given name. Notable people with the name include:

- Abang Haji Abdillah (1862–1946), Malaysian politician in Sarawak
- Abang Abu Bakar, former Member of Parliament for Asajaya, Sarawak
- Abang Iskandar Abang Hashim (born 1959), Malaysian lawyer, the sixth Chief Judge of Sabah and Sarawak
- Dayang Noor Camelia Abang Khalid (born 1974), Malaysian singer and model
- Abang Abdul Rahman Johari Abang Openg (born 1950), Malaysian politician, Premier of Sarawak
- Abang Openg (1905–1969), Malaysian politician, the first Yang di-Pertua Negeri of Sarawak
- Abang Muhammad Salahuddin (1921–2022), Malaysian politician, the third Yang di-Pertua Negeri of Sarawak
- Abang Norsillmy Taha (born 1978), Bruneian retired footballer

== See also ==
- Abang (disambiguation)
