= George Abanga =

Ghanaian reporter

- Born: George Asambo; August 4, 1976
- Died: September 10, 2015 (aged 39)
- Cause of death: Gunshot
- Body discovered: Sankore-Norbekaw road in Ghana
- Resting place: Mim in the Brong-Ahafo region
- Occupation: Journalist
- Years active: Worked for Success FM for 10 years
- Employer(s): Success FM and Peace FM
- Spouse: Unidentified wife
- Children: Daughter Emefa

George Abanga, also known as King George (August 4, 1976 – September 10, 2015), was a Ghanaian reporter for the radio station Success FM, in Accra, Brong-Ahafo Region, and for Peace FM, in Goaso, Greater Accra Region. He was murdered in 2015.

== Personal ==
George Abanga was born on August 4, 1976. He had a daughter named Emefa and a wife whose name is unidentified. Abanga was murdered at age 39.

== Career ==
George Abanga began as a tailor, but later moved to radio to become a serial caller. For ten years, he was a reporter at Success FM in Goaso. He was also a correspondent for Peace FM in Accra.

Abanga's reporting could have been a factor in his murder. He had just reported issues concerning some of the cocoa farmers from Sankore. There had been theft of fertilizers in that area. He had also recently reported some regional political tensions. Police have connected some of Abanga's work to his death.

== Death ==
Location of the place where Abanga was killed in relation to the capital, Accra

On September 10, 2015, George Abanga was murdered on his drive home after reporting a theft of fertilizer in Sankore in the Brong-Ahafo Region. His attackers had the road blocked off. His left arm was shot, close to the shoulder. None of his belongings were taken, which led the investigators to believe that the murder was related to his journalist work and was not a robbery. At the time of his death, he had a wallet, containing GHS 160 in Ghanaian currency, two mobile phones, and a motorcycle. After the shooting, he was taken to the District Hospital in Goaso. He was declared dead upon arrival at the hospital.

The police issued the following statement after Abanga was killed: "We cannot suspect robbery at the moment. Also he is not around to tell us what happened; that is why we are treating this as murder." The suspect who confessed to the crime was a man in his mid-40s. Although the motive was not determined, the man confessed because he said he believed Abanga's ghost was chasing him.

== Context ==
The motive of Abanga's murderers was hard for investigators to determine. The police believed that the murder was connected to Abanga's stories about stolen fertilizers from cocoa farmers in the area. It could also have been connected to his reporting on the political problems with the President John Dramani Mahama's National Democratic Congress.

Editor at Success FM Atiewin Mohammed suspected a different story to be the reasoning behind Abanga's murder. Abanga had reported on the National Democratic Congress political party. Some of the members from Asibrem demanded the sack of some of the members of the party. This political story could have been another motive for the murder.

Abanga had also led a protest of nine followers of the National Democratic Congress. He had stated that the LESDEP planners took their money to provide them with tricycles but nothing was delivered.

Another possible explanation for his death was that the armed attackers had mistaken him for a cocoa purchaser whom they had been chasing to rob.

== Impact ==
Violence against reporters is uncommon in Ghana, which made this case unusual. Of the journalists worldwide killed in 2015, two-thirds of them were murdered as a direct result of their work. In 2015, South Sudan, Poland, and Ghana made it onto the Committee to Protect Journalists' (CPJ) killed database for the first time. George Abanga was just one of the many journalists who were killed due to their profession. The most common reporting topics that led to journalists being attacked or killed dealt with politics, then war and human rights.

== Reactions ==
The Concerned Youth of Asunafo South has stated that people have been targeted and killed while law enforcers haven't done much to investigate and catch the criminals. They have tried to spread awareness about this issue. Reminding law enforcers of this issue may help save other journalists' lives.

== His ghost haunted the killer ==
A man was said to be haunted by the ghost of Goaso-based Success FM reporter, George Abanga, popularly known as King George. The police imprisoned him due to his confession to killing George Abanga. Further investigation was conducted by the police to confirm the claim made by the man.
