= 3rd Battalion, Royal Australian Regiment =

Australian Army armoured infantry battalion

Coordinates: 19.321855°S 146.783769°E

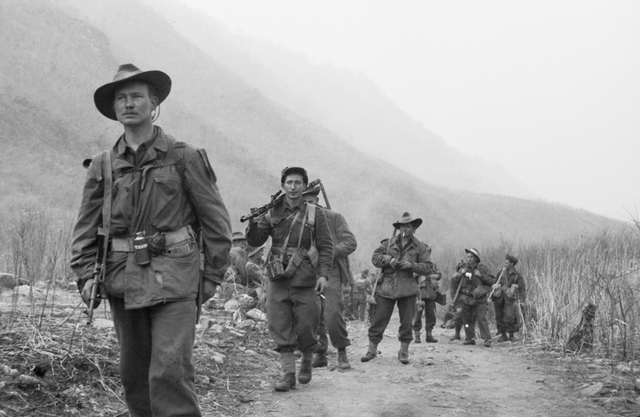
- Members of 3 RAR move forward during the Korean War in 1951
- Active: 12 October 1945 – present
- Branch: Australian Army
- Role: armoured infantry
- Part of: 3rd Brigade
- Garrison/HQ: Lavarack Barracks
- Nickname: Old Faithful
- Motto: Duty First
- March: Our Director (Band) Highland Laddie (Pipes and Drums)
- Engagements: Korean War; Malayan Emergency; Indonesia-Malaysia Confrontation; Vietnam War; East Timor; Iraq War; Operation Astute; War in Afghanistan
- Decorations: Unit Citation for Gallantry; Presidential Unit Citation (United States); Presidential Unit Citation (South Korea); Gallantry Cross Unit Citation (South Vietnam)

Commanders
- Current commander: LTCOL Dan Ellis
- Notable commanders: Charles Hercules Green; Francis Hassett

Insignia
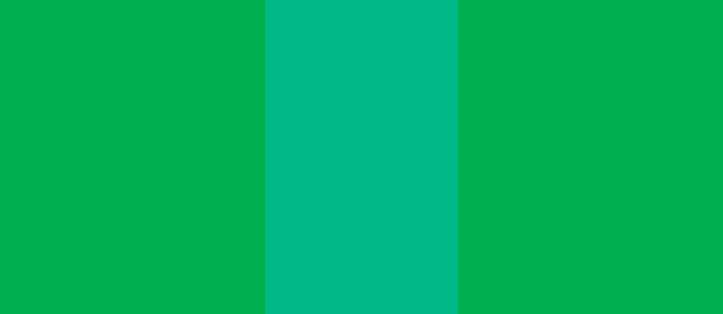
- Unit colour patch
- Tartan: Royal Stewart (Pipers kilts and plaids)

The 3rd Battalion, Royal Australian Regiment (3 RAR) is the armoured infantry battalion of the Australian Army, based in Kapyong Lines, Townsville as part of the 3rd Brigade (Armoured Amphibious). 3 RAR traces its lineage to 1945 and has seen operational service in Japan, Korea, Malaya, Borneo, South Vietnam, Rifle Company Butterworth, East Timor, the Solomon Islands, Afghanistan, and Iraq.

== History ==
=== Formation ===
3 RAR was initially formed on 20 October 1945 from volunteers from the 3rd, 6th, 7th and 11th Australian Divisions, as the 67th Battalion of the 34th Brigade (Australia) on Morotai. The battalion was intended to be part of a wider commitment for occupation duties as part of the British Commonwealth Occupation Force in Japan.

The 67th Battalion arrived in Japan as part of the Australian 34th Brigade in February 1946. As with the rest of the occupation force, the battalion did not encounter any significant resistance or civil unrest. The 67th Battalion was redesignated the 3rd Battalion of the Australian Regiment upon its formation in November 1948. The 'Royal' prefix was appended in March 1949. The Australian force in Japan was gradually downsized, with 3 RAR being the only Australian battalion left in the country at the outbreak of the Korean War.

=== Korea, 1950–1953 ===
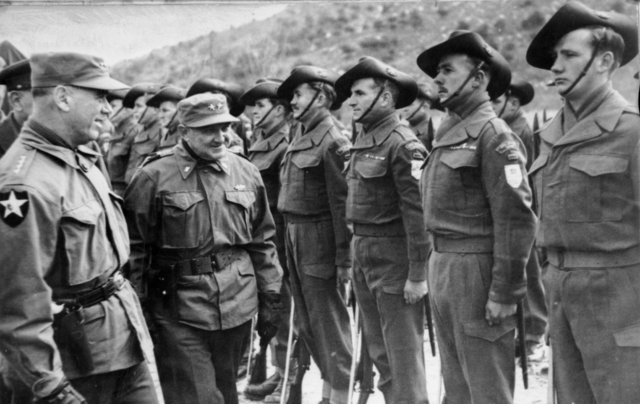
U.S. General James Van Fleet inspects members of 3 RAR after awarding a Presidential Unit Citation to the Battalion in December 1952

3 RAR was rapidly committed as Australia's main land force contribution to the United Nations forces in the Korean War. After a period of intensive training and reinforcement in Japan, the battalion arrived in South Korea in late September 1950. The battalion formed part of the 27th Commonwealth Brigade and took part in the United Nations offensive into North Korea and the subsequent retreat into South Korea following the Chinese offensive in the winter of 1950–51. In October 1950, the battalion distinguished itself at Chongju during the UN northward advance to the Yalu River. Commanded by Lieutenant Colonel Charles Green, it attacked and captured a large North Korean defensive line in a combined arms operation with tanks and artillery. Green was later killed in action. It was one of three units to receive the US Presidential Unit Citation after the Battle of Kapyong, that was fought between 22 and 25 April 1951.

In July 1951, Major Archer Denness briefly commanded 3 RAR between the departure of Lieutenant Colonel Bruce Ferguson and the arrival of the new commanding officer, Lieutenant Colonel Frank Hassett. Over the period 3–8 October 1951, 3 RAR fought the Battle of Maryang San, which is widely regarded as one of the Australian Army's greatest accomplishments of the Korean War. 3 RAR remained in Korea until November 1954, sustaining total casualties of 231 men killed. Upon its return to Australia, 3 RAR was based at Ingleburn and Holsworthy Barracks, in New South Wales.

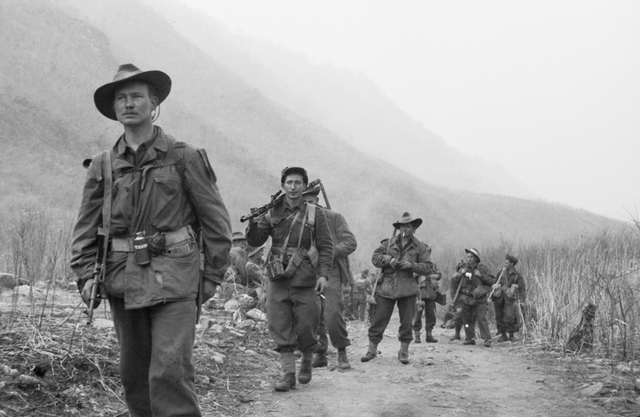
Hill 614, Korea, 1951-03-01. Led by Corporal (Cpl) Len Wright (left), members of C Company, 3rd Battalion, The Royal Australian Regiment (3RAR), move forward from Hill 614 to attack Hill 587. Cpl Wright is carrying an Owen submachine gun and has a smoke grenade and a hand grenade attached to his belt. The soldier following him, who is smoking a cigarette, is carrying a Bren gun over his shoulder. Behind him, another soldier is lighting a cigarette. Cpl Wright was a cinema projectionist in civilian life.

=== Malaya, 1957–1959 ===
The next major conflict that 3 RAR was involved in was the Malayan Emergency. The Australian Government first committed a battalion in 1955 to assist the British colonial occupation in crushing a pro-independence uprising led by the Malayan Communist Party, and their armed wing the Malayan National Liberation Army (MNLA). However, it was not until October 1957 that 3 RAR arrived in theatre; it then commenced a period of acclimatisation at the FARELF Training Centre Kota Tingi (later to become the Jungle Warfare School). 3 RAR then moved to company base camps at Kuala Kangsar (BHQ), Lasah, Sungei, Siput, Penang and Lintang. The unit was engaged in military operations against the MNLA in northern Malaya. Operations began in November 1957 and as a result many MNLA camps and food dumps were located and destroyed. 3 RAR was credited with killing 14 MNLA soldiers and was responsible for the capture of 32 others. 3 RAR casualties over the two years were two wounded and four non-battle casualties. Upon return to Australia, 3 RAR established itself at Enoggera Barracks, Brisbane. It remained there for four years during which time it carried out routine training and barracks duties and was organised on the Pentropic establishment, with five rifle companies and an enlarged headquarters.

=== Malaya and Borneo, 1963–1965 ===
3 RAR also served in Malaysia and Borneo during the Indonesia-Malaysia Confrontation and was involved in a series of highly successful cross-border missions under Operation Claret. During these operations the battalion had four major contacts with Indonesian forces on the Sungei Koemba river, at Kindau and again at Babang between May and July 1965. During these operations the battalion lost three men dead and five wounded. 3 RAR moved into Woodside Barracks, South Australia, officially occupying Kapyong Lines at Woodside, on 14 October 1965.

=== South Vietnam, 1967–1971 ===
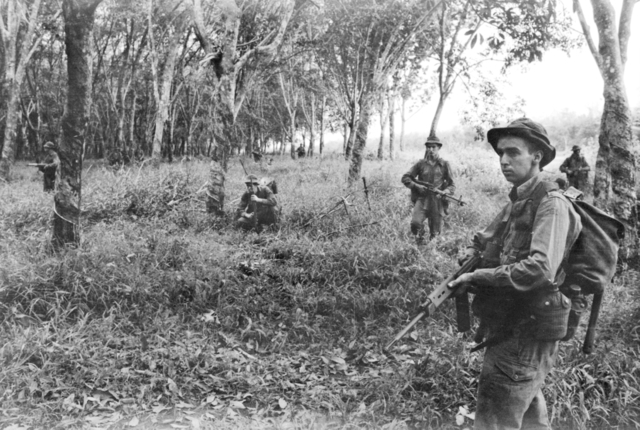
3 RAR soldiers during a January 1968 operation in South Vietnam

3 RAR served two tours in South Vietnam, the first from December 1967 with the battalion stationed in Phuoc Tuy province as part of the 1st Australian Task Force. The battalion took part in several operations and was involved in mine clearing, counter mortar and rocket tasks and reconnaissance in force operations. Between December 1967 and March 1968 Whisky Company from the Royal New Zealand Infantry Regiment was attached to 3 RAR as an additional rifle company for various phases of battalion operations. As the ready reaction force at the 1ATF base 'A' Company 3 RAR was responsible for clearing and securing the nearby provincial capital of Bà Rịa during the Tet Offensive of February 1968. The battalion was then committed to Operation Coburg in February and March. During 26–28 May 1968, 3 RAR, while stationed at FSB Balmoral in a battalion defensive position, withstood two determined assaults by regimental sized units of the North Vietnamese People's Army of Vietnam (PAVN) during the Battle of Coral–Balmoral. The battalion also played a role in Operation Toan Thang I in April–May 1968. During its first tour of Vietnam the battalion lost 24 killed and 93 wounded.

On 8 May 1970 a group of soldiers from 3 RAR who had served in South Vietnam attacked 1,000 Moratorium marchers who were peacefully protesting against the war in Adelaide. This led to 21 soldiers facing disciplinary charges, including five who had been arrested by police and also faced civil charges. The Army disciplinary heading led to at least 16 of the soldiers being fined or imprisoned for a short period. At least three of the soldiers were convicted when their cases were heard by the Adelaide Magistrate's Court; two did not receive a penalty and the other received a small fine.

On 25 February 1971 the battalion returned to Phuoc Tuy Province. By 1971 American and Australian forces in South Vietnam had reduced significantly and under President Nixon's Vietnamization program U.S and allied forces undertook the process of handing military operations back to the South Vietnamese forces. PAVN forces took this opportunity to try and re enter areas that they had been previously forced out of earlier. This included the Australian and New Zealand Tactical area of responsibility of Phuoc Tuy Province. During the second tour the battalion took part in several actions and saw fierce fighting particularly in Battle of Long Khánh against well-trained PAVN regular forces before returning to Australia by the end of 1971 after an eight-month tour. During these operations 3 RAR lost four killed and 27 wounded.

=== Parachute Role, 1983–2011 ===
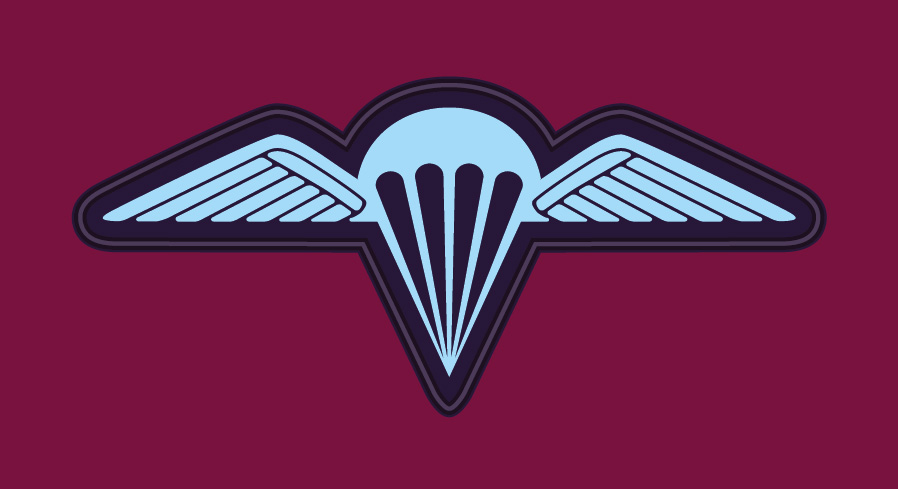
Parachute Wings badge worn on the right sleeve of 3 RAR paratroopers.

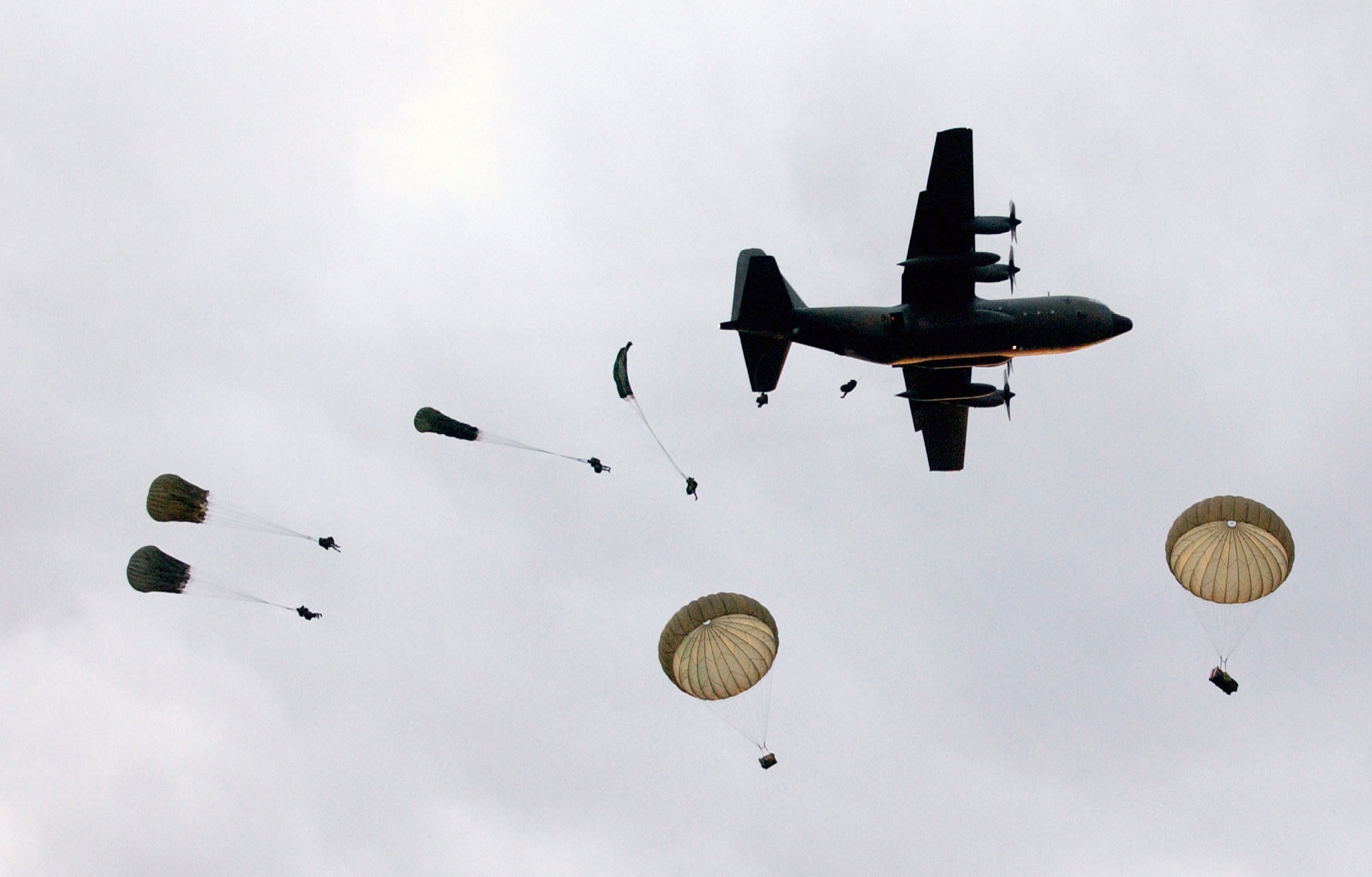
Soldiers from 3 RAR conducting a parachute jump from a C-130 Hercules cargo aircraft in 2005

A move to Holsworthy Barracks, Sydney, contemplated since returning from operations in South Vietnam, was conducted at the end of 1981. On 1 December 1983, the battalion assumed responsibility for the Australian Army's conventional parachute capability (previously, D Company 6 RAR had maintained an airborne company). In 1985, the battalion was granted permission to wear the dull Cherry beret, common to all parachute units worldwide, and to wear parachute wings identical to those worn by the 1st Australian Parachute Battalion during the Second World War.

From 1989, 3 RAR formed the main combat elements of the Parachute Battalion Group, which also included an engineer troop from 1st Field Squadron, signals detachment from 104th Signal Squadron, artillery fire support from 'A' Field Battery, 8th/12th Regiment and medical support from the 1st Parachute Surgical Team. One of three rifle companies was designated as the Parachute Company Group and maintained at high readiness for three months with another company rotated into the role. The regiment's Reconnaissance Platoon had a medium range pathfinder role trained in free-fall parachuting, including High Altitude Parachute Operations (HAPO), supported by the Special Air Service Regiment in a long range pathfinder role.

The 1st Parachute Surgical Team was raised in January 1989 to provide Level II and limited Level III medical support modelled on a British unit from the Falklands War. In 1995, 105-mm L119 Hamel guns were air dropped for the first time for 'A' Field Battery.

=== East Timor, 1999–2008 ===
3 RAR played a key role in the Australian-led International Force for East Timor (INTERFET) in 1999. The battalion arrived in Dili by sea aboard HMAS Jervis Bay and HMAS Tobruk on 21 September and was initially responsible for the city centre, before later securing the western border area in Maliana and Bobonaro. The battalion later deployed to the enclave of Oecussi where, in early 2000, it encountered the greatest level of pro-Indonesian Militia activity it had seen since the previous year. 3 RAR returned to Australia in February 2000 with some individuals extending their tour in support of 5/7 RAR. It served a second six-month tour of East Timor in 2002 under United Nations Mission of Support to East Timor. In 2020 the battalion was awarded the Theatre Honour East Timor 1999-2003.

In May 2006, the 3 RAR Battalion Group was deployed to restore order to East Timor as part of Operation Astute. An online company group was deployed at short notice in February 2007 for four months and replaced by a second company group in June 2007 for seven weeks. 3 RAR deployed again to East Timor in 2008 as the Timor Leste Battle Group (TLBG), undertaking operations to apprehend the rebels that attempted to assassinate President José Ramos-Horta.

=== Solomon Islands, 2005–2006 and 2021 ===
3 RAR deployed to the Solomon Islands on Monday 24 January 2005 to reinforce the military component of Regional Assistance Mission to Solomon Islands (RAMSI). The 3 RAR company of soldiers consisted of approximately 100 personnel to provide added support to the local and Australian Federal Police in enforcing the rule of law and restoring order in the Solomon Islands. The soldiers tent lines at RAMSI base were named the "Private Jamie Clark Lines" in March 2007 after the accidental death of Clark in March 2005. Renewed violence in March 2006 again saw a company group deploy to the capital Honiara, returning to Australia in May 2006. Civil unrest flared once again in November 2021 where elements of the battalion deployed as part of an ADF response.

=== Iraq, 2003–2007 ===
In late 2003, 3 RAR was warned to provide a company headquarters and a four-rifle-section platoon for security duties in Iraq on Operation Catalyst. A company was subsequently deployed to Baghdad from December 2003 to May 2004. It provided specific local protection to the Australian Diplomatic Mission in Baghdad as part of the Security Detachment (SECDET). On 13 April 2004 SECDET elements were involved a very successful contact when an ASLAV engaged a mortar base plate that was firing on the Green Zone. From February 2006 until March 2007 the battalion returned companies to Baghdad as SECDET IX and SECDET X. Both tours were eventful with several contacts, a rocket attack that injured four soldiers, and the accidental death of Private Jacob Kovco in April 2006—Australia's first casualty in Iraq and the subject of intense media attention. The battalion has been awarded the Theatre Honour Iraq 2003–11.

=== Afghanistan, 2003–2012 ===
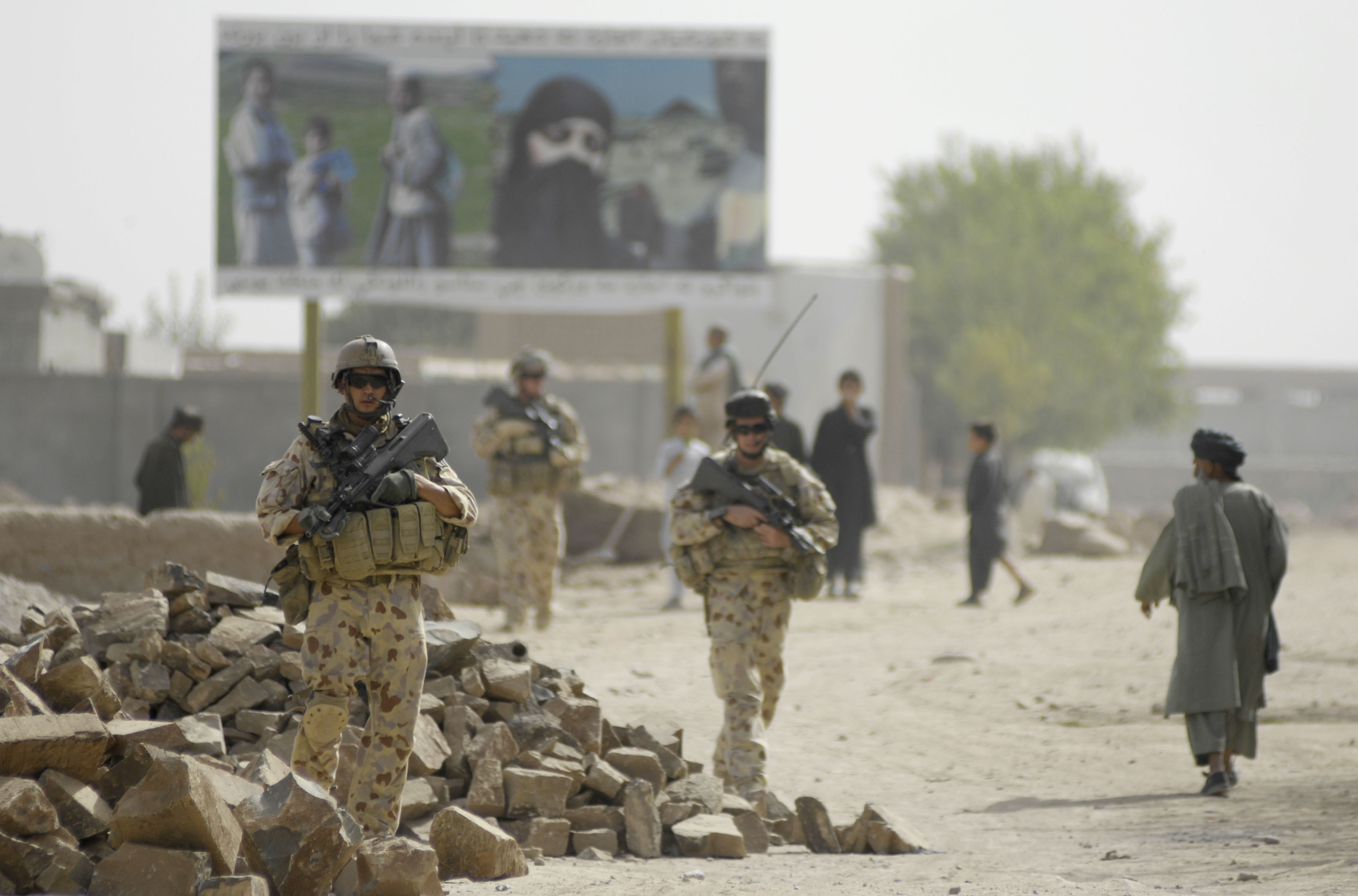
Infantry from 3 RAR patrol Tarin Kowt in August 2008 as part of Reconstruction Task Force 4

2008 saw the battalion deploy a company group to Uruzgan Province, Afghanistan as the Security Task Group (Combat Team Dagger) component of the Reconstruction Task Force 4 (RTF-4) during Operation Slipper. Highlights of the deployment include the establishment of a Patrol Base in the Baluchi Valley, and the short-notice, high-priority deployment beyond the RTF Area of Operations to construct key bridges over the Andar and Moqur Rivers in Zabul and Ghazni Provinces, along the highway connecting Kandahar and Kabul. 3 RAR formed the basis of a battle group that was deployed to the country again in 2012 tasked with mentoring the Afghan National Army 4th Brigade, 205th Corps, before handing over to 7 RAR in November.

=== Light Infantry Role, 2011–2018 ===
3 RAR was scheduled to return to Adelaide and based at RAAF Base Edinburgh to be re-rolled as a mechanised infantry battalion under the Hardened and Networked Army plan launched in 2005. It was considered that as 4 RAR (Cdo) had an integral parachute capability there was no requirement for a conventional parachute capability. In 2006, the Enhanced Land Force plan was launched with 3 RAR now to move to Townsville and re-role as a light infantry battalion. From 2006, the Parachute Battalion Group "was scaled back to a task-organised force element" the Airborne Combat Team. On 26 August 2011, the Chief of Army transferred responsibility for maintaining the Army's parachute capability from Forces Command to Special Operations Command. The additional light infantry battalion provided Forces Command with greater flexibility to develop an amphibious infantry battalion. In January 2012, the battalion relocated to Lavarack Barracks, Townsville.

=== Iraq, 2017 ===
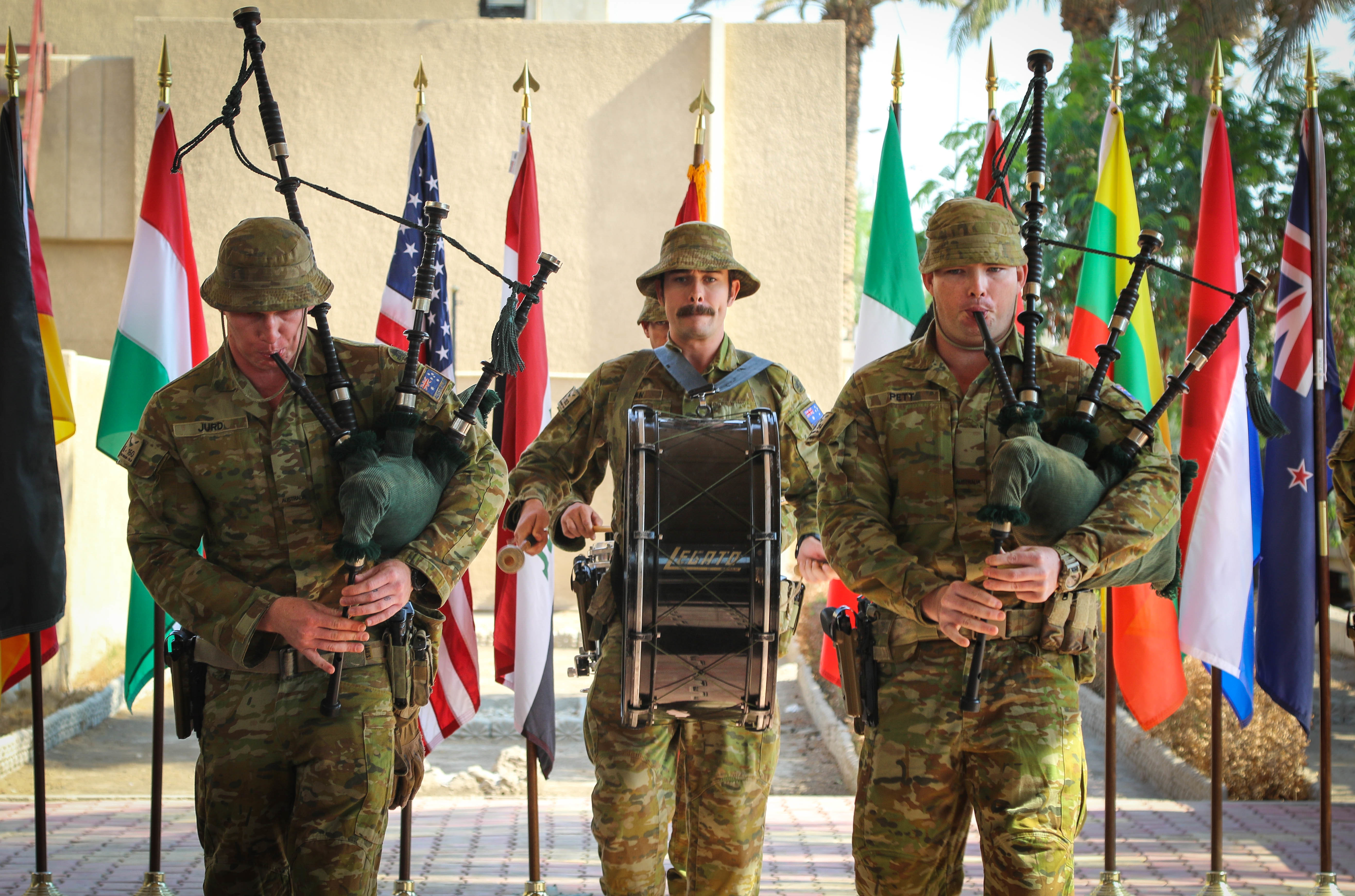
3 RAR's Pipes and Drums during a performance in Baghdad in November 2017

The battalion was warned for Operation Okra in 2017 which saw the unit's command element and Alpha Company deployed as part of the fifth rotation of Task Group Taji. This rotation was based at Camp Taji and facilitated training of the Iraqi Army in the fight against ISIS.

=== Afghanistan, 2017–2018 ===
In 2017 3 RAR deployed Bravo Company to Kabul Province, Afghanistan as part of Force Protection Element 8. FPE-8 provided security and protected mobility support for ADF elements located in the vicinity of Kabul, Afghanistan including trainers and mentors at the Afghanistan National Army Officer and the Kabul Garrison Command-Advisory Team. Following FPE-8 3RAR deployed Charlie Company on FPE-9 to relieve B-Coy.

=== Mechanised infantry role, 2018 ===
In 2017, it was announced that 3 RAR would re-role as a mechanised infantry battalion under the workforce alignment of Plan Beersheba to be equipped with M113AS4 Armoured Personnel Carriers. In February 2018, 3 RAR commenced the transition which was to occur over 18 months.

=== Solomon Islands, 2021 ===
In 2021 3 RAR deployed to help quell escalating violence in the Solomon Islands. The contingent – made up mostly of soldiers from 3RAR – joined Australian Federal Police officers and supported critical infrastructure in the capital Honiara.

=== OP Kudu and Armoured Infantry, 2025 ===
The unit was officially designated as Armoured Infantry on 28 January 2025 in preparation to receive the AS21 Redback Infantry Fighting Vehicle. Concurrently, an element deployed to the United Kingdom in early 2025 to train Armed Forces of Ukraine personnel for the defence of their homeland.

== Current composition ==
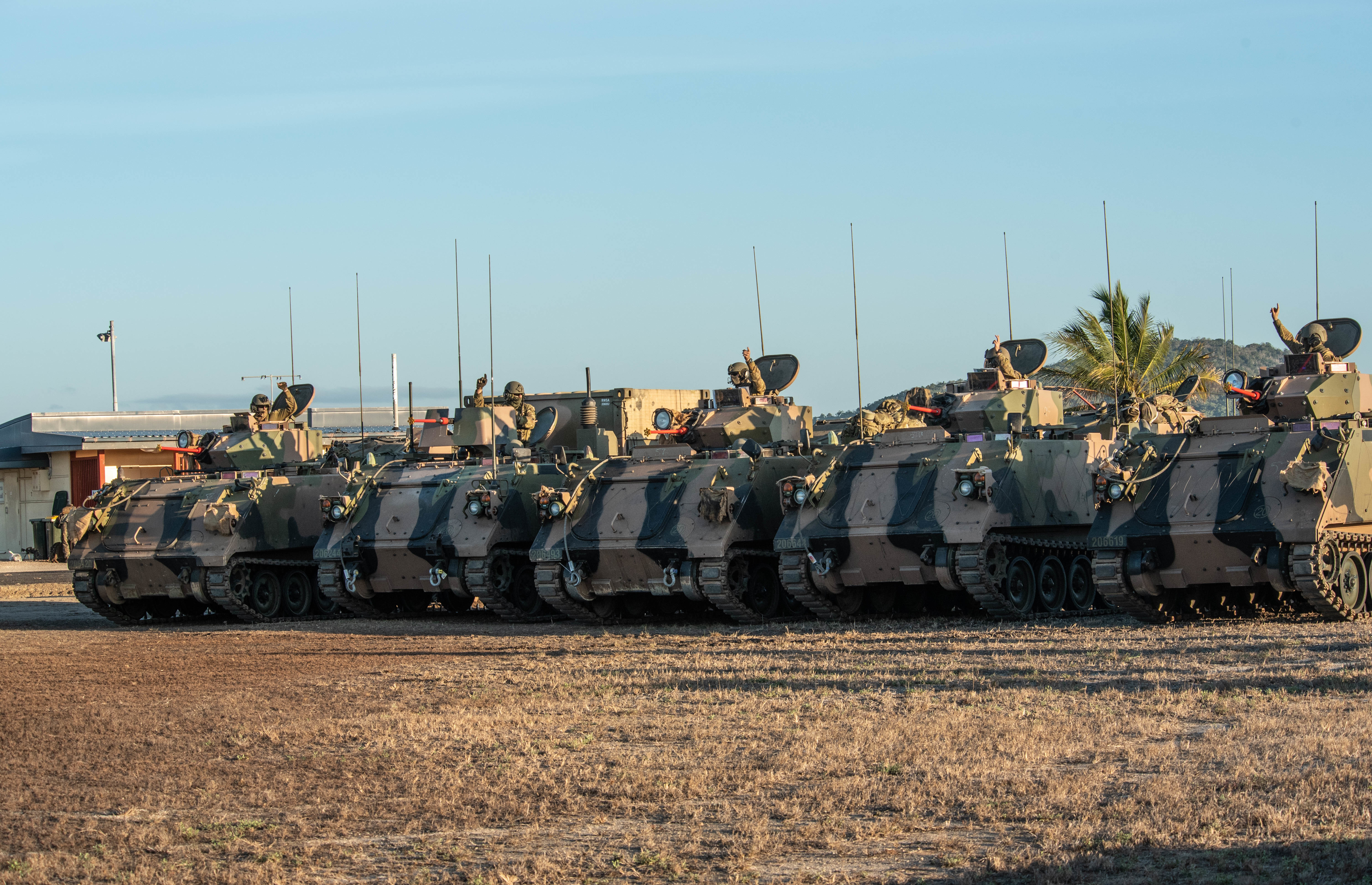
M113AS4s operated by 3 RAR in 2021

The battalion currently consists of:

- Battalion Headquarters
- 4 Rifle Companies:

Alpha Company, Bravo Company, Charlie Company, and Delta Company

- Support Company
- Armoured Logistics Company

== Battle and Theatre Honours ==
The battalion has received the following battle honours:

- Korean War: Korea 1950–1953; Pakchon; Uijongbu; Chuam-ni; Maehwa-san; Kapyong; Kowang-San; Maryang-San; Sariwon; Yongju; Chongju.
- Malaya: Malayan Emergency 1955–63
- Malaysia (Confrontation): Malaysia (Confrontation) 1964–1966
- Vietnam War: Vietnam 1965–1972; Bien-Hoa; Coral-Balmoral.
- East Timor: East Timor 1999–2003
- Iraq: Iraq 2003–11

== Commanding officers ==
The following officers have served as commanding officer of 3 RAR. Rank and honours are as at the individual's time in command.

Date commenced	Date ended	Commanding Officer
67th Australian Infantry Battalion
October 1945	March 1947	Lieutenant Colonel Donald Jackson, DSO
March 1947	August 1948	Lieutenant Colonel Thomas MacAdie, DSO
12 August 1948	22 November 1948	Lieutenant Colonel Kenneth MacKay, MBE
3rd Battalion, Royal Australian Regiment
23 November 1948	11 August 1949	Lieutenant Colonel Kenneth MacKay, MBE
12 August 1949	11 September 1950	Lieutenant Colonel Floyd Walsh
12 September 1950	30 October 1950	Lieutenant Colonel Charles Green, DSO
31 October 1950	6 November 1950	Lieutenant Colonel Floyd Walsh
6 November 1950	5 July 1951	Lieutenant Colonel I. Bruce Ferguson, DSO, MC
6 July 1951	1 July 1952	Lieutenant Colonel Frank Hassett, DSO, OBE
2 July 1952	5 March 1953	Lieutenant Colonel Ronald Hughes, DSO
9 March 1953	10 February 1954	Lieutenant Colonel Arthur MacDonald, OBE
11 February 1954	6 February 1955	Lieutenant Colonel Sydney Buckler, OBE
7 February 1955	9 September 1955	Lieutenant Colonel Robert Hay, MBE
10 September 1955	12 March 1957	Lieutenant Colonel John Watch
13 May 1957	9 November 1959	Lieutenant Colonel John White, OBE
10 March 1960	15 January 1963	Colonel William Morrow, OBE
16 January 1963	30 April 1963	Colonel Oliver David Jackson, OBE
1 May 1963	14 January 1966	Lieutenant Colonel Bruce McDonald, OBE, MC
15 January 1966	14 February 1967	Lieutenant Colonel Geoffrey Leary
15 February 1967	17 February 1969	Lieutenant Colonel Jeffrey Shelton, DSO, MC
February 1969	January 1972	Lieutenant Colonel Francis Peter Scott, DSO
January 1972	September 1973	Lieutenant Colonel Terence Sullivan, MBE
October 1973	January 1976	Lieutenant Colonel Peter Phillips, MC
January 1976	January 1978	Lieutenant Colonel Brian Howard, MC
January 1978	December 1979	Lieutenant Colonel Michael Bindley
January 1980	June 1980	Lieutenant Colonel Paul Mench
July 1980	January 1982	Lieutenant Colonel Stan Krasnoff
January 1982	13 December 1983	Lieutenant Colonel James Connolly
14 December 1983	16 January 1986	Lieutenant Colonel Kerry Gallagher
17 January 1986	December 1987	Lieutenant Colonel Peter Abigail
December 1987	December 1989	Lieutenant Colonel Simon Willis
December 1989	August 1991	Lieutenant Colonel Gordon Hill, AM
August 1991	December 1993	Lieutenant Colonel Gary Bornholt
December 1993	December 1995	Lieutenant Colonel Roger Tiller
December 1995	December 1997	Lieutenant Colonel Ross Boyd
December 1997	December 1999	Lieutenant Colonel Nicholas Welch, DSC
December 1999	December 2001	Lieutenant Colonel Peter Singh
December 2001	29 October 2003	Lieutenant Colonel Quentin Flowers, AM
30 October 2003	1 December 2005	Lieutenant Colonel Adam Findlay
2 December 2005	4 December 2007	Lieutenant Colonel Mick Mumford, CSC
5 December 2007	December 2009	Lieutenant Colonel Wade Stothart
December 2009	December 2013	Lieutenant Colonel Trent Scott
December 2013	December 2015	Lieutenant Colonel Gavin Keating
December 2015	December 2017	Lieutenant Colonel Giles Cornelia, CSM
December 2017	December 2019	Lieutenant Colonel Michael Kearns, CSM
December 2019	December 2021	Lieutenant Colonel Gerard Kearns
January 2022	January 2023	Lieutenant Colonel Christopher Johnson
January 2023	December 2024	Lieutenant Colonel Jack Westhorpe
December 2024	Present	Lieutenant Colonel Dan Ellis

== Regimental sergeant majors ==
The following warrant officers have served as the regimental sergeant major of 3 RAR. Rank and honours are as at the individual's time in appointment.

Dates	Regimental Sergeant Major
May 1950 – Feb 1951	WO1 W. Harrison, MM
Feb 1951 – May 1951	WO1 D. Ryan
May 1951 – Jul 1951	WO2 P.C. Smeaton
Jul 1951 – Nov 1951	WO2 G.E. Chinn
Nov 1951 – Sep 1952	WO1 G.L. Hart
Sep 1952 – Sep 1953	WO1 L. McCombe
Sep 1953 – Dec 1954	WO1 M. Armstrong
Dec 1954 – Mar 1955	WO2 J.B. O'Sullivan
Mar 1955 – Mar 1956	WO1 W. Adams
Mar 1956 – Mar 1957	WO1 G. Perry
Mar 1957 – Oct 1959	WO1 L.C. Griffiths
Oct 1959 – Jul 1962	WO1 J.B. O'Sullivan, MBE
Jul 1962 – Apr 1963	WO1 E. Bradley
Apr 1963 – Jun 1966	WO1 A.G. Stanley, MBE, MM
Jun 1966 – May 1969	WO1 V. Murdock
May 1969 – Feb 1972	WO1 W.J. Hill
Feb 1972 – Jan 1975	WO1 B.T. Waters, MBE
Jan 1975 – May 1976	WO1 B.W. Foster
Jun 1976 – Jan 1978	WO1 A.B. Keech
Jan 1978 – Apr 1979	WO1 N. Smith
Apr 1979 – Oct 1980	WO1 N. Huish
Oct 1980 – Jul 1981	WO1 R. Boyce
Jul 1981 – Dec 1983	WO1 M.B. Martin
Jan 1984 – Dec 1985	WO1 A.R. Francis, OAM
Jan 1986 – Dec 1987	WO1 C.N. Lee
Dec 1987 – Dec 1989	WO1 J. Selmes
Dec 1989 – Dec 1991	WO1 S.J. Walker
Dec 1991 – Dec 1993	WO1 K.E. Rundell, OAM
Dec 1993 – Dec 1995	WO1 M.A. Caughey
Jan 1996 – Dec 1998	WO1 M.D. Dunn, OAM
Jan 1999 – Dec 2000	WO1 M.J. Hill
Dec 2000 – Dec 2002	WO1 P.F. Tyrrell, OAM
Dec 2002 – Dec 2004	WO1 G.A. Cochrane, OAM
Jan 2005 – Dec 2006	WO1 G.S. McFarlane
Dec 2006 – Dec 2008	WO1 D. Welsh
Dec 2008 – Dec 2010	WO1 T. Logan
Dec 2010 – Dec 2013	WO1 Shane McPhee
Dec 2013 – Dec 2015	WO1 Andrew Shore, CSM
Dec 2015 – Dec 2017	WO1 Brad Doyle
Dec 2017 – Dec 2019	WO1 Andrew Munn
Dec 2019 – Dec 2021	WO1 Adam West, DSM
Dec 2021 – Dec 2023	WO1 Anthony Jones
Dec 2023 – Dec 2025	WO1 Jai Cosgrove
Dec 2025 – present	WO1 Jason Jackson

== Alliances ==
3 RAR holds the following alliances:

- United Kingdom – Scots Guards
- United Kingdom – The Queen's Royal Hussars (Queen's Own and Royal Irish)
- Papua New Guinea – 2nd Battalion, Royal Pacific Islands Regiment

== Affiliations ==
- Canada – 2nd Battalion Princess Patricia's Canadian Light Infantry
- 3 RAR, Pipes and Drums holds an affiliation with the Mackay and District Pipe Band (Signed 10th Dec 2022)

== See also ==
- Airborne forces of Australia
