= Serikin =

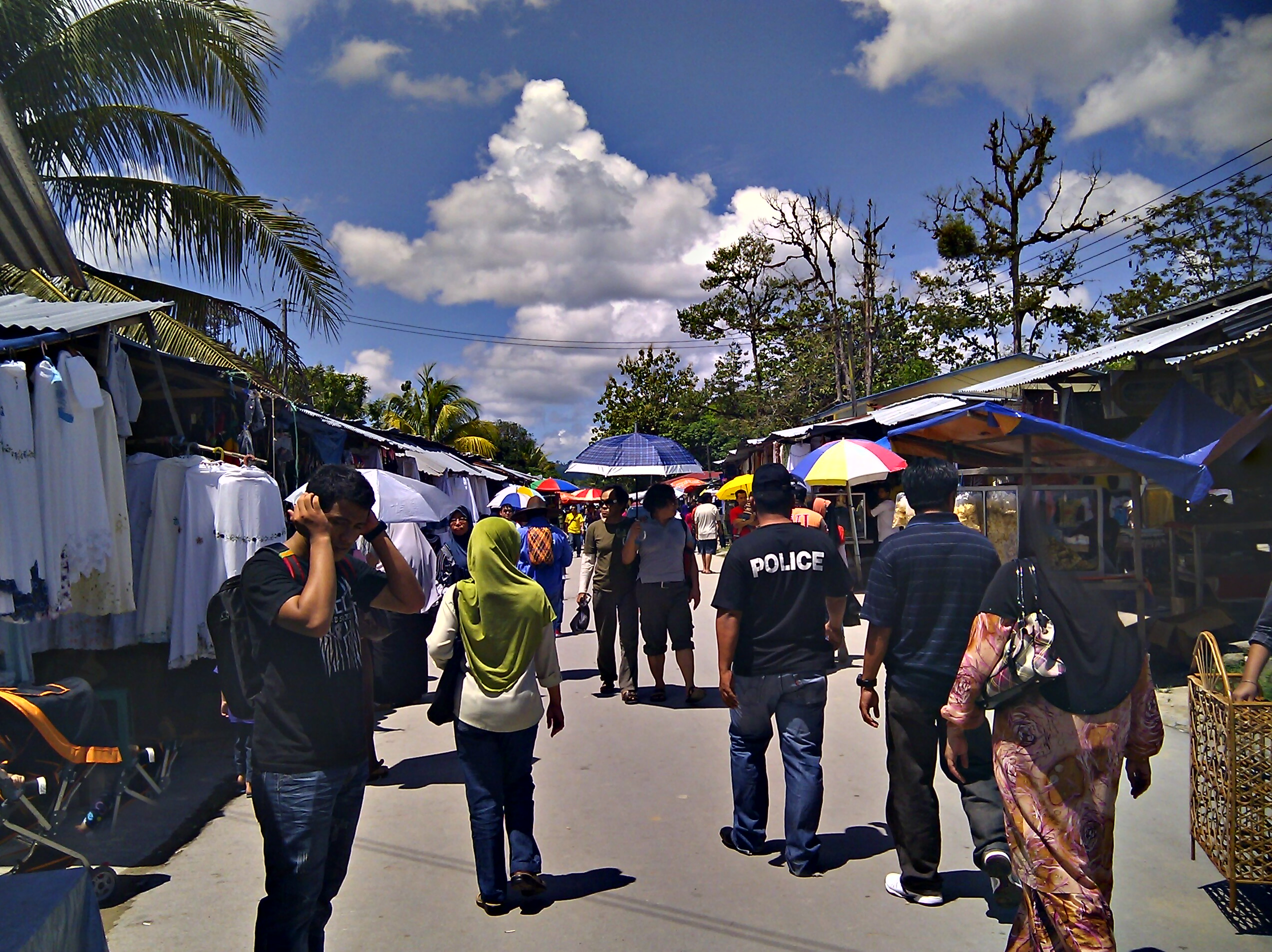
- Serikin weekend border market

- Location within Borneo
- Coordinates: 1°20′0″N 110°00′0″E
- Country: Malaysia
- State: Sarawak

Serikin is a small Dayak Bidayuh town in Kuching Division, Sarawak, Federation Of Malaysia. The town is located about 15 km from Bau town and 80 km from Kuching city. Serikin is located on the border of Indonesia and Malaysia. Serikin is called Kampung Jagoi Serikin by the local residents. Residents of Kampong Jagoi Serikin call themselves BiRikin.

The first Headman was Angau Pak Aseng. He was replaced by No'ew Pak Ahong. The third Headman was Mideh anak Guniew or Pak Jiheng. the fourth was Jiheng anak Mideh or Pak Jiming. the fifth was Mecky and the fifth and current (since 2023) is Jepes

Serikin is well known among locals and tourists for its weekend market. Held on each Saturday and Sunday, the market attracts many who come to buy goods from sellers from Indonesia. Serikin Weekend Market was started in 1992.

Located nearby are Kangang Waterfall and Tuboh Waterfall.

== Climate ==
Serikin has a tropical rainforest climate (Af) with heavy to very heavy rainfall year-round.

Climate data for Serikin
Month	Jan	Feb	Mar	Apr	May	Jun	Jul	Aug	Sep	Oct	Nov	Dec	Year
Mean daily maximum °C (°F)	29.3 (84.7)	29.5 (85.1)	30.5 (86.9)	31.3 (88.3)	31.7 (89.1)	31.4 (88.5)	31.4 (88.5)	31.2 (88.2)	31.0 (87.8)	31.0 (87.8)	30.7 (87.3)	30.1 (86.2)	30.8 (87.4)
Daily mean °C (°F)	25.7 (78.3)	25.8 (78.4)	26.4 (79.5)	26.9 (80.4)	27.1 (80.8)	26.9 (80.4)	26.8 (80.2)	26.6 (79.9)	26.6 (79.9)	26.6 (79.9)	26.4 (79.5)	26.1 (79.0)	26.5 (79.7)
Mean daily minimum °C (°F)	22.1 (71.8)	22.1 (71.8)	22.3 (72.1)	22.5 (72.5)	22.6 (72.7)	22.4 (72.3)	22.2 (72.0)	22.1 (71.8)	22.2 (72.0)	22.3 (72.1)	22.2 (72.0)	22.2 (72.0)	22.3 (72.1)
Average rainfall mm (inches)	541 (21.3)	512 (20.2)	323 (12.7)	287 (11.3)	227 (8.9)	171 (6.7)	174 (6.9)	219 (8.6)	242 (9.5)	306 (12.0)	329 (13.0)	444 (17.5)	3,775 (148.6)
Source: Climate-Data.org
