= Babang luksa =

Babang luksa may refer to:

- A Filipino funeral custom that takes place on the first anniversary of a death
- Babangluksa (film), a 2011 Filipino horror film
