= Battle of Kindau =

- Part of the Indonesia–Malaysia Confrontation
Date	15 June 1965
Location	Kindau, Kalimantan (Indonesian Borneo)
Result	Australian victory

Belligerents
Australia	Indonesia

Commanders and leaders
(Australia) Douglas Byers	(Indonesia) Unknown

Strength
30	~100

Casualties and losses
2 wounded	25–50 killed

The Battle of Kindau (15 June 1965) took place during the Indonesia–Malaysia confrontation. Involving Australian and Indonesian troops, the battle was the third in a series of successful ambushes between May and July 1965 launched by the 3rd Battalion, Royal Australian Regiment (3 RAR), in Kalimantan (Indonesian Borneo). The ambushes were part of the wider Operation Claret which involved cross-border operations by British-Commonwealth units from bases in Sarawak, penetrating up to 10,000 yards (9,100 m) into Indonesian territory with the aim of disrupting the movement and resupply of Indonesian forces and to keep them off balance.

On 15 June 1965—three days after C Company, 3 RAR had its successful ambush at Sungei Koemba—a platoon from A Company successfully ambushed another large Indonesian force before withdrawing under the cover of artillery fire. The ambush resulted in heavy Indonesian casualties, while two Australians were wounded in the engagement. Unlike previous encounters the battle did not remain unpublicised, after a journalist was able to interview one of the Australian wounded. Nonetheless the fiction that the incident had occurred in Malaysian territory was maintained.

== Prelude ==
As a consequence of the previous successful Australian ambushes along the Sungei Koemba river in May and June, the Indonesians planned to increase their activity with H BTP and J BTP moving against the Gumbang, Tringgus and Bukit Knuckle areas, while additional forces from BTP 2 were also subsequently redeployed against Serian. (Note: Batalyon Tim Pertempuran (BTP) were battalion combat teams formed from sub-units from one battalion attached to another unit, the resultant unit was then designated with a letter. See Dennis & Grey 1996, p. 270.) In response, Australian reconnaissance patrols were increased in order to detect movement into Sarawak, and these would later result in further fighting. One such patrol by 2 Platoon, A Company ascertained that the Indonesians had recently increased their use of an east-west track crossing the border south-west of the company base at Stass and consequently the Australians decided to conduct a further Claret operation in order to take advantage of the opportunity provided.

== Battle ==
On 12 June—just hours after C Company's successful ambush at Sungei Koemba—2 Platoon, A Company with a Forward Observation Officer (FOO) party, under the command of Second Lieutenant Douglas Byers, departed Stass with the task of mounting an ambush in the area, under the codename Operation Blockbuster. Occupying an ambush position astride a track running west from the border, in thick swampy jungle 1,300 metres (1,400 yd) inside Kalimantan, Byers was ordered to intercept an Indonesian force, believed to have already infiltrated into Sarawak, upon its return. Establishing a firm base with six men to the rear, the ambush was laid on the southern edge of the track, with the right flank secured by three men across a small creek, while the west flank 75 metres (82 yd) away was protected by four men and Claymore mines in cut-off. Located centrally, the killing group consisted of 14 men. Meanwhile, the forward observer and a 2-inch (51 mm) mortar were placed in depth. That evening the Australians heard Indonesian mortar firing as they targeted the company base at Stass.

Finally, at 13:26 on 15 June 1965, after silently lying in ambush for three days, the Australians observed a large Indonesian force to the east, moving close together one behind the other with their weapons slung. Wearing mostly green uniforms and US steel helmets and webbing, and armed with AR-15 Armalite rifles, they were believed to be regular soldiers from J BTP. Waiting until about 25 Indonesians had entered the engagement area, Byers initiated the ambush with a burst for his Owen submachine gun, with at least 12 killed in the initial fighting. The first three Indonesian soldiers had initially escaped unscathed, and they ran down the track to the west, only to be killed instantly by Claymores fired by the Australian cut-off party. However, with the Indonesian force numbering up to 100 men, only the lead elements had been caught in the Australian ambush and they responded with mortar and machine-gun fire, as well as a number of grenades that failed to explode.

Outnumbered, a fierce battle ensued with the Australians quickly silencing the Indonesian machine gun with small-arms fire while suffering one man wounded in the knee. Meanwhile, effective Australian counter-battery fire soon silenced the Indonesian mortars. Seventeen bodies were counted by the Australians following the initial engagement, along with another seven wounded, although they believed that up to 25 had been killed in the ambush. The forward observer then called in further mortar and artillery fire, with 105-millimetre (4.1 in) and 5.5-inch (140 mm) rounds slamming into the Indonesian positions. As a result, the Indonesians suffered a number of further casualties, including some of those wounded in the initial ambush, while a larger party which had come to investigate the action was also caught in the barrage. By 13:45 the Australian platoon began withdrawing back to its firm base, carrying one of their wounded with them. A second Australian, although wounded in the thigh by shrapnel, was still able to walk.

Total Indonesian losses were later estimated to have been as high as 50 killed due to the highly accurate artillery fire, which suppressed the forces attempting to follow up the Australians, as well as countering heavy Indonesian indirect fire. Subsequent intelligence reports indicated that the Indonesian force had only recently arrived in Kindau, and were engaged on their first operation. Meanwhile, the Australians had continued their withdrawal and successfully reached the border by 16:00, with their casualties later evacuated by helicopter from a prearranged landing zone inside Sarawak. The platoon arrived back at Stass the next day.

== Aftermath ==
Unlike the previous incidents, the ambush at Kindau did not remain unpublicised however, after a journalist managed to interview one of the Australian wounded in the British Military Hospital in Singapore. Regardless, the authorities were able to maintain the fiction that the incident had occurred in Malaysian territory, and it was reported that the incident had occurred in Sarawak and not in Indonesian territory as was really the case. The ambush had been planned and rehearsed in detail, and was later described as a "classic ambush", and was considered an "example of a typical Borneo ambush." Byers was subsequently awarded the Military Cross for his skillful conduct. The fire support provided to 3 RAR had been particularly effective, as evidenced according to the commanding officer of the 4th Light Regiment, by the infantry buying the gunners "far too much beer".

In addition to inflicting significant casualties on Indonesian forces, the successful Australian ambushes on the Sungei Koemba and at Kindau in May and June allowed 3 RAR to dominate the border area, while also providing early warning of Indonesian incursions into Sarawak. Following these actions Major General George Lea, the British Director of Operations, ordered a short pause in offensive operations in order to observe the effects. Indonesian mortar attacks on company bases in the 3 RAR area of operation, which had been heavy throughout May and June, ceased soon afterwards. Following the resumption of Claret operations the Australian battalion later followed this up with another profitable mission at Babang on 12 July, contributing to the wider success of the British-Commonwealth forces in slowly asserting control on the war.

== Notes ==
Footnotes

Citations
