= Operation Claret =

Series of raids during the Indonesia–Malaysia confrontation

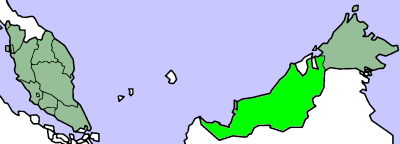
- Sarawak
- Planned by: (United Kingdom) General Sir Walter Walker
- Objective: Keep Indonesian forces off balance
- Date: July 1964 – July 1966
- Outcome: Commonwealth military success

Claret was the code name given to operations conducted from about July 1964 until July 1966 from East Malaysia (Sarawak and Sabah) across the border in Indonesian Kalimantan during the Indonesia–Malaysia confrontation. They were instigated by the Director of Borneo Operations (DOBOPS) Major General Walter Walker with the agreement of the British and Malaysian governments. Their purpose was to seize the initiative and put the Indonesians on the defensive instead of allowing Indonesian forces to be safely based in Kalimantan and attack when and where they chose. However, it was important not to cause the Indonesians to lose face and possibly escalate the conflict, or to enable Indonesia to present evidence of 'imperialist aggression', so Claret operations were highly classified and never publicised, although it seems that some British journalists were aware of what transpired. British casualties on Claret operations were publicly reported as being in East Malaysia.

These operations involved both special forces and infantry. Special forces were mostly reconnaissance patrols crossing the border from the Malaysian state of Sarawak or Sabah into Indonesian Kalimantan in order to find and monitor Indonesian forces who might attack Sarawak or Sabah. Conventional forces were tasked to act on this information and that from other sources to ambush or otherwise attack the Indonesians under a policy of 'aggressive defence'. Such operations were to be 'deniable' as they may have represented a violation of state sovereignty, however they were justified at the time as an instance of hot pursuit. Operation Claret was largely successful in gaining the initiative for the British Commonwealth forces, inflicting significant casualties on the Indonesians and keeping them on the defensive, before being suspended late in the war.

== Background ==
The border between East Malaysia and Kalimantan was not well defined and 22 Special Air Service reconnaissance patrols seem to have liberally interpreted its inexactitude from late 1963 or early 1964. From early 1964 Indonesian cross-border raids increased and the mixed attacks by ill-trained 'volunteers' 'advised' by Indonesian troops were replaced by an increasing numbers of raids comprising only Indonesian armed forces. This caused increasing concern to DOBOPS.

However, in July 1964 the new Labour government in London approved cross-border offensive operations to a depth of 5,000 yards (4,600 m) by both special forces and infantry under the code-name Claret. DOBOPS added additional conditions, seven 'Golden Rules':

- authorisation by DOBOPS for every operation,
- only trained and tested troops to be used,
- penetration depth to be limited, attacks only to thwart enemy offensive action, never retribution of casualties, civilian casualties never to be risked,
- no air support, except in extreme emergency,
- operations to be planned and rehearsed for at least two weeks,
- every operation to be planned and executed with maximum security, cover plans made, code names for each operation, soldiers sworn to secrecy no details to be discussed over radio or telephone, no id disks to be worn and no identifiable material to be left in Kalimantan,
- no soldiers to be captured alive or dead.

Claret operations were only publicly disclosed by Britain in 1974, whilst the Australian government did not officially acknowledge its involvement until 1996.

The number of Claret operations and their objectives is unclear. Weekly operational reports by brigade, higher headquarters and some units are available in UK National Archives. They do not identify any actions as specifically Claret. They outline 'contacts' in a way that implies they took place in East Malaysia but provide a grid reference, from which those south of the border can be identified with the aid of a 1:50,000 scale map. However, the border is some 1,000 miles (1,600 km) long.

== Nature of Operations ==
The operations varied in size from 4 man special forces reconnaissance patrols to infantry fighting patrols in company strength, sometimes coordinated in a battalion operation. They included at least one 'permanent' Claret task, an artillery position (gun and observation post) astride the border ridge with authority to fire at any identifiable Indonesian forces inside Indonesia. Infantry tasks included fighting patrols inside Indonesia looking for opportunity 'contacts', attacks on Indonesian positions and ambushing tracks and rivers.

Permanent Claret operation, 105 mm pack howitzer position BRX on the border ridge (a few metres wide with steep slopes on both sides) in Northern Sarawak at 3°52′13″N 115°37′8″E, approximately 22 km North East of Bario and 12 km South of Ba'kelalen. On the right of the gun are tripod mounted binoculars observing the Long Bawan valley, on the left a 12.7 mm machine gun on an anti-aircraft mounting.

Initially, apart from special forces, only Gurkha infantry were used in company strength, and a battalion could only have one operation at a time. As experience and the situation developed these changed, and the Golden Rules on preparation and rehearsal, and the definition of thwarting offensive action relaxed. So too was the need for 'sworn secrecy', if it ever existed, and an early ban on internal discussion of operations. In 1965 penetration limits were increased to 10,000 yards (9,100 m) in the wake of the Indonesian assault at the Battle of Plaman Mapu, and then 20,000 yards (18,000 m). Small amphibious raids on the flanks by Special Boat Service were also authorised.

Infantry operations were usually, if not always, within artillery range. Their depth was also affected by the threat of interception while withdrawing, greater when the Indonesian troop density was higher as it was in the areas south of Kuching. Another constraint was the limited range of man-pack VHF radios A41 & 42, (copies of AN/PRC 9 & 10) and mountainous terrain in some areas. However, A510, an Australian made small HF radio using continuous wave (i.e. Morse code) was used in some areas and new A13 HF radios appeared in early 1966.

Intelligence for these operations came from several sources. These included SAS patrols, Border Scouts (many of whom had relatives in Kalimantan), information from locals gathered by Border Scouts, Military Intelligence Officers and Field Intelligence NCOs, and probably police Special Branch and others. SIGINT collection is unknown.

Infantry operations typically lasted 5 to 10 days. The fighting patrols had to be self-contained and carry all their ammunition and rations. Normal practice was to withdraw after a contact, but staying in the area often led to further ambushing opportunities. Ambushes were the most common tactic, often lasting several days. However, Indonesians did not usually move at night so ambushes could withdraw to a harbour position. Because aircraft were not allowed to fly across the border casualties had to be evacuated by foot until they were back across the border, except in the most extreme cases with personal authorisation by DOBOPS.

Fire support for Claret operations was mostly provided by artillery and, if the target was close to the border and in range, infantry mortars. These were sometimes moved to temporary positions in the border area. The mortars changed from 3-inch to 81 mm with double the range around the end of 1965. Aircraft were not allowed to cross the border. A UK or Australian frigate was the 'guard ship' at Tawau at the eastern end of the border and an artillery amphibious observation party was available to control its fire, however it does not seem to have fired in support of Claret operations.

Artillery support was unconventional because there were significantly more infantry battalions than batteries so the normal direct support relationship was not possible everywhere. Secondly, almost all guns were deployed singly in company or platoon bases. These sections did their own technical fire control and responded directly to fire orders from observers. This meant that most Claret operations were supported by only a single gun, which in turn meant that each gun had far more than its standard scale of ammunition.

== Participants in Operations ==
The vast majority of Claret tasks were undertaken by British infantry units, including all Gurkha battalions. Special forces operations were undertaken by the British Special Air Service, Special Boat Sections, Guards Independent Parachute Company, Gurkha Independent Parachute Company, patrol companies of the Parachute Regiment (C Company 2nd and D Company 3rd Battalions), the Australian Special Air Service Regiment and the 1 Ranger Squadron, New Zealand Special Air Service. The reconnaissance and intelligence gathering activities of the Border Scouts, mostly trained by 22 SAS, are unclear (apart from their accompanying many infantry patrols). The extent to which Malaysian Army units undertook Claret operations is also unclear.

At peak artillery strength in 1965–1966 there were six batteries (two from the Royal Malaysian Artillery) of 105 mm Pack Howitzer, half a battery of 5.5-inch guns and a section of 4.2-inch mortars operated by men detached from the light air defence battery defending Kuching airport. Artillery observation parties accompanied most, if not all, infantry patrols and occasionally special forces ones.

The number of Claret operations by individual infantry units is also unclear. It is probably related to tour length, although from early 1966 frequency decreased as the political situation in Indonesia changed. Units stationed in Malaysia generally did tours of about 4 or 6 months in Borneo, and most British and Gurkha units did repeated tours. UK based units spent 12 months in Malaysia, including jungle training and about 10 months in Borneo in two different areas. It was British policy that units did not do repeat tours in the same area.

Generally units on their first tour were not allowed to undertake more audacious operations so those conducted in their first and only tour by 3rd Battalion, Royal Australian Regiment between May and July 1965 on the Sungei Koemba river, at Kindau and again at Babang may not have been representative of those by more experienced Gurkha and British battalions, even if there were successful.

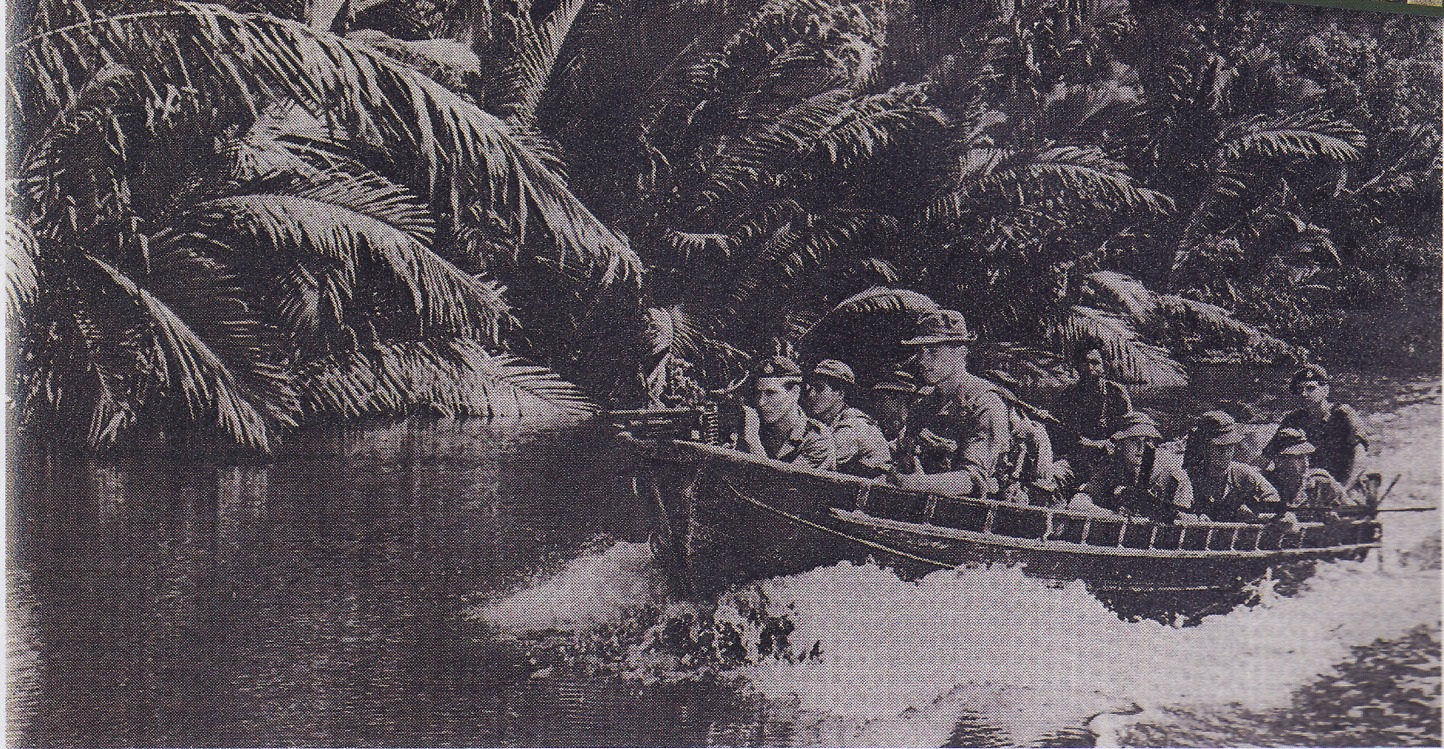
Royal Marines Commando unit patrolling on the river Serudong, Sabah

49 Regiment Royal Artillery, using DUKW (2Ducks) amphibious vehicles

An example of a more complex operation is one by 2 Royal Green Jackets in late 1965, with battalion tactical HQ on the border ridge. It involved one company swimming a river to get behind an enemy base, a second company ambushed the river, when the Indonesian mortars in the base opened fire on the ambush area they were engaged by the battalion's mortars that had been brought forward. This caused some Indonesians to flee their base into the ambush by the first company.

An example of a straightforward Claret operation occurred at the end of 1965. Intelligence reports stated that an Indonesian patrol in about section strength used a particular track every week or 10 days. The Reconnaissance Platoon of the Gordon Highlanders (a battalion with some 10 months in Borneo) left a company base at Long Pa Sia in the 4th Division of Sarawak, established an ambush, which was sprung after several days leaving some 5 Indonesians killed. The platoon withdrew without interference.

However, Claret operations did not always go to plan. In late 1965 intelligence reported the existence of a previously unknown base in the estuarine area west of Tawau at the eastern end of the Border. The Reconnaissance Platoon of the Scots Guards, well into their second tour, conducted an operation to ascertain whether the base was in use and exploit any opportunities that arose. They found the base empty, and leaving 4 men there, started reconnoitering the surrounding area. The base's owners, a company of Indonesian marines (KKO), returned and there was immediate contact. The rest of the platoon returned, reunited and conducted a fighting withdrawal. Over 350 rounds were fired by the single gun in the company base at Serudong Laut, which entailed the entire company there unpacking and moving ammunition to the gun.

The last Claret operation was in July 1966 as a riposte to the raid towards Brunei by Lt Sumbi of 600 Raider Company and 'volunteers' in May. This operation was an artillery ambush from Ba Kelalan in the 5th Division of Sarawak by 1/7 Gurkhas and 38 Light Battery on a track leading to the Long Bawang airfield.

=== Order of battle ===
The following infantry units undertook Claret operations (some of British units included elements from other battalions as well):

- 40 Commando Royal Marines
- 42 Commando Royal Marines
- 1st Battalion, Scots Guards
- 1st Battalion, King's Own Scottish Borderers
- 1st Battalion, Gordon Highlanders
- 1st Battalion, Royal Ulster Rifles
- 1st Battalion, Durham Light Infantry
- 1st Battalion, Argyll and Sutherland Highlanders
- 2nd Battalion, Green Jackets
- 3rd Battalion, Green Jackets
- 2nd Battalion, Parachute Regiment
- 1st Battalion, Royal Hampshire Regiment
- 1st Battalion, 2nd Gurkha Rifles
- 2nd Battalion, 2nd Gurkha Rifles
- 1st Battalion, 6th Gurkha Rifles
- 2nd Battalion, 6th Gurkha Rifles
- 1st Battalion, 7th Gurkha Rifles
- 2nd Battalion, 7th Gurkha Rifles
- 1st Battalion, 10th Gurkha Rifles
- 2nd Battalion, 10th Gurkha Rifles
- 1st Battalion, Royal New Zealand Infantry Regiment
- 3rd Battalion, Royal Australian Regiment
- 4th Battalion, Royal Australian Regiment

The following artillery units supported Claret operations by providing guns and observation parties. Additional observation parties were provided by other batteries stationed in Hong Kong and many individuals did tours with other batteries.

- 4th Light Regiment Royal Artillery (comprising 29 (Corunna) Battery Royal Artillery, 88 (Arracan) Battery Royal Artillery, 97 Battery (Lawson's Company) Royal Artillery Light Batteries)*;
- 40th Light Regiment Royal Artillery (comprising 38 (Seringapatum), 129 (Dragon), 137 (Java) Light Batteries)*;
- 70 Light, 176 (Abu Klea) Battery Royal Artillery Light, 170 (Imjin) Medium Batteries (of 45th Light Regiment Royal Artillery);
- V Battery Royal Horse Artillery (Light Battery), 132 Battery (The Bengal Rocket Troop) Royal Artillery (Medium Battery) (of 6th Light Regiment Royal Artillery);
- 79 (Kirkee), 145 (Maiwand), Commando Light Batteries (of 29th Commando Light Regiment Royal Artillery);
- 7 (Sphinx), 8 (Alma), Commando Light Batteries (of 95th Commando Light Regiment Royal Artillery) (Note: there was regrouping of batteries between 29 and 95 Regts during the period); and
- 102 Field Battery Royal Australian Artillery.

[# indicates two or more tours in Borneo]
[* indicates a UK-based unit]

[Note: this is not a list of all units that served in Borneo, only those that are believed to have undertaken Claret operations. No official UK history has been produced covering Confrontation. However, operational reports by HQs are in National Archives as are some unit records.]
