= Battle of Babang =

- Part of the Indonesia–Malaysia Confrontation
Date	12 July 1965
Location	Babang, Kalimantan (Indonesian Borneo)
Result	Australian victory

Belligerents
Australia	Indonesia

Commanders and leaders
Ivor Hodgkinson; Robert Guest †	Unknown

Strength
40	30

Casualties and losses
2 wounded	13 killed 5 wounded

The Battle of Babang (12 July 1965) was the fourth and last in a series of successful ambushes conducted between in May and July 1965 by Australian troops from 3rd Battalion, Royal Australian Regiment (3 RAR), this time at Babang in Kalimantan (Indonesian Borneo), during the Indonesia-Malaysia Confrontation. The ambushes were conducted under the wider British-Commonwealth Operation Claret, being cross-border operations mounted from bases in Sarawak up to 10,000 yards (9,100 m) into Indonesian territory with aim of disrupting the movement and resupply of Indonesian forces and to keep them off balance.

On 12 July 1965 7 Platoon C Company under Lieutenant Robert Guest—again accompanied by the Company Commander, Major Ivor Hodgkinson, the battalion Intelligence Officer and a fire control party—was occupying an ambush position along a well-used track in the vicinity of the Indonesian base at Babang, on the border. At about midday a force of about 30 Indonesians approached along the track and was subsequently ambushed. The Indonesian platoon counter-attacked and the Australians withdrew under the cover of defensive artillery fire. At least 13 Indonesians were killed and five wounded, while the Australians suffered no losses.

Like the other successful Claret missions conducted by 3 RAR earlier at Sungei Koemba and Kindau, the ambush at Babang inflicted significant casualties on Indonesian forces and allowed it to dominate the border area. This provided early warning of Indonesian incursions into Sarawak as well as contributing to the wider success of the British-Commonwealth forces in slowly asserting control on the war. Of note, generally units on their first tour in Borneo were not allowed to undertake such audacious operations, and as such those conducted by 3 RAR in their first and only tour may not have been representative of those by more experienced Gurkha and British battalions.
