= Australia in the Korean War 1950–53 =

Book by Robert John O'Neill

- Author: Robert O'Neill
- Language: English
- Subject: Military history of Australia during the Korean War
- Genre: Military history
- Publisher: Australian War Memorial and the Australian Government Publishing Service
- Publication date: 1981 and 1985
- Publication place: Australia
- Preceded by: Australia in the War of 1939–1945
- Followed by: The Official History of Australia's Involvement in Southeast Asian Conflicts 1948–1975

Australia in the Korean War 1950–53 is the official history of Australia's involvement in the Korean War. The series consists of two volumes covering Australia's strategy and diplomacy in the war and the Australian military's combat operations respectively. Both volumes were written by Robert O'Neill, and they were published in 1981 and 1985.

== Development and publication ==
In 1970 Robert O'Neill was selected by the Australian Government as the official historian of the Korean War. O'Neill had served as the 5th Battalion, Royal Australian Regiment's intelligence officer during the Vietnam War, and had later become an academic. At the time of his appointment he was head of the Strategic and Defence Studies Centre at the Australian National University.

While the official histories of Australia in the First World War and Second World War had been written by teams of historians, O'Neill wrote the history of the Korean War with only a single research assistant based at the Australian War Memorial. The Australian Government maintained its tradition of granting independence to the official historian, though the Attorney-General's Department attempted to influence the series' treatment of the journalist and alleged traitor Wilfred Burchett. While the official history was originally planned as a single volume, O'Neill received permission to expand it to two volumes after discovering large amounts of material on the strategy and diplomacy behind Australia's involvement in the war. In contrast with the official Australian histories of the world wars, O'Neill included footnotes and bibliographies to identify his sources.

The first volume of the series, Strategy and Diplomacy, was published in 1981. It provided a detailed account of Australia's foreign and defence policies before and during the war, including in-depth discussion of the evolution of the ANZUS Treaty.

The series' second volume, entitled Combat Operations, was published in 1985. The book's account of the Australian Army, Royal Australian Navy and Royal Australian Air Force's operations in Korea is highly detailed. Because the three services rarely operated together O'Neill was able to treat their operations separately when writing the book.

== Reception ==
Australia in the Korean War 1950–53 was generally well received by critics, though some argued that it was overly detailed. The Oxford Companion to Australian Military History states that the series is "scholarly and meticulous". Historian Jeffrey Grey writes that the second volume is "essential reading, although the level of detail is not necessary for the general reader". Peter Edwards, the editor of The Official History of Australia's Involvement in Southeast Asian Conflicts 1948–1975, states that the first volume in the series has been of most importance to Australian historiography due to its "detailed and authoritative" coverage of the ANZUS treaty. There was little public interest in the books after they were released, however, and sales of both volumes were slow.
