= Official History of Australian Operations in Iraq and Afghanistan, and Australian Peacekeeping Operations in East Timor =

Australian military history series

- Author: Craig Stockings (official historian)
- Language: English
- Genre: Official history military history
- Publisher: NewSouth
- Publication place: Australia
- Preceded by: Official History of Australian Peacekeeping, Humanitarian and Post-Cold War Operations

The Official History of Australian Operations in Iraq and Afghanistan, and Australian Peacekeeping Operations in East Timor is an Australian official history series currently under preparation. It was approved by the Australian Government in 2015. The series was due to be completed by mid-2022 but has been delayed due to difficulties in obtaining clearance from the Department of Foreign Affairs and Trade. The first volume in the series was published in December 2022.

== History ==
=== Project management ===
While scoping the Official History of Australian Peacekeeping, Humanitarian and Post-Cold War Operations in the early 2000s, the official historian for that series, David Horner judged that work should commence as soon as possible on a separate series covering the Australian involvement in the operations in Afghanistan after 2001 and the Australian contribution to the 2003 invasion of Iraq. However, when it approved this series in 2004, Cabinet excluded the Australian operations in East Timor, Afghanistan and Iraq from Horner's remit. In 2006 Horner sought the Australian Government's agreement to expand the series to include East Timor, but this was again denied, despite no additional funds being sought for books.

Horner continued to advocate for a new series over subsequent years. At the launch of the first volume in the Official History of Australian Peacekeeping, Humanitarian and Post-Cold War Operations to be published in April 2011, Horner stated that it was a "national disgrace" that work was not underway on the next series. Australian Foreign Minister Kevin Rudd indicated that he supported such a project in his remarks when launching the book. In September 2011 the Australian War Memorial (AWM) agreed to conduct a feasibility study into an official history on the operations in Afghanistan, East Timor and Iraq. This study was completed in 2012 by Horner, who judged that it would be feasible to prepare an official history of Australia's involvement in Afghanistan and Iraq. The AWM Council endorsed this conclusion, and recommended that work begin as soon as possible.

A submission seeking Cabinet's approval of the project was subsequently prepared. While initial versions of the submission proposed that it cover only operations in Afghanistan and Iraq, it was later broadened to also cover East Timor. The final submission proposed either expanding the Official History of Australian Peacekeeping, Humanitarian and Post-Cold War Operations to cover operations in the three countries up to 2006 or establishing an entirely new series. The political turmoil associated with the three changes of federal government in 2013 delayed official approval, with the submission being put forward and withdrawn on two occasions.

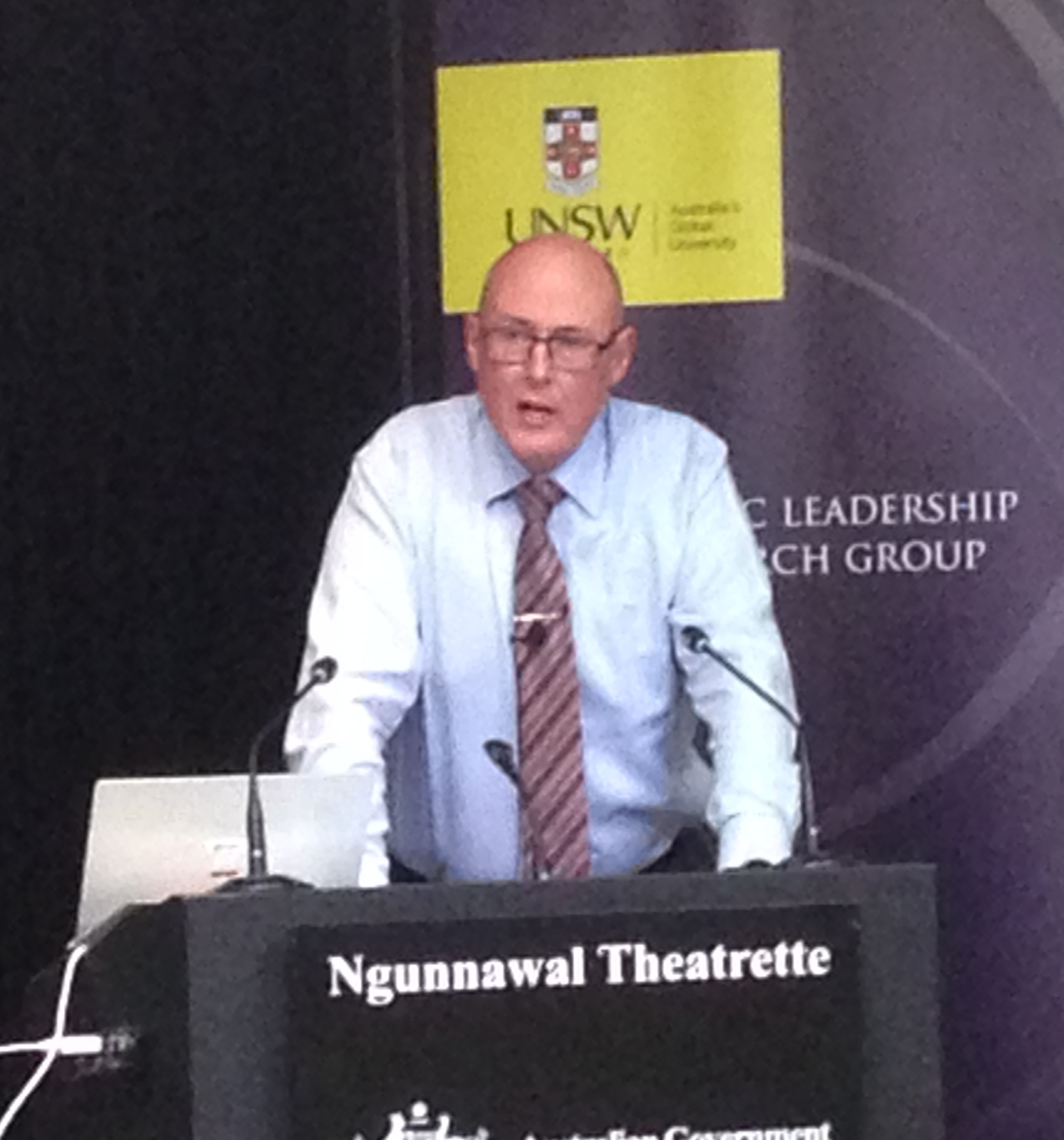
Craig Stockings in 2019

In 2015 the Abbott government authorised the official history. The approved scope of the series was operations in East Timor from 1999 to 2012; Afghanistan between 2001 and 2014; and Iraq from 2003 to 2011. A total of $12.6 million was allocated to the AWM for the project in the 2015–16 federal budget. The position of official historian for the series was advertised in June 2015. Craig Stockings was appointed to this role, and commenced on the project in March 2016. Applications for authors of the volumes in the series were sought in early 2016.

There are some differences in how the Official History of Australian Operations in Iraq and Afghanistan, and Australian Peacekeeping Operations in East Timor is being prepared compared to earlier Australian official history series. The budget for the project is much larger than that allocated for any previous official history, but the timeframe in which it is to be completed is also significantly shorter. In his letter commissioning Stockings as the official historian, Prime Minister Malcolm Turnbull specified that the series had to be completed by July 2022. Each of the authors was given five years to complete their volume, with Stockings having six years in which he is required to write a volume and edit the series. Stockings has written that the process of preparing the series "is a public service project, and needs to be managed as such".

Despite these changes from previous practices, the authors continue to have access to all relevant files, and the freedom to reach their own conclusions. Stockings has written that the Government will not have the ability to influence the content of the books, other than to request that material which would cause security problems be omitted.

In July 2018 NewSouth won the tender conducted by the AWM for a publisher for the series.

=== First volume on East Timor ===
In November 2019 it was reported that the official history project was "in danger of collapse amid claims that bureaucrats are trying to censor its first volume". The Department of Foreign Affairs and Trade (DFAT) had requested a very large number of changes to the first volume on East Timor to protect the reputations of senior Australian public servants and avoid damaging the Australian Government's relationship with Indonesia. Stockings was reported to have refused to make the changes and threatened to resign over the issue, which had delayed the book's publication. Former Foreign Minister Alexander Downer has been told that the department objected to the book's first nine chapters, which cover the history of East Timor between World War II and the 1999 intervention. Downer also noted that while there may have been reasons to have not approved an official history of the intervention in 2006 due to Indonesian sensitivities, this was no longer the case.

The official historians for the three previous official history series, Robert O'Neill, Peter Edwards and David Horner, released an open letter regarding the issue on 19 November. The letter stated that censoring the volume on the grounds of diplomatic sensitivity would breach the Australian official history tradition, with material in previous series only being excluded if was information provided by foreign governments which those governments had not yet released or clearly had national security implications for Australia. The three historians called on the Minister for Foreign Affairs Marise Payne "to instruct her departmental officers to withdraw any objections, based on current diplomatic sensitivity, to publication of first volume of the current official history". The changes requested by DFAT included asking for the first nine chapters to be condensed into two chapters on the grounds that they provided excessive detail on events before the East Timorese independence referendum in 1999 and could cause diplomatic sensitivities. During negotiations with DFAT the then director of the AWM, Brendan Nelson, initially proposed that the chapters be condensed and the full text be released 30 years after the book was published. He later changed his position and strongly advocated for the inclusion of all nine chapters.

Stockings and Nelson met with Payne in 2019 to discuss DFAT's handling of the volume. In January 2020 the clearance process resumed using revised arrangements, and the acting director of the AWM informed Senator Rex Patrick that the institution was confident that this approach would prove successful. Patrick expressed concern, however, over the memorial refusing a freedom of information request he had lodged regarding the matter and the possibility that the book may be "doctored". The book was eventually cleared by DFAT after a three year long process. Professor Clinton Fernandes told the ABC that the lengthy clearance process likely resulted from material in the book that demonstrated that the Australian Government opposed East Timorese independence until 1999. DFAT denied this.

The first volume in the official history series, entitled Born of Fire and Ash, was released in December 2022. An official launch was not held by the AWM, which Stockings described in February 2023 as being "unusual". The AWM told the ABC that a launch will take place at a later date. The executive director of the Australian Defence Association, Neil James, noted that the lack of an official launch was "suspicious" and "odd" as "every official history series since the tradition commenced has been launched with much fanfare, except this one". Horner was also surprised by the lack of an official launch, which he attributed to the government being embarrassed by the content of the book. He noted that this was a continuation of the "unprecedented political interference" by DFAT officers. Horner also believes that embarrassment over the Australian Government's opposition to East Timorese independence was the reason the initial proposals to commission an official history of operations in East Timor were rejected.

=== Second volume on East Timor ===
In May 2024 it was reported that DFAT was refusing to approve the second volume of the official history series on the Australian intervention in East Timor after reviewing it over three years. The Guardian stated that "DFAT officials wanted no mention of ASIS spies having bugged the Timorese cabinet room during negotiations over Timor Gap oil resources in 2004 included in the second volume. Nor did they want any canvassing of the complications involved in the transition to Timorese independence". All the other eight Australian Government agencies required to vet the book for publication had approved it.

During a speech in March 2024, Stockings noted that the obstruction he had faced over the first volume was being repeated. Horner and John Blaxland, who authored part of the official history of ASIO, expressed concerns over the attempted suppression of issues in the official history series. Horner told The Guardian that "what we’re talking about is not playing around with words – what we’re talking about here is issues that amount to censorship".

As of October 2026, the second volume on East Timor had been cleared, but not published.

=== Other delays ===
In October 2026 the Returned and Services League of Australia, Legacy Australia and the AWM called for the remaining volumes in the series to be published. The RSL's national president noted that veterans were concerned that the government was trying to cover up issues in the wars in Afghanistan and Iraq. He stated that the slow clearance process was due to "bureaucratic mismanagement and a complete misunderstanding of the purpose of the history" and called on Prime Minister Anthony Albanese to expediate the clearance process. At this time, one of the volumes on the Middle East had been cleared but not published, two were awaiting clearance and the final draft of the other was complete but had not been submitted for clearance.

== Planned volumes ==
An Australian and an Afghan soldier during a patrol in 2013; operations in Afghanistan will be covered by three of the six planned volumes in the series

As of March 2018, it was planned to structure the series into six volumes, each written by a different historian. The planned structure of the volumes is:

- Volume I: Operations in Afghanistan and the Middle East between 2001 and 2006
- Volume II: Operations in Iraq between 2003 and 2011
- Volume III: Operations in Afghanistan between 2005 and 2010
- Volume IV: Operations in Afghanistan between 2010 and 2014
- Two works on Australian peacekeeping operations in East Timor, split into:
  - Volume I: Operations during 1999 and 2000
  - Volume II: Operations between 2000 and 2012.

In 2017 Stockings noted that the volume on Iraq may be split into two books.

In September 2022, the first volume was announced as Born of Fire and Ash: Australian operations in response to the East Timor crisis 1999–2000, authored by Stockings. It was released in December 2022.
