= Assessment of the Battle of Long Tan =

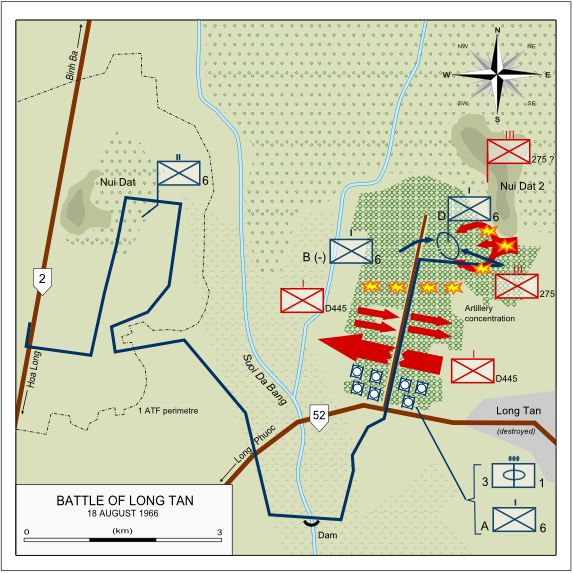
Battle of Long Tan, 18 August 1966

The Battle of Long Tan took place on 18 August 1966 in Phước Tuy province, South Vietnam, during the Vietnam War between Viet Cong and North Vietnamese units from the Viet Cong 275th Regiment, possibly reinforced by at least one North Vietnamese battalion, and D445 Provincial Mobile Battalion, and Australian forces from D Company, 6th Battalion, Royal Australian Regiment (6 RAR). Although the Australians were heavily outnumbered and almost overwhelmed by the Viet Cong the battle ended in a decisive victory for them, establishing their dominance over the province. This perspective however sharply contrasts with competing interpretations in which the D445 Battalion had garnered strong political support in Phuoc Tay. Furthermore, the local D445 Battalion was redeployed northwards against the newly deployed 11th Armored Cavalry Taskforce a month later and so the true significance of the battle is called into question.

However, in the years since it was fought the intentions of the Viet Cong, in particular in mortaring the Australian base at Nui Dat on the night on 16/17 August, have been much debated. This has included the possibility that the Viet Cong had intended to attack and overwhelm Nui Dat, with the initial plan to mortar the base to draw a response force into an ambush after which the base would be attacked and captured, but that they had been prevented from doing so after clashing with D Company, 6 RAR. A second possibility was that they may have had the more limited aim of drawing D Company into an ambush to destroy it and secure a small victory over an isolated force. Finally, it was possible no ambush was planned at all, and that the Viet Cong had been moving on Nui Dat in regimental strength when they unexpectedly ran into D Company, resulting in an encounter battle. Later interviews conducted by an Australian veteran of the battle Terry Burstall, with commanders of the 275th Battalion and D445 Battalion including the battle commander and later Deputy Defense Minister Nguyen Thoi Bung indicate that mortaring was intended to draw out the 6 RAR out of their base, in which an ambush was to occur followed by a retreat before artillery and air support can be utilised, typical of the grab-by-the-belt tactic.

== Background ==
The Battle of Long Tan (18 August 1966) took place in a rubber plantation near Long Tan, in Phước Tuy province, South Vietnam, during the Vietnam War. The action was fought between Australian forces and Viet Cong and North Vietnamese units after 108 men from D Company, 6th Battalion, Royal Australian Regiment (6 RAR) clashed with a force of 1,500 to 2,500 from the Viet Cong 275th Regiment, possibly reinforced by at least one North Vietnamese battalion, and D445 Provincial Mobile Battalion. The 1st Australian Task Force (1 ATF) had arrived between April and June 1966, constructing a base at Nui Dat. After two months it had moved beyond the initial requirements of establishing itself and securing its immediate approaches, beginning operations to open the province. Meanwhile, in response to the threat posed by 1 ATF the 275th Regiment was ordered to move against Nui Dat. For several weeks Australian signals intelligence (SIGINT) had tracked a radio transmitter moving westwards to a position just north of Long Tan; however, extensive patrolling failed to find the unit. At 02:43 on the night of 16/17 August, Viet Cong mortars, recoilless rifles (RCLs) and artillery heavily bombarded Nui Dat from a position 2,000 metres (2,200 yd) to the east, before being engaged by counter-battery fire. The following morning B Company, 6 RAR departed Nui Dat to locate the firing points and the direction of the Viet Cong withdrawal. A number of weapon pits were subsequently found, as were the positions of the mortars and RCLs.

D Company took over the pursuit around midday on 18 August. At 15:40 the lead element, 11 Platoon, clashed with a Viet Cong squad and forced them to withdraw. Shortly after resuming the advance, at 16:08 the platoon came under small-arms and rocket-propelled grenade fire from a flank after drawing ahead of the other platoons and was isolated. Pinned down, they called for artillery support as a monsoon rain began, reducing visibility. Beginning as an encounter battle, heavy fighting ensued as the advancing battalions of the Viet Cong 275th Regiment attempted to encircle and destroy the Australians. After less than 20 minutes more than a third of 11 Platoon had become casualties, while the platoon commander was killed soon after. 10 Platoon moved up on the left in support but was repulsed. With D Company facing a much larger force, 12 Platoon tried to push up on the right at 17:15. Fighting off an attack on their right before pushing forward another 100 metres (110 yd) they sustained increasing casualties after clashing with several groups moving around their western flank to form a cut-off prior to a frontal assault. Opening a path to 11 Platoon yet unable to advance further, they threw smoke to mark their location. Nearly out of ammunition, at 18:00 two UH-1B Iroquois from No. 9 Squadron RAAF arrived overhead to resupply D Company. Meanwhile, the survivors from 11 Platoon withdrew to 12 Platoon during a lull, suffering further losses. Still heavily engaged, both platoons then moved back to the company position covered by artillery.

By 18:10 D Company had reformed but was still in danger of being overrun. A Company, 6 RAR was dispatched in M113 armoured personnel carriers from 3 Troop, 1st APC Squadron to reinforce them. Meanwhile, B Company headquarters and one platoon were still returning to base and were also ordered to assist. Leaving Nui Dat at 17:55, the carriers moved east, crossing a swollen creek before encountering elements of D445 Battalion attempting to outflank D Company and assault it from the rear. The Viet Cong were caught by surprise as the cavalry crashed into their flank and with darkness falling they broke through, while B Company entered the position at 19:00. Arriving at a crucial point, the relief force turned the tide of the battle. The Viet Cong had been massing for another assault which would have likely destroyed D Company, yet the firepower and mobility of the armour broke their will, forcing them to withdraw. Continuing past D Company the relief force assaulted the Viet Cong, before moving back to the company position at 19:10. The artillery had been almost constant throughout and proved critical in ensuring the survival of D Company. A later interview with officers involved in the battle indicate some men of the D445 were killed while capturing two wounded Australians, with all having been killed in the barrage. By 19:15 the firing had ceased and the Australians waited for another attack. However, after no counter-attack occurred they prepared to withdraw 750 metres (820 yd) west. With the dead and wounded loaded onto the carriers D Company left at 22:45, while B and A Company departed on foot. A landing zone was then established by the cavalry with the evacuation of the casualties finally completed after midnight. Forming a defensive position ready to repulse an expected attack they remained overnight, enduring the cold and heavy rain.

The Australians returned in strength the next day, sweeping the area and locating a large number of Viet Cong dead. Although initially believing they had suffered a major defeat, as the scale of the Viet Cong's losses were revealed it became clear they had won a significant victory. Two wounded Viet Cong were killed after they moved to engage the Australians, while three were captured. The bodies of the missing from 11 Platoon were also located. Two men had survived despite their wounds, having spent the night in close proximity to the Viet Cong as they attempted to evacuate their own casualties. Due to the likely presence of a sizeable force nearby the Australians remained cautious as they searched for the Viet Cong. Over the next two days they continued to clear the battlefield, uncovering more dead as they did so. Yet with 1 ATF lacking the resources to pursue the withdrawing force, the operation ended on 21 August. Heavily outnumbered but supported by strong artillery fire, D Company held off a regimental assault before a relief force of cavalry and infantry fought their way through and forced the Viet Cong to withdraw. Eighteen Australians were killed and 24 wounded, while Australian official reports claim the Viet Cong lost at least 245 dead which were found over the days that followed. Actual figures are in dispute, by both veterans of the Australian and North Vietnamese side, with allegations of body-count inflation in order to serve public-relations purposes. A decisive Australian victory, Long Tan proved a major local setback for the Viet Cong, indefinitely forestalling an imminent movement against Nui Dat and establishing the task force's dominance over the province. Although there were other large-scale encounters in later years, 1 ATF was not fundamentally challenged again.

== Assessment ==
=== Initial Australian hypotheses ===
In the wake of the battle the Australians were left to speculate on the reason it occurred. One hypothesis was that the Viet Cong had intended to attack and overwhelm Nui Dat, with the initial plan to mortar the base to draw a response force into an ambush after which the base would be attacked and captured, but that they had been prevented from doing so after clashing with D Company. A second possibility was that they may have had the more limited aim of drawing D Company into an ambush to destroy it and secure a small victory over an isolated force. Finally, it was possible no ambush was planned at all, and that the Viet Cong had been moving on Nui Dat in regimental strength when they unexpectedly ran into D Company, resulting in an encounter battle. The evidence suggested they intended an attack on Nui Dat in some form, while the lack of prepared positions from which to mount an ambush made this unlikely. Brigadier David Jackson—Commander 1 ATF—believed the Viet Cong had been on their way to attack Nui Dat on the night of 18/19 August when D Company intercepted them and this was supported by information from a prisoner captured afterwards. They were carrying large quantities of ammunition and may have had sufficient strength to seriously damage the base, even if its defences were likely strong enough to withstand such an attack. Yet, from the earliest Jackson had felt the Viet Cong would have to engage 1 ATF in a major battle if they wished to retain control of Phuoc Tuy, and this interpretation fitted his previous thinking. In dispatching patrols east of Nui Dat following the mortar attack on 16/17 August Jackson seemingly reacted to his opponent's first move, and he may have allowed himself to be shaped into responding as the Viet Cong had intended.

In his after action report Lieutenant Colonel Colin Townsend—Commanding Officer 6 RAR—wrote that he believed D Company had disrupted a regimental attack on the 1 ATF base. Yet years later he stated that he doubted the Viet Cong ever intended attacking Nui Dat. He felt they would have gained more from attacking a soft target such as Ba Ria and that the defences at Nui Dat would have been sufficient to withstand a regimental assault, having been improved significantly in the 11 weeks since its occupation and protected by patrols and overwhelming artillery support, even if they were still to be fully developed. However, there were suspicions a battalion from the 274th Regiment was moving towards Nui Dat from the west at the same time the 275th Regiment approached from the east, and if true such an attack may have been feasible, even if it still would not have achieved the nine to one superiority communist doctrine required. The southern side of the base was only lightly defended and an assault from that direction would have allowed the Viet Cong to attack the gunline first, and if they succeeded in breaking-in would have then crossed 500 metres (550 yd) of open ground before reaching Headquarters 1 ATF. On the other hand, Major Noel Ford—Officer Commanding B Company, 6 RAR—believed the mortar attack served to lure an Australian reaction force into an ambush, arguing the Viet Cong would have been unlikely to telegraph their intentions to attack Nui Dat and that they had left a clear trail for any force dispatched to find the mortar base plate and RCL positions. Townsend disagreed, arguing the mortar crews and RCL teams had actually tried to hamper the follow-up by breaking into small groups, indicating that no such trap had been planned. Meanwhile, Major Harry Honnor—Officer Commanding the 161st Battery, Royal New Zealand Artillery attached to 6 RAR in direct support—believed the bombardment had been used by the Viet Cong to register targets and that D Company had stumbled across the force as it was preparing to launch an assault on Nui Dat two days later, with the battle that ensued preventing this from occurring.

A year after, Nguyen Van Nuong (alias Loc), a former Viet Cong soldier who had rallied, claimed to have been second-in-command of a platoon from D445 Battalion at Long Tan. During questioning he stated they had planned to destroy Nui Dat to allow further operations in Phuoc Tuy, with the force consisting of three battalions from the 275th Regiment, D445 Battalion and several medical units; in total some 2,000 men. The Viet Cong had estimated Australian strength at Nui Dat at 3,000 men and planned to mortar the base to draw a response force into an ambush by two battalions from the 275th Regiment and D445 Battalion, while the remaining battalion would capture Nui Dat. They expected to quickly overwhelm the ambushed force and any relief force, thereby leaving the base relatively undefended. Loc said D445 Battalion's role was to close the rear of the ambush and that they taken only light casualties during the battle. Despite Viet Cong claims he believed only 100 Australians had actually been killed or wounded, and that the official number of Viet Cong casualties was 200 dead, although he had seen more than that on the battlefield and believed many more had died during the fighting. According to Loc the Viet Cong were concerned about 1 ATF's capabilities and would attempt to avoid contact in future. In accounting for the reason Nui Dat ultimately escaped attack it was surmised that D Company may have entered the killing zone before the ambush was prepared and because of this the third battalion may have been unable to be released. Other possibilities included the Viet Cong being forced to abandon that part of the plan by the weight of the artillery, or that they had overestimated the size of the Australian force and retained the third battalion to complete the ambush.

The information from Loc was consistent with that known or suspected by 1 ATF, and other than a single battalion overwhelming Nui Dat, was considered plausible. Yet Smith was adamant D Company had not been ambushed, believing the action to have been an encounter battle regardless of what may have been planned. He argued that the troops in the rubber plantation were not sited for an ambush, while the presence of 2,000 to 3,000 men so close to Nui Dat without prepared positions indicated they were still moving when the first contact occurred. Equally, D Company had been left in possession of the dominant terrain and was not drawn into a killing zone as the plantation offered too much concealment, no effort had been made to cut them off from any relief force sent from Nui Dat, no artillery or mortars were fired into the engagement area, while the thick vegetation to the north prevented the Viet Cong manoeuvring into a favourable position. He reasoned that an ambush would have been more effective near the original base plate position as that was the only location they could have been sure the Australians would investigate given they had no way of knowing D Company would move another 1,500 metres (1,600 yd) east after the handover with B Company where they contacted the 275th Regiment. Finally, communist ambushes were doctrinally completed in less than three hours, but Long Tan had continued for over four. As such Smith concluded that since the tactics used by the Viet Cong had been contrary to many of the principles of an area ambush the battle was unlikely to have been one. McNeill argues though that too many facts may be missing to make a conclusive assessment of Viet Cong intentions as to date no definitive Vietnamese account is available, while according to Ham those that exist are contradictory or unreliable.

=== Later Vietnamese claims ===
In 1988 two former PAVN officers, Nguyen Thanh Hong and Nguyen Van Kiem (a later commander of D445 Battalion)—while being interviewed by the Australian official historian, Ian McNeill—claimed no more than two battalions had been involved, less than half the lowest Australian estimate. Kiem claimed the primary force consisted of D445 Battalion reinforced by one company of North Vietnamese from Headquarters Military Region 7 with a total of 720 men, while Hong said one battalion from the 275th Regiment had also been involved and that with D445 Battalion its total strength was 700 to 800 men. They believed an entire Australian battalion had been engaged along with two squadrons of APCs, and that it had been reinforced by a second battalion the following day, while there had been hundreds of Australian casualties, citing a BBC broadcast which reported 500 killed and 21 tanks destroyed. Against this, Kiem estimated total Viet Cong losses as approximately only 30, mainly from artillery fire. Hong agreed, stating the figure of 245 killed was exaggerated by a factor of 10. (Note: The D445 Battalion history which was published in 1991 admits to Viet Cong casualties at Long Tan of 33 killed and 80 wounded—including those sustained by the 275th Regiment—but also added "that they suffered heavy casualties" without quantifying that statement.) Estimated losses from D445 district-commander Colonel Bao stated information he had received at the time was that there was 150 losses including killed and captured for all units involved. Contradictory evidence is also given by the D-Company Commander, who stated he "didn't seen more than 50 bodies and I spent three days in the area."

Yet this was at odds with alleged Viet Cong records to have been captured by US forces of the diary of the 275th Regiment's commander listing that unit's losses as 500 dead. McNeill provides these figures based on the diaries of a future Deputy Defense Minister Nguyen Thoi Bung and overall battle commander; however, according to Earnest Chamberlain actual documentation of these diaries have not been corroborated. Captured soldiers later stated D445 Battalion's casualties had been 70 killed and 100 wounded. (Note: Total Viet Cong losses may have been even higher, with 1 ATF reportedly uncovering documents during Operation Marsden in 1969 which listed 878 killed, died of wounds or missing and 1,500 wounded.) These claims were directly contradicted by Australian intelligence reports in which the D245 Unit suffered just 30 casualties. Claims were also contradicted by the Dong Nai history which stated both the 275th Regiment and D445 Battalion had been involved. Indeed, the majority of the dead buried after the battle were wearing green uniforms, and this coupled with their weapons and equipment, indicated they were either main force Viet Cong or North Vietnamese.

One of the three prisoners was from D445 Battalion and the other two were North Vietnamese who claimed to be from the 45th Regiment, perhaps unaware their unit had changed its name to the 275th Regiment when operating in the south. According to them it was the artillery battalion of this regiment which had bombarded Nui Dat. Years later many of Kiem's claims about the role of D445 Battalion were found to be misleading. (Note: When questioned by McNeill in 1988 Kiem had implied that he had commanded D445 Battalion during Long Tan and that it had played the leading role in the battle; however, this was later found to not be accurate. Although he had commanded D445 Battalion after Long Tan he had not done so during the fighting, while the unit had in fact been subordinate to the Viet Cong 275th Regiment during the battle.)

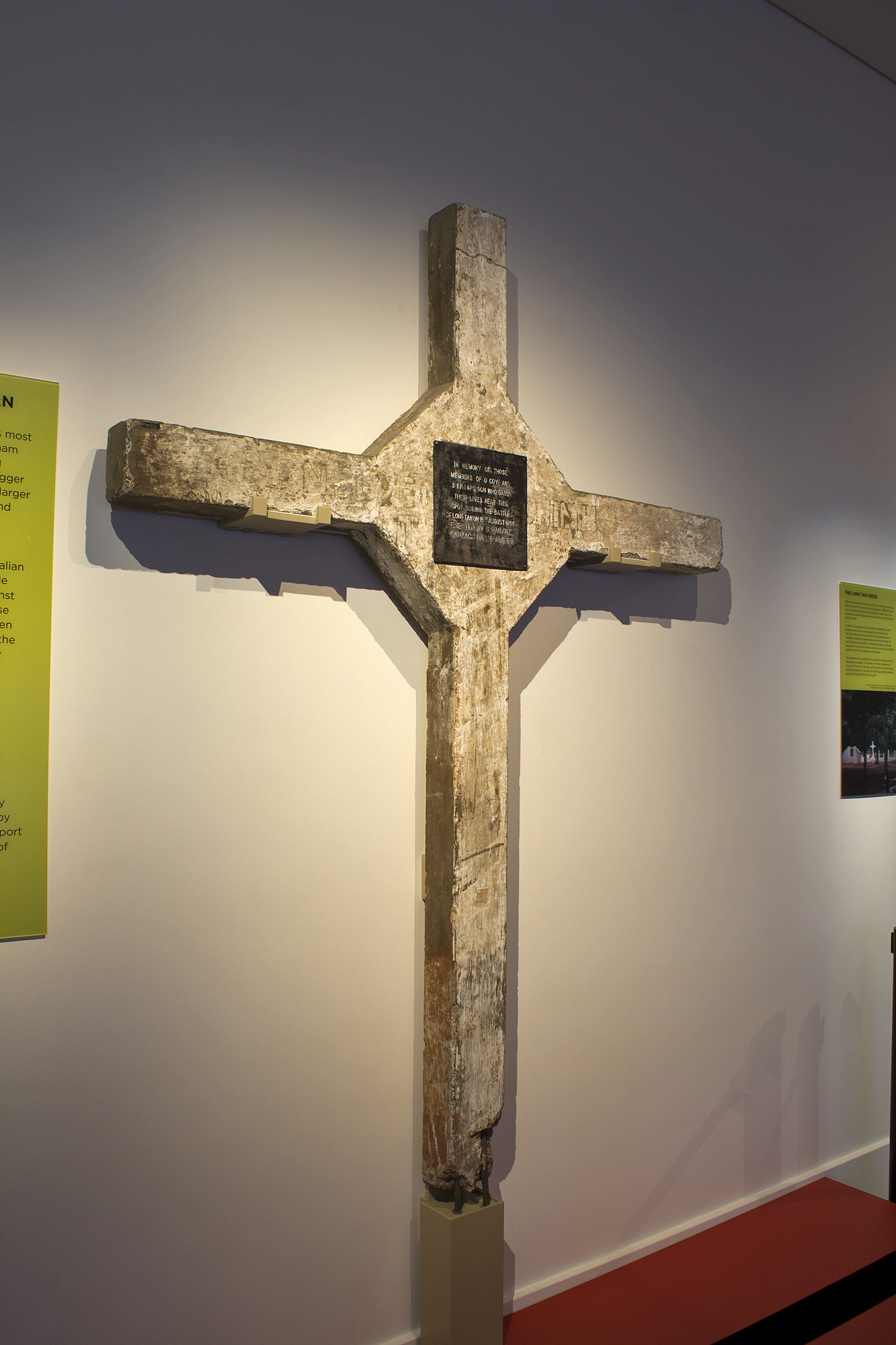
The Long Tan Cross, commemorating Australian losses

Both Kiem and Hong claimed the plan had been to mortar Nui Dat to draw a reaction force into an ambush, not to attack the base. They confirmed the dual military and political aim, emphasising the disruption caused by 1 ATF lodging at Nui Dat and the intention to affect Australian public opinion. The forced evacuation of Long Tan and Long Phuoc had curtailed the Viet Cong who regarded it as a liberated area, and it was chosen as the ambush site to demonstrate to the local population that they were still able to operate despite the Australian presence. Hong explained the ambush was sprung within range of the artillery at Nui Dat because they correctly assumed no reaction force would move outside the cover it provided, and instead planned on rapidly closing with and destroying it before artillery or air support could be brought in. They planned to occupy prepared positions in the rubber plantation and destroy whatever force was sent to locate the mortars following the attack on Nui Dat. A stop force had been placed to the east, while another was to the south to hold the Australians in place, reasoning that the thick undergrowth to the north would force them between the two. D445 Battalion was then to close the rear of the ambush, attacking from the north-west. A larger ambush would then have been staged outside artillery range along the withdrawal route subsequently used by the 275th Regiment. Meanwhile, the 274th Regiment was positioned north of Binh Ba astride Route 2 to ambush US forces should they try to relieve 1 ATF. (Note: Allied intelligence later confirmed the 274th Regiment had been located between Ngai Giao and the northern provincial border on 18 August and moved west into the Hat Dich after Long Tan.) Hong later asked: "How can you claim a victory when you allowed yourselves to walk into a trap that we had set? Admittedly we did not finish the job, but that was only because time beat us and your reinforcements arrived. I mean you did not even attempt to follow us up. How can you claim a significant victory from that sort of behaviour?"

While the plan outlined by Hong had many of the components of an annihilation ambush, and drawing the enemy out his base area was a standard communist tactic, several weaknesses were evident, including the lack of a means of neutralising the Australian artillery, the absence of indirect fire weapons in the ambush, and the comparatively small size of the ambushing force. Equally the plan to site a second ambush outside artillery range would have been ineffective as the Australians were unlikely to proceed that far unless their guns had followed. Hong believed the ambush failed because the soldiers at the front fired on 11 Platoon before the entire Australian force entered the killing zone, while it should have been opened from the rear against 12 Platoon. Had D Company been attacked from the rear the battle would have been more like an ambush, and they would have been in immediate danger, while it would likely have been irrelevant if the forward Viet Cong troops fired first as the Australians were already well into the plantation. Yet they had been unable to co-ordinate such a manoeuvre and D445 Battalion had more than three hours from the initial contact to close the gap at the rear and failed to do so. Regardless, a few issues cast doubt on this version of events. Firstly, if the Viet Cong had been in the plantation on 17 and 18 August preparing an ambush they would likely have been identified by the patrols from A or B Company, 6 RAR. Secondly, the alleged size of the force is questionable as just 700 men would have been insufficient to be certain of success, while according to communist doctrine it would have required more than a regiment to achieve overwhelming force. In the end the reaction of the Viet Cong indicted they had not detected D Company's presence in the rubber plantation until the first clash with 11 Platoon.

In 2005, Nguyen Nam Hung—deputy commander 274th Regiment—claimed the Viet Cong had indeed intended to destroy 1 ATF and liberate Ba Ria province. He stated that a two-phased offensive had been conceived, planning first to draw them into the open and destroy them in an ambush, and then attack the weakened base at Nui Dat. Ultimately though their goal had been political and the capture of Nui Dat was not considered important. According to the official D445 Battalion history, the officers of the units involved met in early August to finalise plans for the attack. The account claimed that following the mortar attack on 16/17 August, the force had formed up in a 3-kilometre (1.9 mi) wide semi-circle at 10:15 on 18 August to lie in wait, with the 275th Regiment given the "middle battle" position and tasked with springing the ambush, while other units from the 275th Regiment and one company from D445 Battalion occupied the "front block" position near the village of Long Tan, and two companies from D445 Battalion under command of Major Sau Thu had been tasked with occupying the "back block" position to encircle the Australians by sweeping beneath their "tail" and destroying them. In support, the 80-strong Vo Thi Sau militia company, most of them women, was located nearby to help drag away the wounded following the battle. Thu later confirmed he had been ordered to lure the Australians out of Nui Dat, kill as many as possible, capture their weapons, and overrun the base. Yet this explanation also contains inconsistencies. In particular, the delay of over a day between the mortar attack and the battle suggests another purpose, and it is possible it may have served to test the Australian reaction and the speed with which counter-battery fire could be directed against them in preparation for a full-scale attack.

== Conclusion ==
While Vietnamese sources maintain an ambush was planned at Long Tan, whether they also intended attacking Nui Dat remains uncertain. The fact a large Viet Cong force had not been identified in the area before midday on 18 August suggests no such force was there, and consequently it could not have been occupying an ambush position awaiting the arrival of the reaction force from Nui Dat. Despite this, it seems likely the 5th Division had planned an ambush but were ill-prepared due to a lack of co-ordination between the morning of 17 August and the selection and occupation of the intended site. As a result, they appear to have been unready when D Company entered the plantation and were likely somewhere on its eastern edge instead. The Viet Cong were probably still conducting their reconnaissance and establishing the ambush in the vicinity of where the rubber met the jungle when the battle occurred, while the Australians may have upset their plan by moving faster than the ARVN and US troops they had previously fought. What followed then appears to have been an encounter battle as the two advancing forces clashed on open ground in a meeting engagement. An alternative explanation is that D Company approached from an unexpected direction, physically dislocating the ambush. Indeed, Thu stated "...we didn't know how many... [the Australians] had in Nui Dat. We tried to draw them out... We thought they would go one way but... [they] went the wrong way and came behind us." In July 2006, David Sabben—platoon commander 12 Platoon—and Bob Buick—platoon sergeant 11 Platoon—visited the battlefield for a television story on 60 Minutes, where they met Nguyen Minh Ninh, former vice-commander D445 Battalion. Minh told them: "You won. But we won also. Tactically and militarily you won—but politically, we won. In this battle you acted out of our control—you [escaped] from our trap." According to journalist Cameron Stewart it was the first time a senior North Vietnamese officer had admitted being defeated at Long Tan.

== See also ==
- Battle of Long Tan order of battle

== Notes ==
Footnotes

Citations

=== Sources ===
- Anon. (n.d.). "Being a historian: Investigating the Battle of Long Tan". Archived from the original on 23 March 2015.
- Burstall, Terry (1990). A Soldier Returns: A Long Tan Veteran Discovers the Other Side of Vietnam. St Lucia, Queensland: University of Queensland Press. ISBN 0702222526.
- Chamberlain, Ernest (2016). The Viet Cong D445 Battalion: Their Story (and the Battle of Long Tan). Point Lonsdale, Victoria: Ernest Chamberlain. ISBN 9780980562347.
- Coulthard-Clark, Chris (2001). The Encyclopaedia of Australia's Battles (2nd ed.). Crows Nest, New South Wales: Allen and Unwin. ISBN 1865086347.
- Davies, Bruce; McKay, Gary (2012). Vietnam: The Complete Story of the Australian War. Sydney: Allen and Unwin. ISBN 978-1741750287.
- Dennis, Peter; Grey, Jeffrey; Morris, Ewan; Prior, Robin; Bou, Jean (2008). The Oxford Companion to Australian Military History (2nd ed.). Melbourne: Oxford University Press. ISBN 978-0195517842.
- Ham, Paul (2007). Vietnam: The Australian War. Sydney: Harper Collins. ISBN 978-0732282370.
- Horner, David, ed. (2008). Duty First: A History of the Royal Australian Regiment (2nd ed.). Crows Nest, New South Wales: Allen and Unwin. ISBN 978-1741753745.
- McAulay, Lex (1986). The Battle of Long Tan: The Legend of Anzac Upheld. London: Arrow Books. ISBN 0099525305.
- McGibbon, Ian (2010). New Zealand's Vietnam War: A History of Combat, Commitment and Controversy. Auckland: Exisle. ISBN 978-0908988969.
- McNeill, Ian (1993). To Long Tan: The Australian Army and the Vietnam War 1950–1966. The Official History of Australia's Involvement in Southeast Asian Conflicts 1948–1975. Vol. 2. St Leonards, New South Wales: Allen and Unwin. ISBN 1863732829.
- Murdoch, Lindsay (21 April 2016). "Fifty years after the Battle of Long Tan, the truth is still elusive". The Sydney Morning Herald.
- Pennells, Steve (14 August 2006). "We Lost Battle, Says VC Officer". The West Australian. Perth: Seven West Media. p. 14.
- Stewart, Cameron (5–6 August 2006). "The Ghosts of Long Tan". The Weekend Australian. Sydney: News Limited. pp. 18–23. Archived from the original on 4 June 2011 – via news.com.au.
- Taylor, Jerry (2001). Last Out: 4 RAR/NZ (ANZAC) Battalion's Second Tour in Vietnam. Crows Nest, New South Wales: Allen and Unwin. ISBN 1865085618.
