= Official History of Australian Peacekeeping, Humanitarian and Post-Cold War Operations =

Six-volume Australian official history

- Cover of Volume II, Australia and the 'New World Order': From Peacekeeping to Peace Enforcement, 1988–1991
- Author: David Horner (general editor)
- Language: English
- Genre: Official history military history
- Publisher: Cambridge University Press
- Publication date: 2011–2019
- Publication place: Australia
- Preceded by: The Official History of Australia's Involvement in Southeast Asian Conflicts 1948–1975
- Followed by: Official History of Australian Operations in Iraq and Afghanistan, and Australian Peacekeeping Operations in East Timor

The Official History of Australian Peacekeeping, Humanitarian and Post-Cold War Operations is the official history of Australia's military and civilian involvement in peacekeeping since 1947 as well as military operations in the years after the end of the Cold War. The series, comprising six volumes, was jointly produced by the Australian War Memorial and Australian National University, with Professor David Horner serving as its general editor.

== Volumes ==
Volume 1: The Long Search for Peace (1947–2006)
Published by Cambridge University Press in 2019 and written by Peter Londey, Rhys Crawley and David Horner, Covers peacekeeping and observer missions between 1947 and 2006, including Indonesia, Kashmir, the Middle East, the Congo, Cyprus, and Rhodesia/Zimbabwe.

Volume 2: Australia and the New World Order (1988–1991)
Published by Cambridge University Press in 2011 and written by David Horner. Covers peace operations between 1988 and 1991 including Namibia, Iran, Pakistan and Afghanistan, the Persian Gulf and Kuwait.

Volume 3: The Good International Citizen (1991–1993)
Published by Cambridge University Press in 2014 and written by David Horner and John Connor. Covers peacekeeping in Asia, Africa and Europe between 1991 and 1993 including Iraq (humanitarian operations, sanctions, and weapons inspection) Cambodia, Western Sahara and former Yugoslavia.

Volume 4: The Limits of Peacekeeping (1992–2005)
Published by Cambridge University Press in 2019 and written by Jean Bou, Bob Breen, David Horner, Garth Pratten and Miesje de Vogel. Covers peacekeeping missions between 1992 and 2005, including Somalia, Mozambique, Rwanda, Haiti, Eritrea, Guatemala, Sierra Leone and Sudan.

Volume 5: The Good Neighbour (1980–2006)
Published by Cambridge University Press in 2016 and written by Bob Breen. Covers peace support operations in the Pacific Islands between 1980 and 2006, including Bougainville, Solomon Islands, and other deployments.

Volume 6: In Their Time of Need (1918–2006)
Published by Cambridge University Press in 2017. Written by Steven Bullard to cover overseas emergency relief operations between 1918 and 2006, including Papua New Guinea, Sumatra, Pakistan, Iran, and various Pacific nations.

== Development and publication ==
In 2002 the Australian War Memorial (AWM) engaged Professor David Horner to investigate the feasibility of developing an official history of Australian peacekeeping activities. The Howard government subsequently approved this project in 2004, and appointed Horner to be the official historian. However, it did not allocate any funding for the series. An arrangement was eventually negotiated whereby the Department of Defence paid Horner's salary, and the AWM and Australian Research Council also contributed funds to cover other costs.

Volume II, entitled Australia and the 'New World Order': From Peacekeeping to Peace Enforcement, 1988–1991, was the first work in the series to be published and was released in February 2011. The book was officially launched by Foreign Minister and former Prime Minister Kevin Rudd on 11 April. Volume III, The Good International Citizen: Australian Peacekeeping in Asia, Africa and Europe 1991–1993, was published in 2014 and launched by Minister for Defence David Johnston on 2 July that year.

The completion of the series experienced delays, with Horner attributing this to a shortage of funding. By 2014 all the funding for the project had been spent, and Volume V, The Good Neighbour: Australian Peace Support Operations in the Pacific Islands 1980–2006, had been awaiting clearance by government agencies since 2011. Volume VI, In Their Time of Need: Australian Overseas Emergency Relief Operations, was completed in 2015. That year, the Department of Defence provided additional funding for the project after being encouraged to do so by Prime Minister Tony Abbott. After this money became available, work on the two remaining volumes resumed and they were scheduled to be published in 2016. Volume V was published in July 2016.

From an early stage in the project Horner sought to have an additional volume added to the series covering Australia's involvement in peacekeeping operations in East Timor, as well as the War in Afghanistan and Iraq War. The AWM eventually commissioned a study into the feasibility of an official history of these engagements in 2011, which Horner completed in 2012. However, efforts to gain government approval for the project were delayed by the two changes in the prime ministership during 2013. A separate series was eventually authorised by the Abbott government in April 2015, and $12.8 million was allocated to the AWM for the Official History of Australian Operations in Iraq and Afghanistan, and Australian Peacekeeping Operations in East Timor as part of the 2015–16 federal budget.
