= David Horner =

Australian military historian and academic

David Horner AM, FASSA
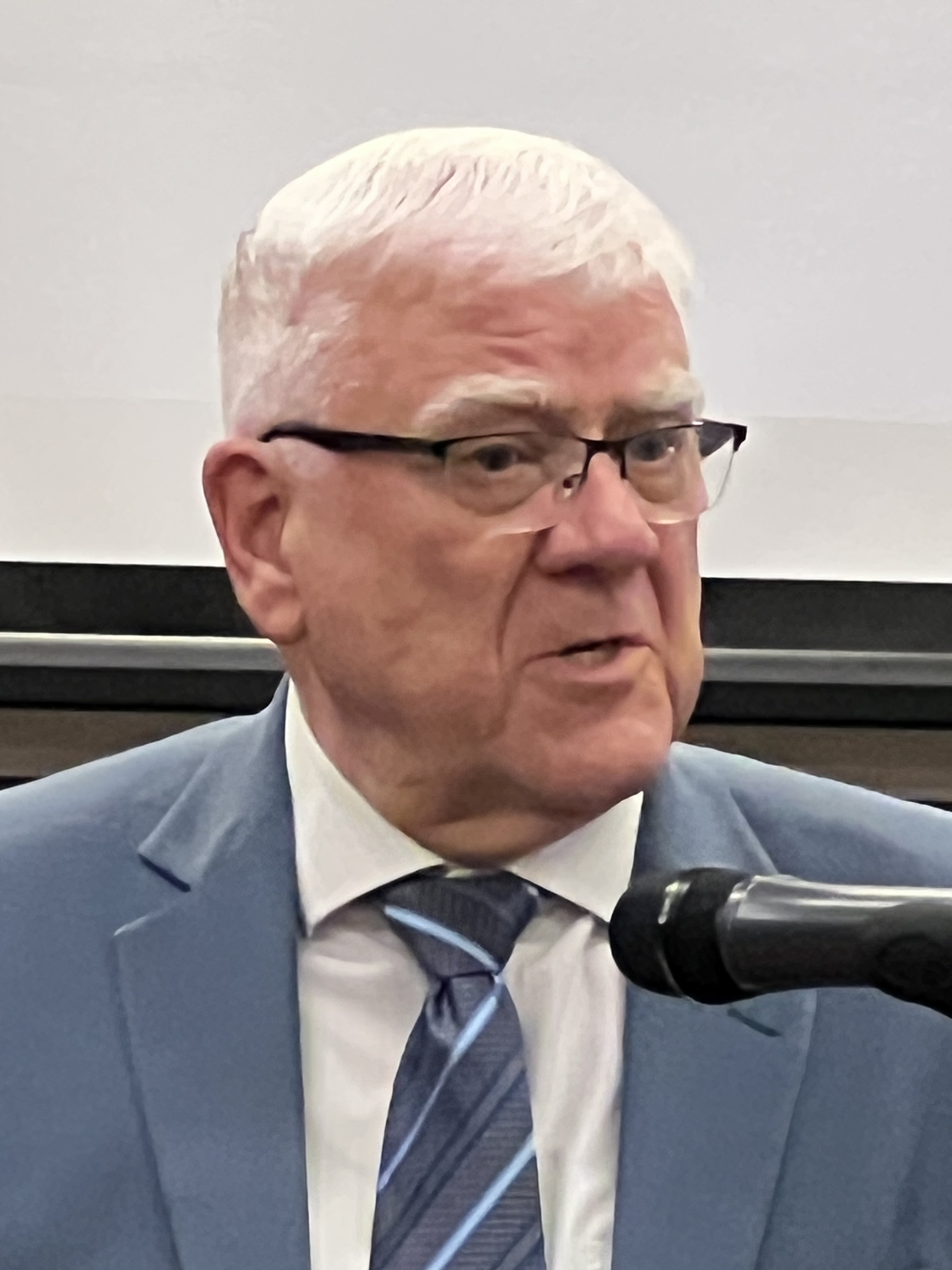
- David Horner speaking at an event in 2025
- Born: 12 March 1948 (age 78); Adelaide, South Australia
- Awards: Churchill Fellowship (1977); Member of the Order of Australia (2009); Fellow of the Academy of the Social Sciences in Australia (2015); Prime Minister's Literary Award for Australian History (2015); St Ermin's Hotel Intelligence Book of the Year Award (2015)

Academic background
- Education: Flinders University (MA); University of New South Wales (MA [Hons]); Australian National University (PhD)
- Thesis: Australia and Allied Strategy in the Pacific, 1941–1946 (1980)
- Doctoral advisor: Robert O'Neill

Academic work
- Institutions: Australian National University
- Main interests: Australian military history Strategic studies
- Notable works: The Official History of ASIO; Official History of Australian Peacekeeping, Humanitarian and Post-Cold War Operations

David Murray Horner, AM, FASSA (born 12 March 1948) is an Australian military historian and academic.

== Early life and military career ==
Horner was born in Adelaide, South Australia, on 12 March 1948. He was raised in a military household—his father, Murray Horner, had served in New Guinea during the Second World War. Like Murray, Horner attended Prince Alfred College. Horner was a prefect and served on numerous committees including the yearbook, debating, cadets, and student christian movement. He later joined the Citizen Military Forces and then the Australian Army after completing school in 1966. On graduating from the Royal Military College, Duntroon in 1969, he was commissioned a lieutenant in the Royal Australian Infantry Corps. In 1971, Horner served an eight-month tour in Vietnam as a platoon commander in the 3rd Battalion, Royal Australian Regiment. He was a visiting fellow with the Department of History at the Australian Defence Force Academy from 1985 to 1988, and a member of the directing staff at the Joint Services Staff College in 1988 to 1990. Horner retired from the full-time army in 1991 on gaining a position with the Australian National University (ANU) and transferred to the Australian Army Reserve, with which he served for more than a decade. He was the inaugural commanding officer of the Land Warfare Studies Centre (1998–2002), and retired with the rank of colonel.

Horner has a Diploma of Military Studies from Duntroon, a Master of Arts (Honours) from the University of New South Wales, and graduated with a Doctor of Philosophy from the ANU in 1980. His doctoral thesis, supervised by Robert O'Neill and completed while a serving major in the army, concerned Australian and Allied strategy in the Pacific War and formed the basis for his second book, High Command: Australia and Allied Strategy, 1939–1945 (1982).

== Historian and academic ==
Horner was appointed to a position at the ANU's Strategic and Defence Studies Centre in 1990. In 1998 he was described as "one of Australia's most respected military historians", and in 1999 was made Professor of Australian Defence History at the ANU's Research School of Pacific and Asian Studies (later the Coral Bell School of Asia Pacific Affairs); a role he served in until 2014.

In 2004 Horner was appointed the Official Historian and general editor for the Official History of Australian Peacekeeping, Humanitarian and Post-Cold War Operations, a six-volume history covering Australia's involvement in international peacekeeping operations from 1947 to 2006. Horner authored or co-authored the second and third volumes: Australia and the 'New World Order' (2011) and, with John Connor, The Good International Citizen (2014). A team led by Horner also won a tender to write the official history of the Australian Security Intelligence Organisation (ASIO). The three-volume series, which traces the first forty years of ASIO's history from 1949 to 1989, was led by Horner's The Spy Catchers (2014). John Blaxland's The Protest Years followed in 2015, and Blaxland and Rhys Crawley's The Secret Cold War in 2016. The Spy Catchers jointly won the Prime Minister's Literary Award for Australian History, was sole winner of the St Ermin's Hotel Intelligence Book of the Year Award, and was long-listed for the Council for the Humanities, Arts and Social Sciences Australia Prize for a Book in 2015. Horner also undertook a feasibility study in 2012 into what eventually became the Official History of Australian Operations in Iraq and Afghanistan, and Australian Peacekeeping Operations in East Timor.

Horner has written or edited 32 books and more than 75 journal articles, reports and chapters in books. In 2009, he was appointed a Member of the Order of Australia for his "service to higher education in the area of Australian military history and heritage as a researcher, author and academic." Horner retired from full-time academia in 2014, and was appointed an emeritus professor at the ANU. He was made a Fellow of the Academy of the Social Sciences in Australia in 2015.

== Bibliography ==
=== Books ===
- — (1978). Crisis of Command: Australian Generalship and the Japanese Threat, 1941–1943. Canberra: Australian National University Press. ISBN 9780708113455.
- — (1982). High Command: Australia and Allied Strategy, 1939–1945. Sydney: George Allen & Unwin. ISBN 9780868610764.
- — (1991). SAS Phantoms of the Jungle: A History of the Australian Special Air Service. Sydney: Allen & Unwin. ISBN 9781863730075.
- — (1992). General Vasey's War. Melbourne: Melbourne University Press. ISBN 9780522844627.
- — (1992). The Gulf Commitment: The Australian Defence Force's First War. Melbourne: Melbourne University Press. ISBN 0522845118.
- — (1995). The Gunners: A History of Australian Artillery. Sydney: Allen & Unwin. ISBN 9781863739177.
- — (1996). Inside the War Cabinet: Directing Australia's War Effort, 1939–1945. Sydney: Allen & Unwin. ISBN 978-1863739689.
- —; Ball, Desmond (1998). Breaking the Codes: Australia's KGB Network. Sydney: Allen & Unwin. ISBN 9781864485783.
- — (1998). Blamey: The Commander-in-Chief. Sydney: Allen & Unwin. ISBN 9781864487343.
- — (2000). Defence Supremo: Sir Frederick Shedden and the Making of Australian Defence Policy. Sydney: Allen & Unwin. ISBN 978-1865082806.
- — (2001). Making the Australian Defence Force. The Australian Centenary History of Defence. Vol. 4. Melbourne: Oxford University Press. ISBN 9780195541175.
- — (2002). The Pacific. Second World War. Vol. 1. Oxford: Osprey Publishing. ISBN 978-1841762296.
- — (2005). Strategic Command: General Sir John Wilton and Australia's Asian Wars. Melbourne: Oxford University Press. ISBN 9780195552829.
- —; Thomas, Neil (2009). In Action with the SAS. Sydney: Allen & Unwin. ISBN 9781741755527.
- — (2011). Australia's Military History for Dummies. Milton, Queensland: Wiley Publishing Australia. ISBN 9781742169835.
- — (2011). Australia and the New World Order: From Peacekeeping to Peace Enforcement 1988–1991. Official History of Australian Peacekeeping, Humanitarian and Post-Cold War Operations. Vol. 2. Port Melbourne: Cambridge University Press. ISBN 9780521765879.
- —; Connor, John (2014). The Good International Citizen: Australian Peacekeeping in Asia, Africa and Europe 1991–1993. Official History of Australian Peacekeeping, Humanitarian and Post-Cold War Operations. Vol. 3. Port Melbourne: Cambridge University Press. ISBN 9781107021624.
- — (2014). The Spy Catchers. The Official History of ASIO. Vol. 1. Allen & Unwin. ISBN 9781743319666.
- —; Bou, Jean; Breen, Bob; Pratten, Garth; de Vogel, Miesje (2018). The Limits of Peacekeeping: Australian Missions in Africa and the Americas, 1992–2005. Official History of Australian Peacekeeping, Humanitarian and Post-Cold War Operations. Vol. 4. Port Melbourne: Cambridge University Press. ISBN 9781107101968.
- — (2022). The War Game: Australian War Leadership from Gallipoli to Iraq. Crows Nest, New South Wales: Allen & Unwin. ISBN 978-1-76106-595-8.
- Horner, David (2025). The Top Brass: Australian Generalship in the Second World War. Collingwood, Victoria: Hardie Grant. ISBN 978-1-76145-293-2.

=== Edited books ===
- —; O'Neill, Robert, eds. (1981). New Directions in Strategic Thinking. London: Allen & Unwin. ISBN 0043550134.
- —; O'Neill, Robert, eds. (1982). Australian Defence Policy for the 1980s. St. Lucia: University of Queensland Press. ISBN 0702217816.
- —, ed. (1984). The Commanders: Australian Military Leadership in the Twentieth Century. Sydney: Allen & Unwin. ISBN 9780868614960.
- —, ed. (1986). Australian Higher Command in the Vietnam War. Canberra: Strategic and Defence Studies Centre. ISBN 0867848936.
- —, ed. (1990). Duty First: The Royal Australian Regiment in War and Peace. Sydney: Allen & Unwin. ISBN 9780044422273.
  - —; Bou, Jean, eds. (2008). Duty First: A History of the Royal Australian Regiment (2nd ed.). Sydney: Allen & Unwin. ISBN 9780044422273.
- —, ed. (1991). Reshaping the Australian Army: Challenges for the 1990s. Canberra: Strategic and Defence Studies Centre. ISBN 0731511921.
- —; Ball, Desmond, eds. (1992). Strategic Studies in a Changing World: Global, Regional and Australian Perspectives. Canberra: Strategic and Defence Studies Centre. ISBN 0731513711.
- —; Penglase, Joanna, eds. (1992). When the War Came to Australia: Memories of the Second World War. St. Leonards: Allen & Unwin. ISBN 1863733205.
- —, ed. (1993). The Army and the Future: Land Forces in Australia and South-East Asia. Canberra: Directorate of Departmental Publications, Defence Centre for Director of Army Activities and Public Affairs. ISBN 0644290048.
- —, ed. (1994). The Battles That Shaped Australia: The Australian's Anniversary Essays. The Australian Series. Sydney: Allen & Unwin. ISBN 9781863737043.
- —, ed. (1995). Armies and Nation-Building: Past Experience – Future Prospects. Canberra: Strategic and Defence Studies Centre. ISBN 0731523008.
- —, ed. (2002). SAS Phantoms of War: A History of the Special Air Service. Sydney: Allen & Unwin. ISBN 9781865086477.
- —, ed. (2004). Australia's Strategic Involvement in the Middle East: An Overview. Abu Dhabi: Emirates Center for Strategic Studies and Research. ISBN 9789948006657.
- —; Londey, Peter; Bou, Jean, eds. (2009). Australian Peacekeeping: Sixty Years in the Field. Port Melbourne: Cambridge University Press. ISBN 9780521516068.
