= Battle of Long Tan order of battle =

This is an order of battle listing the Australian and Viet Cong forces involved in the Battle of Long Tan which occurred in Phuoc Tuy Province, South Vietnam on 18 August 1966.

== Australian forces ==
=== 1st Australian Task Force ===
==== Initial contact, 18 August 1966 ====
- D Company, 6 RAR (Major Harry Smith) – 108 men (including a three-man New Zealand artillery Forward Observation party)
- In support:
  - 1st Field Regiment, Royal Australian Artillery (Lieutenant Colonel Richmond Cubis)
    - 103rd Field Battery, RAA – 6 x 105 mm L5 Pack Howitzers
    - 105th Field Battery, RAA – 6 x 105 mm L5 Pack Howitzers
    - 161st Battery, Royal New Zealand Artillery – 6 x 105 mm L5 Pack Howitzers (Major Harry Honnor)
    - A Battery, US 2/35th Artillery Battalion – 6 x 155 mm M109 self-propelled howitzers (Captain Glen Eure)
  - No. 9 Squadron RAAF – 2 x UH-1B Iroquois helicopters (aerial resupply)
  - 3 x US F4 Phantoms (air support)
- Relief force consisting of:
  - A Company, 6 RAR (Captain Charles Mollison) – mounted
  - 3 Troop, 1st APC Squadron (Lieutenant Adrian Roberts) – 10 x M113 armoured personnel carriers
  - Headquarters B Company, 6 RAR and one platoon (Major Noel Ford) – on foot

==== Operation Smithfield, 19–22 August 1966 ====
- 6 RAR Battle Group (Lieutenant Colonel Colin Townsend)
  - Headquarters 6th Battalion, Royal Australian Regiment
  - A, B, C and D Company, 6 RAR
  - D Company, 5th Battalion, Royal Australian Regiment
- In support:
  - 1st APC Squadron (minus) – 2 x Troops of M113 armoured personnel carriers
  - 161st Reconnaissance Flight – Bell H-13 Sioux light observation helicopters
  - No. 9 Squadron RAAF – UH-1B Iroquois helicopters

== Viet Cong forces ==
=== 5th Division ===
- Headquarters 5th Division (Colonel Nguyen Thanh Hong) – in total 1,500 to 2,500 men (Note: In 1966 Phuoc Tuy Province was part of the Viet Cong Military Region 1 (MR 1). North Vietnam had a separate numbering system with Phuoc Tuy being part of Military Region 7 (MR 7). In 1971 the VC MR1 was renamed MR 7.)
  - 275th Regiment (Senior Captain Nguyen Thoi Bung a.k.a. Ut Thoi) – 1,400 men (three battalions)
  - D445 Provincial Mobile Battalion (Bui Quang Chanh a.k.a. Sau Chanh) – 350 men (at least two companies, including C4 weapons company) (Note: 1 ATF intelligence believed Sau Chanh commanded the battalion in August 1966; however, following interviews with former PAVN officers in 1988, the Australian official historian concluded Nguyen Van Kiem had done so. Yet according to the D445 Battalion history published in 1991 Chanh was in fact the unit's first commander, while Kiem commanded the Chau Duc District Company during Long Tan and only took over the battalion in early 1968.)
  - One regular North Vietnamese Army battalion – suspected (Note: While McNeill states that 275th Regiment had been reinforced by at least one regular NVA battalion, recent research suggests no such unit was present. The 275th Regiment was restructured in May 1966, incorporating the North Vietnamese D605 Battalion as its third battalion (which had been disbanded).)
  - Vo Thi Sau militia company – 80 personnel, mostly women (battlefield clearance and casualty evacuation)

The final evaluation of the forces confronting D Company, 6 RAR included those in depth and is based on post-battle estimates derived from battle analysis, intelligence reports, captured documents and the interrogation of captured Viet Cong personnel. Although initial estimates of the Viet Cong force ranged from several companies to a battalion, following the battle Australian intelligence assessed it as having totalled between 1,500 and 2,500 men, while 1,000 men were believed to have directly engaged D Company. (Note: Some Vietnamese sources have previously claimed that the force was much smaller, and was between 700 and 800 men. These figures were given by Nguyen Van Kiem—who had commanded D445 Battalion after the fighting at Long Tan, but not during the battle—when questioned by McNeill in 1988; however, much of the information provided by him was later found to be misleading.) During the battle the division's second main force regiment, 274th Regiment had likely been occupying a position north of Binh Ba astride Route 2 to ambush a squadron from US 11th Armored Cavalry Regiment which they anticipated would attempt to relieve 1 ATF. Allied intelligence later confirmed it subsequently moved west into the Hat Dich after the failure at Long Tan.

== See also ==
- Assessment of the Battle of Long Tan
- Long Tan Cross

== Notes ==
Footnotes

Citations
