= Craig Stockings =

Australian historian

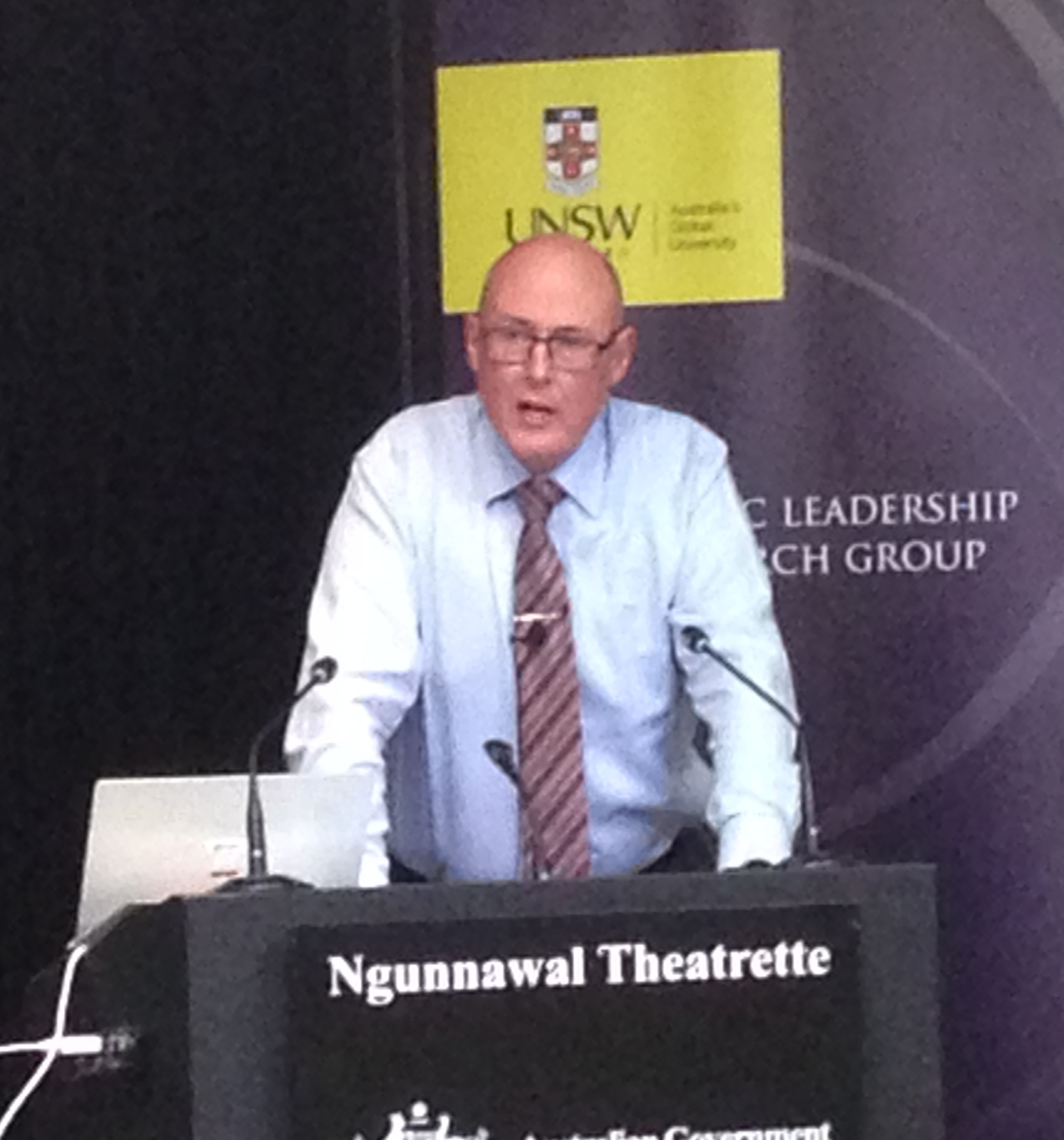
- Born: 1974 (age 51–52); Sydney, New South Wales
- Awards: C.E.W. Bean Prize for Military History (2007)

Academic background
- Education: University of New South Wales (BA [Hons], PhD); Monash University (GradDipEd); Deakin University (MEd, MA)
- Thesis: The Torch and the Sword: A History of the Army Cadet Movement in Australia, 1866–2004 (2006)
- Doctoral advisor: Jeffrey Grey

Academic work
- Institutions: Australian War Memorial; University of New South Wales, Canberra
- Main interests: Military and defence history
- Notable works: Official History of Australian Operations in Iraq and Afghanistan, and Australian Peacekeeping Operations in East Timor

Craig Anthony John Stockings (born 1974) is an Australian historian with research interests in military and defence history. Since 2016, Stockings has been Official Historian and general editor of the Official History of Australian Operations in Iraq and Afghanistan, and Australian Peacekeeping Operations in East Timor, based at the Australian War Memorial in Canberra. Prior to this appointment, Stockings was an officer in the Australian Army and professor of history at the University of New South Wales, Canberra, working out of the Australian Defence Force Academy.

== Early life and military career ==
Stockings was born in Sydney, New South Wales, in 1974. At 18 he entered the Australian Defence Force Academy (ADFA) as an Australian Army officer cadet. Graduating in 1995 with a Bachelor of Arts in History and Politics, he completed his final year of study as an officer cadet at the Royal Military College, Duntroon and was commissioned into the Royal Australian Infantry Corps in 1996. Stockings returned to ADFA the following year to undertake an Honours degree in History, following which he was posted to the 3rd Battalion, Royal Australian Regiment (3RAR) in 1998. With 3RAR he deployed as part of the International Force East Timor in 1999–2000.

On his return from East Timor, Stockings completed a Graduate Diploma of Education at Monash University and read for a Master of Arts in International Relations at Deakin University, graduating with both in 2001. His next posting was to Headquarters Training Command as a staff officer in 2001–02. Appointed aide-de-camp to the Governor-General of Australia in 2003, Stockings graduated from Deakin with a Master of Education the same year and in 2004 was reposted to ADFA as a staff officer. At this time Stockings embarked on a Doctor of Philosophy degree in History through the University of New South Wales, Canberra. His doctoral thesis, supervised by Jeffrey Grey, was a history of the Army Cadet movement in Australia from 1866 to 2004. He graduated with the doctorate in 2006, and his thesis was later revised and published as The Torch and the Sword with UNSW Press in 2007. Stockings' thesis was also awarded the C.E.W. Bean Prize for Military History by the Australian Army History Unit.

== Academic career ==
While nearing the end of his doctorate, Stockings left the army and, in 2006, was appointed a lecturer in history and strategic studies at the University of New South Wales, Canberra. In 2007, he received a research grant, the Margaret George Award, from the National Archives of Australia to begin work on his next project—an operational history of the Battle of Bardia, the first battle in which the Australian Army fought in the Second World War. The result was a book, Bardia: Myth, Reality and the Heirs of Anzac, published by UNSW Press in 2009. The volume was followed in 2011 by a shorter work, titled The Battle of Bardia, for the Australian Army History Unit's Army Campaigns Series. He was promoted to senior lecturer in history in 2008.

Following a series of edited volumes—Zombie Myths of Australian Military History (2010), Anzac's Dirty Dozen (2012) and, with John Connor, Before the Anzac Dawn (2013)—that sought to challenge or dispel dominant misconceptions in Australian military history, Stockings' next major research project delved into the Nazi German invasion of Greece during the Second World War with colleague Eleanor Hancock. The project was funded as part of a Discovery Grant of A$107,000 from the Australian Research Council in 2012, with the findings published as a book, Swastika over the Acropolis, with Brill in 2013. More recent projects include Britannia's Shield (Cambridge University Press, 2015), an analysis of British imperial defence in the late nineteenth and early twentieth centuries, and work on the International Force East Timor (INTERFET). Early research into the latter was funded by a 2015 Discovery Grant from the Australian Research Council worth A$140,344. By 2016 Stockings was an associate professor of history and deputy head of the School of Humanities and Social Science at the University of New South Wales, Canberra.

== Official historian ==
In 2015 the Abbott government authorised the Official History of Australian Operations in Iraq and Afghanistan, and Australian Peacekeeping Operations in East Timor, allocating A$12.6 million to the project which was to be based out of the Australian War Memorial in Canberra. The series was created to document Australian involvement in the peacekeeping initiatives in East Timor from 1999 to 2012, along with the operations in the Middle East as part of the War in Afghanistan (2001–present) and the Iraq War (2003–11). The position of Official Historian and general editor of the series, to be ongoing for six years, was advertised in June 2015. Stockings, by now already researching Australian operations in East Timor as part of INTERFET, applied for the position; his appointment was announced in February 2016. After negotiating a six-year unpaid leave of absence from the University of New South Wales, Stockings commenced as Official Historian in March.

Stockings' first task was to define the scope and structure of the series, and employ a team of authors and researchers. The structure as of March 2018 is a six-volume history, with two volumes dedicated to the operations in East Timor, three on Afghanistan, and one on Iraq. Stockings is to author the first of the East Timor volumes, covering the INTERFET operations, while five other historians—each assisted by a full-time researcher—have been employed to write the other books in the series. Writing in 2017, Stockings remarked that there were "significant differences" between his project and previous Australian official history series. The budget for the East Timor, Afghanistan and Iraq project is much larger than that afforded to previous histories, though as Stockings notes the timeline is also "extremely tight" and the series subject to "firm governance frameworks". The remit Stockings received from Prime Minister Malcolm Turnbull on accepting the appointment of Official Historian was clear that the history be delivered "by July 2022". The authors have five years to complete their respective volumes, with Stockings granted an additional twelve months to edit the series prior to publication.

In November 2019 it was reported that Stockings had threatened to resign as official historian due to his frustration over the large number of changes requested to the first volume on East Timor by the Department of Foreign Affairs and Trade (DFAT). The dispute over the book's content had delayed its publication. The book was eventually cleared by DFAT after a three year long process. The volume, entitled Born of Fire and Ash, was released in December 2022. An official launch was not held by the AWM, which Stockings described in February 2023 as being "unusual". The AWM told the ABC that a launch will take place at a later date.

== Bibliography ==
=== Author ===
- Stockings, Craig (2007). The Making and Breaking of the Post-Federation Army, 1901–09. Duntroon: Land Warfare Studies Centre. ISBN 9780642296665.
- — (2007). The Torch and the Sword: A History of the Army Cadet Movement in Australia. Sydney: UNSW Press. ISBN 9780868408385.
- — (2009). Bardia: Myth, Reality and the Heirs of Anzac. Sydney: UNSW Press. ISBN 9781921410253.
- — (2011). The Battle of Bardia. Canberra: Army History Unit. ISBN 9780987057457.
- —; Hancock, Eleanor (2013). Swastika over the Acropolis: Re-interpreting the Nazi Invasion of Greece in World War II. Leiden: Brill. ISBN 9789004254572.
- — (2015). Britannia's Shield: Lieutenant-General Sir Edward Hutton and the Late-Victorian Imperial Defence. Port Melbourne: Cambridge University Press. ISBN 9781107094826.
- — (2020). Letters from the Veldt: The Imperial Advance to Pretoria Through the Eyes of Edward Hutton and His Brigade of Colonials. Newport: Big Sky Publishing. ISBN 9781922265975.
- — (2022). Born of Fire and Ash : Australian Operations in Response to the East Timor Crisis 1999-2000. Sydney: NewSouth Publishing. ISBN 9781742236230.

=== Editor ===
- —, ed. (2010). Zombie Myths of Australian Military History. Sydney: UNSW Press. ISBN 9781742230795.
- —, ed. (2012). Anzac's Dirty Dozen: 12 Myths of Australian Military History. Sydney: NewSouth Publishing. ISBN 9781742232881.
- —; Connor, John, eds. (2013). Before the Anzac Dawn: A Military History of Australia to 1915. Sydney: NewSouth Publishing. ISBN 9781742233697.
- —; Connor, John, eds. (2017). The Shadow Men: The Leaders who Shaped the Australian Army from the Veldt to Vietnam. Sydney: NewSouth Publishing. ISBN 9781742234748.
