= The Official History of Australia's Involvement in Southeast Asian Conflicts 1948–1975 =

- Cover of Volume 9, Fighting to the Finish: The Australian Army and the Vietnam War 1968–1975
- Author: Peter Edwards (official historian) and nine other authors
- Language: English
- Genre: Official history Military history
- Publisher: Allen & Unwin in association with the Australian War Memorial
- Publication date: 1992–2012
- Publication place: Australia
- Preceded by: Australia in the Korean War 1950–53
- Followed by: Official History of Australian Peacekeeping, Humanitarian and Post-Cold War Operations

The Official History of Australia's Involvement in Southeast Asian Conflicts 1948–1975 covers Australia's involvement in the Malayan Emergency, Indonesia–Malaysia confrontation and Vietnam War. The series is an official history and was funded by the Australian Government and published by Allen & Unwin in association with the Australian War Memorial. Peter Edwards was appointed the official historian for the series in 1982. The series comprises nine volumes, which were published between 1992 and 2012. A single-volume summary of the series, Australia and the Vietnam War, was published in 2014.

The coverage of the effects of Agent Orange in volume 3 of the series has been criticised by some Australian veterans of the Vietnam War, who argue that it presented veterans who sought compensation as being dishonest. In 2015 the Australian War Memorial commissioned a book to consider the long-term effects of Agent Orange on veterans' health, as well other medical effects of the war.

== Publishing history ==
The nine volumes in the series are:

- Volume 1: Crises & Commitments: The Politics and Diplomacy of Australia's Involvement in Southeast Asian Conflicts 1948–1965 (1992) – Peter Edwards with Gregory Pemberton
- Volume 2: To Long Tan: The Australian Army and the Vietnam War 1950–1966 (1993) – Ian McNeill
- Volume 3: Medicine at War: Medical aspects of Australia's involvement in Southeast Asia 1950–1972 (1994) – Brendan G. O'Keefe and F.B. Smith
- Volume 4: The RAAF in Vietnam: Australian Air Involvement in the Vietnam War 1962–1975 (1995) – Chris Coulthard-Clark
- Volume 5: Emergency & Confrontation: Australian Military Operations in Malaya and Borneo 1950–1966 (1996) – Jeffrey Grey and Peter Dennis
- Volume 6: A Nation at War: Australian Politics, Society and Diplomacy during the Vietnam War 1965–1975 (1997) – Peter Edwards
- Volume 7: Up Top: The Royal Australian Navy in Southeast Asian Conflicts, 1955–1972 (1998) – Jeffrey Grey
- Volume 8: On the Offensive: The Australian Army in the Vietnam War 1967–1968 (2003) – Ian McNeill and Ashley Ekins
- Volume 9: Fighting to the Finish: The Australian Army and the Vietnam War 1968–1975 (2012) – Ashley Ekins with Ian McNeill

== See also ==
- Military history of Australia during the Malayan Emergency
- Military history of Australia during the Indonesia-Malaysia Confrontation
- Military history of Australia during the Vietnam War
