= 52nd Ranger Battalion (South Vietnam) =

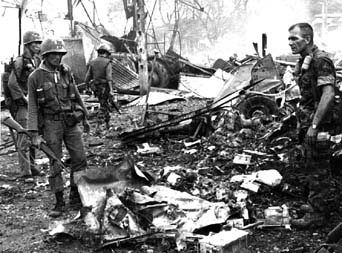
- Soldiers of the ARVN 52nd Ranger Battalion (left) and a U.S. Army advisor (right) in Đồng Xoài.
- Active: 1964–1975
- Allegiance: South Vietnam
- Branch: Army of the Republic of Vietnam
- Type: Light infantry
- Size: Battalion
- Part of: Vietnamese Rangers
- Engagements: Vietnam War
- Decorations: US Presidential Unit Citation

Commanders
- Notable commanders: Captain Vong Si Dau

The 52nd Ranger Battalion was a Vietnamese Rangers battalion of the Army of the Republic of Vietnam (ARVN) during the Vietnam War. To form the battalion, the 347th, 348th, 351st and 352nd independent ranger companies amalgamated in early 1964, at Mỹ Tho. Its commanding officer was Captain Vong Si Dau.

The Battalion played a part with other ARVN forces in the Battle of Đồng Xoài which took place in Phước Long Province between June 9 and 13, 1965.

On 11 November 1965, the battalion was augmented to the US 11th Armored Cavalry Regiment and conducted an air assault to relief a US element of the 11th ACR that had been ambushed by the VC 275th Regiment near Kim Hai hamlet, in the village of Phuoc Hoa on Route 15, in Phước Tuy Province and received a United States Presidential Unit Citation.

In addition to the first PUC, the unit was awarded a Valorous Unit Citation by the US for its actions at Suoi Long, Vietnam 27 June 1967 and processed for a second Presidential Unit Citation for the same action. The 52d BDQ was significantly engaged during Tet 1968, securing Xuân Lộc, clearing Ba Ria and participating in the subsequent clearance of Cholon and Biên Hòa.

After training with one of the New Zealand infantry companies of the 1st Australian Task Force in October and November 1969, 4/52 ARVN was deployed with the New Zealand company, and the Australians and New Zealanders of 6th Battalion, Royal Australian Regiment (6 RAR/NZ) in Operation Marsden on 3 December which was conducted in the Mây Tào Mountains. The operation resulted in an enormous success for 1 ATF wherein huge amounts of weapons, equipment and explosives were discovered as well as the discovery of the Viet Cong K76A Hospital which was the principal provider of medical services for all Communist forces in Phước Tuy and Long Khánh Provinces. 4/52 ARVN left the operation on 14 December and the Australians and New Zealanders concluded the operation on 28 December.

The battalion ceased to exist after the fall of Saigon on 30 April 1975.
