= Robert O'Neill (historian) =

Australian historian (1936–2023)

Robert O'Neill AO FASSA
- Born: 5 November 1936; Melbourne, Victoria
- Died: 19 April 2023 (aged 86); Blackheath, New South Wales
- Occupation: Professor
- Awards: Rhodes Scholarship (1961); Fellow of the Academy of the Social Sciences in Australia (1978); Officer of the Order of Australia (1988); Fellow of the Australian Institute of International Affairs (2008)

Academic background
- Education: Royal Military College, Duntroon; University of Oxford (MA, DPhil)
- Thesis: The Relationship between the German Army and the Nazi Party, 1933–9 (1965)
- Doctoral advisor: N. H. Gibbs

Academic work
- Institutions: University of Oxford (1987–01); International Institute for Strategic Studies (1982–87); Australian National University (1969–82); Royal Military College, Duntroon (1968–69)
- Doctoral students: David Horner
- Main interests: Military history Strategic studies
- Notable works: Australia in the Korean War 1950–53

Robert John O'Neill, AO, FASSA (5 November 1936 – 19 April 2023) was an Australian historian and academic. He served as the chair of the International Academic Advisory Committee at the United States Studies Centre at the University of Sydney, was director of the International Institute for Strategic Studies, based in London, from 1982 to 1987, and was Chichele Professor of the History of War at the University of Oxford from 1987 to 2000.

== Early life and education ==
O'Neill graduated from the Royal Military College, Duntroon in 1958, and from 1958 to 1969 served as an officer in the Australian Army. His service included a tour of the Vietnam War as a signals captain attached as the Intelligence Officer to the 5th Battalion, Royal Australian Regiment from 1966 to 1967, during which he was Mentioned in Despatches. In 1965, he completed his Doctor of Philosophy thesis at the University of Oxford on "The Relationship between the German Army and the Nazi Party, 1933–9" under the direction of one of his predecessors as Chichele Professor of the History of War, N. H. Gibbs. The research for O'Neill's thesis formed the basis for his first book, The German Army and the Nazi Party, 1933–1939, published in 1966.

== Academic career ==
O'Neill served as senior lecturer in history, Royal Military College, Duntroon, from 1968 to 1969. He was head of the Strategic and Defence Studies Centre at the Australian National University from 1971 to 1982, senior fellow in international relations, 1969–77, professorial fellow, 1977–82, Australian official historian of the Korean War from 1970 until 1982, director of the International Institute for Strategic Studies (1982–87), and Chichele Professor of the History of War at the University of Oxford (1987–2001).

O'Neill was the founding chairman of the Australian Strategic Policy Institute (2000–05). He was chair of the International Academic Advisory Committee at the United States Studies Centre, University of Sydney (2008–11). He was chairman of trustees of the Imperial War Museum, London, 1998–2001 (Trustee 1990–98). He was chairman of the Council of the International Institute for Strategic Studies, 1996–2001 (council member 1977–82, 1992–96).

O'Neill died in April 2023.

== Awards ==
- Officer of the Order of Australia, in the Australia Day Honours of 1988.
- Centenary Medal, in 2001.
- Fellow of the Australian Institute of International Affairs.
- Fellow of the Academy of Social Sciences in Australia.
- Fellow of the Institute of Engineers, Australia

== Published works ==
=== Author ===
- — (1966). The German Army and the Nazi Party, 1933–1939. London: Cassell.
- — (1968). Vietnam Task: The 5th Battalion, the Royal Australian Regiment, 1966/67. Melbourne: Cassell Australia.
- — (1968). Indo China Tragedy, 1945–1954. Melbourne: Cheshire.
- — (1969). General Giap: Politician and Strategist. North Melbourne: Cassell Australia. ISBN 9780304933754.
- — (1969). The Strategy of General Giap Since 1964. Canberra: Australian National University Press. ISBN 978-0708105351.
- — (1971). Peking-Hanoi Relations in 1970. Canberra: Australian National University Press. ISBN 978-0708105375.
- — (1972). The Army in Papua-New Guinea: Current Role and Implications for Independence. Canberra: Australian National University Press. ISBN 978-0708105368.
- —; McLean, Robyn (1972). Australia's Defence Capacity: A Compendium of Data. Canberra: Strategic and Defence Studies Centre.
- —; Tie, Jolika; Langtry, John (1978). Australia's Defence Resources: A Compendium of Data. Canberra: Strategic and Defence Studies Centre. ISBN 978-0908160006.
- —; Fielding, Jean (1978). A Select Bibliography of Australian Military History, 1891–1939. Canberra: Australian National University. ISBN 978-0908160037.
- — (1981). Strategy and Diplomacy. Australia in the Korean War 1950–53. Vol. 1. Canberra: Australian War Memorial and the Australian Government Publishing Service. ISBN 978-0642043290.
- — (1985). Combat Operations. Australia in the Korean War 1950–53. Vol. 2. Canberra: Australian War Memorial and the Australian Government Publishing Service. ISBN 978-0642043306.
- — (1985). Australia, Britain, and International Security: Retrospect and Prospect. London: Institute of Commonwealth Studies, University of London. ISBN 978-0902499416.
- — (1988). Alliances and International Order: An Inaugural Lecture Delivered before the University of Oxford on 20 November 1987. Oxford: Oxford University Press. ISBN 978-0199515561.
- — (1992). Security Challenges for Southeast Asia after the Cold War. Singapore: Institute of Southeast Asian Studies. ISBN 978-9813016439.
- — (2001). Australian-British Relations: The Strategic Connection. London: Menzies Centre for Australian Studies, University of London. ISBN 978-1855071179.

=== Editor ===
- The strategic nuclear balance: an Australian perspective, edited by O'Neill (1975)
- The Defence of Australia: fundamental new aspects, the proceedings of a conference organized by the Strategic and Defence Studies Centre, The Australian National University, October 1976, edited by O'Neill (1976)
- New directions in strategic thinking, edited by O'Neill and D.M. Horner (1981)
- Security in East Asia, edited by O'Neill (1984)
- The Conduct of East-West relations in the 1980s, edited by O'Neill (1985)
- New technology and western security policy, edited by O'Neill (1985)
- Doctrine, the Alliance and arms control, edited by O'Neill (1986)
- East Asia, the West and international security, edited by O'Neill (1987); ISBN 0-208-02204-X
- Hedley Bull on arms control, selected and introduced by O'Neill and David N. Schwartz (1987)
- Prospects for security in the Mediterranean, edited by O'Neill (1988); ISBN 0-208-02233-3
- The West and the Third World: essays in honour of J. D. B. Miller, edited by O'Neill and R.J. Vincent (1990); ISBN 0-333-43652-0
- Securing peace in Europe, 1945–62: thoughts for the post–Cold War era, edited by O'Neill and Beatrice Heuser (1992); ISBN 0-312-06217-6
- War, strategy, and international politics: essays in honour of Sir Michael Howard edited by O'Neill, Lawrence Freedman and Paul Hayes (1992); ISBN 0-19-822292-0
- Alternative nuclear futures: the role of nuclear weapons in the post–cold war world, edited by O'Neill and John Baylis (2000); ISBN 0-19-829624-X
- Boxall, Ron; O'Neill, Robert, eds. (2020). Vietnam Vanguard: The 5th Battalion's Approach to Counter-Insurgency, 1966. Canberra: ANU Press. doi:10.22459/VV.2019. ISBN 9781760463335.
