= Peter Edwards (historian) =

Australian diplomatic and military historian (born 1945)

- Born: 29 August 1945 (age 81); Watford, England
- Awards: Rhodes Scholarship (1967); Harkness Fellowship (1975); Foundation of Australian Literary Studies Award and H.T. Priestley Medal (1997); Member of the Order of Australia (2001); Queensland Premier's History Book Award (2006); Western Australian Premier's Book Award for Non-Fiction (2006); Fellow of the Australian Institute of International Affairs (2009)

Academic background
- Education: University of Western Australia (BA [Hons]); University of Oxford (DPhil)

Academic work
- Institutions: Australian War Memorial; University of Adelaide; Australian National University
- Main interests: Diplomatic history Military and defence history Vietnam War
- Notable works: The Official History of Australia's Involvement in Southeast Asian Conflicts 1948–1975

Peter Geoffrey Edwards, AM (born 29 August 1945) is an Australian diplomatic and military historian. Educated at the University of Western Australia and the University of Oxford, Edwards worked for the Department of Foreign Affairs, the Australian National University and the University of Adelaide before being appointed Official Historian and general editor of The Official History of Australia's Involvement in Southeast Asian Conflicts 1948–1975 in 1982. The nine-volume history was commissioned to cover Australia's involvement in the Malayan Emergency, Indonesia–Malaysia confrontation and Vietnam War. Edwards spent fourteen years at the Australian War Memorial (AWM) writing two of the volumes, while also researching, editing, and dealing with budget limitations and problems with staff turnover. Since leaving the AWM in 1996, Edwards has worked as a senior academic, scholar and historical consultant. In 2006 his book Arthur Tange: Last of the Mandarins won the Queensland Premier's History Book Award and the Western Australian Premier's Book Award for Non-Fiction.

== Early life and education ==
Edwards was born on 29 August 1945 in Watford, England, to Geoffrey and Joan Edwards. The family moved to Australia in 1950, where Peter was educated at Christ Church Grammar School, Perth. At school Edwards was head prefect, captain of debating and the shooting club and won prizes in English, Latin, French and athletics. He graduated from the University of Western Australia with a Bachelor of Arts with Honours, and in 1967 received a Rhodes Scholarship to undertake doctoral studies at Wadham College, Oxford.

== Career ==
On graduating from Oxford, Edwards was employed as a Historical Research Officer within the Department of Foreign Affairs from 1971. Here, he worked as an editor on the first three volumes of Documents on Australian Foreign Policy, 1937–49. The volumes, published between 1975 and 1979, dealt with the build-up towards and initial period of the Second World War. Edwards was awarded a Harkness Fellowship to Duke University in Durham, North Carolina, in 1975, and moved over to the Australian National University (ANU) as a research fellow in history later that year. In 1978 he was appointed to the University of Adelaide as Master of St. Mark's College. Work on his first authored history, Prime Ministers and Diplomats, was completed during this time. The book was published in 1983 by Oxford University Press.

=== Official historian ===
In 1982 Edwards, by now an established scholar of diplomatic history, was appointed Official Historian and general editor of The Official History of Australia's Involvement in Southeast Asian Conflicts 1948–1975. Based out of the Australian War Memorial (AWM) in Canberra, the multi-volume history was commissioned to cover Australia's involvement in the Malayan Emergency, Indonesia–Malaysia confrontation and Vietnam War. Edwards continued the tradition established by Charles Bean, Gavin Long and Robert O'Neill in Australia's earlier official war histories by adopting a holistic approach that sought to analyse the operational, strategic, political, social and medical aspects of the Australian experience. In dealing with twenty-seven years of history, the series spanned the longest period of an Australian official history commissioned to that time. The result was a nine-volume series, published between 1992 and 2012, with contributions from nine historians.

Edwards authored two of the volumes. Crises & Commitments (1992), written with Gregory Pemberton, analysed the political and diplomatic history of Australia's involvement in the three conflicts up to 1965, while A Nation at War (1997) covered the political, diplomatic and social history of Australia's Vietnam War from 1965 to 1975. Crises & Commitments received a somewhat contentious reception. John Murphy criticised the volume for what he saw as an overemphasis on the diplomatic and for skirting the social controversies of the Vietnam era; he also questioned the need for an official history. Pemberton, a senior researcher on the history who drafted several of the earlier chapters before leaving the project acrimoniously in 1990, took issue with the book as well, arguing that his input "had been censored and sanitised in the final product". Edwards acknowledged substantial rewrites to Pemberton's drafts in the foreword to Crises & Commitments, but the extent of and reasoning for the changes was not made clear. A Nation at War experienced a warmer reception, winning the Foundation of Australian Literary Studies Award and H. T. Priestley Medal. In spite of Murphy's doubts, the official history series was also "praised [for] its detached and scholarly analysis of complex events", according to the Oxford Companion to Australian Military History.

However, the project was not without its trials. Edwards' initial plan to employ a team of writers was thwarted by a lack of resources and funds. He instead had to enlist for some of the volumes historians based outside of the AWM, who agreed to work on the history without financial compensation. The series also experienced problems with staff turnover. Aside from Pemberton, the unexpected death in 1998 of Ian McNeill, author of the volumes on the Australian Army, caused extensive delays to the series' completion. The first seven volumes (including McNeill's To Long Tan [1993], dealing with army operations up to 1966), were delivered in a timely fashion and published successively from 1992 to 1998. However, McNeill's next volume was only partly written when he died. His research assistant, Ashley Ekins, was eventually appointed to complete the series. On the Offensive was published in 2003, while the final volume, Fighting to the Finish, appeared in 2012—two decades after the first volume, and sixteen years after Edwards' position at the AWM had ended. Again following the path of Bean and Long, Edwards was then commissioned by the AWM to write a single-volume summary of the series. Australia and the Vietnam War was published by NewSouth in 2014.

=== Senior scholar ===
On leaving the AWM in 1996, Edwards was appointed executive director of the Australian Centre for American Studies (1996–1998). He was a senior tutor at St Paul's College, University of Sydney in 1998, and from that year until 2005 was a senior consulting historian at the AWM. In 2001 Edwards was appointed a Member of the Order of Australia for his "service to the recording of Australia's military history" as Official Historian. Later that year he was a visiting scholar at the John Curtin Prime Ministerial Library, Curtin University, and made a visiting professor at the Australian Defence Force Academy, a position he held until 2008. Edwards' biography of public servant and diplomat Sir Arthur Tange was published in 2006. The book, Arthur Tange: Last of the Mandarins, had been supported by a 1999 Harold White Fellowship at the National Library of Australia, and went on to win the Queensland Premier's History Book Award and the Western Australian Premier's Book Award for Non-Fiction. He later edited Tange's memoirs for publication: Defence Policy-Making: A Close-Up View, 1950–1980 was released in 2008, seven years after Tange's death.

Edwards was made a Fellow of the Australian Institute of International Affairs in 2009. The following year he co-authored with Wendy Hillman A School with a View, a centenary history of his former high school, Christ Church Grammar. He has been an Honorary Professor at Deakin University since 2012 (a position he previously held from 1999 to 2005) and at the ANU since 2014. He is a previous contributing editor of the Australian Journal of International Affairs (2002–2008), and was a trustee of the Shrine of Remembrance from 2002 to 2009.

== Personal ==
Edwards has been married to Jacky Abbott since 20 September 1997, and has two daughters from a previous relationship. He describes his key interests as "reading", and lives in the Melbourne suburb of North Fitzroy.

== Bibliography ==
=== Author ===
- — (1983). Prime Ministers and Diplomats: The Making of Australian Foreign Policy, 1901–1949. Melbourne: Oxford University Press. ISBN 0-19-554389-0.
- —; Pemberton, Gregory (1992). Crises & Commitments: The Politics and Diplomacy of Australia's Involvement in Southeast Asian Conflicts 1948–1965. The Official History of Australia's Involvement in Southeast Asian Conflicts 1948–1975. Vol. 1. North Sydney: Allen & Unwin in association with the Australian War Memorial. ISBN 1-86373-184-9.
- — (1997). A Nation at War: Australian Politics, Society and Diplomacy during the Vietnam War 1965–1975. The Official History of Australia's Involvement in Southeast Asian Conflicts 1948–1975. Vol. 6. North Sydney: Allen & Unwin in association with the Australian War Memorial. ISBN 1-86448-282-6.
- — (2005). Permanent Friends?: Historical Reflections on the Australian-American Alliance. Double Bay, New South Wales: Lowy Institute for International Policy. ISBN 1-921004-18-5.
- — (2006). The Fall of Saigon, 1975. Canberra: National Archives of Australia and the Department of Foreign Affairs and Trade. ISBN 1-920807-39-X.
- — (2006). Arthur Tange: Last of the Mandarins. Crows Nest, New South Wales: Allen & Unwin. ISBN 1-74114-642-9.
- —; Hillman, Wendy (2010). A School with a View: A Centenary History of Christ Church Grammar School, Perth 1910–2010. Claremont, Western Australia: Christ Church Grammar School. ISBN 978-0-646-54373-4.
- — (2011). Robert Marsden Hope and Australian Public Policy. Kingston, Australian Capital Territory: Office of National Assessments. ISBN 978-0-646-56334-3.
- — (2014). Australia and the Vietnam War: The Essential History. Sydney: NewSouth. ISBN 978-1-74223-274-4.
- — (2015). Learning from History: Some Strategic Lessons from the 'Forward Defence' Era. Barton, Australian Capital Territory: Australian Strategic Policy Institute. ISBN 978-1-925229-06-6.

=== Editor ===
- —; Neale, R.G.; Kenway, H., eds. (1975). Documents on Australian Foreign Policy, 1937–49. Vol. 1: 1937–38. Canberra: Australian Government Publishing Service. ISBN 0-642-00994-5.
- —; Neale, R.G., eds. (1976). Documents on Australian Foreign Policy, 1937–49. Vol. 2: 1939. Canberra: Australian Government Publishing Service. ISBN 0-642-01243-1.
- —; Kenway, H.; Stokes, Henry, eds. (1979). Documents on Australian Foreign Policy, 1937–49. Vol. 3: January – June 1940. Canberra: Australian Government Publishing Service. ISBN 0-642-03655-1.
- —, ed. (1979). Australia through American Eyes, 1935–1945: Observations by American Diplomats. St. Lucia: University of Queensland Press. ISBN 0-7022-1365-9.
- —, ed. (2003). Facing North: A Century of Australian Engagement with Asia. Vol. 2: 1970s–2000. Melbourne: Melbourne University Press. ISBN 978-0-522-85024-6.
- Tange, Arthur (2008). — (ed.). Defence Policy-Making: A Close-Up View, 1950–1980. A Personal Memoir. Canberra: Australian National University Press. ISBN 978-1-921313-85-1.
