= 275th Regiment =

- Active: 1965–
- Allegiance: Vietnam
- Branch: National Liberation Front (until 1976); People's Army of Vietnam (1976-present)
- Type: Infantry
- Role: Guerrilla (until 1976); Regular infantry (1976-present)
- Size: Regiment
- Part of: 5th Infantry Division (Vietnam)
- Engagements: Vietnam War: Battle of Long Tan

The 275th Regiment, also known as 275 Viet Cong Main Force Regiment, was a regiment of the Viet Cong (VC) during the Vietnam War. The regiment was formed in May 1965.

== History ==
The 275th Regiment, with nickname "Cá Gô" 55 Regiment - was part of the VC 5th Division and operated in the Phuoc Tuy Province, now known as the province of Ba Ria-Vung Tau.

During the United States military intervention in Vietnam, the 275th Regiment took part in 280 minor and major clashes, shooting 84 enemy aircraft (including 3 US B-52s, 3 US AC-130s and 26 helicopters of all types) in the process.

On 11 November 1965, the Regiment ambushed the Army of the Republic of Vietnam (ARVN) 52nd Rangers near Kim Hai hamlet, in the village of Phuoc Hoa on Route 15, in Phuoc Tuy Province and inflicted heavy casualties upon the battalion.

Part of the Regiment fought initially against the 173rd Airborne Brigade between 24 May and 4 June 1966 during Operation Hardihood. American casualties during that operation were 23 killed and 160 wounded and 48 VC soldiers were reported to have been killed.

The Regiment or its battalions participated alongside D445 Provincial Mobile Battalion in the Battle of Long Tan against Australian forces from D Company, 6th Battalion, Royal Australian Regiment. According to the D445 Battalion political officer, the unit provided "guides for the units that mortared the Task Force" at Nui Dat base on 17 August 1966. A VC medic, Chung, reported that three of the 275th Regiment RCL detachment involved were killed in the Australian counter-battery fire and were buried nearby. Casualties among the Australians in the bombardment were 22 wounded. During the battle an 80-strong Vo Thi Sau civil labour company commanded by Chin Phuong, comprising mainly women and children, lent support by evacuating and treating the casualties. Vietnamese dead, according to VC and People's Army of Vietnam (PAVN) histories were 47 killed. Australian veterans and historians, in the main, claim that at Long Tan the 275 Regiment and D445 Battalion suffered heavy casualties, with the official Australian body count reported to be 245 PAVN/VC killed. Only one member of D445 was captured at Long Tan (reportedly a 57 mm RCL gunner); and two members of 275 Regiment were captured who declared themselves to be members of "Doan 45" as their cover story. Several 275th Regiment soldiers received medals, letters of appreciation and commendation certificates for their part in the fighting. Estimates from official history records from the D445 Battalion indicate between 30-47 killed in action including other regiments.

The next major contact took place on 2 December 1966, when a US resupply convoy of the 11th Armored Cavalry Regiment (11th ACR) was attacked by the 275th Regiment south of Gia Ray. In this battle, the U.S. forces involved claimed to have killed at least 99 VC soldiers, while a sergeant from the 27th Engineer Battalion was killed and 22 were wounded in the 11th ACR.

During the start of the Tet Offensive, the 274th and 275th Regiments of the 5th Division took part in the attacks on Bien Hoa, northeast of Saigon on 18 February 1968.

The 275th Regiment took later part in the attack on Svay Rieng city in Cambodia on 11 August 1974.

In November 2006, Australian Prime Minister John Howard paid respect to the Vietnamese authorities, laying a wreath at the Go Cat Military Cemetery in Ba Ria-Vung Tau Province where some 2000 PAVN/VC combatants (mainly 5th and 9th Division soldiers) are buried.

In 2010, as part of Operation Wandering Souls, Bob Hall and Derrill de Heer, both Vietnam veterans who are now academics at the University of New South Wales and the Australian Defence Force Academy, presented to the Veterans Association of Ba Ria-Vung Tau province, a list containing the full names, ranks and unit numbers of 535 Vietnamese soldiers buried by Australians in the province.
