= Official history =

Work of history which is sponsored or endorsed by its subject

An official history is a work of history which is sponsored, authorised or endorsed by its subject. The term is most commonly used for histories which are produced for a government. The term also applies to commissions from non-state bodies including histories of commercial companies. An official biography (one written with the permission, cooperation and sometimes the participation of its subject or heirs) is an authorised biography.

Official histories frequently have the advantage that the author has had access to archives, been allowed to interview subjects and use other primary sources closed to independent historians. Because of the close relationship between author and subject, such works may be (or be perceived to be) partisan in tone and to lack historical objectivity. Such bias varies and some official histories have been called exercises in propaganda; in other cases the authors have retained a measure of independence.

== Early ==
There is a tradition of history written or published under official patronage; Polydore Vergil wrote the Anglica Historia (drafted by 1513 and published in 1534), a history of England, at the request of King Henry VII (r. 1485–1509); William Camden's Annales Rerum Gestarum Angliae et Hiberniae Regnate Elizabetha (1615–1627), recounts the history of the reign of Elizabeth I of England (1558–1603). In early-modern Europe, royal courts appointed official historians, including the Kongelig historiograf (Historiographer Royal) in the kingdom of Denmark–Norway from 1594, the Rikshistoriograf in Sweden from 1618, the Historiographer Royal in England from 1660 and the Historiographer Royal in Scotland from 1681.

Each book in the Twenty-Four Histories records the official history of a Chinese dynasty. Sixteen of the histories were written between the 7th and 15th centuries. The first is Records of the Grand Historian, authored by Sima Qian (c. 145 – c. 86 BCE) in the Han dynasty and the last is History of Ming (completed in the 1730s). From the Tang dynasty (618–907) a government office for historiography compiled official histories. They were revised and expanded by the compilers during the dynasty and the succeeding dynasty published a final edition.

== Modern ==
The modern form of official history began in the mid-nineteenth century in reports written as military guides for later officers. The histories were detailed descriptions of events, not easy reading for a lay audience and left judgements to the discretion of a mainly professional readership. After the First World War, the New Zealand government decided that after a total war, its official histories should be written for a public who had fought the war or supported the war effort. After the Second World War, the low academic standard of military education, especially in historical analysis, led to a view that professionally trained historians should write official histories, applying their academic training to explain why as well as describe what. Since many of the academics had participated in the war, they could be expected to have experience of military service and knowledge of the war to inform their writing. A contemporary view is that official history should incorporate the three points of view, containing the detailed description needed for works of military instruction but also to be suitable for a general readership and to show how participants tried to solve problems, drawing lessons from their successes and failures. None of the points of view to be served by the production of official history is immune to error, because work by a military historian might be fraudulent for personal or political reasons, distorting the record. Populist history can dilute the story to the point of worthlessness and civilian academics can be prone to select facts and interpretations according to ideals, ideology and preconceived ideas.

Military histories written as textbooks might be thought to have a basis in truth, necessary to teach useful lessons to students. The British Report of the Committee on the Lessons of the Great War (Kirk Report, 1931) drew on the published volumes of the British official history and the conclusions were incorporated into a new edition of Field Service Regulations. That operations might be conducted in Iraq and Iran, led to official history volumes being produced against the objections of the Foreign Office. Military histories concentrated on the doings of national contingents, with only rare references to those of allied and opposing armies, since they had their own histories. Comparative analysis can be absent and national bias from ulterior motives, like mythologising and apologetics can also be found. The Australian Official History of Australia in the War of 1914–1918 edited by Charles Bean contains exaggerations of the significance of the Australian contribution, the prowess of Australian soldiers and disparagement of soldiers from Britain and its allies. Australian failures and casualties are sometimes blamed on British higher commanders, when high-ranking Australian officers could justly be criticised. The post-war Royal Air Force (RAF) was at risk of abolition and to justify its existence needed a function that could not be replicated by the army or navy. The parts of The War in the Air (six text volumes and an appendix volume, 1922–1937) written by Walter Raleigh and Henry Jones, gave undue emphasis to strategic bombing, which unbalanced the work.

Embarrassing events can be disguised by underwriting as happened in Histoire de La Grande Guerre, where the French Army Mutinies of 1917 occurred in 43 per cent of the French Army, yet were passed over in a few paragraphs. Many of the historians, editors and contributors to the History of the Great War (1915–1949) had been senior officers during the war, that had the advantage first-hand knowledge of events and experience of military art for the work but this risked allowing a desire to protect reputations to intrude, leading to unfair blame, particularly on outsiders. Volume III of the Royal Navy history Naval Operations (1923) had the narrative of the Battle of Jutland (1916) and the draft text was revised at the request of some serving officers present at the battle, to remove critical remarks about them. When a revised edition was published in 1940, many of the officers were retired or dead but the excised passages were not restored. The British Army Military Operations.... volumes have been criticised for dishonesty in not blaming General Headquarters (GHQ) for the extent of British casualties and for exculpating Sir Douglas Haig (commander of the British Expeditionary Force (BEF) from December 1915 to the Armistice). That the history is a description of events, rather than an analytical work with criticism and conclusions, means that Haig and other commanders may escape blame, yet it leaves the reader free to form conclusions.

=== Military ===
==== Austria-Hungary ====
- Österreich-Ungarns Letzter Krieg, 1914–1918 (Austria-Hungary's Last War, 1914–1918)

==== Australia ====
- Official History of Australia in the War of 1914–1918
- Australia in the War of 1939–1945
- Australia in the Korean War 1950–53
- The Official History of Australia's Involvement in Southeast Asian Conflicts 1948–1975
- Official History of Australian Peacekeeping, Humanitarian and Post-Cold War Operations
- Official History of Australian Operations in Iraq and Afghanistan, and Australian Peacekeeping Operations in East Timor

==== Belgium ====
- La Belgique et la Guerre (Belgium and the War)

==== Britain ====
- British Official History of the Nile Expedition
- Official History of the War in South Africa 1899–1902
- History of the Great War
- History of the Second World War
- The Official History of the Falklands Campaign

==== Canada ====
- Official History of the Canadian Army in the First World War
- Official History of the Canadian Army in the Second World War
- Official History of the Canadian Army in the Korean War

==== France ====
- Les armées françaises dans la Grande guerre (The French armies in the Great War)

==== Germany ====
- Der Weltkrieg 1914 bis 1918: Militärischen Operationen zu Lande (The World War 1914–1918: Military Operations on Land)
- Der Krieg zur See 1914–1918 (The War at Sea 1914–1918)
- Die Bayern im Großen Kriege 1914–1918 (Bavaria in the Great War 1914–1918)
- Das Deutsche Reich und der Zweite Weltkrieg (Germany and the Second World War)

==== Italy ====
- Maggiore Esercito: Ufficio Storico L'esercito Italiano nella Grande Guerra 1915–1918 (General Army Historical Office: The Italian Army in the Great War 1915–1918)
- Ufficio Storico della Regia Marina La Marina Italiano nella Grande Guerra (Royal Navy Historical Office: The Italian Navy in the Great War 1915–1918)

==== India ====
- Official History of the Indian Armed Forces In the Second World War (1939–1945)
- Official History of the 1971 India Pakistan War

==== Netherlands ====
- The Kingdom of the Netherlands During World War II

==== New Zealand ====
- Official History of New Zealand's Effort in the Great War
- Official History of New Zealand in the Second World War 1939–45

==== United States ====
- The Official Record of the United States' Part in the Great War
- The Army Air Forces in World War II
- History of United States Naval Operations in World War II
- United States Army in World War II

==== South Africa ====
- The Union of South Africa and the Great War 1914–1918: Official History
- South African Forces, World War II
