= Garth Pratten =

Australian historian

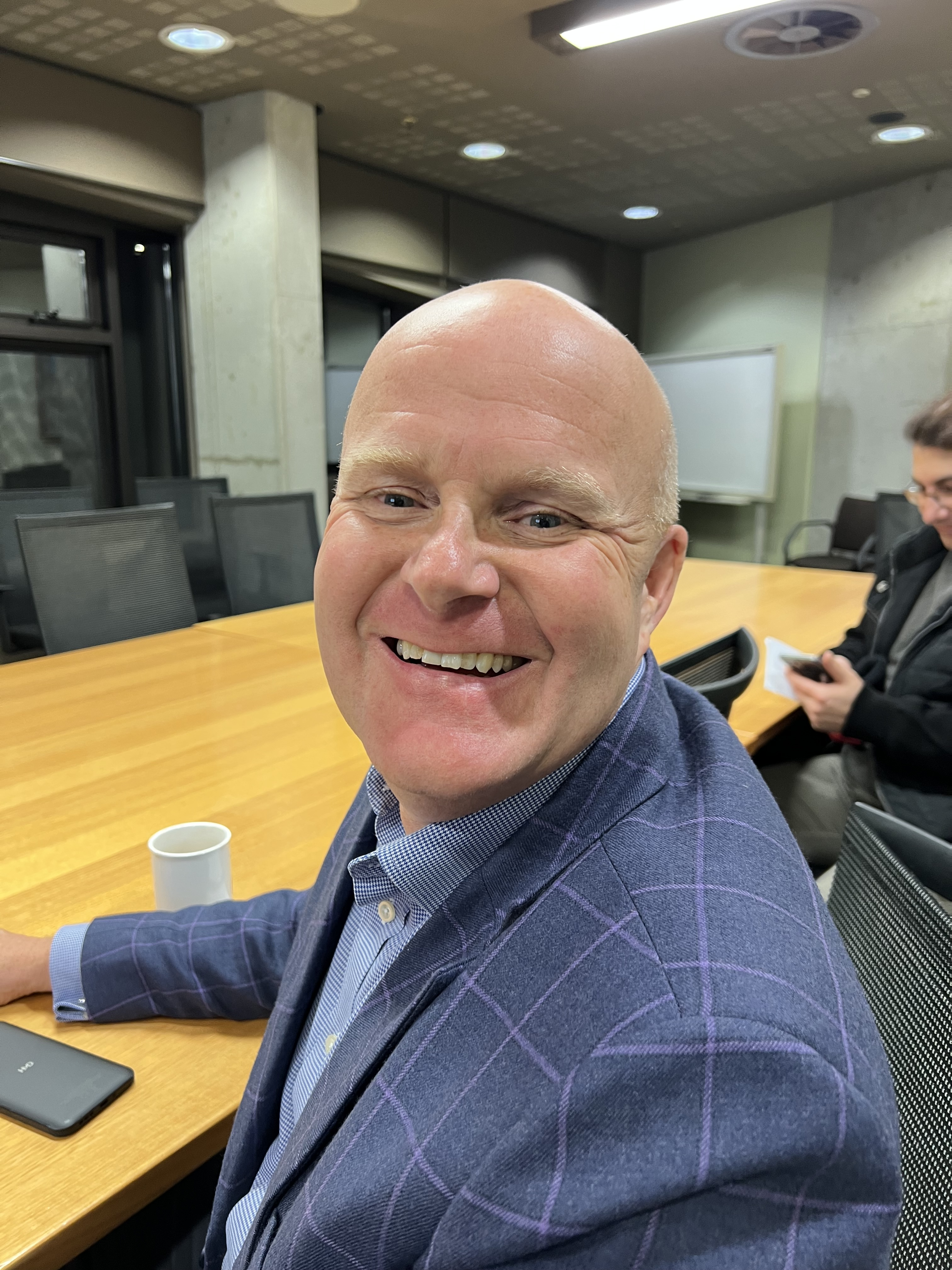
- Born: 1973 (age 52–53)
- Awards: CEW Bean Prize for Military History (2006)

Academic background
- Education: University of Melbourne (BA [Hons]); Deakin University (PhD)
- Thesis: "Old Man": Australian Battalion Commanders in the Second World War (2006)

Academic work
- Institutions: Australian National University; Royal Military Academy Sandhurst; Australian War Memorial
- Main interests: Military history Operational art

Garth Pratten (born 1973) is an Australian historian in the Strategic and Defence Studies Centre at the Australian National University.

Pratten has worked for the Australian Army's Training Command, as a historian at the Australian War Memorial, and taught at Deakin University, in the War Studies Department at the Royal Military Academy Sandhurst and at the Australian National University. In 2010, Pratten deployed to Afghanistan as part of the team compiling the war diary for ISAF's Regional Command South while working for the British Ministry of Defence. Pratten undertook field work in France, Belgium, Libya, Malaya, Singapore, Turkey and Cyprus.

== Bibliography ==
Pratten's publications include:

- Pratten, G. M. (2016). "'Calling the tune': Australian and Allied Operations at Balikpapan". In Dean, P. J. (ed.). Australia 1944–45: Victory in the Pacific. Port Melbourne: Cambridge University Press. ISBN 9781107083462.
- Pratten, G. M. (2016). "'Unique in the history of the AIF': Operations in British Borneo". In Dean, P. J. (ed.). Australia 1944–45: Victory in the Pacific. Port Melbourne: Cambridge University Press. ISBN 9781107083462.
- Pratten, G. M. (2015). "New Model Diggers: Australian Identity, Motivation, and Cohesion in Afghanistan". In King, Anthony (ed.). Frontline: Combat and Cohesion in the Twenty-First Century. Oxford: Oxford University Press. ISBN 9780198719663.
- Pratten, G. M. (2013). "Applying the Principles of War: Securing the Huon Peninsula". In Dean, P. J. (ed.). Australia 1943: The Liberation of New Guinea. Port Melbourne: Cambridge University Press. ISBN 9781107445239.
- Pratten, G. M.; Farrell, B. P. (2009). Malaya. Canberra: Army History Unit. ISBN 9780980567441.
- Pratten, G. M. (2009). Australian Battalion Commanders in the Second World War. Melbourne: Cambridge University Press. ISBN 9780521763455.
- Pratten, G. M.; Harper, G. J., eds. (1997). Still the Same: Reflections on Active Service from Bardia to Baidoa. Georges Heights: Army Doctrine Centre. ISBN 9780642244352.
