= Jeffrey Grey =

Australian military historian

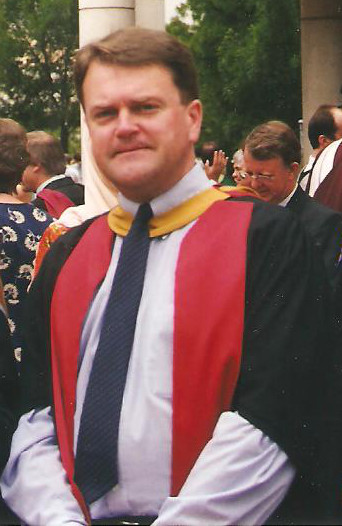
- Jeffrey Grey at ADFA graduation ceremonies in 1999
- Born: Jeffrey Guy Grey; 19 March 1959
- Died: 26 July 2016 (aged 57); Queanbeyan, New South Wales

Academic background
- Education: Australian National University; University of New South Wales
- Thesis: British Commonwealth Forces in the Korean War: A study of a military alliance relationship (1985)
- Doctoral advisor: Peter Dennis

Academic work
- Discipline: Military History
- Institutions: University of New South Wales; Marine Corps University

Jeffrey Guy Grey (19 March 1959 – 26 July 2016) was an Australian military historian. He wrote two volumes of The Official History of Australia's Involvement in Southeast Asian Conflicts 1948–1975, and several other high-profile works on Australia's military history. He was the first non-American to become the president of the Society for Military History, but is perhaps best known as the author of A Military History of Australia (first edition 1990).

== Early life and education ==
Jeffrey Guy Grey was born on 19 March 1959, the son of Ron Grey, an Australian Army officer and his wife Patricia. He had two sisters, Penny and Gina. His family was a military one; his father eventually reached the rank of major general, and two of his uncles became brigadiers. Raised as an Army brat, he moved about frequently; but lived most of his early life in Canberra, where he settled. He entered the Australian National University, from which he graduated in 1983, and joined the Faculty of Military Studies at the Royal Military College, Duntroon, as a teaching fellow. He completed his doctorate there under the supervision of Peter Dennis, writing his 1985 thesis on "British Commonwealth forces in the Korean War: a study of a military alliance relationship".

== Career ==
Grey joined the Historical Section of the Department of Foreign Affairs, but returned to the University of New South Wales at the new Australian Defence Force Academy (ADFA) campus in 1988, and became a professor there in 2003. Over the years he taught thousands of cadets and midshipmen, and supervised numerous postgraduate students. He wrote prolifically about the Korean War and the Vietnam War. With Peter Dennis he wrote about the Indonesian Confrontation in Emergency and Confrontation (1996), a volume of The Official History of Australia's Involvement in Southeast Asian Conflicts 1948–1975, and was the sole author of another volume in the series, Up Top (1998), which detailed the role of the Royal Australian Navy in the Malayan Emergency, the Indonesian Confrontation and the Vietnam War. He was perhaps best known as the author of A Military History of Australia (first edition 1990), a widely used single-volume textbook.

With his colleagues at ADFA, he produced the Oxford Companion to Australian Military History. He wrote the volume on the Australian Army for the Oxford Australian Centenary History of Defence, and the volume on The War with the Ottoman Empire (2015) for The Centenary History of Australia and the Great War, a project for which he was a driving force. In cooperation with Peter Dennis and Roger Lee from the Army History Unit, he ran the annual Army History Conference, for which he managed to secure distinguished historians from around the world as speakers. For an Australian military historian, he was unusually well known outside Australia. He held the Major General Matthew C. Horner Chair of Military Theory at the United States Marine Corps University in Quantico, Virginia, from 2000 to 2002, and in 2015 he became the first non-American to become the president of the Society for Military History.

Grey died suddenly of a heart attack on 26 July 2016. A memorial service was held at the Anzac Memorial Chapel at Duntroon, conducted by Tom Frame, the former Anglican Bishop of the Australian Defence Force. He was survived by his father Ron; sisters Penny and Gina; his first wife, Gina, and their daughter Victoria and son Duncan; his second wife, Emma and their son Sebastian; and his step-daughters Hannah and Sophie. The October 2017 edition of The Journal of Military History was dedicated to Grey's memory, and featured several articles by or about him.

== Published works ==
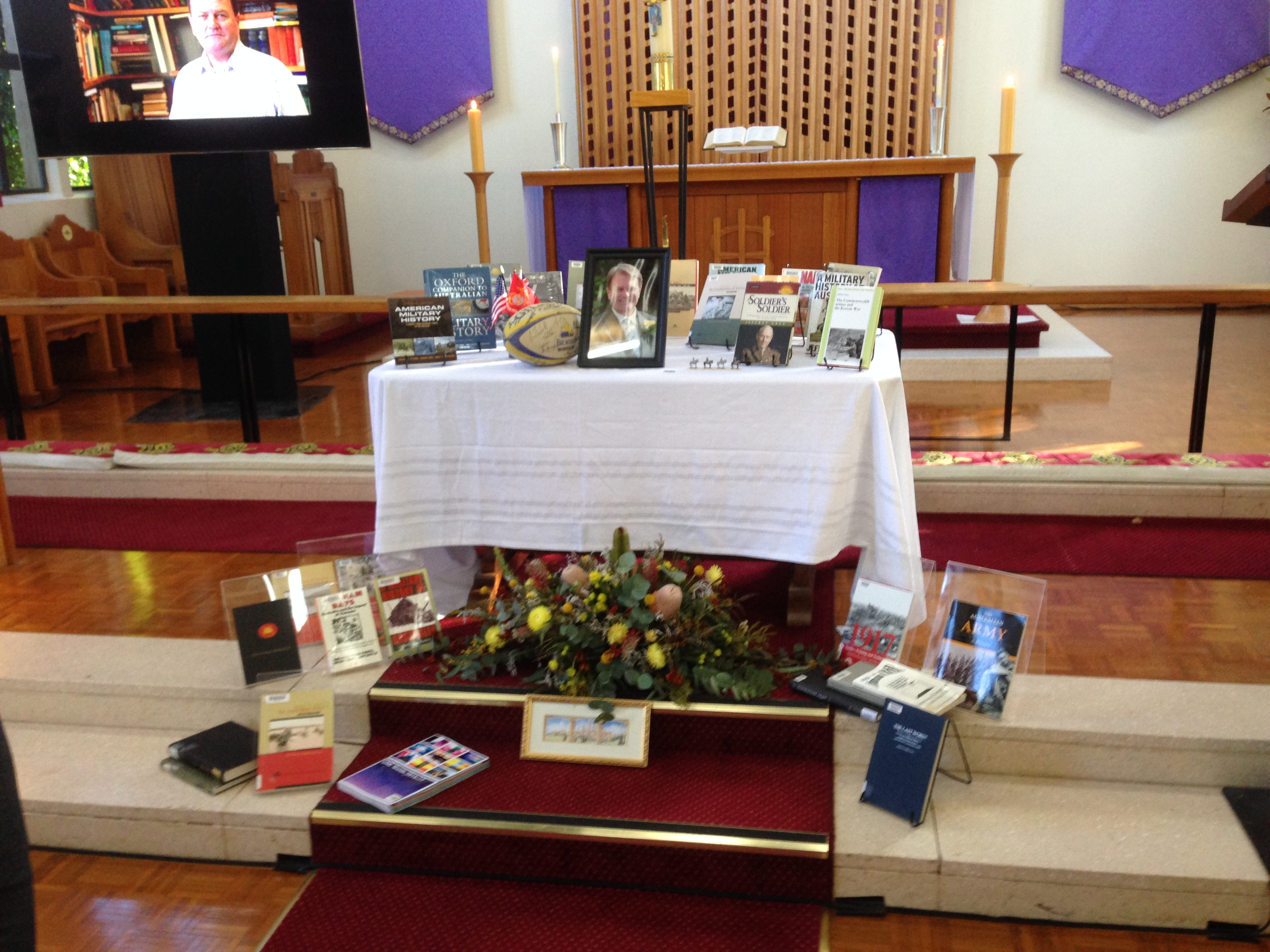
Memorial service for Jeffrey Grey at the Anzac Chapel at the Royal Military College, Duntroon. His image is surrounded by his books and an autographed rugby ball.

Author

- Grey, Jeffrey (1988). The Commonwealth Armies and the Korean War: An Alliance Study. Manchester: Manchester University Press. ISBN 0719026113.
- — (1990). A Military History of Australia. Melbourne: Cambridge University Press. ISBN 0521644836.
  - — (1999). A Military History of Australia (Revised ed.). Melbourne: Cambridge University Press. ISBN 0521644836.
  - — (2008). A Military History of Australia (3rd ed.). Port Melbourne: Cambridge University Press. ISBN 9780521875233.
- — (1992). Australian Brass: The Career of Lieutenant General Sir Horace Robertson. Cambridge: Cambridge University Press. ISBN 0521401577.
- Dennis, Peter; — (1996). Emergency and Confrontation: Australian Military Operations in Malaya & Borneo 1950–66. The Official History of Australia's Involvement in Southeast Asian Conflicts 1948–1975. Vol. 5. St Leonards: Allen & Unwin in association with the Australian War Memorial. ISBN 1863733027.
- — (1998). Up Top: The Royal Australian Navy and Southeast Asian Conflicts, 1955–1972. The Official History of Australia's Involvement in Southeast Asian Conflicts 1948–1975. Vol. 7. St Leonards: Allen & Unwin in association with the Australian War Memorial. ISBN 1864482907.
- — (2006). The Australian Army: A History. The Australian Centenary History of Defence. Melbourne: Oxford University Press. ISBN 0195541146.
- — (2012). A Soldier's Soldier: A Biography of Lieutenant General Sir Thomas Daly. Port Melbourne: Cambridge University Press. ISBN 9781107031272.
- — (2015). The War with the Ottoman Empire. The Centenary History of Australia and the Great War. Vol. 2. South Melbourne: Oxford University Press. ISBN 9780195576764.

Editor

- Pierce, Peter; Doyle, Jeff; Grey, Jeffrey, eds. (1991). Vietnam days : Australia and the impact of Vietnam.
- Grey, Jeffrey; Doyle, Jeff, eds. (1991). Australia R & R : representations and reinterpretations of Australia's war in Vietnam.
- Grey, Jeffrey; Doyle, Jeff, eds. (1992). Vietnam : war, myth, and memory : comparative perspectives on Australia's war in Vietnam.
- Prior, Robin; Grey, Jeffrey, eds. (1993). The Pacific War 1942.
- Grey, Jeffrey, ed. (1993). The transformation in air power in the aftermath of the Korean war.
- Dennis, Peter; Grey, Jeffrey, eds. (1995). From past to future : the Australian experience of land/air operations : proceedings of the Australian Army History Conference held at the Australian Defence Force Academy, 29 September 1995.
- Dennis, Peter; Grey, Jeffrey, eds. (1996). Serving vital interests : Australia's strategic planning in peace and war : proceedings of the Australian Army History Conference held at the Australian War Memorial, 30 September 1996.
- Dennis, Peter; Grey, Jeffrey, eds. (1997). The second fifty years : the Australian Army 1947–1997 : proceedings of the Chief of Army's History Conference held at the Australian Defence Force Academy, 23 September 1997.
- Grey, Jeffrey, ed. (1998). A commonwealth of histories : the official histories of the Second World War in the United States, Britain and the Commonwealth / Jeffrey Grey.
- Dennis, Peter; Grey, Jeffrey, eds. (1998). 1918 defining victory : proceedings of the Chief of Army's History Conference held at the National Convention Centre, Canberra, 29 September 1998 / edited by Peter Dennis & Jeffrey Grey.
- Dennis, Peter; Grey, Jeffrey, eds. (1999). The Boer War : army, nation and empire.
- Dennis, Peter; Grey, Jeffrey, eds. (2002). The Australian Army and the Vietnam War 1962–1972 : the 2000 Chief of Army's Military History Conference.
- Grey, Jeffrey, ed. (2003). The last word? : essays on official history in the United States and British Commonwealth / edited by Jeffrey Grey.
- Dennis, Peter; Grey, Jeffrey, eds. (2000). The Korean war 1950–53 : a fifty year retrospective : the Chief of Army's Military History Conference, 2000.
- Dennis, Peter; Grey, Jeffrey, eds. (2001). A century of service : 100 years of the Australian Army : the 2001 Chief of Army's Military History Conference.
- Dennis, Peter; Grey, Jeffrey, eds. (2003). The foundations of victory : the Pacific War 1943–1944 : the 2003 Chief of Army's Military History Conference.
- Dennis, Peter; Grey, Jeffrey, eds. (2004). Battles near and far : a century of operational deployment : the 2004 Chief of Army Military History Conference.
- Dennis, Peter; Grey, Jeffrey, eds. (2005). Entangling alliances : coalition warfare in the twentieth century : the 2005 Chief of Army Military History Conference.
- Dennis, Peter; Grey, Jeffrey, eds. (2006). An art in itself : the theory and conduct of small wars and insurgencies : the 2006 Chief of Army Military History Conference.
- Dennis, Peter; Grey, Jeffrey, eds. (2007). 1917 : tactics, training and technology : the 2007 Chief of Army Military History Conference.
- Dennis, Peter; Grey, Jeffrey, eds. (2008). The military and the media : the 2008 Chief of Army Military History Conference.
- Dennis, Peter; Grey, Jeffrey, eds. (2009). Raise, train and sustain : delivering land combat power : the 2009 Chief of Army Military History Conference.
- Dennis, Peter; Grey, Jeffrey, eds. (2010). Victory or defeat : armies in the aftermath of conflict : the 2010 Chief of Army History Conference.
- Dennis, Peter; Grey, Jeffrey, eds. (2011). 1911 : preliminary moves : the 2011 Chief of Army History Conference.
- Grey, Jeffrey, ed. (2012). Chief of Army's reading list.
