= 3rd/4th Cavalry Regiment (Australia) =

Regiment of the Australian Army

- Cap badge of 3rd/4th Cavalry Regiment
- Active: 1981–2014; 2017–Present
- Country: Australia
- Branch: Army
- Type: Training support
- Role: Personnel, platform & logistic support
- Size: One squadron
- Part of: School of Armour
- Garrison/HQ: Puckapunyal
- Nickname(s): Stingers
- Motto(s): Resolute/Tenacious
- March: Old Comrades/Light Cavalry
- Engagements: Vietnam War; Somalia; Rwanda; East Timor; Iraq War; War in Afghanistan
- Decorations: Unit Citation for Gallantry (3CAV, ASQN)

Commanders
- Colonel-in-Chief: King Charles III (Colonel-in-Chief, RAAC)

Insignia
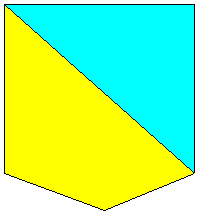
- Unit colour patch

The 3rd/4th Cavalry Regiment is an armoured unit within the Australian Army's Royal Australian Armoured Corps. Formed in 1981 with the amalgamation of the 3rd Cavalry Regiment and the 4th Cavalry Regiment, from 1986 to 2014 the unit consisted of an independent squadron, B Squadron 3rd/4th Cavalry Regiment, within the 3rd Brigade in Townsville, Queensland. From 2017, B Squadron 3rd/4th Cavalry Regiment has been the training support and logistics squadron within the School of Armour at Puckapunyal in Victoria.

== History ==
=== 3rd Cavalry Regiment ===
The 3rd Cavalry Regiment was formed in beginning of 1967 when, as a result of a re-organisation of the units of the Royal Australian Armoured Corps, the 1st Armoured Personnel Carrier Squadron which was serving in Vietnam at the time, was renamed as 'A' Squadron, 3rd Cavalry Regiment. At the same time 'B' Squadron, 3rd Cavalry Regiment was formed in Australia to provide a follow-on force and relieve 'A' Squadron at the end of their tour. Equipped with the M113A1 armoured personnel carriers (APCs), its initial strength in Vietnam was 10 officers and 107 men. Both 'A' and 'B' Squadrons of the 3rd Cavalry Regiment would continue this extensive service throughout the remainder of Australia's involvement in Vietnam as part of the 1st Australian Task Force (1 ATF), with a squadron of the regiment operating there for nearly the next six years.

The rotation of these two squadrons would continue until the withdrawal of Australian forces in 1972. Prior to this, however, when 'A' Squadron was relieved by 'B' Squadron on 13 May 1969, most of its personnel were transferred to 2nd Cavalry Regiment while 'B' Squadron, 3rd Cavalry Regiment finished their tour in country on 6 January 1971 when they were relieved by 'A' Squadron and returned to Australia. 'B' Squadron was subsequently relocated in Townsville. They remained at Townsville until they were amalgamated with the 4th Cavalry Regiment in 1981. Meanwhile, the regiment's strength in Vietnam increased over time and by August 1971 had grown to 15 officers and 154 men.

In mid-1971 'A' Squadron received six M113A1 Fire Support Vehicles (FSV), each armed with 76 mm gun mounted in a Saladin turret. The FSV was more heavily armed than the M113A1 carrier but was still only lightly protected, being designed for defensive tasks to free the Centurion tanks for offensive operations. However, in August the Australian government announced that 1 ATF would be withdrawn from Vietnam, beginning a drawdown of forces. In October the remaining troops moved to Vung Tau; however, a company from the 4th Battalion, Royal Australian Regiment/NZ (ANZAC) with a troop of APCs and support personnel remained at Nui Dat. In December the bulk of 'A' Squadron returned to Australia, while No. 1 Troop later moved to Vung Tau before returning to Australia in March 1972.

Between 1967 and 1972 elements of the regiment served in every major operation carried out by 1 ATF, including the Tet Offensive and Battle of Coral–Balmoral in 1968, and the Battle of Binh Ba in 1969. Casualties sustained by the regiment in Vietnam numbered 20 killed and 115 wounded.

=== 4th Cavalry Regiment ===
The 4th Cavalry Regiment was raised in late 1971, as part of the Australian Army's plan to establish three regular cavalry units. The regiment came into being at Enoggera Barracks by redesignating 'B' Squadron, 2nd Cavalry Regiment, which had previously been based at Wacol, Queensland, and subsequently became 'A' Squadron in the new regiment. In early 1975, a regimental headquarters and a second squadron, known as 'B' Squadron, were raised to complete its establishment.

=== Amalgamation ===
In 1981, the decision was made to amalgamate the two regiments to form the 3rd/4th Cavalry Regiment. After this, the unit headquarters was established at Enoggera Barracks in Brisbane along with 'A' Squadron and the Technical Squadron, although 'B' Squadron, which had been transferred from the 3rd Cavalry Regiment, remained in Townsville. On 14 May 1986, while at Enoggera, His Royal Highness Prince Philip, the Duke of Edinburgh, presented the 3rd Cavalry Regiment's guidon to the 3rd/4th Cavalry Regiment. In July the same year, the decision was made to reduce the regiment to a single squadron and, as a result, the Brisbane-based elements were transferred to the 2nd/14th Light Horse Regiment, leaving 'B' Squadron in Townsville.

Throughout the early 1990s, the squadron deployed on several peacekeeping operations to Africa. In 1992–93, the squadron was committed to Operation Solace in Somalia where they supported the 1st Battalion, Royal Australian Regiment deploying almost 100 personnel and 36 M113 armoured personnel carriers to the Baidoa region. Later, in 1994–95, they deployed on Operation Tamar in support of the United Nations Assistance Mission for Rwanda where they provided a section of three M113s and a support vehicle to operate with Australian medical teams.

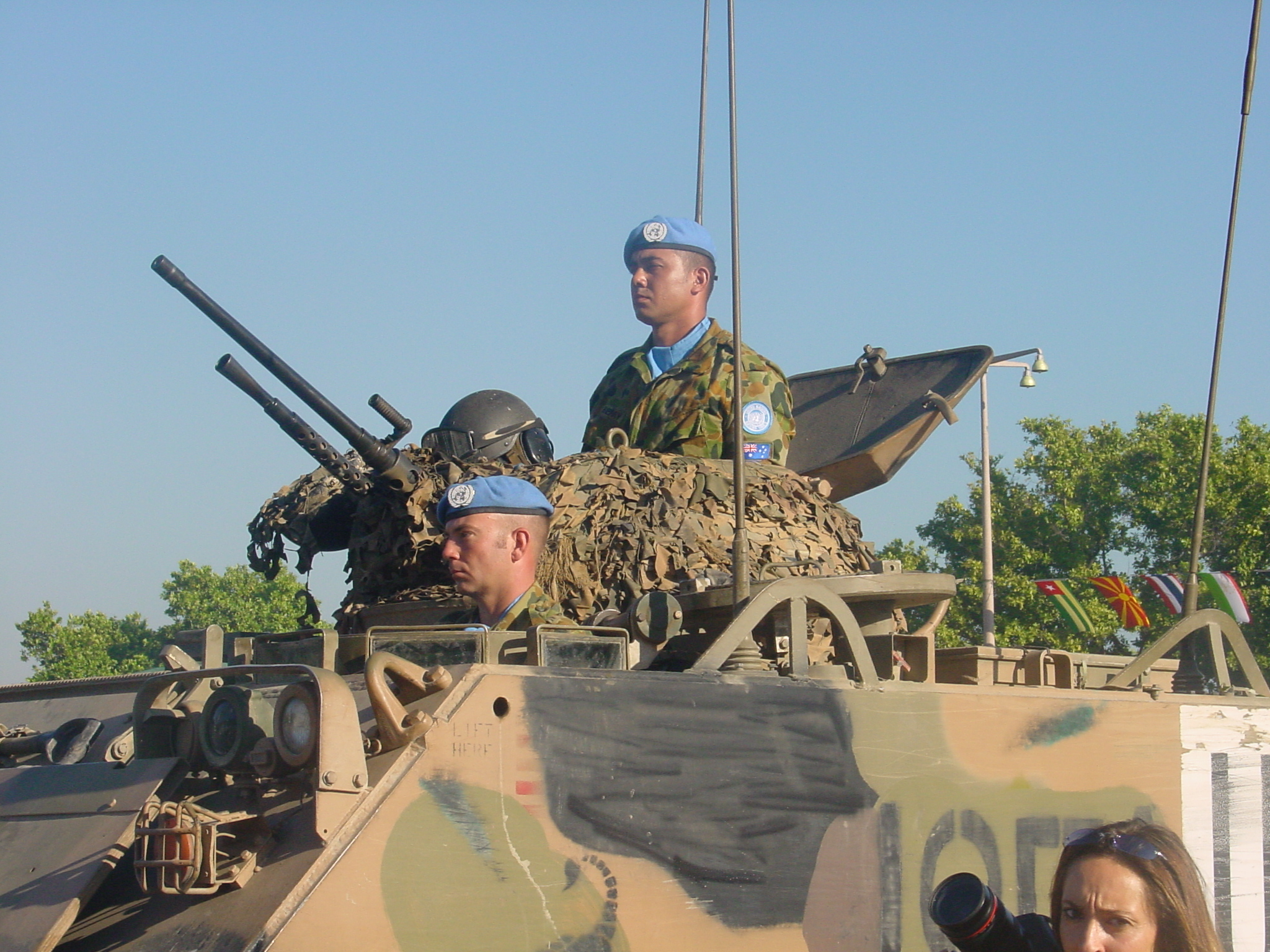
M113 APC of 3/4 CAV on peacekeeping duties in East Timor

Since the late 1990s, the squadron has supported operations in Iraq, Afghanistan and Timor Leste, operating M113s in Timor as part of various commitments including INTERFET, UNTAET and later Operation Astute. In Iraq, the squadron provided personnel to crew ASLAVs assigned to SECDET, the Al Muthanna Task Group and Overwatch Battle Group (West), while the squadron deployed its Bushmaster infantry mobility vehicles to Afghanistan as part of Operation Slipper.

=== Abeyance and reforming ===
On 27 November 2014, B Squadron 3rd/4th Cavalry Regiment held a transition parade with the 2nd Cavalry Regiment where the squadron's personnel, materiel and facilities were transferred to the latter and the unit ceased to operate. At this time custodianship of the unit's guidons and historical collection were transferred to the RAAC Head of Corps cell within the School of Armour.

On 8 July 2017 a parade was held at the School of Armour in which the School of Armour's Support Squadron was renamed B Squadron, 3rd/4th Cavalry Regiment. The Squadron retains the customs and traditions of the 3rd/4th Cavalry Regiment but is no longer an independent sub-unit, being completely under command of the School of Armour.

The historical collections of the 1st Armoured Personnel Carrier Squadron, the 3rd Cavalry Regiment, the 4th Cavalry Regiment and the 3rd/4th Cavalry Regiment are all held at the School of Armour.

== Battle honours ==
- Vietnam War: Long Tan, Bien Hoa, Coral–Balmoral, Hat Dich, Binh Ba, Vietnam 1965–72.

== See also ==
- Military history of Australia during the Vietnam War
