= Thai Humanitarian Assistance Task Force 976 Thai-Iraq =

Special operations force of the Royal Thai Army

- กองกำลังเฉพาะกิจ 976 ไทย-อิรัก
- Active: 30 September 2003 – 30 September 2004
- Country: Thailand
- Branch: Royal Thai Armed Forces
- Type: Non-combatant
- Role: Artillery observer Bomb disposal CBRN defense Close-quarters combat Desert warfare Emergency medicine Force protection Humanitarian aid Humanitarian intervention HUMINT; Medical assistant Medical evacuation Military engineering Military logistics Patrolling; Peacekeeping; Raiding; Reconnaissance; Screening; Security checkpoint Tactical emergency medical services Urban warfare
- Size: 866
- Part of: Multi-National Force – Iraq
- Garrison/HQ: Camp Lima, Karbala, Iraq
- Nicknames: กกล.ฉก.976 ไทย-อิรัก (Task Force 976 Thai-Iraq)
- Engagements: Iraq War; 2003 Karbala bombings; Iraq spring fighting of 2004; Iraqi insurgency (2003–2006)

The Task Force 976 Thai-Iraq (Thai: กองกำลังเฉพาะกิจ 976 ไทย-อิรัก) (กกล.ฉก ๙๗๖) was a military unit of the Royal Thai Armed Forces, it was a part of the Multi-National Force – Iraq The Mission unit was Humanitarian Operation in Iraq, After the successful US invasion of Iraq, Thailand contributed 423 non-combat troops (it's a combined forces between a few combat unit, combat service support unit, and combat support unit) in August 2003 to nation building and medical assistance in post-Saddam Iraq.

Troops of the Royal Thai Army were attacked in the 2003 Karbala bombings, which killed two soldiers and wounded five others.

However, the Thai mission in Iraq was considered an overall success, and Thailand withdrew its forces in August 2004. The mission was considered the main reason the United States decided to designate Thailand as a major non-NATO ally in 2003.

== Force overview ==
Thailand's Task Force 976 Thai-Iraq Consisted of an engineer battalion, six medical teams, a force security platoon, and a support platoon. The Task Force served under Polish command in MND-CS.

== Operations ==
- The Thai Force deployed to Lima Camp in Karbala in September 2003 to provide engineering support, civil-military operations, and humanitarian assistance. It rebuilt local hospitals and clinics, renovated and reopened schools, and repaired other infrastructure facilities. The Thai engineers also assisted in constructing and repairing MND-CS installations around Karbala, while the medical service teams administered medical care to locals and provided physicians to support the polish medical company.
- On 27 December 2003, Suicide bombers struck Camp Lima, some 100 kilometers southwest of Baghdad, station (all in Karbala). The Camp Lima attacker rammed his vehicle into the post's wall, killing two Thai Security Troops and wounding five other Thai Soldiers. In all, 6 coalition troop were killed (The other 4 being Bulgarian) and 97 coalition troops were wounded. At least 8 civilians were killed and many more wounded. The attack was atypical, as a majority of the violence at the time was centered on the Sunni Triangle are a around Baghdad. Despite saying it would withdraw troops if attacked, The Thai government decided to keep the Task Force deployed until its original mandate expire on 30 September 2004.

== See also ==
- Multinational force in Iraq
- Occupation of Iraq (2003–2011)
- Al Muthanna Task Group
- Overwatch Battle Group (West)
- Dancon/Irak
- Zaytun Division
- Japanese Iraq Reconstruction and Support Group
