= Japanese Iraq Reconstruction and Support Group =

- 自衛隊イラク復興支援群
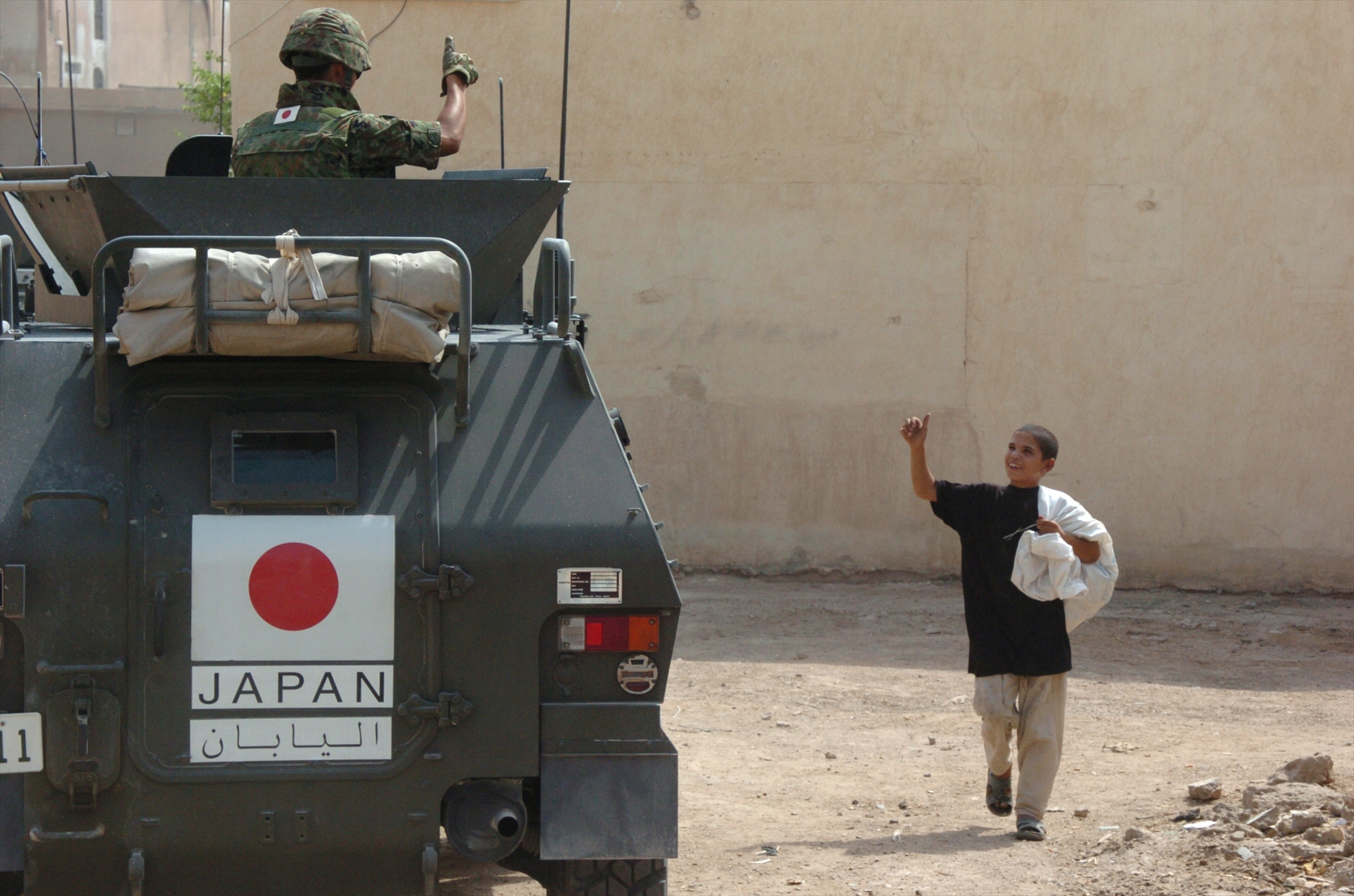
- Active: January 19, 2004 (Established); February 3, 2004 (Activated) – July 18, 2006 (Disbanded for JGSDF forces); 2004–2008 (Disbanded for JASDF forces)
- Country: Japan
- Type: Battalion
- Role: Humanitarian
- Size: 600
- Part of: Under command of the JGSDF
- Garrison/HQ: Samawah, Iraq

Commanders
- 1st Commander: Colonel Masahisa Sato(January 16, 2004 - February 27, 2004)
- 2nd Commander: Colonel Koichiro Bansho (February 27, 2004 – May 26, 2004)
- 3rd Commander: Colonel Yuki Imaura (May 8, 2004 – ?)
- 4th Commander: Colonel Masato Taura (June 25, 2004 - ?)

Insignia
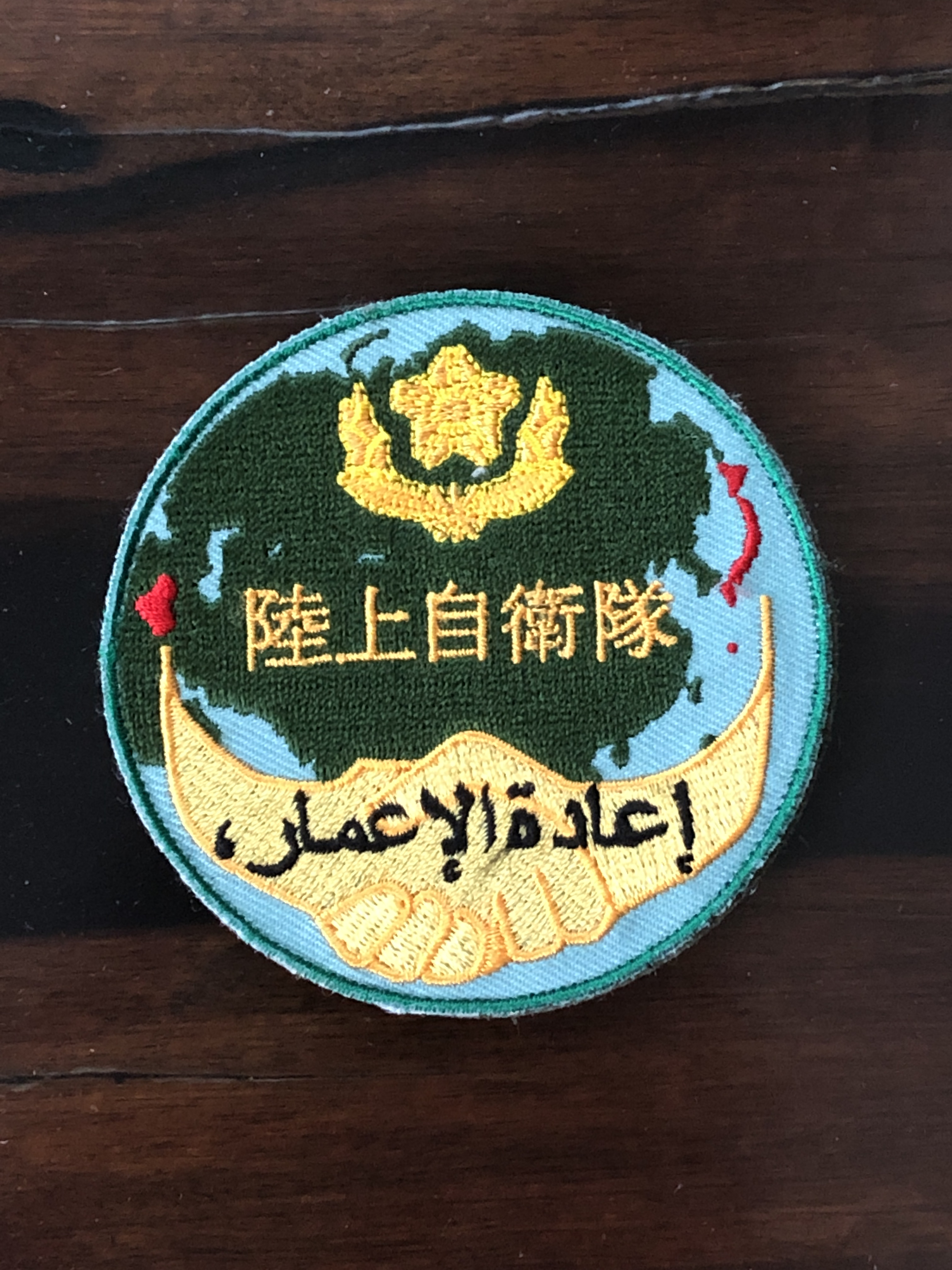
- Sleeve patch

The Japanese Iraq Reconstruction and Support Group, also known as the Japan Self-Defense Forces Iraq Reconstruction and Support Group (自衛隊イラク復興支援群; Jietai Iraku Fukkou Shiengun), was a battalion-sized, largely humanitarian contingent of the Japan Self-Defense Forces that was sent to Samawah, southern Iraq in early January 2004 and withdrawn by late July 2006. However, the last JASDF forces left Kuwait on December 18, 2008. Approximately 5,500 Japanese Ground Self-Defense Force members were present in Samawah between 2004 and 2006.

Their duties had included tasks such as water purification, reconstruction and reestablishment of public facilities, including medical facilities known as Public Health Centers, for the Iraqi people. Due to Japanese soldiers being prohibited from engaging enemy combatants, protection for the Group was provided primarily by the Australian Army with the approval of the Australian Government, who formed a battlegroup known as the Al Muthanna Task Group (AMTG), whose primary role was to provide a secure environment for the JIRSG. While legally required to remain within noncombat zones, GSDF records revealed that Japanese troops were present in areas of active hostilities.

== Background ==
The Koizumi administration originally ordered the controversial formation and deployment of the JIRSG at the request of the United States. This marks a significant turning point in Japan's history, as it represents the first foreign deployment of Japanese troops since the end of World War II, excluding those deployments conducted under United Nations auspices. Public opinion regarding the deployment was sharply divided, especially given that Article 9 of the Constitution of Japan prohibits the use of military forces unless for self-defence purposes (operating in Iraq seemed, at best, tenuously connected to that mission).

In order to legalize the deployment of Japanese forces in Samawah, the Koizumi administration legislated the Humanitarian Relief and Iraqi Reconstruction Special Measures Law on December 9, 2003, in the Diet, even though the opposition firmly opposed it.

Two Japanese diplomats were shot and killed near Tikrit, Iraq on November 29, 2003, while preparations for the deployment were in their final stages.

On April 8, 2004, three Japanese- a journalist and two aid workers- were kidnapped, but they were released several days later on April 15. The following day, another two Japanese- an aid worker and a journalist- were kidnapped and released within 24 hours. The kidnappers of the original three had threatened to burn the hostages alive if Japanese troops were not removed from Iraq within three days. A spokeswoman for the Islamic Clerics Committee, which negotiated their release, said that growing public calls in Japan for the SDF troops to be withdrawn from Iraq led to the release of three Japanese.

In a statement released on July 20, 2004, Al Zarqawi warned Japan, Poland and Bulgaria to withdraw their troops, demanding that the Japanese government: '...do what the Philippines has done...', and threatening that: 'Lines of cars laden with explosives are awaiting you...' if the demands were not met.

The body of a Japanese backpacker, Shosei Koda, was found in Baghdad on October 30, 2004, several days after he had been kidnapped. His captors had promised to execute him unless Japanese troops were withdrawn. According to Channel NewsAsia, the killing renewed domestic pressure on Prime Minister Koizumi to bring the contingent home.

One Japanese private security guard, Akihiko Saito, was killed in an ambush on his convoy on May 25, 2005.

== Significance ==
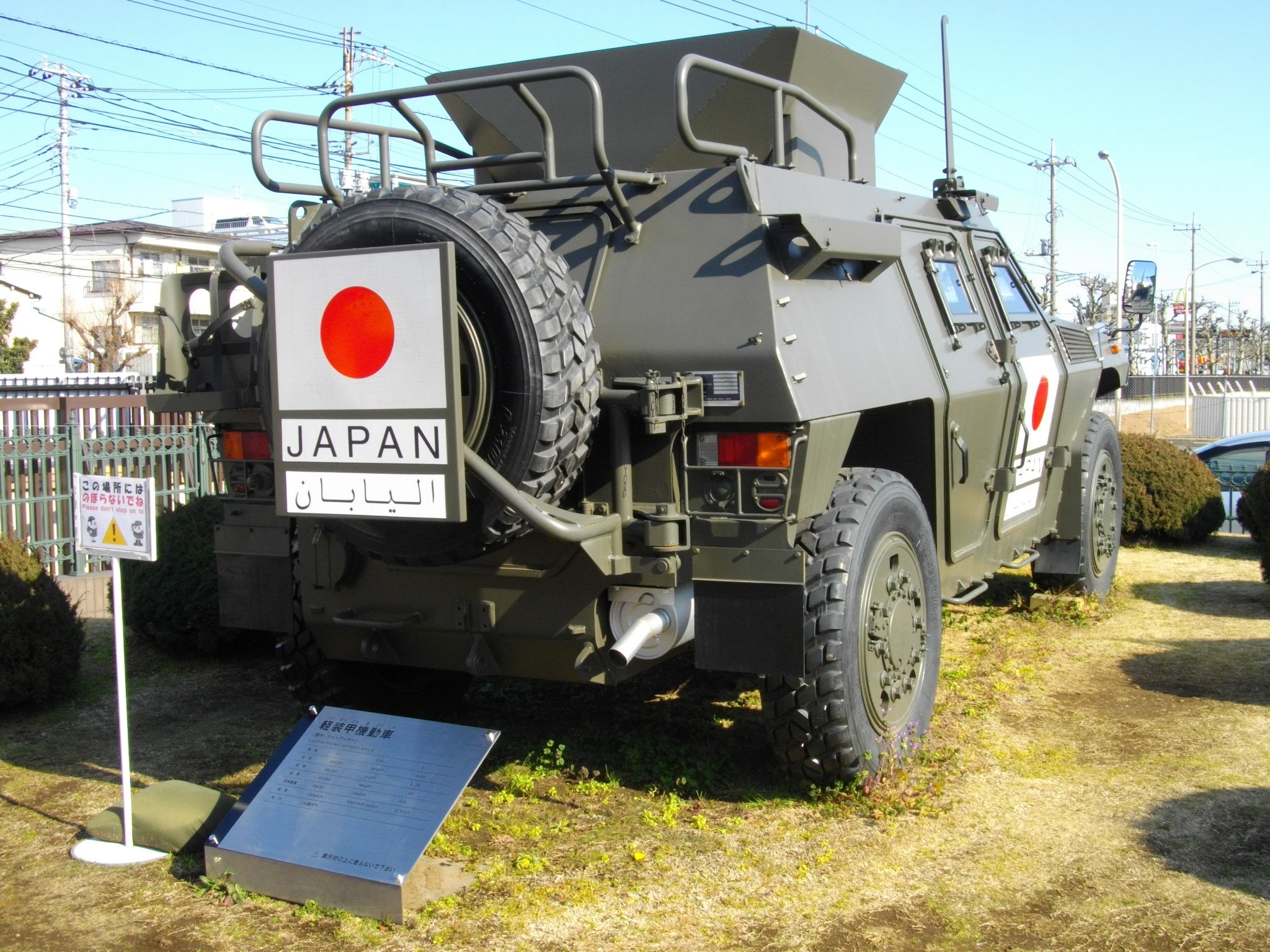
A Komatsu LAV on display with Japanese Iraq Reconstruction and Support Group markings during a public exhibition. Note the shield on top of the vehicle to protect standing JGSDF soldiers from gunfire at all sides.

Analysts differ as to the political ramifications of the deployment. One view is that it represents the emergence of Japan as a close military ally of the United States, strategically positioned as a counterweight to China's growing regional power. This position asserts that the Iraq deployment offers a constitutional model for future overseas deployment in circumvention of Article 9. Another interpretation is that the deployment is entirely symbolic as it comes at little financial or human cost to the Koizumi administration, has a negligible effect on the strategic situation in Iraq, and is simply aimed at maintaining positive relations with the U.S. so as to perpetuate a favorable economic relationship.

At the height of the deployment, on September 19, 2005, a senior Defense Agency official succinctly gave his opinion on the future prospects for overseas Japanese military deployments, drawing on his opinion of the Iraq mission: "It isn’t worth it". Analysts said that the restrictive rules of engagement and reliance on the constant protection of others effectively renders meaningful Japanese participation in international operations impossible for the foreseeable future.

One opposition member had said that the JIRSG deployment "wouldn't be a problem if it really were for humanitarian reasons. But it is first and foremost a show of support to the U.S. The U.S. invaded Iraq without a U.N. resolution, and Japan is now aiding in that act."

== Deployment ==
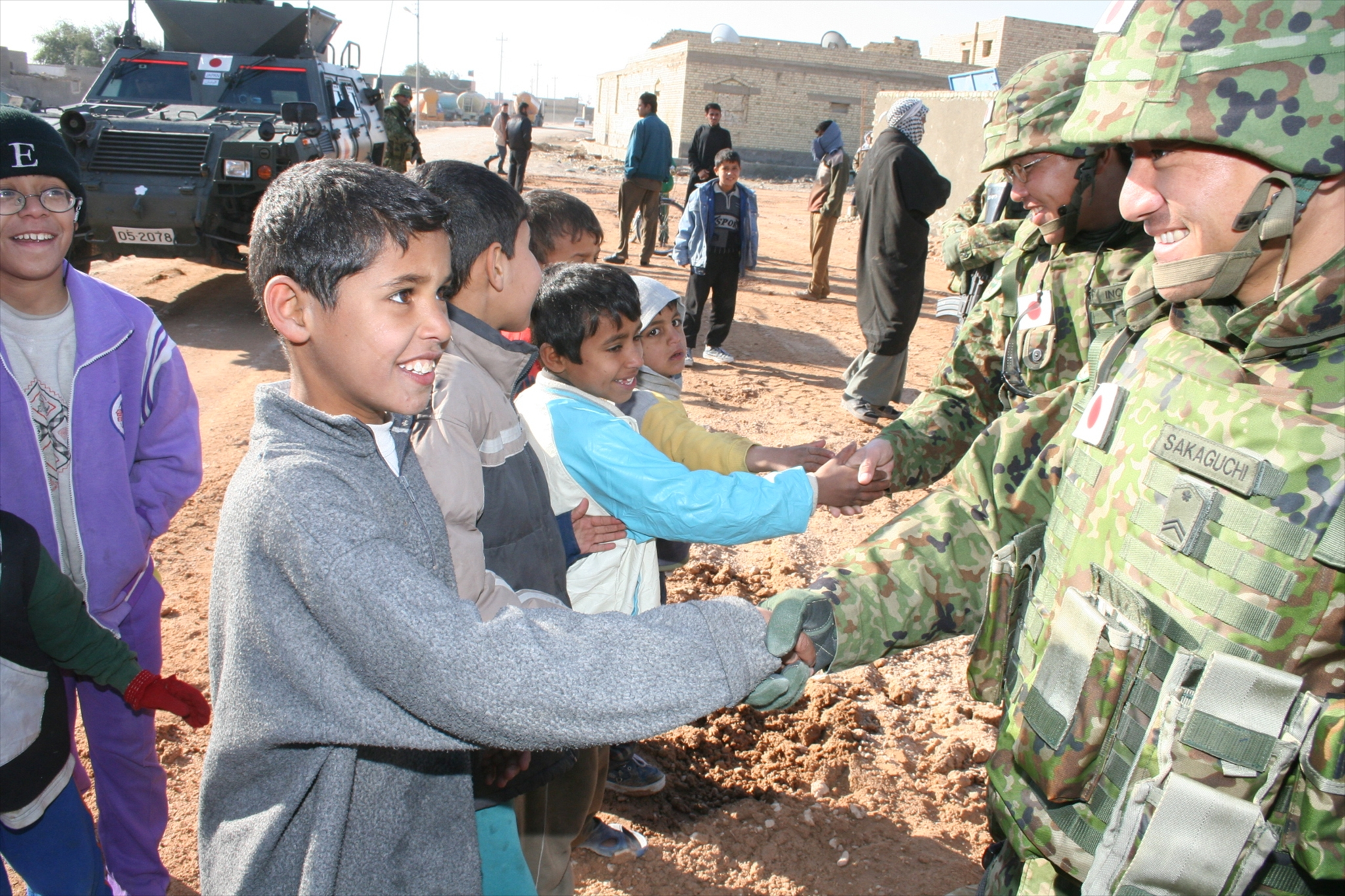
Iraqi children shake hands with JGSDF soldiers during a reconstruction operation.

Since the beginning of the war in Iraq, the city of Samawah has continuously been a relatively stable city, in what is probably the most peaceful and sparsely populated province of non-Kurdish Iraq.

The first elements of the contingent arrived in Kuwait on January 9 and January 17, 2004, after an advance team from the Japanese Air Self-Defense Forces (JASDF) assessed the security situation in Samawah in late December 2003 and to Kuwait for the arrival of other JSDF forces to Iraq. The first JGSDF troops arrived at the Dutch military base in Samawah on January 19.

Prime Minister Koizumi decided on December 8, 2005, to renew the contingent's mandate for another year, despite a poll by the Asahi newspaper which found that 69% of respondents were against renewing the mandate, up from 55% in January. A total of nine JIRSG scheduled rotations took place between 2004 and 2006.

Protection for the unit was provided primarily by Australian Army and Dutch troops, particularly the Australians as part of the Al Muthanna Task Group, which one of its roles was to provide a secure environment for the JIRSG. Due to Japanese soldiers being prohibited from engaging Iraqi guerrillas unless they came under fire. However, a small number of Japanese Special Forces Group, Western Army Infantry Regiment, and 1st Airborne Brigade soldiers were deployed to provide protection. Mortars and rockets were lobbed at the Japanese camp several times, causing no damage or injuries.

== Withdrawal ==
Although Defense Agency officials initially denied a report that the JSDF would be withdrawing from Iraq, they eventually confirmed that the contingent would leave Iraq by March 2006. Officials, however, subsequently insisted that any withdrawal would hinge on the ability of the Iraqis to form a new government by the end of 2006. A united Iraqi government was established in May 2006, and Koizumi subsequently announced that forces could be withdrawn as early as the end of July given the completion of the mission.

Koizumi announced on June 20, 2006, that the Japanese contingent would be withdrawn within 'several dozen days', however he suggested expanding airborne logistical support from southern parts of the country to Baghdad in place of the ground force.

On June 25, the first batch of the 600-member contingent began to withdraw from Samawah to Kuwait. The last 220 troops left Iraq by July 18. And the JIRSG base in Samawah was planned to be the new headquarters of the 2nd Brigade, 10th Division of the Iraqi Army.

Although all Japanese soldiers have left Iraq, JASDF forces continue to play a minor support role. As of November 2006, JASDF transport aircraft were assisting coalition forces by airlifting materials and personnel between Iraq and Kuwait. The airlift mission was extended until July 31, 2007, at which point it was extended again for another two years. As of November 26, 2008, 671.1 tons of supplies have been transported since March 2004.

Due to rising anti-Iraq war sentiment from the opposition, the Japanese government announced that its JASDF forces in Kuwait would withdraw soon, though it was announced that the withdrawal was due to the improving security situation and the nearing expiration of the United Nations Security Council Resolution 1790, which allowed multinational forces to stay in Iraq until December 2008. The last JASDF forces left Kuwait on December 18, 2008.

=== Legacy ===
On April 17, 2008, the Nagoya High Court ruled that the dispatch of troops was partly unconstitutional.

== Unit Deployments ==
Contingent	Deployment
1st Contingent	February 3 – May 26, 2004
2nd Contingent	May 27 – August 29, 2004
3rd Contingent	August 30 – December 5, 2004
4th Contingent	August 30, 2004 – February 27, 2005
5th Contingent	February 28 – May 27, 2005
6th Contingent	May 28 – August 22, 2005
7th Contingent	August 23 – November 11, 2005
8th Contingent	November 12, 2005 – February 17, 2006
9th Contingent	February 18 – May 25, 2006
10th Contingent	May 26 – July 16, 2006

== See also ==
- Multinational force in Iraq
- Al Muthanna Task Group
- Overwatch Battle Group (West)
- Dancon/Irak
- Zaytun Division
- Thai Humanitarian Assistance Task Force 976 Thai-Iraq
