= Battle of Al Rumaythah =

Battle in the Iraq War

Coordinates: 31°31′34″N 45°12′23″E

Battle of Rumaythah
- Part of the Iraq War
- An Australian patrol from OBG(W) in Iraq, August 2006.
Date	26 September 2006
Location	Rumaythah, Iraq
Result	Australian tactical victory

Belligerents
Australia	Unknown Iraqi Insurgents

Commanders and leaders
Andrew Stevens	Unknown

Strength
60 personnel including infantry, snipers and cavalry	30 insurgents

Casualties and losses
No Australians killed	Possibly 5 killed

The Battle of Al Rumaythah (26 September 2006) was fought during the morning in the Iraqi town of Al Rumaythah, in Al-Muthanna province, between Australian forces of the Overwatch Battle Group (West) and unidentified Iraqi insurgents. The Australians had entered the town to hold discussions at the Iraqi Army barracks when they were engaged by a large number of insurgents in an intense exchange of fire during which a number of insurgents were killed. The incident lasted almost an hour and although a number of insurgents were killed it was considered to have been a well coordinated attack. The Australians then withdrew in good order with no casualties sustained. Although a small incident with few tactical—and no strategic—consequences, it was significant as being a rare contact involving Australian forces in Iraq after the end of the Invasion of Iraq. The incident was also the first time that Australian forces were directly targeted by Iraqi insurgents.

== Prelude ==
At 09:00 on 26 September 2006 an Australian force consisting of a 60-man element from OBG(W) arrived at the Iraqi Army barracks in Al Rumaythah to conduct a meeting with local stakeholders and to co-ordinate the training of Iraqi police and the reconstruction of the barracks itself. The group comprised infantry from 2 RAR and soldiers from 6 RAR mounted in Bushmaster PMVs as well as elements and cavalry from 2/14 LHR (QMI) mounted in ASLAVs, and was under the command of Major Andrew Stevens. In 2006, Al Rumaythah was a city of 75,000 people and had a reputation for violence and given the threat the Australians deployed snipers in over-watch positions around the barracks, as well as an infantry platoon. Nearby two cavalry ready-reaction groups were on standby.

== Battle ==
As the meeting commenced small groups of armed men were observed conducting surveillance of the Australian positions. During the next hour insurgents gathered throughout the town and soon after 1100 a rocket-propelled grenade was fired. The insurgents were moving in small groups through the town and appeared to be trying to encircle the barracks in order to conduct a deliberate assault and destroy the Australian force. For the next hour the barracks were attacked with grenades and small arms fire from ranges between 200 metres (220 yd) to 300 metres (330 yd).

In response the Australian snipers engaged the insurgents whilst the platoon to the west of the barracks held its ground. Support from USAF F-16s was requested and they were used to fly low and fast over the insurgents in an attempt to distract them. Covered by the infantry Major Steven's party subsequently left the barracks in Bushmasters, still under heavy fire. Although attempting to prevent the Australian withdrawal the insurgents failed to flank the barracks to the north and south and by 12:15 the Australians had successfully broken contact and left Al Rumaythah.

During the fighting the Australians used their standard suite of infantry weapons including the F-88 Austeyr and F-89 Minimi LSW, well as MAG-58 MGs and sniper rifles. The ASLAV and Bushmaster vehicles played a crucial role in protecting the soldiers and allowing them to break contact safely. Indirect fires and Close Air Support had been available during the contact, however the decision was made not to escalate the situation due to the proximity of civilians. Following the incident Australian commanders claimed that their soldiers had withdrawn in a disciplined manner and had put themselves at considerable risk to ensure the safety of civilians, whilst applying their fire in a careful and controlled manner.

== Aftermath ==
The Australians suffered no casualties, while insurgent casualties were difficult to determine with reports at least up to five being killed. Up to 30 insurgents were believed to have been involved in the battle, however their identity—for example whether they were Sunnis or Shia religious groups, or al-Qaeda was unable to be determined. The balaclava-clad insurgents were dressed mainly in black and armed with AK-47s and grenade launchers. Regardless, they were said to have fought in a well coordinated manner and had used considerable firepower against the Australians. After the battle it was claimed that the insurgents had used civilians as a shield from Australian fire. Despite this there were no reports of civilian casualties after the incident. Two of the Australian infantry section commanders were later awarded the Distinguished Service Medal for co-ordinating a successful fighting withdrawal over 250 metres (270 yd) of open ground.
