= Anthony Rawlins =

Australian army officer

- Military career
- Allegiance: Australia
- Branch: Australian Army
- Service years: 1986–2025
- Rank: Major General
- Nickname: Tony
- Unit: Royal Australian Armoured Corps
- Commands: Head Force Design (2022–25); Deputy Chief of Army (2018–22); 7th Combat Brigade (2016–18); Overwatch Battle Group (West) (2006–07); 2nd Cavalry Regiment (2006–08)
- Conflicts: Iraq War; War in Afghanistan
- Awards: Officer of the Order of Australia; Distinguished Service Cross

Major General Anthony John Rawlins is a retired senior officer of the Australian Army. He joined the army via the Australian Defence Force Academy in 1986 and was commissioned into the Royal Australian Armoured Corps. He has commanded the 2nd Cavalry Regiment (2006–08), Overwatch Battle Group (West) (2006–07) and 7th Combat Brigade (2016–18), and deployed on operations to Israel and Lebanon, Iraq and Afghanistan. He served as Deputy Chief of Army from 2018 to 2022, and was Head Force Design within the Vice Chief of Defence Force Group from 2022 to 2025.

== Career ==
Rawlins was appointed a Member of the Order of Australia in the 2019 Australia Day Honours. He was advanced to an Officer of the Order of Australia in the 2024 King's Birthday Honours for "distinguished service in responsible positions as the Deputy Chief of Army and Head Force Design Division."

Military offices
Preceded by Air Vice Marshal Steve Roberton	Head Force Design; 2022–2025	Succeeded by Air Vice Marshal Wendy Blyth
Preceded by Major General Jake Ellwood	Deputy Chief of Army; 2018–2022	Succeeded by Major General Natasha Fox
