= Multi-National Force – Iraq =

United States-led military command in Iraq from 2004 to 2009

- Multi-National Force-Iraq Shoulder Sleeve Insignia and Combat Service Identification Badge with a Lamassu below a seven-pointed star representing "the seven peoples of Iraq."
- Leaders: Raymond T. Odierno (2008–2009); David Petraeus (2007–2008); George W. Casey Jr. (2004–2007); Ricardo Sanchez (2003–2004)
- Dates active: 14 May 2004 – 31 December 2009
- Headquarters: Baghdad, Iraq
- Size: 112,000 (December 2009)
- Wars: the Iraq War and the war on terror
- Website: http://www.mnf-iraq.com/

The Multi-National Force – Iraq (MNF-I), often referred to as the Coalition forces, was a U.S.-led military command during the Iraq War from 2004 to 2009.

The vast majority of MNF-I was made up of U.S. Army forces. It supervised British, Australian, Polish, Spanish, and other countries' forces. It replaced the previous force, Combined Joint Task Force 7, on 15 May 2004. It was significantly reinforced during the Iraq War troop surge of 2007. MNF-I was reorganized into its successor, United States Forces – Iraq, on 1 January 2010.

The United Nations Assistance Mission for Iraq, which does humanitarian work and has a number of guards and military observers, has also operated in Iraq since 2003. The U.N. Assistance Mission in Iraq was not a part of the MNF-I, but a separate entity. The NATO Training Mission – Iraq, was in Iraq from 2004 to December 2011, where it trained the Iraqi Army and the Iraqi Police. This NATO mission was later followed by NATO Mission Iraq, which formed in 2018 at the request of the Government of Iraq to help build more sustainable, transparent, inclusive and effective Iraqi armed forces and security institutions.

== History ==
The MNF-I's objectives, as expressed in an annex to United Nations Security Council Resolution 1546, a June 2004 letter from U.S. Secretary of State Colin Powell to the U.N. Security Council, were stated to be:

The MNF under unified command is prepared to continue to contribute to the maintenance of security in Iraq, including by preventing and deterring terrorism and protecting the territory of Iraq. The goal of the MNF will be to help the Iraqi people to complete the political transition and will permit the United Nations and the international community to work to facilitate Iraq's reconstruction.

— Colin Powell, UNSCR 1546 (June 2004)

The majority of countries that deployed forces to Iraq generally confined them to their respective military installations, due to widespread violence throughout the country.

The government of Iraq enjoyed broad international recognition, including from constituent countries of the Arab League. Jordan assisted in training of Iraqi security forces, and the United Arab Emirates donated military equipment, though purchased from Switzerland.

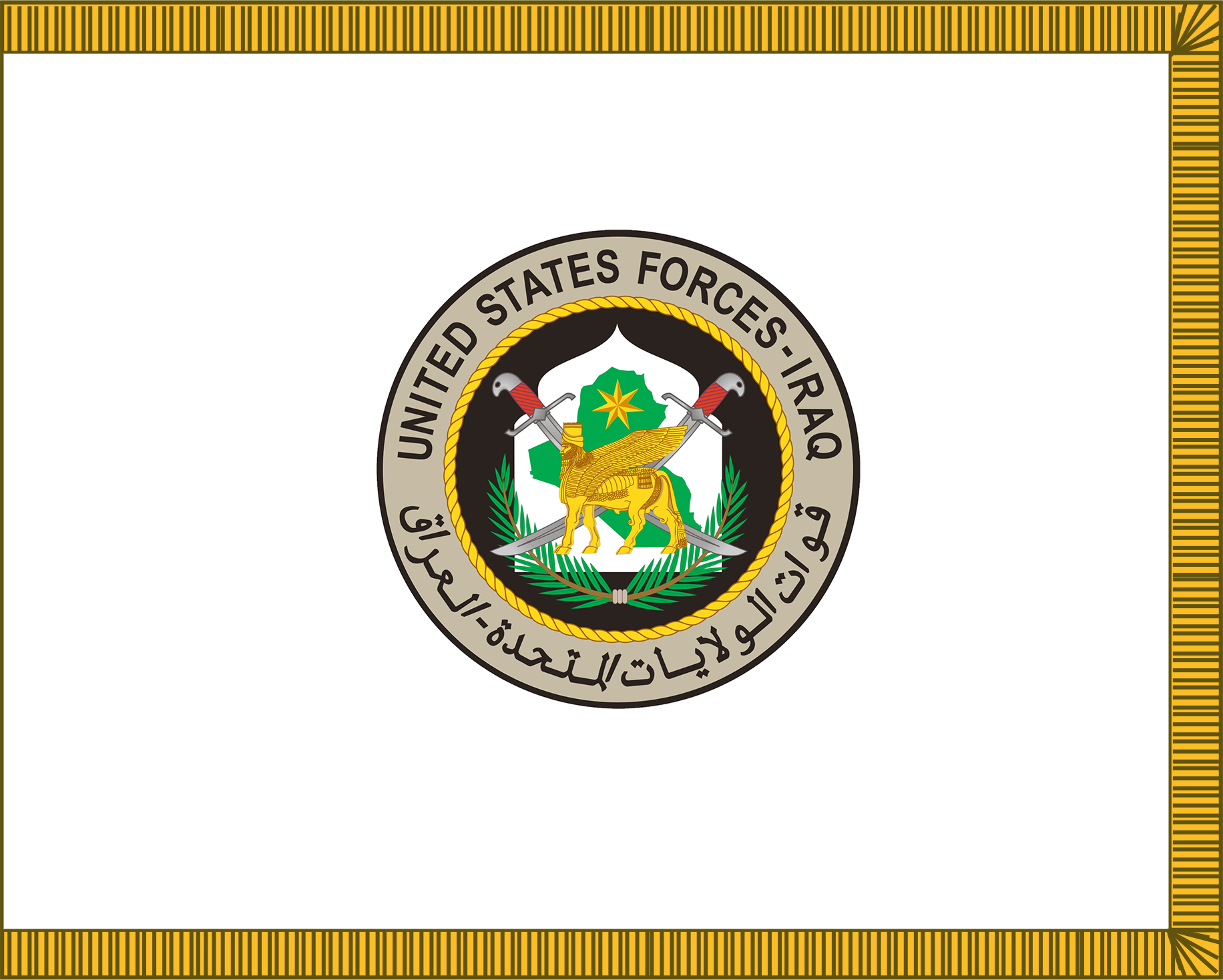
Multinational Force Iraq Flag

As of September 2008, over 545,000 Iraqi security forces have been trained.

In November 2006, the United Nations Security Council voted to extend the mandate of the multinational force in Iraq until the end of 2007. The move was requested by the Iraqi government, which said the troops were needed for another year while it built up its own security forces. In December 2007, the Security Council unanimously approved resolution 1790, which extended the mandate until 31 December 2008.

In December 2008, the American and Iraqi governments signed the U.S.–Iraq Status of Forces Agreement, which covered only American troops. It allowed them to remain in the country until 2011, but changed the status on several issues. Iraq regains sovereignty of its airspace, gains sovereignty over American contractors U.S. forces who commit crimes, if they are both off-duty and off base. The U.S. were given until 31 July 2009 to withdraw from Iraqi cities and the whole agreement was subject to a referendum of Iraqi voters held prior to 30 June 2009. If the referendum failed to approve the agreement, the Iraqi government would have given the U.S. until 31 July 2010 to withdraw completely.

On 18 December 2008 the Iraqi government published a law that covered the status of non-U.S. foreign forces in the country from the end of the U.N.'s mandate on 31 December 2008 through to their withdrawal on 31 July 2009. The Iraqi parliament voted on Saturday 20 December 2008, after a second reading of this law, to reject it and send it back to the Iraqi cabinet. The majority of Iraqi parliamentarians wanted it to be made into a binding international agreement rather than simply presenting it as a local Iraqi law. A compromise was reached and the law passed on 23 December 2008, with the Iraqi government agreeing to then sign bilateral agreements with the affected countries.

=== List of countries in the coalition ===
==== Troop deployment in Iraq 2003–2011 ====
Iraq War Coalition troop deployment
Troops at time of MNF-I deactivation	Deployed troops (2003–2011)	Deployed troops (2003–2007)
Total invasion deployment: Less than 200,000 troops; Multi-National Force – Iraq units: Multi-National Force – West; Multi-National Division – Baghdad; Multinational Division Central-South; Multi-National Division – North; Multi-National Division (South-East); Logistics Support Area Anaconda	NATO: A contingent of around 150 advisers under the collective command NATO Training Mission – Iraq (withdrawn 12/11); United States: 150,000 invasion 165,000 peak (withdrawn 12/11); United Kingdom: 46,000 invasion (withdrawn 5/11); Australia: 2,000 invasion (withdrawn 7/09); Poland: 200 invasion—2,500 peak (withdrawn 10/08); South Korea: 3,600 peak (deployed 5/03; withdrawn 12/08); Georgia: 2,000 peak (deployed 8/03; withdrawn 8/08); Ukraine: 1,650 peak (deployed 8/03; withdrawn 12/08); Romania: 730 peak (deployed 7/03; withdrawn 7/09); Denmark: 545 peak (deployed 4/03; withdrawn 12/08); Bulgaria: 485 peak (deployed 5/03; withdrawn 12/08); El Salvador: 380 peak (deployed 8/03; withdrawn 1/09); Czech Republic: 300 peak (deployed 12/03; withdrawn 12/08); Azerbaijan: 250 peak (deployed 8/03; withdrawn 12/08); Albania: 240 troops (deployed 4/03; withdrawn 12/08); Mongolia: 180 peak (deployed 8/03; withdrawn 09/08); Singapore: 175 offshore (deployed 12/03; withdrawn 12/08); Latvia: 136 peak (deployed 5/03; withdrawn 11/08); Croatia: 60 peak (deployed 7/03; withdrawn 12/08); Bosnia and Herzegovina: 85 peak (deployed 6/05; withdrawn 11/08); North Macedonia: 77 peak (deployed 7/03; withdrawn 11/08); Tonga: 55 troops (deployed 7/04; withdrawn 12/08); Armenia: 46 troops (deployed 1/05; withdrawn 10/08); Estonia: 40 troops (deployed 6/05; withdrawn 1/09); Kazakhstan: 29 troops (deployed 9/03; withdrawn 10/08); Moldova: 24 peak (deployed 9/03; withdrawn 12/08)	Italy: 3,200 peak (deployed 7/03; withdrawn 11/06); Netherlands: 1,345 troops (deployed 7/03; withdrawn 3/05); Spain: 1,300 troops (deployed 4/03; withdrawn 4/04); Japan: 600 troops (deployed 1/04; withdrawn 7/06); Thailand: 423 troops (deployed 8/03; withdrawn 8/04); Honduras: 368 troops (deployed 8/03; withdrawn 5/04); Dominican Republic: 302 troops (deployed 8/03; withdrawn 5/04); Hungary: 300 troops (deployed 8/03; withdrawn 3/05); Nicaragua: 230 troops (deployed 9/03; withdrawn 2/04); Norway: 150 troops (deployed 7/03; withdrawn 8/06); Portugal: 128 troops (deployed 11/03; withdrawn 2/05); Lithuania: 120 peak (deployed 6/03; withdrawn 08/07); Slovakia: 110 peak (deployed 8/03; withdrawn 12/07); New Zealand: 61 troops (deployed 9/03; withdrawn 9/04); Philippines: 51 troops (deployed 7/03; withdrawn 7/04); Iceland: 2 troops (deployed 5/03; withdrawal 8/07)

===== Clandestine deployment of Canadian forces =====
- Canada – According to the U.S. State Department, a total of 15 countries participated covertly. According to leaked U.S. diplomatic cables, despite the Canadian government's official position that they would not participate in the invasion, Canadian officials allegedly promised to clandestinely support it. In addition to naval vessels and personnel already in the region, Canadian officers, Major Generals Walter Natynczyk, Peter Devlin, and Nicholas Matern, served as Deputy Commanding Generals of Multi-National Corps – Iraq. and Canadian pilots flew Boeing C-17s into Iraq to "season" the flight crews. In 2003, Prime Minister Chrétien admitted that some Canadian troops could be serving alongside U.S. and British troops in Iraq. "It's possible," he said, "but they are not in combat roles." Canadian Defense Minister John McCallum refused to give Parliament details about the locations of Canadian soldiers in Iraq.

===== Notable deployment of military equipment =====
Norway – contributed with ARTHUR counter-battery radar systems, which pointed out 1,500 bombing targets during" the first days of the war (the British minister of defence, Geoff Hoon, thanked Norway for its "robust" contribution).

=== Countries that deployed troops to Iraq ===
==== 2011 withdrawals ====
- United Kingdom – 3,700 troops were in Southern Iraq, leading the Multi-National Division (South East), which includes troops from several other countries. The deployment includes infantry, mechanized infantry and armored units as well as water-borne patrol personnel and a range of aircraft. After the invasion (which involved 46,000 British troops), approximately 8,500 troops were stationed in the south of the country, but 1,300 were withdrawn in early 2006. The British government then gradually reduced the number of troops in Iraq until May 22, 2011 when all the remaining British troops left Iraq after the Iraqi government rejected their request to stay and to extend their mission. The UK had lost 179 soldiers in Iraq as of 12 February 2009: 136 in roadside bombings, firefights, and rocket attacks. Out of the remaining 43, the cause of death included accidents, 'friendly fire' incidents, illnesses, and suicide. See Operation Telic for further information.
- United States – In the cities, U.S. forces operate in support of Iraqi forces, and outside the cities U.S. forces operate in partnership with Iraqi forces. Support includes, for example, aerial surveillance, tactical advice, logistics, and intelligence, while partnership includes actual combat, for example patrolling, mine clearing, and serving arrest warrants. Additionally, a major line of operations is the logistical work of transporting millions of pieces of equipment back to the United States. On 1 January 2010 the five major command groups in the country were consolidated into a headquarters command called U.S. Forces – Iraq (USF–I), and MNF–I was deactivated. Subordinate commands (MNC–I, MNSTC–I, and Task Force 134), responsible for detainee operations, were also deactivated in the same ceremony and their responsibilities now fall under the aegis of USF–I. In August 2010 all U.S. combat operations in Iraq ceased, and by then it is planned that all combat brigades will be AABs. In accordance with the U.S.–Iraq Status of Forces Agreement, all U.S. troops were withdrawn from Iraq by December 31, 2011. On October 21, 2011, President Barack Obama confirmed that all U.S. military personnel would leave Iraq by the end of 2011. As of December 6, 2011 there were 4,485 U.S. soldiers killed in combat operations within Iraq. On December 15, 2011, the United States formally ended its mission in Iraq. On December 18, 2011, the United States completed its withdrawal from Iraq.

==== 2009 withdrawals ====
- Australia – Australia contributed 2,000 personnel to the 2003 Iraq invasion. The largest force was the Overwatch Battle Group (West), which comprised 515 soldiers based at Camp Terendak in Talil (Southern Iraq), which terminated operations on June 2, 2008 along with the attached Australian Army training team (composed of 60–95 personnel). The battle group was previously known as the Al Muthanna Task Group, which had about 450 troops and was deployed on 22 February 2005 to reinforce Task Force Eagle, a British Army Battlegroup, which had recently replaced outgoing Dutch forces in Al Muthana Province. The Australian military presence in Iraq ended on 28 July 2009 per an agreement with the Iraqi government. There have been several injuries but no deaths of Australian troops in Iraq attributed to hostile action, however, a SASR operator was killed in a vehicle accident in Kuwait, and a soldier named Jacob Kovco, assigned to the Baghdad SECDET, died from an accidental discharge of his pistol. (See also: Australian contribution to the 2003 invasion of Iraq)
- El Salvador – Salvadoran troops were involved in guarding convoys. The last Salvadoran troops left Iraq on 22 January. El Salvador lost five soldiers in Iraq, four in hostile incidents and one in an accident. Twenty soldiers were wounded.
- Estonia – Estonia has decided not to send a fresh troop contingent to Iraq, ending the involvement of units of up to 40 soldiers in the mission in Iraq since June 2003, Estonia's defence ministry announced in January. The mission officially ended on 7 February 2009. Their task was to conduct raids and combat patrols alongside American Forces in Baghdad and Fallujah. Two soldiers were killed in Iraq in separate insurgent attacks, 18 soldiers were wounded. Three staff officers remain with the NATO-led training mission in Iraq.
- Romania – Romania had originally had 730 soldiers (400 infantry, 100 military police, 150 de-miners, 50 intelligence officers, and 30 medics) deployed in Iraq. At its peak, it operated in three different zones (South-East, Central, and Baghdad). They performed a wide range of missions—prisoner interrogation at Camp Cropper and Camp Bucca in the American sector, reconnaissance and surveillance missions (often involving Romanian Air Force RQ-7 Shadow UAVs) in the Polish sector, and training, peacekeeping missions, and base protection missions in the British sector. Romania also temporarily deployed a force of 130 soldiers to support UNAMI, a Coalition force in Iraq working under the authority of the United Nations. The force was deployed in March 2005, and withdrawn after six months. Romania reduced it, first to 501 by November 2008, and by early 2009, Romania had reduced its contingent to 350. They were stationed in Nasiriyah and Al-Kut. In an agreement signed with Iraqi Defense Minister Abdul Qader al-Ubeidi and the Romanian ambassador, Romania promised to withdraw its troops on 31 July 2009. It had been previously announced on 6 November 2008 that Romania would withdraw its then 501-strong contingent by the end of the year and leave a small group of advisers to assist the Iraqi authorities. In 2008, the president announced that the troops would stay until 2011. However, under the terms of the SOFA agreement between the United States and Iraq, all non-US forces must leave Iraq prior to 31 July 2009. As a result, Romania decided to withdraw. Romania formally terminated its mission in Iraq on 4 June 2009, and pulled out its troops. On 23 July 2009 the last Romanian soldiers left Iraq. Three Romanian soldiers had been killed during their mission, and at least eight were wounded.

==== 2008 withdrawals ====
- Albania – Albania was one of the first countries participating in the invasion as they sent 70 troops to Iraq in April 2003. Albania increased its deployment from 120 to 240 in September 2008, with the new troops serving in a different, unspecified part of Iraq. Half of the troops were stationed at Mosul airport, where they manned guard towers and conducted internal and external patrols. On 17 December, the departure of all 240 Albanian troops, under U.S. command, was announced. Five soldiers were wounded during the deployment.
- Armenia deployed a total of 46 personnel divided into three units: a logistics platoon providing vehicles and drivers for supply convoys that run from Kuwait into the Polish sector of Iraq, an ordnance disposal engineer team attached to the Salvadoran contingent, and a medical unit at Camp Echo. On 5 December 2005 the Armenian government declared its intention to stay in Iraq for another year, and did the same on 6 December 2006. However, in October 2008, Armenia ended its military presence in Iraq, citing improved security and the ongoing withdrawal of a much larger Polish army contingent that has supervised Armenian troops deployed in the country.
- Azerbaijan – The original contingent numbered 150 troops, increasing to 250 after an additional 100 were sent on 29 December 2004, before decreasing to 88 by September 2007. They had been stationed in the vicinity of Haditha Dam in western Iraq, providing security for a nearby US Marine camp and patrolling the dam complex. The Azerbaijanis formally terminated their operations and handed over their mission to the Iraqis on 4 December 2008. One soldier, Rafael Seyidbala Agayev, died during the mission due to an unspecified cause.
- Bosnia and Herzegovina deployed a total of 85 soldiers. This included a unit of 36 troops involved in ordnance disposal in Diwaniyah. In August 2008, Bosnia and Herzegovina sent an additional 49 soldiers to help guard the US Camp Victory in Baghdad. A farewell ceremony for the Bosnian troops was held on 29 November 2008.
- Bulgaria – Bulgaria withdrew its original contribution of about 485 soldiers in 2005; the unit's objective had been guarding the city centre of Diwaniyah. From March 2006 to late 2008, this unit had guarded the headquarters of the MEK at Camp Ashraf, 100 km west of the Iranian border. On 17 December 2008 Bulgaria's last 155 troops stationed in Iraq returned home. 13 soldiers were killed during this deployment. At least five Bulgarian contractors were also killed by insurgents.
- Czech Republic – The original Czech contingent consisted of 300 troops and three civilians running a field hospital, operating under British command Multi-National Division (South-East) (Iraq). After 2006, the goal changed from training Iraqi police to providing Force Protection to Contingency Operation Base (Basrah Air Station) at the vehicle checkpoints. Two thirds of these soldiers were pulled out by late 2007, and 80 out of the remaining 100 were withdrawn in summer 2008 On 1 October 2008 it was announced that the remaining 17 Taji-based Czech troops, who were training Iraqi troops in the use of armoured vehicles, would be withdrawn in December, leaving five troops supporting the NATO Training Mission (NTM-I). On 4 December, a ceremony was held marking the end of the Czech mission. One Czech soldier died in May 2003 from injuries sustained in a vehicle accident in Iraq.
- Georgia – Role of Georgia in the Iraq War: Georgia's contingent originally consisted of 300 special forces troops under U.S. command in Baqouba, who guarded two bridges and three American Forward Operating Bases. Five hundred and fifty more troops were deployed in June 2005, ostensibly to serve as UNAMI guards, although they were placed under U.S. command on a dangerous 'Middle Ring Security' mission in the Green Zone. On 9 March 2007 Georgian President Mikhail Saakashvili announced his plans to increase total Georgian troop strength in Iraq to 2000, by sending an extra 1,200 troops and moving those already in Iraq to join the new unit. Politicians had already stated that the contingent would be reduced to 300 in summer 2008. Following the outbreak of war between Georgia and Russia on 8 August 2008, Mikhail Saakashvili said that Georgia was pulling its entire 2,000-strong contingent of troops from Iraq. During 10 and 11 August the US Air Force airlifted the whole contingent out of Iraq. The troops, all of whom had been trained by American instructors, were based east of Baghdad, close to the border with Iran. As of July 2008, five Georgian soldiers had died in Iraq (one in a vehicle accident, one committed suicide, while three were killed in combat) and 19 were wounded.
- Kazakhstan – 29 ordnance disposal experts were deployed to Kut, under Polish command. The contingent was withdrawn from Iraq on 21 October 2008, thereby concluding a five-year mission. One soldier was killed in 2005 along with eight Ukrainians when a pile of booby-trapped munitions was detonated by insurgents.
- South Korea – A farewell ceremony for the remainder of the Irbil-based South Korean contingent was held on 1 December 2008, with its withdrawal from Iraq scheduled for 5 December. Total of 20,308 troops had deployed. See Zaytun Division for further information.
- Latvia – Latvian troops were initially deployed to Kirkuk (under U.S. command) for a year, then transferred to Camp Charlie in Al Hillah, followed by Camp Delta in Al Kut. Finally, the Latvians were stationed at Camp Echo in Ad Diwaniyah where they conducted external security patrols. During their final posting, three Latvian soldiers were killed in action. On 18 June 2007, all but 7 of Latvia's 125 troops left Iraq. Four of the remainder left within two weeks, leaving three officers who participated in intelligence analysis and operational planning from July 2007 onwards. The last three Latvian soldiers concluded their mission on 8 November 2008.
- Lithuania – Lithuania originally deployed 120 troops to Iraq, approximately 50 under Polish command near Hillah (designation: LITDET), where they guarded Camp Echo; and an equal number under Danish command near Basra (designation: LITCON), where they conducted joint patrols with the Danish troops. The remainder served at various command centers throughout the country. The unit in the Polish sector was withdrawn during the course of 2006. Nine Lithuanian soldiers remain in Iraq under NTM–I. The remaining 33 members of the Lithuanian contingent arrived home on 1 August 2008.
- Macedonia – 77 soldiers under U.S. command in Taji conducted a wide range of missions including patrols, raids, training, and manning checkpoints. In 2007, it was announced that Macedonia would increase its contingent from 44 to 80 the following year. A farewell ceremony for the Macedonian troops was held on 26 November 2008, with the withdrawal of the contingent scheduled for the second half of December.
- Moldova – On 15 October 2008 it was announced that Moldova would withdraw its 20-member unit from Iraq before the end of the year. On 17 December, the U.S. military announced the withdrawal of the Moldovan contingent.
- Mongolia – The Mongolians, who originally numbered 180, had operated under Polish command and were tasked with guarding the main Polish base, Camp Echo. Prior to that posting, they had been protecting a logistics base dubbed 'Camp Charlie' in Hillah. All 100 troops were withdrawn on 25 September 2008.
- Poland – Following Polish involvement in the 2003 invasion of Iraq, 2,500 troops were deployed to the south of the country. Poland led the Multinational Division Central-South. The contingent was reduced in size from 2,500 to 1,500 in 2005. In January 2006 Polish troops handed over control of Babil province to U.S. troops and decided to remain on bases in Kut and Diwaniyah for the remainder of their mandate. Two months later, the number of troops was reduced to 900. These soldiers were pulled out in October 2008, following a dispute between President Lech Kaczyński and newly elected Prime Minister Donald Tusk over how long they should remain in the country. Twenty-two Polish soldiers were killed in Iraq, along with three security personnel and two journalists, one of whom was Waldemar Milewicz, a famous Polish war correspondent.
- Singapore – In general, Singapore's ships and aircraft return home after two or three months' deployment in the Persian Gulf, but there were no ground troops. Singapore's withdrawal was acknowledged on 23 December 2008.
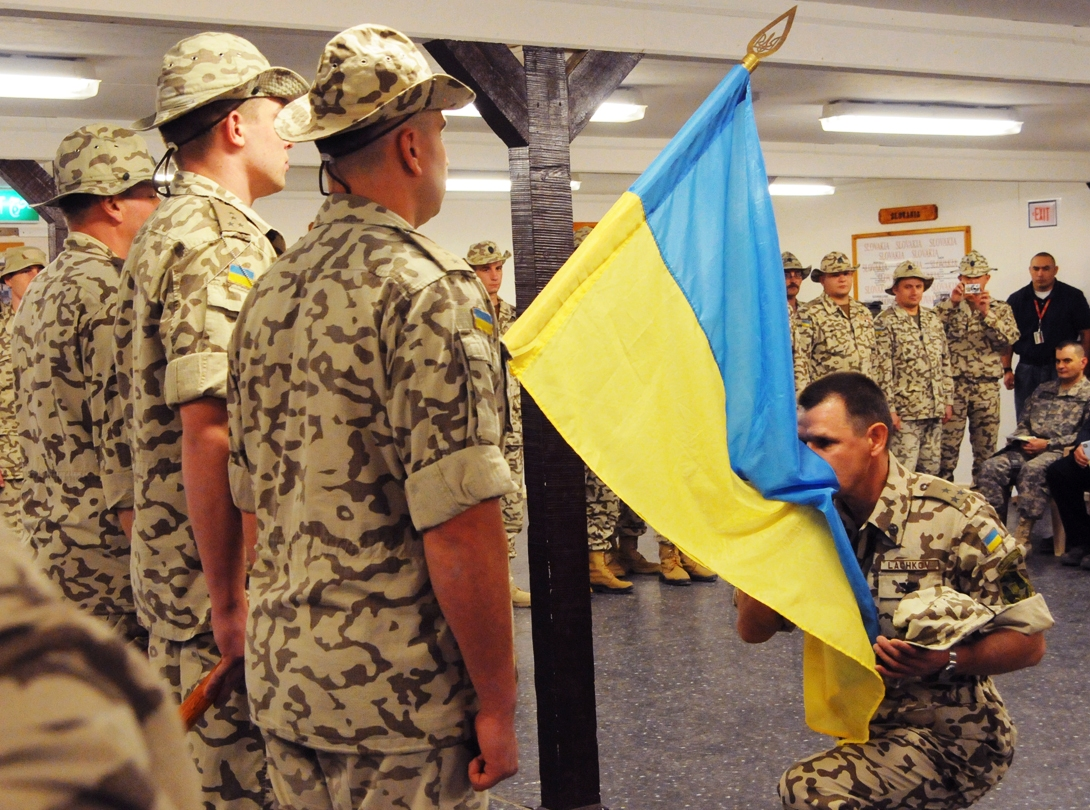
  Henadii Lachkov, commander of the Ukrainian contingent in Iraq, kisses his country's flag
- Tonga – A separate contingent of 45 Royal Marines had previously operated in Iraq from early July 2004 to mid-December 2004, augmenting the 1st Marine Expeditionary Force by guarding Camp Blue Diamond in Anbar Province. 55 Royal Marines were deployed in late 2007, guarding the command headquarters at Camp Victory in Baghdad. The Tongan unit concluded its mission on 5 December.
- Ukraine – An independent contingent, consisting of 1,650 troops from the 5th Mechanized Brigade, was deployed to Kut (South Central Iraq) in late 2003. In May 2005, the brigade was replaced with the 81st Tactical Group, numbering around 900 troops. A training team of around 40 troops remained in Diwaniyah & Al Kut until 9 December 2008. The deployment was then reduced continuously until the remaining 44 troops were pulled out on 22 December 2005. This fulfilled a long-planned withdrawal pledged by newly elected President Viktor Yushchenko. Ukraine suffered 18 fatalities: twelve in attacks, three in accidents, two in suicides and one as a result of a heart attack, while 33 were wounded or injured. Early in 2004, three Ukrainian engineers were taken hostage in Iraq but were freed shortly after.

==== 2007 withdrawals ====
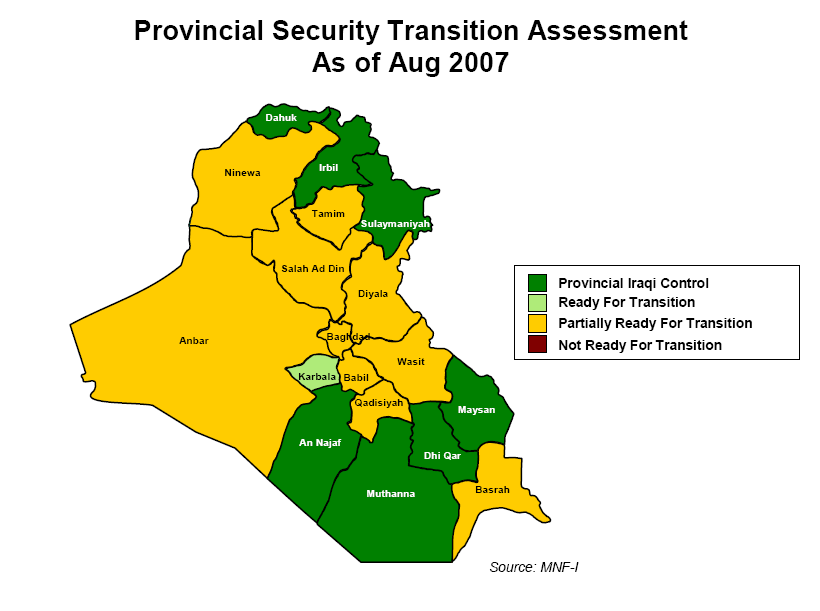
Provincial security transition assessment as of August 2007

- Denmark – By 21 December 2007 Denmark's main contribution to the Multinational Force in Iraq, a 55-member air force contingent based in Basra, had been completely withdrawn. Their task had been to operate a unit of four helicopters in support of British and Iraqi forces until December, following the withdrawal of the original contingent in July 2007. The Dancon/Irak mission consisted of 430 troops operating under UK command (South-East Iraq), and included military police involved in the training of local security forces as well as infantry. They were based south of Basra at "Camp Danevang".
  - A number of troops remained in Baghdad, Iraq, where they trained Iraqi forces under the NATO Training Mission – Iraq, but NTM-I was not part of the Multinational Force. Under the Iraqi Law agreed 16 December 2008 the NATO Training Mission was treated as the remaining non-US foreign contingents, with it to withdraw during 2009.
  - A separate unit of 35 troops temporarily served under UNAMI.
  - On 21 February 2007 Prime Minister Anders Fogh Rasmussen had announced that the withdrawal of Danish 'combat' troops in Iraq would be completed by August 2007, however, on 26 July 2007, it was reported that 250 of the Danish troops had already withdrawn, at least two weeks ahead of schedule. The Danish government repeatedly guaranteed that its forces would remain as long as the Iraqi government requested. On 28 April 2007 the Danish military reported that it was in the process of temporarily deploying an unspecified number of special forces to "resolve a special problem". Denmark has lost seven soldiers in Iraq; one to friendly fire, one in a vehicle accident, and five to hostile incidents, while several more have been wounded. In early 2006, the Iraqi insurgency released a statement calling for more attacks on the Danish army in the retaliation to the Danish cartoon controversy.
- Slovakia – On 27 January 2007 Slovak Prime Minister Robert Fico announced that all but 11 of the 110 Slovak troops (primarily engaged in destroying ordnance) operating under the US-led Coalition had been transferred from Diwaniya in Iraq to Kuwait. They arrived home the following month. The remaining troops were sent to perform liaison duties at the Multinational Forces HQ in Baghdad: nine were withdrawn in stages, while the last two returned by the end of the year. Four Slovak soldiers were killed by mortars and roadside bombs during their deployment in Iraq.

==== 2006 withdrawals ====
- Italy – The original contingent consisted of about 3,200 troops, but on 9 July 2005, former PM Berlusconi announced that Italian soldiers would gradually be withdrawn in groups of 300. New Prime Minister Romano Prodi had pledged to withdraw the troops in his first speech to the senate and called the war "a grave mistake that has complicated rather than solved the problem of security". Shortly after, on 26 May 2006, Italian foreign minister Massimo D'Alema announced that the Italian forces would be reduced from 1,800 to 1,600 by June. On 8 June, he said Italy's military presence in Iraq would end before 2007. On 21 September 2006, Italian forces handed over Dhi Qar province in southern Iraq to newly trained Iraqi security forces, thus ending their military mission. About a month earlier, on 23 August, the Italian contingent stood at 1,600 troops. The 'Garibaldi Brigade' served its final four-month tour of duty between May and September 2006, and included mechanized infantry, helicopters and Carabinieri in South Central Iraq, based around Nasiriyah. The Military of Italy lost 33 soldiers in Iraq. See Operation Ancient Babylon for more information.
- Japan – In early January 2004, 600 Japanese soldiers were deployed in Samawah and 6,100 cumulative till withdrawal in July 2006, Iraq in what was called the Japanese Iraq Reconstruction and Support Group. Most Japanese soldiers were there for humanitarian work and reconstruction, not combat, and were prohibited from opening fire on Iraqi insurgents unless fired on first. Japanese Special Forces soldiers and Australian soldiers provided security. Iraqi insurgents also threatened attacks against Japanese soil unless all Japanese forces were withdrawn from Iraq. Incidents like these furthered public demand in Japan that Japan withdraw from Iraq. Insurgents launched several mortar attacks on Japanese positions, but these caused no casualties. In July 2006 all Japanese soldiers were withdrawn from Iraq. There were no Japanese military casualties during the Operation.
- Norway – 140 of 150 troops (engineers and mine clearers) withdrawn on 30 June 2004 citing growing domestic opposition and the need for the troops elsewhere; the ten remaining staff officers assigned to MND-SE and MND CS had been withdrawn by August 2006. The Bondevik II government insists the troops were never part of the invasion force, citing a UN humanitarian mandate. This does not seem to have come to the attention of the international community, as Al-Qaeda has included Norway in videotaped threats on at least two occasions, and U.S. organizations have included Norway on their lists of participating nations.

==== 2005 withdrawals ====
- Netherlands – An independent contingent of 1,345 troops (including 650 Dutch Marines, three or four Chinook helicopters, a military police unit, a logistics team, a commando squad, a field hospital and Royal Netherlands Air Force AH-64 attack helicopters) was deployed to Iraq in 2003, based in Samawah (Southern Iraq). On 1 June 2004 the Dutch government renewed their stay until 2005. The Algemeen Dagblad reported on 21 October 2004 that the Netherlands would pull its troops out of Iraq in March 2005, which it did, leaving half a dozen liaison officers until late 2005. The Netherlands lost two soldiers in separate attacks.
- Portugal – had 128 military policemen (GNR – Guarda Nacional Republicana) under Italian command (South East Iraq). These troops were withdrawn on 10 February 2005, two days ahead of schedule.

==== 2004 withdrawals ====
- Dominican Republic – 302 troops withdrawn by the end of May 2004, shortly after Spain and Honduras withdrew their contingents, citing growing domestic opposition and the fall from power of PRD candidate Hipólito Mejía and the election of center-left PLD candidate Leonel Fernández to the presidency in 2004. The decision to withdraw came just two days after President Mejia promised to keep the troops in Iraq until the expiration of their mandate in August. Dominican troops were under constant mortar attacks but suffered no casualties. While in Iraq, the troops were under Spanish command (South East Iraq).
- Honduras – 368 troops withdrawn by the end of May 2004 along with Spain's contingent, citing that the troops were sent there for reconstruction, not combat. While in Iraq, the troops were part of the Spanish led Plus Ultra Brigade in South East Iraq.
- Hungary – Hungary's contingent of 300 transportation troops had begun arriving home in Budapest from Iraq on 22 December 2004, reported by the AFP. All of Hungary's troops were reported by the Defence Ministry to have left Iraq by the end of that day. While in Iraq, one Hungarian soldier was killed in an insurgent attack.
- Iceland – Iceland had two Explosive Ordnance Disposal Soldiers prior to their withdrawal.
- New Zealand – Two rotations of 61 military engineers, known as Task Force Rake, operated in Iraq from 26 September 2003 to 25 September 2004. They were deployed to undertake humanitarian and reconstruction tasks consistent with UN Security Council Resolution 1483; they were not part of the invading force. While in Iraq the unit was under British command (South East Iraq) and was based in Basra.
- Nicaragua – 230 troops left in February 2004, no replacement, attributed to financial reasons. While in Iraq, the troops were under Spanish command.
- Philippines – 51 medics, engineers and other troops led by Jovito Palparan were withdrawn on 14 July 2004 in response to the kidnapping of a truck driver. When the hostage takers' demands were met (the withdrawal of Filipino troops from Iraq), the hostage was released. While in Iraq, the troops were under Polish command (Central South Iraq). During that time, three Filipino soldiers were wounded in an insurgent attack, although none died.
- Spain – had 1,300 troops (mostly assigned to policing duties) in Najaf and commanded, through the Plus Ultra Brigade, the troops of Honduras, El Salvador, the Dominican Republic, and of Nicaragua. Newly elected Prime Minister José Luis Rodríguez Zapatero fulfilled one of his campaign pledges and declared the end of the mission on 28 April 2004 with the withdrawal of the last 260 troops. While in Iraq, Spain lost 11 military personnel: ten killed in insurgent attacks and one in an accident.
- Thailand – Thai Humanitarian Assistance Task Force 976 Thai-Iraq Withdrawal of the last 100 troops from Thailand's 423-strong humanitarian contingent was completed on 10 September 2004, in accordance with Thailand's mandate in Iraq, which expired in September. Thailand lost two soldiers in Iraq in an insurgent attack.

=== Public relations ===
==== YouTube ====
In early March 2007, Multi-National Force – Iraq announced that it had launched an official YouTube channel for the first time. The channel's videos have over eight million views.

The stated purpose of the YouTube channel is to "document action as it appeared to personnel on the ground and in the air as it was shot." The video clips posted to the site are edited for "time, security reasons, and/or overly disturbing or offensive images."

== Commanders ==
No.	Commander		Term			Service branch	Ref.
No.	Portrait	Name	Took office	Left office	Duration	Service branch	Ref.
1	Ricardo Sanchez	Lieutenant General; Ricardo Sanchez (born 1953)	14 June 2003	1 July 2004	1 year, 17 days	U.S. Army	
2	George W. Casey Jr.	General; George W. Casey Jr. (born 1948)	1 July 2004	10 February 2007	2 years, 224 days	U.S. Army	
3	David Petraeus	General; David Petraeus (born 1952)	10 February 2007	16 September 2008	1 year, 219 days	U.S. Army	
4	Raymond T. Odierno	General; Raymond T. Odierno (1954–2021)	16 September 2008	1 January 2010	1 year, 107 days	U.S. Army	

== Controversy ==
Critics of the war have argued that, in addition to direct incentives, the involvement of other members of the coalition was in response for indirect benefits, such as support for North Atlantic Treaty Organization membership or other military and financial aid. Estonian Foreign Minister Urmas Paet, stated in April 2006, that Estonian military forces were to remain in Iraq due to Estonia's "important partnership" with the United States.

=== Incentives given to MNF-I member countries ===
Many MNF-I member countries had received monetary gain, among other incentives from the United States, in return for their sending of military forces to Iraq, or otherwise supporting coalition forces during the Iraq War.

==== Georgia ====
Georgia, is believed to have sent soldiers to Iraq as an act of repayment for U.S. training of security forces that could potentially be deployed to the break-away regions of South Ossetia and Abkhazia. Indeed, Georgian troops that were sent to Iraq have all undergone these training programs.

==== Turkey ====
Turkey was offered approximately $8.5 billion in loans in exchange for sending 10,000 peacekeeping troops in 2003. Even though the United States did say the loans and the sending of troops to Iraq were not directly linked, it also said the loans are contingent upon "cooperation" on Iraq. The Turkish government swiftly rejected all offers of financial aid, and on 1 March 2003, the Turkish Grand National Assembly rejected sending military forces to help participate in the 2003 invasion of Iraq. The decision of the Turkish parliament to do so, at the time, was seen as both a response against American interests in the Middle East, and a desire to keep Turkey out of the Iraq War. The Turkish government, however, allowed all humanitarian flights into and out of Turkey, such as the airlifting of wounded coalition forces.

==== United Kingdom ====
In March 2006, British newspaper, The Independent, reported that companies based within the United Kingdom had received at least £1.1bn in contracts for reconstruction work in post-invasion Iraq.

== Deaths ==
When U.S. forces withdrew in December 2011, 4,804 coalition military personnel had been killed in Iraq. This list, which includes withdrawn countries, lists those deaths.

Coalition fatalities
Country	Deaths	Reference(s)
United States	4,486	
United Kingdom	179	
Italy	33	
Poland	23	
Ukraine	18	
Bulgaria	13	
Spain	11	
Denmark	7	
El Salvador	5	
Georgia	5	
Slovakia	4	
Latvia	3	
Romania	3	
Estonia	2	
Thailand	2	
Australia	2	
Netherlands	2	
Kazakhstan	1	
South Korea	1	
Hungary	1	
Czech Republic	1	
Azerbaijan	1	

== See also ==
- Coalition of the willing – Group of countries that supported the 2003 United States-led invasion of Iraq
- Combined Joint Task Force – Operation Inherent Resolve – Task force created to fight the Islamic State
- Coalition of the Gulf War
- Multinational Force–Ukraine – Proposed force for peace enforcement
