= Battle of Route Bismarck =

- Part of Iraq War
Date	23–24 April 2007
Location	Route Bismark, Dhi Qar Province, Iraq

Belligerents
Australia	Iraqi insurgency

Casualties and losses
3 wounded	Unknown

The Battle of Route Bismarck was a series of military engagements fought between Australian forces from Overwatch Battle Group (West) 2 in southern Iraq, and Anti-coalition insurgents over the period 23–24 April 2007. The engagements occurred on Route Bismarck, the Secondary Supply Route (SSR) within Dhi Qar Province, Iraq. Three Australians were wounded by IEDs which also damaged a number of ASLAVs, while a number of insurgents were killed or wounded by the Australians in the fighting that ensued.
