= 5th/7th Battalion, Royal Australian Regiment =

- Active: 1973–2006; 2024–present
- Country: Australia
- Branch: Army
- Type: Infantry
- Role: Littoral
- Part of: 1st Brigade
- Garrison/HQ: Darwin
- Nickname: The Tigers
- Motto: Duty First
- Colors: Gold and maroon
- March: Dominaise
- Mascot: Sumatran tiger "Quintus Secundus"

Commanders
- Colonel-in-Chief: HM The King (Royal Australian Infantry Corps)
- Notable commanders: Simon Gould, DSC; Michael Tucker, MBE

Insignia
- Unit colour patch
- Tartan: Australian (Pipers kilts and plaids)

The 5th/7th Battalion, The Royal Australian Regiment (5/7 RAR) is a regular littoral infantry battalion of the Australian Army. The battalion is based at Robertson Barracks in Holtze, Northern Territory and forms part of the 1st Brigade. It was originally formed in 1973 by the linking of the 5th and 7th Battalions of the Royal Australian Regiment together. It was de-linked on 3 December 2006, as part of the expansion of the Australian Army whereby the 5th and 7th Battalions of the Royal Australian Regiment were re-established as separate battalions. The battalions were re-linked on 10 December 2024.

== History ==
5/7 RAR was formed on 3 December 1973 at Holsworthy Barracks in Sydney by the amalgamation of the 5th and 7th Battalions of the Royal Australian Regiment to form a single light infantry battalion. This was the result of reductions in the size of the Australian Army following the Vietnam War. Throughout the battalion's history 5/7 RAR formed part of the 1st Brigade.

In January 1975 the battalion deployed to Darwin as part of the clean-up following Cyclone Tracy. Between 1976 and 1978 5/7 RAR trialed a mechanised infantry organisation using M113 armoured personnel carriers. The value of this mechanisation was demonstrated when the battalion was able to quickly respond to the Sydney Hilton bombing in 1978 by guarding the route between Holsworthy and the site of the Commonwealth Heads of Government Regional Meeting at Bowral. While the mechanisation trial was judged a success, it was decided that only one of 5/7 RAR's companies would be mechanised, with the mechanised role rotating between the battalion's rifle companies every 12 months. The battalion was fully mechanised in 1984 and in 1986 the battalion's official title was changed to 5/7 RAR (Mech).

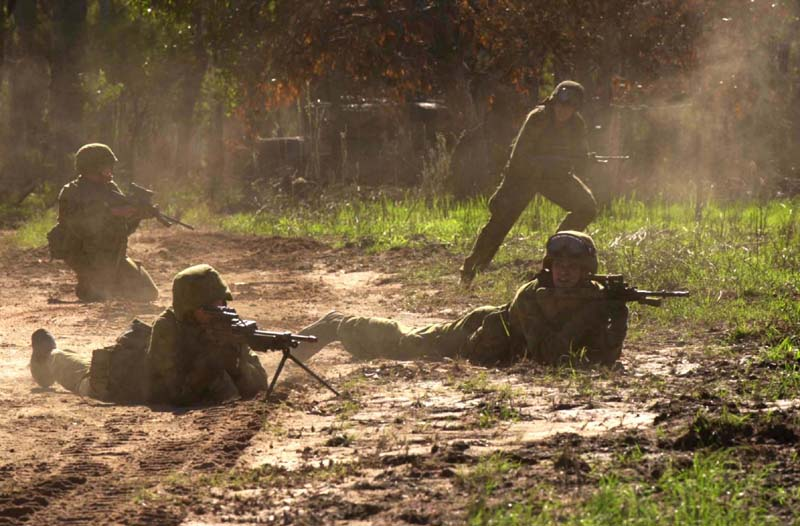
Soldiers from 5/7 RAR during an exercise in 2001

In 1999 5/7 RAR relocated from Holsworthy to Darwin. Later that year the battalion made its first operational deployment when it deployed to East Timor as part of INTERFET and transitioning in February 2000 as the 1st AUSBATT of the UNTAET mission. This deployment proved highly successful, with 5/7 RAR providing the force with a powerful and highly mobile battalion. After a seven-month tour, the battalion returned to Australia shortly after ANZAC Day 2000. 5/7 RAR served a second tour in East Timor between October 2002 and May 2003, though it operated largely as a light infantry battalion on this deployment. The deployment also included a company of General Reserve soldiers, drawn largely from the Royal Victoria Regiment and the Royal New South Wales Regiment.

5/7 RAR's final deployments were to Iraq. In 2004 5/7 RAR provided two rifle companies (C and D Companies) for security duties in Baghdad. During 2005 and 2006 a rifle company (B Company) from the battalion formed part of the Al Muthanna Task Group in southern Iraq. 5/7 RAR provided the headquarters (C Company) and support elements of the second rotation of the Task Group from November 2005 – April 2006. The rifle company in Iraq was mounted in ASLAVs from the 2nd Cavalry Regiment as it was judged that these fast and well armed vehicles were better suited to conditions in Iraq than 5/7 RAR's elderly M113A1s.

On 24 August 2006, Prime Minister John Howard announced the Enhanced Land Force plan that two new battalions would be established in two stages, with one eventually to be based in Adelaide and the other—8th/9th Battalion, Royal Australian Regiment—in south-east Queensland. The first of the two new battalions would be formed by splitting the 5/7 RAR creating the separate 5th and 7th Battalions, with the 5th Battalion remaining at Robertson Barracks, while the 7th would be relocated to Adelaide.

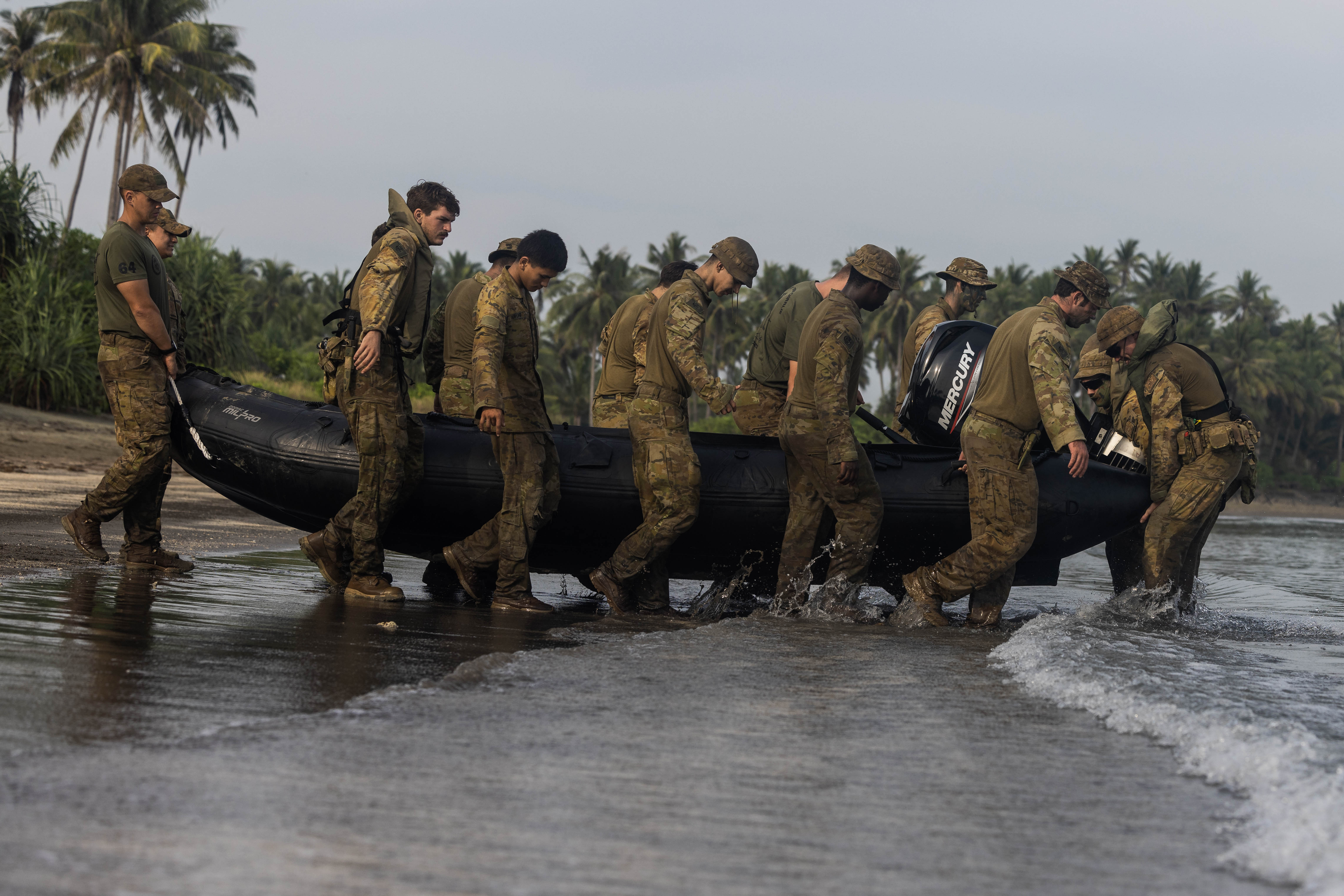
5/7 RAR soldiers launching an inflatable boat in 2025

On 3 December 2006, the 5th/7th Battalion was formally de-linked into its antecedent units. At the time D Company, 5/7RAR was serving as a part of Overwatch Battle Group (West) in Southern Iraq, while B Company 5/7RAR was serving with the 1st Reconstruction Task Force in Afghanistan. As a result, the operational establishment of the new units was undertaken during 2007.

As part of the 2023 Defence Strategic Review, it was decided to relink the 5th/7th Battalion and convert it to a littoral light infantry battalion. The Battalion was reformed on 10 December 2024 at a parade held in Robertson Barracks, Darwin. The first CO of the re-raised Battalion is LTCOL Hugh Michael Grogan.

== Structure ==
5/7 RAR consisted of:

- Battalion Headquarters
- Three mechanised infantry companies (B, C & D Companies)
- Support Company
- Administration Company
- Technical Support Company
- Training Company (A Company)

All elements of the battalion were mechanised with M113A1 armoured personnel carriers.

Prior to 2002 there was no Alpha Company. However from 2002-2003 the battalion stood-up Alpha Company in order to deploy a full company of Army Reservists to East Timor as part of Op Citadel and UNTAET. Alpha Company was temporarily disbanded after 12 months at the end of Op Citadel when the reservists rejoined their reserve units.

== Role ==
5/7 RAR was Australia's only mechanised infantry battalion. Under the doctrine developed by 1st Brigade, 5/7 RAR combined with 1st Armoured Regiment to form two battle groups (one ‘infantry heavy’ and one ‘armour heavy’).

In 2025, "the battalion completed its evolution into a light infantry battalion optimised for littoral manoeuvre and air mobility."

== Pipes and drums ==
The 5th/7th Battalion maintained one of only three pipe bands in the Australian regular army. The pipes and drums were inherited from the 7th Battalion in 1973 upon the amalgamation with the 5th Battalion. Initially, the pipes and drums had no tartan, until in 1979 the Gordon tartan was adopted in recognition of the battalion's alliance with the Gordon Highlanders. In 1992, the new Australian tartan was adopted by both the 5th/7th Battalion and the 2nd Battalion. The pipes and drums served as combat medics.

== Alliances ==
- United Kingdom – Welsh Guards (from 5th Battalion, RAR)
- United Kingdom – The Highlanders (from 7th Battalion, RAR)
