= Security Detachment Iraq (Australia) =

SECDET
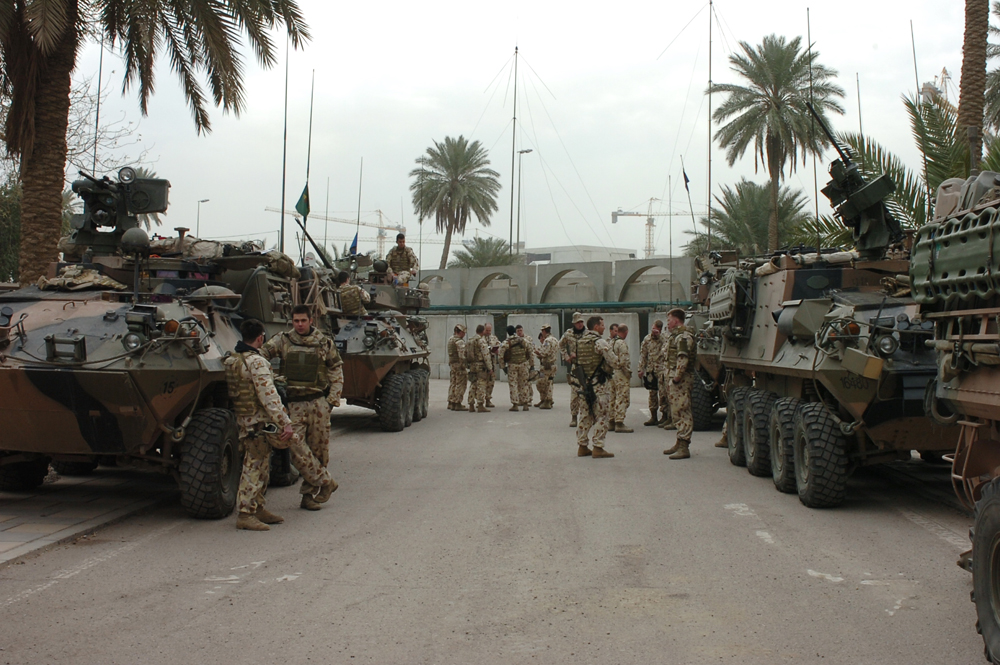
- Members of SECDET X prepare for a mission in March 2007
- Active: 2003–2011
- Country: Australia
- Branch: Army
- Role: Embassy security
- Size: Combat Team
- Garrison/HQ: Baghdad, Iraq

The Security Detachment Iraq (SECDET Iraq) was the final component of Australia's contribution to coalition operations in Iraq. SECDET was based on an Australian Army combined arms combat team consisting of an infantry company group and a troop of cavalry which operated the Australian Light Armoured (ASLAV) vehicles. There was also a three man EOD Team from various Combat Engineer Regiments. The force's duties included static security guarding at the Australian Embassy in Baghdad and the protection of Australian diplomats by the 1st MP Bn (CPPT) and Cavalry (RAAC) escort/protection, also vehicle convoys.

== History ==
SECDET was stood up in 2003.

SECDET was withdrawn in August 2011, with the firm Unity Resources Group becoming responsible for providing security for Australia's diplomatic presence in Iraq.

== Incidents ==
SECDET III engaged and destroyed an insurgent mortar team that had been firing on the Coalition Headquarters in the Green Zone. This was the first time an Australian ASLAV had used its 25mm Main Gun in combat.

SECDET IV had a Vehicle Borne Improvised Explosive Device (VBIED) detonate across the street from their HQ during their tour. SECDET IV was also involved in a serious accident when an ASLAV rolled at high speed.

SECDET V was involved in a VBIED attack on 25 October 2004, just short of an International Zone checkpoint, with the patrol suffering four wounded in action and serious damage to an ASLAV-25. As a direct result of the incident, Trooper Matthew Millhouse died of his injuries in 2015. He is listed on the Australian War Memorial Honour Roll as a casualty of the Iraq War.

SECDET V was also involved in two incidents in the northern city of Tall Afar on 8 and 10 December 2004, when 3 Troop, A Squadron of the 2nd Cavalry Regiment was ambushed by insurgents using small arms and rocket propelled grenades. The first incident involved the troop providing an armoured convoy escort to a US engineer unit travelling to Al Kasik. The convoy was ambushed in Tal Afar with the majority of the Australian callsigns returning fire from 25mm and .50cal. The second incident occurred a couple of days later in roughly the same location. The patrol was ambushed with insurgents using IED’s, small arms and rocket propelled grenades. The troop again returned fire en masse. During these firefights, the insurgents suffered unknown injuries and casualties, however no damage was inflicted on the Australian patrol.

SECDET VI had a VBIED detonate both on an ASLAV patrol on Route Irish and also on their HQ in Baghdad during their tour.

Private Jacob Kovco was a member of SECDET IX in 2006.

== Deployments ==
Deployment	Dates	Composition	Notes
SECDET	May–September 2003	V32A patrol- C Squadron, 2nd Cavalry Regiment.; 5 Platoon, B Company, 2 RAR; 1st MP Bn; EOD Team from 3rd Combat Engineer Regiment	
SECDET II	Sep 2003 - Jan 2004	V12 - A Squadron, 2nd Cavalry Regiment; A Company, 2 RAR; 1st MP Bn	
SECDET III	2004	3 Troop, B Squadron, 2nd Cav Regt; A Company, 3 RAR; 1st MP Bn	
SECDET IV	2004	3 Troop C Squadron, 2 CAV REGT; D Company, 5/7 RAR; 1st MP Bn	
SECDET V	2004	3 Troop A Squadron, 2 Cav Regt; C Company, 5/7 RAR; 1st MP Bn	
SECDET VI	2004	A Company, 6 RAR; 1st MP Bn	
SECDET VII	2004–05	C Company, 6 RAR; Troop, 2/14 LHR (QMI); 1st MP Bn	SECDET VII had a strength of approx. 60 soldiers
SECDET VIII	2005	B Company, 1 RAR; Troop, 2/14 LHR; 1st MP Bn	
SECDET IX	2005–06	Support Company, 3 RAR; Troop, 2/14 LHR (QMI); Elements, 1st MP Bn	Private Jacob Kovco was a member of SECDET IX
SECDET X	2006	A Company, 3 RAR; Elements, 2 Cavalry Regt and 2/14 LHR (QMI); Elements, 1st MP Bn	
SECDET XI	2007	A Company, 1 RAR; Troop, 2/14LHR (QMI); Elements, 1st MP Bn; Combat Service Support Element	
SECDET XII	2007	D Company, 6 RAR; Troop, 2/14 LHR (QMI); Elements, 1st MP Bn; Combat Service Support Element	
SECDET XIII	2008	A Company, 7 RAR; Troop, 2nd Cavalry Regt; Elements, 1st MP Bn; Combat Service Support Element	The infantry component included a section of RAAF Airfield Defence Guards from No. 2 Airfield Defence Squadron
SECDET XIV	2008–09	Combat team HQ, B Sqn, 2nd Cavalry Regiment; two infantry platoons, 5 RAR; 3 Troop, B Sqn, 2nd Cavalry Regt; Elements, 1st MP Bn; Combat Service Support Element	The infantry platoons were reinforced by members of No. 2 Airfield Defence Squadron
SECDET XV	2009	Company HQ and two infantry platoons, 2 RAR; Troop, 2nd Cavalry Regt; Elements, 1st MP Bn; Combat Service Support Element	
SECDET XVI	2010	2/14 LHR (QMI) Headquarters; Cavalry Scout Troop from 2/14 LHR QMI (A & C SQN); Elements, 1st MP Bn; Combat Service Support Element	Transition from ASLAV based patrols to upgraded B6 armoured vehicles, then handing over to URG. Last Detachment to SECDET with frontline involvement and drew down from approx. 80 personnel to under 10 on SECDET XVII (HQ only).

== See also ==
- Australian contribution to the 2003 invasion of Iraq
- Australian Embassy Guard Platoon, Saigon
