= 2nd/14th Light Horse Regiment =

Regiment of the Australian Army

2nd/14th Light Horse Regiment (Queensland Mounted Infantry)
- Cap badge of the 2nd/14th Light Horse Regiment
- Active: 1930–40; 1949–Present
- Country: Australia
- Branch: Army
- Type: Light horse
- Role: Armoured cavalry
- Part of: 7th Brigade
- Garrison/HQ: Gallipoli Barracks
- Motto: Forward
- March: Quick – Soldiers of the Queen; Slow – Duke of York
- Engagements: Boer War; World War I

Commanders
- Current commander: Lieutenant Colonel Tom Johnson
- Colonel-in-Chief: The King (Colonel-in-Chief, RAAC)

Insignia
- Unit colour patch
- Abbreviation: 2/14 LHR (QMI)

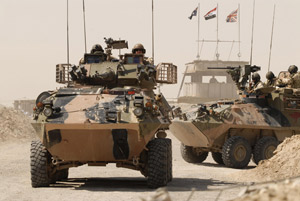
2/14 LHR ASLAVs in Iraq in 2006

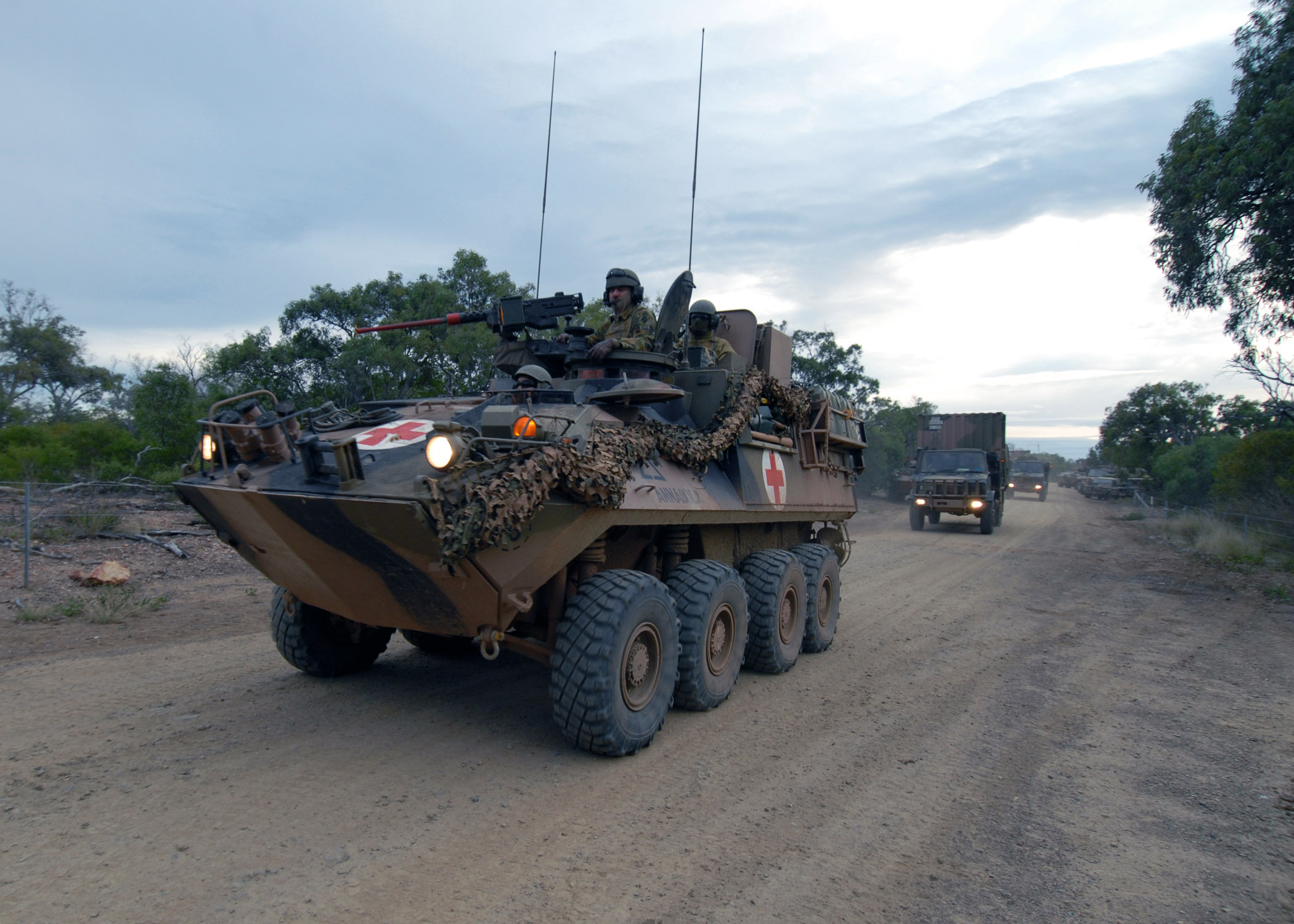
An ASLAV from the 2nd/14th at Shoalwater Bay training area.

The 2nd/14th Light Horse Regiment (Queensland Mounted Infantry) is a regiment of the Australian Army and forms part of the Royal Australian Armoured Corps. The regiment is an Australian Light Horse unit, and has been widely romanticised and popularised in literature and poetry throughout the 20th century. The unit sentimentally traces its lineage to 1860 and is the oldest Australian Regular Army unit through antecedent units the 2nd Moreton Light Horse (QMI) and the 14th West Moreton Light Horse (QMI). The regiment is assigned to 7th Brigade based in Brisbane and is equipped with the Boxer Combat Reconnaissance Vehicle and the Australian Light Armoured Vehicle (ASLAV) Reconnaissance Vehicle.

== History ==
=== Formation ===
The lineage of what is now known as the Queensland Mounted Infantry is quite convoluted and less linear than sentiment would suggest. Initially after the Russian scare of the Crimean War when every state in Australia carried a paranoid belief that they were the secret targets of the Russian invasion fleet, the response was to establish militia units to confront this menace. In Queensland, this culminated in a group of enthusiastic horsemen creating the Queensland Mounted Rifles in 1860 with two troops formed at Brisbane and Ipswich. This experiment lasted until 1863 when numbers dropped off and the Brisbane troop was disbanded. The Ipswich troop was renamed the Queensland Light Horse in 1864 and remained so until it too suffered declining number and was disbanded in 1866.

The next round of enthusiasm followed the impetus of the Sudan War. New South Wales sent a contingent but Queensland's militia was so run down that nothing could be arranged to match the effort of the southern colony. Embarrassment and enthusiasm led to the formation in 1885 of the Queensland Mounted Infantry. The underlying operational principle was autonomous recruitment catchment areas located at Moreton Bay, Bundaberg, Gympie, Mackay and Townsville. The Moreton Bay Mounted Infantry comprised two troops, Brisbane and Beenleigh.

By 1897 this distributed arrangement proved too cumbersome and expensive to maintain for a government that was almost bankrupt. All the disparate mounted units were re-designated as companies and amalgamated into one regiment called the Queensland Mounted Infantry (QMI).

=== Boer War, 1899–1902 ===
The Boer War (1899–1902) acted as the next stimulus to large scale recruitment. The QMI was reformed into four battalions which from thence forward, outlined the territorial divisions of the militia formation. From this the 1st Battalion, QMI, encompassing the Moreton Bay region was formed in 1900. Its territorial boundaries remained consistent throughout its various permutations until disbandment in 1943.

Since the QMI was formed specifically for local defence, there were no legal provisions allowing the mobilisation of these units for overseas expeditionary service to South Africa. To overcome this hurdle, separate units were formed in Queensland which also bore the name QMI and initially the 1st QMI was recruited mostly from volunteers from the Militia. Three contingents consisting of four companies were raised exclusively through this method. However, the QMI that served in South Africa had no legal nor historical ties to the Militia QMI.

The financial burden on such a government whose revenues were devastated by depression, drought and then Federation, could no longer afford to send men to South Africa while maintaining a partially paid Militia. To solve this problem, the Imperial Government pledged to fund in toto additional units raised in Queensland. After overcoming the problem of pay (Imperial rates of pay for a private was 2/6d per day while the Australian pay was generally 5/- per day, or double the Imperial rate) which almost scuttled this scheme, three Bushmen contingents were raised and saw service in South Africa.

Federation in 1901 brought with it a remodelling of the Australian defence forces on 1 July 1903 when this unit was given the name 13th (Queensland Mounted Infantry) Australian Light Horse (13th (QMI) ALH). A re-organisation of Australian defences as a consequence of the 1910 Kitchener Report led to the creation of Military Districts. Queensland was designated as the 1st Military District. Military units renamed throughout Australia using Queensland as the beginning numbers and so the 13th (QMI) ALH became the 2nd (QMI) ALH.

=== World War I, 1914–1918 ===
During World War I, Queensland raised three expeditionary Light Horse Regiments, they being the 2nd Light Horse Regiment, 5th Light Horse Regiment, and the composite 11th Light Horse Regiment whose "C" Squadron was raised in South Australia. These were raised as part of the Australian Imperial Force and so in no way had any connections with militia units of the same name. (To avoid confusion, militia units retained the designation "Australian Light Horse (ALH)" while the AIF formations used "Light Horse Regiment (LHR)".) There was no connection between the Militia 2nd (QMI) ALH and the AIF 2nd LHR despite men from the 2nd (QMI) ALH enlisting in the 2nd LHR. Near the conclusion of the war, in July 1918, it was felt that militia units could be renamed to retain the unit number in which most men served in the AIF. In Queensland, it was fortuitous that both the Militia catchment area of the 2nd (QMI) ALH and the AIF 2nd LHR matched, so no name change occurred as did with other Australian militia units.

=== Inter bellum ===
Within Australia, post war budget cuts began to hit hard and by 1926, all regiments were ordered to drop one squadron, and so they bore two rather than three squadrons. The much reduced unit in 1927 was renamed the 2nd (Queensland Mounted Infantry) Moreton Light Horse. 14th (Queensland Mounted Infantry) West Moreton Light Horse took the title "14th" from the Regiment based in Townsville known as the 14th North Queensland Light Horse. This unit was converted from a mounted unit into an infantry formation during the 1926 reformation. The 14th (Queensland Mounted Infantry) West Moreton Light Horse was a newly formed unit with its catchment area around the Brisbane region rather than Townsville and so had little connection to the erstwhile 14th in everything but name and function.

Austerity hit even harder after the commencement of the Great Depression when there were cutbacks in personnel numbers and forced amalgamations of militia units. In Queensland, the 2nd (Queensland Mounted Infantry) Moreton Light Horse and 14th (Queensland Mounted Infantry) West Moreton Light Horse were combined in 1930 to form the 2nd/14th Light Horse Regiment. The regiment remained this way until World War II.

=== World War II, 1939–1945 ===
After the entry of the Japanese in the war, Australian homeland defences were hastily altered to meet the expected invasion. The 2nd/14th LHR was given a reconnaissance role and renamed as the 2nd (Queensland Mounted Infantry) Reconnaissance Battalion Moreton Light Horse. To give strength to the AIF, the unit was absorbed under its command structure and renamed the 2nd (AIF) Cavalry Regiment until it was disbanded in 1943.

In 1941, the 14th LHR was hived off from Queensland and transferred to the New South Wales command from which a new unit was raised being called the 14th Light Horse (Machine Gun) Regiment. Later this unit was renamed as the 14th Motor Regiment in 1942. On 8 May 1942, it was absorbed into the 2nd/4th Armoured Regiment thereby extinguishing both the regiment and name.

=== Post-war ===
In 1949, "A" Squadron, 2nd/14th Queensland Mounted Infantry (2nd/14th QMI) was reformed as an armoured car squadron, before being increased to a full regiment in 1950. In 1956, it converted to an anti-tank unit, equipped initially with 6-pounder and 17-pounder guns, before receiving 120 mm anti-tank guns and recoilless rifles.

In 1960, "A" Squadron became part of the regular army, eventually being transferred to become "B" Squadron, 1st Cavalry Regiment in 1966. At the same time, 2nd/14th QMI was re-designated as a cavalry regiment, re-equipping with armoured vehicles. The regiment was reduced to a squadron in 1976, before expanding again to a full regiment in 1980, being renamed the 2nd/14th Light Horse Regiment (Queensland Mounted Infantry) (2nd/14th LHR (QMI)) in 1981, equipped with the M113 vehicle in the armoured support role. In 1986, the regiment became an integrated unit consisting of Regular Army and Reserve soldiers. It converted to the reconnaissance role in 1992, and was re-equipped with the ASLAV vehicle between 2001 and 2004.

In March 2005, the regiment became a completely regular unit to meet the Army's increased operational tempo. Since this date elements of the regiment have made a number of operational deployments. 2nd/14th LHR (QMI) has contributed a number of SECDET rotations to Iraq. In 2006, A Squadron was deployed to Iraq to serve as part of the third rotation of the Al Muthanna Task Group which became the first rotation of Overwatch Battle Group (West). More recently the unit has contributed forces to the Australian Task Force in Afghanistan as part of Operation Slipper.

In October 2016 the Regiment began the process of being restructuring under Plan Beersheba, with B Squadron replacing its ASLAVs with M113AS4s to provide combat lift to the 7th Brigade. In 2017 C Squadron converted to the tank role and was equipped with the M1A1 Abrams MBTs, whilst under Plan Keogh B Squadron returned to the cavalry role and was again equipped with the ASLAV.

== Current composition ==
Currently the regiment is made up of:

- Regimental Headquarters (RHQ)
- A Squadron — Cavalry (equipped with the Boxer Block I CRV)
- B Squadron — Cavalry (equipped with Boxer Block II CRV)
- C Squadron — Cavalry (equipped with the ASLAV)
- Support Squadron (multiple AFV platforms)

== Battle honours ==
2nd Light Horse Regiment Moreton Light Horse (QMI)

- Boer War: South Africa 1899–1902;
- World War I: Anzac, Defence of Anzac*, Suvla, Sari Bair*, Gallipoli, Romani, Magdhaba-Rafah, Egypt 1915–1917, Gaza-Beersheba*, El-Mughar, Nebi Samwil, Jerusalem*, Jaffa*, Jericho*, Jordan (Es Salt), Jordan (Amman)*, Megiddo*, Nablus, Palestine 1917–1918

14th Light Horse Regiment West Moreton Light Horse (QMI)

- Boer War: South Africa 1899–1902*;
- World War I: Romani*, Maghaba-Rafah*, Egypt 1916–1917*, Gaza-Beersheba*, El-Mughar, Nebi Samwil, Jerusalem*, Jordan (Es Salt)*, Jordan (Amman)*, Megiddo*, Nablus*, Damascus*, Palestine 1917–1918

* denotes that the battle honour is emblazoned on the Guidons

== Established Relationships with Other Units ==
- United Kingdom – Household Cavalry Regiment
- United Kingdom – The Queen's Royal Hussars (Queen's Own and Royal Irish)
- New Zealand – Queen Alexandra's Mounted Rifles
- Canada – Royal Canadian Dragoons
- Australia – Australian Army Reserve – 4th/19th Prince of Wales's Light Horse
- Australia – Australian Army Reserve – 12th/16th Hunter River Lancers

== See also ==
- Australian Light Horse
