= Zaytun Division =

2004–2008 South Korean army unit in Iraq

- 자이툰부대
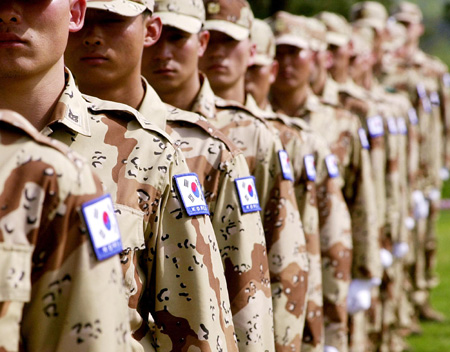
- South Korean soldiers in 2003
- Active: 2004–2008
- Country: South Korea
- Branch: Republic of Korea Army
- Type: Infantry
- Size: 8,000; 650–3,600 (rotation)
- Part of: Multi-National Force – Iraq
- Garrison/HQ: Erbil, Kurdistan Region
- Engagements: Iraq War

The Zaytun Division (Korean: 자이툰부대; Kurdish: Tîpa Zeytûnê) was a combined infantry unit of the Republic of Korea Army (ROKA) contingent operating in Republic of Iraq from September 2004 to December 2008, carrying out humanitarian aid, humanitarian intervention, peacekeeping, providing medical assistance to people in the area of responsibility, providing security for civilians affected by war in Erbil area, and other reconstruction-related tasks as South Korea's contribution to the Iraq War.

== Formation ==
South Korea dispatched a small contingent of 600 military medics and combat engineers (the 320th Medical Assistance 'Jerma' Unit and the 1100th Construction Engineer 'Seoheui' Unit) to predominantly Shia areas in Southern Iraq in April 2003. The United States government asked South Korea to send additional forces on September 4, 2003. Upon request, Seoul formed the Division 'Zaytun' (transcription of Arabic word زيتون, 'olive') which stressed the peace-keeping role of the troops. An additional 2,200 troops (mostly combat engineers) were deployed to Erbil in the Kurdistan Region of Northern Iraq by early September 2004 and were grouped with the humanitarian troops who were relocated from Southern Iraq. The combined unit consisted of 2,800 soldiers. Another 800 soldiers were dispatched to reinforce the existing troops in Arbil in November 2004, thus increasing the size of South Korea's contingent to 3,600.

== Order of battle ==
- 11th Reconstruction Brigade
  - 111th Reconstruction Battalion
  - 112th Reconstruction Battalion
- 12th Reconstruction Brigade
  - 121st Reconstruction Battalion
  - 122nd Reconstruction Battalion
- 320th Medical Assistance Unit 'Jerma'
- 1100th Construction Engineer Unit 'Seoheui'
- Republic of Korea Army Special Warfare Command (2 Battalions)
- Republic of Korea Army Commando (1 Battalion)
- Republic of Korea Marine Corps (1 Company)

== Timeline and background ==
Impassioned opposition to the deployment among both politicians and the public peaked during the captivity of South Korean Kim Sun-il, who was kidnapped on June 17, 2004, and after his execution on June 22, 2004. The incident occurred while the bulk of the Korean contingent was being prepared for its upcoming deployment and triggered a major public debate as to whether they should be sent, involving sometimes violent and vocally anti-American protests.

On October 10, 2004, a little-known Islamist group threatened South Korea in a video posted on an Arabic-language website, promising that they would "make Korea suffer" if its troops were not withdrawn within two weeks. The warning outlined how Korean troops would be attacked "one by one" and also that their families would be targeted in Korea itself. About a week beforehand, Ayman al-Zawahiri mentioned South Korea in a list of countries allied to the US that should be targeted by volunteers. Subsequently, Korean embassies were instructed by then Foreign Minister Ban Ki-moon to strengthen security.

Former U.S. Secretary of Defense, Donald Rumsfeld, traveled to Arbil to visit the South Korean troops on October 10, 2004. On his way home from a visit to Paris, President Roh Moo-hyun made a surprise visit to the Zaytun Division in Arbil on December 8. Throughout 2005, South Korea's was the third largest foreign military deployment in Iraq, behind the United Kingdom.

In early 2006, 1,300 troops were withdrawn following a December 2005 vote by the National Assembly (10-3 with one abstention). Another 1,200 troops were sent home in early 2007, and it was widely assumed that a complete pullout would take place by the beginning of 2008, when the deployment mandate was set to expire. However, on October 23, 2007, South Korean President Roh Moo-hyun announced that the mandate would be extended for another year, although the size of the contingent will be halved to 600. The decision to yet again renew the mandate came just several weeks away from December elections in South Korea, during which the extremely unpopular military deployment to Iraq was expected to become a significant issue.

In December 2007, South Korea had 933 personnel deployed; this number had fallen to 520 by October 2008. In a regular briefing on October 29, 2008, Won Tae-jae, a spokesman at the Ministry of Defense said, "The Zaytun army unit, stationed in the city of Arbil in northern Iraq, will begin pulling out of the country in early December, handing the mission over to U.S. troops, and will complete the withdrawal by around December 20, [2008]." A farewell ceremony for the remainder of the South Korean contingent was held on December 1, 2008.

== Other details ==
The main tasks of the South Korean contingent were to provide medical services and to build and repair roads, power lines, schools and other public infrastructure. The contingent included a small number of Muslim South Korean soldiers who converted to Islam just before their deployment. The Koreans suffered only one fatality: an officer who committed suicide on the South Korean base in May 2007. The only other deaths attributed to their presence have been accidents involving both South Korean and Iraqi civilians.

== See also ==
- Multinational force in Iraq
