= Al Muthanna Task Group =

- Australian soldiers supported by an ASLAV-25 patrol along a railway line near Camp Smitty during routine foot patrols in Al Muthanna Province
- Active: 2005–2006
- Country: Australia
- Branch: Australian Army
- Type: Battlegroup
- Size: ~450 personnel
- Engagements: Iraq War

The Al Muthanna Task Group (AMTG) was a battlegroup that formed Australia's main ground force contribution to the Multinational force in Iraq. The AMTG was established in April 2005 and ceased to exist in July 2006 when the Australian force was relocated to Dhi Qar Governorate as Overwatch Battle Group (West).

== Role ==
The Al Muthanna Task Group had two tasks:

1. Provide a secure environment for the Japanese Iraq Reconstruction and Support Group (JIRSG)
2. Assist in the training of local Iraqi Army units so that they are able to take over the internal and external defence of their country

== Composition ==
The AMTG was made up of around 450 personnel and consisted of:

- Task Group Headquarters
- a cavalry squadron
- an infantry company
- a training team (on 6-month deployments)
- supporting elements

=== Rotations ===
- AMTG-1: April – November 2005 (Lieutenant Colonel Roger Noble)
  - HQ, 2nd Cavalry Regiment
  - C Squadron, 2nd Cavalry Regiment
  - B Company, 5th/7th Battalion, Royal Australian Regiment
  - Support Squadron, 2nd Cavalry Regiment
- AMTG-2: November 2005 – June 2006 (Lieutenant Colonel Peter Short)
  - HQ, 5th/7th Battalion, Royal Australian Regiment
  - A Squadron, 2nd Cavalry Regiment
  - C Company, 5th/7th Battalion, Royal Australian Regiment
  - Operational Support Company, 5th/7th Battalion, Royal Australian Regiment
- AMTG-3: June – July 2006 (Lieutenant Colonel Michael Mahy)
  - HQ, 2nd Battalion, Royal Australian Regiment
  - A Squadron, 2nd/14th Light Horse Regiment (Queensland Mounted Infantry)
  - A Company, 2nd Battalion, Royal Australian Regiment
  - Support Company, 2nd Battalion, Royal Australian Regiment
  - IMV Detachment, 6th Battalion, Royal Australian Regiment

There were three rotations of troops into the AMTG. The initial force operated in Iraq between April and November 2005 and was commanded by the 2nd Cavalry Regiment's headquarters. The second rotation arrived in Iraq in November 2005 and was commanded by 5/7 RAR's headquarters. The final rotation arrived in May 2005 and was commanded by 2 RAR's headquarters.

The AMTG was highly mechanised and operated 40 Australian Light Armoured Vehicles (ASLAVs) and 10 Bushmasters. While the first two AMTG rotations were largely drawn from 1 Brigade, the third rotation was drawn from both 3 Brigade and 7 Brigade.

Members of the training teams were drawn from across the Australian Defence Force. Their ranks range from private to lieutenant colonel.

== Later operations ==
While the AMTG was initially only deployed for two 6-month rotations, the Australian government announced in March 2006 that the deployment would be extended until at least the second half of 2007. Upon the withdrawal of Japanese reconstruction troops the Australian force was transferred to Tallil Airbase in Dhi Qar Governorate. The role of the Task Group changed to providing support to Iraqi forces as requested. The Task Group was renamed the Overwatch Battle Group (West).
