= 2nd Cavalry Regiment (Australia) =

Australian Army unit

- Cap badge of the 2nd Cavalry Regiment
- Active: 1965 – present
- Country: Australia
- Branch: Army
- Type: Line cavalry
- Role: Armoured cavalry
- Size: One regiment
- Part of: 3rd Brigade
- Garrison/HQ: Townsville, Queensland
- Motto: Courage
- March: Quick – Garry Owen/The Girl I left Behind Me; Slow – Song of Joy
- Mascot: Australian wedge tailed eagle
- Anniversaries: 31 October – Beersheba Day; 20 November – Regimental birthday

Commanders
- Colonel-in-Chief: King Charles III (Colonel-in-Chief, RAAC)

Insignia
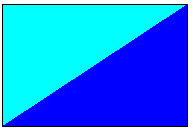
- Unit colour patch

The 2nd Cavalry Regiment (2 CAV) is an armoured cavalry regiment of the Australian Army. Formed in 1965 as the "1st Cavalry Regiment", it is the second most senior regiment in the Royal Australian Armoured Corps. In 1970, the regiment was redesignated as the "2nd Cavalry Regiment", to differentiate it from the 1st Armoured Regiment. The regiment was based at Holsworthy until 1992 when it was allocated to the 1st Brigade based in Darwin in the Northern Territory. In late 2014 the regiment was transferred to the 3rd Brigade, and is now based in Townsville in Queensland. The unit is equipped with M1A2 SEPv3 tanks, ASLAV light armoured vehicles and M113AS4 APCs.

== History ==
The regiment was formed in 1965 as the 1st Cavalry Regiment through the regimentation of two regular squadrons that had formed part of Citizens Military Force regiments. A Squadron was formed from A Squadron, 4th/19th Prince of Wales's Light Horse, while B Squadron was formed from A Squadron, 2nd/14th Queensland Mounted Infantry.

An ASLAV from 2nd Cavalry Regiment with Australian soldiers in East Timor in 1999.

These two squadrons initially had no Regimental Headquarters or Headquarters Squadron. However, with reorganisation of the RAAC came both an RHQ and a new name. RHQ and Headquarters Squadron formed at Gallipoli Lines, Holsworthy on 20 November 1970. In order to avoid confusion, it was decided that the armoured regiments of the regular army would be numbered sequentially; 1st Armoured Regiment was the most senior, so 1st Cavalry was renamed 2nd Cavalry Regiment. When first formed, the regiment consisted of a reconnaissance squadron and an armoured personnel carrier squadron. This continued until 1976, when the Royal Australian Regiment took on a mechanised role, leaving 2nd Cavalry Regiment to concentrate on the reconnaissance role. In 1992, the 2nd Cavalry Regiment moved from Holsworthy to Darwin in the Northern Territory, being the first unit of the 1st Brigade to do so.

By 1996, 'C' Squadron was raised. All three squadrons were equipped with the M113 vehicle in the reconnaissance role until the mid-1990s, with the regiment being re-equipped with the Australian Light Armoured Vehicle (ASLAV) between 1995 and 1997. Among the specialised equipment used in reconnaissance by the regiment is the Australian Man-portable Surveillance and Target Acquisition Radar (AMSTAR) system which is able to detect and recognise moving targets including personnel, vehicles, watercraft and low flying helicopters. AMSTAR has a target detection and classification capability at ranges up to 35,000 metres. Although the system can be moved by a few personnel it is commonly mounted on the ASLAV-Ss. A ruggedised laptop is used for data processing in conjunction with an aural indicator.

Since being re-equipped with the ASLAV the 2nd Cavalry Regiment has played a key role in Australian military operations. In 1999, 'C' Squadron deployed to East Timor as part of the initial Australian contribution to INTERFET, with the ASLAVs providing the Australian force with the majority of its mobility and armoured support during the early days of the intervention. Detachments from the regiment supported all subsequent Australian troop deployments to East Timor. The regiment continued to serve in East Timor as part of the UNTAET from 2000 to 2002.

The 2nd Cavalry Regiment made deployments to Iraq in the aftermath of the 2003 invasion. The regiment's initial role was to provide armoured transport for Australian diplomats and military personnel based in Baghdad and northern Iraq. The regiment also formed a key element of the Al Muthanna Task Group from 2005, with the Regimental Headquarters under Lieutenant Colonel Roger Noble commanding the initial rotation and a squadron from the regiment forming part of the first two rotations of Task Group elements from 2005 to 2006. The 2nd Cavalry Regiment subsequently led Overwatch Battle Group (West) Two and supported the third rotation of the Battle Group from 2006 to 2007. Meanwhile, it also supported the Security Detachment (SECDET) in Baghdad between 2003–2005, 2007–2009 and 2011. The regiment deployed to Afghanistan with Reconstruction Task Force One from 2006 to 2007, the first and second rotations of the Mentoring and Reconstruction Task Force from 2008 to 2010, and Mentoring Task Force Two between 2010 and 2011. In 2013 the unit formed the 2nd Cavalry Regiment Task Force which was the final rotation of the Australian deployment to Uruzgan province, Afghanistan.

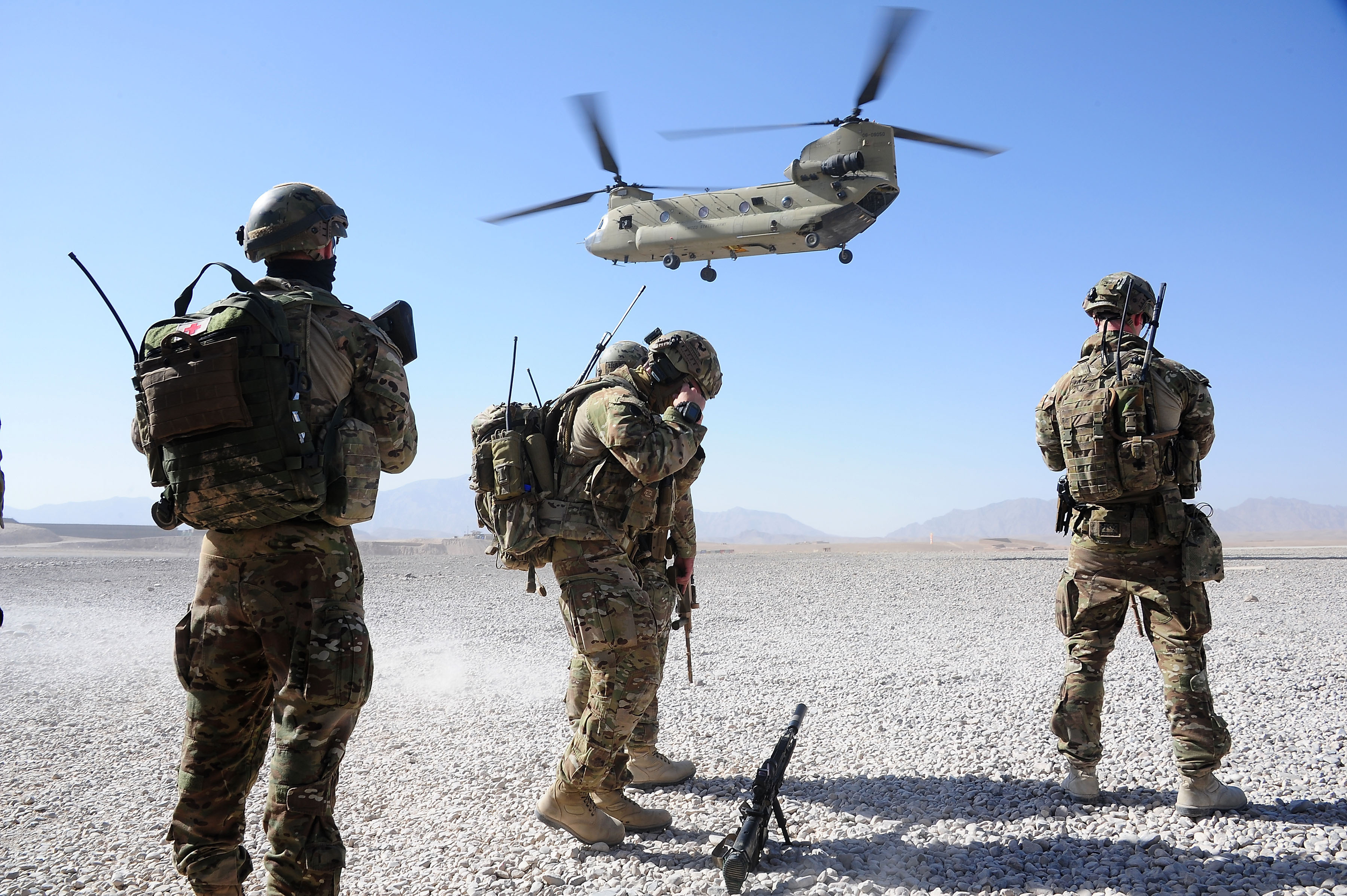
Soldiers from the 2nd Cavalry Regiment prepare to board a US Army helicopter in Afghanistan during 2013

Commencing in 2014, the 2nd Cavalry Regiment began re-locating to Lavarack Barracks in Townsville, Queensland to become the armoured component of the 3rd Brigade. On 31 October, the regiment farewelled Darwin, and on 28 November 2014 it conducted a parade in Townsville to mark its transfer to the 3rd Brigade. Under Plan Beersheba the 2nd Cavalry Regiment has become one of three Armoured Cavalry Regiments assigned to the Army's multirole combat brigades located in Brisbane, Darwin and Townsville. The regiment is equipped with M1A1 tanks and ASLAV light armoured vehicles.

== Current composition ==
As of 2024, the regiment was made up of:

- Regimental Headquarters (RHQ)
- A Squadron – Cavalry (equipped with the ASLAV)
- B Squadron – Cavalry (equipped with the ASLAV)
- C Squadron – Tank (equipped with the M1A2 SepV3)
- D Squadron – Tank (equipped with the M1A2 SepV3)
- Support Squadron.

== Traditions ==
=== Regimental badge ===
The regiment's badge is an Australian wedge-tailed eagle swooping, with a lance and a banner bearing the word "courage" in its talons. This came about soon after the regiment's formation, when a competition was held to design an appropriate badge. A bird-of-prey was decided upon due to the regiment's reconnaissance role. The wedge tailed eagle was chosen due to its "keenness of sight and ability to roam over large distances". The badge was awarded in 1967.

=== Guidon ===
The regiment's first Guidon was presented in 1972, when 'A' Sqn, 3 Cav Regt was transferred to 2 Cav Regt. This was lost when the Officers Mess was destroyed by fire in 1990. A new Guidon was presented the same year.

=== Mascot ===
The regiment's mascot is a wedge-tailed eagle named "Courage". Since its formation, there have been two:

- Courage I: Trooper Courage was presented to the regiment as a six-week-old eaglet in 1967, and participated in virtually every regimental ceremony from 1969 onwards, including taking part in the House Guard for The Queen in 1974. Courage rose to the rank of Sergeant before she died in 1987.
- Courage II: A new mascot, again named Courage, was presented to the regiment in 1987. His first major ceremonial occasion was as part of the guard for The Prince of Wales during his visit to Australia in 1988 for the bicentennial celebrations. In 1997, while on flight training with his handlers, Corporal Courage refused to cooperate and flew away, not being found for two days following an extensive search. He was charged with being AWL and reduced to the rank of Trooper. He was promoted back to Corporal in 1998. Courage rose to the rank of Warrant Officer Class Two before dying on 16 October 2017.

== Battle honours ==
The 2nd Cavalry Regiment is the custodian of the battle honours awarded to the 2/6th Cavalry (Commando) Regiment for its service during World War II, although these honours are not displayed on the regiment's Guidon.

- North Africa 1940–41, Bardia 1941, Capture of Tobruk, Cerna Giaabub, Syria 1941, Meejayun, Adlum, Sidon, Darmour, South West Pacific 1944–45, Liberation of Australian New Guinea, Abau-Malin, Anub River, Maprik, Wewak, Wirui Mission.

== Alliances ==
- United States – 2nd Stryker Cavalry Regiment (Bond of Friendship).
