= Overwatch Battle Group (West) =

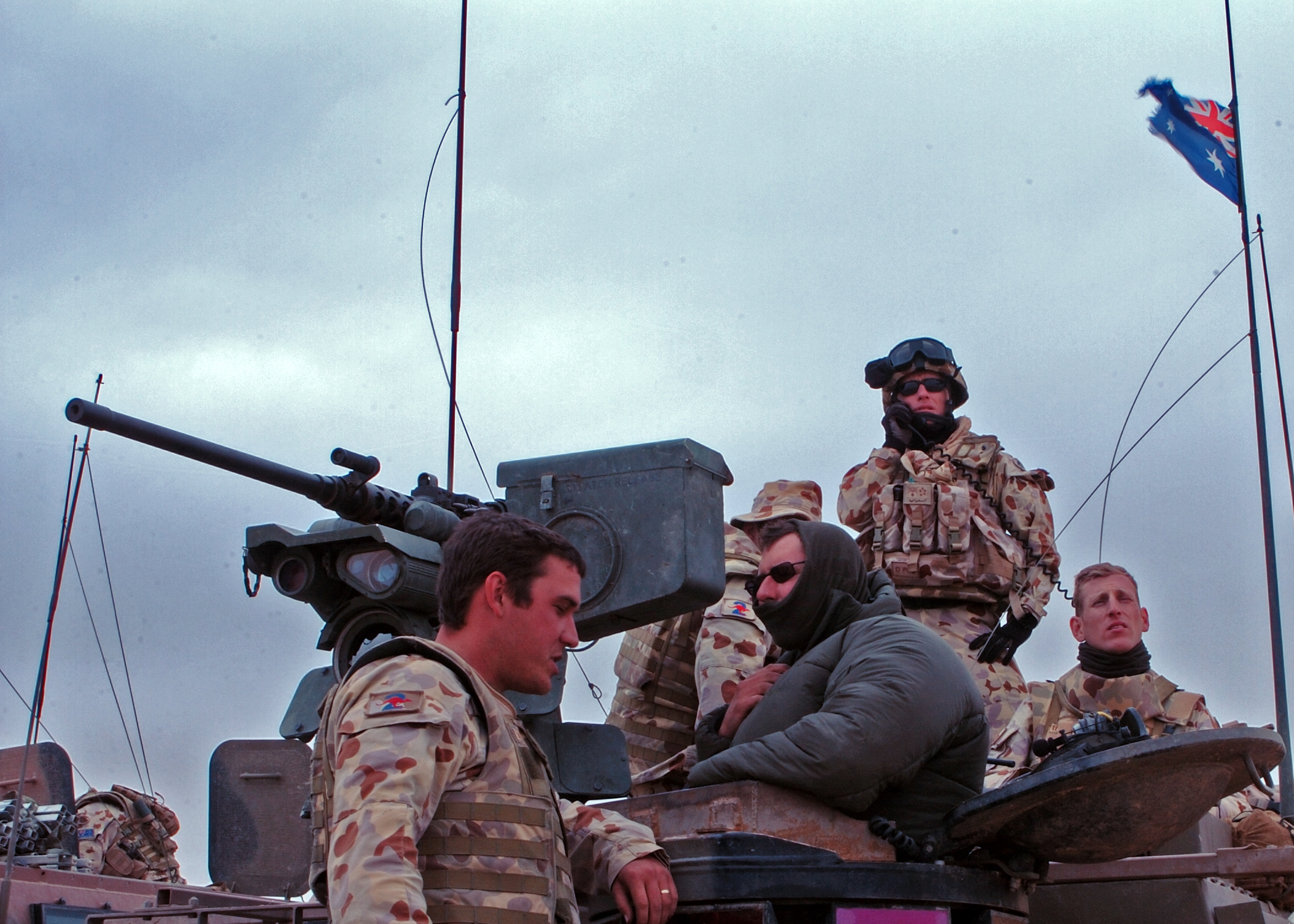
- Overwatch Battle Group (West) personnel in April 2007
- Active: 2006–2008
- Country: Australia
- Branch: Australian Army
- Type: Battlegroup
- Size: Over 500 personnel
- Headquarters: Tallil Air Base
- Engagements: Iraq War: Battle of Al Rumaythah; Battle of Route Bismarck

Overwatch Battle Group (West) was an Australian Army battlegroup that represented Australia's largest contribution to the Multinational force in Iraq. The Battle Group was established in July 2006 and was based at Tallil Airbase in Dhi Qar Governorate, consisting of units previously assigned to the third, and final, rotation of the Al Muthanna Task Group. It was withdrawn in June 2008.

== History ==
Upon its formation Overwatch Battle Group (West) consisted of units which were previously assigned to the third, and final, rotation of the Al Muthanna Task Group, following the handover of Camp Smitty to Iraqi Forces in July 2006. The Battle Group formed part of Multi-National Division (South-East). An additional 38 personnel and four Bushmaster protected mobility vehicles were deployed in late 2006 to increase the size of the force to over 500 soldiers supported by 40 ASLAVs and 19 Bushmasters. Total Australian strength in southern Iraq rose to over 500 personnel.

Overwatch Battle Group (West)'s main role was to provide support to Iraqi Security Forces in a crisis if requested by the Iraqi Government and the Multi-National Force – Iraq. Whilst it was never called upon to act in this role, the Battle Group did conduct combat and security operations within the cities of An Nasiriyah and As Samawah, the provincial capitals of Dhi Qar and Al Muthana respectively, extensive patrolling within rural areas and on Main Supply Routes (MSRs) to counter the indirect fire and improvised explosive device threat, training and mentoring of the Iraqi Army and Police, support to strike operations undertaken by United States Special Forces, and construction and re-construction work. The Battle Group's training team was responsible for providing basic training to Iraqi Army personnel at the Basic Training Centre in Tallil.

During the four rotations of the deployment, the battle group took part in a number of engagements, including the Battle of Al Rumaythah, which occurred on 26 September 2006 and involved OBG(W) 1, and the Battle of Route Bismarck, involving OBG(W) 2 over the period 23–24 April 2007. As the Labor Party led by Kevin Rudd pledged in the 2007 election, Australian combat forces began withdrawing from Iraq on 1 June 2008. and the Overwatch Battle Group (West) and Australian Army Training Team formally ceased combat operations on the 2 June 2008. No Australian military personnel were killed in the course of the deployment, during which the Australian contingent helped train 33,000 Iraqi soldiers. Approximately 200 Australian personnel remained in Iraq on logistical and air surveillance duties after its withdrawal.

== Rotations ==
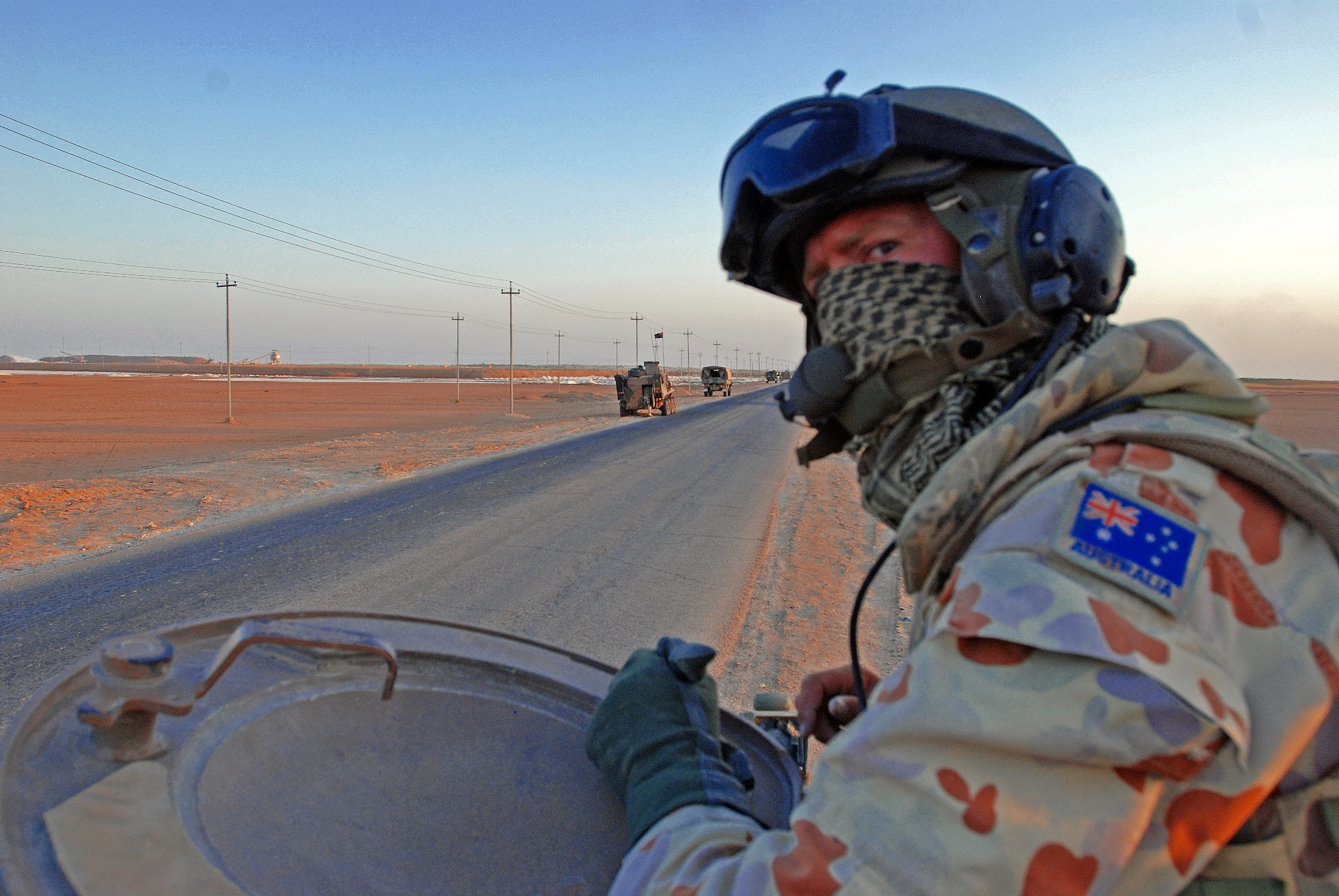
An Australian cavalry scout in Iraq during October 2007

- OBG(W)-1: June – December 2006 (Lieutenant Colonel Mick Mahy)
  - HQ, 2nd Battalion, Royal Australian Regiment
  - A Squadron, 2nd/14th Light Horse Regiment (Queensland Mounted Infantry)
  - A Company, 2nd Battalion, Royal Australian Regiment
  - Support Company, 2nd Battalion, Royal Australian Regiment
  - IMV Detachment, 6th Battalion, Royal Australian Regiment
- OBG(W)-2: December 2006 – June 2007 (Lieutenant Colonel Tony Rawlins)
  - HQ, 2nd Cavalry Regiment
  - B Squadron/Combat Team Eagle, 2nd Cavalry Regiment
  - D Company/Combat Team Tiger, 5th/7th Battalion, Royal Australian Regiment
  - Combat Service Support Team
- OBG(W)-3: May – December 2007 (Lieutenant Colonel Jake Ellwood)
  - HQ, 5th Battalion, Royal Australian Regiment
  - A Squadron, 2nd Cavalry Regiment
  - 2 Troop, B Squadron, 3rd/4th Cavalry Regiment.
  - C Company, 5th Battalion, Royal Australian Regiment
  - Combat Support Element
  - Combat Service Support Element
- OBG(W)-4: November 2007 – June 2008 (Lieutenant Colonel Chris Websdane)
  - HQ, 2nd/14th Light Horse Regiment (Queensland Mounted Infantry)
  - A Squadron, 2nd/14th Light Horse Regiment (Queensland Mounted Infantry)
  - A Company, 6th Battalion, Royal Australian Regiment
  - Combat Support Element
  - Combat Service Support Element
