= List of Australian Army generals =

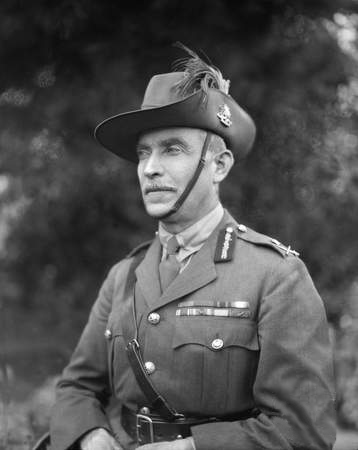
Sir Harry Chauvel, the first Australian officer to attain the rank of lieutenant general (1917) and general (1929)

The following is a list of Australians who have attained general officer rank in the Australian Army; that is, officers who have held the rank of field marshal (five-star rank), general (four-star rank), lieutenant general (three-star rank), major general (two-star rank) or brigadier general (one-star rank). The Commonwealth Military Forces were established on 1 March 1901, following the Federation of Australia, as Australia's ground forces. The service was reorganised and re-titled as the Australian Military Forces in 1916 and then to the Australian Army in 1980. Major Downes, commandant of the military forces in Victoria in 1901 and a retired British Army major general, saw his British Army rank reciprocated in the Commonwealth Military Forces; he thus became the first person to attain general officer rank in the Australian forces.

The number of general officers swelled during the First World War, as Australia committed five infantry and the core of two mounted divisions to the war effort. In 1917, on assuming command of the Desert Column, Sir Harry Chauvel became simultaneously the first Australian to command a corps and the first to be promoted to lieutenant general. Chauvel was made Chief of the General Staff, the professional head of the Australian Military Forces, post-war and—alongside Sir John Monash—was in 1929 the first officer to be promoted to full general. The Australian Military Forces again mushroomed during the Second World War, peaking at eleven infantry and three armoured divisions. In recognition of his service as Commander-in-Chief of the Australian Military Forces during the war, Sir Thomas Blamey was promoted to field marshal in 1950. He remains the only non-royal to attain the substantive rank of field marshal in the Australian Army. A further twelve officers have achieved the rank of general, 47 lieutenant general, and at least 269 major general, while a further 31 achieved brigadier general before the rank was abolished and replaced by the senior officer (non-general) rank of brigadier in the 1920s. Eleven officers have additionally retired with the honorary rank of lieutenant general, and 29 as honorary major generals.

== Field marshals ==
Australian field marshal's rank insignia

This along with the + (plus) indicates that the officer was granted the honorary rank of field marshal in the Australian Army.

Name	Born	Died	Date promoted	Senior command(s) or appointment(s) in rank	Notes
William Birdwood, 1st Baron Birdwood+	1865	1951	20 March 1925	(Note: Birdwood, an officer of the British Indian Army, had been General Officer Commanding Australian Imperial Force (1915–19) during the First World War. He was granted the honorary rank of field marshal in the Australian Military Forces when promoted to field marshal in the British Army in 1925.)	
Sir Thomas Blamey	1884	1951	8 June 1950	Commander-in-Chief of the Australian Military Forces and Commander of Allied Land Forces, South West Pacific Area (1942–45)	
Charles III+	1948	—	19 October 2024	King of Australia (2022–)	
George VI	1895	1952	2 June 1938	King of the United Kingdom and the Dominions of the British Commonwealth (1936–52)	
Prince Philip, Duke of Edinburgh	1921	2021	1 April 1954	Prince Consort of Elizabeth II (1947–2021)	

== Generals ==
Australian general's rank insignia

A dash (—) in the "Died" column indicates that the person is still living.

This along with the * (asterisk) indicates that the general is still a serving member of the Australian Army.

The rank of general is the most senior active rank in the Australian Army. Only the five-star rank of field marshal is higher, but it is reserved for exceptional circumstances and only Sir Thomas Blamey (1950) has attained the rank in a non-ceremonial capacity. There are currently no appointments in the Australian Defence Force (ADF) at the five-star level. With the current structure of the ADF, the rank of general is held only when an officer of the Australian Army is appointed as Chief of the Defence Force.

Generals of the Australian Army are as follows:

Name	Born	Died	Date promoted	Senior command(s) or appointment(s) in rank	Notes
John Baker	1936	2007	1995	Chief of the Defence Force (1995–98)	
Sir Phillip Bennett	1928	2023	13 April 1984	Chief of the Defence Force (1984–87)	
Angus Campbell		—	July 2018	Chief of the Defence Force (2018–24)	
Sir Harry Chauvel	1865	1945	11 November 1929	Inspector-in-Chief Volunteer Defence Corps (1940–45), Chief of General Staff (1923–30)	
Sir Peter Cosgrove	1947	—	2002	Chief of the Defence Force (2002–05)	
Peter Gration	1932	—	1987	Chief of the Defence Force (1987–93)	
Sir Frank Hassett	1918	2008	24 November 1975	Chief of the Defence Force Staff (1976–77), Chairman, Chiefs of Staff Committee (1975–76)	
David Hurley	1953	—	2011	Chief of the Defence Force (2011–14)	
Sir Arthur MacDonald	1919	1995	21 April 1977	Chief of the Defence Force Staff (1977–79)	
Sir John Monash	1865	1931	11 November 1929	(Note: Monash, who had served as General Officer Commanding Australian Corps (1918) and Director General of Repatriation (1918–19) during the First World War, had retired in 1920 and was promoted on the Unattached List.)	
Sir Brudenell White	1876	1940	18 March 1940	Chief of the General Staff (1920–23, 1940)	
Sir John Wilton	1910	1981	1 September 1968	Chairman, Chiefs of Staff Committee (1966–70)	

== Lieutenant generals ==
Australian lieutenant general's rank insignia

A dash (—) in the "Died" column indicates that the person is still living.

This along with the * (asterisk) indicates that the lieutenant general is still a serving member of the Australian Army.
This along with the + (plus sign) indicates that the officer retired with the honorary rank of lieutenant general.

Lieutenant general is the highest permanent rank in the Australian Army. The rank of lieutenant general is always held by the Chief of Army, though is also held when an Australian Army officer is appointed as Vice Chief of the Defence Force, Chief of Joint Operations, Chief of Joint Capabilities, Chief of Defence Intelligence, Chief of Personnel or an equivalent position.

Lieutenant generals of the Australian Army are as follows:

Name	Born	Died	Date promoted	Senior command(s) or appointment(s) in rank	Notes
Gordon Bennett	1887	1962	1 September 1942	III Corps (1942–44)	
Sir Frank Berryman	1894	1981	1 October 1948	Eastern Command (1946–53), I Corps (1944), II Corps (1943–44)	
Rudolph Bierwirth	1899	1993	13 October 1954	British Commonwealth Forces Korea (1954–56)	
Greg Bilton	1965	—	June 2019	Chief of Joint Operations (2019–2024)	
Allan Boase+	1894	1964	20 February 1951	Southern Command (1949–51)	
Sir William Bridgeford+	1894	1971	14 March 1953	British Commonwealth Forces Korea (1951–53), Eastern Command (1951)	
Sir Mervyn Brogan	1915	1994	19 May 1971	Chief of the General Staff (1971–73)	
Richard Burr	1964	—	2018	Chief of Army (2018–22)	
John Caligari	1960	—	2014	Chief Capability Development Group (2014–15)	
Cyril Clowes+	1892	1968	1 June 1949		
John Coates	1932	2018	1990	Chief of the General Staff (1990–92)	
Susan Coyle*	1970	—	2024	Chief of Army (2026–), Chief of Joint Capabilities (2024–26)	
Sir Thomas Daly	1913	2004	19 May 1966	Chief of the General Staff (1966–71)	
Sir Donald Dunstan	1923	2011	21 April 1977	Chief of the General Staff (1977–82)	
Hector Edgar	1903	1978	23 March 1958	Eastern Command (1960–63), Southern Command (1958–60)	
Mark Evans	1953	—	2008	Chief of Joint Operations (2008–11)	
Natasha Fox*		—	5 June 2023	Chief of Personnel (2023–)	
John Frewen		—	2018	Chief of Joint Capabilities (2021–2024), National COVID Vaccine Taskforce (2021–22), Principal Deputy Director Australian Signals Directorate (2018–21)	
Sir Ragnar Garrett	1900	1977	16 December 1954	Chief of the General Staff (1958–60), Southern Command (1954–58)	
Ken Gillespie	1952	—	2005	Chief of Army (2008–11), Vice Chief of the Defence Force (2005–08)	
John Grey	1939	—	1992	Chief of the General Staff (1992–95)	
Sir Edmund Herring	1892	1982	1 September 1942	I Corps (1942–44), New Guinea Force (1942–43), II Corps (1942)	
Frank Hickling	1941	—	1998	Chief of Army (1998–2000)	
Sir Talbot Hobbs+	1864	1938	24 August 1927		
Sir Carl Jess	1884	1948	1 September 1942	Chairman of the Manpower Committee (1939–44)	
Sir John Lavarack	1885	1957	13 October 1939 / 18 June 1941 (Note: Lavarack accepted a demotion to major general in 1940 to assume command of the 7th Division.)	First Army (1942–44), I Corps (1941–42), Southern Command (1939–40)	
Peter Leahy	1952	—	2002	Chief of Army (2002–08)	
George Lee+	1860	1939	13 May 1920		
James Gordon Legge+	1863	1947	14 January 1924		
Sir Iven Mackay	1882	1966	1 September 1941	New Guinea Force (1943–44), Second Army (1942–44), Home Forces (1941–42)	
Sir James McCay+	1864	1930	21 December 1926		
Michelle McGuinness*		—	2024	National Cyber Security Coordinator (2024–)	
Charles Miles	1884	1958	1 September 1942	Eastern Command (1940–41)	
David Morrison	1956	—	2011	Chief of Army (2011–15)	
Sir Leslie Morshead	1889	1959	1 September 1942	I Corps (1944–45), Second Army (1944), New Guinea Force (1944), II Corps (1943)	
Desmond Mueller	1943	—	2000	Vice Chief of the Defence Force (2000–02)	
Robert Nimmo+	1893	1966	15 November 1954	United Nations Military Observer Group in India and Pakistan (1952–66)	
Sir John Northcott	1890	1966	6 April 1942	British Commonwealth Occupation Force (1946), Chief of the General Staff (1940, 1942–45)	
Lawrence O'Donnell	1933	2026	1987	Chief of the General Staff (1987–90)	
John William Parnell+	1860	1931	1 June 1920		
Cheryl Pearce		—	2025	UN Military Adviser for Peacekeeping Operations (2024–26)	
Sir Reginald Pollard	1903	1978	1 August 1957	Chief of the General Staff (1960–63), Eastern Command (1957–60)	
Ash Power	1957	—	18 May 2011	Chief of Joint Operations (2011–14)	
Gavan Reynolds		—	2020	Chief of Defence Intelligence (2020–2024)	
Sir Horace Robertson	1894	1960	1 October 1948	Southern Command (1953–54), British Commonwealth Forces Korea (1951), British Commonwealth Occupation Force (1946–51), First Army (1945–46)	
Sir Sydney Rowell	1894	1975	1 October 1948 (Note: Rowell was promoted to temporary lieutenant general on assuming command of I Corps in April 1942, but was dismissed from the command in September and subsequently reverted to major general. He was restored to temporary lieutenant general in 1946 on appointment as Vice Chief of the General Staff; his rank was made substantive on 1 October 1948.)	Chief of the General Staff (1950–54), Vice Chief of the General Staff (1946–50), I Corps (1942)	
John Sanderson	1940	—	1992	Chief of Army (1995–98), (Note: Sanderson was Chief of the General Staff until the position was re-titled as Chief of Army in February 1997.) Commander Joint Forces Australia (1993–95), Commander United Nations Transitional Authority in Cambodia (1992–93)	
Sir Stanley Savige	1890	1954	10 February 1944	II Corps (1944–45), New Guinea Force (1944), I Corps (1944)	
Victor Secombe+	1897	1962	4 April 1954	Northern Command (1952–54), Eastern Command (1951–52)	
Edward Smart	1891	1961	24 October 1940	Southern Command (1940–42)	
Ernest Squires	1882	1940	30 June 1938	Chief of the General Staff (1939–40), Inspector General of the Australian Army (1938–39)	
Simon Stuart		—	2022	Chief of Army (2022–26)	
Sir Vernon Sturdee	1890	1966	13 October 1939	Chief of the General Staff (1940–42, 1946–50), First Army (1944–45)	
Sir Henry Wells	1898	1973	12 April 1954 (Note: Wells was promoted to temporary lieutenant general on 20 February 1951; his rank was made substantive on 12 April 1954.)	Chairman, Chiefs of Staff Committee (1958–59), Chief of the General Staff (1954–58), British Commonwealth Forces Korea (1953–54), Southern Command (1951–53)	
John Whitham+	1881	1952	4 April 1946 (Note: Whitham was promoted to temporary lieutenant general on 2 May 1940 on being appointed General Officer Commanding Southern Command. He was placed on the Retired List in 1941 and, on 4 April 1946, was granted the honorary rank of lieutenant general.)	Southern Command (1940)	
Scott Winter*		—	2026	Deputy Commander, United Nations Command (2026–)	
Sir Eric Woodward	1899	1967	30 October 1954	Eastern Command (1953–57)	
Henry Wynter	1886	1945	6 April 1942	Lieutenant General Administration at Allied Land Headquarters (1942–44), Eastern Command (1941–42)	

== Major generals ==
Australian major general's rank insignia

A dash (—) in the "Died" column indicates that the person is still living.

This along with the * (asterisk) indicates that the major general is still a serving member of the Australian Army.
This along with the + (plus sign) indicates that the officer retired with the honorary rank of major general.

Name	Born	Died	Date promoted	Senior command(s) or appointment(s) in rank	Notes
Peter Abigail	1948	—	December 1996	Land Commander Australia (2000–02), Deputy Chief of Army (1998–00), Head Strategic Policy and Plans (1996–98)	
Paul Alexander		—	25 March 2008	Commander Joint Health and Surgeon General of the Australian Defence Force (2008–11)	
Arthur Allen	1894	1959	14 August 1941	Northern Territory Force (1943–44), 7th Division (1941–42)	
John Andersen	1912	1967	1 December 1963	Adjutant-General (1966–67), 1st Division (1963–66)	
Warren Anderson	1894	1973	1 June 1949 (Note: Anderson was promoted to temporary major general on 1 October 1948; his rank was made substantive from 1 June 1949.)	Adjutant-General (1947–51)	
John Antill+	1866	1937	26 January 1924		
Peter Arnison	1940	—	1991	Land Commander Australia (1994–96), 1st Division (1991–94)	
Mark Ascough*		—	2025	Head of Intelligence Assessments (2025–)	
Donald Baldwin	1924	1994	21 April 1977	Chief of Personnel – Army (1977–81)	
George Barber	1968	1951	9 March 1927 (Note: Barber was promoted to temporary major general on 9 May 1925; his rank was made substantive from 9 March 1927.)	Director-General of Medical Services (1925–34)	
Lindley Barham	1900	1995	25 May 1954	Adjutant-General (1954–57), Deputy Chief of the General Staff (1953–54)	
Jim Barry	1932	—	1985	3rd Division (1985–87)	
Leslie Beavis	1895	1975	1 September 1942	Chairman of the New Weapons and Equipment Development Committee (1946–52), Master-General of the Ordnance (1942–46)	
Donald Begg	1924	2021	19 April 1974	Logistics Command (1974–76)	
Jason Blain*		—	2022	Head Land Systems (2023–), Head Armoured Vehicle Division (2022–23)	
David Blake	1887	1965	1 September 1942	Northern Territory Lines of Communication Area (1942)	
Murray Blake	1939	—	December 1986	Land Commander Australia (1990–94), Royal Military College, Duntroon (1987–90)	
Andrew Bottrell		—	2015	Head Land Systems Division (2018–23), Commander Joint Agency Task Force Operation Sovereign Borders (2015–17)	
Mark Bradbury	1922	1994	29 April 1974 (Note: Bradbury was promoted to temporary major general on 19 November 1973; his rank was made substantive from 29 April 1974.)	Deputy Chief of the General Staff (1975–77), Chief of Materiel (1974–75), Chief of Operations (1973–74)	
Charles Brand+	1873	1961	5 September 1933		
Paul Brereton	1957	—	December 2010	Cadet, Reserve and Employer Support Division (2010–14)	
William Bridges	1861	1915	15 August 1914	General Officer Commanding Australian Imperial Force (1914–15), 1st Division (1914–15)	
John Broadbent	1914	2006	1 December 1963	2nd Division (1965–66), Communication Zone (1963–65)	
Kurt Brown*		—	2026	Head Land Capability (2026–)	
Reginald Spencer Browne+	1856	1943	20 October 1921		
Julius Bruche	1873	1961	1 October 1923	Chief of the General Staff (1931–35), Royal Military College, Duntroon (1931), Adjutant-General (1927–29), 1st Military District (1920–25)	
Ross Buchan	1935	2003	1987	Training Command (1987–91)	
Matt Burr*		—	2024	2nd Division (2024–)	
James Burston+	1856	1920	January 1920		
Roy Burston	1888	1960	16 February 1941	Director General of Medical Services (1942–48)	
Rolland Busch	1920	1985	1968	Chaplain-General (Uniting Church) (1979–81), Chaplain-General (Presbyterian) (1968–79)	
David Butler	1928	2020	1982	Training Command (1982–84)	
Cecil Callaghan	1890	1967	1 September 1942	AIF in Malaya (1942), 8th Division (1942)	
Ian Ross Campbell	1900	1997	13 September 1954	Royal Military College, Duntroon (1954–57)	
Kathryn Campbell		—	2018	2nd Division (2018–21)	
Lawrence Canet	1910	1996	25 April 1957	Southern Command (1960–64), Master-General of the Ordnance (1957–60, 1964–65)	
James Cannan	1882	1976	1 September 1942	Quartermaster General (1940–45), 2nd Division (1940)	
John Cantwell	1956	—	4 December 2006	Joint Task Force 633 (2010–11), Chief of Operations, Victorian Bushfire Reconstruction and Recovery Authority (2009), Deputy Chief of Army (2007–08)	
Timothy Cape	1915	2003	24 February 1966 (Note: Cape was promoted to temporary major general on 1 February 1965; his rank was made substantive from 24 February 1966.)	Chief of Materiel (1972), Master-General of the Ordnance (1968–72), Northern Command (1965–68)	
Geoffrey Carter	1941	2001	1992	Deputy Chief of the General Staff (1992–95)	
Shane Caughey	1962	—	2013	Director of Operations, United States Central Command (2016–18), Deputy Chief of Joint Operations (2013–15)	
Grant Cavenagh		—	2007	Commander Joint Logistics (2010–13), Head Land Systems (2007–10)	
Dave Chalmers	1958	—	28 June 2006	Northern Territory Emergency Response Taskforce (2007–09), Head Information Capability Management Division (2006–07)	
John Chapman	1896	1963	1 September 1942	Quartermaster General (1951–53), Central Command (1950–51), Army Representative on the Australian Military Mission, Washington (1946–50), Deputy Chief of the General Staff (1944–46), Deputy-Adjutant and Quartermaster General (1942–44)	
Michael Clifford	1956	2017	2005	Head of Information Capability Management (2005–06)	
Adrian Clunies-Ross	1933	—	26 March 1982	Chief of Operations (1985–88), 1st Division (1984–85), Head of Australian Defence Staff in London (1982–84)	
Andrew Clyne	1907	1994	6 April 1961 (Note: Clyne was promoted to temporary major general on 1 September 1960; his rank was made substantive from 6 April 1961.)	Director-General of Medical Services (1960–67)	
Ash Collingburn*		—	2023	1st Division (2023–)	
Jim Connolly	1944	—	1995	Commander Australian Theatre (1997–99), Director Defence Intelligence Organisation (1995–96)	
Kevin Cooke	1931	—	1980	Chief of the Army Reserve (1985–88), 3rd Division (1981–85)	
Elizabeth Cosson	1958	—	November 2007	Head Defence Support Operations (2007–10)	
David Coghlan	1963	—	September 2013	Head Armoured Vehicle Division (2019–22), Head Land Systems (2015–19), Senior Plans Officer, Headquarters International Security Assistance Force (2013–14)	
James Courtney+	1864	1947	1 January 1923		
Giles Cornelia*		—	2026	Deputy Commanding General - Strategy and Plans, United States Army Pacific (2026–)	
Michael Cowen*		—	2021	Judge Advocate General (2021–)	
Charles Cox+	1863	1944	1 March 1923		
Walter Coxen	1870	1949	7 March 1927	Chief of the General Staff (1930–31), Quartermaster General (1925–30)	
Michael Crane		—	February 2008	Joint Task Force 633 (2012–13), Special Projects Officer for the Chief of the Defence Force (2011–12), Deputy Director of Operations, United States Central Command (2009–10), Head Military Strategic Commitments (2008–10)	
Bill Crews	1944	—	1993	Director Defence Intelligence Organisation (1997–99), Assistant Chief Defence Force (Logistics), Assistant Chief of the General Staff – Material	
Paul Cullen	1909	2007	1 December 1961	Citizen Military Forces Member of the Military Board (1964–66), Communication Zone (1961–63)	
George Cuscaden+	1857	1933	30 June 1921		
Brian Dawson	1954	—	2010	Australian Military Representative to NATO and the European Union (2010–13)	
Peter Day	1935	2021	1984	Australian Defence Force Academy (1987–90), Deputy Chief of the General Staff (1985–86), Logistic Command (1984)	(Note: Major General Peter Day was the father of Major General Stephen Day.)
Stephen Day	1960	—	2012	Head of Cyber and Information Security, Australian Signals Directorate (2013–15), Chief of Plans, ISAF Joint Command (2012–13)	(Note: Major General Stephen Day is the son of Major General Peter Day.)
Derek Deighton	1930	1991	1982	Logistics Command (1985–87), Chief of Logistics – Army (1982–85)	
Craig Dobson*		—	2023	Head Military Workforce Design (2023–)	
Thomas Dodds	1873	1943	1 May 1930	Adjutant General (1929–34)	
Ivan Dougherty	1907	1998	1 July 1952	Citizen Military Forces Member of the Military Board (1954–57), 2nd Division (1952–54)	
Major Downes	1834	1923	1901 (Note: Downes was placed on the Retired List of the British Army in 1884 as an honorary major general. He subsequently served with the South Australian Military Forces, Victorian Military Forces and, following the Federation of Australia, the Australian Military Forces. He was placed on the Retired List of the Australian Military Forces with the rank of major general in 1902.)	Commandant of the Military Forces in Victoria (1899–1902)	(Note: Major General Major Downes was the father of Major General Rupert Downes.)
Rupert Downes	1885	1945	1 August 1935	Director of Medical Services, Second Army (1942–44), Inspector General of Medical Services (1941–42), Director-General of Medical Services (1934–41)	(Note: Major General Rupert Downes was the son of Major General Major Downes.)
David Drabsch	1931	2021	8 August 1980	1st Division (1981–84)	
Edmund Drake-Brockman	1884	1949	1 July 1937	3rd Division (1937–42)	
Kevin Duggan	1941	—	1996	Judge Advocate General (1996–01)	
Ana Duncan*		—	2023	Commander Forces Command (2025–), Commander Cyber Command (2023–25)	
Peter Dunn	1947	—	1996	Head of the Defence Personnel Executive (1997–00), Military Head of the Defence Efficiency Review Secretariat (1996–97)	
Francis Durham	1885	1957	1 September 1942 (Note: Durham was promoted to temporary major general on 2 May 1940. He was placed on the Regimental Supernumerary List with the temporary rank of major general on 21 September 1943 and, in 1947, was retrospectively promoted to the substantive rank of major general with seniority from 1 September 1942.)	1st Division (1942–43), 4th Division (1940–42)	
James Durrant	1885	1963	13 October 1939	Queensland Lines of Communication Area (1942–44), Northern Command (1941–42), Western Command (1939–41)	
Lewis Dyke	1900	1984	30 October 1954	Western Command (1954–57)	
William Eames+	1863	1956	1 August 1921		
Kenneth Eather	1901	1993	26 July 1945	11th Division (1945–46)	
Harold Elliott	1878	1931	24 August 1927	3rd Division (1927–31)	
Jake Ellwood	1970	—	2018	Queensland State Recovery Coordinator (2022), 1st Division (2018–21), Deputy Chief of Army (2018)	
David Engel	1927	2005	1 June 1976 (Note: Engel was promoted to temporary major general on 24 November 1975; his rank was made substantive from 1 June 1976.)	Deputy Chief of the General Staff (1982–83), Chief of Materiel – Army (1975–82)	
Peter Falkland	1925	1990	1 June 1976	Deputy Chief of the General Staff (1979–82), Head of Australian Defence Staff in Washington, D.C. (1976–79)	
Rodney Fay	1933	1998	1985	Assistant Chief of the General Staff – Army Reserve (1988–90), 2nd Division (1985–88)	
Richard Fetherston+	1864	1943	8 August 1921		
David Ferguson	1941	—	1994	Force Commander, Multinational Force and Observers (1994–97)	
Albert Fewtrell	1885	1950	1 September 1942	New South Wales Lines of Communication Area (1942–43), 1st Division (1940–41)	
Chris Field		—	20 November 2017	Assistant to the Chief of the Defence Force (2022–23), Deputy Commanding General – Operations, United States Army Central (2020–22), Commander Forces Command (2019–20), Vice Director of Operations and Plans, United States Central Command (2017–19)	
Adam Findlay		—	29 June 2017	Special Operations Command (2017–21)	
Charles Finlay	1910	1997	9 September 1957	Royal Military College, Duntroon (1962–68), Quartermaster-General (1957–62)	
Arthur Fittock	1939	—	9 September 1957	Head of Australian Defence Staff in Washington, D.C. (c. 1993–95), Deputy Chief of the General Staff (1992), 1st Division (1988–91)	
Gordon Fitzgerald	1934	2015	January 1984	Deputy Chief of the General Staff (1986–90), Chief of Personnel (1984–86)	
Ian Flawith		—	2006	2nd Division (2006–09)	
Gerard Fogarty		—	2011	Head People Capability (2011–14)	
Tim Ford	1945	—	1996	Chief Military Adviser, UN Department of Peacekeeping Operations (2000–02), Chief of Staff, United Nations Truce Supervision Organization (1998–00), 1st Division (1996–98)	
John Forsyth+	1867	1928	9 February 1925		
Duncan Francis	1937	2004	1985	Chief of Material (1985–91)	
Colin Fraser	1918	2001	1968	Logistic Command (1973–74), Southern Command (1971–73), Commander Australian Force Vietnam (1970–71), Royal Military College, Duntroon (1968–70)	
Tony Fraser	1958	—	25 August 2006	Head Helicopter Systems Division (2006–10)	
Andrew Freeman		—	2020	Head of Australian Defence Staff in Washington, D.C. (2020–23)	
Craig Furini		—	2018	Commander Joint Agency Task Force Operation Sovereign Borders (2018–20)	
Frederick Galleghan+	1897	1971	10 December 1948	Head of the Australian Military Mission to Germany (1948–49)	
Gregory Garde	1949	—	2001	Assistant Chief of the Defence Force (Reserves) and Head Reserve Policy (2001–04)	
Mick Garraway*		—	2024	Force Commander, Multinational Force and Observers (2024–)	
Sir John Gellibrand	1872	1945	30 June 1918	3rd Division (1918–22)	
Peter "Gus" Gilmore	1962	—	2010	Military Strategic Commitments Division (2016–19), Commander Forces Command (2015–16), Deputy Chief of Army (2013–15), Special Operations Command (2011–13)	
Sir William Glasgow	1876	1955	30 June 1918	4th Division (1921), 1st Division (1918–19)	
Warren Glenny	1935	2023	1990	2nd Division (1991–94), 3rd Division (1990–91)	
Ian Gordon	1952	—	2001	Chief of Staff, United Nations Truce Supervision Organization (2006–08), Deputy Chief of Army (2004–06), Training Command – Army (2002–04), Deputy Force Commander, United Nations Transitional Administration in East Timor (2001–02)	
Roy Gordon	1907	1996	1 December 1960	3rd Division (1960–63)	
Stephen Golding	1944	2022	March 1994	Chief of the Army Reserve (1994–98)	
Joseph Maria Gordon+	1856	1929	1921		
Garth Gould*		—	2024	Special Operations Command (2024–)	
Warren Gould*		—	2023	Head of Cyber Operations Division (2023–)	
Steve Gower	1940	—	1995	Training Command – Army (1995–96)	
Stuart Graham	1920	1996	1969	1st Division (1973–74), Northern Command (1972–73), Deputy Chief of the General Staff (1969–72)	
Suzanne Graham*		—	2022	Head Business Transformation (2022–)	
Kenneth Green	1917	1987	2 August 1971 (Note: Green was promoted to acting major general on 13 January 1970; his rank was made substantive from 2 August 1971.)	3rd Division (1970–73)	
Ron Grey	1930	2022	1978	Field Forces Command (1980–83), Chief of Operations – Army (1978–80)	
Harold Grimwade	1869	1949	1 July 1927	4th Division (1926–30)	
Colin Gurner	1919	2006	1 July 1967	Surgeon General Defence Force (1977–79), Joint Services Medical Advisor (1975–77), Director-General of Army Health Services (1974–75), Director-General of Medical Services (1967–74)	
Peter Haddad	1947	—	2002	Joint Logistics Command (c. 2003–05)	
David Hafner*	1974	—	2024	Aviation Command (2024–)	
Matthew Hall		—	December 2016	Australian Military Representative to NATO and the European Union (2022–24), Director Defence Intelligence Organisation (2016–21)	
Heathcote Hammer	1905	1961	2 July 1957 (Note: Hammer was promoted to acting major general on 2 July 1956; his rank was made substantive from 2 July 1957.)	3rd Division (1956–59)	
John Hardie+	1882	1956	20 March 1942		(Note: Hardie had been appointed to the local rank of major general on 1 July 1937 and, at this rank, served as Commandant, 2nd Military District (1935–39), Inspector General Department of Defence Co-ordination (1939–40) and Inspector of Administration, Army Headquarters (1940), before retiring with the honorary rank of major general on 20 March 1942.)
Hugh Harlock	1900	1981	3 May 1954	Northern Command (1954–57)	
James Harrison	1912	1971	2 September 1959 (Note: Hay was promoted to acting major general on 7 August 1957; his rank was made substantive from 2 September 1959.)	Eastern Command (1966–68), Adjutant-General (1963–66), Quartermaster-General (1962–63), Chairman, Joint Planning Committee (1960–62), Western Command (1957–59)	
John Hartley	1943	—	1991	Land Commander Australia (1998–00), Deputy Chief of Army (1995–98), Director Defence Intelligence Organisation (1992–95), Training Command (1991–92)	
Bob Hay	1920	1998	4 December 1968 (Note: Hay was promoted to acting major general on 28 August 1967; his rank was made substantive from 4 December 1968.)	Royal Military College, Duntroon (1973–77), 1st Division (1970), Australian Forces Vietnam (1969–70), Deputy Chief of the General Staff (1967–69)	
William Henderson	1919	1995	1 June 1973 (Note: Henderson was promoted to acting major general on 5 April 1971; his rank was made substantive from 1 June 1973.)	Training Command (1973–76), 1st Division (1971–73)	
Mike Hindmarsh	1956	—	2004	Training Command – Army (2009), Joint Task Force 633 (2008–09), Special Operations Command (2004–08)	
Sir John Hoad	1856	1911	1 January 1907	Chief of the General Staff (1909–11), Inspector-General of the Military Forces (1907–09)	
Andrew Hocking		—	2020	Project Lead – Afghanistan NEO Review (2022–23), Deputy Coordinator – Operations, National Recovery and Resilience Agency (2021–22), Deputy National Bushfire Recovery Coordinator (2020–21)	
Barry Hockney	1930	2024	3 August 1981	Royal Military College, Duntroon (1984–87), Chief of Personnel – Army (1981–84)	
Clifton Hoeben	1947	—	1997	2nd Division (1997–00)	
Shaun Hoffmann	—	—	2026	Head Land Systems (2026–)	
William Holmes	1862	1917	1 January 1917	4th Division (1917)	
Ronald Hopkins	1897	1990	21 September 1950	Royal Military College, Duntroon (1951–54)	
Brian Howard	1938	2024	1987	Director-General Natural Disasters Organisation (1987–89)	
Sir Neville Howse	1863	1930	1 January 1917 (Note: Howse was appointed to the temporary rank of surgeon general (equivalent to major general) on 22 November 1915; his rank was made substantive from 1 January 1917.)	Director General of Medical Services (1921–22), Director of AIF Medical Services (1915–20)	
Frederic Hughes+	1858	1944	1 March 1920		
James Curnow Hughes	1929	2016	19 June 1978	Controller of Establishments (1978–84)	(Note: Major General James Curnow Hughes was the younger brother of Major General Ronald Lawrence Hughes.)
Ronald Lawrence Hughes	1920	2003	15 June 1971 (Note: Hughes was promoted to temporary major general on 30 March 1971; his rank was made substantive from 15 June 1971.)	Chief of the Reserve (1975–77), 1st Division (1974–75), Director, Joint Staff (1971–74)	(Note: Major General Ronald Lawrence Hughes was the elder brother of Major General James Curnow Hughes.)
Godfrey Irving+	1867	1937	25 November 1925		
Robert Jackson	1886	1948	1 July 1940	Western Command (1941–42), 5th Military District (1941–42), Northern Command (1940–41), 1st Military District (1940–41)	(Note: Major General Robert Jackson was the father of Brigadier Donald Robert Jackson, Colonel Dawn Jackson and Brigadier Oliver David Jackson.)
William James	1930	2015	1 January 1982	Director-General Army Health Services (1982–84)	
Michael Jeffery	1937	2020	1985	Assistant Chief of the General Staff for Materiel (1991–93), Deputy Chief of the General Staff (1990–91), 1st Division (1986–88)	
Stephen Jobson		—	2021	Aviation Command (2021–24)	
George Johnston	1868	1949	1 October 1923	3rd Division (1922–27)	
Colin Karotam*		—	2020	Commander Defence Signals Intelligence and Cyber Command (2025–), First Assistant Director-General Expeditionary and Transnational Intelligence (2023–24), Head of Military Strategic Plans (2020–22)	
Michael Keating	1945	—	June 1994	Head Strategic Command (1999–00), Training Command (1996–99), 1st Division (1992–96)	
John Keldie	1934	2001	1988	2nd Division (1988–91)	
John Kelly	1929	—	1979	Field Force Command (1983–84), 1st Division (1979–81)	
Mark Kelly	1956	—	2004	Joint Task Force 633 (2009–10), Land Command (2005–08), 1st Division (2004–05)	
Roy Kendall+	1897	1963	2 November 1952		
Paul Kenny*		—	2020	Deputy Theatre Commander (2025–), Special Operations Command (2020–24)	
Donald Kerr	1910	1985	1 December 1962	Citizen Military Forces Member of the Military Board (1962–64)	
Jeremy King*		—	2022	Head Joint Aviation Systems Division (2023–), Head Land Capability (2022–23)	
Roy King+	1897	1959	17 March 1952 (Note: King was promoted to temporary major general on 27 August 1951; his rank was made substantive from 17 March 1952.)	Central Command (1952–54), Northern Command (1951–52), Principal Administrative Officer, British Commonwealth Forces in Japan and Korea (1951)	
Frank Kingsley Norris	1893	1984	15 September 1949 (Note: Kingsley Norris was promoted to temporary major general on 3 May 1948; his rank was made substantive from 15 September 1949.)	Director-General of Medical Services (1948–55)	
Keith Kirkland	1930	1999	1983		
Robert Knights	1912	1975	6 April 1961 (Note: Knights was promoted to temporary major general on 1 January 1958; his rank was made substantive from 6 April 1961.)	Southern Command (1966–69), Quartermaster-General (1963–66), Chairman, Joint Planning Committee (1962–63), Royal Military College, Duntroon (1960–62), Western Command (1959–60), Head Australian Joint Services Staff in the United Kingdom (1958–59)	
Michael Krause		—	2011	Deputy Chief of Staff – Plans, Headquarters International Security Assistance Force (2011–12)	
Douglas Laidlaw*		—	2021	Head Joint Support Services Division (2021–)	
Kevin Latchford	1927	2013	23 February 1981	Director General National Disaster Organisation (1981–84)	
Stanley Legge	1900	1977	12 April 1954 (Note: Legge was promoted to temporary major general on 16 December 1953; his rank was made substantive from 12 April 1954.)	Master-General of the Ordnance (1954–57), Quartermaster-General (1954–54)	(Note: Major General Stanley Legge was the son of Lieutenant General James Gordon Legge.)
Duncan Lewis	1953	—	19 December 2002	Special Operations Command (2002–04)	
Charles Lloyd	1899	1956	1 September 1942	Adjutant General (1943–46)	
Herbert Lloyd	1883	1957	1 September 1942 (Note: Lloyd was promoted to temporary major general on 24 October 1940. He was placed on the Retired List with the honorary rank of major general on 1 February 1946 but, in Executive Minute No. 10 of 26 February 1947, was retrospectively promoted to the substantive rank of major general with seniority from 1 September 1942.)	Second Army (1945), 1st Division (1943–45), Director-General of Recruiting (1941), 2nd Division (1940–43)	
William Locke+	1894	1962	18 December 1947		
Charles Long	1914	1980	8 February 1965 (Note: Long was promoted to temporary major general on 14 December 1963; his rank was made substantive from 8 February 1965.)	Adjutant-General (1968–70), Master-General of the Ordnance (1966–68), Head Australian Joint Services Staff in the United States (1964–66)	
Darryl Low Choy	1947	—	15 December 1997	Assistant Chief of the Defence Force (Reserves) (1998–2001), Assistant Chief of Army (Reserves) (1997–98)	
Denis Luttrell	1942	—	1991	Assistant Chief of the Defence Force (Reserves) (1994–98), Assistant Chief of the General Staff (Reserves) (1991–94)	
Denzil MacArthur-Onslow	1904	1984	16 August 1955 (Note: Denzil MacArthur-Onslow was promoted to temporary major general on 16 August 1954; his rank was made substantive from 16 August 1955.)	Citizen Military Forces Member of the Military Board (1958–60), 2nd Division (1954–57)	(Note: Major General Denzil MacArthur-Onslow was the nephew of Major General James Macarthur-Onslow and Brigadier General George MacArthur-Onslow.)
James Macarthur-Onslow+	1867	1946	7 November 1925		(Note: Major General James Macarthur-Onslow was the brother of Brigadier General George MacArthur-Onslow and uncle of Major General Denzil MacArthur-Onslow.)
Kenneth Mackay+	1859	1935	1920		
Kenneth Mackay	1917	2004	1 May 1966 (Note: Kenneth Mackay was promoted to temporary major general on 17 April 1966; his rank was made substantive from 1 May 1966.)	Field Force Command (1973–74), Eastern Command (1971–73), Quartermaster-General (1968–71), 1st Division (1967–68), Australian Force Vietnam (1966–67)	
Daniel McDaniel		—	November 2018	Deputy Commanding General – North, United States Army Pacific (2019–22)	
Bruce Alexander McDonald	1925	1993	1 February 1975 (Note: McDonald was promoted to temporary major general on 16 July 1974; his rank was made substantive from 1 February 1975.)	Training Command (1977–82), 1st Division (1976–77), Chief of the Army Reserve (1974–76)	
John MacDonald	1919	1996	24 September 1974 (Note: McDonald was promoted to temporary major general on 1 April 1973; his rank was made substantive from 24 September 1974.)	Citizen Military Forces Member of the Military Board (1974–77), 2nd Division (1973–74)	
Stuart McDonald	1912	1987	2 December 1966	3rd Division (1966–70)	
David McLachlan	1937	—	January 1991	Logistic Command (1991–94)	
Gus McLachlan		—	2012	Commander Forces Command (2016–18), Head of Modernisation and Strategic Planning (2015–16), Head Joint Capability Coordination (2014), Deputy Chief of Staff – Plans, Headquarters International Security Assistance Force (2012–13)	
Paul McLachlan		—	2012	1st Division (2015–18), Head Land Systems (2013–15)	
Maurie McNarn	1957	—	2004	Director Defence Intelligence Organisation (2005–09), Training Command – Army (2004)	
John McNeill	1921	2003	28 October 1974 (Note: McNeill was promoted to temporary major general on 1 May 1973; his rank was made substantive from 28 October 1974.)	Inspector-General of the Army Reserve (1977–78), Assistant Commander Logistic Command (1976–77), 3rd Division (1973–76)	
Ronald McNicoll	1906	1996	7 August 1957 (Note: McNicoll was promoted to temporary major general on 21 September 1956; his rank was made substantive from 7 August 1957.)	Master-General of the Ordnance (1960–64), Central Command (1959–60), Controller of Design and Inspection, Department of Supply (1956–59)	(Note: Major General Ronald McNicoll was the son of Brigadier General Sir Walter McNicoll and the elder brother of Vice Admiral Sir Alan McNicoll.)
Tim McOwan		—	2006	Head of Australian Defence Staff in Washington, D.C. (2011–13), Special Operations Command (2008–11), Chief of Defence Force Liaison Officer to the Chairman of the Joint Chiefs of Staff (2006–08)	
Frederick Maguire	1888	1953	26 March 1941	Director-General of Medical Services (1941–42)	
Gordon Maitland	1926	2018	26 January 1976 (Note: Maitland was promoted to temporary major general on 28 October 1974; his rank was made substantive from 26 January 1976.)	Inspector-General of the Army Reserve (1978–82), 2nd Divisional Field Force Group (1976–78), 2nd Division (1974–76)	
Steve Meekin	1955	—	2007		
Hugh Meggitt*		—	2025	Head Advanced Strategic Capabilities Accelerator (2025–)	
Greg Melick	1949	—	2007	Head of the Centenary of Anzac Planning Team (2011–18), Head of Cadet, Reserve and Employer Support Division (2007–11)	
Edward Milford	1894	1972	1 September 1942 (Note: Milford was promoted to temporary major general on 1 January 1941. His rank was made substantive in 1946, with seniority from 1 September 1942.)	Adjutant-General (1946–48), Deputy Chief of the General Staff (1946), Morotai Force (1945–46), 7th Division (1944–46), 5th Division (1942–43), Master-General of the Ordnance (1941–42)	(Note: Major General Edward Milford was the grandfather of Major General Michael Milford.)
Michael Milford	1962	—	11 February 2011	Head ICT Operations Division (2011–15)	(Note: Major General Michael Milford is the grandson of Major General Edward Milford.)
Robert Mohr	1925	2003	26 July 1982	Judge Advocate General (1985–87), Judge Advocate General – Army (1982–85)	
Jim Molan	1950	2023	1999	Chief of Operations, Multi-National Force – Iraq (2004–05), Australian Defence College (2002–04), 1st Division (1999–02)	
Newton Moore+	1870	1936	17 April 1930		
Basil Morris	1888	1975	1 September 1942 (Note: Morris was promoted to temporary major general on 1 January 1942. He was placed on the Retired List with the honorary rank of major general on 19 October 1946 but, in Executive Minute No. 10 of 26 February 1947, was retrospectively promoted to the substantive rank of major general with seniority from 1 September 1942.)	Australian New Guinea Administrative Unit (1942–46), New Guinea Lines of Communication Area (1942), New Guinea Force (1942), 8th Military District (1941–42)	
Alan Morrison	1927	2008	20 December 1977	Chief of Personnel (1981), Royal Military College, Duntroon (1977–81)	(Note: Major General Alan Morrison was the father of Lieutenant General David Morrison.)
David Mulhall	1964	—	2014	Commander Joint Logistics (2015–19), Joint Task Force 636 (2014–15), Deputy Chief of Staff – Support, Operation Resolute Support (2014–15)	
Allan Murchison	1917	2005	1 December 1967 (Note: Pearson was promoted to temporary major general on 1 December 1966; his rank was made substantive from 1 December 1967.)	Citizen Military Forces Member of the Military Board (1970–74), 2nd Division (1966–68)	
Ian Murdoch	1910	1992	23 March 1958	1st Division (1960–63), Deputy Chief of the General Staff (1958–60)	(Note: Major General Ian Murdoch was the son of Brigadier Thomas Murdoch and the elder brother of Air Marshal Sir Alister Murdoch.)
John Murray	1892	1951	1 September 1942 (Note: Murray was promoted to temporary major general on 7 January 1942. His rank was made substantive in 1946, with seniority from 1 September 1942.)	Northern Territory Force (1945–46), Rear Echelon, First Australian Army (1944–45), 4th Division (1942–44), 10th Division (1942), Newcastle Covering Force (1942)	
Kevin Murray	1929	1991	1 July 1978	Chief of the Army Reserve (1982–85), 2nd Divisional Field Force Group (1978–82)	
Charles New*	1959	—	2019	Surgeon-General of the Australian Defence Force Reserves (2019–)	
James Norrie	1922	2007	March 1976	Training Command – Army (1976–77)	
Gregory Novak*		—	2023	Commander Space Command (2023–)	
Barry Nunn		—	1987	Chief of the Army Reserve (1990–91), 3rd Division (1987–90)	
Craig Orme	1960	—	2009	Joint Task Force 633 (2013–14), Australian Defence College (2011–13), Head People Capability (2009–11)	
John Paton+	1867	1943	18 November 1926		
John Pearn	1940	—	1998	Surgeon General of the Australian Defence Force (1998–00)	
Matt Pearse*		—	2020	Head Force Integration (2024–), Defence Strategic Review Implementation Task Force (2023–24), Commander Forces Command (2020–22)	
Sandy Pearson	1918	2012	16 March 1971 (Note: Pearson was promoted to temporary major general on 13 October 1969; his rank was made substantive from 16 March 1971.)	Chief of Personnel (1973–75), Royal Military College, Duntroon (1970–73), 1st Division (1969–70)	
Owen Phillips	1882	1966	1 July 1936	Inspector of the Coast and Anti-Aircraft Defences (1939–41), Master-General of the Ordnance (1938–39), Quartermaster-General (1936–39)	
Peter Phillips	1935	—	December 1986	Assistant Chief of the General Staff – Personnel (1986–89)	
Eric Plant	1890	1950	1 September 1942 (Note: Plant was promoted to temporary major general on 6 January 1942. He was placed on the Retired List with the honorary rank of major general on 23 August 1946 but, in Executive Minute No. 10 of 26 February 1947, was retrospectively promoted to the substantive rank of major general with seniority from 1 September 1942.)	New South Wales Lines of Communication Area (1943–46), Victoria Lines of Communication Area (1942–43), Western Command (1942), 5th Military District (1942)	
Francis Poke	1923	2018	7 October 1977 (Note: Risson was promoted to temporary major general on 7 January 1977; his rank was made substantive from 7 October 1977.)	Logistic Command (1977–80)	
Selwyn Porter	1905	1963	2 January 1951	Citizen Military Forces Member of the Military Board (1953–54), 2nd Division (1950–53)	
Stephen Porter	1961	—	2015	2nd Division (2015–18)	
Arthur Powell	1929	2024	17 May 1982	Chief of Supply (1982–84)	
Roger Powell	1949	—	23 April 1999	Deputy Force Commander, United Nations Transitional Administration in East Timor (2001–02), Training Command – Army (1999–01)	
Beauchamp Pulver	1897	1981	23 November 1950	Master-General of the Ordnance (1950–54)	
Gustave Ramaciotti+	1861	1927	25 March 1920		
Alan Ramsay	1895	1973	21 January 1944	11th Division (1945), 5th Division (1944–45)	
George Rankin	1887	1957	1 June 1946 (Note: Rankin was appointed to the local rank of major general on 1 July 1937 and, at this rank, served as General Officer Commanding 2nd Cavalry Division (1936–42). He was transferred to the Unattached List on 12 February 1942 and placed on the Retired List, with the substantive rank of major general, on 1 June 1946.)		
Anthony Rawlins		—	2018	Head Force Design (2022–25), Deputy Chief of Army (2018–22)	
William Refshauge	1913	2009	26 June 1955	Director-General of Medical Services (1955–60)	
John Richardson	1880	1954	1 September 1942 (Note: Richardson was appointed to the local rank of major general on 1 July 1937. He was transferred to the Unattached List on 5 January 1942 and, in Executive Minute No. 10 of 26 February 1947, was retrospectively promoted to the substantive rank of major general with seniority from 1 September 1942.)	1st Cavalry Division (1936–42)	
Robert Risson	1901	1992	2 July 1954 (Note: Risson was promoted to temporary major general on 2 July 1953; his rank was made substantive from 2 July 1954.)	Citizen Military Forces Member of the Military Board (1957–58), 3rd Division (1953–56)	
Frank Roberts	1951	—	2001	Strategic Policy Division (2004–05), Deputy Chief of Army (2002–04), Training Command – Army (2001–02)	
Len Roberts-Smith	1946	—	2002	Judge Advocate General (2002–07)	
William Rodgers	1936	—	1985	Surgeon General of the Australian Defence Force (1985–90)	
Jeffrey Rosenfeld	1952	—	2009	Surgeon-General of the Australian Defence Force Reserves (2009–11)	
Charles Rosenthal	1875	1954	22 May 1918	AIF Depots in the United Kingdom (1919), 2nd Division (1918–19, 1921–26, 1932–37)	
David Rossi	1945	—	1992	Surgeon General of the Australian Defence Force (1992–96)	
Mick Ryan		—	2018	Australian Defence College (2018–22)	
Granville Ryrie	1865	1937	18 June 1920 (Note: Ryrie was appointed temporary major general on 16 April 1919. He relinquished the temporary rank and was appointed an honorary major general on 11 November 1919, before the rank was made substantive from 18 June 1920.)	1st Cavalry Division (1921–27), ANZAC Mounted Division (1918–19)	
Victor Sellheim	1866	1928	3 January 1920	Quartermaster-General (1922–27), Adjutant-General (1920–27)	
Jeff Sengelman		—	2011	Special Operations Command (2014–17), Head of Modernisation and Strategic Planning – Army (2012–14), Deputy Chief of Army (2011–12), Commander Forces Command (2011)	
Raymond Sharp	1929	2022	1982	2nd Division (1982–84)	
Edward Sheehan+	1898	1969	1 April 1955		
Colin Hall Simpson	1894	1964	1 September 1942 (Note: Colin Simpson was promoted to temporary major general on 6 April 1942. He was placed on the Retired List with the honorary rank of major general on 8 November 1946 but, in Executive Minute No. 10 of 26 February 1947, was retrospectively promoted to the substantive rank of major general with seniority from 1 September 1942.)	Signal Officer-in-Chief (1942–46)	
Noel Simpson	1907	1971	1 July 1960 (Note: Noel Simpson was promoted to temporary major general on 1 July 1959; his rank was made substantive on 1 July 1960.)	Citizen Military Forces Member of the Military Board (1960–62), 3rd Division (1959–60)	
Mick Slater	1958	—	2008	Commander Forces Command (2011–15), 1st Division (2009–11), Head Defence Personnel (2008–09)	
Neville Smethurst	1935	2019	1985	Land Commander Australia (1987–90), Field Force Command (1987), Assistant Chief of Defence Force – Operations (1985–87)	
Chris Smith*		—	2022	Deputy Chief of Army (2024–), Deputy Commanding General – Strategy and Plans, United States Army Pacific (2022–24)	
Michael Smith		—	2000	Deputy Force Commander, United Nations Transitional Administration in East Timor (2000–01)	
Steve Smith	1959	—	2012	2nd Division (2012–14)	
Stuart Smith	1963	—	2012	Deputy Chief of Joint Operations (2015–17), 1st Division (2012–15), Joint Task Force 633 (2012)	
John Stanley+	1851	1935	20 July 1918		
Victor Stantke	1886	1967	1 September 1942	Queensland Lines of Communication Area (1943–46), Adjutant-General (1940–43)	
Clive Steele	1892	1955	1 September 1942 (Note: Steele was promoted to temporary major general on 5 January 1942. He was placed on the Reserve of Officers (General List) with the honorary rank of major general on 12 March 1946 but, in Executive Minute No. 10 of 26 February 1947, was retrospectively promoted to the substantive rank of major general with seniority from 1 September 1942.)	Engineer-in-Chief (1942–46)	
William Steele+	1895	1966	5 February 1950		
John Stein	1936	2025	1985	Logistic Command (c. 1987–91), Chief of Logistics (1985–87)	
Jack Stevens	1896	1969	1 September 1942	Citizen Military Forces Member of the Military Board (1950), 2nd Division (1947–50), 6th Division (1943–45), 12th Division (1942–43), Northern Territory Force (1942–43), 4th Division (1942)	
Paul Stevens	1946	—	1993	Chief of the General Staff – Personnel (1993–97)	
John Stevenson	1925	2008	1 June 1976 (Note: Stevenson was promoted to temporary major general on 5 March 1976; his rank was made substantive from 1 June 1976.)	Chief of Logistics (1979–82), Logistic Command (1976–79)	
Alan Stretton	1922	2012	1 February 1975 (Note: Streeton was promoted to temporary major general on 2 July 1974; his rank was made substantive from 1 February 1975.)	Director-General Natural Disasters Organisation (1974–78)	
Paul Symon	1960	—	2009	Director Defence Intelligence Organisation (2011–14), Deputy Chief of Army (2009–11)	
Ken Taylor	1929	2008	28 May 1982	Chief of Materiel – Army (1982–85)	
Thomas Taylor		1988	21 January 1963 (Note: Taylor was promoted to temporary major general on 12 December 1960; his rank was made substantive from 21 January 1963.)	Southern Command (1964–66), Deputy Chief of General Staff (1960–64)	
David Thomae		—	2021	Joint Task Force 629 (2021–24), 2nd Division (2021–24)	
Murray Thompson		—	2020	Head ICT Operations (2020–23)	
Edwin Tivey	1866	1947	19 June 1920 (Note: Tivey was appointed temporary major general on 28 November 1918. He relinquished the temporary rank and was appointed an honorary major general on 10 May 1919, before the rank was made substantive from 18 June 1920.)	2nd Cavalry Division (1921–26), 5th Infantry Division (1918–19)	
Kathryn Toohey		—	2017	Head Force Integration Division (2019–23), Head of Land Capability (2017–19)	
Richard Tracey	1948	2019	2007	Judge Advocate General (2007–14)	
Richard Vagg*		—	2023	Head Capability Development (2026–), Head Land Capability (2023–26)	
George Alan Vasey	1895	1945	1 September 1942	7th Division (1942–1944), 6th Division (1942), Deputy Chief of the General Staff (1942)	
Norman Vickery	1917	1998	1 December 1963	Citizen Military Forces Member of the Military Board (1966–70), 3rd Division (1963–66)	
Douglas Vincent	1916	1995	31 January 1967 (Note: Vincent was promoted to temporary major general on 9 May 1966; his rank was made substantive from 31 January 1967.)	Chief of Personnel (1972–73), Adjutant-General (1970–72), Head Australian Joint Services Staff in the United States (1968–70), Commander Australian Force Vietnam (1967–68), 1st Division (1966–67)	
Ronald Wade	1905	1995	21 September 1956 (Note: Wade was promoted to temporary major general on 18 November 1955; his rank was made substantive from 21 September 1956.)	Northern Command (1961–62), Adjutant-General (1957–61), Head Australian Joint Services Staff in the United States (1955–57)	
Jason Walk*		—	2022	Head National Support (2025–), Commander Joint Logistics (2022–25)	
Ernest Wallack+	1857	1932	1 August 1918		
Roy Walsh	1888	1962	1 September 1942	Director of Medical Services, First Australian Army (1942–43)	
Robert Watson*	—	—	2025	Commander Cyber Command (2025–)	
William Watson	1924	2004	15 September 1975	Director-General Army Health Services (1975–82)	
Carla Watts*	1976	—	2025	Commander Joint Logistics (2025–)	
Ian Westwood	1953	—	2014	Chief Military Judge and Chief Judge Advocate (2007–18)	
Arthur White+	1860	1946	27 October 1922		
Martin White*		—	2026	Australian Defence College (2026–)	
John Whitelaw	1894	1964	1 September 1942	Western Command (1946–51), Victoria Lines of Communication Area (1945–46), Major General, Royal Artillery (1942–45)	(Note: Major General John Stewart Whitelaw (1894–1964) was the father of Major General John Whitelaw (1921–2010).)
John Whitelaw	1921	2010	25 August 1975 (Note: Whitelaw was promoted to temporary major general on 29 April 1974; his rank was made substantive from 25 August 1975.)	Deputy Chief of the General Staff (1977–78), Chief of Personnel – Army (1975–77), Chief of Operations (1974–75)	(Note: Major General John Whitelaw (1921–2010) was the son of Major General John Stewart Whitelaw (1894–1964).)
Wilford Whittle+	1892	1964	31 December 1948		
Simone Wilkie	1964	—	2013	Head of Joint Enablers (2015–18), Australian Defence College (2013–18)	
Robert Williams+	1855	1943	1 January 1920		
Thomas Williams	1884	1950	1 July 1940	Chief Military Advisor to the Director-General of Munitions (1941–44), Master-General of the Ordnance (1939–40)	
William Williams	1856	1919	1 January 1917	(Note: Williams had been appointed to the honorary rank of surgeon-general (equivalent to major general) in 1901 and, at that rank, served as Director-General of Australian Army Medical Services (1901–14) and Director-General of Medical Services for the Australian Imperial Force (1914–15), before he was placed on the Retired List with the substantive rank of surgeon-general on 1 January 1917.)	
John Williamson	1926	1980	1 June 1976 (Note: Williamson was promoted to temporary major general on 25 August 1975; his rank was made substantive from 1 June 1976.)	Field Force Command (1979–80), Deputy Chief of General Staff (1978–79), Chief of Operations (1975–78)	
Simon Willis	1948	—	October 1999	Head of Australian Defence Staff in Washington, D.C. (2002–04), Head Defence Personnel Executive (2000–02), Head Joint Education and Training (1999–00)	
Arthur Gillespie Wilson	1900	1982	29 August 1954	Central Command (1954–57)	
Neil Wilson	1947	—	2001	Assistant Chief of the Defence Force (Reserves) and Head Reserve Policy (2004–07), 2nd Division (2001–02)	
Richard Wilson	1955	—	2005	Director Defence Intelligence Organisation (2009–11), 1st Division (2007–09), Training Command – Army (2005–07)	
Victor Windeyer	1900	1987	1 January 1951 (Note: Windeyer was promoted to temporary major general on 1 July 1950; his rank was made substantive from 1 January 1951.)	Citizen Military Forces Member of the Military Board (1950–53), 2nd Division (1950–52)	
Robert Woollard	1921	2009	27 January 1975	Controller of Establishments (1975–78)	
George Wootten	1893	1970	1 September 1942	Citizen Military Forces Member of the Military Board (1948–50), 3rd Division (1947–50), 9th Division (1943–45)	

== Brigadier generals ==
Australian brigadier general's rank insignia

This along with the + (plus sign) indicates that the officer was granted the honorary rank of brigadier general on the Retired List, without having held the rank while in service.

Name	Born	Died	Date appointed	Senior command(s) or appointment(s) in rank	Notes
Sir Robert Anderson	1865	1940	1 December 1916	AIF Headquarters London (1916–17)	
Stuart Milligan Anderson	1879	1954	12 October 1917	Royal Artillery, 1st Australian Division (1917–18)	
Alfred Bessell-Browne	1877	1947	18 January 1917	Royal Artillery, 5th Australian Division (1917–19)	
William Kinsey Bolton+	1860	1941	1 July 1920		
Sydney Christian	1868	1931	21 February 1916	Royal Artillery, 5th Australian Division (1916–17)	
Cecil Foott	1876	1942	23 July 1917	4th Division (1930–31), 3rd Military District (1930–31), 1st Military District (1926–29), 11th Mixed Brigade (1926–29), Director of Equipment and Ordnance Stores (1922–25), Deputy Adjutant-General (1920–22), Deputy Director of Repatriation (1918–19), Chief Engineer, Australian Corps (1918), Deputy Adjutant and Quartermaster-General, AIF Depots in the United Kingdom (1917–18)	
Hubert Foster	1855	1919	1 March 1916	Director of Military Art (1917–18), Chief of the General Staff (1916–17)	
Duncan Glasfurd	1873	1916	1 March 1916	12th Brigade (1916)	
Henry Goddard	1869	1955	1 June 1918	14th Brigade (1921–26), 9th Brigade (1918–19)	
William Grant	1870	1939	13 August 1917	1st Cavalry Brigade (1919–25), 4th Light Horse Brigade (1917–19), 3rd Light Horse Brigade (1917)	
Thomas Griffiths	1865	1947	1 January 1918	Administrator of Nauru (1921–27), Administrator of the Territory of New Guinea (1920–21), Inspector-General of Administration (1920), AIF Headquarters London (1917–19)	
James Heane	1874	1954	3 December 1916	5th Brigade (1921–26), 11th Brigade (1920–21), 1st Division Demobilization Group (1919), 2nd Brigade (1916–19)	
Sydney Herring	1881	1951	30 June 1918	5th Brigade (1926–30), 10th Brigade (1920–21), 13th Brigade (1918–19)	
Alexander Jobson	1875	1933	1 May 1916	9th Brigade (1916–17)	
John Lamrock+	1859	1935	1 July 1920		
Raymond Leane	1878	1962	1 June 1918	3rd Brigade (1921–26), 19th Brigade (1920–21), 12th Brigade (1918–19)	
George Long	1874	1930	1 January 1919	Director of Education (1919)	
George MacArthur-Onslow	1875	1931	3 September 1918	1st Cavalry Division (1927–31), 4th Cavalry Brigade (1923–26), 6th Light Horse Regiment (1921–23), 5th Light Horse Brigade (1918)	(Note: Brigadier General George MacArthur-Onslow was the brother of Major General James Macarthur-Onslow and uncle of Major General Denzil MacArthur-Onslow.)
Henry Normand MacLaurin	1878	1915	15 August 1914	1st Brigade (1914–15)	
Edward Fowell Martin	1875	1950	28 June 1918	6th Brigade (1920–21), 5th Brigade (1918–19)	
John Patrick McGlinn	1869	1946	17 March 1918	Deputy Assistant and Quartermaster-General, AIF Depots (1918–19)	
Walter McNicoll	1877	1947	1 May 1916	Director of Education (1918–19), 10th Brigade (1916–18)	(Note: Brigadier General Sir Walter McNicoll was the father of Major General Ronald McNicoll and Vice Admiral Sir Alan McNicoll.)
John Meredith	1864	1942	13 February 1917	2nd Cavalry Brigade (1921–23), 4th Light Horse Brigade (1917)	
Samuel Pethebridge	1862	1918	1 May 1916	Administrator of the Territory of New Guinea (1915–17)	
Colin Rankin	1869	1940	1 May 1916	11th Brigade (1916)	
James Robertson	1878	1951	1 December 1916	7th Brigade (1921–26), 3rd Brigade (1920–21), 6th Brigade (1918–19), Director of Training, AIF Depots (1918), 12th Brigade (1916–17)	
Robert Smith	1881	1928	1 January 1917	2nd Brigade (1921–26), 18th Brigade (1920–21), 17th Brigade (1920), 5th Brigade (1917–18)	
James Stewart	1884	1947	23 March 1918	15th Brigade (1930–34), 10th Brigade (1921–26), 14th Brigade (1918–21)	
Walter Tunbridge+	1856	1943	1 January 1920		
Lachlan Chisholm Wilson	1871	1947	30 October 1917	1st Cavalry Brigade (1929–31), 11th Mixed Brigade (1925–29), 3rd Light Horse Brigade (1917–19)	
Evan Wisdom	1869	1945	1 December 1916	22nd Brigade (1920–21), 7th Brigade (1916–19)	

== See also ==
- List of Royal Australian Navy admirals
- List of Royal Australian Air Force air marshals
