= Robert Jackson (general) =

Australian general

- Born: 1 January 1886; Crows Nest, Queensland
- Died: 24 November 1948 (aged 62); Heidelberg, Victoria
- Relatives: Donald Robert Jackson (son); Dawn Jackson (daughter); Oliver David Jackson (son)
- Military career
- Allegiance: Australia
- Branch: Australian Army
- Service years: 1907–1942
- Rank: Major General
- Commands: Western Command (1941–42); 5th Military District (1941–42); Northern Command (1940–41); 1st Military District (1940–41); 1st Division (1939–40)
- Conflicts: First World War; Second World War
- Awards: Companion of the Order of St Michael and St George; Distinguished Service Order; Mentioned in Despatches (4); Knight of the Legion of Honour (France)

Major General Robert Edward Jackson, CMG, DSO (1 January 1886 – 24 November 1948) was an Australian railway engineer and a senior officer in the Australian Army during the Second World War.

Military offices
Preceded by Major General James Durrant	General Officer Commanding Western Command; 1941–1942	Succeeded by Major General Eric Plant
Preceded by Major General Henry Wynter	General Officer Commanding Northern Command; 1940–1941	Succeeded by Major General James Durrant
Preceded by Major General John Hardie	General Officer Commanding 1st Division; 1939–1940	Succeeded by Major General Albert Fewtrell
