= Duncan Glasfurd =

British Army general (1873–1916)

Brigadier-General Duncan Glasfurd
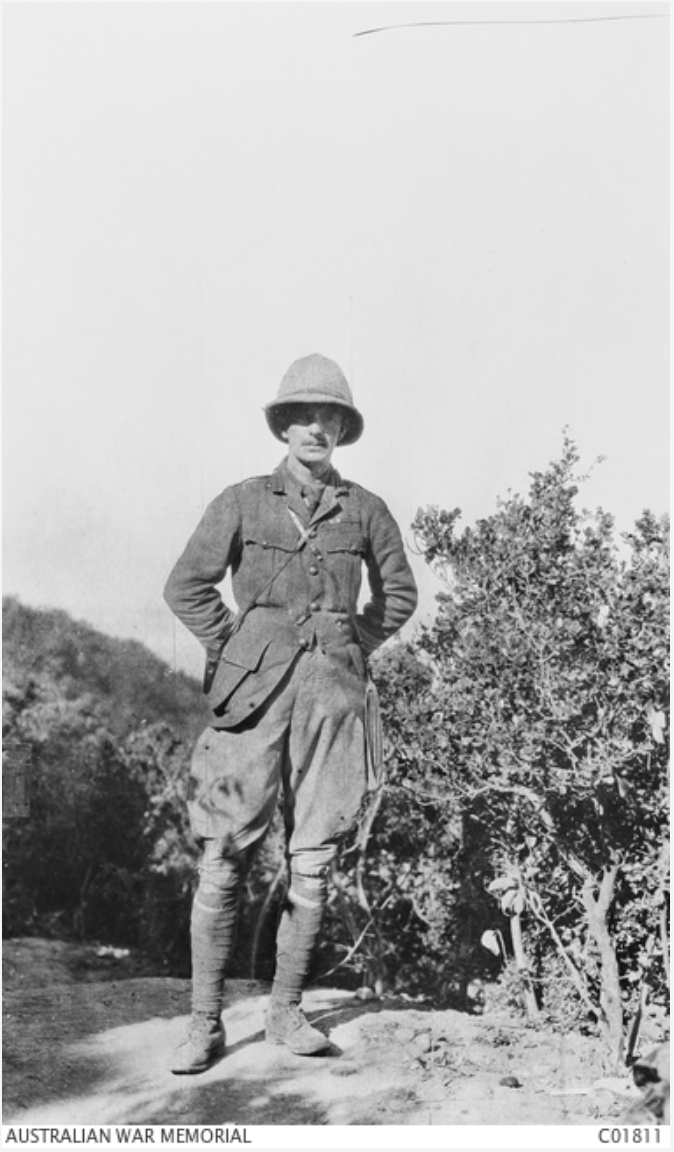
- Glasfurd in April 1915
- Born: 23 November 1873; Matheran, India
- Died: 12 November 1916 (aged 42); Flers, France
- Military career
- Allegiance: British Army; Australian Army
- Service years: 1893–1916
- Rank: Brigadier-General
- Commands: 12th Brigade
- Conflicts: Second Boer War; First World War; Gallipoli Campaign; Battle of the Somme
- Awards: Mention in Despatches (4)

Brigadier-General Duncan John Glasfurd (23 November 1873 – 12 November 1916) was a British Army and later Australian Army colonel and temporary brigadier general in the First World War. He was mentioned in despatches for his role in evacuating Anzac Cove. He was mortally wounded by a German shell at Flers.

== Early life and career ==
Duncan John Glasfurd was born in Matheran, India, on 23 November 1873, the second son of Major General Charles Lamont Glasfurd (d.1887) of the Bombay Staff Corps. He was educated in Edinburgh, Scotland, and at the Royal Military College, Sandhurst, England.

Glasfurd was commissioned as a second lieutenant in the 2nd Battalion, Argyll and Sutherland Highlanders, on 21 October 1893, and was promoted to lieutenant on 23 February 1896. He served as adjutant of the 1st Battalion from 4 May 1898, including during their stay in South Africa during the Second Boer War. Promoted to captain on 11 January 1900, he saw action in the Orange Free State; the battle of Paardeberg (February 1900), where he was wounded; the Transvaal and the Orange River Colony where he was seriously wounded near Rustenburg in October 1900.

From April to November 1901, Glasfurd participated in operations against the Diiriye Guure in Somalia. He returned to India, and in January 1902 was transferred from supernumerary captain to regular captain in the 2nd battalion of his regiment. He was again selected for special service in Somaliland in February 1903, to participate in further operations against the Mad Mullah in 1903–04, in which he commanded the 4th Somali Camel Corps. For his services in Somalia, Glasfurd was mentioned in despatches.

After another tour in India, Glasfurd returned to Scotland in June 1908, where he became staff captain for coast defences, Scottish Command. Later that year he was selected to attend the staff college at Camberley, England. Graduating in 1909, he rejoined his regiment in Malta in May 1910. In November, he was appointed brigade major of the Lothian Infantry Brigade.

On 24 June 1912, Glasfurd was seconded to the Australian Army as Director of Military Training, with the rank of captain. He was responsible for the program of compulsory training of cadets. Glasfurd was enthusiastic about the task, but dissatisfied with the quality of training being carried out by some of the area officers, whom he regarded as unsuitable for this particular task. He was also concerned about the volume of clerical work that the area officers were burdened with. On 20 September 1913, Glasfurd was promoted to major in the British and Australian armies.

== First World War ==
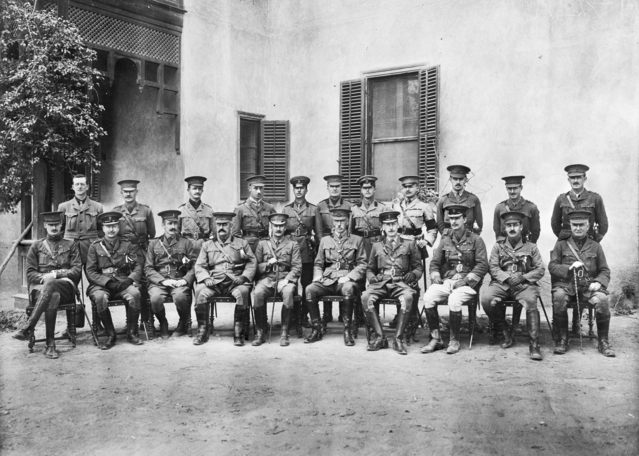
Group portrait of 1st Division staff officers at Mena Camp, December 1914. Glasfurd, then a major, is in the front row, third from the left.

When war was declared, Glasfurd immediately requested permission to rejoin his regiment. Permission was not forthcoming; Major General Bridges needed a staff college graduate for his 1st Division Headquarters, and Glasfurd was chosen. On 15 August 1914 he was appointed to the Australian Imperial Force as General Staff Officer (2nd Grade) (GSO2), with the rank of major. As such he was particularly responsible for training, and he supervised the training of the 1st Division at Mena Camp in Egypt.

Glasfurd landed at Anzac Cove at 5:35 am on 25 April 1915. He climbed Ari Burnu straight to Colonel E. G. Sinclair-MacLagan's headquarters, where he was informed that the 2nd Brigade, instead of coming in on the left, would, owing to the 3rd Brigade having landed too far north, be diverted towards Lone Pine on the right. He returned to the beach where he found the senior officer ashore of that brigade, Lieutenant Colonel Harold Elliott. In the original plan, Glasfurd was supposed to meet the 2nd Brigade and guide it ashore. In fact, Glasfurd had come ashore a few minutes later than Elliott and the rest of the brigade was not yet ashore. Glasfurd decided to form up units in Shrapnel Gully as they arrived, and started with Elliott's battalion, which he directed to Lone Pine.

Glasfurd did not always get along with his superior, Lieutenant Colonel C White, who gathered all the staff functions to himself, leaving Glasfurd with little to do. When White became sick, Glasfurd took over as GSO1 of the 1st Division. White did not return, instead becoming Brigadier General General Staff (BGGS) of ANZAC, and so on 1 October 1915, the appointment became permanent and Glasfurd was promoted to temporary lieutenant colonel. During the evacuation of Anzac Cove, Glasfurd represented the 1st Division on the Rear Party staff of A. Russell, which controlled operations at Anzac Cove until Russell handed over to Colonel J. Paton. For his services at Anzac Cove, Glasfurd was mentioned in dispatches and made a brevet lieutenant colonel in the British Army in January 1916.

On 1 March 1916, Glasfurd was appointed commander of the newly formed 12th Infantry Brigade, with the rank of colonel and temporary brigadier general. His first test was a route march across the Sinai Desert. By the simple expedient of resting his men from 8:50 am to 3:25 pm he managed to avoid the hottest hours of the day and still make good time. Although many men fell out, the brigade reached its bivouac in good order.

The 12th Brigade moved to France in June 1916 and on 4 July entered the line in the "nursery" sector near Armentières, where Glasfurd was slightly wounded on 7 July. In August 1916, the brigade was committed to action on the Somme sector, in the fighting on the Pozières Heights and Mouquet Farm. On 12 November 1916, the brigade was sent into the line again at Flers. While inspecting the line into which his brigade was about to move, Glasfurd was wounded by a German shell in "Cheese Road". After an agonising ten-hour stretcher journey from the front line to the advanced dressing station, Glasfurd died that night at the British 38th Casualty Clearing Station. He was buried in the Heilly Court Cemetery at Mericourt-l'Abbe, France. For his services on the Western Front, he was twice mentioned in despatches.

== See also ==
- List of Australian generals
- List of generals of the British Empire who died during the First World War
