= Swan Barracks =

Former military barracks building in Perth, Western Australia

- Perth, Western Australia
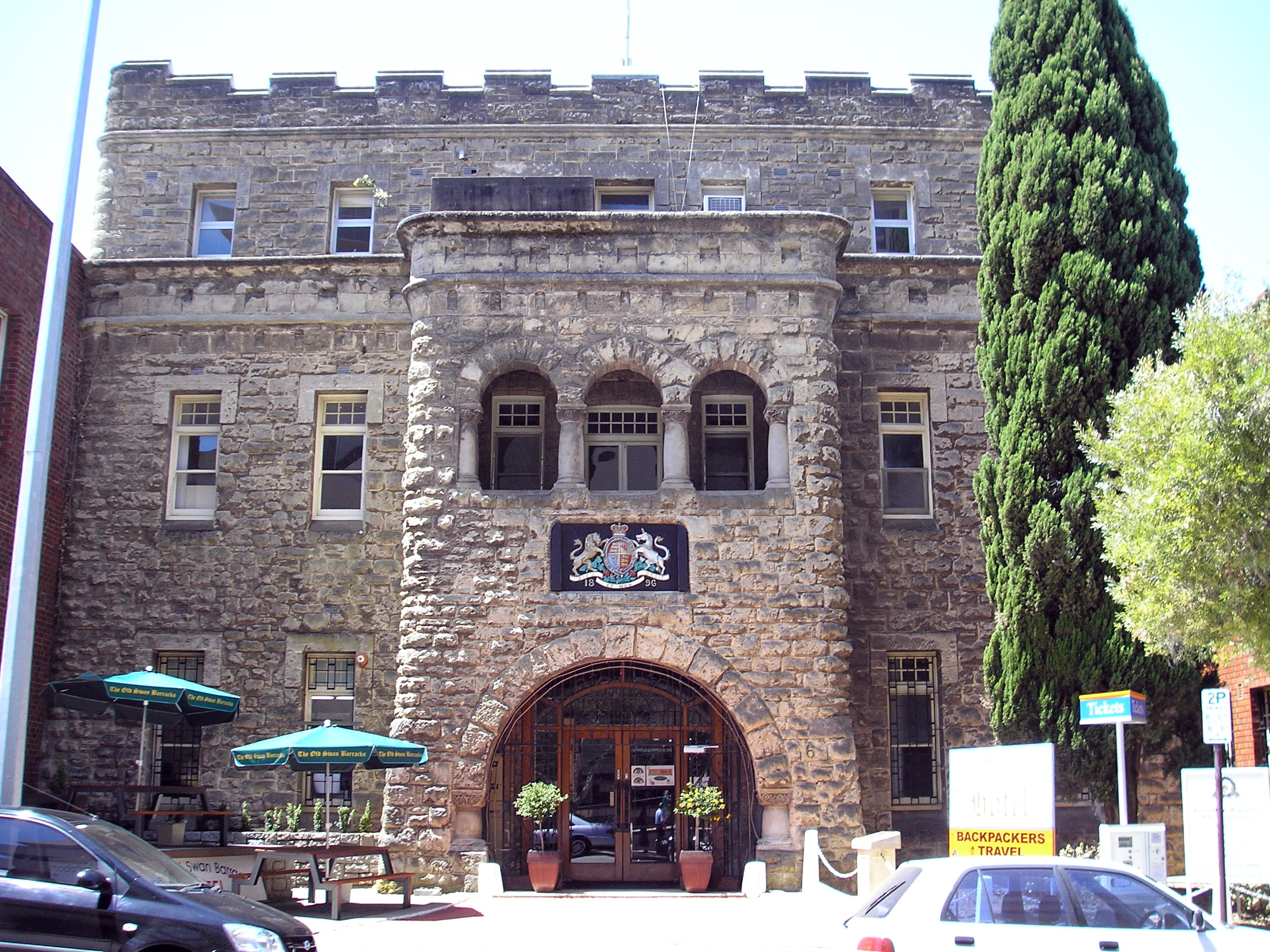
- Swan Barracks in 2006

Site information
- Operator: Australian Army
- Open to the public: Yes, since decommissioning

Location
- Coordinates: 31°56′56″S 115°51′44″E

Site history
- Built: 1896
- In use: 96 years

Garrison information
- Garrison: 5th Military District; 5th Division

Swan Barracks was a military establishment in Francis Street, Perth, Western Australia. The heritage listed building is located between Museum and Beaufort Streets.

== Military use ==
The barracks began as an unnamed drill hall constructed in 1896 prior to the Federation of Australia. An administration building was later constructed in a style described by the heritage register as "a romantic interpretation of a fortress".

Upon federation the barracks was used by the Australian Army, and became the headquarters of its 5th Military District. An ordnance store was added to the complex in 1905. The barracks was named in 1928.

Swan Barracks was a military headquarters during the Second World War. Additional wings were added to the eastern and western sides of the complex during the early years of the war. It was the headquarters of the 5th Division.

The Australian Army used the complex throughout the Cold War. In 1992 the Army units stationed at Swan Barracks were relocated to Leeuwin Barracks in Fremantle. The complex was sold in 1999.

== Heritage listing and civilian use ==
The Swan Barracks complex was added to the heritage list in 1985 and the state heritage register in 1993.

The buildings have served a number of uses since decommissioning, including as a backpacker hostel and a private college.
