= Sydney Christian =

Australian general (1868–1931)

Sydney Earnest Christian
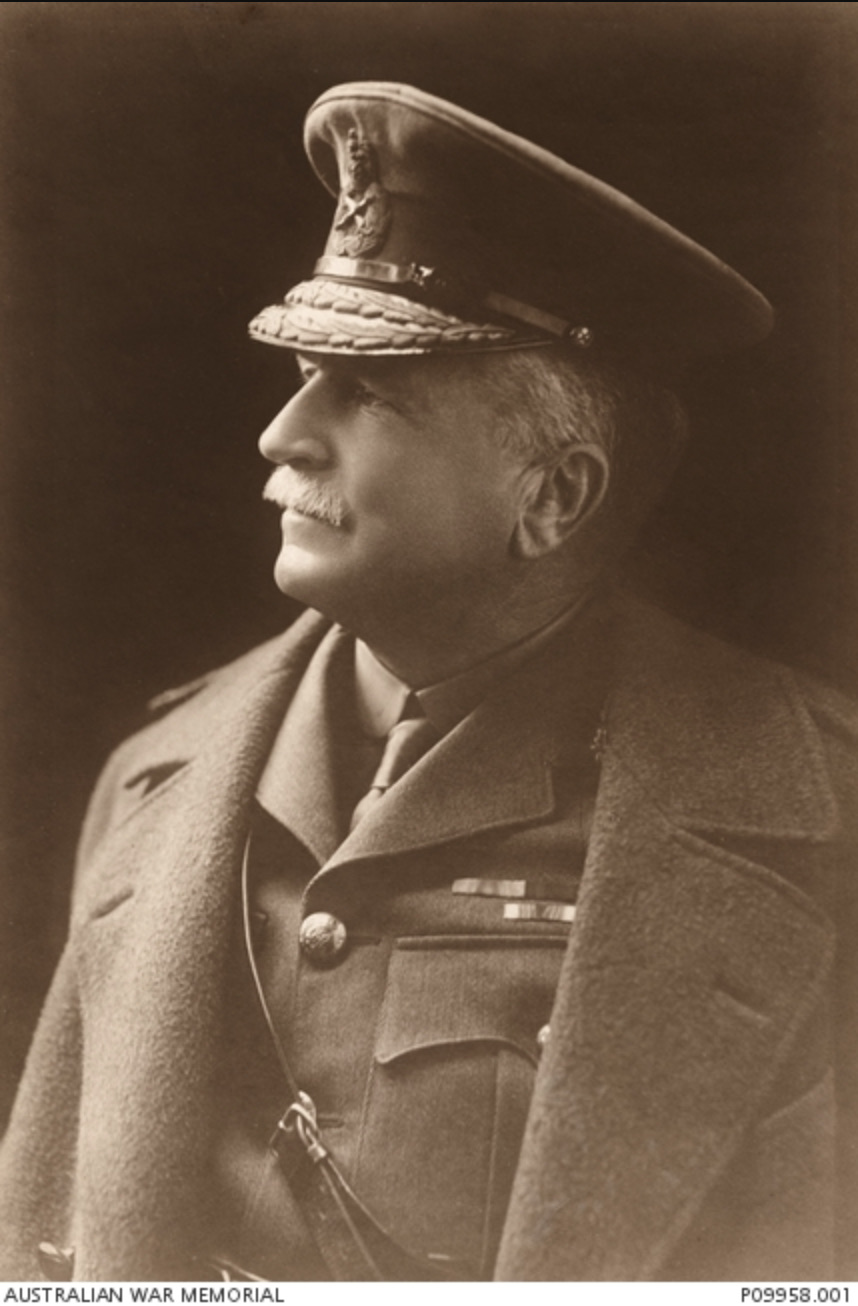
- Christian, c.1916
- Born: 17 April 1868; Sydney, New South Wales
- Died: 17 May 1931 (aged 63); Sydney, New South Wales
- Military career
- Allegiance: Australia
- Branch: Australian Army
- Service years: 1891–1918
- Rank: Brigadier General
- Commands: 5th Division Artillery (1916–17); 1st Field Artillery Brigade (1914–16); 1st Battery, Royal Australian Field Artillery (1910–14)
- Conflicts: Second Boer War; First World War; Gallipoli Campaign; Battle of Fromelles; Battle of the Somme
- Awards: Companion of the Order of St Michael and St George; Mentioned in Despatches (2); Legion of Honour (France)

Sydney Earnest Christian, CMG (17 April 1868 – 17 May 1931) was an Australian Army colonel and temporary brigadier general in the First World War. He retired in 1918 with the rank of honorary brigadier general.

== See also ==
- List of Australian generals
