= Sandy Pearson =

Australian Army officer

Cedric Maudsley Ingram Pearson
- Born: 24 August 1918; Kurri Kurri, New South Wales, Australia
- Died: 7 November 2012 (aged 94); Narrabeen, New South Wales, Australia
- Military career
- Allegiance: Australia
- Branch: Australian Army
- Service years: 1937–1975
- Rank: Major General
- Nickname: "Sandy"
- Commands: Royal Military College, Duntroon (1970–73); 1st Division (1969–70); 1st Australian Task Force (1968–69); 1st Battalion, Royal Australian Regiment (1962–64)
- Conflicts: Second World War; Indonesia–Malaysia confrontation Vietnam War
- Awards: Officer of the Order of Australia; Distinguished Service Order; Officer of the Order of the British Empire; Military Cross; Legion of Merit (United States); Knight of the National Order of Vietnam; Cross of Gallantry with Palm (Vietnam)

Major General Cedric Maudsley Ingram "Sandy" Pearson, AO, DSO, OBE, MC (24 August 1918 – 7 November 2012) was an Australian Army officer. He was a Commander of Australian Forces during the Vietnam War, Commandant of the Royal Military College, Duntroon and Director of the Royal Agricultural Society of New South Wales.

== Early life and family ==
CMI Pearson (known as Sandy) was born in Kurri Kurri, New South Wales, the son of Margaret and the Rev. George Ingram Pearson, a Methodist minister. Pearson attended Newington College (1932–1936) before graduating from the Royal Military College, Duntroon, in 1940.

== Army career ==
- Served Second World War, (1942–1945)
- Served Singapore, (1966–1968)
- Commander 1st Australian Task Force, Vietnam, (1968–1969)
- Commandant, Royal Military College, Duntroon, (1970–1973)
- Chief of Personnel, Australian Army, (1973–1975)

== Post army career ==
- Executive Director, Royal Agricultural Society of NSW, (1976–1983)
- Director, Brickworks Ltd, (1983–1998)

== Committees ==
- RSL Committees, (1977–2002)
- Newington College Council, (1978–1998)
- NSW Homeless Children, (1981–1990)

== Death ==
Aged 94, Pearson died on 7 November 2012 at the RSL Village in Narrabeen, New South Wales. His funeral was held eight days later at the Newington College Chapel, Stanmore.

== Notes ==
Military offices
Preceded by Major General Colin Fraser	Commandant of the Royal Military College, Duntroon; 1970–1973	Succeeded by Major General Robert Hay
Preceded by Brigadier Stuart Weir (Acting)	Commander 1st Division; 1969–1970	Succeeded by Major General Robert Hay
