= Eric Plant =

Eric Clive Pegus Plant
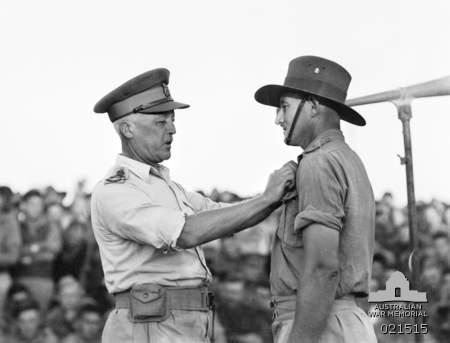
- The then Brigadier Eric Plant, commander of 25th Brigade, pinning the Victoria Cross ribbon on Corporal Jim Gordon, Syria, November 1941
- Born: 23 April 1890; Charters Towers, Queensland
- Died: 17 May 1950 (aged 60); Bayview, New South Wales
- Relatives: Edmund Plant (uncle); Michael Plant (son)
- Military career
- Allegiance: Australia
- Branch: Australian Army
- Service years: 1908–1946
- Rank: Major General
- Service number: QX6392
- Commands: New South Wales Lines of Communication Area (1943–46); Victoria Lines of Communication Area (1942–43); Western Command (1942); 5th Military District (1942); 25th Brigade (1941); 24th Brigade (1940–41); Royal Military College, Duntroon (1939–40)
- Conflicts: First World War; Gallipoli Campaign; Landing at Anzac Cove; Western Front; Battle of Pozières; Second Battle of Bullecourt; Second World War; North African Campaign; Syrian Campaign; Home Front
- Awards: Companion of the Order of the Bath; Distinguished Service Order & Bar; Officer of the Order of the British Empire; Officer of the Order of St. John of Jerusalem; Mentioned in Despatches (6); Croix de guerre (France)

Major General Eric Clive Pegus Plant, CB, DSO & Bar, OBE (23 April 1890 – 17 May 1950) was an officer in the Australian Army who served during the First and Second World Wars. Plant served in the pre-war part-time military from 1908, before joining the permanent forces in 1912. During the First World War, he volunteered for the First Australian Imperial Force and served at Gallipoli in 1915 as the adjutant of an infantry battalion. Later, he served as a staff officer at both brigade and divisional levels on the Western Front between 1916 and 1918, reaching the rank of lieutenant colonel.

Plant remained in the military during the interwar years and undertook various staff and training positions. He completed the staff course at Camberley, and by the start of the Second World War had assumed the role of commandant of the Royal Military College, Duntroon, a position that he held as a brigadier. In July 1940, Plant assumed command of the 24th Brigade and deployed to the Middle East with the Second Australian Imperial Force. Temporarily promoted to major general, he assumed command of the 2nd AIF's rear echelon in the Middle East in mid-1941 before taking command of the 25th Brigade, which he led through the fighting against the Vichy French in Syria and Lebanon.

Following Japan's entry into the war in December 1941, Plant was recalled to Australia to assist with defensive preparations. He was placed in command of the 5th Military District, and later Western Command, assuming control of all Australian forces defending Western Australia. Between 1942 and the end of the war in August 1945, Plant assumed responsibility for support troops in Victoria and Western Australia. He retired from the military in 1946, and died from cancer in 1950 at the age of 60.

== Early life ==
Eric Clive Pegus Plant was born in Charters Towers, Queensland, on 23 April 1890 to English immigrants. His paternal uncle was Edmund Plant, a Queensland politician. He attended Brisbane Grammar School, and developing an interest in military life, became a cadet. This led to his commissioning into the 9th Infantry (Moreton) Regiment, a Citizens Military Force unit, in 1908.

== Military career ==
In 1912, Plant joined the Australian Army, and was attached to the Administrative and Instructional Staff in Victoria as a lieutenant. He would later be assigned to the 15th Light Horse Regiment.

=== First World War ===
Following the outbreak of the First World War, Plant transferred to the Australian Imperial Force (AIF). He was assigned as aide-de-camp to Major General William Bridges, the commander of the AIF, and shipped out to Egypt in October 1914.

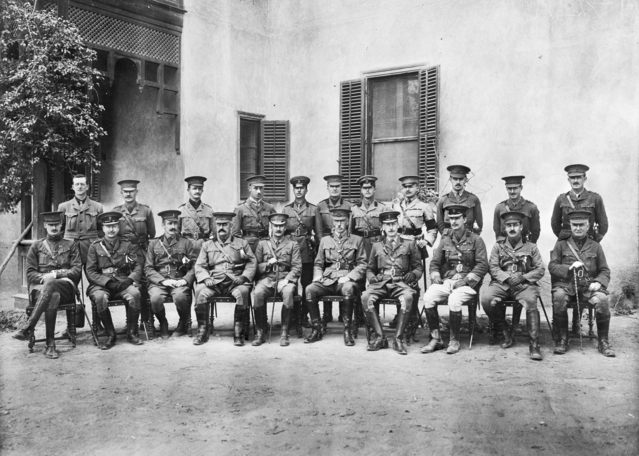
Group portrait of 1st Division staff officers at Mena Camp, December 1914. Plant, then a lieutenant, is stood in the back row, fifth from the right

Plant's duties as aide-de-camp to Major General Bridges ended in March 1915, when Plant was assigned to 9th Battalion as assistant adjutant. He landed with the battalion at Gallipoli on 25 April, advancing as far as 'Third Ridge' with his party of men before being forced to retreat to a safer position for fear of being cut off. Having been promoted to captain following the Gallipoli landings, he was wounded in the hand on 3 June and left Gallipoli for treatment before returning to the battalion over a month later. Later in the campaign he suffered enteric fever, which necessitated his evacuation to England via Malta.

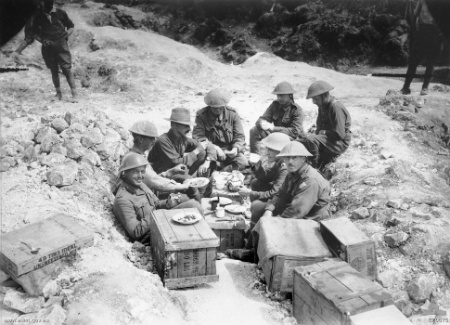
Brigadier General John Gellibrand (wearing a hat) and his staff having breakfast in a shell hole in Sausage Valley, August 1916. Sat on the left, facing the camera, is Eric Plant

Having recovered, Plant was promoted to brigade major in March 1916 and assigned to 6th Brigade, then serving on the Western Front. He worked closely with the brigade commander, Brigadier General John Gellibrand, during the brigade's various actions during 1916 and early 1917, including the Battle of Pozières. For his work, he was awarded the Distinguished Service Order (DSO). He was awarded a Bar to his DSO in 1917 for his leadership during the Second Battle of Bullecourt, in which he rallied straggling infantry under heavy artillery fire. The bar's citation reads:

For conspicuous gallantry and devotion. When acting as Brigade Major he remained on duty continuously for over forty-eight hours, and his gallant work in reorganising broken infantry, and later in rallying stragglers under heavy artillery fire, was invaluable.

From July, he would serve with the headquarters of 4th Division. When the war ended in November 1918, he was transferred to the Repatriation and Demobilization Department of the army. For his wartime service, he was awarded the Croix de guerre and had been mentioned in despatches a total of five times. He was also made an Officer of the Order of the British Empire for his service with the 4th Division.

=== Interwar period ===
Plant, having been made a temporary lieutenant colonel, eventually returned to Australia in July 1920, along with his wife Oona Hunter Brown, whom he had married in London in early 1918. His service with the AIF ended shortly after his return, and he was reduced to his previous rank and transferred to the Staff Corps. After a spell with the Staff College at Camberley, he held a series of staff posts until 1937, at which time he took up the post of director of military training.

=== Second World War ===
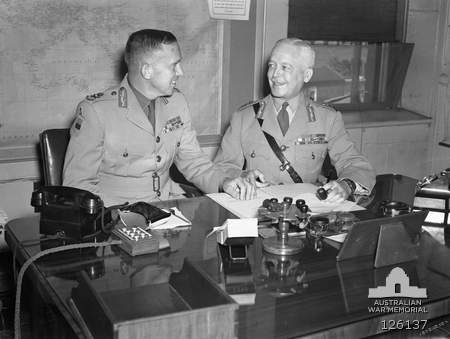
Major General Plant (right) with his replacement as General Officer Commanding, New South Wales Lines of Communication, Lieutenant General Berryman, 4 March 1946

Plant was a temporary brigadier and the commandant of the Royal Military College at Duntroon when the war broke out in September 1939. Put in command of the 24th Brigade, which had been formed in July 1940 and allocated to the 9th Division, he embarked with the Second Australian Imperial Force (2AIF) for the Middle East later that year. In March 1941, the commander of the 2AIF, General Sir Thomas Blamey, promoted Plant to a temporary major general and appointed him commander of the rear echelon area in the Middle East while he himself was supervising the 2AIF forces in the Greece theatre.

On 24 June, Plant, reverting to his previous rank, replaced Brigadier Alfred Baxter-Cox as commander of the 25th Brigade and led it through the remainder of the Syrian Campaign. He earned his sixth mention in despatches for his period in command of the brigade. When the Japanese Empire entered the war, raising fears of a possible Japanese invasion of Australia, he was one of a number of experienced brigadiers recalled to Australia for important positions in the army forces stationed on the home front.

Plant was returned to his temporary rank of major general and appointed commander of the 5th Military District, also referred to as Western Command. This responsibility covered Western Australia. From April 1942, he was responsible for the Line of communication in Victoria and then in New South Wales for the remainder of the war.

== Later life ==
Plant retired from the army in August 1946, with his rank of major general having been substantive. Just before his retirement, he was presented with the insignia of a Companion of the Order of the Bath at Government House in Sydney. In 1947, he was made an Officer of the Order of St. John of Jerusalem. Later in life, he developed cancer and this eventually led to his death on 17 May 1950 in Sydney at the relatively young age of 60. He was survived by his wife and two sons.
