= Albert Fewtrell =

Australian general

- Born: 12 March 1885; Chester, England
- Died: 16 October 1950 (aged 65); Sydney, Australia
- Military career
- Allegiance: Australia
- Branch: Australian Army
- Service years: 1909–1943
- Rank: Major General
- Commands: New South Wales Lines of Communication Area (1942–43); 1st Division (1940–41); 9th Infantry Brigade (1931–38); Royal Engineers, 2nd Division (1926–31); 1st Field Artillery Brigade (1921–26); 7th Field Company (1919); Anzac Light Railway Unit (1916–17); 4th Pioneer Battalion (1916); Australian Mining Corps (1916); 5th Field Company (1914–15)
- Conflicts: First World War; Second World War
- Awards: Companion of the Order of the Bath; Distinguished Service Order; Colonial Auxiliary Forces Officers' Decoration; Mentioned in Despatches (2)

Major General Albert Cecil Fewtrell, CB, DSO, VD (12 March 1885 – 16 October 1950) was an Australian railway engineer and a senior officer in the Australian Army during the Second World War.

Military offices
Preceded by Major General Robert Jackson	General Officer Commanding 1st Division; 1940–1941	Succeeded by Major General Cyril Clowes
