= Bob Hay (general) =

Australian general and rules footballer

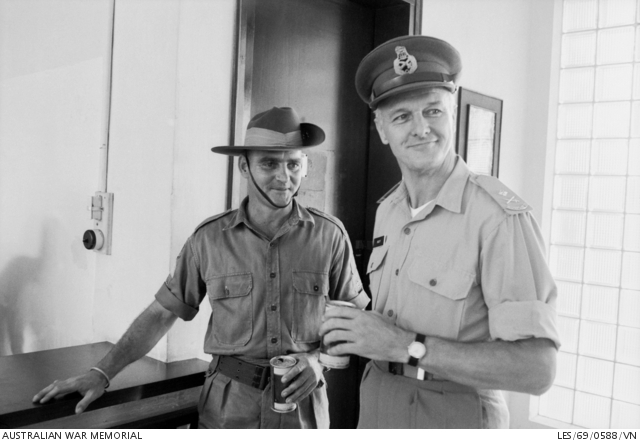
- Hay (right) with Keith Payne at the Australian Force Headquarters in Vietnam, 1969
- Born: 9 April 1920; Bendigo, Victoria
- Died: 28 January 1998 (aged 77); Geelong, Victoria
- Military career
- Allegiance: Australia
- Branch: Australian Army
- Service years: 1937–1977
- Rank: Major General
- Commands: Royal Military College, Duntroon (1973–77); 1st Division (1970); Australian Forces Vietnam (1969–70); Deputy Chief of the General Staff (1967–69); 3rd Battalion, Royal Australian Regiment (1955)
- Conflicts: Second World War; Vietnam War
- Awards: Companion of the Order of the Bath; Member of the Order of the British Empire
Australian rules football career
Personal information
- Original team: Collegians
- Height: 185 cm (6 ft 1 in)
- Weight: 81 kg (179 lb)
Playing career^{1}
| Years | Club | Games (Goals) |
| 1942 | Richmond | 2 (1) |
- ^{1} Playing statistics correct to the end of 1942.

Major General Robert Arthur Hay, CB, MBE (9 April 1920 – 28 January 1998) was an Australian Army general. He also played Australian rules football and made two appearances in 1942 for Richmond in the Victorian Football League (VFL).

Both of Hay's VFL games were finals. He made his debut in Richmond's semi-final win over Essendon at Princes Park and also played in the 1942 VFL Grand Final two weeks later against the same opponent, as a half forward flanker. Richmond lost the grand final by 53 points and Hay never played again for the club.

Hay went on to have a distinguished career in the Australian Army, serving as Commander of Australian Military Forces in Vietnam from 1969 to 1970. He was Commandant of the Royal Military College in Duntroon.

Military offices
| Preceded by Major General Sandy Pearson | Commandant of the Royal Military College, Duntroon; 1973–1977 | Succeeded by Major General Alan Morrison |
| Preceded by Major General Sandy Pearson | Commander 1st Division; April–December 1970 | Succeeded by Major General William Henderson |
| Preceded by Major General Arthur MacDonald | Deputy Chief of the General Staff; 1967–1969 | Succeeded by Major General Stuart Clarence Graham |
