= William Henderson (general) =

Australian general

William George Henderson
- Born: 19 July 1919; Clifton Hill, Victoria
- Died: 10 October 1995 (aged 76)
- Military career
- Allegiance: Australia
- Branch: Australian Army
- Rank: Major General
- Commands: Training Command (1973–76); 1st Division (1971–73); 1st Australian Task Force (1970–71); 2nd Battalion, Royal Australian Regiment (1957–58)
- Conflicts: Second World War; Korean War; Malayan Emergency; Vietnam War
- Awards: Officer of the Order of Australia; Distinguished Service Order; Officer of the Order of the British Empire

Major General William George Henderson, AO, DSO, OBE (19 July 1919 – 10 October 1995) was a senior officer in the Australian Army.

== Biography ==
Born in Clifton Hill, Victoria, on 19 July 1919, Henderson graduated from the Royal Military College, Duntroon in June 1941. An infantryman, he served in the Second World War, Korean War, Malayan Emergency and Vietnam War. He attended Staff College at Cabarlah in 1945 before holding appointments at Western Command in Perth and as Brigade Major (effectively Chief of Staff) of 13th Infantry Brigade, also in Western Australia.

Henderson commanded the 2nd Battalion, Royal Australian Regiment (2 RAR) from November 1957 to November 1958. Later, between June 1970 and February 1971 he served as Commander 1st Australian Task Force (1 ATF) in South Vietnam. He died on 10 October 1995.

== Notes ==
Military offices
Preceded by Major General Robert Hay	Commander 1st Division; 1971–1973	Succeeded by Major General Stuart Graham
