= James Durrant (Australian Army officer) =

Australian general

James Murdoch Archer Durrant
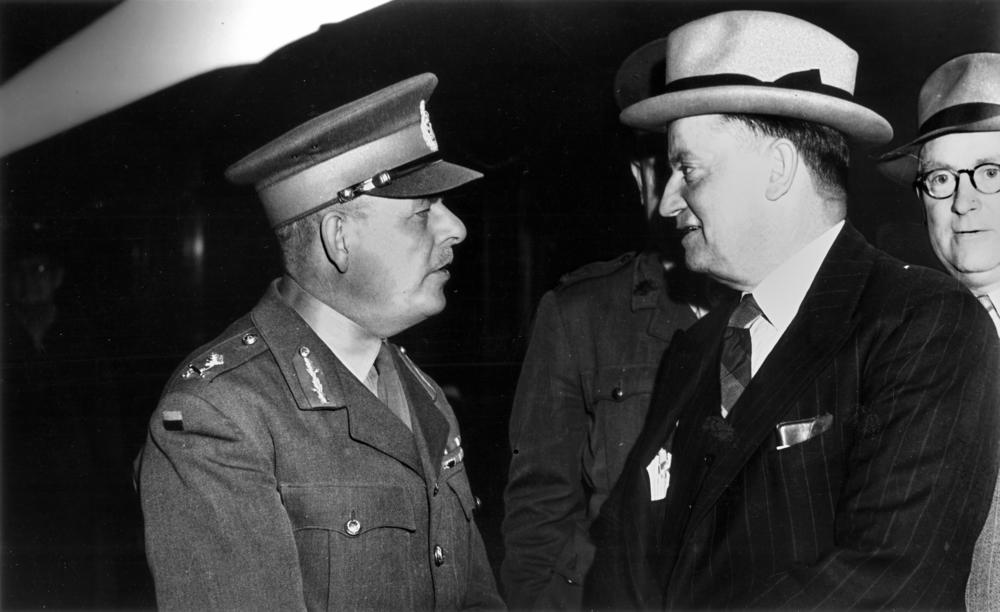
- Major General Durrant (left) with Minister for the Army Frank Forde in Brisbane, 12 October 1941
- Born: 17 March 1885; Glenelg, South Australia
- Died: 17 September 1963 (aged 78)
- Military career
- Allegiance: Australia
- Branch: Australian Army
- Service years: 1907–1944
- Rank: Major General
- Commands: Queensland Lines of Communication Area (1942–44); Northern Command (1941–42); Western Command (1939–41); 5th Military District (1939–41); 5th District Base (1939); 6th District Base (1937–39); 1st District Base (1921–22); 13th Battalion (1916–17)
- Conflicts: First World War; Second World War
- Awards: Companion of the Order of St Michael and St George; Distinguished Service Order; Mentioned in Despatches (5); Officer of the Order of the White Eagle (Serbia)

Major General James Murdoch Archer Durrant, CMG, DSO (17 March 1885 – 17 September 1963) was a senior officer in the Australian Army.

Durrant was born in Glenelg, South Australia and enlisted on 1 July 1907 at Lawley, South Australia, service number QP20006. He was appointed captain in the 13th Battalion on 20 December 1914, major on 2 May 1915 and lieutenant colonel on 20 August 1916. On 1 October 1919 he was Staff Officer in charge Repatriation and Demobilisation Department.

In 1939 Durrant was District Officer Commanding 5th Military District and in 1942 he was General Officer Commanding Queensland Lines of Communication Area. He was discharged 5 April 1944.
