= John Hardie (general) =

Australian general

John Leslie Hardie
- Born: 20 March 1882; Ballarat, Victoria
- Died: 21 July 1956 (aged 74); Concord, New South Wales
- Military career
- Allegiance: Australia
- Branch: Australian Army
- Service years: 1903–1942
- Rank: Major General
- Nickname: Bull
- Commands: 1st Division (1935–39); 2nd Military District (1935–39); 4th Military District (1931–35)
- Conflicts: First World War; Second Battle of Bullecourt; Battle of Menin Road; Battle of Broodseinde; Second World War
- Awards: Distinguished Service Order; Officer of the Order of the British Empire; Mentioned in Despatches (2)

Major General John Leslie Hardie, DSO, OBE (20 March 1882 – 21 July 1956) was an Australian general who served during First and Second World Wars. As a brigade major, Hardie earned the Distinguished Service Order and was later appointed an Officer of the Order of the British Empire for his services as a deputy assistant adjutant general.

== Early life ==
John Leslie Hardie was born on 20 March 1882 in Ballarat, Victoria, Australia. He was the eldest of six children born to John Hardie, a draper and Anne Hardie, née Reddall, an Englishwoman. He graduated from Hawthorn Secondary College and attended the University of Melbourne where he studied medicine. He did not complete his studies and instead joined the Australian Army. He married Lena Elizabeth Wentworth at the Holy Trinity Church in Melbourne on 16 June 1910, and they had one son.

== Military service ==
Hardie was commissioned as a lieutenant in the 6th Australian Infantry Regiment in July 1903. On 1 May 1909 he was appointed to the Administrative and Instructional Staff of the Australian Military Forces. He was promoted to captain in 1911 and served as a general staff officer until 1913, and after the outbreak of war was appointed as deputy assistant adjutant general in South Australia until his promotion to major in June 1916. He was appointed to the Australian Imperial Force on 9 December and was sent to France ten days later. He served as a brigade major for the 1st Australian Infantry Brigade, 1st Division. He served with distinction at the Second Battle of Bullecourt in May 1917, part of the Battle of Arras, where his brigade was tasked with digging a 1,097 metres (1,200 yards) long communication trench for the 2nd Division's attacking forces. The brigade then took part in the battle and the following German counter-offensive. In September, Hardie participated in the Battle of Menin Road, part of the Battle of Passchendaele. For his actions he was awarded the Distinguished Service Order.

On 1 April 1918 he was appointed as the deputy assistant adjutant general for 1st Division Headquarters where he served until April 1919 when he was shipped back to Australia. He was appointed Officer of the Order of the British Empire in June 1919 for his administrative accomplishments during and after the war as a deputy assistant adjutant general. He resumed his duties with the Australian Army Reserve in South Australia and was later transferred to the Staff Corps in October 1920 and held numerous senior positions over the following two decades. He was promoted to major general in 1937 and advocated the recruitment of militia as the situation deteriorated in Europe. With the outbreak of the Second World War, Hardie was appointed as inspector general of the Department of Defence Co-ordination from 1939 to 1940, and as inspector of administration at Army Headquarters from 1940 until his retirement on 10 March 1942.

== Later years ==
Hardie was a vice president of, and an active worker for, St John Ambulance. He was also a commandant general in the Corps of Commissionaires, a British security firm with offices in Australia. On 21 July 1956, Hardie died of Parkinson's disease at the Concord Repatriation General Hospital in Sydney, and was cremated. He was survived by his wife and son.

== Sources ==
- Australian National University. "Hardie, John Leslie (1882–1956)." Australian Dictionary of Biography Online. http://adbonline.anu.edu.au/biogs/A090190b.htm (accessed 5 June 2011).
