= 1st Division (Australia) =

One of two divisions of the Australian Army

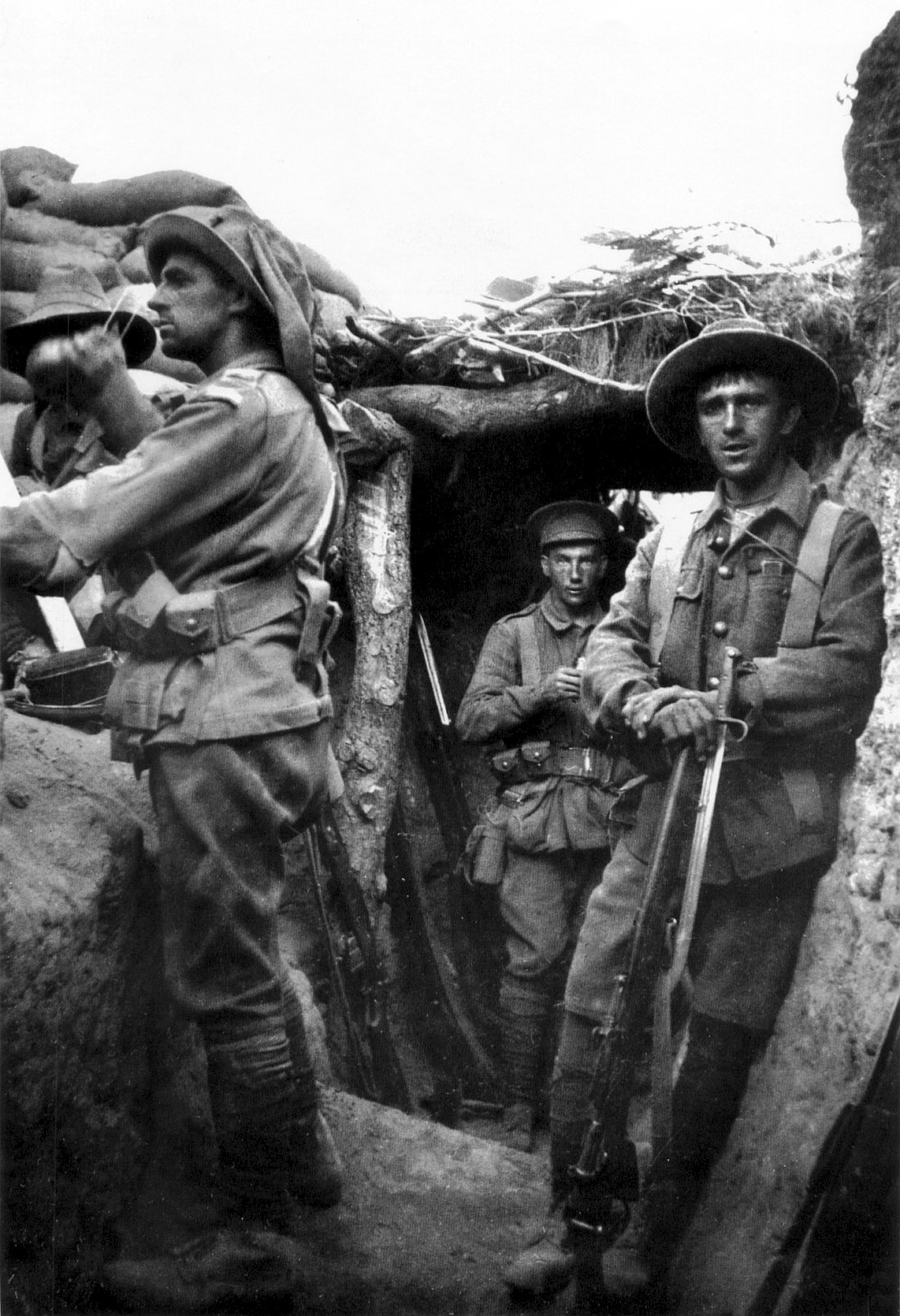
- Members of the 7th Battalion in a trench at Lone Pine, 6 August 1915
- Active: 1914–1919; 1921–1945; 1960–present
- Country: Australia
- Branch: Australian Army
- Type: Division
- Role: Main deployment force
- Garrison/HQ: Brisbane, Queensland
- Engagements: First World War: Gallipoli campaign; Western Front; Second World War

Commanders
- Current commander: Major General Ash Collingburn
- Notable commanders: William Bridges; James Legge; Talbot Hobbs; Harry Chauvel; William Glasgow; Herbert Lloyd; Peter Cosgrove

Insignia
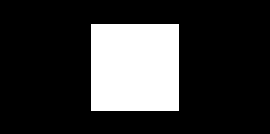
- Unit colour patch

The 1st Division, also known as the 1st (Australian) Division, is a division headquartered in Enoggera Barracks in Brisbane. The division was first formed in 1914 for service during the First World War as a part of the Australian Imperial Force (AIF). It was initially part of the Australian and New Zealand Army Corps (ANZAC) and served with that formation during the Gallipoli campaign, before later serving on the Western Front. After the war, the division became a part-time unit based in New South Wales. During the Second World War it undertook defensive duties in Australia. It was disbanded in 1945.

After the Second World War, the division remained off the Australian Army's order of battle until the 1960s, when it was reformed in New South Wales. In 1965 it adopted a certification role, determining the operational readiness of units deploying to Vietnam. It was re-formed in 1973 as a full division based in Queensland and in the decades that followed it formed the Australian Army's main formation, including both Regular and Reserve personnel. Throughout this period, the division's component units undertook multiple operations, mainly focused on peacekeeping in Africa, Asia and the Middle East.

Following the restructuring of the Australian Army under the "Adaptive Army" initiative, the 1st Division no longer had any combat units assigned to it, although the 2nd Battalion, Royal Australian Regiment became a direct command unit in late 2017. In 2023 the Army's three regular combat brigades were assigned to the 1st Division, which subsequently also gained a logistics brigade and an artillery brigade. The division is tasked with co-ordinating the Army's high-level training activities and maintaining the "Deployable Joint Force Headquarters" (DJFHQ). In the event of the Australian Army undertaking a large-scale land-based operation, the division would have further combat units force assigned to it and would command all deployed assets including those of the Royal Australian Navy and the Royal Australian Air Force.

== History ==
=== First World War ===
==== Gallipoli ====
The Australian 1st Division was raised during the initial formation of the Australian Imperial Force (AIF) on 15 August 1914, shortly after the outbreak of the First World War. The division consisted of around 18,000 men, organised into three infantry brigades, each of four battalions, and various supporting units including artillery, light horse, engineers and medical personnel. Each infantry battalion initially consisted of eight companies, although in January 1915, they were reorganised into the British four-company system. Its first commander was the senior Australian general and head of the AIF, Major General William Bridges. Over the course of six weeks, the division's subordinate units were raised separately in the various states before embarking overseas. The transports then concentrated off the Western Australian coast and the combined fleet sailed for Britain. While en route, concerns about overcrowding in the training camps in the United Kingdom meant that the decision was made to land the division in Egypt, where it would complete its training before being transported to the Western Front.

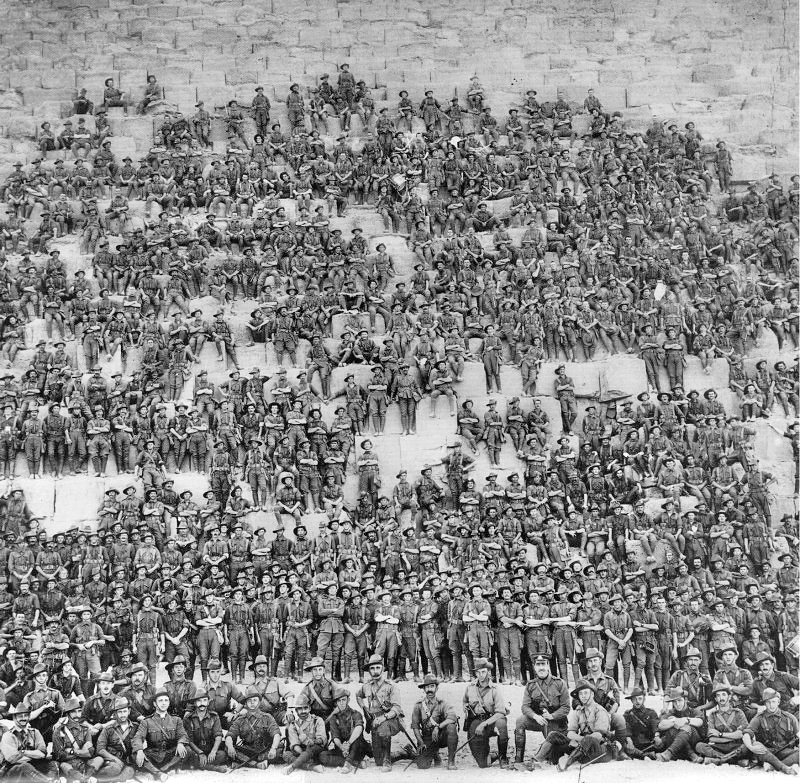
The 11th Battalion posing on the Great Pyramid of Giza, 1915.

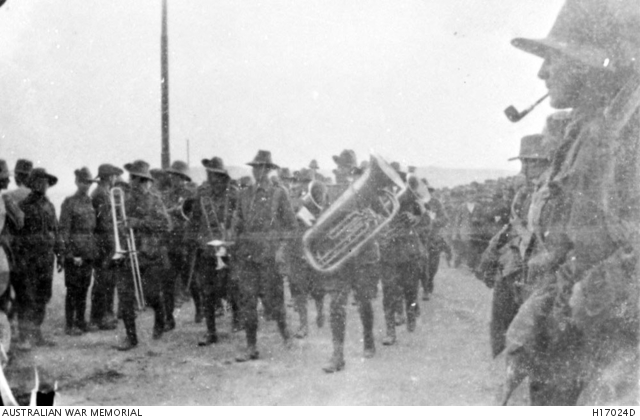
Men of the 3rd Infantry Brigade, AIF, leaving their camp at Mena, Egypt, bound for Lemnos on their way to Gallipoli, February 1915.

While in Egypt, the division was assigned to the Australian and New Zealand Army Corps along with the New Zealand and Australian Division. Following the Allied decision to force a passage through the Dardanelles, the division was allocated to take part in a landing on the Gallipoli peninsula along with Anglo-French forces. The 1st Division made the initial landing at Anzac Cove on 25 April 1915. The 3rd Brigade formed the covering force which landed first, around dawn. The 1st and 2nd Brigades followed, landing from transports, and all were ashore by 9:00 am. While the landing was lightly opposed on the beach by elements of a single Turkish battalion, the Australians were checked short of their objectives as Turkish reinforcements arrived to secure the high ground around Chunuk Bair and Sari Bair. Critical fights developed on the left, over the hill known as Baby 700, and on the right on 400 Plateau, but stalemate set in and little further progress would be made for the remaining eight months of the campaign.

On 15 May 1915, after Bridges was mortally wounded by a sniper, an English officer, Brigadier General Harold Walker was given temporary command while a replacement was dispatched from Australia. This was Colonel James Legge, the Australian Chief of the General Staff, who was not an immediately popular choice with either his corps commander, Lieutenant General William Birdwood, or his subordinate brigade commanders. That same month, the division's artillery – three field artillery brigades each operating twelve 18-pound pieces, which had proved inadequate in the early battle, was boosted by the arrival of several Japanese-made trench mortars. They were later joined by several heavier guns including a 4.7-inch gun and two 6-inch howitzers. On 24 June, Legge replaced Walker, who returned to command of the 1st Brigade, but after Legge was evacuated from Gallipoli he was moved sideways to command of the newly formed Australian 2nd Division and Walker resumed command of the 1st Division.

The 1st Division's role in the August Offensive was to hold the front line and conduct a diversion on 400 Plateau at Lone Pine on 6 August. The resulting battle was the only occasion when a significant length of the Turkish trench line was captured, but resulted in heavy casualties. The main assault was made by the 1st Brigade, which was later reinforced by the 7th and 12th Battalions. Out of an assault force of 2,900 men, 1,700 were killed or wounded. On 7 August, the 6th Battalion from the 2nd Brigade made an unsuccessful attempt to capture the German Officers' Trench as a preliminary operation to other assaults by light horsemen at Quinn's Post and the Nek.

In October, Walker was severely wounded and replaced by the division's artillery commander, Brigadier General Talbot Hobbs who in turn fell ill and was replaced on 6 November by the commander of the Australian 1st Light Horse Brigade, Brigadier General Harry Chauvel. The 1st Division was evacuated from the peninsula in December, returning to Egypt. During the early months of 1916 the AIF underwent a period of re-organisation and expansion, and the division's experienced personnel were used to provide cadre staff to the newly formed 4th and 5th Divisions before being brought back up to strength in preparation for deployment to the Western Front. On 14 March, Walker, having recovered from his wounds, resumed command of the division, now part of I Anzac Corps. Seven members of the division received the Victoria Cross for their actions during the campaign: Alexander Burton, William Dunstan, Frederick Tubb, Patrick Hamilton, Leonard Keysor, Alfred Shout, William Symons.

==== Somme, 1916 ====
After reorganising in Egypt, where it was briefly employed to defend the Suez Canal against an Ottoman attack that never came, the 1st Division was transferred to France in mid-March. Arriving in Marseille, they were moved by train to northern France where it was initially sent to a quiet sector south of Armentières to acclimatise to the Western Front conditions. The division was not considered ready to be committed to the fighting at the start of the offensive on the Somme in early July, but as it dragged on I Anzac was sent to join the British Reserve Army of Lieutenant General Hubert Gough who intended to use the Australian divisions to take the village of Pozières. Walker resisted Gough's efforts to throw the 1st Division into battle unprepared, insisting on careful preparation. When the 1st Division attacked shortly after midnight on 23 July, it succeeded in capturing half of the village but failed to make progress in the neighbouring German trench system. After enduring a heavy German bombardment, far surpassing anything yet experienced by an Australian unit, the 1st Division was withdrawn, having suffered 5,285 casualties, and was replaced by the Australian 2nd Division.

The division's respite was brief as in mid-August, with its battalions restored to about two-thirds strength, it returned to the line on Pozières Ridge, relieving the Australian 4th Division and continuing the slow progress towards Mouquet Farm. On 22 August, having lost another 2,650 men, the division was once again relieved by the 2nd Division. The division rotated through the line, conducting patrols and raids until 5 September when I Anzac Corps was withdrawn from the Somme and sent to Ypres for rest. The division anticipated spending winter quarters in Flanders but was recalled to the Somme for the final stages of the British offensive. This time they joined the British Fourth Army, holding a sector south of Pozières near the village of Flers. The battlefield had been reduced to a slough of mud but the 1st Division was required to mount a number of attacks around Gueudecourt during the Battle of Le Transloy; all ended in failure which was inevitable in the conditions.

==== German withdrawal to the Hindenburg Line, 1917 ====
Starting on 24 February 1917, the 1st Division took part in the pursuit of the German forces as they retreated to their prepared fortifications in the Hindenburg Line. The division advanced against the German screen towards Bapaume and, on the night of 26 February, the 3rd Brigade captured the villages of Le Barque and Ligny-Thilloy. On the morning of 2 March, they withstood a German attempt to retake the villages. The 1st Division was then withdrawn to rest, joining the 4th Division. I Anzac's pursuit was carried on by the 2nd and 5th Divisions.

By April, the 1st Division (and I Anzac Corps) was once again part of Gough's Fifth Army (formerly the Reserve Army). On 9 April – the day the British launched the Battle of Arras – the 1st Division captured the last three villages (Hermies, Boursies and Demicourt) used by the Germans as outposts of the Hindenburg Line, thereby bringing the British line in striking distance of the main Hindenburg defences. This action cost the division 649 casualties. For actions during the fighting at Boursies, Captain James Newland and Sergeant John Whittle, both of the 12th Battalion (3rd Brigade), were awarded the Victoria Cross.

==== Hindenburg Line, 1917 ====
The 1st Division was in support during the First Battle of Bullecourt which was the Fifth Army's main contribution to the Arras offensive. Once the first attempt on Bullecourt had failed, British attention concentrated on Arras and the Fifth Army's front was stretched thin with the 1st Division having to cover more than 12,000 yards (11,000 m).

The Germans, well aware of the vulnerable state of the British defences, launched a counter-stroke on 15 April (the Battle of Lagnicourt). The Germans attacked with 23 battalions against four Australian battalions. The German plan was to drive back the advanced posts, destroy supplies and guns and then retire to the Hindenburg defences. However, despite their numerical superiority, the Germans were unable to penetrate the Australian line. The 1st Division's artillery batteries in front of Lagnicourt were overrun and the village was occupied for two hours but counter-attacks from the Australian 9th and 20th Battalions (the latter from the 2nd Division) drove the Germans out. In this action the Australians suffered 1,010 casualties, mainly in the 1st Division, against 2,313 German casualties. Only five artillery guns were damaged.

On 3 May the Second Battle of Bullecourt commenced. Initially the 1st Division in reserve but it was drawn into the fighting on the second day when the 1st Brigade was detached to support the 2nd Division's attack. The Australians seized a foothold in the Hindenburg Line which over the following days was slowly expanded. By 6 May, they had captured over 1,000 yards (910 m) of the German trenchline, and the 3rd Brigade had also been committed. The German attempts to drive the British from their gains finally ceased on 17 May and the 1st Division was withdrawn for an extended rest, having suffered 2,341 casualties.

==== Third Battle of Ypres ====
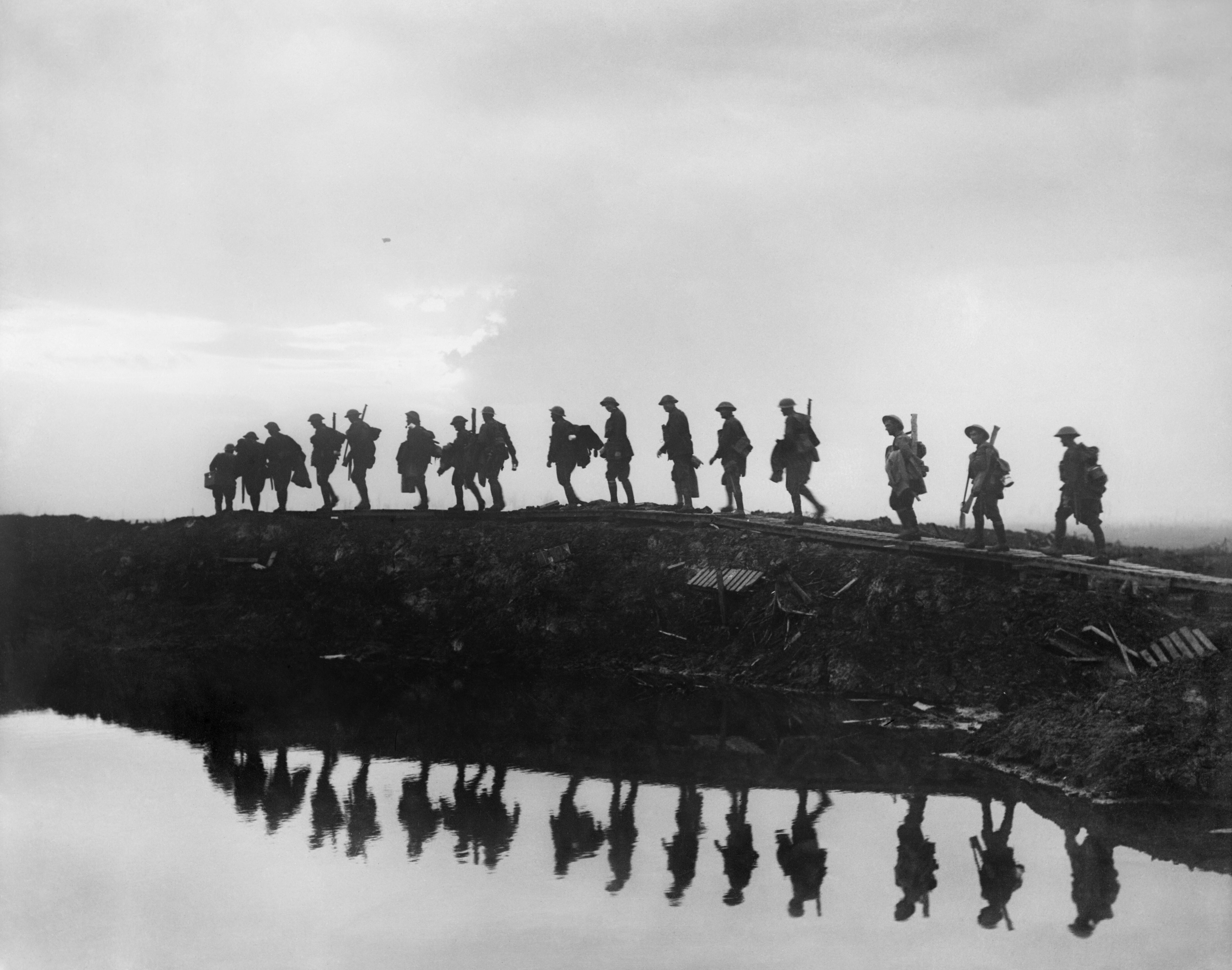
Soldiers from the 1st Division at Hooge, 5 October 1917

The 1st Division's artillery was in action from the start of the Third Battle of Ypres on 31 July 1917 but the infantry were not called upon until the second phase of the battle commenced on 20 September with the Battle of Menin Road. Attacking across 1,000-metre (1,100 yd) front, along with ten other divisions, including the Australian 2nd Division on their left, the 1st Division captured around 1,500 metres (1,600 yd) of ground, securing Glencorse Wood and gaining a foothold in Polygon Wood. The Australian divisions suffered 5,000 casualties from the battle – the 1st Division lost 2,754 men – mainly due to retaliatory shelling from heavy artillery after the advance had completed.

The 1st Division was relieved by the Australian 5th Division before the next assault, the Battle of Polygon Wood (26 September), but in turn took up the advance for the following Battle of Broodseinde (4 October), the third and final of the successful bite-and-hold attacks conceived by General Herbert Plumer of the British Second Army. This battle marked the peak of British success during 3rd Ypres and apart from minor roles on the southern flank of the Canadian Corps during the Battle of Poelcappelle, First Battle of Passchendaele and the Second Battle of Passchendaele, it was the end of the 1st Division's involvement. The division's casualties were 2,448 men killed or wounded.

==== Hazebrouck ====
The Australians wintered in Flanders, engaging in vigorous patrolling and raiding. The 1st Division was still at Messines when the Germans launched their final offensive starting on the Somme with Operation Michael on 21 March 1918. In the first week of April, the 1st Division, along with the 2nd, began moving to the Somme when, on 9 April, the Germans launched Operation Georgette; an attack north and south of Armentières followed by a swift drive towards the vital rail junction of Hazebrouck.

The 1st Division, having reached Amiens and about to join up with the Australian Corps, was ordered to turn around and hurry back north. Hazebrouck was reached on 12 April, just in time to relieve the exhausted British divisions. Holding a line 5 miles (8.0 km) east of the town, the 1st Division helped halt the German advance on 13 April (the Battle of Hazebrouck) and then repulsed a renewed offensive on 17 April after which the Germans abandoned their push, concentrating instead on the high ground west of Messines.

The division remained active in Flanders from May to July, engaging in a process of informal but carefully planned raiding known as peaceful penetration. Their greatest success came on 11 July when they took 1,000 yards (910 m) of front, 120 prisoners and 11 machine guns from the German 13th Reserve Division. This unrelenting pressure had a severe impact on German morale.

==== Hundred Days, 1918 ====
The 1st Division returned to the Australian Corps on 8 August 1918, the day on which the final British offensive commenced with the Battle of Amiens. The division was sent into action the following day, relieving the 5th Division, but arrived late due to its rushed preparation. The 1st Division continued the attack for the next three days, driving towards Lihons, but progress was slow as the Australians moved beyond their supporting guns and tanks.

On 23 August the 1st Division attacked south of the River Somme towards Chuignes with the British 32nd Division on its southern flank attacking Herleville. The Australians suffered 1,000 casualties but took 2,000 German prisoners out of a total of 8,000 captured by both the British Third and Fourth Armies on that day. The 1st also captured a German 15-in naval gun. On 18 September, despite being severely depleted – only 2,854 infantrymen out of division's 12,204 nominal strength were available – the 1st Division took part in the assault on the Hindenburg "Outpost" Line during the Battle of Épehy, capturing a large section of the line.

After this, the division was withdrawn from the line. They would take no further part in the fighting, having lost 677 men in their final battle. In early October, the rest of the Australian Corps, severely depleted due to heavy casualties and falling enlistments in Australia, was also withdrawn upon a request made by Prime Minister Billy Hughes, to re-organise in preparation for further operations. On 11 November, an armistice came into effect, and as hostilities came to an end, the division's personnel were slowly repatriated back to Australia for demobilisation and discharge. This was completed by 23 March 1919, when the division was disbanded. Throughout the course of the war, the division suffered losses of around 15,000 men killed and 35,000 wounded, out of the 80,000 men that served in its ranks.

In commemoration of its war dead, the division built a memorial a stone obelisk memorial at Pozières, as the division lost more casualties there than any other battle (7,654 casualties in six weeks). The memorial lists the division's main battles as: Pozières, Mouquet Farm, Le Barque, Thilloy, Boursies, Demicourt, Hermies, Lagnicourt, Bullecourt, Third Ypres, Menin Road, Broodseinde Ridge, Poelcapelle, Second Passchendaele, Hazebrouck, Second Somme, Lihons, Chuignolles, Hindenburg Line and Épehy.

=== Inter war years ===
In 1921, after the AIF was disbanded, the part-time Citizens Forces was re-organised to adopt the numerical designations of the AIF. Thus the 1st Division was re-raised as a reserve formation, initially under the command of Colonel Charles Brand, composed primarily of infantry units based in New South Wales and Queensland. During the inter-war years, the assignment of battalions to brigades and divisions varied considerably within the Army and as a result the 1st Division's composition was changed a number of times; its initial order of battle included three infantry brigades – the 1st, 7th and 8th – each of four infantry battalions, and various supporting elements including engineers, field ambulance, artillery, signals, transport, medical, veterinarians and service corps troops. The division was based headquartered at Burwood, New South Wales.

=== Second World War ===
Upon the outbreak of Second World War the 1st Division consisted of two infantry brigades – the 1st and 8th – as well as two field artillery regiments, one medium artillery regiment and two engineer field companies. At this stage the division was partly mobilised, although as the provisions of the Defence Act (1903) precluded the deployment of the Militia to fight outside of Australian territory, it was decided to raise an all volunteer force for overseas service. This force was known as the Second Australian Imperial Force, and initially about a quarter of its soldiers were drawn from the Citizens Military Forces. After fighting broke out in the Pacific, however, in December 1941 members of the Militia were prevented from joining the AIF and were called up for full-time service to bolster defences in Australia in an effort to counter the possibility of attacks by Japanese land forces against the Australian mainland. Later a number of Militia formations took part in the fighting against the Japanese in the Pacific, notably in New Guinea and Borneo, however, the 1st Division remained in Australia throughout the war. Based in New South Wales, the division formed part of the Port Kembla Covering Force during the early stages of the Pacific War and in March 1942 became part of the II Corps, First Army.

During this time the division's composition changed numerous times as many of its subordinate units were transferred. Shortly after mobilisation the division lost its engineer field companies and in June 1940 the three artillery regiments assigned to the division were also transferred out, to be replaced by a light horse regiment which had been converted to the machine gun role although this too was later removed from the division's order of battle. In mid-1942, the division's headquarters staff were transferred along with their commander, Major General Cyril Clowes, to Milne Force, which later took part in the Battle of Milne Bay. Later the division was transferred to the Second Army. By April 1943, the division consisted of the 1st, 9th and 28th Brigades, and was headquartered in Parramatta. As manpower restrictions in the Australian economy forced the early demobilisation of large numbers of men, the majority of which came from infantry units in Australia that were not involved in fighting overseas. The 1st Division was one of these units and by January 1945, when the 2nd Brigade was disbanded, the division consisted of only one infantry brigade, the 1st. The division was officially disbanded on 6 April 1945.

=== Post Second World War ===
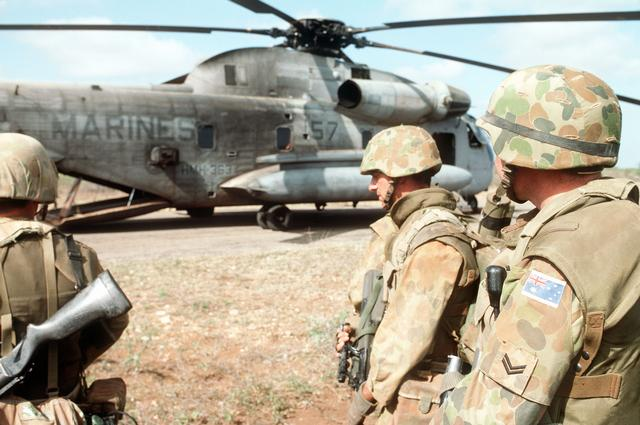
1RAR soldiers prepare to board a United States Marine Corps helicopter in Somalia

After the Second World War, the Australian military was demobilised. By 1948 this process had been completed and a period of reorganisation began. This resulted in the establishment of a Regular infantry force consisting of a single brigade and two divisions of part-time soldiers in the Citizens Military Force (CMF). There was no room within this structure for the 1st Division and as a result it remained off the Australian Army's order of battle until 1960, when its headquarters was reformed in Sydney, following the implementation of the Pentropic divisional structure, commanding all Army units – Regular and CMF – in New South Wales. It was also responsible for training some CMF units in other states.

In 1965, the Pentropic structure was abolished and the divisional headquarters' was tasked with determining the readiness of units deploying to Vietnam. It fulfilled this role until Australia's commitment to the conflict ended in late 1972. In November the following year, the division was established at Enoggera Barracks in Brisbane, Queensland, and was re-formed as the Australian Army's "main striking force". Throughout the Cold War era, the division grew into a formation of over 13,000 personnel, which, at its peak in the early 2000s consisted of four brigades: two Regular, one integrated and one Reserve spread across Queensland, New South Wales and the Northern Territory. In 1997, the formation's headquarters assumed the additional task of raising a deployable joint force headquarters, tasked with commanding Army, Royal Australian Air Force and Royal Australian Navy assets during large-scale operations.

During this time, the division was not deployed as a complete formation, although its elements undertook numerous operations. These include peacekeeping operations in Namibia, Western Sahara, Cambodia, Somalia, Rwanda, East Timor, and the Solomon Islands. The division also deployed personnel to Iraq as part of Operation Catalyst and to Afghanistan as part of Operation Slipper.

== Present ==
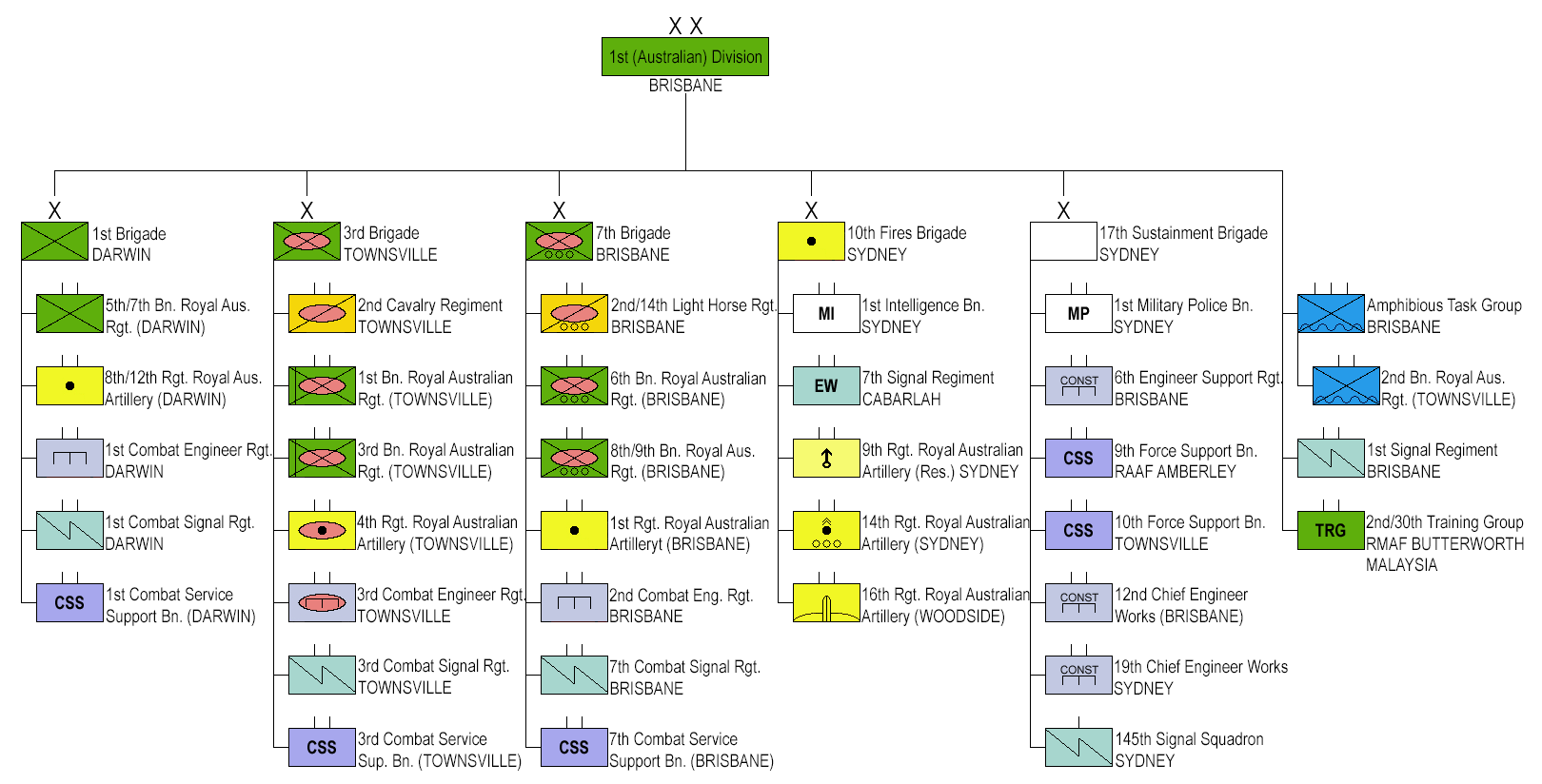
1st (Australian) Division organization 2025

Following the establishment of Forces Command, in 2009, and the implementation of the "Adaptive Army" initiative it was decided that no combat units would be directly assigned to the 1st Division on a permanent basis. Instead, it was decided that all combat forces would be assigned to Forces Command and the Headquarters 1st Division would provide a command and control function for "high-level training activities", during which activities combat units would be force assigned to the division. It was also tasked with commanding "large scale ground operations" and, at the behest of Headquarters Joint Operations Command (HQJOC), the divisional headquarters was tasked with forming the "Deployable Joint Force Headquarters (DJFHQ)", responsible for commanding all deployed forces including those of the Royal Australian Navy and Royal Australian Air Force.

As of mid-October 2017, the 2nd Battalion, Royal Australian Regiment became a direct command unit of headquarters of the 1st Division, serving as a specialist amphibious warfare unit. The unit remains based at Lavarack Barracks in Townsville.

Effective 1 July 2023, the division was renamed the 1st (Australian) Division. The 1st, 3rd and 7th Brigades were also placed under the direct control of the division's headquarters. This reform aimed to improve the connections between the divisional headquarters and the brigades it commands during deployments. The 17th Sustainment Brigade was transferred to the 1st Division on 5 November 2024. In December 2024 the 1st Intelligence Battalion and 7th Signal Regiment were temporarily assigned to the direct command of the 1st Division's headquarters when the 6th Brigade was disbanded. These two units will be transferred to the 10th Brigade after it is re-raised.

== Commanding generals ==
Date commenced	Date ended	Commander
26 October 1914	15 May 1915	Major General William Bridges CMG
15 May 1915	22 June 1915	Brigadier General Harold Walker DSO
22 June 1915	26 July 1915	Major General James Legge CMG
26 July 1915	13 October 1915	Brigadier General Harold Walker DSO
13 October 1915	6 November 1915	Brigadier General Talbot Hobbs
6 November 1915	14 March 1916	Major General Harry Chauvel CB, CMG
14 March 1916	31 May 1918	Major General Sir Harold Walker KCB, DSO
30 June 1918	6 May 1919	Major General Sir Thomas Glasgow KCB, CMG, DSO
1 May 1921	31 December 1925	Major General Charles Brand CB, CMG, DSO
1 January 1926	31 May 1927	Major General Julius Bruche CB, CMG
1 June 1927	5 April 1929	Brigadier General Thomas Dodds CMG, CVO, DSO
23 July 1929	30 November 1931	Brigadier Francis Heritage CBE, MVO
16 January 1932	31 January 1933	Brigadier James Corlette CMG, DSO, VD
1 February 1933	10 July 1934	Brigadier General Owen Phillips CMG, DSO
24 August 1934	1 June 1935	Brigadier Edward Norrie DSO, VD
1 June 1935	5 November 1939	Major General John Hardie DSO, OBE
5 November 1939	1 May 1940	Major General Robert Jackson CMG, DSO
2 May 1940	6 January 1941	Major General Albert Fewtrell DSO
7 January 1942	31 July 1942	Major General Cyril Clowes DSO, MC
1 August 1942	21 September 1943	Major General Francis Derham DSO
22 September 1943	7 May 1945	Major General Herbert Lloyd CB, CMG, CVO, DSO
12 December 1960	30 November 1963	Major General Ian Murdoch CBE
1 December 1963	8 May 1966	Major General John Andersen CBE
8 May 1966	13 January 1967	Major General Douglas Vincent OBE
24 May 1967	16 December 1968	Major General Kenneth Mackay MBE
30 January 1969	20 August 1969	Brigadier Stuart Weir MC (Acting)
13 October 1969	28 February 1970	Major General Cedric Pearson DSO, OBE, MC
20 April 1970	6 December 1970	Major General Robert Hay CB, MBE
5 April 1971	31 October 1973	Major General William Henderson DSO, OBE
1 November 1973	February 1974	Major General Stuart Graham DSO, OBE, MC
13 February 1974	1975	Major General Ronald Hughes CBE, DSO
February 1975	March 1977	Major General Bruce McDonald DSO, OBE, MC
21 March 1977	3 June 1979	Major General Phillip Bennett DSO
June 1979	March 1981	Major General John Kelly DSO
March 1981	March 1984	Major General David Drabsch AO, MBE
March 1984	March 1985	Major General Adrian Clunies-Ross MBE
March 1985	March 1988	Major General Michael Jeffery AO, MC
March 1988	January 1991	Major General Arthur Fittock AO
January 1991	June 1994	Major General Peter Arnison AO
June 1994	February 1996	Major General Michael Keating AM
February 1996	March 1998	Major General Tim Ford
March 1998	November 1999	Major General Peter Cosgrove AM, MC
November 1999	July 2002	Major General Jim Molan AO
July 2002	April 2004	Major General Mark Evans DSC, AM
April 2004	July 2005	Major General Mark Kelly AM
2 July 2005	6 July 2007	Major General Ash Power AM, CSC
6 July 2007	2009	Major General Richard Wilson AO
2009	22 February 2011	Major General Michael Slater DSC, AM, CSC
22 February 2011	31 October 2012	Major General Rick Burr DSC, AM, MVO
31 October 2012	November 2015	Major General Stuart Smith AO, DSC
November 2015	5 December 2018	Major General Paul McLachlan AO, CSC
6 December 2018	30 November 2021	Major General Jake Ellwood DSC, AM
30 November 2021	12 December 2023	Major General Scott Winter AM
12 December 2023	Incumbent	Major General Ash Collingburn AM, DSM

== See also ==
- 1916 Pioneer Exhibition Game
