= 5th Military District (Australia) =

Former administrative district of the Australian Army

Coordinates: 31°56′56″S 115°51′44″E

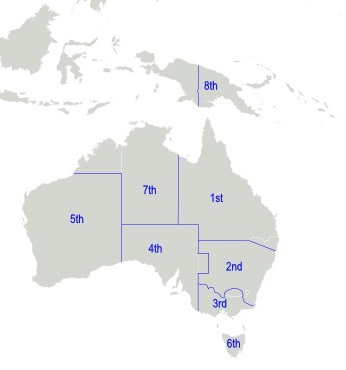
Australian military districts, October 1939

The 5th Military District was an administrative district of the Australian Army. Formed shortly after the Federation of Australia, the 5th Military District covered all of Western Australia except the Kimberley region, with its headquarters at Swan Barracks in Perth. Following World War I, the area's designation was changed to the 5th District Base. In October 1939, it was re-designated as Western Command when the Army moved towards a geographic command structure. In April 1942, the Army was reorganised and Western Command became III Corps in April 1942.

Western Command was re-formed in June 1944 when the need for a corps-level headquarters passed.

Then-Captain William Henderson, later promoted to Major General, served on the command's staff soon after the Second World War ended. The 13th Infantry Brigade was re-raised in 1948, once again headquartered in Western Australia, and assigned to Western Command. Upon formation, it consisted of two infantry battalions: the 11th/44th and the 16th/28th. In 1960, when the CMF was reorganised following the adoption of the Pentropic divisional establishment, the brigade was disbanded.

The geographical command structure was retained until the 1970s.

== Sources ==
- Clark, Chris (2020). "William George (Bill) Henderson (1919–1995)". Australian Dictionary of Biography. Vol. 19. National Centre of Biography, Australian National University. ISBN 978-0-522-84459-7. ISSN 1833-7538. OCLC 70677943.
- Dennis, Peter; Grey, Jeffrey; Morris, Ewan; Prior, Robin (1995). The Oxford Companion to Australian Military History (1st ed.). Melbourne: Oxford University Press. ISBN 0-19-553227-9.
- McKenzie-Smith, Graham (2018). The Unit Guide: The Australian Army 1939–1945, Volume 2. Warriewood, New South Wales: Big Sky Publishing. ISBN 978-1-925675-146.
- Palazzo, Albert (2001). The Australian Army: A History of Its Organisation 1901–2001. South Melbourne, Victoria: Oxford University Press. ISBN 0-19-551506-4.
- Shaw, Peter (2010). "The Evolution of the Infantry State Regiment System in the Army Reserve". Sabretache. LI (4 (December)). Garran, Australian Capital Territory: Military Historical Society of Australia: 5–12. ISSN 0048-8933.
