= Michael Slater (general) =

Senior officer in the Australian Army

Michael David Slater
- Born: 8 July 1958 (age 68); Brisbane, Queensland
- Military career
- Allegiance: Australia
- Branch: Australian Army
- Service years: 1978–2015
- Rank: Major General
- Commands: Forces Command (2011–15); Floods Recovery (2011); 1st Division (2009–11); Joint Task Force 630 (2006); 3rd Brigade (2004–06); 2nd Battalion, Royal Australian Regiment (1999–00)
- Conflicts: International Force for East Timor; Operation Astute
- Awards: Officer of the Order of Australia; Distinguished Service Cross; Conspicuous Service Cross; Medal of Merit (East Timor)

Major General Michael David "Mick" Slater, AO, DSC, CSC (born 8 July 1958) is a retired senior officer of the Australian Army, who served as Commander Forces Command from November 2011 until his retirement in January 2015.

== Early life ==
Slater was born in Brisbane, Queensland, on 8 July 1958 to Harold Leslie Slater and Shirly Florence (née Butler). Educated at St Joseph's College, Gregory Terrace, Slater studied surveying at the Queensland University of Technology before joining the Australian Army in 1978, where he graduated from the Officer Cadet School, Portsea.

== Army career ==
Slater has commanded at all levels from platoon to brigade level. He served as a platoon commander in both the 8th/9th Battalion, Royal Australian Regiment and 1st Battalion, Royal Australian Regiment, and later as intelligence officer, company commander and operations officer in 2nd/4th Battalion, Royal Australian Regiment. He was subsequently posted to the School of Infantry. In 1999–2000 he commanded 2nd Battalion, Royal Australian Regiment (2 RAR).

His operational commands have included 2 RAR, and the 3rd Brigade on operations in East Timor, during International Force for East Timor (INTERFET). Slater was awarded the Distinguished Service Cross for his distinguished command and leadership while commander of 2 RAR on Operation Warden, in East Timor. Also he served as an operations staff officer in the United States 3rd Army Headquarters in Kuwait on Operation Pollard.

He has undertaken formal education in mobilisation planning in the United States of America, and is a graduate of the Army Command and Staff College Fort Queenscliff, the Joint Services Command and Staff College, and the U.S. Army War College. Slater holds master's degrees in Strategic Studies and Business Administration.

In January 2011, Slater was appointed to lead the Flood Recovery Taskforce overseeing recovery from the 2010–2011 Queensland floods. This taskforce subsequently transitioned into the Queensland Reconstruction Authority, where Slater remained until 31 August 2011, formally handing over to former Director of the Defence Intelligence Organisation, Major General Richard Wilson. For his efforts in heading the taskforce, along with his stints as Head of the Defence Personnel Executive and Commander 1st Division, Slater was appointed an Officer of the Order of Australia in the 2012 Australia Day Honours List. From 2011 to 2015 Slater served as Commander Forces Command.

== Personal ==
Slater wed Danielle Lisa Morris on 5 February 2000. He has two sons and a daughter from a previous marriage. He appeared on the Chaser's War on Everything because of his honest remarks to a newsreader.

== Honours and awards ==

Officer of the Order of Australia (AO)	2012 Australia Day Honours, For distinguished service as Head of the Defence Personnel Executive, Commander 1st Division and Head of the Queensland Flood Recovery Task Force.
Member of the Order of Australia (AM)	2007 Queen's Birthday Honours, For exceptional service as the Commander Joint Task Force 630 on Operation LARRY ASSIST and as the Commander Joint Task Force 631 on Operation Astute.
Distinguished Service Cross (DSC)	25 March 2000, For distinguished command and leadership of the 2nd Battalion, the Royal Australian Regiment, during the deployment and operational phases of Operation Warden
Conspicuous Service Cross (CSC)	1998 Australia Day Honours
Australian Active Service Medal	with "EAST TIMOR" clasp
International Force East Timor Medal	
Australian Service Medal	with "IRAQ" & "TIMOR-LESTE" clasps
Defence Force Service Medal with 4 clasps	35–39 years service
Australian Defence Medal	
Medal of Merit	(East Timor)
Timor Leste Solidarity Medal	(East Timor)

== Notes ==
Military offices
Preceded by Major General Jeffrey Sengelman	Commander Forces Command; 2011–2015	Succeeded by Major General Gus Gilmore
Preceded by Major General Richard Wilson	Commander 1st Division; 2009–2011	Succeeded by Major General Rick Burr
