= Richard Wilson (general) =

Senior officer in the Australian Army

Richard Gary Wilson
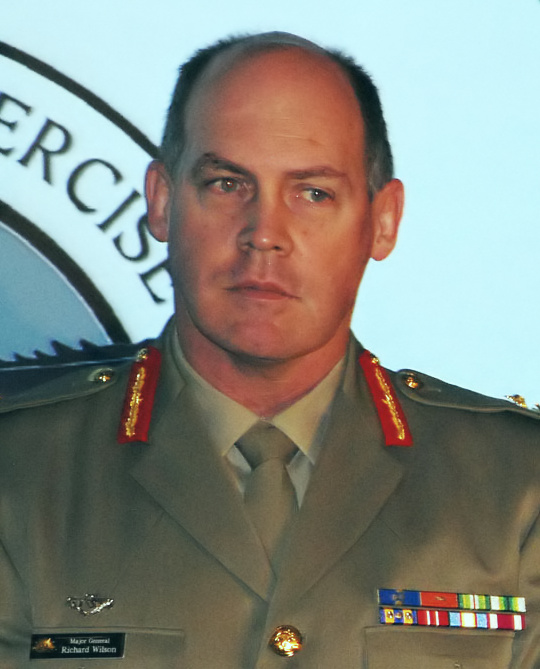
- Wilson in 2007
- Born: 16 January 1955 (age 71); Brisbane, Queensland
- Military career
- Allegiance: Australia
- Branch: Australian Army
- Service years: 1975–2012
- Rank: Major General
- Commands: Defence Intelligence Organisation (2009–11); 1st Division (2007–09); 7th Brigade (2002–03); 2nd Battalion, Royal Australian Regiment (1995–96); 2nd/4th Battalion, Royal Australian Regiment (1994)
- Conflicts: East Timor
- Awards: Officer of the Order of Australia; Commendation for Distinguished Service; Meritorious Service Medal (United States)

Major General Richard Gary Wilson, AO (born 16 January 1955) is a retired senior officer of the Australian Army. He served as Director of the Defence Intelligence Organisation from 2009 to 2011, and Chairman of the Queensland Reconstruction Authority in the wake of the 2010–11 Queensland floods.

== Early life ==
Richard Gary Wilson was born in Brisbane, Queensland, on 16 January 1955.

== Military career ==
A 1977 Infantry graduate of the Royal Military College, Duntroon, Wilson has extensive command experience in the Royal Australian Regiment.

He served as:

- (1978–1980) Platoon Commander in the 6th Battalion
- (1986) Adjutant, 2nd/4th Battalion
- (1987–88) Company Commander, 2nd/4th Battalion
- (1994) Commanding Officer, 2nd/4th Battalion
- (1995–96) Commanding Officer, 2nd Battalion
- (2002–03) Commander, 7th Brigade
- (2004) Director General Military Strategy
- (2005) Promoted to major general and assumed the position of commander, Training Command – Army.
- (2007) Commander 1st Division
- (2009) Director of the Defence Intelligence Organisation

He has held a wide range of staff appointments:

- (1981–82) Aide de Camp to the Chief of Defence Force Staff, Admiral Sir Anthony Synnot
- (1982) Operations Officer in the Army's Directorate of Operations
- (1989) Plans Officer (Land) on the Joint Exercise Planning Staff

Following Staff College, Wilson spent two years on exchange with the United States Army as an Operations Officer on the G3 staff of the 7th Infantry Division (Light), an element of the Rapid Deployment Force, based at Fort Ord in California.

In 1993, Wilson was seconded to the Office of National Assessments as a Defence Liaison Officer and Military Analyst. This was followed by an appointment as the Army representative on the Writing Team for the 1994 Defence White Paper 'Defending Australia'.

From August 1997 until January 2000, Wilson served as the first Chief Staff Officer Plans, or J5, at Headquarters Australian Theatre (HQAST), the Australian Defence Force's newly formed operational level headquarters. Of particular note during this period were the planning for the peace monitoring operations on Bougainville and the peace enforcement operations conducted in East Timor by an Australian-led international coalition force. For his services as the J5 at HQAST, Wilson was appointed a Member of the Order of Australia (AM) in the 2000 Australia Day Honours List.

Wilson served with the United Nations Transitional Administration in East Timor as commander of the Peacekeeping Forces in Sector West from July 2001 until March 2002. His overseas experience also includes two three-month tours of duty in Malaysia with Rifle Company Butterworth (1978 & 1988) and an exchange posting with the United States Army's 7th Infantry Division (Light) (1991–92) which included training deployments to Honduras, Panama and Colombia.

Wilson was responsible for "The Wilson Report" which examined C2 arrangements in the ADF and recommended the formation of a co-located Joint Headquarters. Located in NSW between Queanbeyan and Bungendore to the east of Canberra, this establishment is known as HQJOC(B).

On 6 July 2007, Wilson was appointed commander, 1st Division. He was appointed an Officer in the Order of Australia in the Australia Day 2009 Honours List.

Wilson succeeded Major General Mick Slater as Chair of the Queensland Reconstruction Authority on 1 September 2011.

== Qualifications ==
- 1977 Graduate of the Royal Military College, Duntroon
- 1977 Bachelor of Arts with First Class Honours from the University of New South Wales
- 1983 Master of Letters from the University of New England
- 1986 Doctor of Philosophy from the University of New South Wales. His doctoral thesis examined aspects of Australia's coastal surveillance regime.
- 1990 Graduate of the Australian Army Command and Staff College, Fort Queenscliff
- 2001 Graduate of the U.S. Army War College
- 2001 Master of Strategic Studies from the U.S. Army War College

== Personal ==
Richard Wilson and his wife have three children. He is keenly interested in sports, particularly rugby, enjoys reading military history and has a strong interest in environmental matters, strategic geography and international relations.

Military offices
Preceded by Major General Maurie McNarn	Director of the Defence Intelligence Organisation; 2009–2011	Succeeded by Major General Paul Symon
Preceded by Major General Ash Power	Commander 1st Division; 2007–2009	Succeeded by Major General Michael Slater
