= South Pacific Peacekeeping Force =

Peacekeeping force deployed to Bougainville in 1994

- Active: 4–21 October 1994
- Type: Peacekeeping force
- Size: ~1,000 personnel
- Engagements: Bougainville Civil War

Commanders
- Notable commanders: Peter Arnison; Peter Abigail

The South Pacific Peacekeeping Force (SPPKF) was an Australian-led peacekeeping force established during the Bougainville Civil War. Hastily established to provide security for peace talks around Arawa, the force consisted of an infantry security force, supported by various logistic and aviation assets, which were deployed and air and sea from Australia. Troops were drawn from Australia, New Zealand, Tonga, Vanuatu and Fiji. The force was deployed between 4 and 21 October 1994 before being withdrawn. Further peacekeeping troops were deployed to the island in 1997 as part of the Truce Monitoring Group.

== History ==
Consisting of troops from the Australian 3rd Brigade, supported by the Special Air Service Regiment, the Royal Australian Navy (RAN) (HMAS Success and Tobruk) and Royal Australian Air Force, the force was deployed to Bougainville to provide security for peace talks at Arawa. The Pacific nations of Tonga, Fiji and Vanuatu also provided troops to support the operation, providing mainly infantry. Tonga also provided a patrol boat, Veoa Pangai.

The overall commander was Major General Peter Arnison as the Australian Army's Land Commander, while the force in the joint force commander in the field was commanded by the 3rd Brigade commander, Brigadier Peter Abigail. The naval task group was commanded by Captain James O'Hara. Reconnaissance for the mission was undertaken between 21 and 23 September. Pre-deployment training was hastily undertaken in Townsville with 48 troops from Vanuatu, and 109 troops from Tonga being flown in by the RAAF on 26 September, followed by the Fijian contingent two days later.

The force consisted of 669 ground troops, rising to a total of over 1,000 personnel including ships' crews and other support staff assigned to Task Group 627.5. The main body depart Townsville by air on 7 October, and arrived in Honiara, where the Tobruk sailed the following day. Air assets included Blackhawk and Sea King helicopters, and C-130 Hercules and Caribou transports. New Zealand provided support to the operation with Royal New Zealand Air Force Hercules aircraft. Logistics support was provided by the 2nd Field Logistic Battalion and the 3rd Brigade Administrative Support Battalion. The 1st Battalion, Royal Australian Regiment and the 4th Field Regiment, Royal Australian Artillery provided liaison officers. Engineer support was provided by a troop from the 3rd Combat Engineer Regiment, which provided a high risk search element, that was bolstered by a small New Zealand Army detachment, a water purification element, plant support and construction support. Tobruk served as the force's headquarters afloat, and was anchored in Arawa Bay during the operation.

After arriving, troops were ferried between key locations including Buin, Panguna and Wakunai aboard Black Hawk helicopters and LCM-8 landing craft. Operations, including patrols, checkpoints, security cordons and escort details, were undertaken around Arawa, as well as Buin, Panguna and Wakunai. During the deployment, one of the RAN Sea King helicopters was fired upon by Papua New Guinea Defence Force personnel while undertaking a surveillance mission. It sustained light damage but returned safely from the mission.

The success of the peace talks was limited as some key members withdrew after ongoing military action by Papuan forces who failed to vacate the area. The deployment was hampered by its limited size, which meant it was unable to secure egress routes to the neutral zones that were established around the conference site that was established at Arawa High School; additionally, poor communications impacted upon command and control, and the ongoing presence of criminal gangs and restrictive rules of engagement undermined the confidence of stakeholders to participate in the conference. The hasty nature of the deployment also resulted in limited intelligence gathering, which impacted upon the development of coherent tactical, logistical and communications plans. It also led to inefficient loading of vessels, which had to be rectified once deployed.

The Australian involvement was codenamed Operation Lagoon. The force was deployed until 19 October when it began withdrawing. The withdrawal was preceded by a farewell parade in Buka attended by the PNG Prime Minister Julius Chan. Final force elements, including Tobruk had completed withdrawal by sea and air on 21 October. The SPPKF was followed by the New Zealand-led Truce Monitoring Group in 1997 and then the Australian-led Peace Monitoring Group in 1998.
