= 4th Regiment, Royal Australian Artillery =

Artillery unit of the Australian Army

- Active: 3 May 1960 – present
- Country: Australia
- Branch: Army
- Type: Artillery
- Role: Field artillery
- Size: Three batteries
- Part of: 3rd Brigade
- Garrison/HQ: Lavarack Barracks, Townsville
- Anniversaries: 4 May 1960 (Regimental birthday)

Insignia
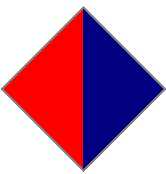
- Unit colour patch

The 4th Regiment, Royal Australian Artillery is an artillery unit of the Australian Army. Currently it provides close artillery support to the 3rd Brigade and is based at Chau Pha Lines, Lavarack Barracks in Townsville, Queensland. The regiment was raised in its current form in 1960 and is currently re-equipping with M777A2 lightweight towed howitzers. The regiment deployed during Australia's commitment to the Vietnam War and has subsequently deployed to Singapore and East Timor.

== History ==
The 4th Field Regiment was raised at Wacol on 4 May 1960, under the command of Lieutenant Colonel John Studdert. It was the first major Regular Army unit to be raised in Queensland. The regiment moved to Lavarack Barracks in 1968. As a complete unit, the regiment served two tours of duty in South Vietnam, as well as sending individual batteries to South Vietnam, Singapore, Malaya and East Timor. The ancestry of the regiment can be drawn indirectly to volunteer artillerymen of Victoria, but the modern Regiment has three distinct lineages: the 4th Field Artillery Brigade (Australian Imperial Force), the 4th Field Regiment RAA that formed part of the Militia, and the 2/4th Field Regiment, which was raised as part of the all volunteer Second Australian Imperial Force.

=== Colonial period and Federation ===
The first seeds of the modern regiment were sown in the Victorian colonial artillery, when the St Kilda Rifles were equipped with 9-pounder guns and became part of the Victoria Volunteer Artillery Regiment on 1 January 1856. The first use of the number "four" designation was made by a unit in New South Wales in June 1912, but the 4th Field Artillery Brigade was placed into suspended animation at the outbreak of the First World War.

=== First World War ===
With the expansion of the Australian Imperial Force to two infantry divisions, the 4th Field Artillery Brigade (4 FAB) AIF was raised as part of the 2nd Division, on 23 September 1915, in Melbourne's Albert Park. The majority of 4 FAB's officers and non-commissioned officers were drawn from the descendent units of the St Kilda gunners from the 7th Field Artillery Brigade and some personnel from the 8th Field Artillery Brigade. The unit embarked two months later for Suez. Initially, the brigade consisted of three batteries – the 10th, 11th and 12th – but in Egypt it as reorganised to reflect the British artillery organisation of four batteries, and another battery – the 19th – was raised. Embarking from Alexandria en route to Marseilles on 14 March 1916, the unit was equipped with British 18-pounder guns and was put into action near Armentieres on 8 April 1916.

The unit underwent a number of reorganisations, including the replacement of a field battery with a howitzer battery (the 19th was replaced by the 104th in May 1916) and a change in designation to "4th Australian Field Artillery Brigade" and re-equipping with various calibres of guns throughout the war, with the unit being withdrawn from action for the last time on 18 October 1918. After hearing of the Armistice while passing through Peronne on 11 November 1918, the unit redeployed to Thuin in Belgium. The demobilisation process began shortly afterwards and 4 FAB was finally disbanded on 18 May 1919.

During the war, the unit saw action in or around the Somme, Sausage Valley, Ypres, Bapaume, Bullecourt, Messines, Menin Road, Polygon Wood, Broodseinde and Passchendaele (during the Third Battle of Ypres), Villers-Bretonneux, Peronne, Mont St Quentin and along the Hindenburg Line. Casualties amounted to 104 killed and 583 wounded.

=== Interwar period ===
With the AIF disbanded, the Commonwealth Military Forces underwent a period of rejuvenation prior to the Great Depression. In 1921, one of the Victorian militia units from which 4 FAB AIF drew its officers (7th Field Artillery Brigade) was redesignated as "4th Field Artillery Brigade" to reflect the unit's AIF lineage. The unit formed part of the Victorian-based 3rd Field Artillery. From 1922 to 1931, the unit underwent a number of changes in its title, including "4th Australian Field Artillery", "IV Australian Field Artillery Brigade", before finally being named "4th Field Regiment Royal Australian Artillery (Militia)" in 1936. A number of organisational changes accompanied budgetary constraints and wider Army structure changes. Despite these changes, the unit managed to achieve a standard of technical proficiency that would serve the artillery well in the coming war.

=== Second World War ===
The lineage of the unit is divided equally between the continued service of the existing militia regiment in Victoria, and the establishment of the 2nd/4th Field Regiment, Second Australian Imperial Force, on 7 May 1940 as part of the 7th Division. As the 2/4th Field Regiment (2/4 Fd Regt) began recruiting at Melbourne's Caulfield Racecourse, its officers and gunners were heavily drawn from the militia units – namely 4 Fd Regt (M).

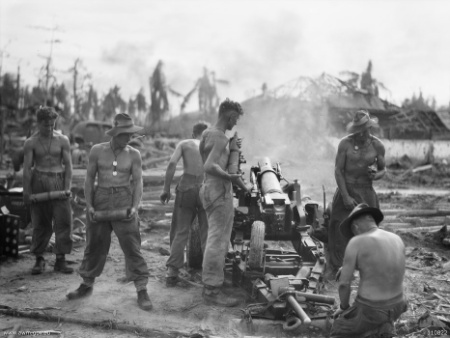
A 2/4th Field Regiment Short 25-pounder firing at Balikpapan, July 1945

2nd/4th Field Regiment AIF

The 2/4th Fd Regt formed and trained in Puckapunyal, Victoria, as part of the 7th Division. The regiment embarked at Port Melbourne on 21 October 1940, disembarking at El Kantara, in Egypt. Once trained and certified as ready for offensive operations on 19 May 1941, the regiment served in North Africa with the 7th Division's invasion of Syria. Notable actions included the crossing of the Litani River and the attack on Adloun. After the end of fighting in that theatre in July 1941, the regiment remained at Jdaide as part of the garrison and blocking force.

Soon after Japan entered the war in December 1941, 7th Division was relieved by the Australian 9th Division so that the former could return to defend Australia; the last members of the 2/4th Fd Regt sailed from the Middle East in January 1942 – the fall of Singapore causing the regiment to disembark in Port Adelaide on 23 March 1942. With the reorganisation of forces to the jungle division structure, the 2/4th Fd Regt was selected to remain as 7th Division's supporting artillery unit. After a long series of manoeuvres in Queensland, the batteries of the regiment arrived in New Guinea with their supported brigades from September 1943. A section of two guns from 2/4 Fd Regt's 8 Bty parachuted into Nadzab on 5 September 1943. The regiment continued operations in support of the 7th Division, including actions in the Finisterres and Shaggy Ridge. The 2/4th Fd Regt AIF was eventually relieved by 4th Fd Regt RAA from 1 February 1944.

After leave, the 2/4th Fd Regt concentrated in Brisbane and then the Atherton Tablelands in preparation for 7th and 9th Divisions' operations to follow up the retreating Japanese in New Guinea and Borneo. In June 1945, the 2/4th Fd Regt moved to Morotai, the assembly area for the Borneo campaign. The regiment supported 7th Division's amphibious attack on Balikpapan, being the first artillery (of the 7th Division's three artillery regiments) ashore. After the Japanese surrender on 15 August 1945, the majority of the regiment was returned to Chermside, Brisbane, and on 7 February 1946, the 2/4th Fd Regt AIF was disbanded. The regiment consisted of three batteries during the war: the 7th, 8th and 54th. A total of 30 personnel from the regiment lost their lives during the war.

4th Field Regiment RAA (Militia)

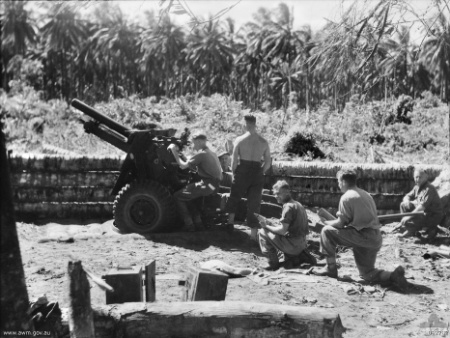
25-pounder guns from the Australian 4th Field Regiment fire upon Japanese positions near Porton Plantation, June 1945

The 4th Fd Regt RAA (M) was not mobilised until January 1942, after Japan's entry into the war and their rapid advance south through Malaya, Singapore, Rabaul and New Guinea. The regiment, as part of the 3rd Division, was moved to Warwick, Queensland, in March 1941 and given an operation area around Beenleigh. During this time, training exchanges took place between the 2/4th Fd Regt AIF and the 4th Fd Regt RAA (M). Further deployments and manoeuvres took place around Caboolture, Maryborough and Cabarlah. After the restructure of the Army's jungle divisions, the 4th Fd Regt RAA was moved to Helidon in July 1943, with orders to deploy to New Guinea received on 11 January 1944. The regiment originally relieved the 14th Fd Regt RAA at Lae before moving forward and relieving the 2/4th Fd Regt AIF in the Ramu Valley in February. The regiment redeployed to Bougainville with 3rd Division, arriving at Torokina on 5 November 1944. Notable actions took place along the Numa Numa Trail and during the amphibious assault on Porton Plantation in June 1944. After the Japanese surrender, the regiment settled into sport and recreation prior to departing Bougainville on 19 December 1945, arriving in Brisbane on Christmas Eve. On 31 December 1945, the regiment's war diary was closed and the regiment disbanded. The regiment's casualties during the war were 15 killed and 19 wounded.

=== Post Second World War ===
As part of the reorganisation of the Army with both National Service and the ill-fated "pentropic division", the requirement for an artillery unit to support the Battle Group in Townsville (based around the 2nd Battalion, the Royal Queensland Regiment) was identified. On 4 May 1960, the administrative cadre of the new 4th Field Regiment, Royal Australian Artillery (4 Fd Regt RAA) was established at Wacol, Brisbane. The regiment was to raise Regimental Headquarters, a Headquarters Battery and 103rd Field Battery (Fd Bty) RAA, while 105th Fd Bty RAA was transferred from 1st Field Regiment RAA in Holsworthy, Sydney. Around this time, veterans from 2nd/4th Field Regiment AIF travelled from Melbourne, presenting gifts to the regiment and cementing the lineage between the two. With the continued rotation of individual batteries to the Commonwealth Brigade in Malaya, 101 Fd Bty RAA reverted to command of 4 Fd Regt; 103 Fd Bty having been sent to relieve them in October 1961.

=== Vietnam ===
With the Menzies Government's announcement of the deployment of an infantry battalion group (1st Battalion, the Royal Australian Regiment) to South Vietnam on 29 April 1965, the regiment was tasked to deploy a battery. 105 Fd Bty was selected, brought up to war strength within the unit and deployed on 14 September 1965. In its place, the new 108 Fd Bty RAA was raised. The Battalion Group served with distinction, being awarded the United States Meritorious Unit Commendation and the Vietnam Cross of Gallantry with Palm Unit Citation. An increase in the Australian Government's commitment of a brigade headquarters (1st Australian Task Force) and an additional battalion from May 1966 resulted in the artillery formation in support of the Task Force (1 ATF) swelling to include: a Regimental Headquarters, 105 Fd Bty, 103 Fd Bty, 161 Fd Bty Royal New Zealand Artillery (which was to serve with 1 ATF throughout the war), a detachment from 131st Divisional Locating Battery RAA (131 Div Loc Bty), and a battery of 155mm self-propelled howitzers from the United States.

After the replacement of 105 Fd Bty by 101 Fd Bty in September 1966, the Australian artillery operated a relief cycle of 12 months: 1 Fd Regt, 4 Fd Regt and 12 Fd Regt in turn. In December 1966, a new 106 Fd Bty RAA was raised for service with 4 Fd Regt (composing 106 Fd Bty and 108 Fd Bty) in Vietnam from April 1967–68.

On 18 February 1968, a rear party for the regiment was raised at Wacol to provide a parent headquarters to the returning batteries. In June, a road party moved to Townsville, where the rear party occupied the new regimental lines on Lavarack Barracks. The regiment's area of the barracks was named "Chau Pha Lines" in honour of the action for which Forward Observer Lieutenant N.J. Clark was awarded the Military Cross. On 30 September 1968, 108 Fd Bty was deployed to Singapore as part of the continuing Australian presence in Malaya/Singapore, and the relieved 107 Fd Bty took their place as part of 4 Fd Regt.

The regiment returned to Vietnam in 1970, assuming control from 1 Fd Regt on 7 March 1970. Operations in Phuoc Tuy province were now generally smaller (battalion and company level operations, rather than division and brigade level) and far more dispersed, often requiring batteries to deploy in three gun troops or one/two gun sections to conduct artillery raids. 'The Horseshoe' position approximately 8 km southeast of Nui Dat was almost constantly manned by a section of guns. On 18/19 May 1970, following the announcement of withdrawal of Australia troops from Vietnam, the 131 Div Loc Bty detachment ceased operating its two radars. From October 1970, large-scale troop withdrawals began, beginning with the departure (without replacement) of 8th Battalion, the Royal Australian Regiment. The handover to 12 Fd Regt began on 4 February 1971, with the regiment relinquishing control on 8 March. The remaining elements of the regiment (107 Fd Bty) returned to Australia on 7 May 1971.

=== Post Vietnam ===
The rear party of 4 Fd Regt was raised in March 1971 and was relieved on 4 August. The unit was tasked with preparing 106 Fd Bty to relieve 108 Fd Bty in Singapore. 106 Fd Bty departed on 3 December 1971 and 108 Fd Bty returned to Australia on 14 December. Significantly, Tropical Cyclone Althea struck Townsville on Christmas Eve 1971, requiring over 100 soldiers to be recalled from leave to assist in the clean up. While the Army had a poor reputation in Townsville (a staging area for the Vietnam War), the clean up was a great public relations boost for the Army. With the Whitlam Government's announcement of the end of National Service in December 1972, all the regiment's National Servicemen were discharged prior to the end of the Christmas leave period.

With the withdrawal of the British from South East Asia, and the United States from Vietnam in the mid-1970s, Defence policy shifted to self-sufficiency and the Army reverted to a conventional structure. 4 Fd Regt fell under command of 3rd Task Force (3rd Brigade from 1 February 1982). After 106 Fd Bty's return from Singapore (it was not replaced) in February 1974, it was disbanded; the battery was re-raised between 23 June 1975 and 3 November 1977 to conduct trials for Army Headquarters using the new XM204 light howitzer and M198 medium howitzer from the United States.

On 21 February 1980, 3rd Task Force was designated the "Operational Deployment Force"; a readily deployable and air portable light infantry force for low-level contingencies. The regiment, as part of this force, was converted to a light scale organisation, and tasked with maintaining elements ready for deployment at short notice. In 1987, the regiment supported the Kangaroo '87 exercise around Katherine, Northern Territory. On 28 November 1987, 4 Fd Regt was awarded Freedom of Entry to the city of Thuringowa (Townsville's twin city, the two amalgamating in 2008) and the Freedom of Entry to the city of Townsville itself on the regiment's 50th birthday – 4 May 2010.

The regiment contributed support to various United Nations in Cambodia (1993), Somalia, Rwanda and Bougainville (1994). Organisational changes saw 'A' Field Battery RAA allocated as an additional gun battery for the regiment's Operational Deployment Force structure (though it remained an independent battery operating in support of the 3 RAR parachute battalion group in Holsworthy). In addition to the disbandment of the Artillery Headquarters in each of the division (Headquarters Divisional Artillery), the regiments came under the full command of their affiliated brigades. The East Timor crisis in 1999 saw 'A' Fd Bty and 108 Fd Bty deploy as additional rifle companies (gunlines) and Civil-Military Liaison teams (Forward Observer parties) in the 3 RAR and 2 RAR battalion groups respectively, departing Australia on 20 September. The remainder of the unit was placed on notice (though not used) to evacuate Australians from Jakarta. Upon 1 RAR's rotation into East Timor post-transition, 107 Fd Bty deployed only their Battery Commander and Observer parties, leaving their gun line in Australia. It was not until 1 July 2002 that 'A' Fd Bty was formally allocated to the regiment as a sub unit.

On 28 May 2002, during a training exercise at high range, 107 battery had an L119 catastrophically explode, injuring 6 of the soldiers operating the gun. Luckily, all 6 survived.

Further deployments of formed bodies to East Timor (Timor Leste) and Iraq accompanied smaller contributions to operations in the Sinai, Bougainville, the Solomon Islands, and Afghanistan. The latter deployments have included detachments with British Army artillery units.

=== Restructure ===
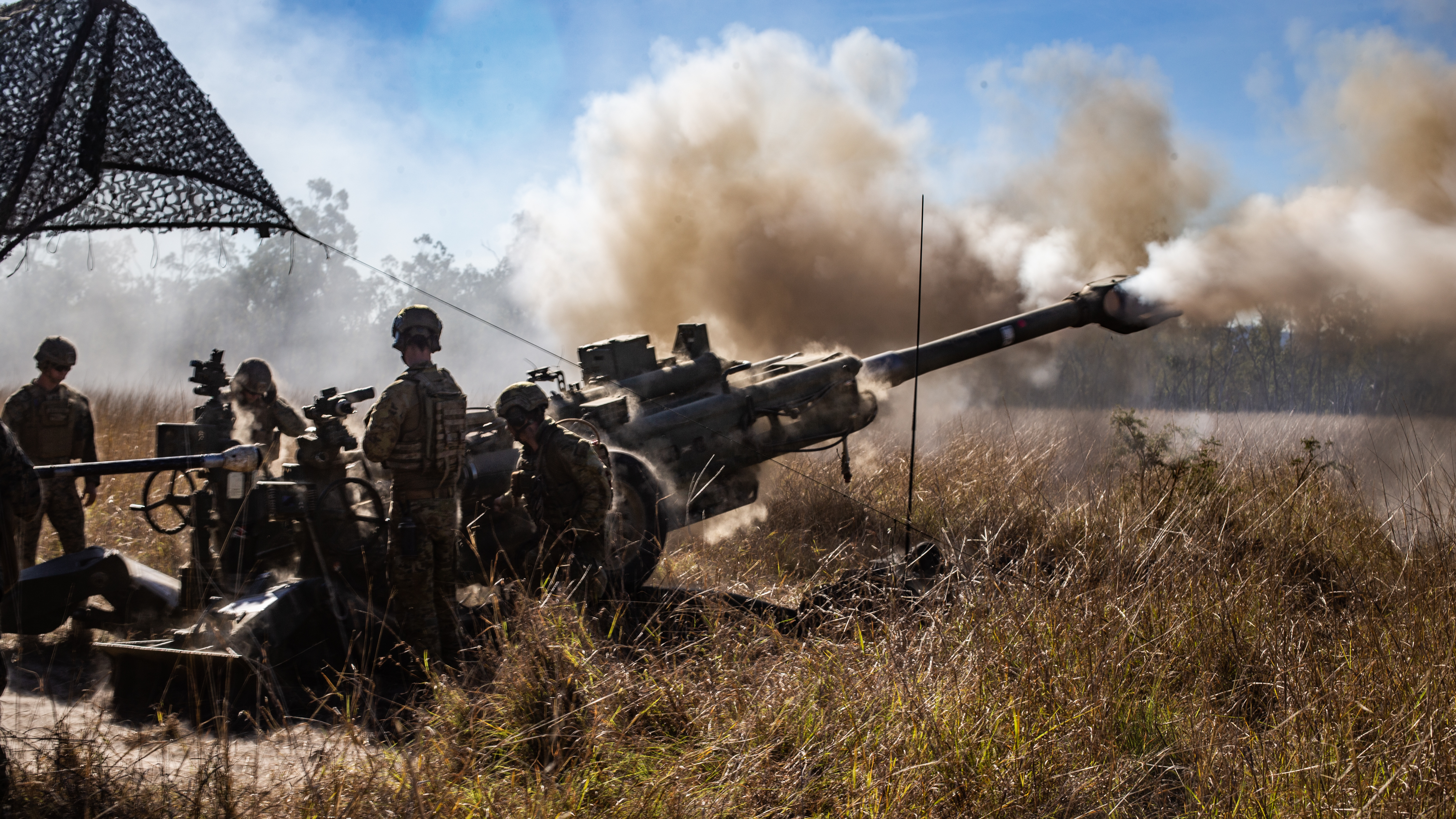
4th Regiment gunners firing a M777A2 howitzer during 2021

In January 2011, the Australian Regular Army field regiments were reorganised to contain three observation post batteries supported by a single gun battery equipped with 12 guns. As part of the reorganisation, the regiments and their batteries were renamed with the word "field" removed from their title with the regiment becoming 4th Regiment, Royal Australian Artillery. Under this structure each regiment was capable of providing a brigade-level Joint Fires and Effects Coordination Centre (JFECC) and every observation post battery providing a battle group JFECC as well as three combat team joint fires teams. Every gun battery consisted of three troops of four guns. Employment categories were changed in preparation for new equipment including 155mm towed howitzers and battle management system.

The regiment's structure of three observation batteries and a single gun battery was deemed unsuccessful. In 2012, the regiment reorganised to a traditional battery structure and with an Operations Support Battery. In 2013, the regiment reorganised again with a temporary structure in preparation to implement Plan Beersheba re-rolling 108th Battery as an (Observation Post) battery for 2nd Battalion, Royal Australian Regiment (2 RAR) which was converting to amphibious infantry. While awaiting 2nd Cavalry Regiment relocating to Lavarack Barracks. In January 2015, the regiment reorganised with 108th Battery (Observation Post) becoming a sub-unit of 2 RAR and re-raised 106th Battery on 5 December 2014 to have three gun batteries. In the new structure, each gun battery will be equipped with four 155 mm towed howitzers. The regiment will have a strength of nearly 350 personnel when 106th Battery reaches full strength with plans to increase the number of females.

=== Self-Propelled Howitzers ===
4th Regiment RAA will receive AS9 Huntsman 155mm self propelled howitzers from 2025.

== Current formation ==
4th Regiment, RAA currently consists of:

- 106th Battery
- 107th Battery
- 109th Battery
- Operations Support Battery
- Combat Service Support Battery
- 108th Battery (Observation Post) - 2 RAR sub-unit

== Equipment ==
Under the Land 17 project in 2011 the regiment received 12 M777A2 lightweight towed howitzers to replace its L119 field guns, and the Advanced Field Artillery Tactical Data System (AFATDS), which is a fully automated digital battle-management system. In early 2012 it took delivery of the Digital Terminal Control System for use by their Joint Fires Teams. The regiment is also equipped with Australian made Bushmaster Protected Mobility Vehicles for use as Command Posts and troop transport.
