= Battle of Doan =

2011 military operation

- Part of the War in Afghanistan (2001–2021), Operation Slipper
Date	9 September 2011
Location	Doan village, Oruzgan Province, Afghanistan
Result	Coalition victory: Taliban withdrew; Village of Doan secured

Belligerents
Australia; Islamic Republic of Afghanistan; United States	(Afghanistan) Taliban

Commanders and leaders
(Australia) LT (Afghanistan) LT	Unknown

Units involved
(Australia) 2 RAR (Afghanistan) Afghan National Army (United States) 29th Infantry Division	

Strength
(Australia) (Afghanistan) 60+ combined forces (Australia) Several Bushmasters (United States) air support and QRF assets	Unknown number of insurgents

Casualties and losses
(Australia) 1 wounded (Australia) 1 Bushmaster destroyed	Unconfirmed number of fighters killed/or injured 1 local arrested on suspicion.

The Battle of Doan was a ground battle in the War in Afghanistan fought in Doan Village on 9 September 2011 between forces of the Taliban and elements of the Afghan National Army accompanied by units of the Australian Army deployed under Operation Slipper. The Taliban fired harassing fire at an Australian and Afghan patrol near the village of Doan, in Oruzgan Province, an I.E.D causing the loss of one Australian vehicle, with one soldier wounded. One person was arrested, while casualties on the Taliban side are unknown.

== Background ==
The village of Doan is located in the western part of Oruzgan Province which is often called the "Wild West of Oruzgan" due to the high level of violent attacks. One of the most remote outposts in Oruzgan is Patrol Base Tinsley, which is where Australians train their Afghan colleagues. Part of their training involves patrols in order to halt the advance of the Taliban. The Australians and ANA conducted a three-day joint patrol to the village of Doan. During this time, they were constantly being engaged by sporadic fire from the 'green zone'.

== Battle ==
On 9 September 2011 a joint patrol of Australians from Combat Team Charlie, Mentoring Task Force 3 and ANA troops came under Taliban fire near Doan. The patrol made its way through the village before exchanging fire on the outskirts of Doan. RPGs and a mortar crew added to the coalition's firepower. During the battle, a Bushmaster vehicle was destroyed when it hit an IED whilst under fire, the crew had to bail out and a digger was wounded and airlifted to hospital. The Taliban eventually fortified themselves on a hill and managed to counter all attacks. The fighting dragged on well into the night.

== Aftermath ==
The Australian who was wounded was airlifted to a Coalition hospital in Tarin Kowt and treated for his injuries. A squad of US soldiers of the 29th Infantry Division which had been assigned as the security force for the region's Civil Affairs forces, assisted in the Quick Reaction Force (QRF), casevac, and resupply of Australian forces. Over the previous few days, US forces had conducted combat operations in the Kod Valley to the north of Doan. It is estimated that a small number of Taliban were killed during the battle. During the battle, the Australians arrested a local Afghan on suspicion of aiding the Taliban. No civilians were killed or injured and the village of Doan was secured.
