= 2nd Battalion, Royal Australian Regiment =

Australian Army infantry battalion

- Active: 16 October 1945 – 15 August 1973; 1 February 1995 – present
- Country: Australia
- Branch: Australian Army
- Type: Amphibious light infantry
- Role: Reconnaissance Pre-landing Force Operations
- Size: 350
- Part of: 1st Division
- Garrison/HQ: Townsville
- Nickname: Boys in Black
- Motto: 'Second To None'
- Colors: Black
- March: Ringo (Band); Back in Black (Pipes and Drums)
- Anniversaries: 16 October (battalion birthday)
- Engagements: Korean War: Fourth Battle of The Hook; Malayan Emergency; Vietnam War: Operation Coburg; East Timor; Iraq War: Battle of Al Rumaythah; Afghanistan: Battle of Doan
- Decorations: Gallantry Cross Unit Citation (South Vietnam)

Insignia
- Unit Colour Patch (UCP)
- Tartan: Australian (Pipers kilts and plaids)

The 2nd Battalion (Amphibious), The Royal Australian Regiment (2 RAR (Amphib)) is an amphibious reconnaissance battalion of the Australian Army part of the 1st Division Amphibious Task Group based at Lavarack Barracks in Townsville.

2 RAR was initially formed as the 66th Australian Infantry Battalion, 2nd AIF in 1945 as part of the 34th Brigade (Australia) and since then it has deployed to wars and conducted operations during Japan, the Korean War (As well as Post-Armistice Service), The Malayan Emergency (two tours of 1955–1957 and 1961–1963), Vietnam War (two tours 1967–1968 and 1970–1971), Rwanda, Border Protection, East Timor, the Iraq War (2003), the Solomon Islands, the Afghanistan War, Domestic and Foreign Assistance operations due to flood, cyclone, etc. In 2011, 2 RAR was selected to be the Army's Trial Battalion to be part of Amphibious Ready Element Landing Force embarked on the Navy's new Canberra-class amphibious assault ships. The conversion process was officially completed on 16 October 2017 when the battalion took on this specialist role and was renamed 2 RAR (Amphib), which incorporated its speciality in the name. The battalion now provides a world-class pre-landing force (PLF) capability to the ADF.

== History ==
=== Formation (South West Pacific) ===
2 RAR was formed originally as the 66th Battalion, 2nd AIF at the end of World War II on 16 October 1945 as a regular infantry force raised from volunteers from the 9th Division for service with the British Commonwealth Occupation Force in Japan. The battalion was formed first at Labuan in British North Borneo, before being moved to the large Australian base on Morotai, Netherland East Indies and joining the other two newly formed battalions (65th and 67th Australian Infantry Battalions).

=== Japan (1946–1948) ===
The battalion was stationed primarily at Hiro as part of the 34th Australian Infantry Brigade from February 1946 to December 1948, when they returned to Australia. A month earlier, on 23 November 1948 it was renamed the 2nd Battalion, Australian Regiment with the royal regimental prefix being granted on 31 March 1949.

=== Puckapunyal (1949–1953) ===
Upon 2 RAR's return to Australia in December 1948, they became part of the 1st Independent Brigade Group at Puckapunyal, Victoria, where they would remain until March 1953 as a training unit for recruits for the two battalions fighting in Korea. During this period upon returning to Australia, the battalion's colour was red. The three battalion's were given the colours, 1 RAR - Blue, 2 RAR - Red and 3 RAR - Green similar to a British regiment at the time. The flag of the battalion was of a red background and a large white '2'. Whilst based in Puckapunyal it was the custom of the battalion's officers to wear a black scarf/cravat after hours. The battalion also received some new drums which had the standard black sides when they arrived, these were left black due to the death of the king. Prior to Korea SGT Keith Foran, a platoon SGT in D Company who was later KIA, had his soldiers polish their gaiters black to help waterproof soldiers boots. This was shown to the CO and then adopted by the battalion. Thus the battalion was unofficially 'Black'

=== Korean War (1953–1954) ===
2 RAR's involvement in the Korean War was limited by the fact that it was not committed until late in the fighting. Instead, as mentioned above, the unit was used as a training unit that provided reinforcements for the other two RAR battalions that had been sent to Korea. The unit embarked for Korea on 5 March 1953 on board the MV New Australia, arriving on 17 March 1953. A few days later detachments from all three RAR battalions paraded at Camp Casey near Tongduchon, South Korea, the first time that the Royal Australian Regiment had paraded as a whole.

In April, 2 RAR relieved 1 RAR and became part of the 28th British Commonwealth Brigade, attached to the 1st Commonwealth Division. At this stage of the war, a static phase had developed. Relieving a French battalion, 2 RAR took up a position along the Jamestown Line on Hill 159 and began patrolling in the 'no-man's land' area around the Imjin and Samichon Rivers.

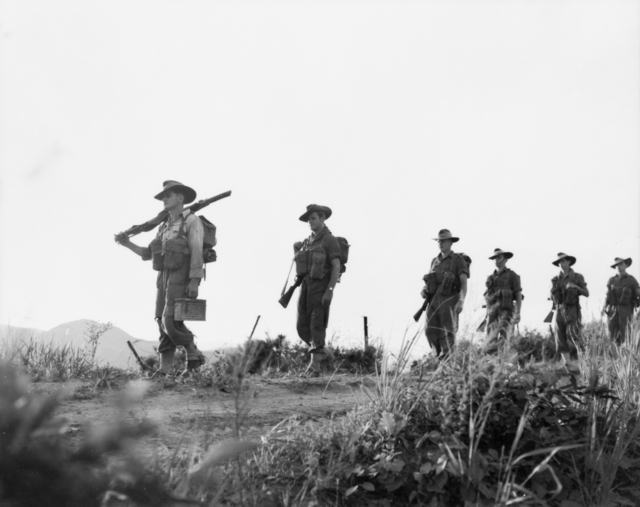
Soldiers from 2RAR withdraw to the DMZ Korea, 1953

On 9 July 1953 the battalion relieved the 1st Battalion, The King's Regiment around a feature known as 'The Hook' on the left flank of the 1st Commonwealth Division. As peace talks were currently under way, offensive operations were not undertaken by the Australians in this time, although 2 RAR continued to conduct patrolling operations, as well as the myriad of other tasks associated with defense such as maintaining minefields, digging trenches, capturing prisoners and collecting intelligence.

A few weeks later, on the night of 24 July 1953, the Chinese attacked the UN positions on The Hook in an effort to gain more ground prior to the signing of the armistice agreement. Over the course of two nights, waves of Chinese soldiers attacked the Australian and American positions in frontal assaults aimed at overwhelming the defenders through sheer weight of numbers. In between attacks, artillery and mortar attacks were launched during the day to soften up the defences. In an effort to hold the line reinforcements from 'D' Company, 3 RAR and the 1st Battalion, Durham Light Infantry were brought up and placed under 2 RAR command before the attacks were finally beaten off on the morning of 26 July. The number of Chinese dead was estimated between 2,000 and 3,000, while 2 RAR's casualties for the two nights were five killed and another twenty-four wounded.

There were no further attacks and the armistice came into effect the following day. Despite the end of hostilities, 2 RAR remained in Korea as part of the UN forces stationed in the country until 6 April 1954, when it returned to Australia, once again on the MV New Australia. Total losses for 2 RAR while it had been in Korea had been 22 killed.

=== Enoggera (1954 -1955) ===
2 RAR upon returning was welcomed back with a March through Brisbane. 2 RAR was also the first battalion of the RAR to receive its colours. This occurred during a period known as the 'Colours Controversy' and 2 RAR catholic members did not go on the parade ground, they held ground around the edge, this was solved later in the ADF by three members of different denominations, blessing, consecrating and dedicating the colours when they are introduced into service. During this period members of 2 RAR were posted to the Jungle Training Centre in Cunungra, QLD to help restart this. The first troops to use the newly started facility were rotations from 2 RAR preparing for service in Malaya.

=== Malayan Emergency (1955–1957) ===
In the late 1950s and early 1960s, 2 RAR undertook two tours of Malaya during the Malayan Emergency, the first between October 1955 and October 1957 and the second between October 1961 and August 1963. The battalion arrived in Malaya for its first tour on 19 October 1955 and was once again attached to the 28th Commonwealth Infantry Brigade Group as part of the British Commonwealth Far East Strategic Reserve (FESR) along with British and New Zealand troops. Throughout the two-year tour the battalion was based at Minden Barracks on Penang Island, although it spent large periods of time in the jungle conducting operations and exercises that frequently lasted weeks at a time.

Lieutenant General Sir Henry Wells, Chief of the General Staff, inspects troops from 2RAR in Malaya c. 1956.

Due to a delay in obtaining Australian government approval to conduct operations against the Malayan Communist Party (MCP), and their armed wing the Malayan National Liberation Army, 2 RAR did not commence operations until 1 January 1956 when the battalion was involved in Operation Deuce, which was a search and security operation in Kedah that was to last until the end of April when 2 RAR was relieved by the 1st Battalion, Royal Malay Regiment. For the next twenty months the battalion would continue to conduct similar operations – known as Operations Shark North and Rubberlegs – mainly in Perak, which was considered to be one of the main areas of Communist activity. These operations were primarily long-distance patrols in and around jungle areas searching for the Communists and providing perimeter security for the 'New Villages'.

During this time contacts were very limited, and the most intense action came on 22 June 1956 when a five-man patrol from 2 RAR was ambushed by a group of Communists near the Sungei Bemben reservoir. Three Australians were killed in this incident and three others were wounded and as other Australian patrols converged on the area a firefight ensued in which two of the attackers were killed before the others broke contact and dispersed.

Throughout 1956 operations continued and 2 RAR's companies took turns rotating through Kroh in the north of Perak on the Thai-Malay border. Between May and June 1957, 2 RAR took part in Operation Eagle Swoop, during which, on the afternoon of 24 June, they discovered a large Communist camp and in the subsequent clash two Australians were killed and one was wounded. Further operations were undertaken, including further patrols and ambushes, until finally in August 1957 2 RAR was withdrawn from anti-Communist operations and returned to its primary deterrence role as part of the FESR. This did not last long, however, as the battalion returned to Australia shortly afterwards in October 1957, to a large welcome home parade in Sydney. 2 RAR's total losses for the Malayan Emergency were 14 killed.

At the end first tour or upon return home the battalion's colour was red still, its flag was red with a gold skippy badge and a small '2' centrally below this in gold as well. During ceremonial occasions the battalion also wore red and white sock flashes in its ceremonial tropical uniform. In 1957, the three battalion's of the regiment were issued the first flags of the regiment that were now standardized. 2 RAR was now officially 'Black'

=== Holsworthy (1957–1961) ===
During its time at Holsworthy it became a 'Pentropic' battalion establishment. This was a large US styled organization with a colonel as CO. With the closing of the 1st Infantry Brigade Group, the fourth original large brass skippy badge was given to 2 RAR for safe keeping.

=== Malaya (1961–1963) ===
The Emergency had officially ended in 1960, however the battalion's second tour of Malaya came four years later when it joined the 28th Brigade again, this time at Canberra lines, Camp Terendak near Malacca in October 1961. While they had been in Australia, they had been converted to a Pentropic Battalion, however, prior to their deployment they had been converted back to the tropical establishment. In August 1962 they were committed to anti-Communist operations in Perlis and Kedah once more, searching for the remnants of the MNLA Communist guerrillas along the Thai-Malay border. This lasted only a couple of months before it was decided to withdraw the battalion from this role for six months' training as part of the FESR. Regardless, several 2 RAR companies were used on further operations against the Communists in May 1963, before the battalion returned to Australia in August, without having suffered any losses. During this second tour, the battalion wore sock flashes that were both black as well as a black backing to their Australia's on their epaulets, soldiers did not wear lanyards.

=== Enoggera (1963–1967) ===
During its time back in Enoggera, the battalion once again became a Pentropic battalion. In 1964 it gave approximately a company's worth of soldiers to enable the formation of 4 RAR in Woodside as a battalion again. 2 RAR gifted the fourth large Skippy badge held in trust to 4 RAR on its formation. In 1965, the battalion was split in half to facilitate the formation of 6 RAR, giving over two rifle companies and elements of support and admin companies. As they were a Pentropic battalion, Echo company was used as the initial HQ for the formation of 6 RAR. Lanyards began to be worn by the battalion by all soldiers and with the rapid expansion of the RAR new lanyard colours were created for all battalions. 2 RAR's was black.

=== South Vietnam (1967–1968) ===
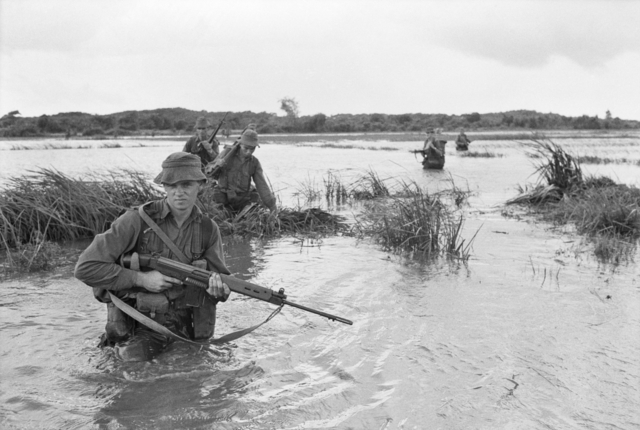
Members of A Company, 2 RAR during a patrol in September 1967

Two tours of South Vietnam were completed by 2 RAR during the Vietnam War. The first tour was between May 1967 and June 1968 with the second between May 1970 to May 1971. An advanced party from 2 RAR arrived in South Vietnam for their first tour in April 1967, although the main force did not deploy until the following month, embarking upon HMAS Sydney which had been converted to a troop carrier. Stationed at Nui Dat in Phuoc Tuy Province as part of the 1st Australian Task Force (1 ATF), they took over from the 6th Battalion, Royal Australian Regiment.

Many of the battalion's members had recently served an eighteen-month period overseas in Malaysia and Borneo. This restriction would mean that many personnel would only be able to serve a six-month tour and, as such, 2 RAR was brought up to full strength by accepting a draft of national servicemen from Australia. They were joined by Victor Company from the 1st Battalion, Royal New Zealand Infantry Regiment which had served with 6RAR at the end of that battalion's tour. A replacement Victor Company and a second New Zealand company, Whisky Company, arrived in December 1967 and were also placed under 2 RAR's command. In March 1968 the three Australian and two New Zealand companies were officially integrated and the battalion was given the formal title of 2 RAR/NZ (ANZAC) Battalion.

During 2 RAR's thirteen-month tour they undertook a total of 23 operations with the New Zealanders in Phuoc Tuy and Bien Hoa Provinces. This constant schedule of patrols and ambushes within its area of operations kept the Vietcong (VC) off balance. Many of these operations were conducted as an independent unit, while others were conducted with the support of other 1 ATF units. The most significant of these operations was Operation Coburg, which was mounted between 24 January and 1 March 1968 in the border area between Phuoc Tuy and Long Khanh Provinces. This operation was the first operation conducted by 1 ATF outside of Phuoc Tuy and was aimed at denying the VC the ability to attack the large American bases at Long Binh and Bien Hoa. While this operation was underway, the Tet Offensive was launched, the result of which was that as well as contacting local force VC units, 2 RAR also came up against the main force units as well. 91 VC or North Vietnamese People's Army of Vietnam (PAVN) soldiers were killed in this operation.

2 RAR's involvement in Coburg ended on 14 February, although W Company, 1 RNZIR, remained with 3 RAR until the end of the operation in March. Operations in Phuoc Tuy continued until 25 April 1968 when the battalion was deployed to the Bien Hoa–Long Khanh border to undertake Operation Toan Thang. This was to be 2 RAR's last major operation of its first tour and in June 1968 they were relieved by 4 RAR, and returned to Australia, arriving there on 13 June. The two New Zealand infantry companies thereafter integrated with 4 RAR, who also became 4 RAR/NZ (ANZAC) Battalion.

=== Enoggera (1968–1969) ===
The battalion returned to Enoggera barracks in Brisbane on HMAS Sydney.

=== Townsville (1969 till 1970) ===
The battalion was moved to Lavarack Barracks in Townsville, QLD, taking over the 6 RAR location when they went on their second tour to South Vietnam. Again there was a massive influx of National Servicemen to enable the battalion's next rotation to South Vietnam.

=== South Vietnam (1970–1971) ===
2 RAR's second tour started, when it returned to South Vietnam in May 1970, relieving 6 RAR/NZ (ANZAC) Battalion at Nui Dat. Consisting of three rifle companies and a support company, 2 RAR was once again joined by two companies from the RNZIR and on 15 May the ANZAC title was adopted again as 2 RAR/NZ (ANZAC) Battalion . The second tour was focused mainly upon 'pacification', which sought to provide security of the struggling South Vietnamese state by seeking out and destroying the VC in their bases areas and isolating them from the ordinary civilian population. This was monotonous work for the infantrymen. The VC had been greatly weakened by the failure of the Tet Offensive, and as a result over the twelve months that 2 RAR was deployed contact was significantly less than had been experienced during the first tour, sustaining half the number of casualties. Nevertheless, the presence of two strong provincial VC regiments in the area meant that security in Phuoc Tuy remained problematic until the end and in May 1971, 4 RAR, again also becoming 2 RAR/NZ (ANZAC) Battalion, took over from 2 RAR and the battalion returned to Australia.

Total 2 RAR casualties for both tours were 32 killed and 182 wounded. New Zealand casualties over both tours were 10 killed and 57 wounded. Balanced against this, the battalion was credited with having killed 297 VC and captured a further 23.

=== Townsville (1971 – 15 August 1973) ===
the battalion returned from South Vietnam mid-year on the Sydney, anchored off Magnetic island. The battalion was shipped by landing craft to ANZAC Park where it conducted a march through the city before departing on leave. The battalion was still receiving national Servicemen after its return. This ended in 1972 severely depleting its numbers.

=== 2/4 RAR (15 August 1973 to 1 February 1995) ===
As part of the post-Vietnam War reduction of the Australian Army 2 RAR was combined with 4 RAR between 15 August 1973 and 1 February 1995 as the 2nd/4th Battalion, Royal Australian Regiment.

The linked battalion occupied 4 RAR's lines in Lavarack barracks, upon formation with the CO from 4 RAR becoming the CO of 2/4 RAR. The linked battalions were tasked with maintaining the customs and traditions from the linked Battalions. Upon linking, a combined flag was raised, however the battalion wore a combination of two lanyards sewn together. A braided lanyard was introduced in 1975. 2/4 RAR provided soldiers for 12 Company sized rotations to Malaysia, based at RAAF Butterworth, later RMAF Butterworth. This was later redesignated Non-Warlike Operational service in the 1990s under the Australian Honours and Awards System. 2/4 RAR also provided three soldiers (2 officers and 1 NCO) to the Commonwealth Monitoring Force in Rhodesia/Zimbabwe transition in 1979/1980. In 1980, 2/4 RAR became part of what was initially known as the Operational Deployment Force along with 1 RAR, it later became known as the Ready Deployment Force (RDF) and then Ready battalion Group (RBG). As part of this, it was reacted on different occasions to provide contingencies for developments in the SW Pacific. In 1988, the battalion was issued DPCU, this was the first wholesale issue that would change the look of the ADF along with other Armies, to wearing camouflage clothing as everyday dress. In 1992 to 1993 the battalion deployed 29 members of the battalion to Cambodia as part of the Force Communications Unit (FCU), which was set up to provide the communications capability for UNTAC. 2/4 RAR, being the online battalion at the time, also reacted 12 Platoon, Delta Company to provide the security element to the Aviation Task Group sent to Cambodia in support of the UN run Elections. In 1993, 1 RAR was reacted to form the basis of a group (1 RAR Bn Group) to be sent to Somalia, as with both battalion's at the time they were never at full strength, thus 54 soldiers privates were sent to 1 RAR to fill their gaps for their deployment to OP Solace as the 1 RAR Battalion Group. In 1994, the Australian Government decided that it would support UNIMIR II with the medical capability, after the failure of UNIMIR. This meant that A Company, 2/4 RAR was warned for service in Rwanda and 2/4 RARs 'Samichon lines' became the mounting base for the deployment. A Company deployed to Rwanda in August and just prior to Christmas the decision to unlink 2/4 RAR was made. on 1 February 1995, 2/4 RAR conducted an unlinking parade in Townsville. 2/4 RAR did not provide troops or split the battalion, it became 2 RAR wholly. At the same time that the unlinking parade occurred the deployed elements of the battalion also conducted unlinking parades, with D Company in Malaysia at RMAF Butterworth, A Company in Rwanda on OP Tamar and elements of Support Company supporting an Army Reserve Exercise at Shoalwater Bay.

=== Rwanda ===
Between August 1994 and August 1995 two contingents of Australian soldiers were deployed to Rwanda as part of the United Nations Assistance Mission in Rwanda (UNAMIR). The deployment was focused upon providing humanitarian assistance and medical care for sick and injured civilians and as such a combat role was not envisaged, however, a rifle company was sent also in order to protect the medical team and command elements. The first contingent drew security personnel from 'A' Company, 2/4 RAR and was deployed between August 1994 and February 1995, with this contingent returning as 'A' Company, 2 RAR. A second contingent was sent that replaced them, this time drawn from 'B' Company, 2 RAR,. During this deployment, the company was responsible for providing security at Kigali airport and for providing escorts to the medical team.

In April 1995, there was a serious outbreak of violence Kibeho refugee camp that 2 RAR personnel. Outnumbered and unable to undertake offensive operations, the Australians were unable to intervene. It has since been estimated that it would be over 5000 dead refugees that were killed by members of the Rwandan Patriotic Army in this incident.

The second contingent remained in Rwanda until August 1995 when it was withdrawn from the war torn country and the Australian commitment ended.

=== Border protection (1998) ===
In 1998 members of Recon/Sniper/Surveillance Platoon were deployed as part of Operation Cranberry with their ANTAS Thermal Imager to support customs in the Torres Strait.

=== East Timor (1999–2000) ===
In September 1999, Australia deployed a brigade-sized combat element to East Timor as part of the UN sanctioned International Force – East Timor (INTERFET) that was deployed in order to restore law and order and end the widespread violence and destruction that had broken out following a referendum in August that had shown overwhelming support for independence from Indonesia. As a part of this deployment, the Australian force was charged with restoring peace and security and facilitating the provision of humanitarian assistance. 2 RAR was one of the first units deployed once the airfield at Dili had been secured by elements of the Special Air Service Regiment. Arriving in Dili on 20 September 1999 having been flown in from Townsville, they immediately started the process of restoring order to the capital so that it could be used as an operational base from which further operations could be launched in the surrounding countryside.

As the rest of 2 RAR began to dig in around Komoro Airport to secure the air link with Australia and launched a number of patrols throughout the western part of the Dili, 'C' Company was detached to secure the beachhead at the docks. With two M-113 APCs from 3/4 Cav to provide fire support, 'C' Company began moving towards the docks, but found the way blocked as they encountered a number of platoon-strength roadblocks that had been set up by the Indonesian military TNI. Overcoming these obstacles by swarming over them in massed company formations, 'C' Company eventually reached the dock where they encountered large numbers of refugees as well as groups of Indonesian military and militia. A tense stand-off followed as the Australians set about the task of securing the port in preparation for the arrival of the follow-on seaborne forces that were to land the following day.

The following day, as reinforcements arrived at the dock by sea, 2 RAR was relieved by 3 RAR (Para), whose Admin Company took over the task of guarding the docks, freeing up 2 RAR to continue further operations around Dili. Initial operations focused upon carrying out building searches, setting up roadblocks and vehicle checkpoints, gathering intelligence from locals and finding and disarming the local militias that had largely been responsible for the violence.

On 27 September, 'D' Company, 2 RAR, conducted an airmobile operation into Liquica, west of Dili, before the battalion returned to the capital to continue the task of making the city safe. By the beginning of October Dili had been fairly well secured and so INTERFET began to move out into areas along the western border with Indonesian West Timor. 2 RAR's rifle companies were deployed to Balibo by helicopter on 1 October, while the rest of the battalion arrived the next day. Working closely with other units in the area from New Zealand and Britain, the northern border area was secured before pushing further inland to Maliana, Bobonaro and Suai, which were considered important towns in the western area of the country.

The key town of Suai was cleared on 6 October when 2 RAR operating alongside elements from the SASR and the Gurkhas, was airlifted into the town. In doing so, 116 pro-Indonesian militiamen were captured, later sparking further violence when other militia units began attacking the Australians, resulting in two 2 RAR soldiers being wounded.

Up until this time despite several cases of tense stand-offs earlier in the operation, for the most part the TNI had largely kept its distance from the Australian force as they carried out their evacuation back to Indonesia, however, on 10 October a clash occurred near the border at Mota'ain. As an Australian patrol from 'C' Company advanced towards the border Indonesian military, police, and militia forces opened fire upon the lead platoon and the Australians returned fire, resulting in a number of Indonesian casualties. For his leadership under fire, Corporal Paul Teong, commander of the lead section in the forward platoon during the contact, was awarded the Distinguished Service Medal.

Amidst growing concern of further obstruction by the TNI, 2 RAR continued to conduct operations in the western border areas as slowly but surely security was restored to East Timor. On 3 January 2000, 2 RAR was relieved by 5/7 RAR (MECH). The following month INTERFET began transferring responsibility to the United Nations Transitional Administration in East Timor (UNTAET).

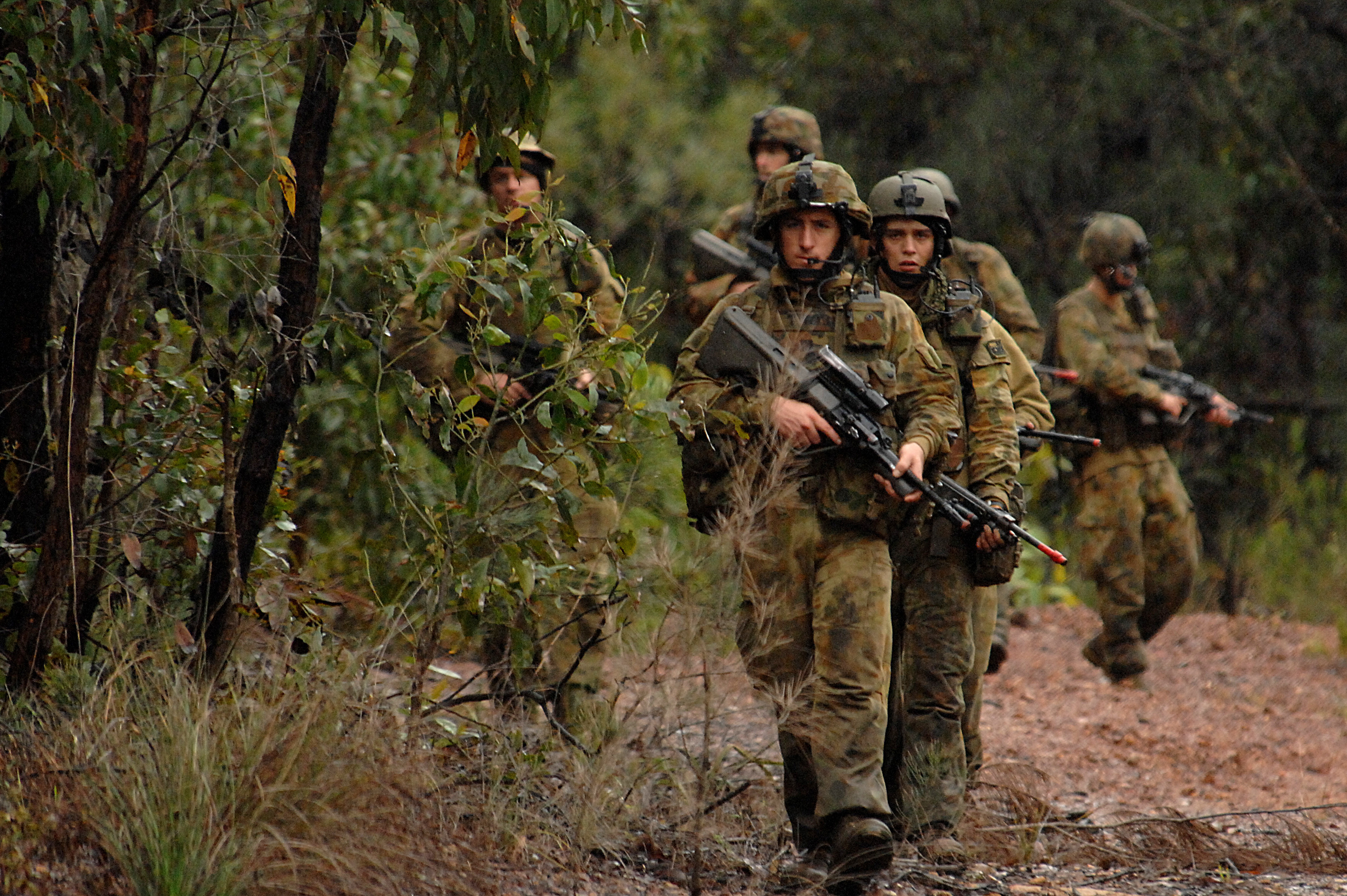
2 RAR soldiers during Exercise Talisman Sabre in 2007

=== East Timor (2001–2002) ===
In October 2001, 2 RAR returned to East Timor, known as AUSBATT V of UNTAET, taking over from 4 RAR (AUSBATT IV) and serving a relatively uneventful tour, handing over to 3 RAR (Para) (AUSBATT VI) in April 2002. The mission in East Timor concluded for the RAR Battalion's in 2004.

=== Solomon Islands (2003–2004) ===
In July 2003, amidst an outbreak of lawlessness, violence and civil unrest in the Solomon Islands, 2 RAR was deployed as part of a Combined Joint Task Force following a request for assistance from the Solomon Islands government. Under the auspices of the United Nations Regional Assistance Mission to Solomon Islands (RAMSI), a two hundred strong reinforced company group based on 2 RAR was deployed to help support civilian police re-establish law and order as part of Operation Anode. during this initial rotation which included, BHQ, C Coy, elements of Admin Company and Support Company's Plus D Company CHQ plus 10 PL from 2 RAR with Tongan and Papuan PL's to make Pacific Islands Coy. This rotation concluded in November 2003.

A further rotation based around B Coy CHQ and 6 PL from 2 RAR as part of RESFOR Coy from November 2003 to May 2004 occurred. The last rotation from 2 RAR A Coy CHQ and 2 PL as part of Response Force Company (RESFOR Coy) from May 2004 till December 2004.

=== Iraq (2003–2019) ===
Following the invasion of Iraq in 2003, 2 RAR provided Platoons to the security force protecting the Australian embassy in Baghdad – SECDET. The first deployment came in May with 2003 when 5 Platoon, B Company deployed on SECDET 1 with elements of 2nd Cavalry Regiment. 1 Platoon, A Company deployed on the next rotation, SECDET II over the period September 2003 - January 2004 before handing over to A Coy, 3 RAR. during SECDET II, it was reinforced with a section from 3 RAR and this started the A And B rotations to SECDET allowing overlap.

In May 2006, 2 RAR's Headquarters, support company and a rifle company deployed to Iraq as part of the third rotation of the Al Muthanna Task Group.

The battalion provided a sniper pair to SECDET XIV and then battalion conducted a final SECDET in 2009–2010 when 2 RAR Bravo Company (minus) deployed as SECDET XV.

With shift to training missions in IRAQ, the battalion contributed a sniper pair to Task Group Taji 6 (TGT 6) in 2017 to 2018 and then provided a platoon to TGT 8 in 2018 to 2019. Rotations to Iraq by soldiers of the RAR concluded with TGT 10 in 2020.

=== Border protection (2004) ===
From July to November 2004, 2 RAR provided troops to OP RELEX II – Transit Security Element 34 (TSE 34), consisting of 54 persons from A Coy from 2 RAR (3PL and 1 section from Bravo Company, 2 RAR plus an MP SGT, CPL and LT and A Coy 2IC and CSM), then a few were re-tasked to OP CRANBERRY for a short time.

=== Timor Leste (2006 until 2010) ===
In May 2006, Timor Leste (as East Timor has since become) asked for Australian assistance once more. As social, political and ethnic differences threatened to divide the country amidst a resurgence of violence, a new UN mission, United Nations Integrated Mission in East Timor (UNMIT) was established. As a part of Australia's continued commitment to the fledgling nation, a battle group, known as Battle Group Faithful was created, due to the manpower shortage in the RAR at the time. This had been forewarned and practised the year before (2005) with 2 RAR as the mounting unit, however in 2006, 2 RAR BHQ and A Company were being committed to a battle group in southern Iraq, so the mounting unit was 3 RAR, who provide most of BHQ and Admin Company. A Company came from 1 RAR A Coy, B Company came from 3 RAR B Coy, C Company came from 2 RAR C Coy, D Company was made from 2 RAR SPT Coy, Support Company was made up of combined elements with 3 RAR CHQ. As an example, the sniper cell was made up by a supervisor and 2 pairs from 2 RAR, a pair from 1 RAR and a pair from 3 RAR. Truly a RAR effort to field the battle group. The battle group downsized and handed over to a 6 RAR led battle group (TLBG 1). Timor Leste Battle Group 1. Elements of C Company 2 RAR remained into TLBG 1

2 RAR deployed a sniper pair into the 1 RAR led TLBG 2 followed by a 2 RAR led TLBG 3 Battle Group Samichon. This battle group based upon 2 RAR deployed to Timor Leste between September 2007 to April 2008.

The battalion deployed for a further tour in May 2009 as Timor Leste Battle Group-VI this ANZAC Battle Group, it had a company of Kiwis deployed as part of the rotation, conducted security and stability operations as well as training for deployment to Afghanistan the following year.

=== Afghanistan (2006 to 2020) ===
2 RAR first deployed troops into Afghanistan with the first rotation to Afghanistan of RAR soldier on RTF 1. 2 RAR sent a sniper pair as part of this rotation. During RTF 2, a requirement of mortars eventuated and 2 RAR rapidly deployed a section of mortars to support the 1 RAR led RTF 2. These soldiers remained and served supporting RTF 3. From September 2007 to May 2008, elements of the battalion deployed to Afghanistan on Operation Slipper as part of RTF-3. The Security Task Group (STG) was made up of infantrymen from C Company 2 RAR, mortarmen and snipers from Support Company 2 RAR, IMV crews from 6 RAR and B Squadron, 3/4 Cavalry Regiment, cavalrymen from 2/14 LHR(QMI) and gunners from 4th Field Regiment. Elements from these units combined with elements of the 3rd Combat Engineer Regiment to form a combat team. The role of the STG was to provide the firepower and mobility necessary to facilitate the engineers' protected reconstruction. Intimately supported by combat engineers, construction engineers and explosive ordnance disposal technicians to make up Combat Team (CT) Spear, the STG was the fundamental enabler for the protected reconstruction effort.

The combat team conducted five major operations during its deployment, effectively expanding the ISAF and ANSF's permanent influence in the Chora Valley and into the Baluchi Pass. The combat team sustained casualties early in the deployment with Trooper David 'Poppy' Pearce being killed by an IED in the Dorufshan and Sergeant Michael Lyddiard being seriously wounded whilst defusing an IED in the Chora Valley. The combat team was able to take the fight to the enemy during several engagements, most notably in the Sorkh Morghab region where all elements of the combat team engaged the enemy over several days allowing the construction of a patrol base and the Afghan Army to move into an area previously considered a Taliban stronghold.

In June to September 2009, 2 RAR deployed a composite security section (SECDET) to provide support to Special Operation Task Groups 9 and 10 (SOTG IX and X) Rotation for CAMP Russell Security.

In June 2011, the battalion deployed to Urozgan Province, Afghanistan as the Battle Group Headquarters and Combat Teams of Mentoring Task Force Three (MTF-3). This included the Battle of Doan as well as many other engagements with the Taliban. The battalion returned to Australia in February 2012. MTF 3 handed over responsibility for the mission to the soldiers from the Brisbane-based 8/9 RAR who made up MTF 4 on 24 January 2012. Two members of the battalion, Private Matthew Lambert and Lance Corporal Luke Gavin, were killed during this rotation. LCPL Gavin was killed during the largest green on blue experienced by Australian Forces.

In August 2019 in support of OP HIGHROAD, 2 RAR (Amphib) provided 3 Platoon, A Coy, 2 RAR (Amphib) to 8/9 RAR's led rotation of Force Protection Element 12 (FPE 12) – Plus 4 soldiers to the TAC – Air element.

FPE 12 was replaced with FPE 13 in February 2020. Due to COVID and the further downsizing of Operations in Afghanistan, only a section from 2 RAR (Amphib) deployed as part of a to a 5 RAR Platoon. This last formed element of 2 RAR (Amphib) returned from Afghanistan in September 2020.

2 RAR and 2 RAR (Amphib) have deployed some individuals to Afghanistan on rotations, with the most notable being CPL Justin Huggett M.G. who was on EX Long Look and deployed with his exchange Unit, The Grenadier Guards as part of Operation Herrick. For his Actions on this deployment he was awarded a MG. The last person from 2 RAR (Amphib) to deploy was the XO at the time who helped with the withdrawal in 2021

=== Restructure under Plan Beersheba ===
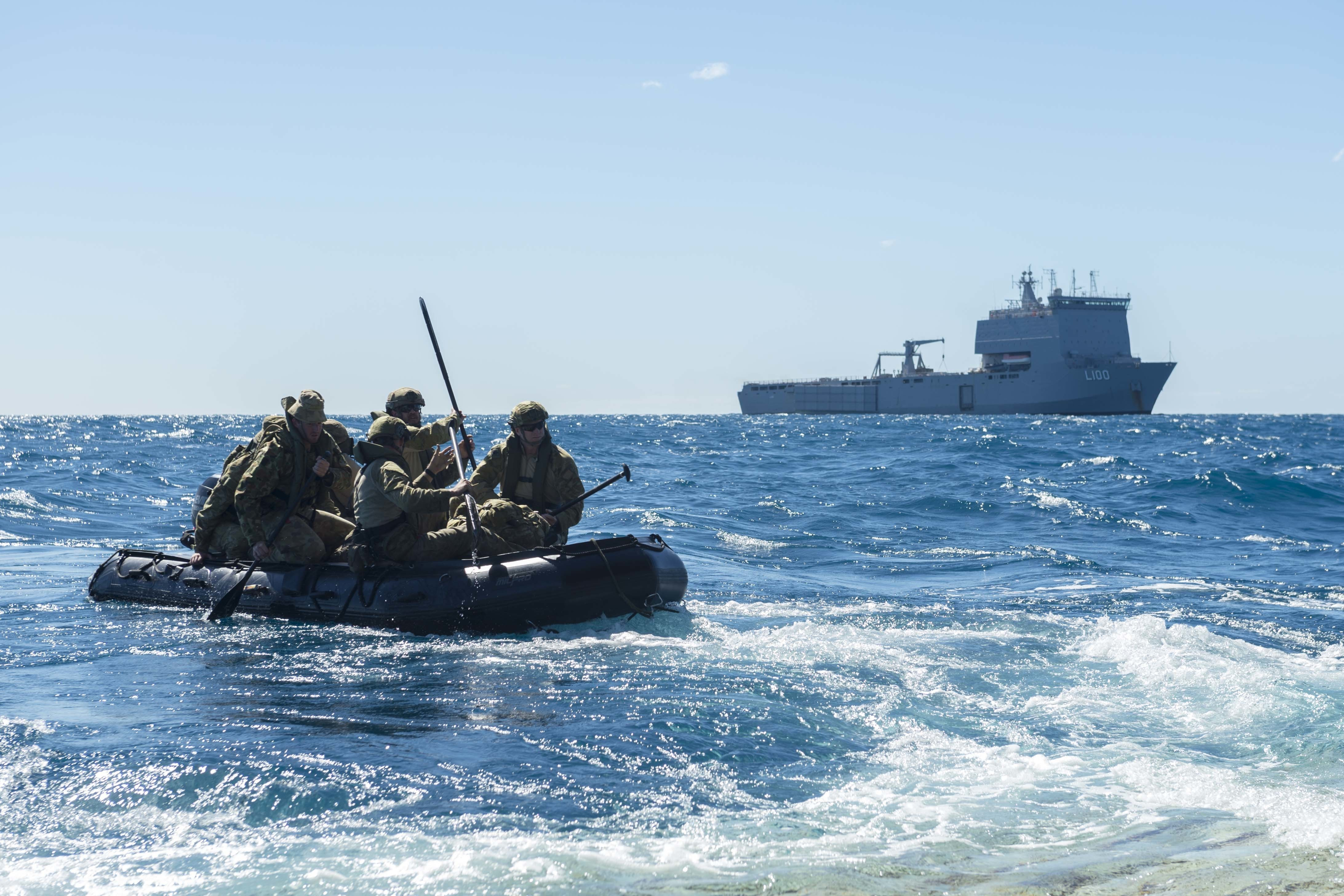
2 RAR soldiers using a combat rubber raiding craft during an exercise in 2017

Under a restructuring program known as Plan Beersheba announced in late 2011, 2 RAR has formed the core of the Army's amphibious force. This has seen 108th Battery relocate from 4th Regiment, Royal Australian Artillery to 2 RAR as a sub-unit, being the only full-time infantry battalion with its own organic artillery battery.

On 15 October 2017, 2 RAR (Amphib) transferred from the 3rd Brigade to report directly to the headquarters of the 1st Division. The battalion remains based at Lavarack Barracks in Townsville, and became the division's specialist amphibious infantry battalion. The battalion's primary role is to provide specialist capabilities to conduct pre-landing activities for other elements of the Army. It includes small boat operators and reconnaissance and sniper teams as well as command, communications and logistics elements. 2 RAR has a strength of around 350 personnel, which is smaller than the other RAR's infantry battalions.

A 2017 article in the Australian Infantry Magazine stated that in its specialist role, 2 RAR "will be responsible for amphibious reconnaissance and surveillance, small boat operations, battle space shaping and limited scale raiding in support of a Joint Amphibious Task Force". The battalion's main function will be to collect information for the commander of the ADF's Amphibious Task Group and other decision-makers. It is to be responsible for reconnoitering and seizing beaches, helicopter landing zones and airfields for the Australian Amphibious Force's main ground combat element. Following the completion of amphibious operations, the battalion will either re-embark or remain ashore as a reconnaissance unit. In the latter role, it is to be capable of conducting reconnaissance patrols well behind enemy lines and providing information to other units.

As part of this change, 2 RAR (Amphib) transitioned to a new structure in January 2018 which comprises a battalion headquarters, a security company with four infantry platoons, a support company and an administration company. The battalion is planned to generally deploy as the main element of the Australian Amphibious Force's Joint Pre-Landing Force (JPLF). It is planned that the 2 RAR (Amphib) elements generally assigned to the Pre-Landing Force (PLF) will be a command and control node, elements from the Reconnaissance and Sniper and Small Boat Platoons, two infantry platoons, a joint fires team and a signals detachment. The JPLF will also comprise Army geospatial and survey teams, electronic warfare teams, amphibious beach teams, Royal Australian Navy clearance divers and other specialist elements. Other elements of the Army, including an infantry battalion, form the Amphibious Ready Group's Ground Combat Element (GCE), and rotate through this role on an annual basis.

=== DCAC – OP Yasi Assist (2011) ===
2 RAR rear details assist in the Cyclone Yasi aftermath

=== Fiji (2016) (2020–2021) ===
In 2016 as part of OP Fiji Assist, Joint Task Force 635 (JTF 635), 2 RAR (Amphib) deployed BHQ, Admin and SPT Coy to join with Engineers from Brisbane Units to help after the devastation of Cyclone Winston.

In 2020/2021 as part of OP Fiji Assist 20-21, B Coy, 2 RAR (Amphib) was recalled with only 6 Platoon (Small Boats) deployed along with Command Element (Coy 2IC and Amphib WO) to Fiji on HMAS Adelaide to help after Cyclone YASA impacted.

=== DCAC - OP Queensland Assist (2017) ===
Soldiers allotted to this Engineer led group for clean-up in Airlie Beach after Cyclone Debbie

=== Papua New Guinea (2018) ===
Some 2 RAR (Amphib) soldiers deployed on OP APEC 18 Assist, these were 4 Platoon from A Coy, 2 RAR (Amphib), which deployed on HMAS Canberra in Support of APEC in Port Moresby

=== DCAC - OP North Queensland Flood Assist (2019) ===
2 RAR (Amphib) is recalled, and 83 members are allotted to JTF 658 to assist with flooding in Townsville, most notable, small boats rescues over 400 people from flood-stricken houses in Idalia. All members allotted are granted a Group Gold level commendation for their efforts

=== Philippines (2019) ===
2 RAR (Amphib) provided members to the Land Mobile Training Team (Land MTT). 2 RAR (Amphib) provided a HQ element, A Platoon of CB Shooting Instructors, A Sniper Pair Training Team and some support personnel. In three rotations.

=== South Pacific (2020) ===
2 RAR (Amphib) provides 14 soldiers as part of the annual Operation (OP RENDER SAFE 2019) from Alpha Coy, 4 Platoon (Small Boats). They deploy HMAS Adelaide and HMAS Canberra (mostly), to the Solomon Islands, Tonga and Fiji

=== Tonga (2022) ===
A Task force was dispatched after the eruption of underwater volcano Hunga Tonga- Hunga Ha’apai on 15 January. 3 Platoon (Small Boats) from 2 RAR (Amphib) was dispatched as part of a JTF

=== DCAC – OP NSW Flood Assist (2022) ===
25 combined members from 4 and 5 platoon, B Coy with the 2IC of B Coy as the commander attached to JTF 629.1\

=== Vanuatu (2023) ===
As part of OP VANUATU ASSIST 2023, 6 Platoon (Small boats) deployed as part of a JTF to deliver more than 100 tonnes of humanitarian aid, including food, shelter and medical supplies, to the country in the wake of Tropical Cyclones Judy and Kevin

== Current composition ==
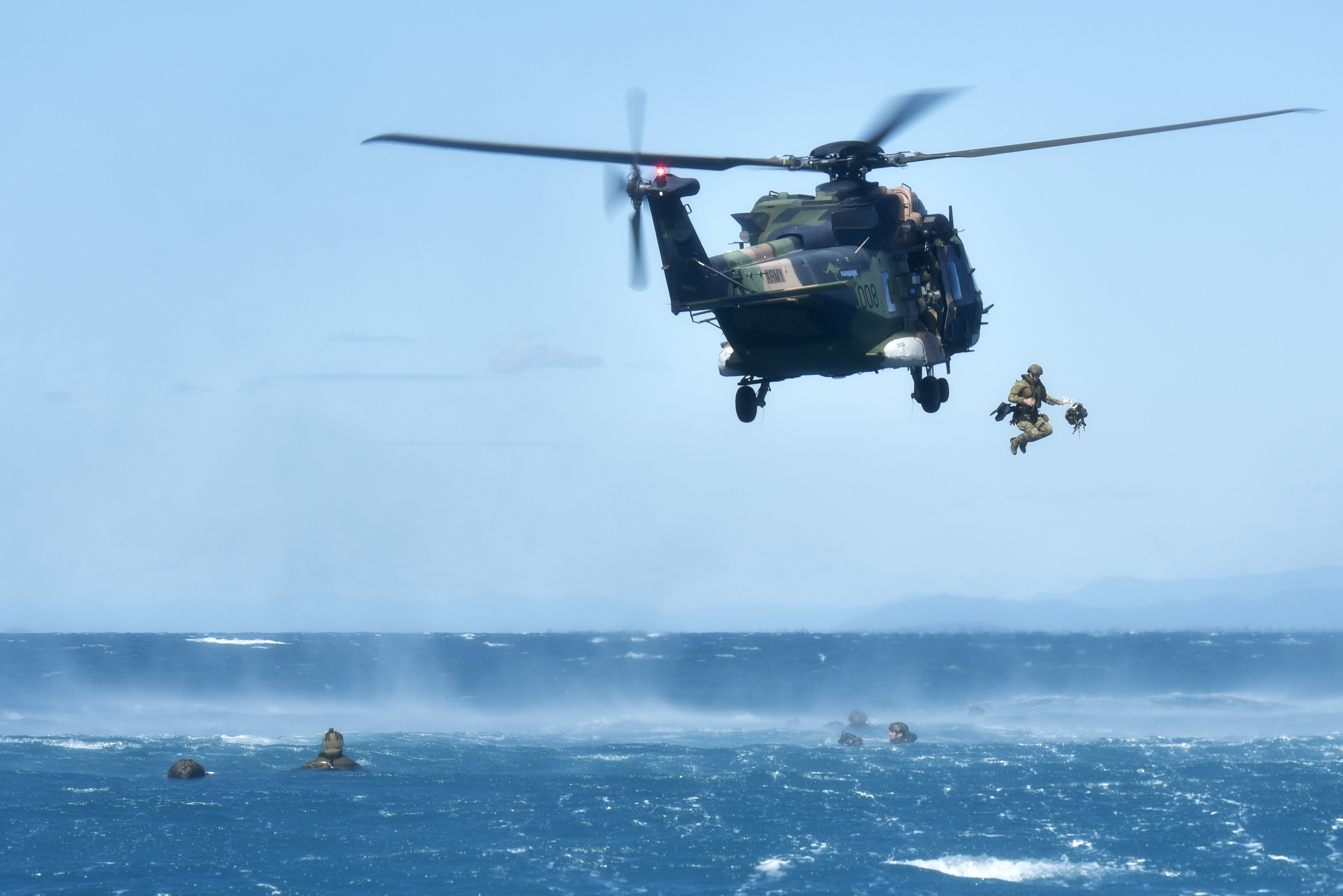
2 RAR (Amphib) soldiers helocasting from a MRH-90 helicopter during Exercise Sea Series 2018

As of 2014, 2 RAR consisted of:

- Battalion Headquarters
- 2 Rifle Companies – 'A' & 'B'
- Support Company
  - Small Boat Platoon
- Administration Company
- 108th Battery (Observation Post) – 4th Regiment, Royal Australian Artillery

Since January 2018, 2 RAR has comprised:

- Battalion headquarters
- 'A' Company
  - Four infantry platoons
- Intelligence, Surveillance, and Reconnaissance Company
  - Reconnaissance and Sniper Platoon
  - Small Boat Platoon
  - Signals Platoon
  - Joint Fires Team
- Administration Company

== Battle and theatre honours ==
- Korea: Korea 1950–53, Samichon.
- Vietnam: Vietnam, Bien-Hoa, Coral–Balmoral.
- East Timor: East Timor 1999–2003
- Iraq: Iraq 2003–11

== Commanding officers ==
The following table provides details of 2 RAR's commanding officers:

	Dates	Name
66 Aust Inf Bn:	16 October 1945 – June 1947	LTCOL G.E. Colvin DSO, ED
2 AR:	23 November 1948 – 10 January 1949	LTCOL S.C. Graham, MC
2 RAR (from 10 March 1949):	11 January 1949 – 12 December 1950	LTCOL C.A.E. Fraser MBE
	8 January 1951 – 12 June 1952	LTCOL R.L. Hughes CBE
	13 June 1952 – 30 September 1952	LTCOL M.A. Austin DSO
	1 October 1952 – 12 September 1954	LTCOL G.F. Larkin OBE
	22 October 1954 – 4 November 1957	LTCOL J.G. Ochiltree OBE
	5 November 1957 – 14 November 1958	LTCOL W.G. Henderson, OBE
	15 January 1959 – 17 April 1960	LTCOL A.S. Mann DSO
	18 April 1960 – 31 May 1961	COL K.R.G. Coleman MC
	1 June 1961 – 19 August 1963	LTCOL A.B. Stretton MBE
	30 August 1963 – 13 December 1964	COL O.D. Jackson OBE
	14 December 1964 – 31 May 1965	COL K.A. Peddle
	1 June 1965 – 26 January 1967	LTCOL A.W.F. Rofe
	27 January 1967 – 5 September 1968	LTCOL N.R. Charlesworth DSO
	6 September 1968 – 10 January 1972	LTCOL J.M. Church DSO
Linked with 4 RAR	11 January 1972 – 14 August 1973	LTCOL J.A. Sheldrick
Delinked from 2/4 RAR	1 February 1995 – 3 December 1996	LTCOL R.G. Wilson
	3 December 1996 – 8 December 1998	LTCOL D.L Morrison
	8 December 1998 – 1 December 2000	LTCOL M.Slater DSC, CSC
	1 December 2000 – 13 January 2003	LTCOL A.J Campbell AM
	14 January 2003 – 3 December 2004	LTCOL J. J. Frewen AM
	4 December 2004 – 6 December 2006	LTCOL M. Mahy DSC
	December 2006 – December 2008	LTCOL B. James
	December 2008 – December 2010	LTCOL David Smith AM
	December 2010 – December 2013	LTCOL C. Smith DSC, CSC
	December 2013 – December 2016	LTCOL M. Bassingthwaighte DSM
	December 2016 – December 2018	LTCOL D. Pashley
	December 2018 – December 2020	LTCOL J. Finger CSC
	December 2020 – 2022	LTCOL M. Tutton
	January 2023 – December 2024	LTCOL J. Wick
	December 2024 – till present	LTCOL L. Holloway

== Alliances ==
- United Kingdom – Coldstream Guards

== See also ==
- Royal Australian Regiment
- Military history of Australia during the Korean War
- Military history of Australia during the Vietnam War
