= 3rd Brigade (Australia) =

Formation of the Australian Army

- Active: 1903–1906; 1912–1919; 1921–1944; 1967–present
- Country: Australia
- Branch: Australian Army
- Type: Combined arms
- Size: 3,500 personnel
- Part of: 1st (Australian) Division
- Garrison/HQ: Townsville, Queensland
- Motto: "First Ashore"
- Engagements: World War I; World War II; Somalia; Cambodia; Rwanda; Solomon Islands; East Timor; Iraq; Afghanistan; 2021 Solomon Islands unrest

Commanders
- Notable commanders: Gordon Bennett; Peter Arnison; Peter Leahy; Mark Evans; Mark Kelly; David Morrison; Mick Slater; John Caligari; Robert Winning

Insignia
- Unit colour patch

The 3rd Brigade is an armoured unit of the Australian Army that is tasked for amphibious operations in conjunction with the Royal Australian Navy. Initially raised in 1903 as part of the post-Federation Australian Army, it was removed from the order of battle in 1906 following the restructure of the field force. It was re-formed in 1914 for service during World War I, taking part in the fighting at Gallipoli and on the Western Front in Europe. During World War II the brigade was used in a defensive role before it was disbanded in 1944. It was re-raised in 1967 for service during the Vietnam War and later went on to provide the nucleus of the deployment to East Timor during the Australian-led intervention in 1999. The brigade is currently based at Lavarack Barracks in Townsville, Queensland.

== History ==
=== Post-Federation ===
Following the Federation of Australia in 1901, the structure of the new Australian Army was approved in 1903. Included in the new field force were three infantry brigades of both militia and volunteer personnel, each of which consisted of four infantry regiments, three field artillery batteries, a company of engineers, as well as a field hospital and veterinary and supply units in support. The 1st Brigade was raised in New South Wales and the 2nd in Victoria, each consisting primarily of troops recruited from those states respectively, while the 3rd Brigade was based in Queensland from troops based in the remaining states of Queensland, Tasmania, South Australian and Western Australia. Units of the brigade included 9th, 10th, 11th and 12th Australian Infantry Regiments. However, by 1906 the field force had been restructured into just two infantry brigades, along with five light horse and four mixed brigades. As a consequence the 3rd Brigade was removed from the Australian Army's order of battle, and its units became part of the mixed Queensland Infantry Brigade established at that time. In 1912, following the introduction of the compulsory training scheme, the brigade was assigned to the 1st Military District. At this time, the brigade's constituent units were located across south-east Queensland and northern New South Wales including Brisbane, Ipswich, Toowoomba, Warwick, Lismore, Casino and Grafton.

=== World War I ===
The 3rd Brigade was re-formed in August 1914, as part of the Australian Imperial Force (AIF) which was raised for service overseas during World War I. As part of the 1st Division, the brigade consisted of four infantry battalions—the 9th, 10th, 11th and 12th Battalions— which were drawn from Queensland, South Australia, Western Australia and Tasmania.

The brigade was initially commanded by a British regular officer, Colonel Ewen Sinclair-Maclagan. After being deployed to Egypt where they undertook further training, the brigade was committed to the fighting in the Gallipoli campaign, being the first Australian unit to land at Anzac Cove on 25 April 1915. They subsequently remained on the peninsula until the end of the campaign in December 1915, taking part in a number of battles including the landing at Suvla Bay and the fighting at Lone Pine and Sari Bair. Following the conclusion of the campaign the brigade was withdrawn and returned to Egypt where a period of reorganisation was undertaken. During this time the AIF was expanded by raising new infantry battalions from cadre personnel drawn from experienced units and bringing in newly trained recruits from Australia. Personnel from the 3rd Brigade were used to raise the 13th Brigade, 4th Division.

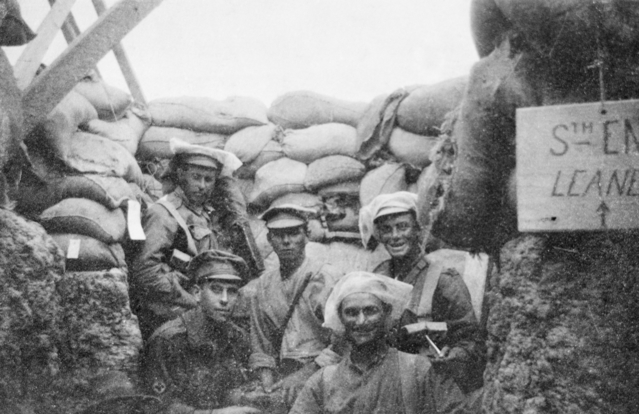
3rd Brigade soldiers at Gallipoli in August 1915

Following this, the decision was made to transfer the AIF to Europe to take part in the fighting along the Western Front. In March 1916 the 3rd Brigade, along with the rest of the I Anzac Corps embarked from Egypt bound for France. On 23 July 1916, the brigade took part in its first major battle when it was committed to the fighting on the Somme at Pozières, where the Australian 1st Division advanced 1,000 yards (910 m), capturing the village. In December 1916, Sinclair-MacLagan handed over command to Brigadier General Gordon Bennett, who led the brigade for the rest of the war. Later, throughout 1917 and 1918 battles were fought Bullecourt, Ypres, Menin Road, Passchendale, Hazebrouck, Amiens and along the Hindenburg Line before the fighting came to an end in November 1918.

=== Interwar and World War II ===
Following the war, the 3rd Brigade was disbanded in 1919, however the brigade was later re-raised as part the Citizens Force (which later became known as the Militia). Initially the brigade was based in Brisbane, Queensland, however, in 1921, following a reorganisation of the Australia's part-time military forces, later the brigade was re-allocated to the 4th Division and, consisting of the 10th, 27th, 43rd and 50th Battalions, it was headquartered in Adelaide, South Australia.

In September 1939, following the outbreak of World War II, the Australian government decided to raise an all volunteer force for service overseas during the war. This decision was based upon the provisions of the Defence Act (1903) which precluded sending members of the Militia outside of Australian territory to fight. Meanwhile, the Militia was tasked with home defence, and the 3rd Brigade was assigned a command reserve role within Southern Command. At this time, units of the Militia were called upon to undertake defensive duties and to provide training for men that were called up for national service following the recommencement of the compulsory training scheme in January 1940. Initially this was undertaken in small blocks of continuous training, however, following Japan's entry into the war following the bombing of Pearl Harbor and the invasion of Malaya in December 1941, the 3rd Brigade was mobilised for wartime service.

Following this the brigade, consisting of the 10th, 27th, 43rd and 48th Battalions, was attached to the Northern Territory Force and sent to Darwin to defend the port against a possible Japanese invasion. Initially, only the 27th and 43rd Battalions were sent to Darwin, while the 3rd Brigade headquarters and 48th Battalion remained in Adelaide, and the 10th Battalion joined the Adelaide Covering Force. In early1943, brigade headquarters deployed north, and the 48th Battalion was transferred to Victoria to join the 6th Brigade.

In March 1943, as the threat of invasion diminished, the brigade was re-allocated to the 4th Division and was withdrawn to Adelaide, before moving to Queensland in July 1944. Here, the brigade concentrated around Townsville, assuming a defensive role across an area that stretched as far as Cape York. The brigade subsequently became a direct command unit of the First Army, and was bolstered with the 6th Field Regiment and the 1st Independent Light Horse Squadron. The 27th Battalion was later transferred to the 23rd Brigade, but was replaced by the 62nd Battalion following its return from Merauke. The brigade was disbanded in April 1944, as part of the reduction of Australian forces that had begun in late 1942 in an effort to release manpower back into the Australian economy. Upon disbandment, the brigade consisted of two infantry battalions, the 55th/53rd and the 62nd Battalions. While the 62nd Battalion was disbanded at this time, along with the 3rd Brigade's headquarters, the 55th/53rd Battalion remained in existence as a direct command unit of the First Army.

=== Post-war deployments ===
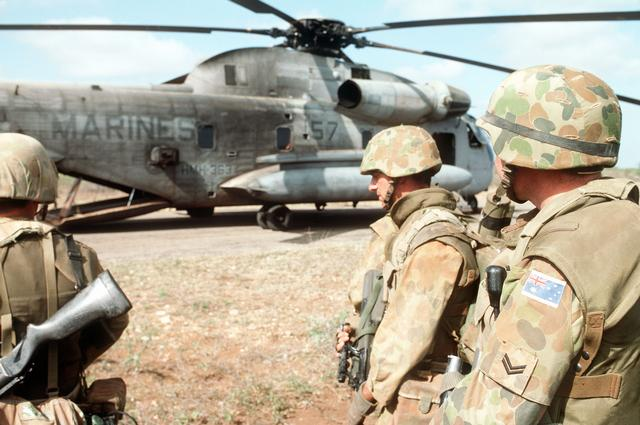
1RAR soldiers prepare to board a United States Marine Corps helicopter in Somalia

When Australia's military began reforming in 1948, the brigade was not initially re-raised under the reduced establishment that was adopted at the time. In 1967, however, the brigade was returned to the order of battle, albeit under the guise of the 3rd Task Force, as part of the expansion of the Australian Army during the Vietnam War. Based at Lavarack Barracks in Townsville and under the command of Brigadier E. Logan, the 3rd Task Force was made up of three infantry battalions—the 1st, 2nd and 4th Battalions, Royal Australian Regiment—as well as one squadron from the 3rd Cavalry Regiment, the 4th Field Regiment and the 3rd Field Engineer Regiment. Although the task force did not deploy to Vietnam as a formed unit, most its component units were sent. In 1973, following the end of Australia's involvement in Vietnam, the 3rd Task Force was re-allocated to the 1st Division and later, in 1981, readopted the designation of the 3rd Brigade. During the 1980s the brigade served primarily as the Operational Deployment Force, which was tasked with providing a robust warfighting capability to the government available for rapid deployment anywhere in the world. In this capacity elements from the brigade took part in Operation Morris Dance in 1987, in response to a coup in Fiji.

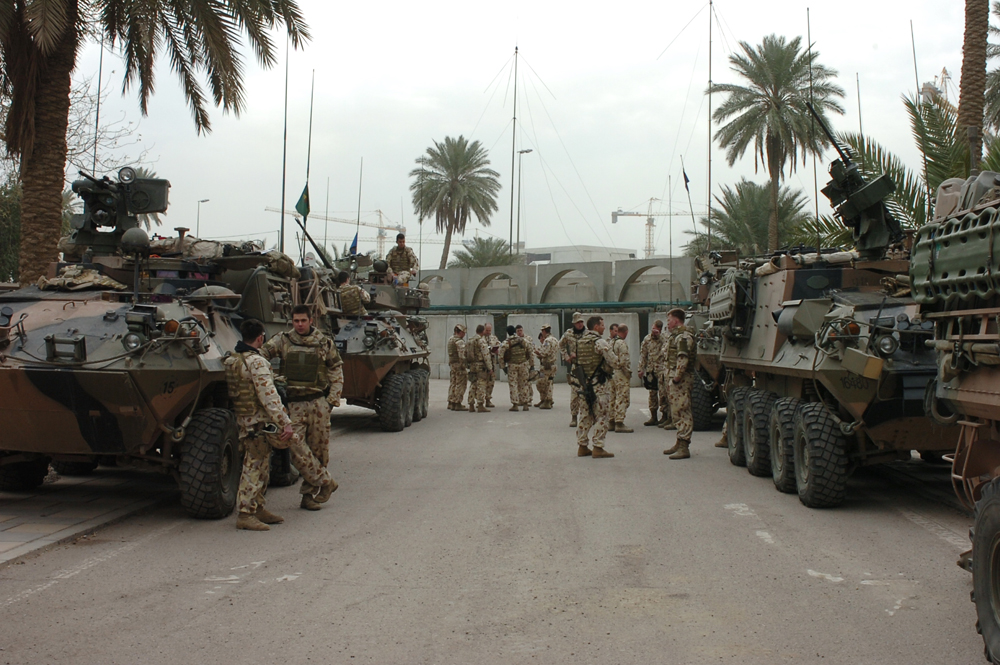
Personnel from SECDET X, which included members of 3rd Brigade, in Baghdad, March 2007

During the early 1990s, the brigade provided elements for a number of peacekeeping operations overseas. These included deployments to Somalia, Cambodia, Rwanda and Bougainville. In 1999, the brigade provided the majority of the Australian Army combat units that were initially deployed to International Force for East Timor (INTERFET)—the 2nd and 3rd Battalions, Royal Australian Regiment, and elements of the 3rd/4th Cavalry Regiment, the 4th Field Regiment and the 3rd Combat Engineer Regiment—with the brigade headquarters overseeing the force's operations along the tense East Timorese–Indonesian border. In May 2006 headquarters elements of the brigade, fundamentally personnel drawn from 3 RAR, deployed to East Timor to command all Australian forces operating in East Timor as part of Operation Astute, with subunits also provided by 1 and 2 RAR and the 4th Field Regiment (along with others drawn from outside the brigade).

The brigade is currently a combined arms formation and it fulfils the role of the Australian Army's ready deployment force on rotation. Recent operations have included deployments to Iraq as part of the Security Detachment Iraq (SECDET) and the Al Muthanna Task Group (AMTG-3), Afghanistan, and the Solomon Islands.

== Organisation ==
As of 2023 the 3rd Brigade has an authorised strength of 3,800 personnel and consists of the following units:

- Brigade Headquarters;
- 1st Battalion, Royal Australian Regiment (motorised infantry);
- 3rd Battalion, Royal Australian Regiment (mechanised infantry);
- 4th Regiment, Royal Australian Artillery (M777 Howitzer);
- 2nd Cavalry Regiment (armoured cavalry);
- 3rd Combat Service Support Battalion;
- 3rd Combat Engineer Regiment;
- 3rd Combat Signals Regiment.

The following units are not part of the brigade's establishment, but are tasked with supporting it:

- 5th Aviation Regiment;
- 10th Force Support Battalion;
- Joint Logistics Unit (NQ);
- Land Warfare Centre Detachment (NQ).

All of the brigade's units are based in Townsville, with 3 RAR re-locating from Sydney's Holsworthy Barracks in 2012. 3 RAR had previously formed the main combat elements of Australia's parachute battalion group. Under reforms announced in 2006, 3 RAR converted to a pure light infantry battalion and relocated to Townsville.

In late 2011, the Australian government announced that under a restructuring program known as Plan Beersheba, the 1st, 3rd and 7th Brigades would be reformed as combined arms multi-role manoeuvre brigades with the 2nd Battalion, Royal Australian Regiment (part of the 3rd Brigade) as the core of a future amphibious force (similar to the US Marine Corps). Under the plan, the 2nd Cavalry Regiment was transferred to the 3rd Brigade from the 1st in October–November 2014, transitioning to the ACR structure. As part of this transition, B Squadron, 3rd/4th Cavalry Regiment, which was previously assigned to the 3rd Brigade, was transferred to the 11th Brigade and re-raised as a Reserve unit.

As of mid-October 2017, the 3rd Brigade was reduced to two infantry battalions, with 2 RAR being transferred as a direct command unit of headquarters of the 1st Division, serving as a specialist amphibious warfare unit.
