= 3rd Combat Engineer Regiment (Australia) =

Australian Army engineer unit

- Country: Australia
- Branch: Army
- Type: Royal Australian Engineers (RAE)
- Role: Combat engineers
- Part of: 3rd Brigade, 1st Division
- Garrison/HQ: Lavarack Barracks, Townsville

Insignia
- Unit colour patch

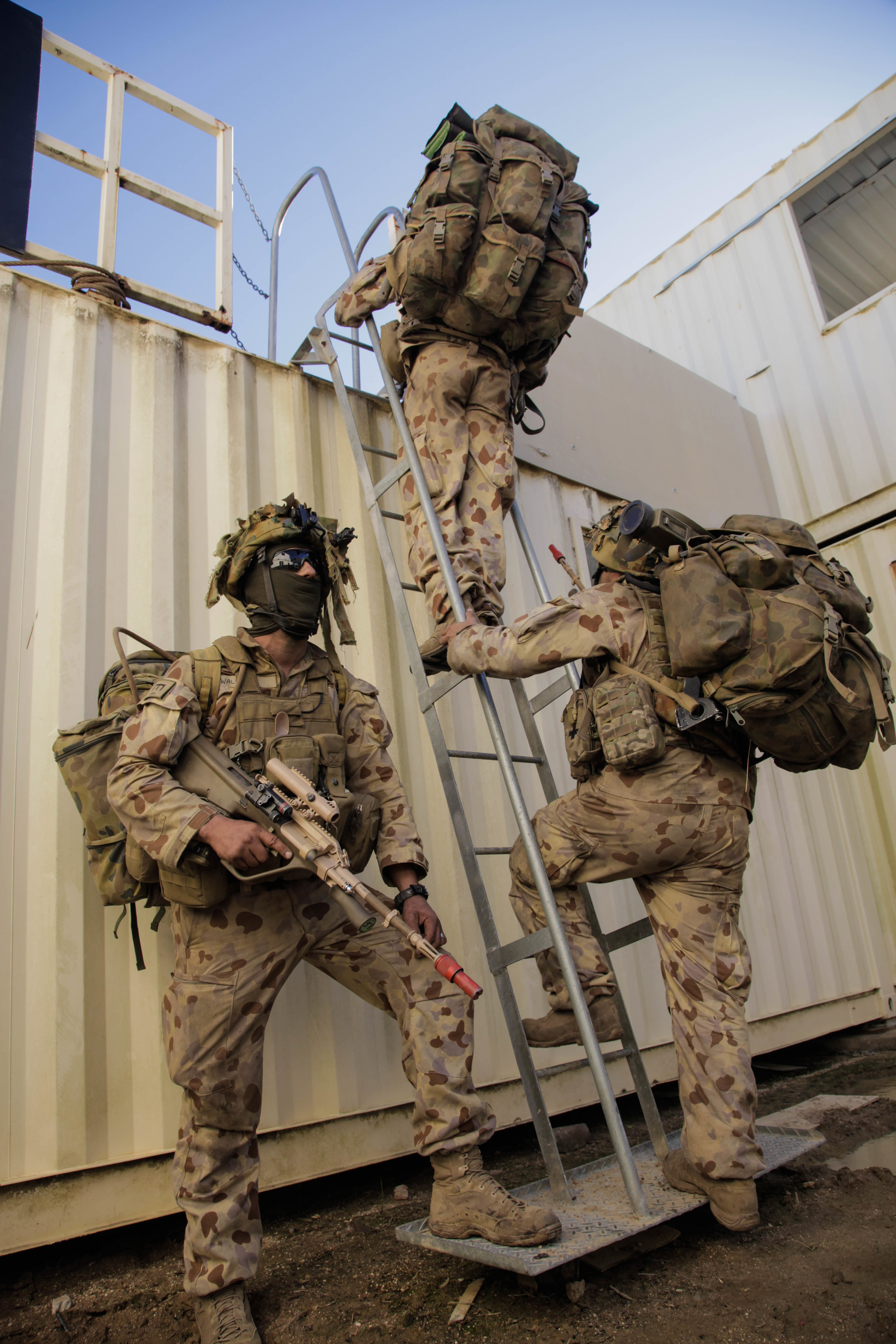
Soldiers from the 3rd Combat Engineer Regiment practice clearing a building in 2015

The 3rd Combat Engineer Regiment (3 CER) is an Australian Army modular engineer regiment trained for sapper/combat engineer operations. The unit is based at Lavarack Barracks in Townsville, Queensland and is part of the 3rd Brigade. It has deployed to Somalia as part of Operation Solace, Bougainville as part of the South Pacific Peacekeeping Force, to the Solomon Islands under Operation Anode, and has also served in Timor-Leste, Iraq and Afghanistan.

== Structure ==
The regiment consists of:

- Regimental Headquarters
- 16 Combat Engineer Squadron
- 18 Combat Engineer Squadron
- 25 Support Squadron
- Operational Support Squadron
