= Lavarack Barracks =

Australian Army Base in Townsville

Lavarack Barracks (HLS)
- IATA: none; ICAO: YLVK

Summary
- Airport type: Military
- Operator: Australian Army
- Location: Townsville, Queensland
- Elevation AMSL: 31 ft / 10 m
- Coordinates: 19°19′18″S 146°48′06″E
- Interactive map of Lavarack Barracks (HLS)
- Built: 1965/66

Lavarack Barracks (ICAO: YLVK) is a major Australian Army base located in the suburb of Murray in the City of Townsville, Queensland, Australia. Lavarack Barracks is currently home to the Army's 3rd Brigade and 11th Brigade. Elements of the 3rd Brigade based at the Barracks include the Combat Signals Regiment, 3rd Combat Services Support Battalion, the 1st, 2nd and 3rd Battalions of the Royal Australian Regiment and the 2nd Cavalry Regiment. The barracks are named after Lieutenant General Sir John Lavarack, an Australian Army officer during both World Wars and Governor of Queensland from 1946 to 1957.

== Early history ==
Defence force expansion was on the Australian Government's agenda in late 1964. Conflict in Southeast Asia inspired the Government to review Australia's defence capabilities and recommend that a new military base be constructed in Australia's north. Townsville quickly emerged as the favoured location. On 26 November 1964, the Minister for the Army, AJ Forbes, announced to Townsville’s civilian community on live television that construction on a new base among the northern slopes of Mount Stuart would soon begin. Nearly two years later on 29 July 1966 Lavarack Barracks was officially opened by the late Australian Prime Minister Harold Holt at a ceremony in Townsville.

Northern Australia historian Patrick White has suggested that the project to establish a new military base in Townsville resulted from a series of rapid decisions. White has also argued that 'fortuitous circumstances' contributed to Townsville becoming the location for what has become Australia's largest army base. These circumstances aligned a strategic military objective with a civilian development agenda.

Cold War tensions had escalated by November 1964 as the conflict in Vietnam had become increasingly violent. The United States had developed plans to deploy combat forces to Vietnam and had requested Australian support. Australia's Government scrambled to pull together its military resources and envisaged a long campaign in support of American initiatives to halt the spread of communism in Southeast Asia. To meet the Government's objective, investment in new military infrastructure was necessary. A new base in Australia's north had strategic appeal; the opportunity to train in terrain similar to that found in Southeast Asia and an increased efficiency to deploy troops to the region.

At the same time, public interest in the development of northern Australia was high. Population growth had been identified as a vital ingredient for development and relocating military personnel and their families to the north was considered a way to stimulate growth. The politics of northern development were a strong influence; there is evidence that military officials had preferred that the base be built in Victoria but Cabinet overruled this in favour of a northern location. Townsville's sudden emergence was a surprise to the local community and the rapidness of the project resulted in some disputes between various levels of government, the community and the military.

Eventually, the base was opened in 1966 and many of the Australian troops to serve in Vietnam had at some point been based at or transferred through Lavarack Barracks.

== Current Units ==
- 1st Division
  - 2nd Battalion, Royal Australian Regiment — Specialized for Amphibious operations
  - Combat Training Centre
- 3rd Brigade
  - 3rd Brigade Headquarters
    - 1st Battalion, Royal Australian Regiment
    - 2nd Cavalry Regiment
    - 3rd Battalion, Royal Australian Regiment
    - 3rd Combat Engineer Regiment
    - 3rd Combat Signals Regiment
    - 3rd Combat Service Support Battalion
    - 4th Regiment, Royal Australian Artillery
- 11th Brigade
  - 11th Brigade Headquarters
    - 141st Signal Squadron
    - 31st/42nd Battalion, Royal Queensland Regiment
    - 11th Combat Service Support Battalion

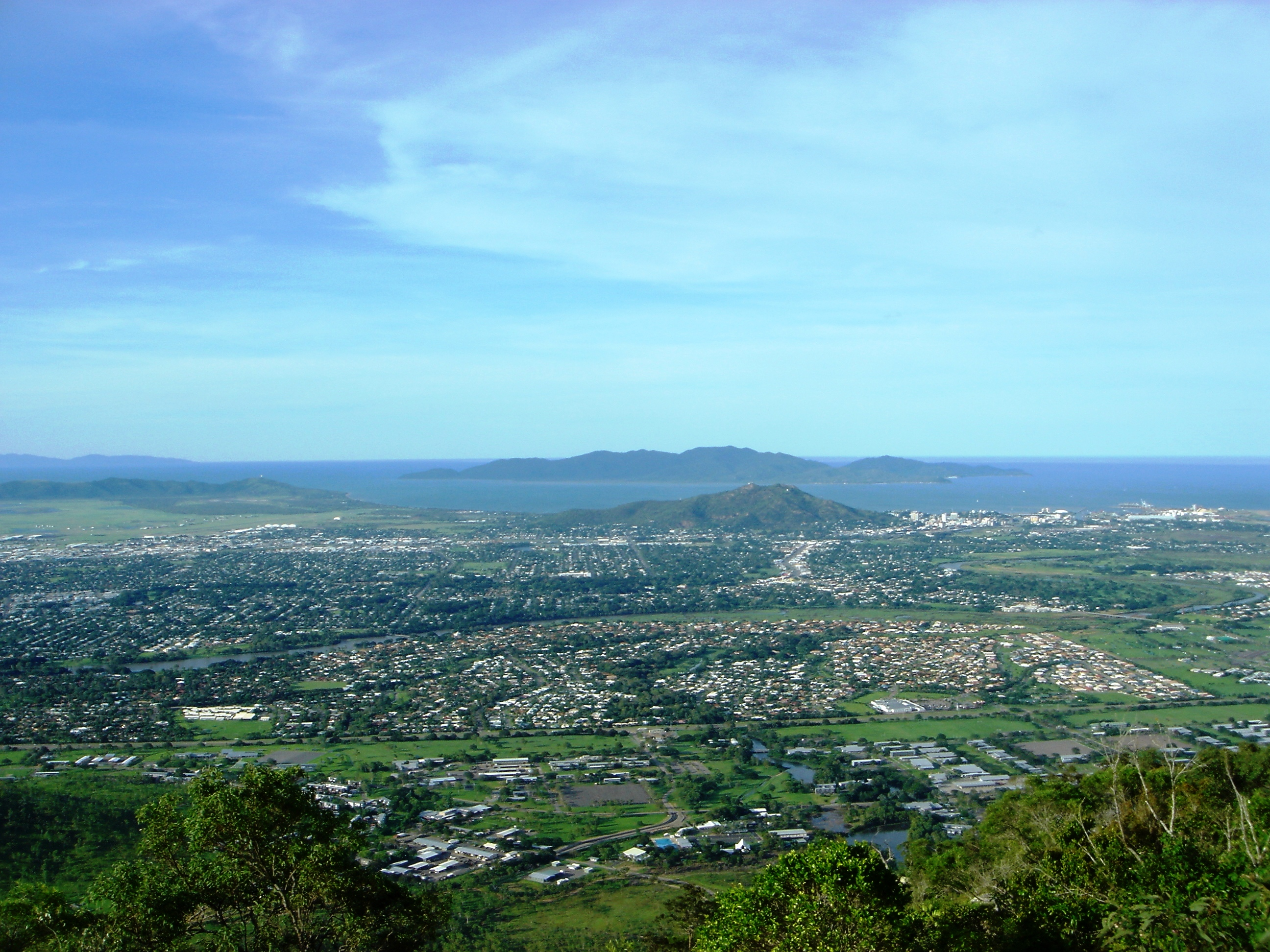
Part of Lavarack Barracks in the foreground, viewed from Mount Stuart, with Townsville CBD, Castle Hill and Magnetic Island in the distance

== Notes ==
=== References ===
- Jobson, Christopher (2009). Looking Forward, Looking Back: Customs and Traditions of the Australian Army. Wavell Heights, Queensland: Big Sky Publishing. ISBN 9780980325164.
- White, Patrick (2007). Townsville and Lavarack Barracks: The Early Years (Bachelor of Social Science thesis). James Cook University.
- White, Patrick (2015). "'A chain of fortuitous circumstances': the sudden rise of a military base in Townsville" (PDF). History in the Making. 4 (1): 65–78.
