= 2nd/4th Battalion, Royal Australian Regiment =

Former Australian Army infantry battalion

2nd/4th Battalion, The Royal Australian Regiment
- Active: 15 August 1973 – 1 February 1995
- Country: Australia
- Garrison/HQ: Lavarack Barracks, Townsville, Australia
- Colors: Black and Scarlet
- Anniversaries: 15 August (amalgamated); 1 February (de-linking)

The 2nd/4th Battalion Royal Australian Regiment (2/4 RAR) was an Australian Army infantry battalion. Throughout its existence 2/4 RAR was based at Lavarack Barracks in Townsville and formed part of the 3rd Task Force (3 TF) or as it is later known 3rd Brigade.

Elements of 2/4 RAR served in Malaysia as Rifle Company Butterworth from 1975 until 1989, Cambodia in 1993 and Rwanda in 1994. In addition, 53 personnel were attached to 1 RAR during Operation Solace which saw a battalion group based around 1 RAR deploy to Somalia in 1993.

== History ==
2/4 RAR Flag

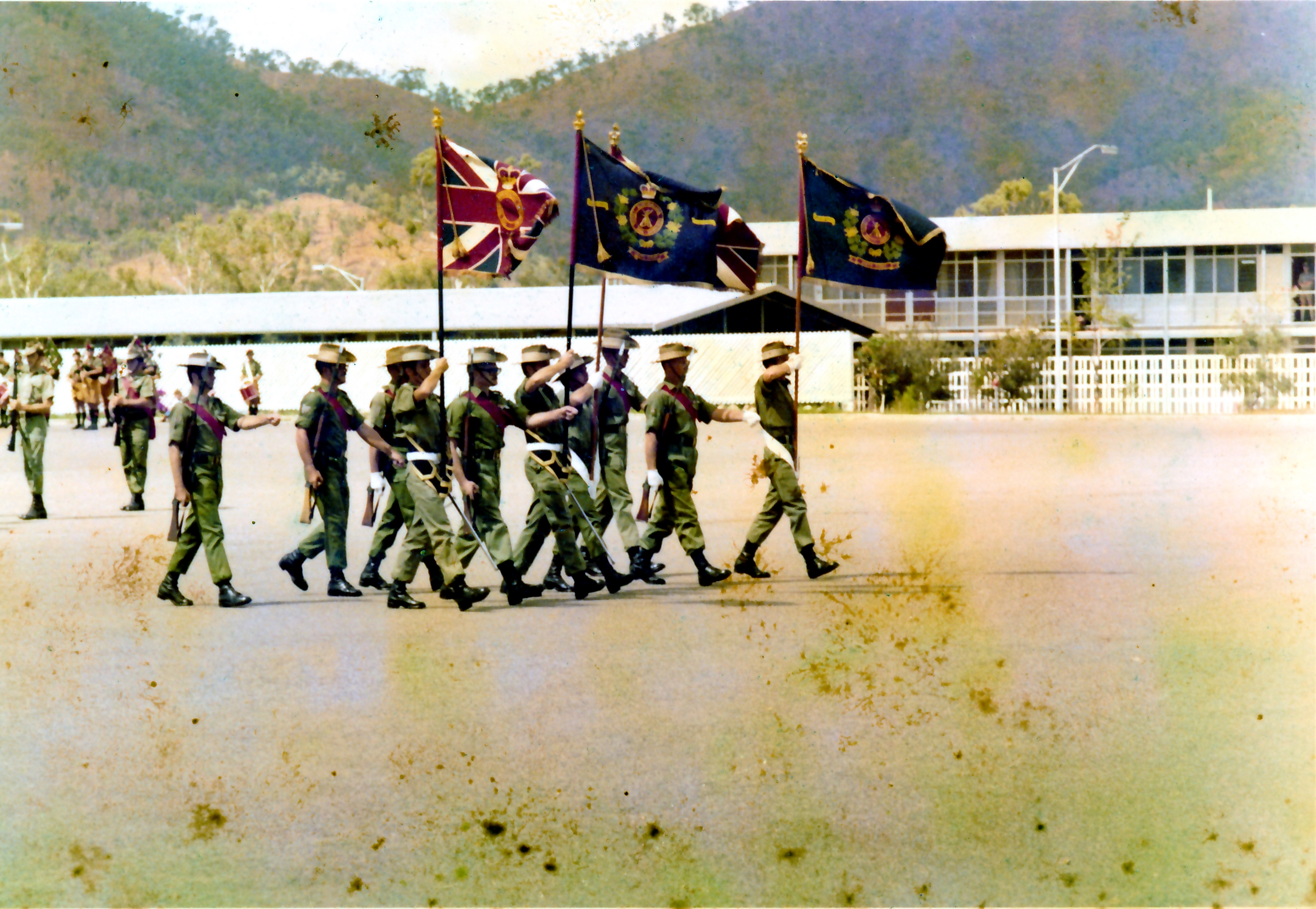
15 August 1973 - The linking of 2 RAR and 4 RAR to form 2/4 RAR

As part of the post-Vietnam War reduction of the Australian Army 2 RAR was combined with 4 RAR between 15 August 1973 and 1 February 1995 as the 2nd/4th Battalion, Royal Australian Regiment.

The linked Battalion occupied 4 RAR's lines in Lavarack Barracks upon formation, with the CO from 4 RAR becoming the CO of 2/4 RAR. The linked Battalions of the RAR were tasked with maintaining the customs and traditions from their original Battalions. Upon linking, a combined flag was raised, however the Battalion wore a combination of two lanyards sewn together. A braided lanyard was introduced in 1975.

2/4 RAR provided soldiers for 12 Company sized rotations to Malaysia, based at RAAF Butterworth, later became RMAF Butterworth. This was later redesignated Non-Warlike Operational service in the 1990s under the Australian Honours and Awards System. 2/4 RAR also provided three soldiers (2 officers and 1 NCO) to the Commonwealth Monitoring Force in Rhodesia/Zimbabwe transition in 1979/1980. In 1980, 2/4 RAR became part of what was initially known as the Operational Deployment Force along with 1 RAR, it later became known as the Ready Deployment Force(RDF) and then Ready battalion Group (RBG). As part of this, the ODF was reacted on different occasions to provide contingencies for developments in the SW Pacific. In 1988, the Battalion was issued DPCU, this was the first wholesale issue that would change the look of the ADF, along with other Armies, to wearing camouflage clothing as everyday dress.

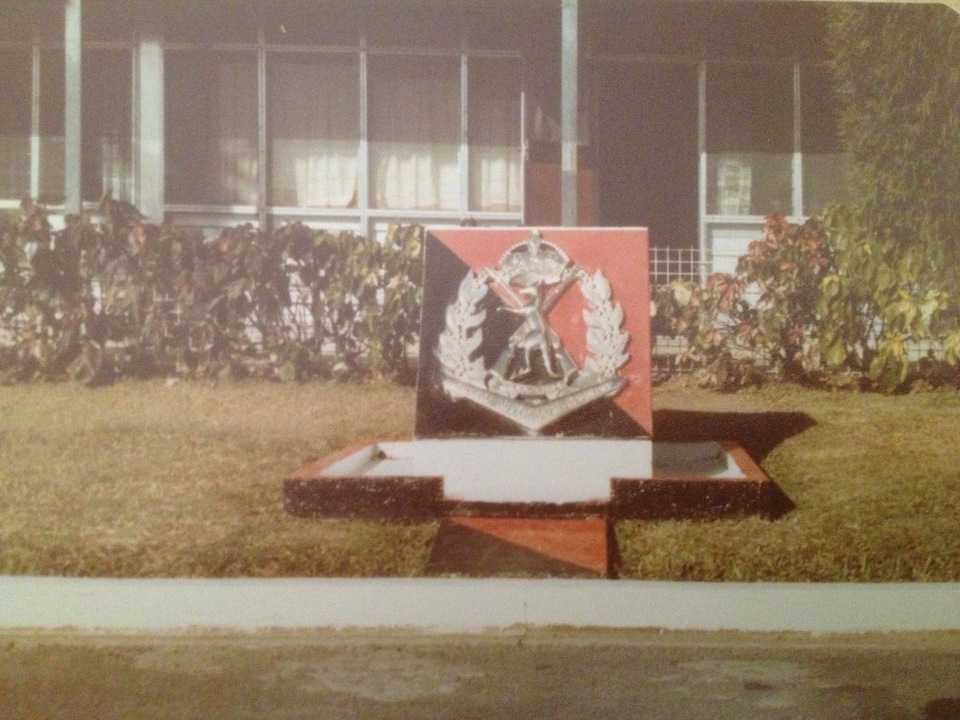
2/4 RAR Guardroom

In 1992 to 1993 the Battalion deployed 29 members of the Battalion to Cambodia as part of the Force Communications Unit (FCU), which was set up to provide the communications capability for UNTAC. In 1993, 2/4 RAR being the online Battalion at the time, also reacted 12 Platoon, Delta Company to provide the security element to the Aviation Task Group sent to Cambodia in support of the UN run Elections. In 1993, 1 RAR was reacted to form the basis of a group (1 RAR Bn Group) to be sent to Somalia, as with both Battalion's at the time they were never at full strength, thus 54 soldiers (Privates) were sent to 1 RAR to fill their gaps for their deployment to OP Solace as the 1 RAR Battalion Group. In 1994 after the failure of UNIMIR, the Australian Government decided that it would support UNIMIR II, providing the medical capability for the new Mission. This meant that A Company, 2/4 RAR was warned for service in Rwanda and 2/4 RARs 'Samichon Lines' became the mounting base for the deployment. A Company deployed to Rwanda in August and just prior to Christmas the decision to unlink 2/4 RAR was made. On 1 February 1995, 2/4 RAR conducted an unlinking parade in Townsville. 2/4 RAR did not provide troops to 4 RAR or split the Battalion, it became 2 RAR wholly. At the same time that the unlinking parade occurred the deployed elements of the Battalion also conducted unlinking parades, with D Company in Malaysia at RMAF Butterworth on Rifle Company Butterworth, A Company in Rwanda on OP Tamar and elements of Support Company supporting an Army Reserve Exercise at Shoalwater Bay.

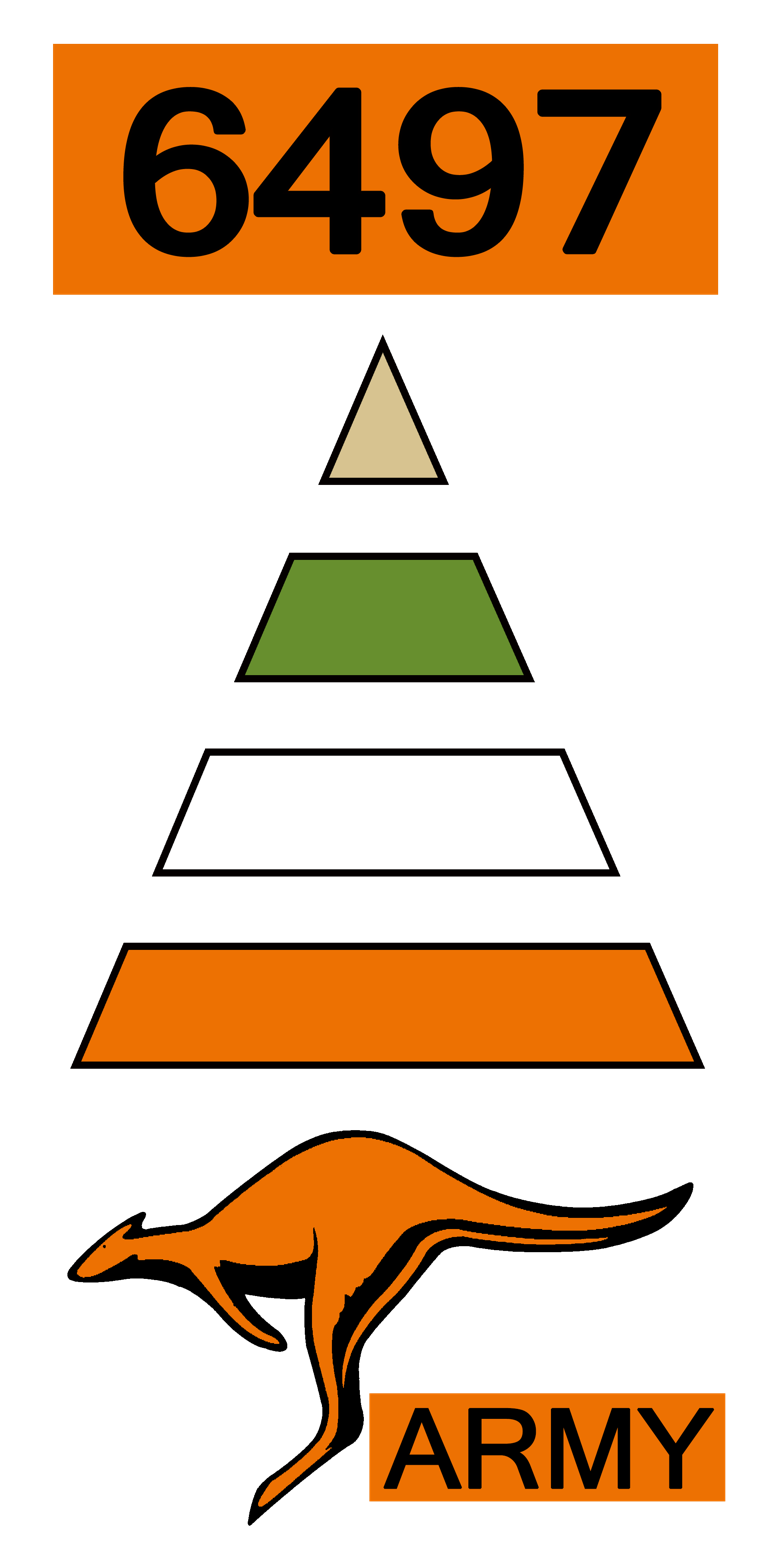
2/4 RAR Battalion Tac-sign

== Alliances ==
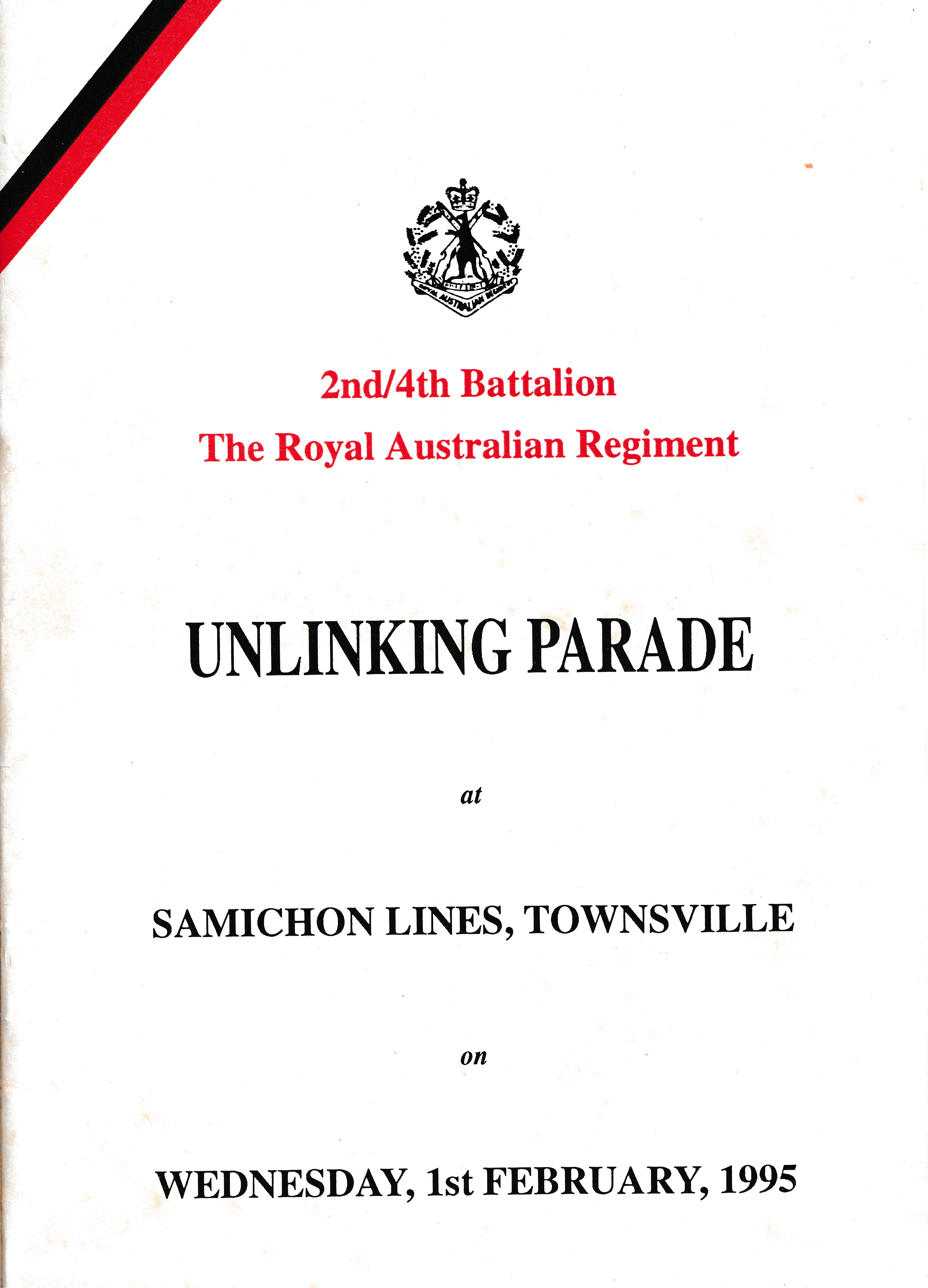
1 February 1995 - Unlinking parade

2/4 RAR maintained the following alliances:

- Coldstream Regiment of Foot Guards
- Irish Regiment of Foot Guards
