= Wade Stothart =

Australian army officer (born 1969)

- Colonel Wade Stothart at Multinational Base Tarin Kowt, Afghanistan, in 2013
- Born: 1969 (age 56–57)
- Military career
- Allegiance: Australia
- Branch: Australian Army
- Service years: 1987–2025
- Rank: Major General
- Commands: Head of Military Personnel (2021–24); Combined Team Uruzgan (2013); ANZAC Battle Group (2008); 3rd Battalion, Royal Australian Regiment (2007–09)
- Conflicts: NATO intervention in Bosnia and Herzegovina; United Nations Transitional Administration in East Timor; Operation Astute; War in Afghanistan; War against the Islamic State
- Awards: Officer of the Order of Australia; Distinguished Service Cross; Conspicuous Service Cross; Commendation for Distinguished Service; Officer of the Legion of Merit (United States); Bronze Star Medal (United States)
- Other work: Director, Office of Australian War Graves (2025–)

Major General Wade Bradley Stothart, AO, DSC, CSC (born 1969) is a retired senior officer of the Australian Army. He joined the army via the Australian Defence Force Academy in 1987 and was commissioned into the Royal Australian Infantry Corps. He has commanded the 3rd Battalion, Royal Australian Regiment (2007–09), ANZAC Battle Group (2008) and Combined Team Uruzgan (2013), and deployed on operations to Bosnia and Herzegovina, Timor-Leste as part of Operations Tanager and Astute, and to Afghanistan and Kuwait. He served as Head People Capability and, later, Head of Military Personnel from December 2021 to December 2024. Following his retirement from the army, he was appointed director of the Office of Australian War Graves in October 2025.

== Military career ==
=== Officer training to Operation Astute ===
Stothart entered the Australian Defence Force Academy (ADFA) as an Australian Army officer cadet in 1987. He graduated with a Bachelor of Arts degree in 1989. Following additional training at the Royal Military College, Duntroon—where he was classmates with fellow future generals Jake Ellwood, Craig Furini and Kathryn Toohey—Stothart was commissioned into the Royal Australian Infantry Corps in December 1990 and posted to the 3rd Battalion, Royal Australian Regiment (3RAR). His early career consisted of a series of regimental and training appointments.

In September 1997, Stothart deployed to Bosnia and Herzegovina on Operation Osier, Australia's contribution to support British operations under the NATO Stabilisation Force. Serving with Multi-National Division (South-West), Stothart was posted to Vitez and made a liaison officer to the 1st Bosnian Corps. His role was, with the aid of a Royal Marines driver and a local interpreter, to liaise with the Bosnian units in his area and with the corps headquarters in Sarajevo. The deployment included moments of tension between Bosnian Croats and the British and Dutch NATO forces with whom Stothart served. In December 1997, for instance, grenades were thrown into a Dutch logistics base in retaliation for the shooting of a Bosnian Croat indicted for war crimes. The incident led to heighten security arrangements in Vitez and a temporary restriction on Stothart's movements between Bosnian units.

Stothart returned to Australia in March 1998 and was subsequently appointed a company commander in the 1st Battalion, Royal Australian Regiment (1RAR). In October 2000, he deployed with the battalion on a six-month rotation under the United Nations Transitional Administration in East Timor, where 1RAR was responsible for providing security to the East Timorese in an area that stretched some 1500 km^{2}. Shortly following his return to Australia in 2001, Stothart was awarded a Master of Arts degree in International Relations from Deakin University. He then completed the Australian Command and Staff College in 2002, graduating with the Governor-General's Prize and a Master of Management from the University of Canberra.

Stothart was appointed Staff Officer Policy to the Chief of the Defence Force in 2006 and assumed command of the 3rd Battalion, Royal Australian Regiment (3RAR) in December 2007. The following year, he deployed with 3RAR for six months as ANZAC Battle Group – Rotation Four on Operation Astute, part of the International Stabilisation Force in Timor-Leste. Stothart handed over command of the battalion in December 2009, was appointed Military Assistant to the Commander Forces Command in 2010 and, following promotion to colonel, was made Director Officer Career Management – Army in 2011. In the 2013 Australia Day Honours, Stothart was appointed a Member of the Order of Australia for his "exceptional service" in Timor-Leste, command of 3RAR, and performance with Forces Command and Career Management.

=== Senior commands: Uruzgan to People Capability ===
Major General Gus McLachlan (centre) oversees the transfer of command of Combined Team Uruzgan from Colonel Simon Stuart (left) to Colonel Wade Stothart (right) at Multinational Base Tarin Kowt on 7 August 2013.

Stothart was deployed to Afghanistan in July 2013 and assumed command of Combined Team Uruzgan from Colonel Simon Stuart at Multinational Base Tarin Kowt on 7 August. Combined Team Uruzgan consisted of personnel from Australia, Singapore and the United States and was tasked with helping further the independence of the Afghan government, people and security forces in Uruzgan Province. During his tour, Stothart oversaw the withdrawal of coalition forces from Uruzgan and, on 3 December, transferred the responsibility of security for the province to the Afghan National Security Forces. Stothart returned to Australia later that month and, for his "distinguished command and leadership" in Afghanistan, was awarded the Distinguished Service Cross in the 2015 Australia Day Honours.

Stothart completed the Defence and Strategic Studies Course in 2014, graduating with the Vice Chief of the Defence Force Prize and a Master of Politics and Policy through Deakin University. The following March, he was promoted brigadier and posted to Army Headquarters as Director General Career Management – Army. Stothart was credited with making "significant contributions to the reform and improvement of career management and Army's people capability through his exceptional leadership, professionalism and dedication" during his two and a half years in the role, for which he was awarded a Conspicuous Service Cross in the 2018 Queen's Birthday Honours.

In December 2017, Stothart deployed to Kuwait as the Director Joint Plans and Assessment (CJ5) in the headquarters of Combined Joint Task Force – Operation Inherent Resolve. He was the senior Australian imbedded in the United States-led headquarters, and oversaw the delivery of strategic and operational plans to deny ISIS a chance of resurgence. He returned to Australia at the end of his twelve-month deployment in December 2018 and was appointed Director General of Army People Capability. For his "distinguished performance of duties" in Kuwait, Stothart was awarded a Commendation for Distinguished Service in the 2020 Australia Day Honours.

In order to better support the transition of personnel from military to civilian life, the Australian government established the Joint Transition Authority in October 2020 with Stothart as its inaugural director general. For fourteen months, he worked closely with the Department of Veterans' Affairs and Commonwealth Superannuation Corporation to improve the systems that support the transitional phase. In December 2021, Stothart was promoted to major general and succeeded Major General Natasha Fox as Head People Capability, with oversight for the recruitment, retention and transition of personnel and the workforce structure of the Australian Defence Force. The position was subsequently reorganised and retitled to Head of Military Personnel in 2023. Stothart relinquished the role in December 2024 and, in recognition of his "distinguished service in leading strategic people capability innovation and reform", was advanced to Officer of the Order of Australia in the 2025 King's Birthday Honours.

== Office of Australian War Graves ==
Stothart was appointed director of the Office of Australian War Graves (OAWG) in the Department of Veterans' Affairs in October 2025. The OAWG maintains Australian war graves, war cemeteries and memorials to the missing, both in Australia and overseas.

== Personal life ==
Stothart is married to Group Captain Susan Stothart, a senior officer in the Royal Australian Air Force. They have two sons.

Military offices
Preceded by Major General Natasha Fox	Head People Capability; Retitled Head of Military Personnel in 2023; 2021–2024	Succeeded by Rear Admiral Letitia Van Stralen
