= Jake Ellwood =

Australian Army officer (born 1970)

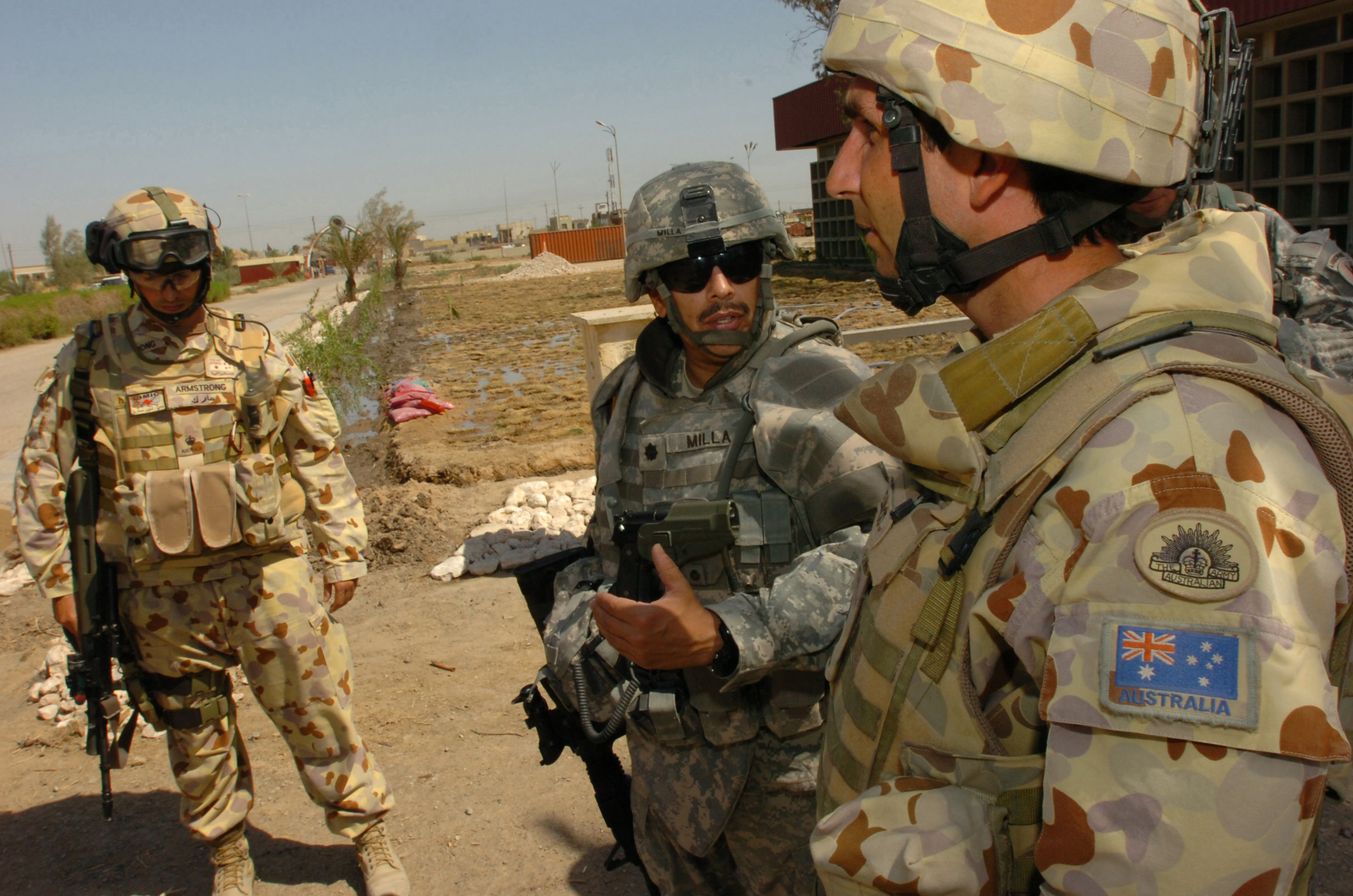
- Lieutenant Colonel Ellwood (right) talking to a United States Army officer in Nasiriyah, Iraq, in September 2007
- Born: 1970 (age 55–56); Melbourne, Victoria
- Military career
- Allegiance: Australia
- Branch: Australian Army
- Service years: 1989–2022
- Rank: Major General
- Unit: Royal Australian Infantry Corps
- Commands: 1st Division (2018–21); Deputy Chief of Army (2018); Combat Training Centre (c. 2010–13); Battle Group Tiger (2008); Overwatch Battle Group (West) (2007); 5th Battalion, Royal Australian Regiment (2006–08)
- Conflicts: Kosovo War; International Force East Timor; Iraq War; Operation Astute; War in Afghanistan
- Awards: Distinguished Service Cross; Member of the Order of Australia; Conspicuous Service Cross; Commendation for Distinguished Service; Officer of the Legion of Merit (United States)

Major General Justin Frederick Ellwood, DSC, AM, CSC (born 1970), commonly known as Jake Ellwood, is a retired senior officer of the Australian Army. He joined the army via the Royal Military College, Duntroon in 1989 and was commissioned into the Royal Australian Infantry Corps. He commanded the 5th Battalion, Royal Australian Regiment (2006–08), Overwatch Battle Group (West) (2007), Battle Group Tiger (2008) and the Combat Training Centre (c. 2010–13), and deployed on operations to Kosovo, East Timor, Iraq and Afghanistan. He served as Deputy Chief of Army from May to December 2018, and commanded the 1st Division from December 2018 to November 2021.

== Early life ==
Ellwood was born in Melbourne, Victoria, in 1970. He was educated at Camberwell Grammar School and St Kevin's College in Toorak, graduating from the latter in 1988. The following year, he entered the Royal Military College, Duntroon as an Australian Army officer cadet, where he was classmates with fellow future generals Craig Furini, Kathryn Toohey and Wade Stothart.

== Military career ==
Ellwood graduated from Duntroon in 1990 and was commissioned into the Royal Australian Infantry Corps. His early career included postings as a platoon commander in the 2nd/4th Battalion, Royal Australian Regiment and as an instructor in field training and tactics at Duntroon, before he was seconded to the British Army from 1998 for a two-year exchange with the Irish Guards, then stationed in Germany. During the secondment he deployed as part of the NATO intervention in the Kosovo War in 1999, serving as second-in-command of an armoured infantry company in the King's Royal Hussars Battle Group. For his service in Kosovo, Ellwood was awarded a Commander British Forces Commendation. He returned to Australia as a company commander and operations officer in the 5th/7th Battalion, Royal Australian Regiment (5/7RAR). Ellwood commanded B Company on operations in East Timor from October 1999 to April 2000, when 5/7RAR deployed with the International Force East Timor.

Ellwood completed the Australian Command and Staff College in 2002 and was appointed brigade major of the 1st Brigade in Darwin, Northern Territory. He was next posted as Director of Reserves – Army at Australian Army Headquarters in Canberra, before assuming command of the newly de-linked 5th Battalion, Royal Australian Regiment (5RAR) on 3 December 2006. In May 2007, under Ellwood's command 5RAR deployed to Iraq as the third rotation of Overwatch Battle Group (West). Based at Tallil Airbase near Nasiriyah, the light armoured battlegroup took part in security, stability and counter-insurgency operations as well reconstruction and rehabilitation efforts in southern Iraq. Ellwood and 5RAR returned to Australia in December 2007, but the following October redeployed as Battle Group Tiger on Operation Astute, part of the International Stabilisation Force in Timor-Leste. Ellwood relinquished command of 5RAR, and the battlegroup, to Lieutenant Colonel Darren Huxley on 31 December 2008. For his service "as a conspicuous commander and an inspirational leader" in command of Overwatch Battle Group (West), Ellwood was awarded the Distinguished Service Cross in the 2009 Australia Day Honours.

Ellwood was posted to the United States in 2009, serving as the Australian Army's liaison officer to the United States Marine Corps in Quantico, Virginia. He returned to Australia to a three-year appointment as commander of the Combat Training Centre. Following completion of the Defence and Strategic Studies Course at the Australian Defence College, Ellwood deployed to Afghanistan from September 2014 as Chief of Joint Operations within Headquarters International Security Assistance Force in Kabul. The role transitioned to Headquarters Operation Resolute Support from January 2015, and Ellwood returned to Australia the following September. In recognition of his "distinguished performance of duties in warlike operations", Ellwood was awarded a Commendation for Distinguished Service and received the Officer of the Legion of Merit from the United States.

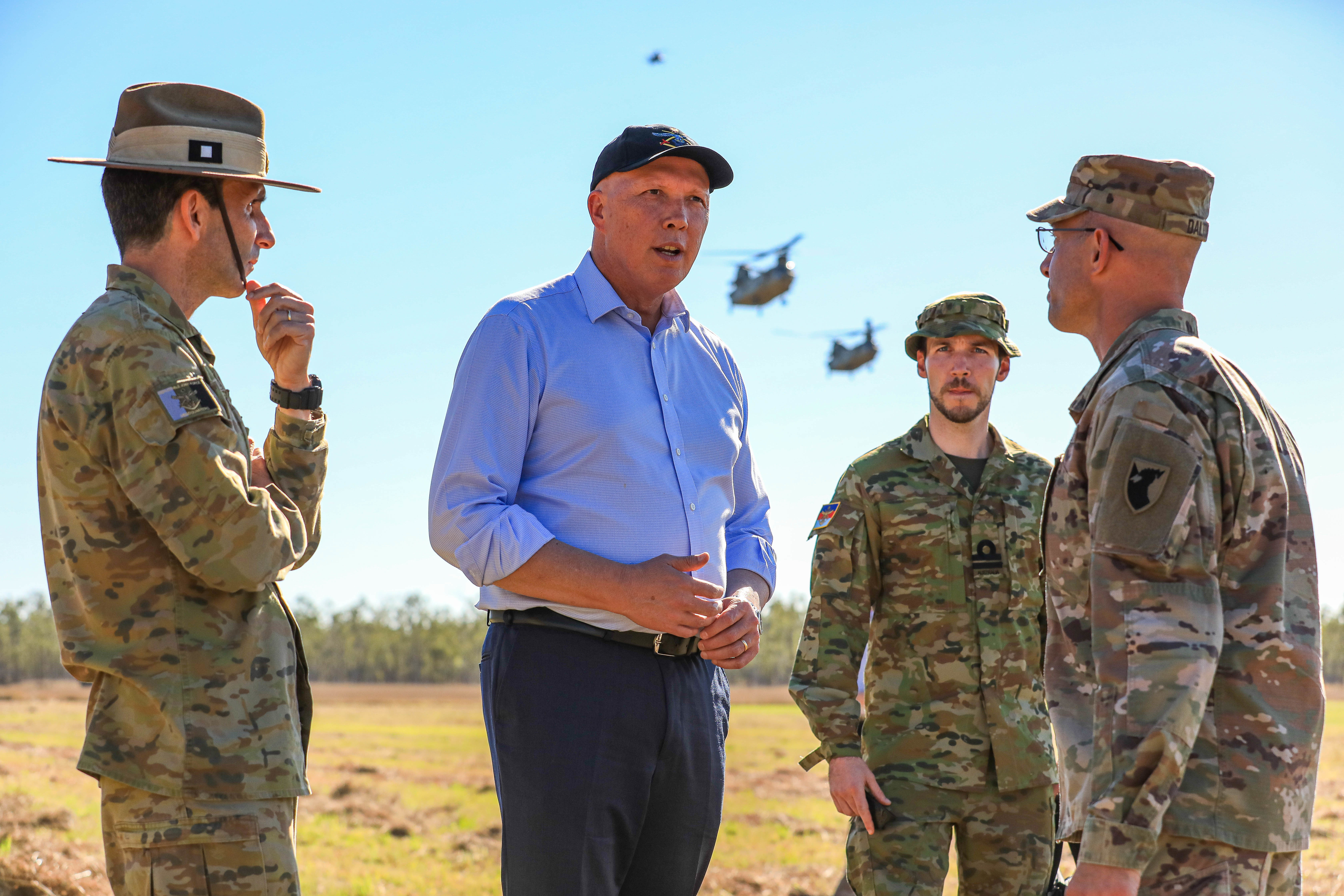
Ellwood briefs defence minister Peter Dutton and US Army Colonel Matthew Dalton during Exercise Talisman Sabre at Camp Growl, Queensland, on 18 July 2021

Ellwood subsequently served as chief of staff Headquarters Forces Command and as Director General of Career Management – Army. Promoted to major general, he was appointed Deputy Chief of Army on 3 May 2018. He occupied the role for only seven months, before succeeding Major General Paul McLachlan in command of the 1st Division on 6 December 2018. Ellwood was appointed a Member of the Order of Australia in the 2019 Queen's Birthday Honours, the award recognising his "remarkable capacity and exceptional leadership and management skills ... across a number of [senior] roles".

Ellwood relinquished command of the 1st Division to Major General Scott Winter in November 2021 and, for his "outstanding achievement" in the command, was awarded the Conspicuous Service Cross in the 2022 Australia Day Honours. The following March, he was appointed State Recovery Coordinator by the Premier of Queensland to lead the large-scale recovery operations in response to the severe floods in South East Queensland. Ellwood retired from the army in December 2022, and the following March was appointed Chief Executive Officer of the Queensland Reconstruction Authority.

Ellwood holds a Bachelor of Arts in Strategic Studies and International Relations and a Master of Arts in Strategic Studies from Deakin University, a Master of Management in Defence Studies from the University of Canberra, and a Graduate Diploma in Education (Secondary) from Monash University.

== Personal life ==
Ellwood is married to Nicole, with whom he has two children. He is patron of the 5RAR Association, and his interests include military history, scuba diving, long-distance running, and fishing.

Military offices
| Preceded by Major General Paul McLachlan | Commander 1st Division; 2018–2021 | Succeeded by Major General Scott Winter |
| Preceded by Major General Rick Burr | Deputy Chief of Army; May–December 2018 | Succeeded by Major General Anthony Rawlins |
