= Stuart Smith (general) =

Australian Army general

Major General Stuart Smith AO DSC
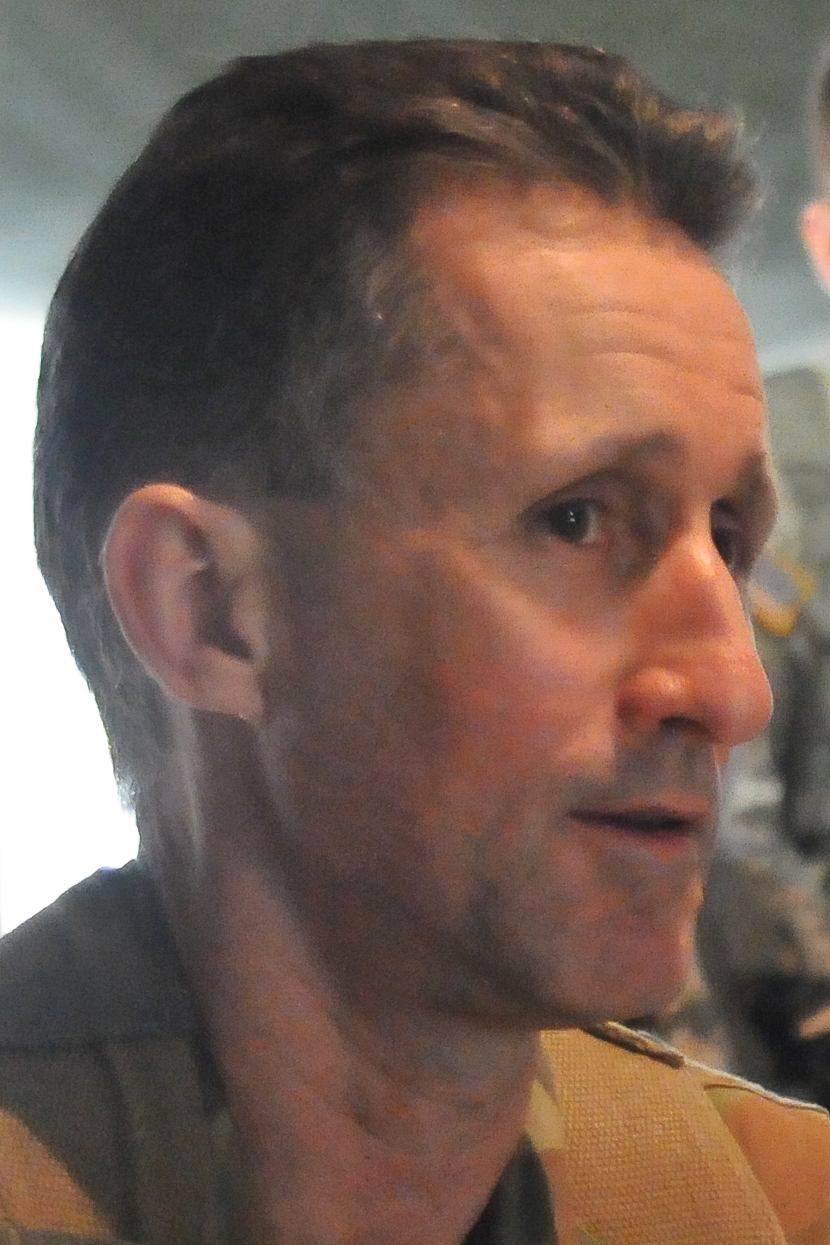
- Major General Stuart Smith in 2013
- Born: 1 November 1963 (age 62); Sydney, New south Wales
- Military career
- Allegiance: Australia
- Branch: Australian Army
- Service years: 1981–2017
- Rank: Major General
- Commands: Deputy Chief of Joint Operations (2015–17); 1st Division (2012–15); Joint Task Force 633 (2012); 3rd Brigade (2009–11); 1st Battalion, Royal Australian Regiment (2002–03)
- Conflicts: East Timor (UNAMET); War in Afghanistan
- Awards: Officer of the Order of Australia; Distinguished Service Cross; Army Commendation Medal (United States)

Major General Stuart Lyle Smith (born 1 November 1963) is a retired senior officer of the Australian Army. He commanded the 1st Division from October 2012 until November 2015, when he was appointed Deputy Chief of Joint Operations.

== Early life ==
Smith was born in Sydney, New South Wales, on 1 November 1963 and educated at St Paul's College in Adelaide. His father, Bernard Lyle Smith, was a soldier in the Australian Army. In March 1969, Bernard, then an infantry sergeant in the 5th Battalion, Royal Australian Regiment, was killed by a mine detonation during his second tour of Vietnam.

== Military career ==
Smith graduated from the Royal Military College, Duntroon, in 1984. He was appointed Commanding Officer of the 1st Battalion, Royal Australian Regiment, in December 2001 and led the battalion on peacekeeping duties in Timor Leste in 2003. For his "exceptional service" on this deployment, Smith was appointed a Member of the Order of Australia in 2005. He commanded the 3rd Brigade in Townsville during the period 2009 to 2011 and coordinated the Australian Defence Force Disaster Response to Tropical Cyclone Yasi in North Queensland in February 2011. In 2012 Smith was appointed Commander Joint Task Force 633, responsible for Operation Slipper and Australian forces operating in the Middle East. He was awarded the Distinguished Service Cross in 2013 in recognition of his "distinguished command and leadership in warlike operations" while in this command.

Following his return from the Middle East, Smith assumed command of the 1st Division in October 2012. He led the division for three years and was advanced to Officer of the Order of Australia, before handing over command to Major General Paul McLachlan in November 2015. Smith was subsequently appointed Deputy Chief of Joint Operations.

Military offices
Preceded by Major General Shane Caughey	Deputy Chief of Joint Operations; 2015–2017	Succeeded by Major General Greg Bilton
Preceded by Major General Rick Burr	Commander 1st Division; 2012–2015	Succeeded by Major General Paul McLachlan
