= Rick Burr =

Australian Army officer

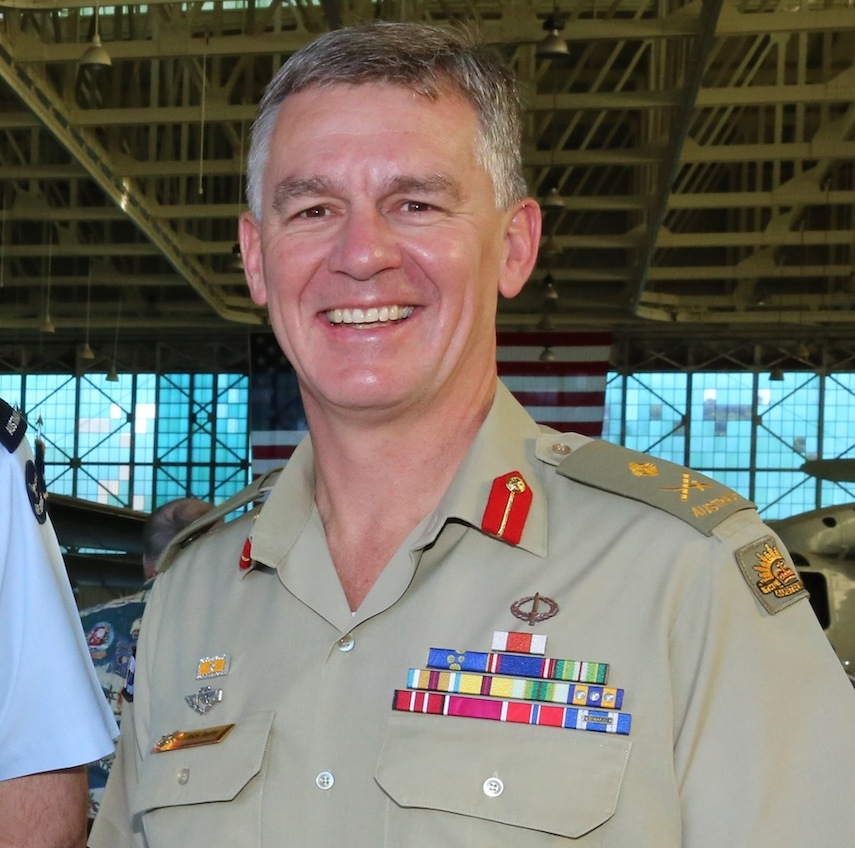
- Major General Burr in 2013
- Born: 2 June 1964 (age 62); Renmark, South Australia
- Military career
- Allegiance: Australia
- Branch: Australian Army
- Service years: 1982–2022
- Rank: Lieutenant General
- Commands: Chief of Army (2018–22); Deputy Chief of Army (2015–18); Deputy Commanding General – Operations (2012–14); 1st Division (2011–12); Military Strategic Commitments (2009–10); Special Air Service Regiment (2003–04)
- Conflicts: Iraq War; War in Afghanistan
- Awards: Officer of the Order of Australia; Distinguished Service Cross; Member of the Royal Victorian Order; Officer of the Legion of Merit (United States); Bronze Star Medal (United States); Order of the Rising Sun, 3rd class, Gold Rays with Neck Ribbon（Japan） Defence Cooperation Medal (Japan); Knight of the Legion of Honour (France); Meritorious Service Medal (Singapore); Army Meritorious Service Star, 1st Class (Indonesia)

Lieutenant General Richard Maxwell "Rick" Burr, AO, DSC, MVO (born 2 June 1964) is a retired senior officer of the Australian Army, who served as Chief of Army from 2 July 2018 to 1 July 2022. He was previously Commander 1st Division from 2011 to 2012, Deputy Commanding General – Operations, United States Army Pacific from January 2013 to November 2014, and Deputy Chief of Army from 2015 to 2018.

== Early life ==
Burr was born in Renmark, South Australia, on 2 June 1964 to Maxwell Henry Burr and Lorelie Ann Morrell. Educated at Renmark High School, where he was a classmate of future cabinet minister Anne Ruston, Burr entered the Royal Military College, Duntroon as an officer cadet in 1982.

== Military career ==
Burr graduated from Duntroon in 1985 with a University of New South Wales accredited Bachelor of Arts, and was commissioned into the Royal Australian Infantry Corps. His first posting came as a platoon commander in the 8th/9th Battalion, Royal Australian Regiment. Burr has spent the majority of his military career with Australian special forces units.

In 2000, Burr (then a lieutenant colonel) served as equerry to Queen Elizabeth II during her royal tour of Australia, during which he was appointed a Member of the Royal Victorian Order.

Burr commanded Australian troops in Afghanistan in 2002, and later during Operation Falconer in 2003 as the Commander of the Special Air Service Regiment (SASR), commonly known as the SAS and considered the most elite unit in the Australian Army. For his leadership in the Middle East, he was awarded the Distinguished Service Cross and the United States Bronze Star Medal. Burr redeployed to Afghanistan in 2008, where he commanded a contingent of special forces. He went on to serve as the Director General Preparedness and Plans and in 2007 he was seconded as a senior adviser to the Department of Prime Minister and Cabinet, where he was the Director General Military Strategic Commitments—for which he was appointed a Member of the Order of Australia in 2011—before assuming command of the 1st Division (2011–12).

On 21 August 2012, United States Army Secretary John M. McHugh announced that Burr would be seconded to the United States Army to become Deputy Commander, United States Army Pacific (USARPAC). He was thus the first foreign general to be given a service component command within the United States Army. Reporting to General Vincent K. Brooks, Burr supervised training within the command and served as USARPAC's liaison with countries in Southeast Asia and Australasia. Having served two years in the role, he handed over to Major General Greg Bilton in November 2014. In recognising his efforts with USARPAC, Brooks said of Burr that "Australia couldn't ask for a better leader, for a better soldier, a better warrior" and awarded him the Legion of Merit.

Burr assumed the post of Deputy Chief of Army in January 2015. He was appointed an Officer of the Order of Australia (AO) in the 2018 Australia Day Honours for "For distinguished service in the implementation of significant reform and the realisation of strategic capabilities within the Australian Defence Force". Promoted to lieutenant general, Burr succeeded Angus Campbell as Chief of Army on 2 July 2018. Burr was awarded the Meritorious Service Medal by the Singaporean Minister for Defence Ng Eng Hen on 8 November 2021. Ng Eng Hen said "As a strong supporter of the SAF’s training in Australia, LTGEN Burr played a key role in the joint development of training areas and advanced training facilities in Australia, and the safe resumption of Ex Wallaby 2021 despite the pandemic."

Burr holds a Master of Military Studies from the Marine Corps University at Marine Corps Base Quantico, Virginia, where he is a Distinguished Graduate of the United States Marine Corps Command and Staff College and graduate of the United States Marine Corps School of Advanced Warfighting. He attended the six-week Harvard Business School Advanced Management Program. Burr is the patron of the Defence Australian Rules Football Association and has a strong commitment to Indigenous Australian service members.

Military offices
Preceded by Lieutenant General Angus Campbell	Chief of Army; 2018–2022	Succeeded by Lieutenant General Simon Stuart
Preceded by Major General Gus Gilmore	Deputy Chief of Army; 2015–2018	Succeeded by Major General Jake Ellwood
New office	Deputy Commanding General – Operations; United States Army Pacific; 2013–2014	Succeeded by Major General Greg Bilton
Preceded by Major General Michael Slater	Commander 1st Division; 2011–2012	Succeeded by Major General Stuart Smith
