= Simon Stuart (general) =

Australian army general

Lieutenant General Simon Stuart AO DSC
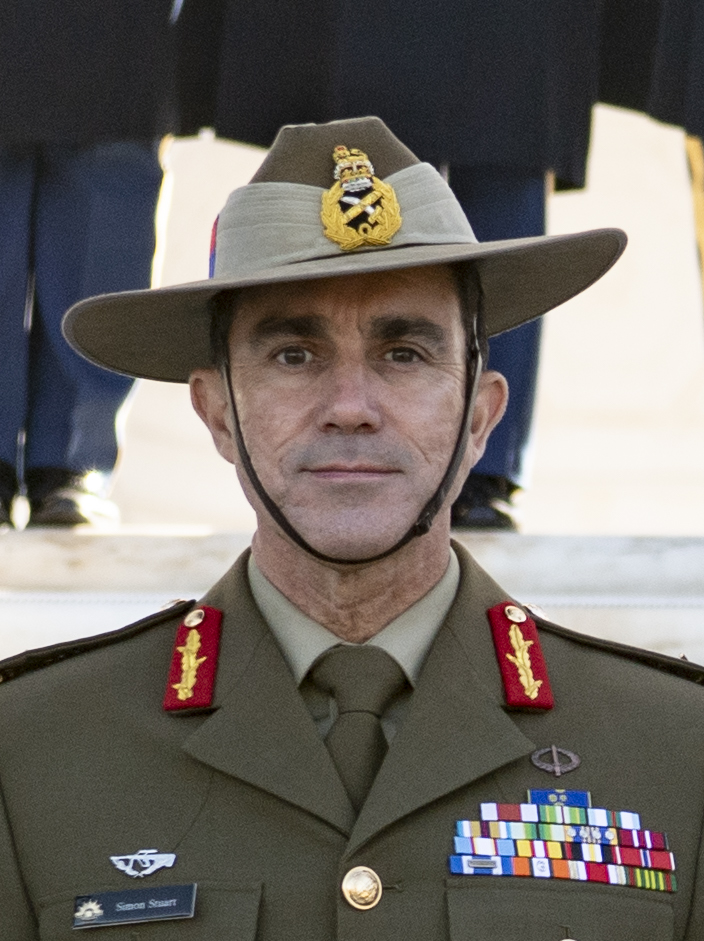
- Lieutenant General Stuart in 2024
- Military career
- Allegiance: Australia
- Branch: Australian Army
- Service years: 1987–2026
- Rank: Lieutenant General
- Commands: Chief of Army (2022–26); Head Land Capability (2020–22); Multinational Force and Observers (2017–19); Combined Team Uruzgan (2012–13); Joint Task Force 631 (2010); 8th/9th Battalion, Royal Australian Regiment (2008–10)
- Conflicts: International Force East Timor; United Nations Transitional Administration in East Timor; Operation Astute; War in Afghanistan; Operation Mazurka
- Awards: Officer of the Order of Australia; Distinguished Service Cross; Medal of Merit (Timor-Leste); Bronze Star Medal (United States); 18 May 1811 Medal (Uruguay); Defence Cooperation Medal (Japan); Army Meritorious Service Star, First Class (Indonesia); Commander of the Legion of Merit (2; United States); Meritorious Service Medal (Singapore)

Lieutenant General Simon Andrew Stuart is a retired senior officer of the Australian Army who served as the Chief of Army from July 2022 to July 2026. He was commissioned into the Royal Australian Infantry Corps from the Royal Military College, Duntroon in 1990. He commanded the 8th/9th Battalion, Royal Australian Regiment (2008–10), Joint Task Force 631 (2010) and Combined Team Uruzgan (2012–13), and deployed to East Timor as part of Operations Warden, Tanager and Astute and to Afghanistan and the Sinai Peninsula. He was Force Commander, Multinational Force and Observers in the Sinai from 2017 to 2019, and Head Land Capability from 2020 to 2022.

== Military career ==
Stuart joined the Australian Army as a recruit in 1987 and initially served as a signalman, before being accepted for officer training. Graduating from the Royal Military College, Duntroon in 1990, he was commissioned an officer in the Royal Australian Infantry Corps and appointed a platoon commander in the 2nd/4th Battalion, Royal Australian Regiment. He deployed as part of the International Force East Timor in 1999, was appointed Officer Commanding B Company, 2nd Battalion, Royal Australian Regiment in 2000 and, from October 2001, led his company on a six-month rotation under the United Nations Transitional Administration in East Timor.

Stuart was sent to the United Kingdom in 2002 to attend the Joint Services Command and Staff College. He graduated the following year with a Master of Arts in defence studies from King's College London. Stuart had previously attained a bachelor's degree from the University of New England and a Master of Project Management from the University of New South Wales. Returning to Australia, he subsequently served as Deputy Director of the Joint Amphibious Capability Implementation Team in Royal Australian Navy Headquarters and was later appointed program manager of the Enhanced Land Force Programme in the Department of Defence. In 2008, Stuart was made commanding officer of the 8th/9th Battalion, Royal Australian Regiment. He relinquished command of the battalion in 2010 and, promoted to colonel, deployed to Timor-Leste as commander Joint Task Force 631 on Operation Astute from February to October that year. In recognition of his "exceptional service" in this role, Stuart was appointed a Member of the Order of Australia in the 2011 Queen's Birthday Honours and awarded the Timor-Leste Medal of Merit.

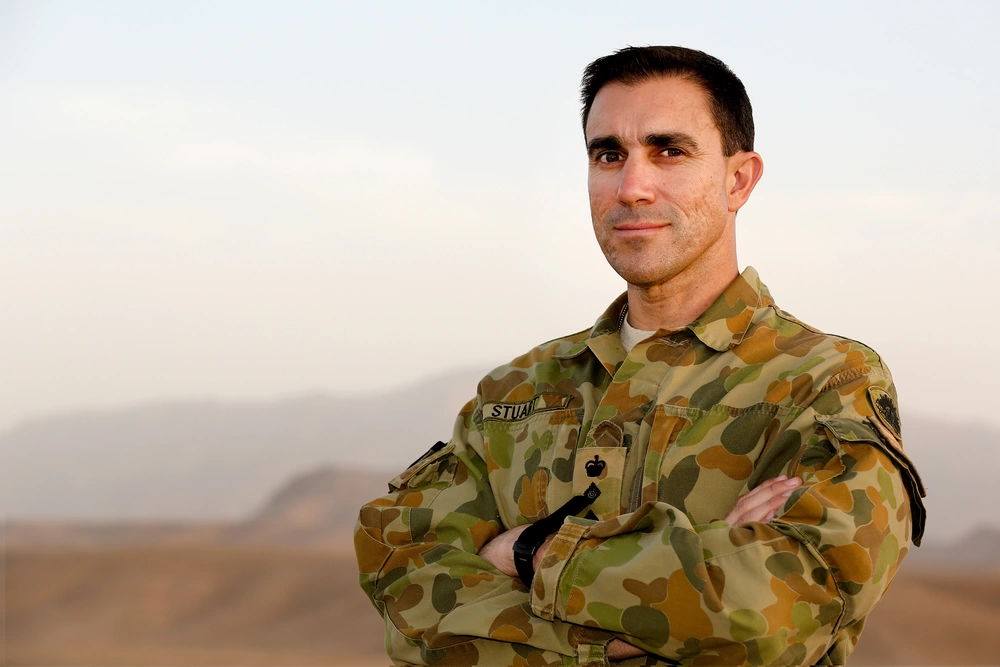
Colonel Simon Stuart in Uruzgan Province, Afghanistan, in 2013

Stuart was made Director Coordination – Army in 2011 and, in October 2012, deployed to Afghanistan as commander Combined Team Uruzgan. The command consisted of personnel from Australia, Singapore and the United States and was tasked with, as Stuart described it, enhancing "the Afghan Government's lead on security, governance and development efforts" in Uruzgan Province. Combined Team Uruzgan, in particular, was to "further the independence" of the Afghan government, people and security forces. Stuart relinquished command to Colonel Wade Stothart in August 2013 and, for his ten months of "distinguished command and leadership" in Afghanistan, was awarded the Distinguished Service Cross in the 2014 Queen's Birthday Honours. He was also awarded the United States Bronze Star Medal.

Major General Gus McLachlan (centre) oversees the transfer of command of Combined Team Uruzgan from Stuart (left) to Colonel Wade Stothart (right) at Multinational Base Tarin Kowt on 7 August 2013.

Stuart was posted to the United States in 2014 as a student at the Army War College. Graduating with a Master of Strategy, he returned to Australia in 2015 as Director General Land Mobility Systems Branch. In December 2016, the Director General of the Multinational Force and Observers (MFO), David M. Satterfield, announced that Stuart had been selected as the peacekeeping force's next Force Commander. Based in the Sinai Peninsula, the MFO had been established in 1981 to supervise the terms of the peace agreement between Egypt and Israel. Stuart assumed command of the MFO from Major General Denis Thompson of Canada on 1 March 2017. He was the second Australian, after Major General David Ferguson, to serve as Force Commander of the MFO. In the role, Stuart was responsible for more than 1,000 personnel from thirteen countries working to support ongoing security cooperation and resolve disagreements along the Sinai border.

After more than two and a half years with the MFO, Stuart relinquished command to Major General Evan Williams of New Zealand on 1 December 2019. In recognition of his service in the Sinai, Stuart was presented with the MFO's Distinguished Service for Peace Award "for his achievements in reorganizing the MFO's structure and processes in Sinai, strengthening its crucial relationships with the Treaty Parties, and increasing consultation with regional UN organizations." Stuart was also awarded the 18 May 1811 Medal from Uruguay, the General Yamazaki Chief of Staff Commendation Award from Japan for his contribution to the first deployment of Japan Self-Defense Forces personnel to the MFO and, in the 2020 Queen's Birthday Honours, he was advanced to Officer of the Order of Australia. The citation for the latter praised Stuart's "distinguished service and exceptional leadership" during his tenure as Force Commander.

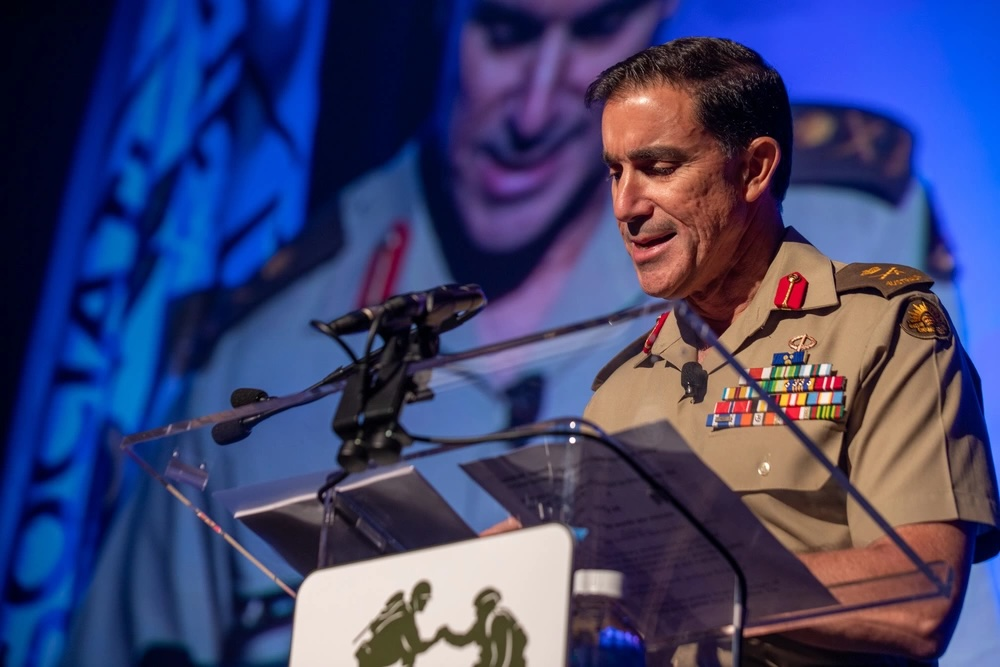
Speaking in Hawaii, 2024

Following his return to Australia, Stuart assumed the role of Head Land Capability in January 2020. In June 2022, the Deputy Prime Minister and Minister for Defence, Richard Marles, announced that Stuart would be appointed as the next Chief of Army. The change of command ceremony took place on 1 July and Stuart officially succeeded Lieutenant General Rick Burr as Chief of Army the following day. In October 2023, he was awarded the Army Meritorious Service Star, First Class by General Agus Subiyanto, Chief of Staff of the Indonesian Army. On 11 March 2024, he was made a Commander of the Legion of Merit by General Randy George for "excellence in military service". In June, Stuart was presented with the Singaporean Meritorious Service Medal (Military) by Singapore's Minister for Defence, Ng Eng Hen.

In September 2024, Stuart released "Australian Army Contribution to the National Defence Strategy 2024", indicating that army had moved from being a balanced force, to a force focused on operating in littoral zones to Australia's via land, sea and air; and using long-range fires. In May 2026, Stuart was made a Commander of the Legion of Merit a second time, by General Ronald P. Clark, commander United States Army Pacific for his "exceptional dedication to advancing the Strategic Landpower Network and deepening the interoperability and shared interests of the U.S. and Australian armies."

== Personal life ==
Stuart is married to Katy, with whom he has two children. He is a patron of the Army Drone Racing Team.

Military offices
Preceded by Lieutenant General Rick Burr	Chief of Army; 2022–2026	Succeeded by Lieutenant General Susan Coyle
Preceded by Major General Kathryn Toohey	Head Land Capability; 2020–2022	Succeeded by Major General Jeremy King
Preceded by Major General Denis Thompson	Force Commander, Multinational Force and Observers; 2017–2019	Succeeded by Major General Evan Williams
