= Gary McKay =

Gary John McKay MC (born 1947) is a writer and former Australian Army officer. He was awarded the Military Cross while serving with the 4th Battalion, Royal Australian Regiment during the Vietnam War. He later served as Commanding Officer of 8th/9th Battalion, Royal Australian Regiment between 1988 and 1990.

McKay wrote his first book—In Good Company—in 1983. The book is an autobiographical account of his service in Vietnam. Other books written by McKay include Delta Four: Australian Riflemen in Vietnam and Tracy, about the impact of Cyclone Tracy on Darwin in 1974. He also co-authored Jungle Tracks: Australian Armor in Viet Nam with Graeme Nicholas.
