= Office of Australian War Graves =

The Office of Australian War Graves (OAWG) is a branch within the Australian Government Department of Veterans' Affairs. The branch was initially a stand-alone agency, formed 1 January 1975. In 1980, the War Graves Act 1980 (Cth) formalised the position of Director War Graves within the Department of Veterans' Affairs. The OAWG acts as Australian agent for the Commonwealth War Graves Commission.

== Responsibilities ==
The responsibilities of the OAWG generally fall within the following five areas.

- Processing of new official commemorations
- Maintenance of war cemeteries, plots, individual graves, post-war commemorations and battle exploit memorials
- Management of major projects at overseas locations
- Provision of research services for commemorative information, and
- Issuing permission to use the relevant Service badge.

The OAWG is also responsible for the maintenance of some 20,000 graves of Commonwealth war dead in 76 war cemeteries & plots and in numerous civil cemeteries, as well as Memorials to the Missing listing over 3,000 names throughout Australia, Norfolk Island, Papua New Guinea and the Solomon Islands.

== Directors of War Graves ==
Name	Period	Ref.
K. F. Macdonald	1978 – 3 May 1981	
Hon. Lance Barnard AO	22 June 1981 – 9 April 1984	
Peter Young	9 April 1984 – 1 October 1985	
Alf Clarke AM	1 October 1985 – 19 June 1991	
Air Vice Marshal Alan Heggen AO	19 June 1991 – 3 October 1997	
Air Vice Marshal Gary Beck AO	3 October 1997 – August 2005	
Major General Paul Stevens AO	2005–2010	
Brigadier Chris Appleton CSC	December 2010 – November 2015	
Ken Corke	December 2015 – 10 January 2019	
Brigadier Paul Nothard AM CSC CSM	11 January 2019 – October 2022	
Brigadier Timothy Bayliss AM	11 October 2022 – October 2025	
Major General Wade Stothart AO DSC CSC	11 October 2025 – present	

== See also ==
- Australian War Memorial
- List of Imperial War Graves staff burials
