= Scott Winter =

Australian army officer

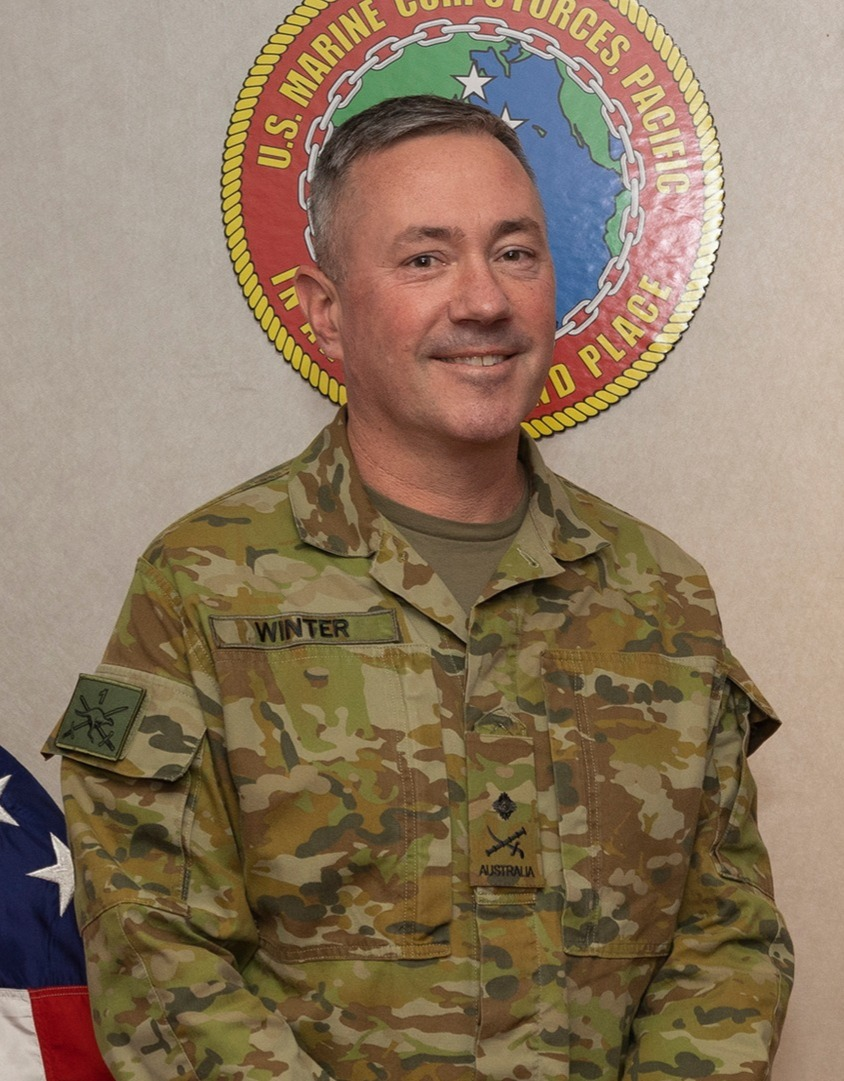
- Scott Winter in 2025
- Alma mater: University of New South Wales (BA (Hons)); Deakin University (MA); King's College London (MA)
- Military career
- Allegiance: Australia
- Branch: Australian Army
- Service years: 1989–present
- Rank: Lieutenant General
- Unit: Royal Australian Armoured Corps
- Commands: Deputy Commander, United Nations Command (2026-); Deputy Commander, United States Army Pacific (2024-25); 1st Division (2021–23); 3rd Brigade (2017–19); 1st Armoured Regiment (2011–14)
- Conflicts: International Force East Timor; Iraq War; War in Afghanistan
- Awards: Member of the Order of Australia; Officer of the Legion of Merit (United States); Bronze Star Medal (United States); Meritorious Service Medal (United States)

Lieutenant General Scott Alexander Winter, AM is a senior officer in the Australian Army. He initially joined the Australian Army Reserve but, following training at the Australian Defence Force Academy and Royal Military College, Duntroon, was commissioned into the Royal Australian Armoured Corps. He has commanded the 1st Armoured Regiment (2011–14) and 3rd Brigade (2017–19), and has deployed on operations to East Timor, Iraq and Afghanistan. He served as commander of the 1st Division from 2021 to 2023, Deputy Commanding General – Strategy and Plans at United States Army Pacific from 2024 to 2026, and since January 2026 has been Deputy Commander, United Nations Command.

== Military career ==
Winter began his military career after entering the Australian Defence Force Academy, later completing his officer training at the Royal Military College, Duntroon. He was commissioned into the Royal Australian Armoured Corps. Early in his career he served in a variety of regimental and staff roles, including appointments with the 1st Armoured Regiment and Headquarters 1st Division.

From 1999 to 2000, Winter was deployed to East Timor, serving as a J3 Watchkeeper during the early stabilisation phase of the mission. He later deployed to Iraq (2003–2004), where he worked as a planner at Headquarters, United States V Corps — contributing to multinational planning efforts. Between 2006 and 2007 he served as a liaison officer from Australia’s Joint Operations Command to the Netherlands Ministry of Defence.

Winter was appointed a Member of the Order of Australia (AM) in the 2015 Australia Day Honours for "exceptional service through contributions to career management as the Senior Officer Manager – Army and to the development and modernisation of the Australian Army as the Commanding Officer 1st Armoured Regiment."

In 2016, Winter deployed to Afghanistan as Chief of Future Operations (CJ5) in the NATO-led Resolute Support Mission, where he was responsible for long-term operational planning and campaign design. In 2017, Winter assumed command of the 3rd Brigade in Townsville, leading the brigade through intensive joint exercises, readiness cycles, and contingency operations. During the 2019 North Queensland floods, Winter assumed command of a Joint Task Force, coordinating Defence support to civil authorities and helping to drive major recovery efforts.

In November 2021, he became Commander of the 1st Division, the Army’s deployable warfighting formation. In this role, he oversaw the division’s involvement in major Indo-Pacific exercises — including Yama Sakura, Freedom Shield, Super Garuda Shield, and Talisman Sabre.

In January 2024, Winter was seconded to the United States Army Pacific (USARPAC) as Deputy Commanding General – Strategy & Plans, based in Hawai‘i. In February 2025, he visited Cambodia to engage with military leadership on strategic cooperation.

Winter was promoted to lieutenant general and appointed Deputy Commander, United Nations Command in January 2026. This selection was welcomed by the United Nations Command itself as a continuation of Australia’s strategic partnership.

== Education ==
Winter holds a Bachelor of Arts (Honours) from the University of New South Wales, a Master of International Relations from Deakin University, and a Master of Defence and Strategic Studies from King’s College London. He is also a graduate of the UK Advanced Command and Staff Course, where he won the Thales Prize, and has completed senior U.S. defence courses including the CJFLCC Course, the U.S. DoD Pinnacle Course, and a senior executive program at the Asia-Pacific Center for Security Studies. He also completed language training at the ADF School of Languages, gaining proficiency in both French and Dutch.

Military offices
Preceded by Lieutenant General Derek A. Macaulay	Deputy Commander, United Nations Command; 2026–present	Incumbent
Preceded by Major General Chris Smith	Deputy Commander United States Army Pacific; 2024–2025	Succeeded by Major General Giles Cornelia
Preceded by Major General Jake Ellwood	Commander 1st Division; 2021–2023	Succeeded by Major General Ash Collingburn
