= Paul McLachlan =

Australian Army officer

- Spouse: Anita
- Military career
- Allegiance: Australia
- Branch: Australian Army
- Service years: 1982–2019
- Rank: Major General
- Unit: Royal Australian Artillery
- Commands: 1st Division (2015–18); Operation Queensland Flood Assist (2011); 7th Brigade (2010–2012); 8th/12th Medium Regiment (2003–2004)
- Conflicts: Iraq War
- Awards: Officer of the Order of Australia; Conspicuous Service Cross

Major General Paul David McLachlan, AO, CSC is a retired senior Australian Army officer. He commanded the 1st Division from November 2015 to December 2018.

== Military career ==
McLachlan joined in the Australian Army in 1982 and graduated from the Royal Military College, Duntroon in 1985. He served with 1st Field Regiment and 8th/12th Medium Regiment of the Royal Australian Artillery. After a range of staff appointments, McLachlan returned to 8th/12th Medium Regiment as its commander in 2003–2004, then moved to J3 (Operations Officer) in Headquarters 1st Division/Deployable Joint Force Headquarters. He served as J3 in Joint Task Force 633 in Baghdad from February 2006, then as Chief of Staff in Headquarters 1st Division. He commanded the 7th Brigade from February 2010. From January 2013, McLachlan became Head of Land Systems in the Defence Materiel Organisation.

== Honours and awards ==
- 2012 Australia Day Honours: Conspicuous Service Cross for outstanding achievement as the Commander Joint Task Force 637 on Operation Queensland Flood Assist in January and February 2011.
- 2013 Australia Day Honours: Member of the Order of Australia (AM) in the Military Division for exceptional service to the Australian Defence Force as the Director General Development and Plans-Army, and as the Commander of the 7th Brigade.
- 2018 Queen's Birthday Honours: Officer of the Order of Australia (AO) in the Military Division for distinguished service in the appointments of Head Land Systems Division, Commander of the 1st Division and significant contributions to Army strategic command and control capabilities within the Australian Defence Force.

== Personal life ==
McLachlan is married to Anita, and has two children.

Military offices
Preceded by Major General Stuart Smith	Commander 1st Division; 2015–2018	Succeeded by Major General Jake Ellwood
