= Thomas Dodds =

Australian general (1873–1943)

Thomas Henry Dodds
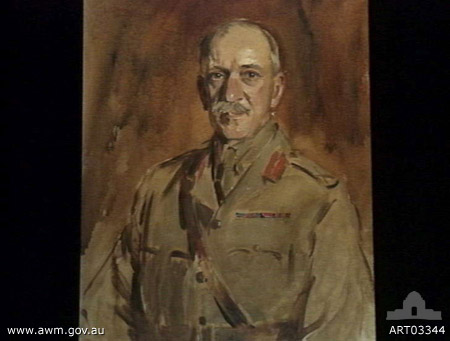
- Portrait of Brigadier General Thomas Dodds
- Born: 11 November 1873; Gateshead, England
- Died: 15 October 1943 (aged 69); Victoria, Australia
- Military career
- Allegiance: Australia
- Branch: Australian Army
- Service years: 1892–1934
- Rank: Major General
- Commands: 1st Division (1927–29); Air Headquarters London (1918)
- Conflicts: Second Boer War; First World War
- Awards: Companion of the Order of St Michael and St George; Commander of the Royal Victorian Order; Distinguished Service Order; Mentioned in Despatches (3)

Major General Thomas Henry Dodds, CMG, CVO, DSO (11 November 1873 – 15 October 1943) was an Australian Army colonel in the First World War. He was promoted major general in 1930 and retired in 1934.

== Early life and career ==
Thomas Henry Dodds was born on 11 November 1873 at Gateshead, England. Dodds and his family migrated to Australia in 1883. Dodds was educated at Fortitude Valley State School and Brisbane Normal School and became a teacher with the Queensland Department of Public Instruction in 1888.

Dodds enlisted in the militia in 1892 and was commissioned as a second lieutenant in the Queensland Volunteers on 2 August 1899. He was promoted to lieutenant on 1 December 1899. In 1901 Dodds joined the 5th (Queensland Imperial Bushmen) Contingent as adjutant and went to South Africa. There he saw service in the Transvaal, the Orange River Colony and the Cape Colony. When the bushmen and other units were attacked by a superior Boer force at Onverwacht, Dodds rallied the survivors and held on to a ridge until help arrived. For this and other actions he was mentioned in despatches and awarded the Distinguished Service Order (DSO). He returned to Australia in May 1902 with the rank of honorary captain.

Dodds was promoted to captain on 27 July 1904 but on 1 July 1906, he joined the regulars as lieutenant, serving on the staff of the 1st Military District (Queensland). On 1 January 1911 he moved to Melbourne to serve at Army Headquarters. Dodd was secretary of the Railway Council from 14 February 1911 to 31 December 1912, Director of Personnel from 1 July 1911 and Assistant Adjutant General from 16 March 1913. He was also secretary of the establishments committee from 1 April 1913 to 31 May 1914. Along the way he was promoted to captain in 1911 and major in 1913.

From 15 August 1914 to 15 September 1916, Dodds was Adjutant General and a member of the Military Board, replacing Lieutenant Colonel V. Sellheim who was appointed to the Australian Imperial Force. Dodds was promoted to lieutenant colonel on 1 December 1915 but his ability kept him in Australia, where he was responsible for the training, recruitment and organisation of new units of the AIF. A request from Major General Legge in May 1915 for Dodds to be sent as assistant adjutant and quartermaster general of the 2nd Division was turned down.

== First World War ==
On 3 April 1917, Dodds was appointed to the AIF as a full colonel. He arrived in England on 17 May 1917, to become Deputy Adjutant General of the AIF. By this time there was over 120,000 Australian soldiers in France and the job was a formidable one. On 1 October 1918, Dodds became Commandant of the AIF Administrative Headquarters in London. For his services he was twice mentioned in despatches and appointed a Companion of the Order of St Michael and St George (CMG) in the 1918 King's Birthday Honours.

== Later career ==
Dodds returned to Australia in May 1919 and resumed his duties at Army Headquarters as a colonel. He was deputy director of the royal visit of the Prince of Wales in 1920, for which he was appointed a Commander of the Royal Victorian Order (CVO). He was military secretary at Army Headquarters from 1920 to 1922 and Adjutant General from 1922 to 1924. In January 1925, the Chief of the General Staff, Lieutenant General Sir Harry Chauvel sent him to London as Australian Representative at the War Office. On his return in 1927, he became Commandant of the 2nd Military District (New South Wales) and commander of the 1st Division. In 1929 Dodds once again became Adjutant General, with the task of dismantling the Universal Service Scheme that he had once built and creating a new volunteer militia. Dodds was promoted to major general in 1930 and retired in 1934, by which time the volunteer army was a reality.

Dodds held the post of honorary Federal Treasurer of the Returned and Services League from 1931 to 1941. He was elected to the Hawthorn City Council in 1935. On 15 October 1943, Dodds died of a sudden heart attack. He was accorded full military honours at his funeral. Dodds was a member of Victorian Naval and Military Lodge No 49 which held its meetings at 25 Collins street, Melbourne.
