= 8th/9th Battalion, Royal Australian Regiment =

Australian Army unit

- Active: 31 October 1973– 30 June 1997; 31 October 2007– present
- Country: Australia
- Branch: Army
- Type: Infantry
- Role: Motorised infantry
- Part of: 7th Brigade
- Garrison/HQ: Uruzgan Lines, Enoggera Barracks, Brisbane, Queensland
- Motto: Duty First
- March: The Brown and Grey Lanyard (Black Bear)
- Mascots: Merino Ram named John MacArthur VIII (Stan the Ram)
- Engagements: East Timor; War in Afghanistan; Iraq
- Decorations: Republic of Vietnam Cross of Gallantry with Palm Unit Citation

Commanders
- Current commander: LTCOL J Eccleston
- Notable commanders: Peter Leahy, Gary McKay, MC

Insignia
- Unit colour patch

The 8th/9th Battalion, Royal Australian Regiment (8/9 RAR) is a motorised infantry battalion of the Australian Army. It was originally formed in 1973 by linking together both the 8th and 9th Battalions of the Royal Australian Regiment. Over the next twenty-four years the battalion would remain on the Australian Order of Battle based at Enoggera Barracks in Brisbane, Queensland, until it was disbanded in 1997 amid a number of Defence-wide cutbacks introduced by the Howard government. In 2006 it was announced that the battalion would be re-raised as part of a plan to expand the size of the Army and since then it established itself as a fully deployable motorised infantry battalion as part of 7th Brigade.

== History ==
8/9 RAR was formed on 31 October 1973 by linking 8th Battalion, Royal Australian Regiment and 9th Battalion, Royal Australian Regiment as part of cutbacks to the army following the end of the Vietnam War. Upon formation the unit was based at Enoggera Barracks in Brisbane where it formed part of the 6th Brigade. The battalion's first major task came in the wake of the 1974 Brisbane flood, when it assisted with the subsequent disaster relief and cleanup efforts.

During the 1980s the battalion lost a large number of its personnel to the 1st and 2nd Battalions, Royal Australian Regiment as part of the Operational Deployment Force, but nevertheless undertook the task of maintaining the Army's amphibious and urban operations specialisations. In 1990, it took on a further role of training Papua New Guinea Defence Force personnel.

In January 1992, the battalion took on the role of a Ready Reserve unit. Under this scheme Ready Reserve soldiers were posted to the battalion for an initial 12-month full-time period, followed by a further period of four years part-time. On 10 October 1992, the battalion received the Right to the Freedom of Entry to the City of Brisbane. In 1996, the Ready Reserve scheme was abolished by the incoming Howard government, and shortly after this, as part of a restructuring of the Army, 8/9 RAR was disbanded on 30 June 1997.

On 24 August 2006, Prime Minister John Howard announced the Enhanced Land Force plan that the battalion would be re-raised under a new plan to increase the size of the Army. The battalion would continue to be called the 8/9th Battalion and would be based in South East Queensland. On 2 October 2007, the Prime Minister announced that 8/9 RAR would be operationally deployable by 2010, be based in Brisbane at Enoggera Barracks and would be equipped with Bushmaster Protected Mobility Vehicles.

The battalion was officially re-raised on 31 October 2007 and was rapidly established as a motorised unit. Although originally it was intended that the battalion would consist of two motorised rifle companies, a support company and an administration company, this structure was deemed unworkable and the battalion was subsequently reorganised. By mid-2009, the battalion consisted of 620 personnel organised into one motorised rifle company, one light infantry company, a manoeuvre support company and a combat service support company. Meanwhile, 7th Brigade was transformed into a regular motorised formation, following the transfer of its reserve infantry battalions to 11th Brigade. By 2010, 8/9 RAR was established as a motorised infantry battalion, and with 6 RAR and 2/14 Light Horse (QMI) is one of three deployable Battle Groups in the brigade.

=== East Timor ===
In late-February 2010, 130 soldiers from the battalion's 'A' Company took over responsibility of the Timor Leste Task Group, replacing 2 RAR in East Timor. This force was rotated back to Australia in June 2010 after a four-month deployment, and was replaced by 'B' Company, 8/9RAR.

=== Afghanistan ===
Between January 2012 and June 2012, 8/9 RAR deployed to Uruzgan Province, Afghanistan as the core of MTF-4.

=== Iraq ===
In 2015–16, members of 8/9 RAR deployed on two consecutive rotations of Operation Okra in Iraq and Operation Highroad in Afghanistan.

=== Minor operations and individual deployments ===
The battalion has also contributed small numbers of personnel to Operations Slipper, Anode, and Pakistan Assist, and was heavily involved in search and rescue efforts during the 2010–11 Queensland floods, deploying to its emergency support force on short notice to Grantham in the Lockyer Valley. By mid-2011, 8/9 RAR had grown to comprise a battalion headquarters, three rifle companies and an operational support company.

== Traditions ==
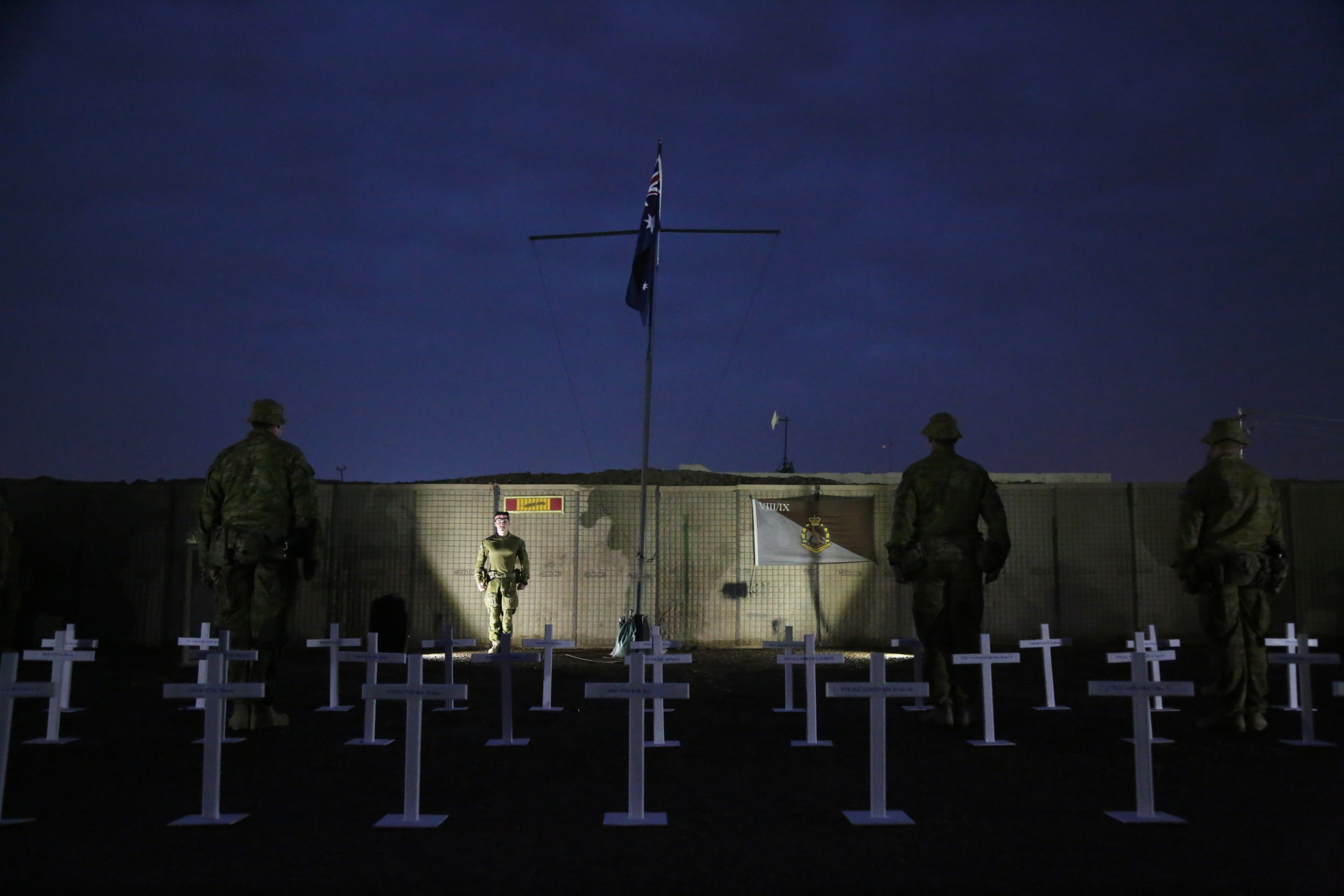
Soldiers from 8/9 RAR deployed to Iraq in 2016 commemorate 8 RAR's role in the battles of the Long Hai Hills during the Vietnam War

The battalion lanyard is coloured slate grey and beech brown and these colours are used elsewhere in sporting uniforms and the like. The official battalion march is The Brown and Grey Lanyard, but the unofficial march is Black Bear with a boisterous 'HOI' inserted in the appropriate places.

The 8/9 RAR mascot is a stud merino ram officially named John Macarthur (currently John Macarthur VIII), after the Australian wool pioneer, but known affectionately to the diggers as 'Stan the Ram'. Elizabeth 'Lizzie' Macarthur arrived in the Battalion in 2020 as Stan's companion.

== Current role & composition ==
In 2017 the battalion commenced the transition to the motorised role with the adoption of the Bushmaster protected mobility vehicle.

The battalion currently consists of:

- Battalion Headquarters
- Three 3 Rifle Companies – Alpha, Bravo and Charlie
- Support Company, comprising Mortar, Direct Fire Support Weapons, Reconnaissance, Sniper, Signals and Pipes and Drums Platoons
- Combat Service Support Company

== Commanding Officers ==
The following table lists the Commanding Officers of 8/9 RAR. Only those post-nominals held at the time of holding the appointment of CO 8/9 RAR are shown.

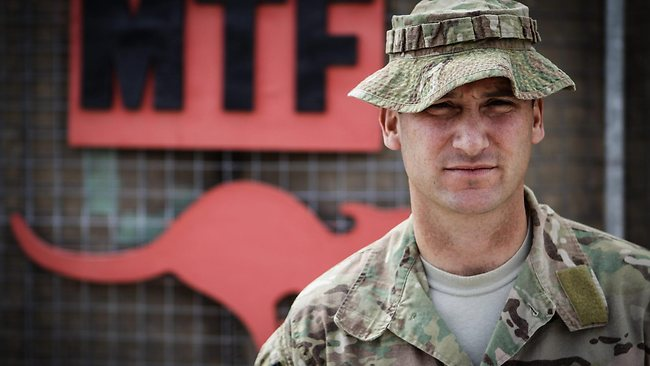
Former Commanding Officer 8/9 RAR LTCOL K.S. Fegan

Dates	Name
31 Oct 1973 – 27 Nov 1974	LTCOL Adrian Clunies-Ross, MBE
28 Nov 1974 – 16 Jan 1977	LTCOL E.A Chitham, MC
17 Jan 1977 – 13 Dec 1978	LTCOL T.H. Holland
14 Dec 1978 – 7 Aug 1980	LTCOL E.F. Pfitzner
8 Aug 1980 – 17 Dec 1982	LTCOL J.R. Brett
18 Dec 1982 – 20 Dec 1984	LTCOL R.E. Thornley
21 Dec 1984 – 9 Dec 1986	LTCOL G.W. Hurford
10 Dec 1986 – 15 Dec 1988	LTCOL M.J. Edwards
16 Dec 1988 – 14 Dec 1990	LTCOL Gary McKay, MC
15 Dec 1990 – 14 Dec 1992	LTCOL Peter Leahy
15 Dec 1992 – 31 Dec 1994	LTCOL D.S.M. Roche
1 Jan 1995 – 31 Dec 1996	LTCOL J.A. Robbs
1 Jan 1997 – 30 Jun 1997	LTCOL J.F. Edwards
31 Oct 2007 – 16 Jan 2011	LTCOL Simon Stuart
17 Jan 2011 – 31 Dec 2013	LTCOL Kahlil Fegan DSC
1 Jan 2014 – 15 Jan 2017	LTCOL J.A. Hammett
16 Jan 2017 – 10 Dec 2018	LTCOL A.R. Bennett, DSM
11 Dec 2018 – 09 Dec 2020	LTCOL S.R. Dickie
10 Dec 2020	LTCOL J. Eccleston

== Regimental Sergeant Majors ==
The following table lists the Regimental Sergeant Majors of 8/9 RAR. Only those post-nominals held at the time of holding the appointment of RSM 8/9 RAR are shown.

Dates	Name
31 Oct 1973 – 13 Sep 1975	WO1 J.S. Allan
14 Sep 1975 – 17 May 1976	WO1 G.J. Sutherland
18 May 1976 – 28 Mar 1979	WO1 P. Cowan
29 Mar 1979 – 13 Apr 1980	WO1 J.P. Henderson
14 Apr 1980 – 18 Dec 1981	WO1 K.S. "Lofty" Wendt (later appointed RSM-A)
19 Dec 1981 – 21 Dec 1983	WO1 W.J. Burns
22 Dec 1983 – 12 Dec 1985	WO1 G. Willman
13 Dec 1985 – 16 Jan 1988	WO1 R. George
17 Jan 1988 – Jan 1990	WO1 R. Briais
Jan 1990 – 20 Jan 1992	WO1 R. Slater
21 Jan 1992 – 1 Dec 1994	WO1 S.F. Paulson
1 Dec 1994 – 4 Dec 1996	WO1 E.O. Hutchinson
4 Dec 1996 – 30 Jun 1997	WO1 M. Levine
31 Oct 2007 – 17 Jan 2010	WO1 W. Lampard
18 Jan 2010 – 20 Jan 2013	WO1 I.A. D'Arcy, OAM
21 Jan 2013 – 18 Jan 2015	WO1 D.S.S. Trill
19 Jan 2015 – 14 Jan 2018	WO1 M. Retallick, CSM
15 Jan 2018 – 14 Jan 2020	WO1 J.L. Watene, CSM
15 Jan 2020	WO1 M. Carroll, CSM

== 8th/9th Battalion Association ==
The Battalion Association was created to perpetuate the memory of the unit when it was initially disbanded in 1997. With resurrection in 2007, the association now serves as the conduit for past, present and future members.

== Alliances and Relationships ==
- United Kingdom – The Parachute Regiment
- Fiji - Fiji Infantry Regiment, Republic of Fiji Military Forces
