= ANZAC Battle Group =

Australian-led military unit

The ANZAC Battle Group was an Australian-led battle group deployed to Timor Leste as part of Operation Astute. The battle group was established in September 2006 and comprised several rifle companies, including a company from the New Zealand Army, and sub-units of other Australian Army units.

== Rotations ==
As at June 2009 there have been six rotations of the ANZAC Battle Group.

=== First Rotation ===
- Headquarters, 6th Battalion, Royal Australian Regiment
  - B Company, 1st Battalion, Royal Australian Regiment
  - A Company, 6th Battalion, Royal Australian Regiment
  - D Company, 2/1st Battalion, Royal New Zealand Infantry Regiment
  - Battery, 16th Air Defence Regiment, Royal Australian Artillery (operating as infantry)
  - 17 Construction Squadron, Royal Australian Engineers
  - 7 Combat Service Support Battalion
  - Elements, B Squadron, 3rd/4th Cavalry Regiment
  - B Squadron, 5th Aviation Regiment
  - Troop, 1st Aviation Regiment
  - Elements, 7 Command Support Regiment

=== Second Rotation ===
- Headquarters, 1st Battalion, Royal Australian Regiment
  - B Company, 1st Battalion, Royal Australian Regiment
  - C Company, 1st Battalion, Royal Australian Regiment
  - Victor Company, 1st Battalion, Royal New Zealand Infantry Regiment
  - 111 AD Battery, 16th Air Defence Regiment, Royal Australian Artillery
  - Elements, 4th Field Regiment, Royal Australian Artillery
  - Support Company, 1st Battalion, Royal Australian Regiment
  - Administration Company, 1st Battalion, Royal Australian Regiment
  - Elements, 1st Military Police Battalion
  - Elements, 17 Construction Squadron, Royal Australian Engineers
  - Elements, B Squadron, 3rd/4th Cavalry Regiment
  - Elements, B Squadron, 5th Aviation Regiment
  - Troop, 1st Aviation Regiment

=== Third Rotation ===
The Battle Group was renamed Battle Group Samichon for this rotation

- Headquarters, 2nd Battalion, Royal Australian Regiment
  - Three rifle companies from 2nd Battalion, Royal Australian Regiment
  - Bravo Company, 2nd/1st Battalion, Royal New Zealand Infantry Regiment
  - Administration Company, Royal Australian Regiment
  - Mechanised Platoon, 7th Battalion, Royal Australian Regiment
  - Elements, 4th Field Regiment, Royal Australian Artillery
  - Elements, 1st Military Police Battalion
  - Elements, 3rd Combat Engineer Regiment, Royal Australian Engineers
  - Elements, 3rd Combat Service Support Battalion
  - Elements, B Squadron, 5th Aviation Regiment
  - Troop, 1st Aviation Regiment

=== Fifth Rotation ===
The Battle Group was renamed Battle Group Tiger for its rotation.

Elements included, but were not limited to:

- Headquarters, 5th Battalion, Royal Australian Regiment
  - A Company, 5th Battalion, Royal Australian Regiment
  - C Company, 5th Battalion, Royal Australian Regiment (returned home after four months)
  - D Company, 5th Battalion, Royal Australian Regiment
  - A single company from the Royal New Zealand Infantry
  - 110 AD Battery, 16th Air Defence Regiment, Royal Australian Artillery (re-rolled as a G Infantry Company)

=== Sixth Rotation ===
The battle group was known as TLBG-VI was made up of elements from the 2 RAR, 1st Armoured Regiment, 3 CER, as well as a company of 2nd/1st Battalion, Royal New Zealand Infantry Regiment with Queen Alexandra's Mounted Rifles in support.

- Headquarters 2nd Battalion, Royal Australian Regiment
  - A Company, 2nd Battalion, Royal Australian Regiment
  - C Company, 2nd Battalion, Royal Australian Regiment
  - Admin Company, 2nd Battalion, Royal Australian Regiment
  - A single company from the Royal New Zealand Infantry Regiment
