= 5th Battalion, Royal Australian Regiment =

Australian Army infantry unit

- Active: 1965–1973; 2006–2024
- Country: Australia
- Branch: Army
- Type: Motorised infantry
- Part of: 1st Brigade
- Garrison/HQ: Darwin
- Nickname: The Tiger Battalion
- Motto: Duty First (Motto of the Royal Australian Regiment)
- Colors: Gold
- March: "Dominique" (band) "Men of Harlech" – slow
- Mascot: Sumatran tiger "Quintus Rama"
- Engagements: Vietnam War: Battle of Binh Ba; East Timor; Iraq War; War in Afghanistan
- Decorations: Gallantry Cross Unit Citation (South Vietnam)

Insignia
- Unit colour patch

The 5th Battalion, Royal Australian Regiment (5 RAR) was a regular motorised infantry battalion of the Australian Army. Originally established in 1965 it would serve two tours of South Vietnam before it was linked with the 7th Battalion to form the 5th/7th Battalion, Royal Australian Regiment in 1973. In late 2006 the two units were de-linked, and 5 RAR again joined the Australian Army's order of battle in its own right. It has since served in Iraq, East Timor and Afghanistan. The battalion was re-merged with the 7th Battalion to reform the 5th/7th Battalion, Royal Australian Regiment in 2024.

== History ==
=== Formation ===
The 5th Battalion was formed at Holsworthy Barracks, New South Wales on 1 March 1965. According to historian Robert O'Neill, since both 5 RAR and 6 RAR were the first battalions of the Royal Australian Regiment 'to be composed of a mixture of regulars and national servicemen, their formation and development was a particularly vital experiment for this was to be the model for the infantry battalions of the Army from then onwards'.

This was a time of expanding commitments for the Australian Army: an infantry battalion serving on rotation in Malaysia since 1955; a training team deployed to South Vietnam since 1962, followed by the deployment of the 1st Battalion in 1965 and then the 1st Australian Task Force from 1966 to 1972; and a battalion commitment to Borneo from 1964 to 1966. To meet the challenges of these commitments, the Army needed to expand from four to nine battalions. In 1965, the 1st Battalion, organised on the Pentropic establishment (in theory some 1,300 men) was split to provide a cadre of regulars to the new 5th Battalion, whilst conscripts were used to bring the unit up to strength. When the battalion held its inauguration parade on 5 November 1965, some 250 conscripts from the first national service intake were present amongst the ranks. The 2nd and 3rd Battalions were drawn on in a similar fashion to raise the 6th and 7th Battalions, respectively.

Lieutenant Colonel P. H. Oxley was the first Commanding Officer, but when he was promoted colonel in September 1965 command passed to Lieutenant Colonel J. A. Warr. This was a challenging time for the new unit. According to O'Neill: "The First Battalion was in the final stages of its preparations for departure to Vietnam, and so the Fifth came in for more than its usual share of routine chores and administrative duties. In order to foster high spirit in the new battalion, the idea of becoming known as the 'Tiger Battalion' was introduced and this spread rapidly and spontaneously amongst its members. From that time on Fifth Battalion were the Tiger Battalion, from the gold of their lanyards to the tiger tails tied onto the kitbags leaving for Vietnam in April 1966."

=== First tour of Vietnam ===
Early in 1966 the battalion learnt that it was to serve in South Vietnam as one of two infantry battalions in the 1st Australian Task Force (1 ATF). As it was given only three months notice for its deployment, the training schedule prior to embarkation was hectic. 'Range practices began in the dawn hours and often went until 2200 hours. Nights and weekends were spent training in night movement and conducting lectures on Vietnamese customs, history, culture and language'. Each company trained at Gospers, in the Wiangaree State Forest in New South Wales, as well as at Canungra, Queensland. In March 1966 the battalion emplaned at Aero Paddock at Holsworthy and moved to Gospers for its final exercise, which included advances to contact, night movement, and defensive operations. After this C Company would deploy to South Vietnam on HMAS Sydney, whilst the remainder of the battalion flew by air.

Upon arrival in South Vietnam the battalion, under Warr's command, commenced operations on 24 May 1966 by participating in the clearance of the 1 ATF base at Nui Dat in Operation Hardihood. For this operation the battalion was under the command of the US 173rd Airborne Brigade and worked alongside two American parachute battalions to clear the area out to mortar range, so that the base could be established. It was on this operation that the battalion's first soldier, Private Errol Noack, a 21-year-old from Adelaide, South Australia, was killed. Noack was critically wounded by friendly fire during a water resupply and died of his wounds at 36th Evacuation Hospital on 24 May 1966, sixteen days after he said farewell to his family. He was also the first National Serviceman to be killed in Vietnam.

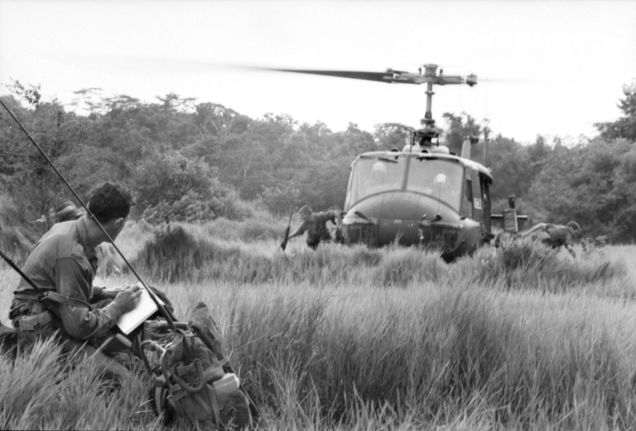
Soldiers from 5 RAR disembarking a US Army helicopter during Operation Toledo in September 1966

Other activities followed: such as the reclamation of Bình Ba (Operation Holsworthy, 7 to 18 August 1966) – a village that would figure prominently during the battalion's second tour; clearance operations following the 6RAR's action at Long Tan (Operation Darlinghurst, 26 to 31 August 1966); clearance of the Nui Thi Vai feature to secure Route 15 (Operation Canberra, 6 to 10 October 1966); operations against the village cadres (such as Operation Beaumaris, 13 to 14 February 1967); and searches of the Vietcong (VC) base areas in the Long Hải Hills (Operation Renmark, 18 – 22 February 1967).

Attempting to restore the control of the South Vietnamese Government to the areas of population which had been cut off by the VC, who controlled many of the villages and the supply routes between the towns, was a key focus for the battalion. It therefore attempted to drive out the village cadres and VC through cordon and search operations, numerous successful ambushes, and by establishing a good local intelligence network – largely through close relations with the senior members of each village. Many of the villagers did not support the VC due to the heavy taxes they levied, the manner in which they restricted civilian travel to the various markets for trade and because they conscripted those of military age. As the battalion did not have the manpower to patrol the areas in the north of the province in search of regular VC units, they chose to concentrate on the villages in an attempt to destroy the VC power base. This resulted in cordon and search operations of Duc My, Binh Ba, Ngai Giao, Phuoc Hoa, Xuyen Moc and on Long Sơn Island. These operations were largely successful and the techniques developed in their execution were to be accepted and used throughout the Australian Army.

Another sign of the innovations used by the battalion was the raising, in October 1966, of the first specialist Reconnaissance Platoon to be used in Vietnam. 'Prior to the arrival of 5 RAR only 24,775 of the inhabitants of Phuoc Tuy Province were under South Vietnamese Government control in 24 hamlets. However, by April 1967, 98,408 villagers were under Government control in 105 hamlets. 5 RAR killed 70 Viet Cong... Many hundreds more Viet Cong were captured either in conventional operations or during cordon and search operations. However, the important statistics of the battalion's tour remain the number of Vietnamese people who supported the Vietnamese Government and the degree of Government control established by 5 RAR during their first tour of Vietnam. 5 RAR had laid a sturdy platform for future battalions due to their innovative use of tactics, hard training, the professionalism with which they carried out their tasks and the subsequent respect won from the Vietnamese people'.

In total the 5th Battalion conducted eighteen separate operations before it handed responsibility over to 7th Battalion. The battalion returned to Australia in April 1967 and marched through the streets of Sydney on 16 May 1967; 25 men were killed in action or died of wounds, while 79 were wounded in action.

=== Second tour of Vietnam ===
The 5th Battalion commenced its second tour of South Vietnam in February 1969, this time under the command of Lieutenant Colonel C.N. Khan. After shaking out for two weeks, the battalion began a reconnaissance in force in the northern and eastern parts of the rugged Nui Dinh mountain complex on 1 March 1969 – Operations Quintus Thrust I and II. Other activities followed: reacting to a significant threat against US forces in the Long Binh and Bien Hoa areas (Operations Federal and Overlander, 10 March to 8 April 1969); ambushing in the Nui Thi Vai mountain complex (Operation Twickenham I, 2 to 13 May 1969); the Battle of Binh Ba, for which the Royal Australian Regiment received a battle honour for its action against a battalion of the PAVN 33rd Regiment (Operation Hammer, 6 to 8 June 1969); operations to locate and destroy the VC D445 Battalion (Operation Kingston, 14 September to 15 October 1969); and cordon and searches of the hamlets of Duc Trung, Binh Ba and Duc My (Operations Bondi I and II, 27 December to 16 February 1970).

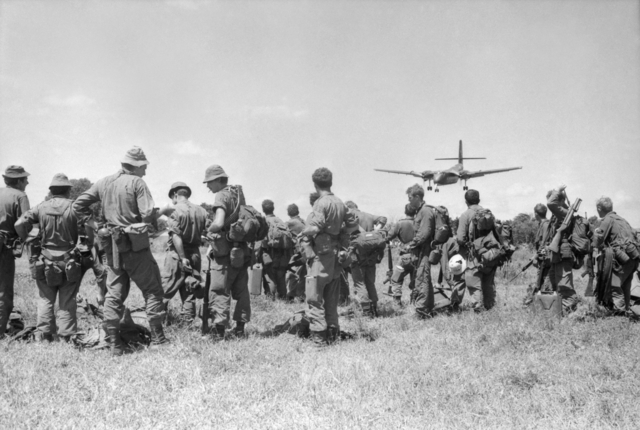
5 RAR soldiers waiting to be picked up by a RAAF de Havilland Canada DHC-4 Caribou at the conclusion of a month-long operation in October 1969

'During the second tour the emphasis [of operations] turned more towards route denial and conventional operations involving seeking out and closing with the guerilla and Main Force units such as D445 Battalion and 274 Regiment. Ambush and reconnaissance tasks were also conducted at platoon and company level. Attacks and the clearance of bunker systems played a major part of operations... The tour [also] saw the extensive use of Australian and United States M113 APCs in support of tasks... Towards the end of the tour, elements of the battalion also contributed to the pacification process through the construction of schools and housing and through the provision of medical and dental support to such villages as Ong Trinh and Phuoc Le'. Operations were also characterised by a higher number of mine incidents than had been experienced previously. 'The majority of the mines were taken by the VC from a barrier minefield laid by the Australians between the Horseshoe and Phước Hải. The enemy used these mines offensively rather than using them to protect their bases. The VC would lay the mines on tracks, in likely ambush and harbour locations, and around houses and villages. During Operations Esso I, II and III in June and July 1969, special precautions were taken to counter the problem of mines. Special training was conducted, all vehicle floors were sandbagged, flak jackets and helmets worn whenever possible, and mine detectors used by all patrols. Despite these precautions, seven soldiers were killed and 43 were wounded by mines on these operations alone'.

Arguably the most well known action ever fought by the 5th Battalion was the Battle of Binh Ba, which took place between 6 and 8 June 1969 and saw the defeat of a well armed and determined People's Army of Vietnam (PAVN) battalion. The action began at 08:10 hours on 6 June when a Centurion tank and armoured recovery vehicle moving to a fire support base manned by 6 RAR was fired on by a rocket propelled grenade (RPG) from one of the houses in the village, located about 3 miles (4.8 km) north of the Australian Task Force base at Nui Dat. D Company, 5 RAR was the Task Force quick reaction force, which also included a tank troop and an APC troop, and was sent out in response to a request for assistance from the local District chief. Whilst determining that the village was clear of civilians, the force came under heavy RPG fire. The Commanding Officer's Tactical Party and B Company joined the action at midday, with B Company being placed in a blocking position to the east of the village. By this time D Company and its supporting arms had fought their way into the centre of the village. 'The fighting was so fierce and confused for two hours that a detailed description is impossible'. By 14:00 hours D Company formed up west of the village and began a second sweep, with infantry leading and the tanks and APCs close behind. A difficult combined arms clearance supported by Bushranger helicopter gunships and artillery then took place against determined opposition of the 1st Battalion of the PAVN 33rd Regiment. 'The raw leadership of the soldiers was outstanding. Of the twenty one rifle sections involved, twelve were commanded by private soldiers. Two platoons were led by sergeants and one by a corporal... The sweep stopped at last light with the whole force exhausted after eight hours of continual contact'. The clearance of the village and surrounding areas continued over the next two days, involving much of the battalion. Arthur Burke 'at the gun end of 105 Battery' wrote, 'We've fired more rounds in the last 48 hours than the first 20 days of last month – 2,000 rounds'. One Australian was killed and eight wounded during the battle, whilst more than 90 VC and PAVN soldiers were known to have been killed.

At the conclusion of its second tour the 5th Battalion again handed over to the 7th Battalion. By the time it returned home in February 1970, the battalion had carried out some 18 operations during its twelve-month operational tour and suffered 25 men killed or died of wounds, and 202 wounded in action. During its two operational tours in South Vietnam, the battalion received 45 honours and awards, including two Distinguished Service Orders, two Distinguished Conduct Medals, six Military Crosses, one Medal for Gallantry, five Military Medals, and 29 Mentions in Despatches. (Note: Some soldiers that served during the war were recommended for an Imperial honour or award by the highest level of command in Vietnam, but either did not receive the award or had the award downgraded in Australia. This occurred in part because of the 'quota system', laid down in an Imperial War Office instruction and applied to ground troops in Vietnam on the scale of 1 award per 250 people for each six months. This matter was addressed with the Vietnam End of War List when recognition under the Australian awards system was offered. For example, John Burridge was cited for the Military Medal whilst serving as a private soldier in D Company during the battalion's second tour but was not recognised for his courage in action until he received the Medal for Gallantry in 1999. See: Mr Noel Tanzer AC, Major General Peter Phillips AO MC (retd), and Mr Clive Mitchell-Taylor, Report of the Independent Review Panel of the End of War List – Vietnam, August 1999.)

=== Linking with 7th Battalion ===
Following Australia's withdrawal of military forces from Vietnam in 1972 the government of the day decided that it would not sustain nine battalions of regular infantry. Rather than see units disbanded permanently it was decided that six units would be linked as a temporary measure so as to preserve their history, customs and traditions. Regimental Standing Orders noted hopefully: 'it is anticipated that, at sometime in the future, battalions will revert to their original identity'. So on 3 December 1973 the 5th and 7th Battalions, then serving together at Holsworthy, were linked in a formal parade. Thus was born the 5th/7th Battalion. The other linked battalions formed by this sometimes emotional process were 2/4 RAR and 8/9 RAR.

5/7 RAR initially served in the light role before undertaking a mechanised trial in the early 1980s, which led to the adoption of the mechanised role in 1984. During its 33-year existence 5/7 RAR conducted three operational tours as a unit. The first was to East Timor from October 1999 to April 2000. This deployment saw the unit serve with the International Force in East Timor (INTERFET) and then as the first Australian Battalion (or AUSBATT I) under the United Nations Transitional Authority in East Timor (UNTAET). The unit later served a second UN tour of East Timor as AUSBATT VII from October 2002 to May 2003. The third operational tour was as the Al Muthanna Task Group 2 (AMTG 2) in Iraq from November 2005 to May 2006. 5/7 RAR also had sub-unit level deployments to Iraq (such as D Company as Security Detachment 5 in Baghdad in 2004 and B Company with AMTG 1 in 2005) and Solomon Islands, as well as a number of other deployments involving small groups or individuals to such places as Rwanda, Cambodia, and Bougainville.

=== Return to the order of battle ===
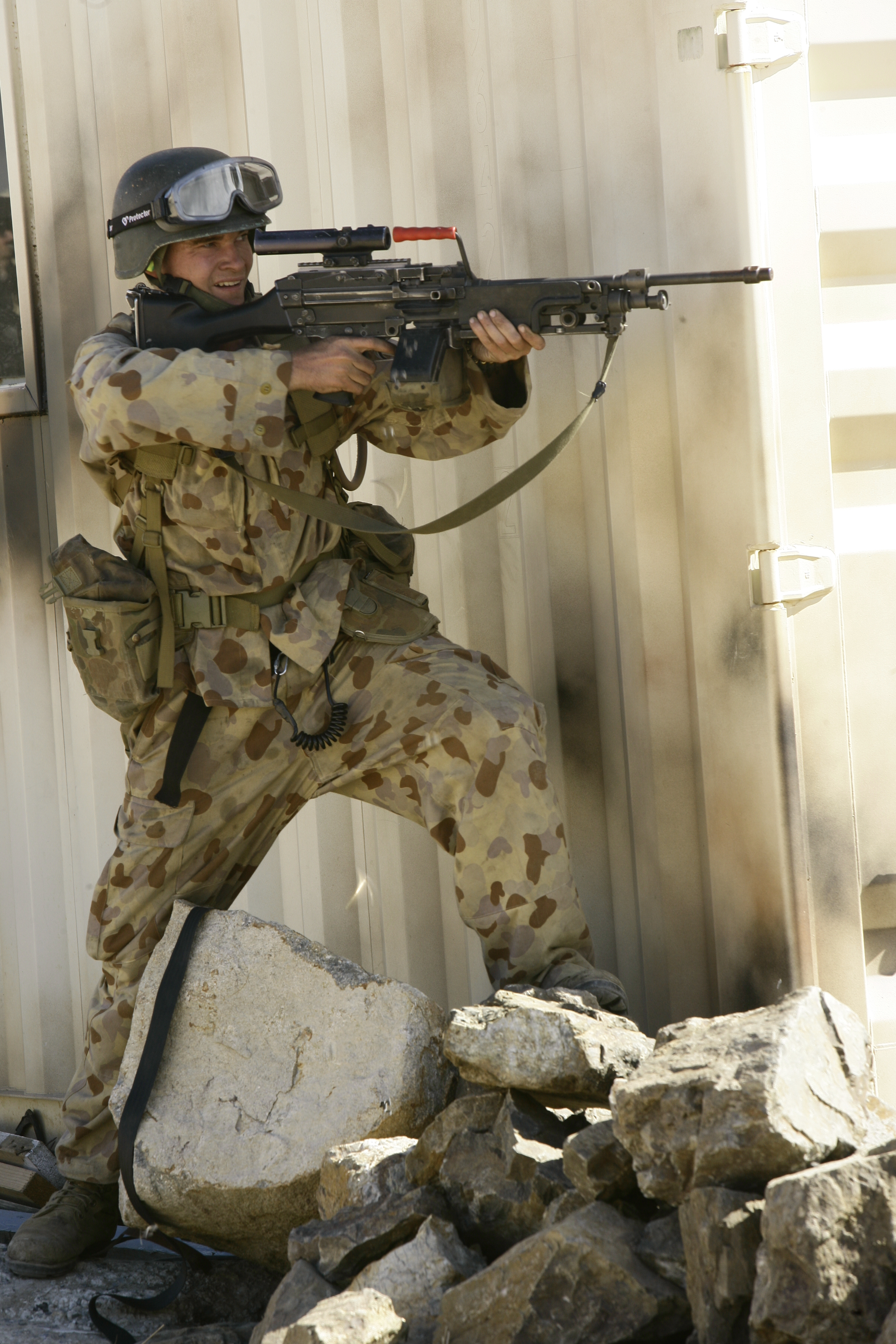
A 5 RAR soldier during Exercise Talisman Sabre 2009

In 2006 the Australian Government announced that it would expand the Army to meet operational commitments, this time from six to eight regular infantry battalions. As such the 5th/7th Battalion conducted a de-linking parade on 3 December 2006, reforming as the 5th and 7th Battalions – an event warmly welcomed by the veterans of both battalion associations. At the time of the de-linking D Company, 5/7 RAR was serving as a part of Overwatch Battle Group (West) 2 in southern Iraq and B Company 5/7 RAR was serving with the 1st Reconstruction Task Force in Afghanistan. Battalion headquarters, Support Company, C and D Companies, and most of Logistics Company became 5 RAR, whilst B Company joined 7 RAR's newly raised headquarters and A Company. The two battalions remained at Binh Ba Lines in a mixture of 5/7 RAR's old buildings and temporary accommodation until 7 RAR's new facilities, Horseshoe Lines, were completed in Adelaide.

=== Iraq ===
The invasion of Iraq in 2003 saw not only the overthrow of Saddam Hussein's Ba'athist regime by coalition forces in a three-week campaign but also the beginning of a violent insurgency and, in time, a Sunni-Shia civil war and widespread communal violence. In 2005, amidst much debate about the success or otherwise of coalition operations to stabilise Iraq, the Australian Government announced that it would deploy a battle group to southern Iraq, filling a gap that would have otherwise been created by the withdrawal of a Dutch unit. Initially known as the Al Muthanna Task Group (AMTG) this combined arms organisation was officially tasked with providing security to the Japanese Iraq Reconstruction Support Group (JIRSG) undertaking humanitarian assistance and conducting construction work in Al Muthanna. On 13 July 2006 Al Muthanna became the first Governorate to transition to what the Multi-National Force-Iraq (MNF-I) called 'provincial Iraqi control'. At this time the role of the Australian battle group changed to 'overwatch' and AMTG 3 was renamed as the first Overwatch Battle Group (West) (OBG(W) 1). The unit also redeployed from its base, Camp Smitty (which was originally named by the Dutch), just outside Al Muthanna's capital As Samawah to the coalition forward operating base (FOB) known as Camp Adder located at the airbase south of Tallil, Dhi Qar.

D Company, 5/7 RAR (Combat Team Tiger) was part of the fourth battle group rotation to Iraq (OBG(W) 2) led by 2nd Cavalry Regiment and commenced its six-month tour in late 2006. On 22 September 2006 Dhi Qar became the second Governorate to move to provincial Iraqi control, prompting the Italian Government to withdraw its 1,600 troops from the province as the Iraqis 'moved into the lead'. Although the Italian Defence Minister had declared 'la misiona completa' for their deployment in southern Iraq, Coalition operations continued and the Australian battle group of about 500 people became responsible for overwatch in both Al Muthanna (population 550,000) and Dhi Qar (population 1.5 million). The tour was a busy one for the members of D Company who, following the de-linking of 5/7 RAR, became the first element of 5 RAR to serve on operations since the unit returned from Vietnam in 1970.

In March 2007 5 RAR was warned to lead the fifth Australian unit rotation in southern Iraq (OBG(W) 3). The 5 RAR battle group was based on the battalion's headquarters and included an infantry-heavy combat team of two rifle platoons and a cavalry troop (Combat Team Sabre), a cavalry-heavy combat team of two cavalry troops and a rifle platoon (Combat Team Courage), a 'battle group reserve' based on one cavalry troop and one infantry platoon, a combat service support team (Combat Team Quintus) to provide logistics, and a range of specialist supporting arms and services. Combat Team Sabre's task organisation was based on C Company, 5 RAR and included: two rifle platoons; a troop detached from A Squadron, 2nd Cavalry Regiment; 2 Troop, B Squadron 3rd/4th Cavalry Regiment (known since Vietnam by the nickname 'Snoop Troop') which crewed the combat team's Bushmaster 'Protected Mobility Vehicles'; a forward observer party from 8th/12th Medium Regiment Royal Australian Artillery; and other specialists. The 5 RAR Battle Group deployed into theatre in late May 2007 to Camp Terendak (Note: Camp Terendak in Iraq was named after the garrison of the same name located on the Malacca coast in Malaysia where battalions of the Royal Australian Regiment served in the late 1950s and early 1960s.) at Tallil and the transition of authority between the 2nd Cavalry and 5 RAR battle groups took place in early June 2007. Over the next six month the 5 RAR battle group, part of 1st (UK) Mechanised Brigade in Multi-National Division (South East) conducted counter-insurgency operations as part of an economy-of-force supporting effort to stabilize the southern provinces while the British operated against Shia militias in Basrah and the Americans focused on securing Baghdad and leveraging the Sunni 'awakening' as part of 'the Surge'. When Battle Group Tiger rotated out of theatre shortly before Christmas 2007 it was replaced by the sixth and last Australian unit to serve in Iraq, which was withdrawn at the Australian Government's direction in June 2008.

The complex nature of the environment in Iraq in 2006–07 as part of 'the Surge' resulted in a wide range of security, stability and counter-insurgency operations conducted under difficult conditions. Soldiers patrolled extensively by day and night as a part of framework operations, set ambushes ('counter improvised explosive device patrols' in the politically correct terminology of the time) to retain freedom of action astride the approaches to Tallil and coalition lines of communication northwards to Baghdad, and sought to disrupt the indirect fire threat to the Coalition FOB. Direct fire contacts with insurgents took place during both tours in 2006–07 and ranged from fleeting engagements to the series of contacts involving OBG(W) 2 elements over 48 hours on 23 and 24 April 2006. Soldiers also experienced enemy indirect fire and improvised explosive devices. Both tours saw personnel wounded in action but fortunately neither battle group suffered any killed in action. The 5 RAR Battle Group regularly provided support to strike operations undertaken by United States Special Forces, including a mission late 2007 that resulted in the detention of a Corps-level high-value target. In July 2007 the 5 RAR battle group also seized two bridges in An Nasiriyah as part of a challenging passage of lines operation with the British Army's Kings Royal Hussars Battle Group. During both tours members of 5 RAR trained and mentored the Iraqi Army and Police, as well as undertaking construction and reconstruction work to shape the operating environment. Lieutenant Colonel Jake Ellwood was awarded the Distinguished Service Cross for his command and leadership in action as the commanding officer of OBG(W) 3.

=== East Timor ===
In October 2008 5 RAR deployed again, this time as Timor Leste Battle Group 5 on Operation Astute, as part of the International Stabilisation Force in East Timor. After handing over to 2 RAR, the battalion returned to Australia in June 2009.

=== Afghanistan ===
5 RAR's involvement in Afghanistan began modestly in October 2008 when one of the battalion's mortar sections deployed with the 7 RAR battle group to conduct operations in Uruzugan Province. The deployment of an infantry-led battle group – at this time known as Mentoring and Reconstruction Task Force Two (MRTF 2) – marked a change away from the engineer-led reconstruction activities begun in 2006 towards a wider range of operations, especially building the capacity of the Afghan National Army. The deployment also marked the first time that a mortar section from the battalion fired high explosive rounds to support friendly troops in contact since the Vietnam War. A larger commitment followed in September 2010 when, as part of the evolving mission, 5 RAR deployed as Mentoring Task Force Two (MTF-2). The 5 RAR battle group was one of two units that made up the main fighting force of what was effectively a small coalition brigade called Combined Team Uruzgan (CTU). The U.S. 1–2 Stryker Regiment initially served in CTU with 5 RAR until March 2011 when it was replaced by the U.S. 4–70 Armoured Regiment. MTF-2 represented the first time since the 1999 intervention in East Timor that Battalion headquarters, all three rifle companies (B, C and D), and Support Company deployed as a unit. Within Support Company, the mortar platoon, signals platoon and snipers deployed in-role, while reconnaissance and surveillance platoon and anti-armour platoon deployed as infantry rather than as specialist platoons.

Mentoring the Afghan National Army personnel of the 4th Brigade, 205th Hero Corps was an important part of the 5 RAR battle group's mission. Consequently, the sub-units did not deploy as doctrinal rifle companies but were instead task-organised as Mentoring Combat Teams each organized with four Operational Mentoring and Liaison Teams (OMLT) and supported by cavalry, engineer and other specialists. Each OMLT was led by an officer (either a lieutenant or a captain) and a senior soldier (a sergeant or Warrant Officer Class Two), and comprised mentoring staff (generally but not always infantry), a small infantry 'force protection element', an engineer search team, a Joint Fires Team, and a medic, who were responsible for embedding with and mentoring an Afghan infantry company within their Tactical Area of Responsibility. Whilst the 4th Brigade Headquarters were located within the Multi-National Base at Tarin Kowt, the majority of the 4th Brigade's troops operated from patrol bases and combat outposts throughout the province. This meant that each combat team was assigned a dedicated area of operations in which to work with their partnered indigenous force: CT-B operated in the Miribad region, CT-C in Deh Rawood region, CT-D in the Chora-Baluchi region, and Support Squadron who operated throughout the entire area of operations.

Together with their Afghan partners the 5 RAR battle group achieved relatively good success against the insurgents in Uruzgan in a range of deliberate clearances, strike operations, and framework activities that resulted in the recovery or capture of weapons, ammunition, enemy combatants, and the like. Perhaps most importantly, these operations assisted the Afghans to exert influence in areas where the army or police presence had been contested or where it had not previously existed. Members of 5 RAR engaged in battle with the enemy on a regular basis in contacts ranging from only a number of minutes to several hours and involving direct fire, indirect fire and improvised explosive devices. All three mortar sections fired in anger supporting troops in contact, and U.S. artillery and close air support were also utilised. MTF-2 suffered three fatalities during the tour. Corporal Richard Atkinson, an engineer from 1st Combat Engineer Regiment (1 CER) attached to CT-C was killed by an IED on 2 February 2011. Sapper Jamie Larcombe, an engineer from the 1 CER attached to Support Squadron, was killed by small arms fire on 19 February 2011 (along with an Afghan interpreter, Amiri). Lance Corporal Andrew Jones, a cook from 9th Force Support Battalion attached to CT-D as a cook at Combat Outpost Mashal was murdered by a rogue Afghan National Army soldier on 30 May 2011. In addition another nine members of MTF-2 were wounded during the deployment, a number of them seriously. 5 RAR completed its mission as the mounting unit of MTF-2 in June 2011, handing over to MTF-3, a battle group led by 2nd Battalion, Royal Australian Regiment.

== Colours ==
Queen's and Regimental Colours were first presented to the 5th Battalion whilst it was at Tobruk Lines, Holsworthy on 29 October 1967, by the then Governor of New South Wales, Sir Roden Cutler, VC, KCMG, CBE. These colours were carried alongside those of the 7th Battalion during its time as a linked battalion, with 5th Battalion's colours holding the senior position when the unit was on parade. At other times the 5th Battalion colours were displayed in the Officers' Mess, whilst those of the 7th Battalion were displayed in the Sergeants' Mess. For a time, 5/7 RAR was the only battalion in the regiment to still have its original colours, notable because the original Queen's colour was emblazoned on a Union Jack. Modern Queen's colours are emblazoned on the Australian National Flag. When the linked battalion moved to Darwin both sets of colours were displayed in Battalion headquarters. On 3 December 2003 a single set of new colours were presented to 5/7 RAR in Darwin, Northern Territory. The colours of 5th and 7th Battalions were then laid up in the Soldiers' Chapel at Kapooka, New South Wales on 23 April 2004. The laying up ceremony was attended by Brigadier Colin Khan, DSO (retd) and major General Ron Grey, AC, DSO (retd), who commanded the 5th and 7th Battalions, respectively, during their second tours of Vietnam. Many other members of the two unit associations were also in attendance.

Following the de-linking of the battalions in 2006, the 5th Battalion had need of its colours again, so the original colours were taken from the Soldiers' Chapel at Kapooka. This caused some consternation in some Army circles, with representation even being made directly to the Chief of Army's Office that the colours could not be returned to service because they were 'dead'. However, as the then Battalion Padre, Morgan Batt, pointed out, the Tiger Battalion 'was reunited with its Colours under Australian Army Regulations and Ceremonial Protocols that allow[ed] reraised units to take back their laid-up Colours...'. One might add that the battalion was not dissuaded from this task, particularly as the unit was about to deploy on operations to the Middle East. Consequently, on 14 April 2007, the 5th Battalion created a small footnote in Australian military history by being the first unit to rededicate itself to its original colours in a sunset ceremony on a hilltop at Cultana Training Area, South Australia. The battalion rededicated itself to its colours, because once consecrated colours can never be deconsecrated.

Although much loved, the original colours were in need of replacement, so following the battalion's return from Iraq, new Queens' and regimental colours were presented to the unit by Mr Thomas Pauling, QC, the administrator of the Northern Territory, in a ceremony conducted at historical East Point, Darwin, on 5 June 2008 (the eve of the anniversary of the Battle of Binh Ba). The parade was hosted by Brigadier M.G. Krause, commander of the 1st Brigade, and the principal guests were Major General M.A. Kelly, Land Commander Australia, Major General R.G. Wilson, commander 1st Division, and Brigadier M.D. Bornholt, colonel commandant of the Royal Australian Regiment. This was a particularly special occasion as the members of the 5th Battalion Association trooped with the old colours through the ranks for the last time. Major General Murray Blake (retd) received the new Queens' Colour from the senior major, the battalion's operations officer, and Captain Darryl Lovell (retd) received the new regimental colour from the junior major, the battalion's quartermaster, before they and the administrator presented them to the new colour party to be consecrated. Of note, Darryl Lovell was one of the original ensigns when the colours were first presented in 1967. This symbolism of old and new was particularly important to the unit as it was intended to connect the modern soldiers with their heritage.

== Current role and composition ==
In 2017 the battalion commenced the transition to the mechanised role with the adoption of the M113AS4 Armoured Personnel Carrier.

The battalion currently consists of:

- Battalion Headquarters
- 3 Rifle Companies – 'B', 'C' and 'D'
- Support Company
- Logistics Company

The regiment formerly sported a band that served as the only military band of Australian forces in Vietnam.

== Commanding officers and regimental sergeants major ==
=== Commanding officers ===
- 1 March to 31 August 1965 – Lieutenant Colonel P.H.G. Oxley
- 1 September 1965 to 17 November 1967 – Lieutenant Colonel J.A. Warr, DSO
- 27 November 1967 to 30 June 1970 – Lieutenant Colonel C.N. Khan, DSO
- 13 July to 13 September 1970 – Lieutenant Colonel G.O. Thompson
- 14 September 1970 to 13 January 1972 – Lieutenant Colonel J.A. Hooper
- 14 January 1972 to 2 December 1973 – Lieutenant Colonel K.E. Newman
- 3 December 2006 to 31 December 2008 – Lieutenant Colonel J.F.B. Ellwood, DSC
- 1 January 2009 to 28 June 2011 – Lieutenant Colonel D. Huxley DSC
- 29 June 2011 to 6 January 2013 – Lieutenant Colonel A. Forbes
- 7 January 2013 to 29 March 2015 – Lieutenant Colonel R. Barrett
- 30 March 2015 to December 2016 Lieutenant Colonel P. Shields MBE
- January 2017 to October 2019 – Lieutenant Colonel T. Gordon CSM
- October 2019 to December 2021 – Lieutenant Colonel M. Dirago
- December 2021 to December 2023 – Lieutenant Colonel C.D.P. Gilmore
- December 2023 to 3 December 2024 - Lieutenant Colonel H. Grogan, CSC

=== Regimental sergeants major ===
- March 1965 to January 1966 – WO1 F.J. Glynn-Armstrong
- January 1966 to October 1967 – WO1 L.T. Foale
- October 1967 to January 1968 – WO2 R.R. Burns
- January 1968 to February 1970 – WO1 C.R. Vagg
- February to July 1970 – WO2 R.G. Armitage, BEM
- July 1970 to May 1971 – WO1 R.C. Wormald
- May 1971 to December 1973 – WO1 J. McFadzean
- December 2006 to January 2008 – WO1 G. Burns
- January 2008 to December 2010 – WO1 C. Howe
- January 2011 to December 2013 – WO1 D. De Kock
- January 2014 to December 2016 – WO1 R. Rootham
- January 2017 to December 2018 – WO1 S. Ransome
- January 2019 to December 2020 – WO1 R. Munro
- January 2021 to December 2022 - WO1 S. Casey
- December 2022 to 3 December 2024 - WO1 B. Foster, OAM, CSM

== Alliances ==
- United Kingdom – Welsh Guards (Note: Greetings are exchanged on St David's Day / 5 RAR's birthday, the two occasions coinciding on 1 March.)

== Notes ==
Footnotes

Citations
