= Kathryn Toohey =

Australian general

- Military career
- Allegiance: Australia
- Branch: Australian Army
- Service years: 1987–2023
- Rank: Major General
- Commands: Force Integration Division; Head Land Capability; Director-General Integrated Capability Development
- Conflicts: United Nations Transitional Authority in Cambodia
- Awards: Member of the Order of Australia; Conspicuous Service Cross
- Other work: Deputy Electoral Commissioner, AEC (2016)

Major General Kathryn Leslei Toohey, AM, CSC is a retired senior officer of the Australian Army. She served as Head of Land Capability from 2017 to 2019, and Head Force Integration Division within the Vice Chief of the Defence Force Group from June 2019 to January 2023.

== Army career ==
Toohey entered the Australian Defence Force Academy as an Australian Army officer cadet in 1987. She graduated in 1989 with a Bachelor of Electrical Engineering from the affiliated University of New South Wales (UNSW) and, following further training at the Royal Military College, Duntroon, was commissioned into the Royal Australian Corps of Signals in 1990. She completed an Honours degree at UNSW in 1991, before receiving her first posting as a troop commander with the 2nd Signals Regiment.

Toohey has also had postings in the 7th Signal Regiment (Electronic Warfare), 1st Brigade Headquarters, in the Strategic Operations Division of Headquarters Northern Command, and 13 months as a troop commander in the Force Communications Unit as part of the United Nations Transitional Authority in Cambodia. She has served in staff appointments in the Capability Development Group (CDG) and its successor Capability Acquisition and Sustainment Group (CASG) and in Force Development Group. Toohey was awarded a Conspicuous Service Cross in the 2008 Queen's Birthday Honours for her role in the development of Military Satellite Communications. In 2009, she served as the European Liaison Officer for CDG, representing the Australian Defence Force at multinational, NATO and European Union fora. In 2012, Toohey was director of the Capability and Technology Management College.

Toohey took leave from the army in 2016 to assume the statutory appointment of Deputy Electoral Commissioner in the Australian Electoral Commission. Upon her return to the army in 2017, she was promoted to the rank of major general and appointed as the Head of Land Capability.

Toohey was appointed a Member of the Order of Australia in the 2017 Queen's Birthday Honours for "exceptional service to the Australian Defence Force in the fields of capability development and education." She relinquished command of Land Capability in June 2019 and was appointed Head Force Integration Division within the Vice Chief of the Defence Force Group.

Military offices
| Preceded by Air Vice Marshal Stephen Meredith | Head Force Integration Division; 2019–2023 | Succeeded by Air Vice Marshal Robert Denney |
