= List of ships of the Australian Army =

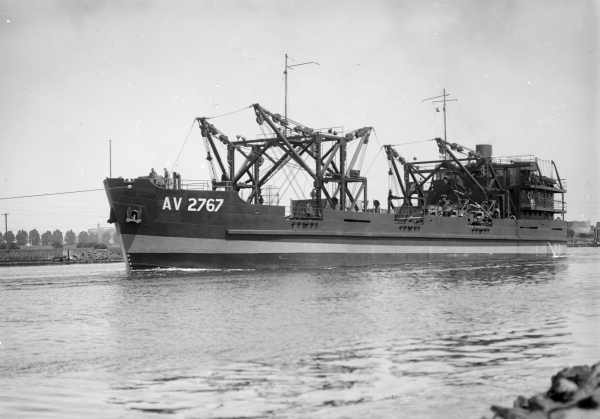
AV 2767 Crusader in December 1945

The Australian Army has operated numerous ships and watercraft.

== Vessel classifications ==
- AB - Army Barges & Landing Craft
- AH - Army Sea Ambulances
- AK - Army Ketches and Schooners
- AL - Army Luggers
- AM - Army Motor Launches
- AS - Army Ships & Army Trawlers
- AT - Army Tugs
- AV - Army Vessels

== Currently active ships/vessels ==
- AM 1353 Coral Snake
- 14 x LCM-8 landing craft
- 12 x LARC-V amphibious cargo vehicle

== Former vessels ==
=== A ===
- AM4 Australian Sun
- AM18 Air Wave Destroyed by fire 28 March 1944
- AS23 Amiriya
- AM38 Amity
- AM47 Aphlow
- AM51 Anna B
- AT71 Acme
- AT80 Active
- AM88 Avalon
- AK82 Alma Doepel
- AK94 Abel Tasman
- AK96 Arga
- AT99 Alexandra
- AK121 Ardetta
- AD155 Alan
- AD155 Alf returned to owner
- AL215 Aroha Lost at sea 3 May 1943
- AL222 Alidine
- AL224 Alcia transferred to RAAF June 1943
- AL231 Arawa transferred to RAAF June 1943
- AL233 Athalia
- AL236 Adiana
- AL244 Amy
- AL270 Agatha
- AM485 Ann
- AM492 Ad
- AM496 Ainavia
- AM543 Aspro
- AM546 Aero
- AK553 Aramia
- AM557 Annabelle
- AM568 Ailsa
- AM1475 Alatna
- AV1356 Ashburton

=== B ===
- AL 229 Beatrice
- AV 1354 Brudenell White
- AT 167 Bucra

=== C ===
- AV 1356 Clive Steele
- AV 2767 Crusader
- AS 16 Curzon. On March 17, 1943, at Tufi jetty, in Papua while unloading supplies just astern of PT67 and PT119 (of the US Navy), caught fire and was destroyed. PT 67 and PT 119 were also destroyed.

=== D ===
- AV 2082 Dora

=== E ===
- AS 28 Elive Star
- AV 2075 Emily
- AV 2058 Ermine

=== F ===
- AB 442 Francis Peat
- AT 2382 Freda

=== G ===
- AV 1355 Gascoyne
- AB 20 George Peat
- AV 1358 Greenough
- AV 279 Gundiah

=== H ===
- AV 1353 Harry Chauvel

=== J ===
- AT 2700 Joe Mann
- AS 3051 John Monash

=== K ===
- AB 97 Kalang

=== L ===
- AS 129 Lady Ruth
- AV 1369 Lagunta
- AS3050 "Lerida" 66 feet Wooden Cargo Vessel (Trawler Design)

=== M ===
- AS 1742 Macalva
- AM 50 Malmar
- AT 2383 Mollymawk
- MSL 252
- AV 1354 Murchison

=== N ===
- AS 6 Nurls

=== R ===
- AM 417 Ross Gillett

=== T ===
- AT 2701 The Luke
- AL 228 Timena

=== V ===
- AV 1355 Vernon Sturdee

=== W ===
- AS 21 Wavell
- AM 41 Windsong I

=== Y ===
- AB 2 Yashima Maru
