= Vietnam War order of battle: Australia =

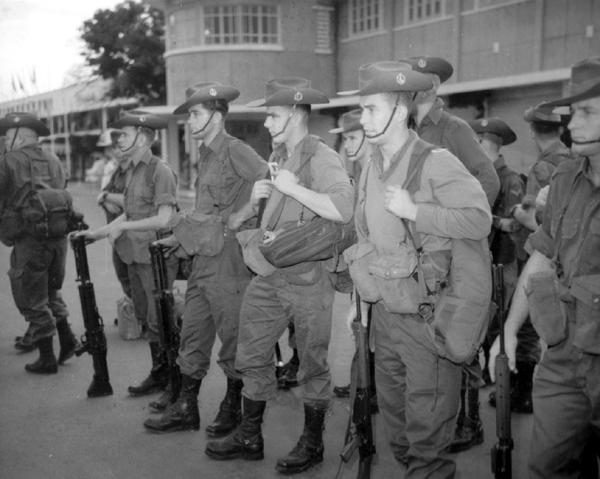
Australians arrive at Tan Son Nhut Airport, Saigon

The order of battle of Australian forces during the Vietnam War consisted of a small group of military advisors from 1962, but grew to include an infantry battalion based in Bien Hoa in 1965. This force was then replaced by a two- and later three-battalion task force with supporting arms based at Nui Dat which operated primarily in Phuoc Tuy Province between 1966–71, with logistic elements at Vung Tau. Airforce units committed initially consisted of transport aircraft, but were followed by helicopters and later bombers, while naval forces included destroyers and transport vessels. With the size of Australian forces in Vietnam reaching a peak in early 1968, a drawdown commenced in late 1970, with the bulk withdrawn by early 1972. The last elements returned to Australia in 1973. In total, around 50,000 Australians served during the Vietnam War, including 42,437 members of the Australian Army, 3,310 from the Royal Australian Navy (RAN), and 4,443 from the Royal Australian Air Force (RAAF), with casualties including 519 killed and 2,348 wounded. (Note: In Australian Army units the standard tour of duty for units and individuals in Vietnam was 12 months, after which they would be replaced. Rotation was of formed units, with individual reinforcements used to replace casualties.)

== Australian Army ==
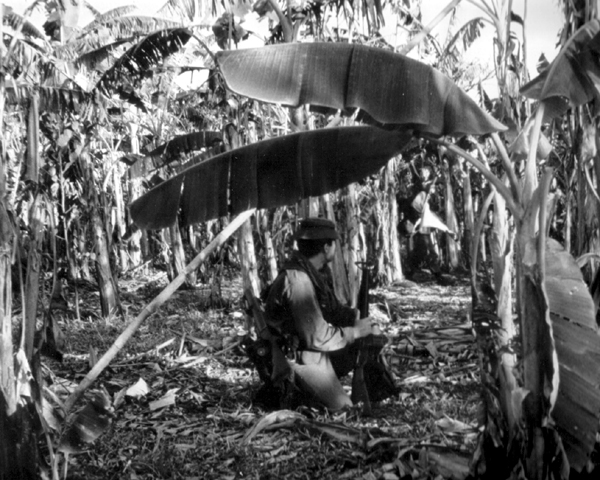
Australian soldier during operations in Phuoc Tuy

- Australian Army Training Team Vietnam (AATTV) – Saigon (July 1962 – December 1972)
- Australian Army Force Vietnam (AAFV) – Saigon (May 1965 – May 1966)
  - 709 Sig Tp (includes 527 Sig Tp)
- 1st Battalion, Royal Australian Regiment (1 RAR) Battle Group – Bien Hoa (May 1965 – July 1966)
  - 1st APC Troop – M113 Armoured Personnel Carriers (June 1965 – May 1966)
  - 105th Field Battery, Royal Australian Artillery (September 1965 – March 1966)
  - 3rd Field Troop (September 1965 – March 1966)
  - 161st Reconnaissance Flight – Bell Sioux Light Observation Helicopters and Cessna 180s – Bien Hoa (September 1965 – March 1966)
- 1st Australian Logistic Support Company – Bien Hoa (May 1965 – March 1966) (Note: Redesignated 1 ALSG in 1966 following deployment of 1 ATF.)
- Australian Force Vietnam (AFV) – Saigon (May 1966 – March 1972)
  - 145 Sig Sqn (April 1966 – March 1967)
  - 110 Sig Sqn (March 1967 – March 1972)
- 1st Australian Task Force (1 ATF) – Nui Dat (April 1966 – March 1972)
  - Infantry:
    - Royal Australian Regiment:
      - 1st Battalion, Royal Australian Regiment (1 RAR) (January 1968 – January 1969)
      - 2nd Battalion, Royal Australian Regiment (2 RAR) (March 1967 – June 1968 and April 1970 – June 1971)
      - 3rd Battalion, Royal Australian Regiment (3 RAR) (December 1967 – December 1968 and February – October 1971)
      - 4th Battalion, Royal Australian Regiment (4 RAR) (January 1968 – May 1969 and May 1970 – March 1972)
      - 5th Battalion, Royal Australian Regiment (5 RAR) (April 1966 – July 1967 and January 1969 – March 1970)
      - 6th Battalion, Royal Australian Regiment (6 RAR) (April 1966 – July 1967 and May 1969 – May 1970)
      - 7th Battalion, Royal Australian Regiment (7 RAR) (April 1967 – April 1968 and February 1970 – March 1971)
      - 8th Battalion, Royal Australian Regiment (8 RAR) (November 1969 – November 1970)
      - 9th Battalion, Royal Australian Regiment (9 RAR) (November 1968 – December 1969)
    - Special Air Service Regiment:
      - 1st Squadron (March 1967 – February 1968 and February 1970 – February 1971)
      - 2nd Squadron (January 1968 – March 1969 and February – October 1971)
      - 3rd Squadron (April 1966 – July 1967 and February 1969 – February 70)
  - Armour:
    - 1st APC Squadron – M113 Armoured Personnel Carriers (May 1966 – January 1967)
    - A Squadron, 3rd Cavalry Regiment – M113 Armoured Personnel Carriers (January 1967 – May 1969)
    - B Squadron, 3rd Cavalry Regiment – M113 Armoured Personnel Carriers (May 1969 – January 1971)
    - A Squadron, 1st Armoured Regiment – Centurion tanks (December 1969 – December 1970)
    - B Squadron, 1st Armoured Regiment – Centurion tanks (February – December 1969)
    - C Squadron, 1st Armoured Regiment – Centurion tanks (February 1968 – February 1969 and December 1970)
    - Detachment, 1st Forward Delivery Troop (January 1968 – July 1971)
  - Artillery:
    - 1st Field Regiment, Royal Australian Artillery (April 1966 – July 1967 and February 1969 – May 1970)
      - 101st Field Battery, Royal Australian Artillery (1966–67 and 1969–70)
      - 103rd Field Battery, Royal Australian Artillery (1966–67)
      - 105th Field Battery, Royal Australian Artillery (1969–70)
    - 4th Field Regiment, Royal Australian Artillery (March 1967 – May 1968 and February 1970 – March 1971)
      - 106th Field Battery, Royal Australian Artillery (1967–68 and 1970–71)
      - 107th Field Battery, Royal Australian Artillery (1970–71)
      - 108th Field Battery, Royal Australian Artillery (1967–68)
    - 12th Field Regiment, Royal Australian Artillery (January 1968 – March 1969 and January 1971 – December 1971)
      - A Field Battery, Royal Australian Artillery (1971)
      - 102nd Field Battery, Royal Australian Artillery (1968–69)
      - 104th Field Battery, Royal Australian Artillery (1968–69 and 1971)
    - 131st Divisional Locating Battery, Royal Australian Artillery (1966–71)
  - Engineers:
    - 1st Field Squadron (April 1966 – November 1971)
    - 21st Engineer Support Troop (April 1966 – December 1971)
  - Aviation:
    - 161st Reconnaissance Flight – Bell Sioux Light Observation Helicopters, Cessna 180s, Cessna Bird Dog and Pilatus Porters – Vung Tau / Nui Dat (April 1966 – March 1972)
  - Intelligence:
    - Detachment, 1st Divisional Intelligence Unit (April 1966 – November 1971)
    - 1st Psychological Operations Unit (April 1970 – November 1971)
  - Signals:
    - 103 Sig Sqn (April 1966 – April 1967)
    - 104 Sig Sqn (April 1967 – December 1971)
- 1st Australian Logistic Support Group (1 ALSG) – Vung Tau (April 1966 – October 1971)
- 1st Australian Civil Affairs Unit – Nui Dat and Vung Tau (March 1967 – November 1971)

== Royal Australian Air Force ==
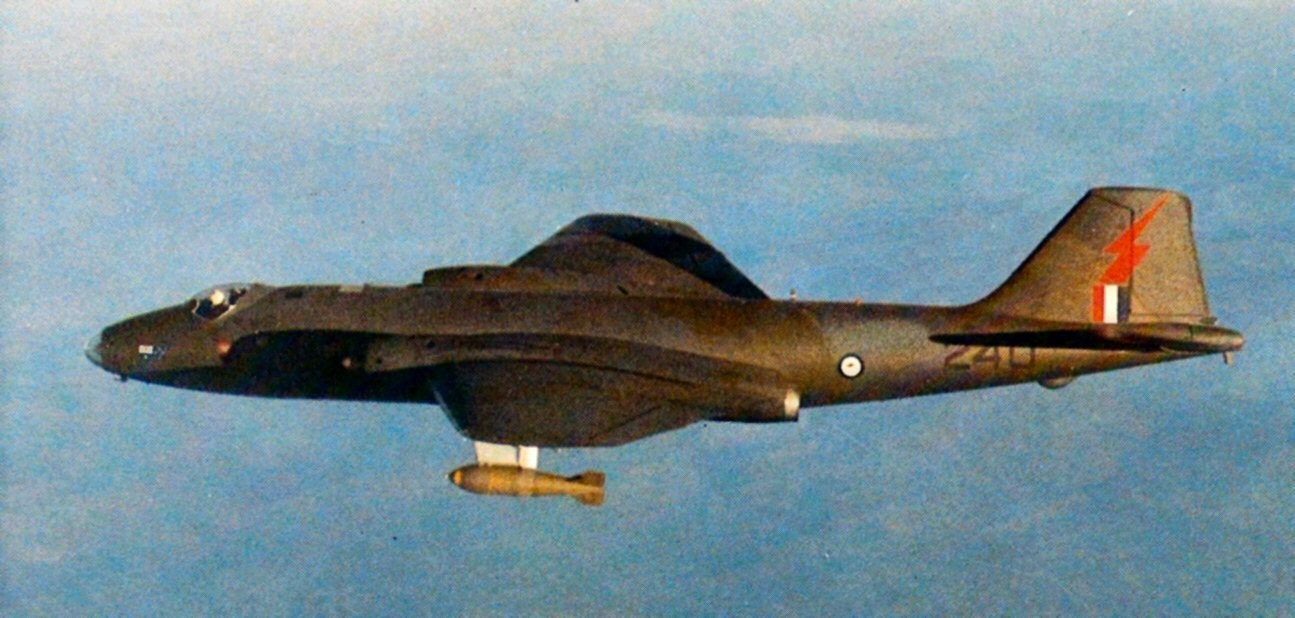
A Canberra bomber from No. 2 Squadron RAAF operating over South Vietnam.

- Transport:
  - RAAF Transport Flight Vietnam – DHC-4 Caribous – Butterworth / Vung Tau (April 1964 – June 1966) (Note: Redesignated No. 35 Squadron RAAF in 1966.)
  - No. 35 Squadron RAAF – DHC-4 Caribous – Vung Tau (June 1966 – February 1972)
- Helicopter:
  - No. 9 Squadron RAAF – UH-1 Iroquois – Vung Tau (June 1966 – December 1971)
- Bomber:
  - No. 2 Squadron RAAF – English Electric Canberras – Phan Ran (April 1967 – June 1971) (attached to USAF 35th Tactical Fighter Wing)
- Other units:
  - No. 1 Operational Support Unit (February 1968 – February 1972)
  - No. 5 Airfield Construction Squadron RAAF (May 1966 – February 1968)

== Royal Australian Navy ==
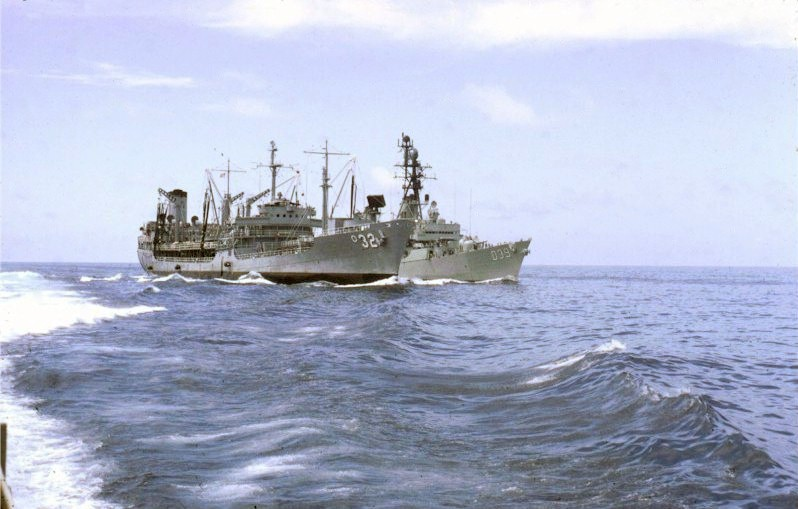
HMAS Hobart refueling from a United States Navy tanker while operating off Vietnam in 1967

- Destroyers:
  - HMAS Brisbane (D 41) (March – October 1968 and March – October 1971)
  - HMAS Perth (D 38) (September 1967 – April 1968, September 1968 – April 1969 and September 1970 – April 1971)
  - HMAS Hobart (D 39) (March – September 1967, March – October 1968 and March – October 1970)
  - HMAS Vendetta (D08) (September 1969 – April 1970)
- Supply and transport:
  - HMAS Jeparit (June 1966 – March 1972)
  - HMAS Boonaroo (March – May 1967)
  - HMAS Sydney (R17) (May 1965 – March 1972)
- Other units:
  - Clearance Diving Team 3 – Vung Tau (February 1967 – April 1971)
  - RAN Helicopter Flight Vietnam – UH-1 Iroquois – Vung Tau / Blackhorse / Bearcat / Dong Tam (October 1967 – June 1971)

== See also ==
- Military history of Australia during the Vietnam War

== Notes ==
Footnotes

Citations
