= 1st Australian Logistic Support Group =

- 1 Australian Logistic Support Group sign at entrance to the base area at Vung Tau
- Active: 22 March 1966 – 16 October 1971
- Country: Australia
- Branch: Australian Army
- Type: Logistic
- Engagements: Vietnam War

The 1st Australian Logistic Support Group (1 ALSG) was a ground support unit of the Australian Army during the Vietnam War and was located in Vũng Tàu. 1 ALSG commanded logistic support units for Australian forces in South Vietnam and was composed of engineer, transport, ordnance, medical and service corps units. It was formed in Australia in March 1966 and deployed to South Vietnam the following month.

== Background ==
On 29 April 1965, the Prime Minister of Australia, Sir Robert Menzies, announced that his government had decided to send an infantry battalion to South Vietnam. While it was still deploying, the Chief of the General Staff, Lieutenant GeneralJohn Wilton contemplated sending a brigade-sized task force to Vietnam. The larger formation could operate independently, and although still be under American operational control, it could respond more readily to military and political directives from Australia. On 8 March 1966, Harold Holt, who had succeeded Menzies as prime minister on 26 January, announced that a task force of 4,500 would be sent to South Vietnam in May or June 1966.

Arrangements for American logistical support were reached in a meeting between Wilton and the commander of the US Military Assistance Command, Vietnam (MACV), General William Westmoreland on 17 March 1966. The US Army agreed to provide support for the Australian forces on the same basis as the US forces. Items unique to the Australian forces were excluded. Apart from a few isolated examples, such as the substitution of the M16 rifle for the F1 submachine gun, Australian equipment was not replaced with US equivalents, and therefore remained an Australian responsibility. This particularly affected motor vehicles. Base construction resources would be provided in line with theatre priorities. In practice, as the American construction resources were already overwhelmed, base development became an Australian responsibility.

Wilton and Mackay selected Phước Tuy province as the area of operations for the 1st Australian Task Force (1 ATF) and Nui Dat as its base. Australian logistics would be located at Vũng Tàu, about 30 kilometres by road south of Nui Dat. The town, which had a population of about 57,000 in 1967, was primarily a beach resort with bars and nightclubs used as a rest area by allied forces and allegedly the Viet Cong. Vũng Tàu already had a port and an airport. Vung Tau Air Base was operated by the US Air Force's 8th Aerial Port Squadron. The all-weather main runway was 1,828 metres long and 18 metres wide and sealed with bitumen. There was also a 670 metre pierced steel plank secondary all-weather runway. Being on a peninsula eight kilometres wide and fourteen kilometres long made Vũng Tàu easy to defend. Most of it was grassland and mangrove swamp. The western side of the peninsula was sheltered from the strong winds and high swells in the dry season. However, the best sites in the area were occupied by the Vietnamese and most of the rest by the Americans. The only site Wilton could find was some sand dunes used as a rubbish tip. Although private land, it was hard to locate the owner, and Wilton secured permission to use it from the Prime Minister of South Vietnam, Nguyễn Cao Kỳ. A reconnaissance in March 1966 rejected the site as unsuitable, preferring one four kilometres north, but that land was unavailable.

== Deployment ==
1st Logistic Support Group April–May 1966
Lieutenant Colonel David Rouse

- HQ 1st Logistic Support Group
- 145 Signal Squadron
- 2 Composite Ordnance Depot
- 17 Construction Squadron
- Detachment 55 Advanced Engineer Stores Squadron
- 101 Field Workshop
- 101 Field Workshop Stores Section
- 2 Field Ambulance
- Section 33 Dental Unit
- 1 Company RAASC
- 87 Transport Platoon
- 21 Supply Platoon
- 161 Reconnaissance Flight
- 67 Ground Liaison Section
- 1 Australian Reinforcement Unit
- Detachment 176 Air Dispatch Company
- Detachment 1 Division Supply and Transportation Workshop
- Detachment 1 Division Provost Company
- Detachment 1 Division Postal Unit
- Detachment 11 Movement Control Group
- Detachment 1 Division Cash Office

The belated government announcement of the deployment of the 1st Australian Task Force (1 ATF), together with its ban on prior consultation with the Americans or specialists outside Army Headquarters and the immutable schedule and force level, generated a hasty preparation. This had severe repercussions for the operational units when they reached Vietnam, but none more so than those that affected the logistics. The planners at Army Headquarters mistakenly believed that since the Americans would be providing much of the logistic support, a reduced logistic support element could be deployed. Rather than send the existing 1st Logistic Support Force, a smaller, ad hoc formation was raised, the 1st Australian Logistic Support Group (1 ALSG). It was allocated 937 personnel out of the 4,225 to be deployed. It was hoped that the savings in manpower would permit more operational units to be deployed.

The Director of Military Operations and Plans at Army Headquarters, Brigadier Kenneth Mackay, later admitted that the Army's logistics difficulties were not merely the result of poor planning and an over-reliance on the Americans, but were systemic. Lieutenant Colonel David Rouse was appointed to command 1 ALSG. As a Royal Australian Infantry Corps officer, he was perhaps not the best qualified officer to lead a logistics formation. He was unable to secure or retain any of the experienced officers he asked for, and the composition of his headquarters staff was not finalised until a fortnight before it had to depart for South Vietnam.

Personnel were flown to Tan Son Nhut Air Base in chartered Qantas flights and thence to Vung Tau Air Base by intra-theatre transport aircraft. Stores, vehicles and some troops went by sea. The old aircraft carrier HMAS Sydney, now re-roled as a troopship, embarked 350 vehicles and 294 tons of stores and ammunition and departed Sydney for South Vietnam on 22 April. While Sydney had been able to supply the battalion group, the larger task force required more shipping, and two ships were chartered from the Australian National Line, MV Jeparit and Boonaroo. The Army also operated its own ships, including four landing ships medium (LSM) and a cargo ship, the AV John Monash. Sydney anchored off Vung Tau on 4 May and completed unloading on 6 May, when John Monash and the LSM Vernon Sturdee arrived with engineer stores for 17 Construction Squadron.

Lieutenant Colonel L. Chambers (centre), Commander of the 1st Australian Logistic Support Group (1ALSG), speaks with Lieutenant General Sir John Wilton (right), and Group Captain D. W. Colquhoun (left).

Most of the headquarters of 1 ALSG arrived at Tan Son Nhut on 20 April. The staff had to handle the arrival of the stores and the influx of 1 ATF units that were staging through Vung Tau. The remnants of the 1st Australian Logistic Support Company (1 ALSC), which had been supporting the 1st Battalion, Royal Australian Regiment (1 RAR) at Bien Hoa, were now being absorbed into 1 ALSG. They established catering, refrigeration and accommodation facilities at Vung Tau to the best of their ability. Unfortunately, the stores they brought with them from Bien Hoa were simply dumped rather than being sorted. A similar fate awaited the stores unloaded from Sydney, John Monash and Vernon Sturdee.

The establishment of 1 ALSG was manifestly inadequate for its role, and its authorised personnel was increased from 937 in March to 1,147 in October. However, the additional personnel were attached, not assigned, and its establishment was unchanged. Rouse was succeeded by Lieutenant Colonel Laurence Chambers, a Royal Australian Army Service Corps (RAASC) officer, on 14 November 1966.

== Base development ==
=== Engineer support ===
Engineer support was provided by the 3rd Field Troop, which had been supporting 1 RAR. The sand hills that covered the Vung Tau site were some 20 metres high and had to be levelled. Priority was accorded to hygiene facilities such as showers, latrines and food preparation areas. Certain areas were then covered in gravel sourced from nearby quarries and moved by the tip trucks of 87 Transport Platoon. Australian Eucalyptus robusta trees were planted to stabilise the sand dunes. These were well-suited to the waterlogged soil at Vung Tau. A garbage contract was let to Pacific Architects and Engineers, an American firm, and a rubbish tip was established by 17 Construction Squadron.

The engineers located a fresh water source on site. This was purified and chlorinated and stored in 10,000-US-gallon (38,000 L) pillow tanks. In May, this supplied 364,000 litres in jerry cans and 379,000 litres in bulk. Units were encouraged to use non-potable water whenever possible. The electricity generating plant was also operated by 17 Construction Squadron. In November 1967, the American began Vinnell Corporation began connecting the base to the American main supply. This came from a pair of T2 tankers converted to floating generator ships, each of which supplied 4,300 kilowatts, and was delivered to Vung Tau over 13,780-volt transmission lines. The electricity supply now ran on the American 120 volts, except for some equipment that required 240 volts, and the light bulbs in the quarters had to be replaced with American Edison screw bulbs.

Elevated view of the 1st Australian Logistic Support Group (1ALSG) base in June 1966, seen from a small hill above the sandy basin in the dunes.

Aerial view in 1967

Aerial view in 1971

=== Medical support ===
Medical support was provided by 2 Field Ambulance. Like other logistical units, it had a reduced staff: 121 personnel instead of the establishment of 189. Like other logistical units, it was still expected to perform the same work. The main body of the unit arrived at Vung Tau on 25 May 1966, and within 48 hours the sappers had laid a concrete floor for marquees that housed a 25-bed ward. A second 25-bed tented ward was opened on 20 June, and by the end of the year all the wards and departments were housed in air-conditioned Kingstrand huts. The unit had only limited facilities, so major medical and surgical cases were handled by the larger and better equipped US 36th Evacuation Hospital in Vung Tau.

The Australians assumed that the US Army would provide helicopter casualty evacuation services but there was no such agreement. Eventually they prevailed on the commanding officer of the US 57th Medical Detachment (Helicopter Ambulance) to provide it. However, this unit had wide-ranging responsibilities, was over-stretched, and was based at Tan Son Nhut. After an incident in June 1966 when a wounded Australian died on the way to the 36th Evacuation Hospital after a 90-minute wait for evacuation, the 57th Medical Detachment agreed to station one of its Bell UH-1 Iroquois helicopters at Nui Dat between 07:00 and 18:00 and at the 36th Evacuation Hospital after hours. This was soon supplemented by the eight Iroquois of No. 9 Squadron RAAF that arrived in Vung Tau that month, but they were not specially trained for evacuation work, so a medic from 2 Field Ambulance would accompany aircraft on casualty evacuation missions.

In March 1967, there was an outbreak of bubonic plague among the civilian population of Vung Tau. As a result, 2 Field Ambulance had to check the health documentation of 1 ALSG personnel and provide vaccinations for those who had not been vaccinated in the previous four months. There was insufficient stock of vaccine, but some was obtained from US Navy ships in the harbour. While this was a threat, the biggest medical problem was sexually transmitted infection. During 1967, there were 2,407 cases recorded among Australian servicemen, and 1 ALSG was particularly hard hit. The proximate cause was easy access to Vung Tau and its large prostitute population, coupled with a reckless disregard for preventative measures on the part of both servicemen and civilians. The incidence declined in 1968 due to the Tet Offensive. Malaria was the next biggest health concern, with the swamp near the 1 ALSG area being a breeding ground for mosquitoes. Oil was used on the swamp and other still water to kill the larvae, and there was regular aerial and ground spraying with malathion. Long sleeves and trousers had to be worn after 19:00, and a twice-daily dosage of paludrine was taken.

== Supply activities ==
A motor vehicle is lowered by crane onto a landing craft from troopship HMAS Sydney.

Supply ships, usually the Jeparit arrived from Australia on a six weekly cycle. If she was only carrying light cargo, the ship would be moored in the inner anchorage at Vung Tau. Until the Americans added a DeLong pier to allow deep draft ships to dock in 1968, heavy items had to be unloaded at Cam Ranh Bay. Ships were unloaded at Vung Tau by an American private contractor, the Alaska barge and Transport Company. Unloading went on around the clock, with the stevedores working 12-hour shifts. An infantry platoon from 1 ATF guarded the stores to prevent pilferage.

A series of checkpoints aboard and ashore were established by 11 Movement Control Group to identify the stores and route them to the appropriate unit or depot. Damaged or unidentified cargo was taken to a tent where representatives of the unit and 11 Movement Control Group decided what to do with it. Stores destined for 1 ATF were loaded onto the AV Clive Steele, which was now under the command of 1 ALSG, and taken to Ba Ria, from whence the stores were trucked to Nui Dat. Some stores and equipment were also loaded onto the ship to be returned to Australia. The arrival and departure of 1 ATF units in Sydney, starting with the relief of the 5th Battalion, Royal Australian Regiment (5 RAR) by the 7th Battalion, Royal Australian Regiment (7 RAR) in April 1967, was also managed 11 Movement Control Group.

Daily truck convoy to Nui Dat

The base at Nui Dat was usually supplied by road. Initially, convoys had to contain at least six vehicles and be escorted a Land Rover "gun jeep" armed with an M60 machine gun or an M40 recoilless rifle. Sappers constructed a bypass around Hoa Long, a village known for anti-government sentiment. The route proved sufficiently safe to switch to a system of vehicles moving in smaller packets as they were unloaded. Each packet carried at least two recovery A-frames so no breakdowns were left by the roadside but were towed to 1 ALSG's 101 Field Workshop. An airborne forward air controller from 161 Reconnaissance Flight kept watch overhead and could call in support.

Resupply by air was also possible. Two helipads were constructed in the 1 ALSG area, one for casualty evacuation, which was by the 2nd Australian Field Ambulance, and one for resupply. Both were sealed with bitumen. The former could accommodate up to three Iroquois helicopters and the latter could handle the large Boeing CH-47 Chinook and Sikorsky CH-54 Tarhe. The US Army's 765th Transportation Battalion was based at Vung Tau Air Base and could be called upon in an emergency. During the Battle of Long Tan, 1 ATF made an urgent request for 1,000 rounds of 105 mm howitzer ammunition, which was flown to Nui Dat in a pair of US Army Chinooks.

Loading an RAASC MK3 GS International truck.

Rations were managed by 25 Supply Platoon, which was part of 5 Company RAASC. About 95 per cent of the rations consumed by 1 ATF and 1 ALSG were drawn from the US Army's 53rd General Support Depot at Vung Tau. Bread, milk and ice were drawn daily, fresh rations twice a week, and non-perishables once a week. Ten days' supply of Australian tinned foods was held by 25 Supply Platoon in case American stocks ran out. On addition, the platoon held 25,000 Australian combat rations in the form of Australian Combat Ration One Man and Combat Ration Ten Man packs that were delivered by Jeparit on a six-weekly cycle.

Petrol, oil and lubricants (POL) were handled by 8 Petroleum Platoon, another subunit of 5 Company RAASC. Bulk fuel was delivered to 8 Petroleum Platoon by American 200-US-gallon (760 L) and 5,000-US-gallon (19,000 L) tankers and stored in 50,000-litre fuel bladders that held 90 days' supply. Packaged fuel in jerricans or 44-gallon drums, of which 42 days' supply was held, was drawn directly from the 53rd General Support Depot. Only petrol and diesel was stocked; Australian aviation units at Vung Tau drew aviation fuel and JP4 from American sources at Vung Tau Air Base.

Ammunition supply was the responsibility of 15 Ordnance Ammunition Platoon, a subunit of 1 ALSG's 2nd Advance Ordnance Depot. With a few exceptions, everything was drawn from the 53rd General Support Depot. Other ordnance stores were handled by the 2nd Advance Ordnance Depot, which normally held 90 days' maintenance stock, 90 days' buffer stock and 90 days' interim stock in case of delays in receiving items from Australia. Some items could be drawn from the 53rd General Support Depot, while others came from Australia. Transactions were recorded on punched tape and sent to Australia at the end of each week. The data centre was initially located in Melbourne but moved to Canberra in mid-1967. Demands averaged 2,100 per week in 1968. Engineer stores were handled by a detachment of 55 Engineer Workshop and Park Squadron and canteen stores by 2 Australian Field Canteen Unit.

2nd Advanced Ordnance Depot

In April 1967, the original medical unit of 1 ALSG, 2 Field Ambulance, was replaced by 8 Field Ambulance. Like its predecessor, 8 Field Ambulance had to work with a reduced staff. This was partially ameliorated in May when four Royal Australian Army Nursing Corps (RAANC) sisters joined the unit. Most of the unit's medical officers were reservists called to active duty. Medical support was expanded when the 1st Australian Field Hospital opened as a 60-bed facility at Vung Tau, taking over the hospital formerly run by 8 Field Ambulance. Medical supplies were handled by a detachment of the 1st Field Medical and Dental Equipment Depot. Stocks were held by the 2nd Advance Ordnance Depot, but about 90 per cent of the medical stores came from American sources, principally the US 32nd Medical Depot at Long Binh. In December 1967, medical supplies started arriving in sealed containers directly from the United States.

== Support of operations beyond Phuoc Tuy ==
A convoy of trucks carrying supplies, including a medical van, enters Fire Support Base Andersen.
