= HMAS Sydney (R17) =

Royal Australian Navy Majestic-class aircraft carrier

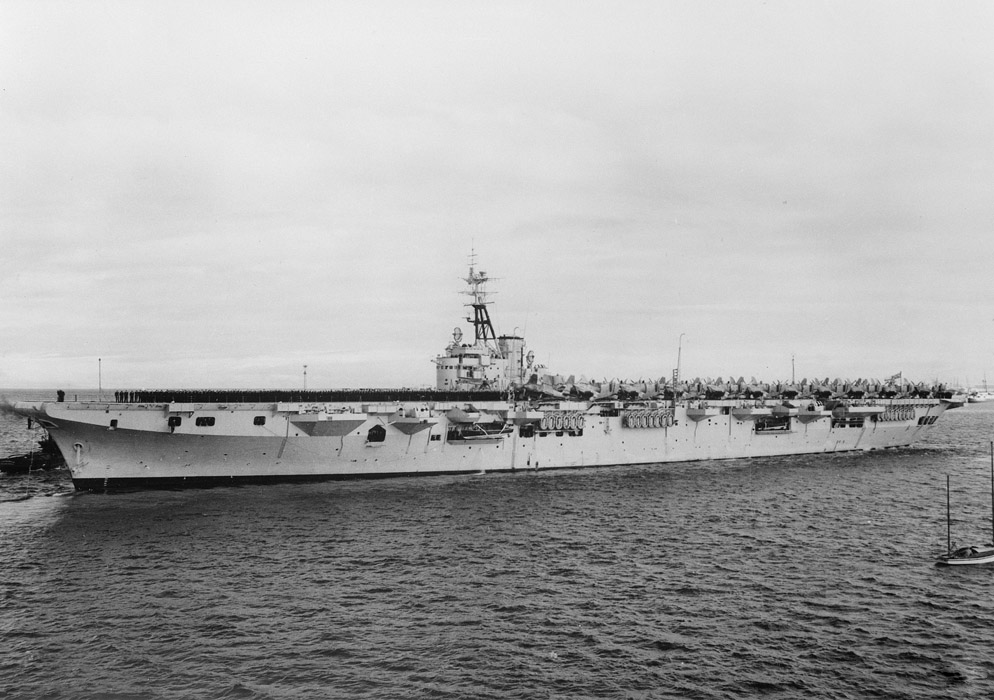
- HMAS Sydney arriving in Port Melbourne in 1949

History

Australian Navy
- Namesake: City of Sydney
- Builder: HM Dockyard Devonport, England
- Laid down: 19 April 1943
- Launched: 30 September 1944
- Commissioned: 16 December 1948
- Decommissioned: 30 May 1958
- Recommissioned: 7 March 1962
- Decommissioned: 12 November 1973
- Reclassified: Training ship; (22 April 1955); Fast troop transport; (7 March 1962)
- Motto: "Thorough and Ready"
- Nickname(s): Vung Tau Ferry; (as fast troop transport)
- Honours and awards: Battle honours: Korea 1951–52; Malaysia 1964; Vietnam 1965–72; plus seven inherited honours
- Fate: Sold for scrap in 1975
- Badge

General characteristics as aircraft carrier
- Class & type: Majestic-class aircraft carrier
- Displacement: 15,740 tons (standard); 19,550 tons (deep)
- Length: 630 ft (190 m) between perpendiculars; 698 ft (213 m) overall
- Beam: 80 ft (24 m)
- Draught: 25 ft (7.6 m)
- Propulsion: 4 × Admiralty 3-drum boilers; Parsons single reduction geared turbines; 2 shafts; 40,000 shp (30,000 kW)
- Speed: 24.8 knots (45.9 km/h; 28.5 mph)
- Complement: 1,100 (peace); 1,300 (war); Both include Fleet Air Arm personnel
- Sensors & processing systems: 2 × 227Q; 1 × 293M; 1 × 960/281BQ; 1 × 961
- Armament: 30 × Bofors 40 mm guns (18 single mountings, 6 twin mountings)
- Aircraft carried: Up to 38 aircraft
- Notes: Taken from:

General characteristics as fast troop transport
- Type: Fast Troop Transport
- Displacement: 14,380 tons (standard); 19,550 tons (full load)
- Boats & landing craft carried: 6 × LCM Mark VI; (1968 onwards)
- Complement: 544 core; Increased to 1,000 when required
- Armament: 4 × Bofors 40 mm guns (4 single mountings)
- Aircraft carried: 4 × Wessex helicopters (occasionally embarked)
- Notes: Other characteristics as above; Taken from:

HMAS Sydney (R17/A214/P214/L134) was a Majestic-class light aircraft carrier operated by the Royal Australian Navy (RAN). She was built for the Royal Navy and was launched as HMS Terrible (93) in 1944, but was not completed before the end of World War II. The carrier was sold to Australia in 1947, completed, and commissioned into the RAN as Sydney in 1948.

Sydney was the first of three conventional aircraft carriers (Note: For the purpose of this article, a conventional aircraft carrier is defined as a ship designed primarily to launch and recover multiple fixed-wing aircraft from a flight deck, and operated as such. This definition does not include seaplane tender HMAS Albatross, or the Canberra-class amphibious warfare ships.) to serve in the RAN, and operated as the navy's flagship during the early part of her career. From late 1951 to early 1952, she operated off the coast of Korea during the Korean War, making her the first carrier owned by a Commonwealth Dominion, and the only carrier in the RAN, to see wartime service. Retasked as a training vessel following the 1955 arrival of her modernised sister ship, HMAS Melbourne, Sydney remained in service until 1958, when she was placed in reserve as surplus to requirements.

The need for a sealift capability saw the ship modified for service as a fast troop transport, and recommissioned in 1962. Sydney was initially used for training and a single supply run in support of Malaysia's defence policy against Indonesia, but in 1965, she sailed on the first voyage to Vũng Tàu, transporting soldiers and equipment to serve in the Vietnam War. 25 voyages to Vietnam were made between 1965 and 1972, earning the ship the nickname "Vung Tau Ferry".

Sydney was decommissioned in 1973, and was not replaced. Despite several plans to preserve all or part of the ship as a maritime museum, tourist attraction, or car park, the carrier was sold to a South Korean steel mill for scrapping in 1975.

== Design ==
Sydney was one of six Majestic-class light fleet carriers; a modified version of the Colossus-class carrier, incorporating improvements in flight deck design and habitability. These two classes of carriers were intended to be 'disposable warships': they were to be operated during World War II and scrapped at the end of hostilities or within three years of entering service. Sydney was the second ship of the class to enter service, following Canadian aircraft carrier HMCS Magnificent.

The carrier had a standard displacement of 15,740 tons, and a deep displacement of 19,550 tons. Her length was 630 feet (190 m) between perpendiculars and 698 feet (213 m) at her longest point, with a beam of 80 feet (24 m) and a draught of 25 feet (7.6 m). Sydney was fitted with four Admiralty 3-drum boilers, which provided steam to Parsons single reduction geared turbines; these supplied 40,000 shp (30,000 kW) to the two propeller shafts, and allowed the ship to reach 24.8 knots (45.9 km/h; 28.5 mph). The average size of the ship's company in peacetime was 1,100, but could be increased to 1,300 for wartime deployments. Refitting the ship to serve as a transport reduced the standard displacement to 14,380 tons and the ship's company to a core of 544, which was supplemented by trainees and personnel from the Royal Australian Navy Reserve when required.

The British Admiralty predicted that all Majestic-class carriers would require upgrades to their aircraft lifts and arrester gear in the early 1950s, to operate the faster and heavier carrier aircraft under development. Originally, the RAN wanted to upgrade Sydney to the same or similar standard as sister ship Melbourne, after the second carrier was delivered. The installation of an angled flight deck and mirror landing aid, would have allowed Sydney to operate modern jet aircraft. However, financial and manpower restrictions led to the cancellation of this program.

=== Armament, sensors, and aircraft ===
Sydney was initially armed with thirty Bofors 40 mm anti-aircraft guns: eighteen single mountings and six twin mountings. During her refit as a troop transport, the carrier's armament was reduced to four single Bofors.

The radar suite included two Type 277Q height-finding sets, one Type 293M surface search set, one Type 960/281BQ long-range air warning set, and one Type 961 air search set.

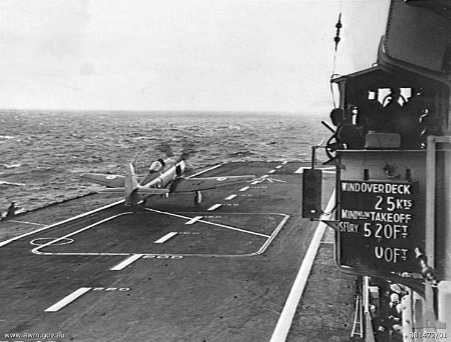
A Sea Fury preparing to take off from Sydney during her flight trials in January 1949

As an aircraft carrier, Sydney operated with the RAN Fleet Air Arm's 20th and 21st Carrier Air Groups (CAGs), which were assigned alternately to the carrier. The former was made up of 805 and 816 Squadrons, while the latter was made up of 808 and 817 Squadrons. Twenty-four aircraft, split evenly between Hawker Sea Fury fighters and Fairey Firefly attack aircraft, were normally carried. Two Supermarine Sea Otter amphibious aircraft were carried for rescue duties (but were never required for this purpose); they were not attached to any squadron, but operated as the 'Ship's Flight'. The amphibians were removed from the ship at the start of her Korean War deployment, and were replaced by a helicopter. During the carrier's Korean War deployment, 805 Squadron was added to the 21st CAG to form a 38-strong wartime air group.

While undergoing conversion into a troop transport, the ability to operate aircraft was removed from Sydney. However, on seven of the troopship's twenty-five voyages to Vietnam, she carried a flight of four Westland Wessex helicopters, sourced from either 725 or 817 Squadron, for anti-submarine surveillance.

== Construction and acquisition ==
The ship was laid down by HM Dockyard Devonport in England as HMS Terrible on 19 April 1943, with the Viscountess Astor presiding over the ceremony. She was the only aircraft carrier of the Colossus or Majestic classes to be constructed in a 'royal dockyard': a dockyard owned and operated by the Royal Navy. She was launched on 30 September 1944 by the wife of British politician Duncan Sandys. Work on the ship continued until the end of World War II, when the Admiralty ordered the suspension of all warship construction.

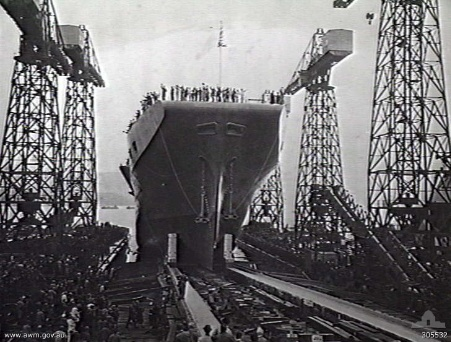
Launch of HMS Terrible, which later became HMAS Sydney

A post-war review by the Australian government's Defence Committee recommended that the RAN be restructured around a task force incorporating multiple aircraft carriers. Initial plans were for three carriers, with two active and a third in reserve at any given time, although funding cuts led to the purchase of only two carriers in June 1947; Terrible and sister ship Majestic, for the combined cost of AU£2.75 million, plus stores, fuel, and ammunition. As Terrible was fitted out as a flagship and was the closer of the two ships to completion, construction was finished without major modification. Although Terrible was due for completion on 24 June 1948, a skilled labour shortage affected the installation of the ship's boilers, causing the Admiralty to revise the delivery date to October 1948.

A commissioning crew for the aircraft carrier was raised in Australia from the ship's company of the decommissioned cruiser Hobart, which departed from Sydney aboard HMAS Kanimbla in June 1948. Ex-Royal Navy sailors were used to fill out the carrier's complement. Terrible was handed over to the RAN on 16 December 1948, and was commissioned at noon as HMAS Sydney. One of the reasons behind the choice in name was so AU£426,000 raised by the HMAS Sydney Replacement Fund after the loss of the light cruiser HMAS Sydney in 1941 could be accessed. Sydney was the last vessel to be commissioned into the RAN as 'His' Majesty's Australian Ship: as after the death of King George VI on 6 February 1952 and the coronation of Queen Elizabeth II, all RAN ships became 'Her' Majesty's.

== Operational history ==
=== 1949–1951 ===
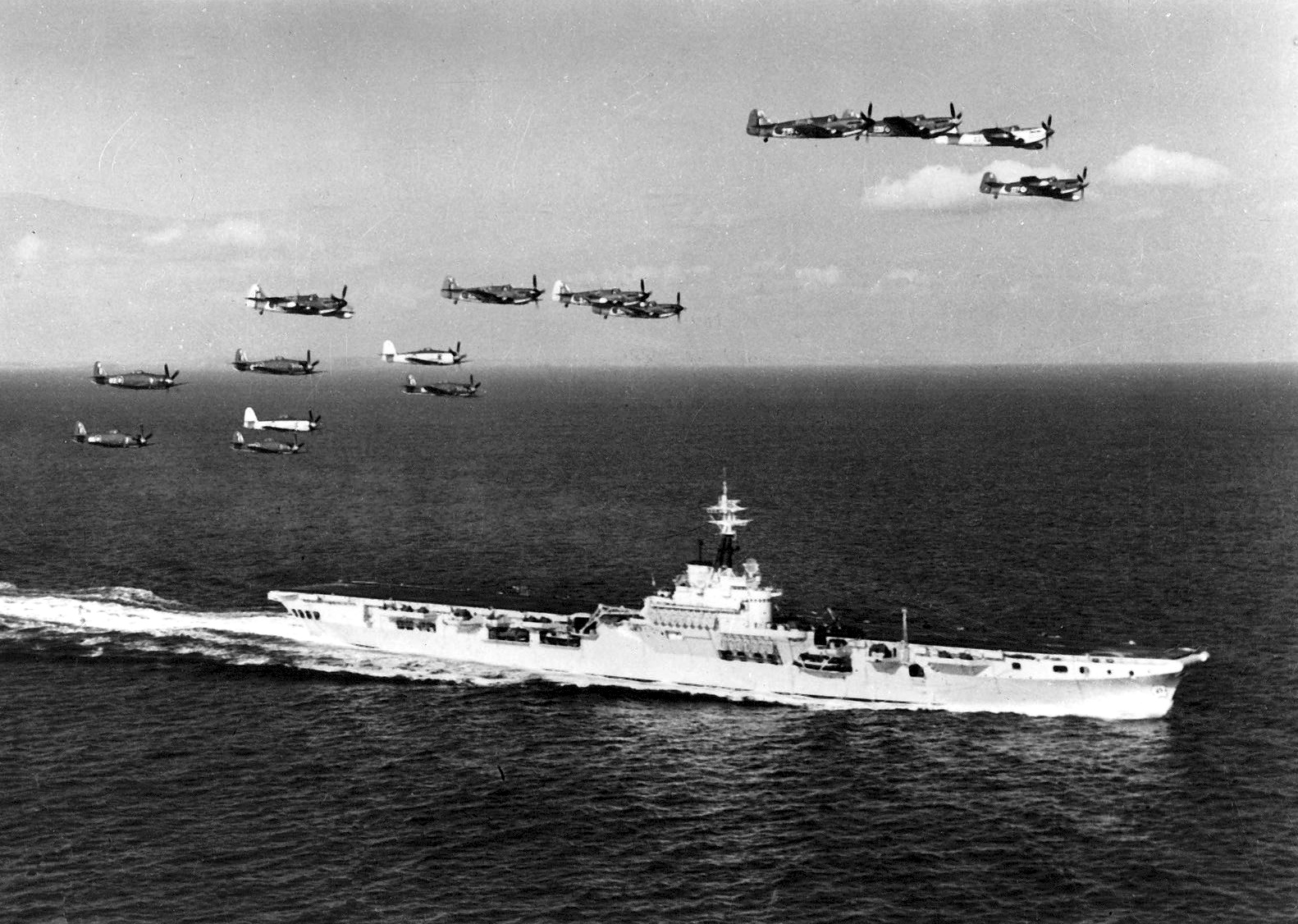
Fireflies and Sea Furies overfly Sydney

Although commissioned in mid-December 1948, Sydney did not enter service until 5 February 1949, as work was still being completed. On 25 December 1948, while still fitting out in Devonport, a helicopter from USS Columbus carrying Santa Claus became the first aircraft to land on Sydney's flight deck. The ship's sea trials and post-commissioning workup were not without event: in early December 1948, a 771 Naval Air Squadron de Havilland Mosquito crashed while helping Sydney calibrate her radar suite, killing both British aircrew, and a RAN pilot undergoing landing qualifications aboard HMS Illustrious on 17 March 1949 crashed while attempting to land: none were killed, but the pilot's Fairey Firefly and four others in the deck park were destroyed.

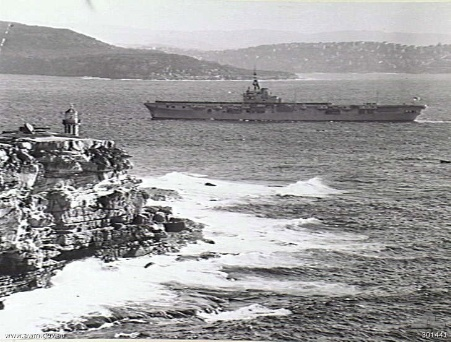
Sydney passing through the Sydney Heads for the first time on 28 May 1949

The carrier sailed from Devonport on 12 April 1949, carrying the 20th CAG. Sydney arrived at Jervis Bay on 25 May, where the aircraft of the 20th CAG and training equipment were offloaded for transport to the new naval air station, HMAS Albatross, before the carrier proceeded to her namesake city. Sydney arrived in Sydney on 2 June, and took over as Flagship of the Australian Fleet from HMAS Australia on 25 August. 20th CAG was reembarked during August, and Sydney exercised in Australian and New Guinea waters until late November. From January to April 1950, the carrier continued training exercises and visited ports in south-east Australia and New Zealand, and on 7 June, she departed for England to collect the 21st CAG. The 21st CAG embarked in October, and the carrier returned to Australia in December. Before Sydney departed in late October, the British Admiralty suggested that she be deployed to the Korean War as relief for HMS Theseus and her worn-out catapult, but this was withdrawn because of the plan's drawbacks.

On 29 January 1951, Sydney was part of an eighteen-ship fleet present in Sydney Harbour to celebrate the 50th anniversary of Australia's Federation. Following this, the carrier joined a multinational training exercise in south-east Australian waters, then visited Hobart for the Royal Hobart Regatta. During the exercise, a Sea Fury accidentally fired four practice rockets into the superstructure of the New Zealand flagship, HMNZS Bellona: although an inquiry concluded that the pilot had unintentionally pressed the fire button, it was later found that certain signal frequencies transmitted by Sydney's radio aerials could trigger a Fury's firing circuits. Sydney was presented with the Gloucester Cup in April 1951, recognising her as the most efficient ship in the RAN for 1950. The two CAGs were switched over in April, and on 3 May, a Sea Fury crashed during a rocket-assisted take off; the pilot became the carrier's first fatality.

=== Korean War (1951–1952) ===
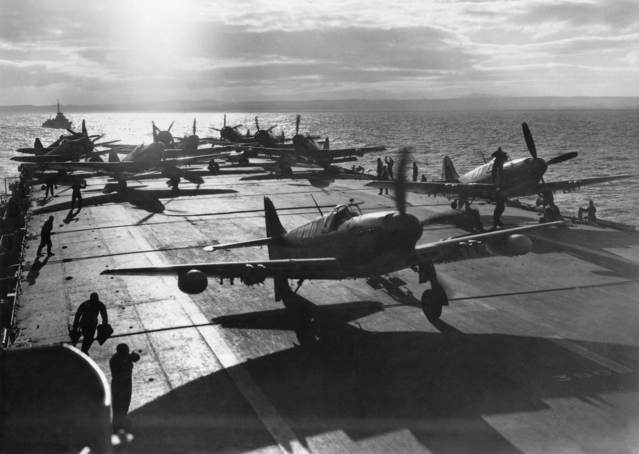
Firefly aircraft on board HMAS Sydney during her Korean War deployment

In March 1951, the First Sea Lord requested that Sydney be deployed to Korea while HMS Glory was refitted in Australia, to maintain a Commonwealth carrier presence. This was agreed to, and a 38-strong wartime CAG was formed on 14 May by incorporating the Sea Furies of 805 Squadron into the 21st CAG. Because RAN Fireflies were optimised for anti-submarine warfare, and consequently not fitted with cannon, cannon-equipped RN aircraft were loaned for the duration of Sydney's deployment. After completing pre-departure exercises, during which several aircraft were destroyed in non-fatal, weather-induced deck crashes, Sydney and the destroyer HMAS Tobruk sailed for Korea on 31 August. While en route, the carrier's aircraft were used for a fly-past demonstration over Rabaul on 6 September, following civil unrest. On her arrival, Sydney became the first aircraft carrier owned by a Commonwealth dominion to see wartime service. (Note: Two aircraft carriers (HM Ships Puncher and Nabob) were crewed by Canadians during World War II. However, these were commissioned into the Royal Navy, which had in turn received them on loan from the United States Navy as part of the Lend-Lease program.)

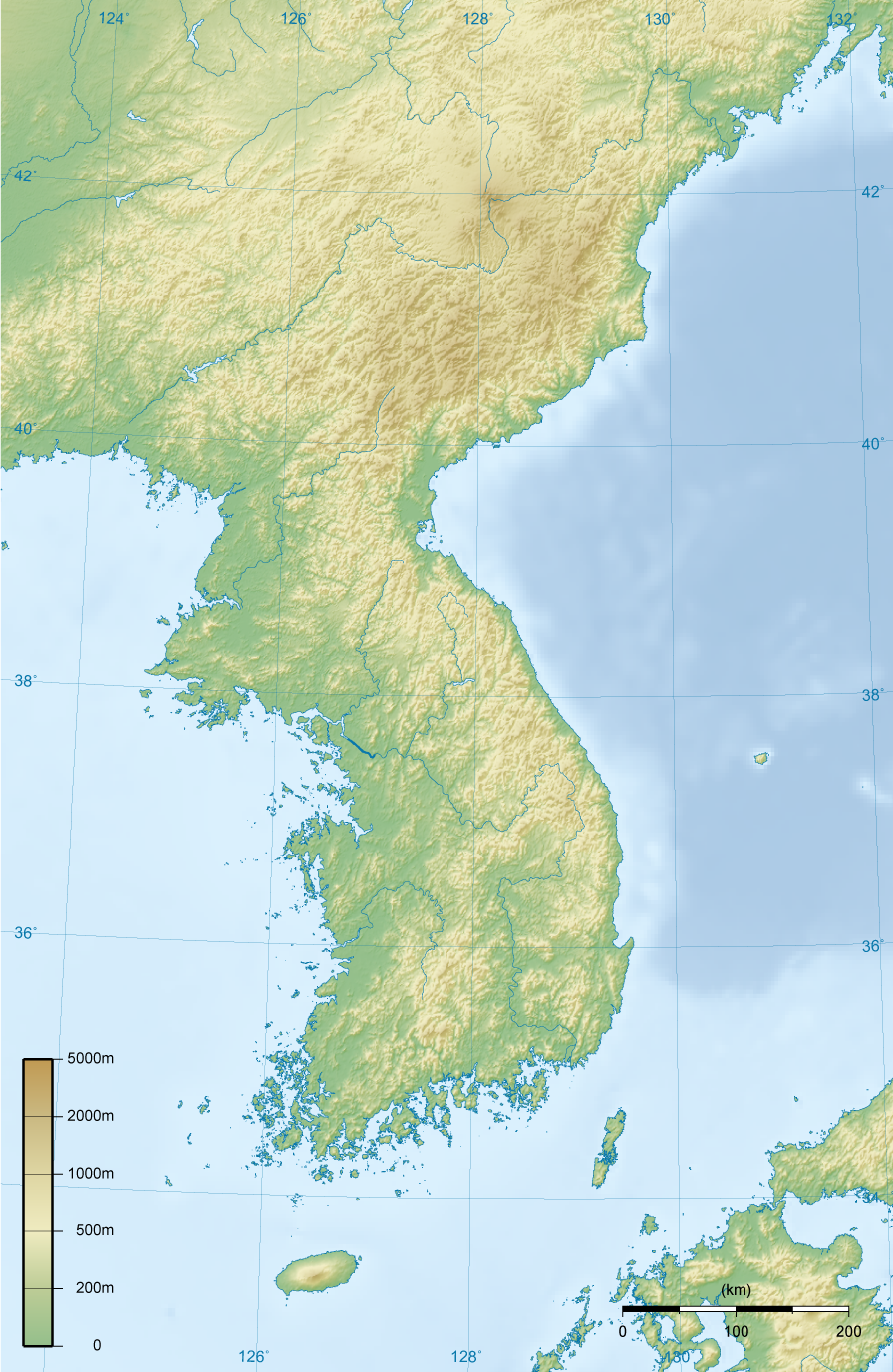
A map of the Korean Peninsula. Sydney operated primarily off the west coast, although she was deployed to the east coast on occasion.

Sydney was attached to the United States Navy (USN) Seventh Fleet and assigned to Task Element 95.11, which operated primarily off the western coast of Korea. The carrier was sent on nine or ten-day patrols in the operational area, with nine-day replenishment periods in Sasebo, Nagasaki or Kure, Hiroshima between each; to maintain coverage, Sydney alternated with a USN carrier (initially USS Rendova, then from December with USS Badoeng Strait). RAN aircraft were mainly used for air strikes against North Korean units and supply lines; secondary duties including reconnaissance, bombardment spotting, combat air patrols, and anti-submarine patrols. During her deployment, the carrier operated an unarmed USN Sikorsky Dragonfly (designation UP28, which acquired the nickname "Uncle Peter") in the search-and-rescue and plane guard roles. This was the first helicopter to operate from an Australian warship, and the first USN equipment used by the RAN. The success of helicopter operations convinced the RAN to acquire three Bristol Sycamores; the first helicopter squadron in Australian military service. Sydney's first patrol commenced on 4 October, with two days spent providing air support of efforts to push the front line away from the Han River. Sydney was then briefly repositioned off the east coast, where her aircraft flew strike missions near Wonsan. After returning to the east coast, Sydney set a record on 11 October for light carrier operations: her aircraft flew 89 sorties during the day, with 31 aircraft aloft at one point. Following her first patrol, the carrier sailed to Sasebo to resupply, but on 14 October, all ships were ordered to sea to avoid Typhoon Ruth. Although the order to clear the anchorage was given that morning, the number of ships present meant Sydney did not leave until late in the day, and sailed during the worst part of the storm. A Firefly, a 16-foot (4.9 m) motor dinghy, and a forklift were lost overboard, six other aircraft parked on the deck were destroyed, and the carrier experienced extreme winds—the wind recorder broke after registering 68 knots (126 km/h; 78 mph).

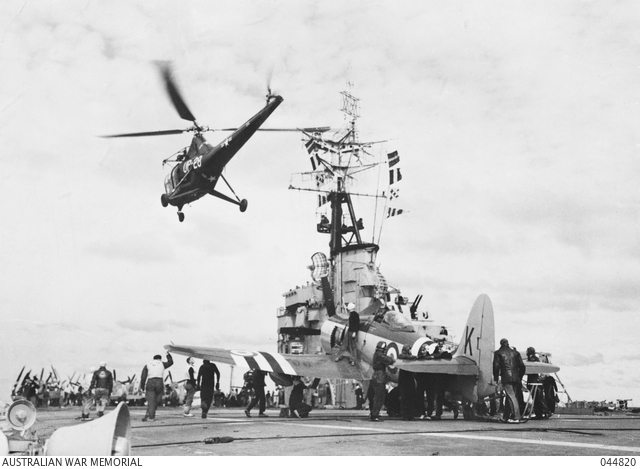
UP-28 ("Uncle Peter"), the Sikorsky Dragonfly assigned to Sydney, hovering above the carrier's flight deck

Sydney's second patrol began on 18 October, with her aircraft involved in strikes against North Korean units, coastal shipping, railway bridges, and other supply routes. They also performed their first close air support mission on 21 October, providing cover for the 1st Commonwealth Division. Two Sea Furies were shot down on 25 October; both pilots escaped unharmed. The next day, during a moderately successful strike involving five RAN aircraft against a railway tunnel, a Firefly was shot down 75 miles (121 km) inland, deep inside North Korean territory. There were doubts that a rescue helicopter could reach the crash site and return safely, as it was at the extreme limit of helicopter range and some of the return flight would occur after dark. Despite this, Uncle Peter's USN aircrew volunteered to try, and after the observer was quickly taught how to use an Owen submachine gun, the helicopter launched at 16:22. The four RAN aircraft provided cover for the two downed personnel until they were ordered to return to the carrier; two of the Fireflies met Uncle Peter at 17:15, and turned around to escort the helicopter. At 17:33 Uncle Peter arrived at the crash site and collected the RAN aircrew, with covering fire provided by the escorting Fireflies and the helicopter's observer. All three aircraft were at extreme fuel limits on their return: the two Fireflies barely made it back to Sydney, while Uncle Peter arrived at Kimpo air base at 18:30 and had to land with the aid of truck headlights. The rescue was the longest helicopter rescue transit over North Korean territory during the war, and Sikorsky pilot received both the British Distinguished Service Medal and the United States Navy Cross: the only instance of these two medals being awarded to the same person for the same action. Sydney was relieved by USS Rendova on 27 October and returned to Kure.

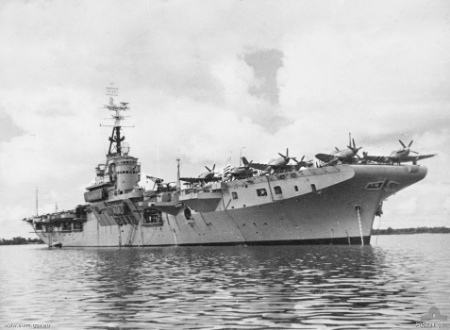
Sydney at anchor in Korean waters during 1951

Sydney began her third patrol on 5 November, operating on the west coast of Korea and escorted by the Canadian destroyers Athabaskan, Cayuga and Sioux, and American destroyers Hanna and Collett. On the same day, the first RAN casualty of the war occurred, when a Sea Fury pilot failed to pull up from a strafing run and crashed. Despite foul weather, the carrier's aircraft continued to attack lines of supply and communication, and provide support to United Nations ships: the 1000th combat sortie was flown on 12 November, a day before the patrol's end. On 18 November, after replenishing in Sasebo, Sydney, Tobruk, and the British light cruiser HMS Belfast sailed to Hŭngnam, where they joined Task Force 95.8 to aid a USN bombardment of Hŭngnam during 20–22 November. On that day, Sydney was being refuelled by RFA Wave Chief when there was an accident that resulted in a large spill of fuel and damage to Wave Chief's refuelling rig. Aircraft from Sydney performed strikes against coastal artillery batteries, barracks, industrial areas and railway lines, and provided a combat air patrol for the ships. At the conclusion of the operation, Sydney returned to the west coast, but was unable to resume operations because of snow and high winds until 27 November, a day before being relieved.

In December, UN Command temporarily switched some of the responsibilities of Task Element 95.11 and the US Fifth Air Force. Consequently, Sydney was required to provide air support for convoys between Japan and Korea amongst the other duties of her fifth patrol, which commenced on 7 December. On 8 December, a second RAN pilot was killed; although he successfully bailed out of his flak-damaged Sea Fury, he was struck by the tail of the aircraft and died from wounds. Four other aircraft were damaged that day. Clear weather, which lasted until 14 December, allowed the carrier to maintain a high rate of attack against North Korean troop concentrations, railways, and coastal vessels, while providing air cover for the Task Element. Ending on 18 December, the fifth patrol was the most costly to Sydney's CAG, with one pilot killed, five aircraft destroyed, and another 25 aircraft heavily damaged. The carrier was in Kure for Christmas, and relieved USS Badoeng Strait on 27 December, the start of her sixth patrol. The remaining days of 1951 were spent providing air cover in the Inchon area for both UN ground forces and supply convoys returning to Japan. On New Year's Day 1952, Sydney's aircraft helped repel the North Korean invasion of the island of Yongho Do. The third RAN pilot to be lost in Korea died on 2 January while performing a combat air patrol around the carrier; personnel on the flight deck saw the aircraft fly into a cloud, but not emerge. No wreckage was found, and it was assumed that the plane dived into the Yellow Sea. For most of the patrol, RAN aircraft attacked artillery emplacements and concentrations of junks in the Cho Do-Sok To area, while also proving air support for South Korean Army and irregular forces.

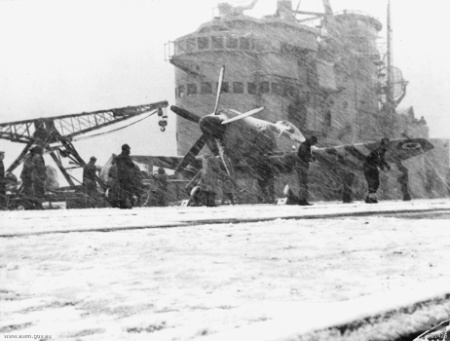
Deck crew working on a Sea Fury during a snow storm

Sydney's seventh and final patrol commenced on 16 January, with HMAS Tobruk, HMCS Sioux, USS Hanson and USS Radford accompanying. This patrol was marked by minimal flying activity due to extremely poor weather and a lack of co-ordination between UN forces and the convoys RAN aircraft were meant to escort. The primary targets for strike missions were changed from North Korean supply line infrastructure to water towers, as they took longer to repair. On the final day of the patrol, aircraft from Sydney did not fly at all, as overnight weather conditions had rendered all of the deck-parked aircraft unusable, including five which were completely encased in frozen sea water. On 25 January, Sydney was relieved by HMS Glory, and sailed for home.

Sydney completed seven patrols during her 122-day Korean deployment: flying operations were conducted for 42.8 days, poor weather stopped operations for 11.7 days, transits to and from the operational area or between assignments consumed 29.5 days, and 38 days were spent in harbour. During this time, RAN Sea Furies flew 1,623 sorties, while the Fireflies flew 743, with the aircraft using 802 bombs, 6,359 rockets, and 269,249 rounds of 20-millimetre (0.79 in) ammunition between them. Three RAN pilots were killed and a fourth seriously wounded, while thirteen aircraft were lost: nine shot down by North Korean flak artillery (which damaged aircraft on over ninety other occasions), and four to deck accidents or foul weather. Replacement aircraft were loaned from British Far East reserve supplies.

RAN aircraft damaged or destroyed an estimated 66 bridges, 141 pieces of rolling stock, over 2,000 structures, 469 watercraft, and 15 artillery pieces, while causing over 3,100 North Korean casualties. Australian damage assessment practice was considered to be conservative, and claims of great underestimation by the RAN were made by US personnel inspecting the aftermath of RAN attacks. Personnel from Sydney and her CAG received four Distinguished Service Crosses (one with Bar), one Distinguished Service Medal, ten Mentions in Despatches, and two United States Legions of Merit. Most of the personnel aboard would have been eligible for the Australian Active Service Medal, the Korea Medal, the United Nations Service Medal for Korea, and the Returned From Active Service Badge, while Sydney herself was awarded the battle honour "Korea 1951–52". The carrier's presence in Korea allowed the Australian government to avoid deploying additional Australian soldiers.

=== 1952–1958 ===
During her return from Korea, Sydney ferried Spitfires and Vampires between several British bases in Southeast Asia. After a brief refit, Sydney embarked the 20th CAG in June 1952, before proceeding on a round-Australia cruise. The carrier visited Manus Island, was present off the coast of the Montebello Islands for the first British atomic bomb test, Operation Hurricane, on 3 October, and arrived back in her namesake city in November. On 25 March 1953, Sydney departed for England with representatives from each of the three branches of the Australian and New Zealand militaries for the coronation of Queen Elizabeth II. The carrier and her aircraft participated in the Coronation Fleet Review on 15 June, and visited Canada, the United States, the Caribbean, Panama, Hawaii, and New Zealand on the return voyage, before reaching Sydney on 15 August. The carrier's 10,000th deck landing occurred during this voyage: a Firefly completed the landing on 17 July, while Sydney was en route to Pearl Harbor.

Sydney left Fremantle on 27 October 1953 for a second deployment to Korea, to support United Nations enforcement of the July 1953 armistice. This deployment, which concluded in January 1954, was mostly uneventful compared to the first, with flight operations limited to patrols along the demilitarised zone established by the armistice. During operations in Korea, one pilot died when his Sea Fury crashed into the ocean, while another pilot was killed and an aircraft handler seriously injured in separate deck accidents. Sydney returned to Fremantle on 2 June 1954. A planned upgrade of Sydney to a similar standard as modified sister ship Melbourne was cancelled in 1954, and she was prepared for service as a training ship. The carrier's embarked aircraft were flown off for the last time on 22 April 1955, and Sydney underwent a brief reorganisation during 26–29 April. Not long after, she departed for New Zealand waters on her first training cruise on 2 May. This was followed by a refit and then a quick trip from Sydney to Adelaide, thence Melbourne, and back to her home port in Sydney. A visit by Earl Mountbatten of Burma was a highlight at this time – especially when, after his presentation to the ship's company, they were all granted a 'make and mend.'

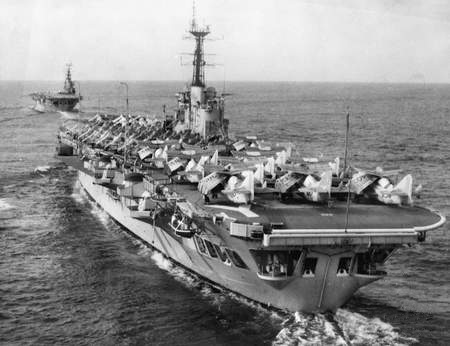
Sydney (background) escorting Melbourne (foreground) during the final leg of the latter's delivery voyage

On 1 May 1956, Sydney met Melbourne off Kangaroo Island during the latter's delivery voyage. The two carriers sailed together for the remainder of Melbourne's delivery voyage, visiting Melbourne and Jervis Bay before arriving in Sydney on 10 May. Three days later, the flagship role was transferred from Sydney to Melbourne. After this, Sydney continued on a program of training cruises throughout Australian and New Zealand waters, and visited the Far East Strategic Reserve to participate in a South East Asia Treaty Organisation multi-fleet exercise during September and October 1956. Following an appraisal process by the RAN, during which Sydney's potential usefulness as a commando carrier, aircraft transport, or troopship was considered, the ship was paid off into Special Reserve on 30 May 1958 as surplus to requirements. Sydney could be reactivated for use as a transport, but required at least four months notice.

=== Fast Troop Transport (1958–1965) conversion ===
From 1958 to 1960, opinion within the Australian military swung between reactivating Sydney as a fast troop transport ship and disposing of her. The Australian Army saw the need for such a vessel, particularly if war broke out in Southeast Asia: Australian forces would need to be rapidly deployed to the conflict, and sealift was the only way to effectively move the required number of personnel, equipment, and vehicles. However, the RAN did not want the cost of converting and maintaining Sydney coming from their share of the defence budget, as they felt there was no further use for her. As both strategic airlift and sealift with other naval or civilian vessels were unfeasible, Sydney was reactivated and converted into a fast troop transport ship during 1961 and 1962. All of her aircraft operating equipment was removed, her hangar was converted into accommodation and storage, and her armament was reduced to four single-mounted 40 mm Bofors. Sydney was recommissioned as a Fast Troop Transport on 7 March 1962, given the pennant number A214, and assigned back to the training squadron. From April 1962 onwards, Sydney was used to train the ship's company and Army personnel for the troop transport role, while supplementing the RAN's regular training needs. The troopship first saw full use in her new role in August 1963, when she was used to support an amphibious landing at Hervey Bay, Queensland during Exercise Carbine.

==== Whitsunday tragedy ====
From 27 September to 4 October, Sydney conveyed the Governor-General of Australia, Viscount De L'Isle, on a tour of Norfolk and Lord Howe Islands. The ship then departed on a training cruise to northern Queensland, during which five personnel drowned in the Whitsunday Islands. Over several days, groups of trainee officers and sailors had been ordered to take one of the ship's whaleboats on a twelve-hour voyage around Hayman and Hooke Islands; out of the sight of both the carrier and her escort, the destroyer HMAS Anzac. The third group boat left Sydney at around 0500 hours on 17 October with a midshipman and four trainee sailors aboard, and was believed to have capsized four to five hours later. Despite poor weather, Sydney's captain had declined an offer by Anzac's captain for the destroyer to move to the north of Hayman Island in case of incident, and a search party was not sent until after the boat failed to return at 1900 hours. A Board of Inquiry was held aboard Sydney, which resulted in the ship's captain, executive officer, and training officer facing courts-martial. The latter two were acquitted, and although the captain was found guilty on one of the charges brought against him, it was dropped on a technicality relating to the wording of the charge.

=== First overseas deployment as a transport ===
Sydney's first overseas deployment as a transport was to Southeast Asia in 1964. In late May, the ship was loaded with supplies and munitions for Malaysian forces in support of the country's defence policy against Indonesia. In total, 1,245 personnel were also embarked: engineers from the 7th Field Squadron, the Royal Australian Artillery's 111th Light Anti-aircraft Battery, and four UH-1 Iroquois helicopters plus associated air- and ground crew from No. 5 Squadron RAAF. Sydney departed Garden Island just after midnight on 24 May. After entering New Guinea waters, the ship was put on high alert; radio and radar silence was enforced, while the anti-aircraft guns of the 111th Battery were secured to the ship's deck to supplement her armament. Sydney met the destroyer escorts Yarra and Parramatta off the Philippines on 3 June, and a day later, the ships arrived at Kota Kinabalu, where the 7th Field Squadron was offloaded with the aid of the Australian Army landing ships Vernon Sturdee and Clive Steele. Sydney and her companions left for Singapore at midnight on 5 June, and arrived three days later to offload 250 tonnes of ammunition. Sydney and Parramatta then proceeded to Penang, where the 111th Battery, No. 5 Squadron, defence stores, and more munitions were offloaded during 16–17 June. The return voyage to Australia was interrupted on the morning of 23 June by the detection of a suspected Indonesian submarine: the two Australian ships performed evasion tactics for eighteen hours before resuming the voyage to Fremantle. No awards were issued to Sydney for operating in support of Malaysia during her service life, but a reorganisation of RAN battle honours published in March 2010 saw the battle honour "Malaysia 1964" retroactively awarded to the ship.

=== Vietnam War (1965–1972) ===
The main feature of the second half of Sydney's career was the twenty-five voyages the ship made to South Vietnam in support of the 1st Australian Task Force between May 1965 and November 1972. (Note: Other sources give a smaller number of voyages to Vietnam by Sydney. The 25-voyage figure and the associated dates are taken from Section s5B(2)(c) of the Veterans Entitlement Act. The smaller figures come from treating the fifth and sixth visits to Vũng Tàu as a single voyage because Sydney did not return to Australia in between, not including the twenty-fifth voyage because it was not directly part of Australia's war effort, or discounting the nineteenth and twenty-fifth voyages because Sydney did not carry Australian troops or equipment.) Sydney, along with the civilian vessels Jeparit and Boonaroo, was used to transport the majority of the Australian personnel and equipment contributed to the Vietnam War effort. These voyages earned Sydney the nickname "Vung Tau Ferry". The visits to Vietnam were interspersed by other duties, and Sydney continued to function as a training ship, with up to 30 midshipmen and 200 trainee sailors aboard at any given time.

A map of Vietnam, showing its location in Southeast Asia. The port of Vũng Tàu (marked) was Sydney's destination for all twenty-five voyages to Vietnam.

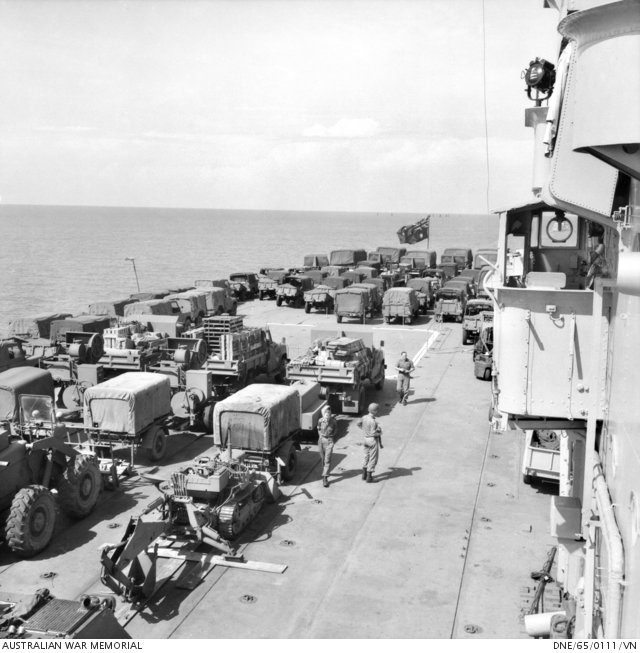
Vehicles on flight deck during first voyage to South Vietnam in June 1965

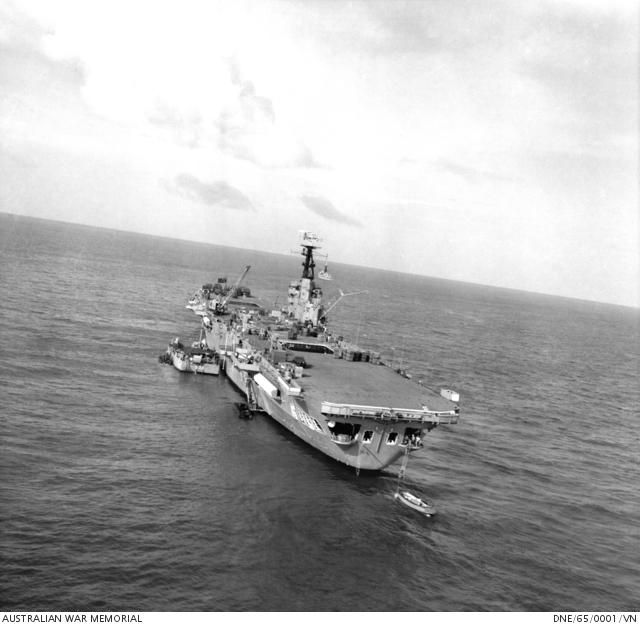
Sydney offloading at Vung Tau in June 1965

Sydney normally transported 450 soldiers—the main force of a Royal Australian Regiment (RAR) battalion—plus equipment and vehicles on each voyage. The soldiers were accommodated in the sailors mess decks, with the sailors displaced to the hangar. Vehicles were secured to the flight deck, while other cargo was packed onto pallets and stored either in the hangar or on the flight deck. Although it was originally intended that Sydney would sail to and from Saigon, the ship's commanding officer at the time of the first voyage, John Crabb, informed the Naval Board that he would refuse orders to do so, as the Saigon River could easily be mined after Sydney had sailed up. Instead, the port of Vũng Tàu was selected as the destination, with soldiers and equipment transferred to shore by helicopters, landing craft, and barges. During the early voyages, unloading and reloading was a multiple-day process, with the transport moving to deeper waters each night, but improved cargo handling practices, upgrades to Sydney (including the installation of three new cargo cranes and six embarked landing craft during mid-1968 refit), and increased access to US cargo- and troop-carrying helicopters, reduced this to a single day by 1968.

Because of the perceived threat from Chinese submarines while in transit and from Viet Cong swimmers with limpet mines while in harbour, Sydney was always escorted by at least one other RAN vessel. While in harbour, boats from Sydney and her escort would patrol around the troopship, while divers regularly inspected the hull, propellers, and anchor chain for explosives. On seven voyages, Sydney carried four Westland Wessex helicopters for anti-submarine surveillance, sourced from 725 or 817 Squadron.

During May 1965, Sydney was undergoing a refit at Garden Island, when she was ordered to prepare the ship for her first voyage to Vietnam. The refit was hastily completed, and cargo loading started on 23 May. A blanket media ban concerning the ship was issued, and soldiers of 1st Battalion, Royal Australian Regiment (1 RAR) and the Prince of Wales's Light Horse armoured regiment, along with a logistics unit and a group of journalists were covertly transported to the ship on 26 May to foil any protest attempts. Sydney began her departure at 01:39; leaving Sydney Harbour with only her navigational lights lit. The troopship was in Vũng Tàu from 8 to 11 June, and returned to Fremantle on 26 June. Sydney was escorted by the destroyer Duchess for the entire voyage, and was joined by HMA Ships Parramatta, Melbourne, and Vampire for parts of the voyage. After loading troops and equipment in both Sydney and Brisbane, the troopship, accompanied by Melbourne and Anzac, started her second voyage on 14 September. Sydney was handed off to Duchess and Vendetta off Manus Island six days later. The three ships reached Vũng Tàu on 28 September, and departed two days later: after clearing the Market Time area, the two destroyers headed for Hong Kong, while Sydney proceeded to Subic Bay, then to her namesake city, where she arrived on 20 October. Despite these deployments, Sydney was later presented the Gloucester Cup for 1966; being the most efficient vessel in the RAN that year.

Sydney sailed to Vietnam for the third time on 24 April 1966, with units from both 5 RAR and 6 RAR aboard. (Note: The departure date listed in Section s5B(2)(c) of the Veterans Entitlement Act conflicts with the ship's records: the latter gives Sydney's departure date for the third voyage as 22 April.) She met her escorts, Vampire, Yarra, and Melbourne en route: the two smaller ships accompanied Sydney into Vũng Tàu from 4 to 6 May, while the aircraft carrier Melbourne left the group as soon as they reached the Vietnam operational area. Sydney and her escorts arrived in Hong Kong on 9 May, with the troopship returning to Sydney on her own on 18 May. On 25 May, Sydney departed on her fourth voyage to Vietnam, with the remaining units of 5 RAR and 6 RAR aboard, plus equipment and personnel of No. 9 Squadron RAAF. (Note: The departure date listed in Section s5B(2)(c) of the Veterans Entitlement Act conflicts with the ship's records: the latter gives Sydney's departure date for the fourth voyage as 24 May.) Carrying the remaining units of 5 RAR and 6 RAR, plus equipment and personnel of No. 9 Squadron RAAF and escorted by Yarra, Melbourne, Derwent, and Vendetta for varying sections of the voyage, Sydney arrived in Vũng Tàu on 6 June. The voyage officially ended with the arrival of Sydney and Vendetta in Hong Kong on 11 June. In November, Sydney provided assistance to the submarine USS Tiru, which ran aground on Frederick Reef.

On 1 March 1967, the ensign flown by RAN ships was changed from the British White Ensign to the Australian White Ensign. Sydney became one of only two RAN ships to undergo wartime service under both ensigns—the other being Vendetta—and the only RAN ship to fly two ensigns during the same conflict. With 7 RAR embarked, Sydney departed her namesake city on 8 April for her fifth voyage to Vietnam. With Vampire escorting and Westland Wessex helicopters aboard for the first time, the troopship spent 20 April disembarking 7 RAR in Vũng Tàu before arriving in Singapore two days later. On 28 April, the two ships left Singapore on the sixth voyage, to collect 5 RAR. The battalion was embarked on 30 April, with Sydney arriving home on 12 May. Although the fifth and six voyages are officially recorded separately, they are sometimes counted as a single trip, because Sydney did not return to Australia in between.

Sydney's seventh voyage began on 19 May from Brisbane, with 2 RAR and a company from 1st Battalion, Royal New Zealand Infantry Regiment—the first New Zealand infantry force sent to Vietnam. Sydney and the destroyer escort Stuart reached Vũng Tàu on 30 May, where the troopship's passengers were offloaded by Chinook helicopters and replaced by 6 RAR. The ships left Vietnam on the same day, and arrived in Brisbane on 14 June. The eighth voyage required Sydney to transport 3 RAR from Adelaide. Departing on 20 December, Sydney was met by Yarra en route, with the two ships arriving in Vietnam on 27 December, and returning to Fremantle on 3 January 1968.

On 17 January 1968, Sydney departed Sydney on her ninth voyage to Vietnam. Meeting Stuart off Singapore on 25 January, the two ships visited Sattahip, Thailand on 31 January before continuing on to Vietnam. Sydney arrived in Vũng Tàu on 3 February, and departed the same day for home; arriving in Sydney on 16 February. Sydney's tenth voyage began on 27 March, with 1 RAR embarked for their second Vietnam deployment, and the destroyer escort Parramatta meeting the troopship off Singapore. The battalion was delivered to Vũng Tàu on 9 April, with 7 RAR on board for the return to Australia, where they arrived on 26 April. The eleventh voyage saw Sydney, with the destroyer Anzac escorting, depart Brisbane on 21 May with 4 RAR aboard. The ships arrived at Vũng Tàu on 1 June, where the battalion was replaced by 2 RAR for the return voyage to Brisbane, which was reached on 13 June. After this voyage, Sydney underwent an extensive refit in which she was fitted with three new Favelle Favco-type cargo cranes and modified to carry six Landing Craft Mechanized (LCM (6)) on davits. 16 LCM were constructed for use with Sydney, but half were put up for sale in the early 1970s. During September and October, Sydney temporarily resumed flagship duties, and participated in the amphibious warfare exercise Coral Sands. After the exercise, the troopship undertook a training cruise to New Zealand. Sydney's twelfth voyage was to deliver 9 RAR to Vietnam. The troopship sailed from Fremantle on 13 November, and met the destroyer Duchess off Singapore on 18 November. 9 RAR was delivered to Vũng Tàu on 20 November, while 3 RAR and a damaged de Havilland Caribou were loaded for the return trip, which concluded in Fremantle on 28 November.

At the start of 1969, the RAN's ship designation and numbering system was altered from the British pennant system to a new system based on the United States' hull classifications: Sydney was assigned the pennant number P214. The troopship began her thirteenth voyage on 8 February 1969, when she sailed from Fremantle with 5 RAR aboard. Sydney and the destroyer escort Derwent arrived in Vũng Tàu on 15 February and departed the same day with 1 RAR embarked, with the troopship reaching Townsville on 25 February. A training cruise in March saw the ship visit New Zealand and Fiji. Sydney's fourteenth voyage, to deliver 6 RAR to Vietnam and return with 4 RAR, commenced on 8 May when Sydney sailed from Townsville. She met the destroyer Vampire off Singapore on 14 May, reached Vũng Tàu five days later, and arrived back in Brisbane on 30 May. On 17 November, Sydney and the destroyer Duchess departed Brisbane on the troopship's fifteenth voyage to Vietnam, with 8 RAR aboard. The ships reached Vũng Tàu on 28 November; 8 RAR was replaced by 9 RAR, which was delivered to Fremantle on 5 December.

Sydney, with 7 RAR on board, and the destroyer escort Yarra departed from Sydney for the sixteenth voyage on 16 February 1970. They arrived in Vietnam on 27 February, with Sydney embarking 5 RAR for the voyage to Fremantle, where they arrived on 5 March. On 16 April, Sydney was one of 45 vessels from 13 nations assembled in Sydney Harbour to celebrate the Australian Bicentenary, marking James Cook's discovery of the east coast of Australia. Later that month, a visit to Portland, Victoria coincided with the Bicentenary Royal Tour of Queen Elizabeth II and the Duke of Edinburgh. Sydney sailed from Fremantle on 21 October on the seventeenth voyage to Vietnam. The troopship met the destroyer Vendetta off Manila, and reached Vietnam on 31 October, where 2 RAR was offloaded and 8 RAR embarked. The two ships departed a day later, with Sydney reaching Brisbane on 12 November. At the start of February 1971, the troopship visited Hobart to serve as the flagship of the Royal Hobart Regatta, before she sailed to Adelaide, embarked 3 RAR, then departed on her eighteenth Vietnam voyage on 15 February. Sydney met the destroyer escort Yarra en route, with both ships reaching Vũng Tàu on 25 February, where 7 RAR boarded for the return voyage. On 2 March, two days before reaching Fremantle, the ashes of Rear Admiral Harold Farncomb were scattered from Sydney.

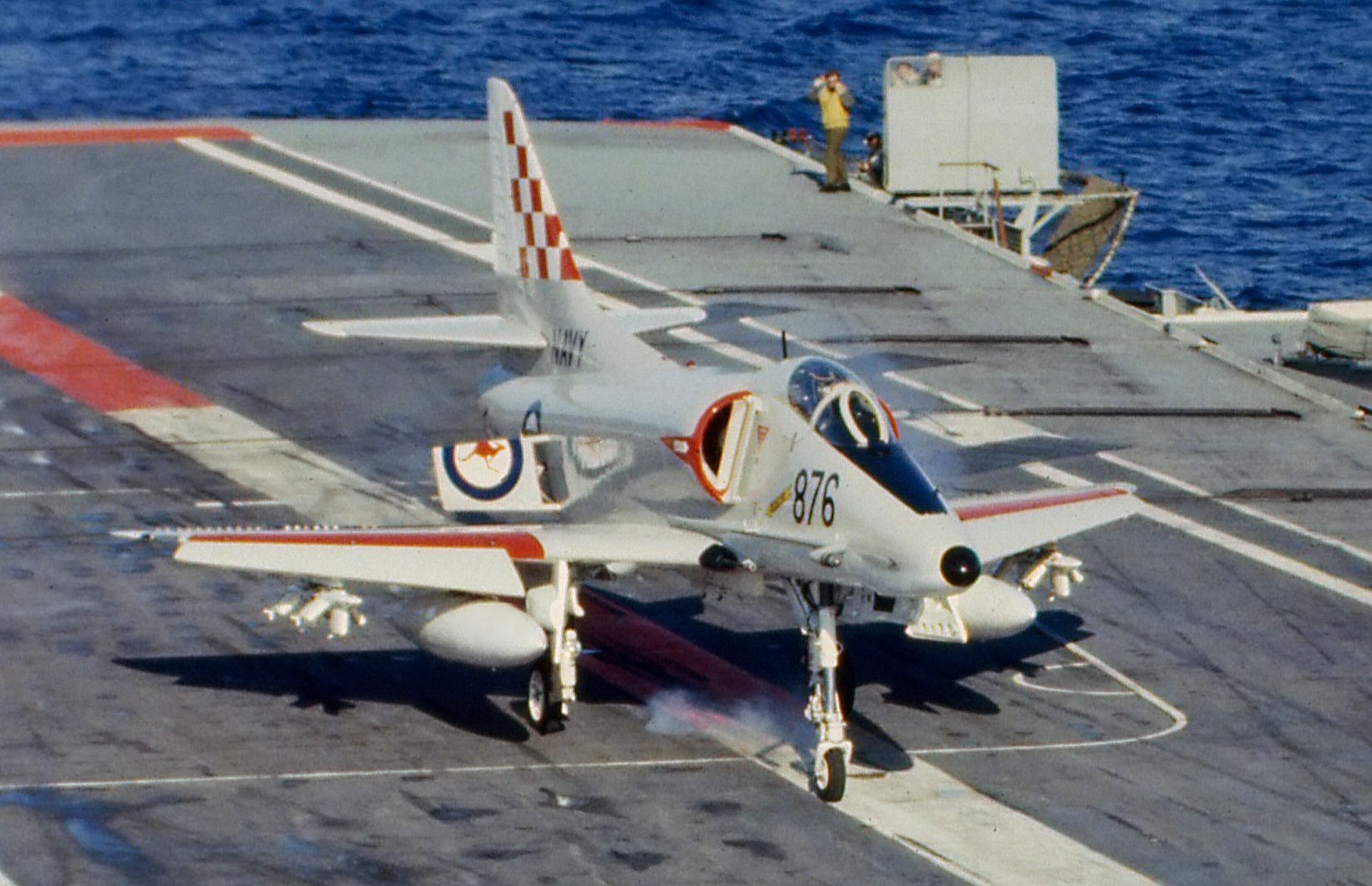
Sydney collected ten A-4G Skyhawks from the United States for use by the Fleet Air Arm in July 1971. The aircraft were never flown from Sydney, but used by sister ship Melbourne.

Sydney sailed again from Adelaide on 26 March for her nineteenth voyage, carrying general cargo and foreign aid supplies for the Khmer Republic. She met the destroyer Duchess off Singapore on 3 April, and the two ships arrived in Vũng Tàu on 5 April. The voyage officially ended when Sydney and Duchess arrived in Hong Kong on 8 April, and after a short period of recreational leave, the troopship returned to Australia. The twentieth voyage saw Sydney sail from Townsville on 13 May, with 4 RAR embarked. She met Duchess and Parramatta en route, and reached Vũng Tàu on 22 May. The ships left a day later, with 2 RAR aboard for the voyage home. Sydney arrived in Townsville on 1 June. In July 1971, Sydney sailed to Esquimalt, British Columbia, for Canada's centennial naval assembly. She then visited San Diego to collect ten new A-4G Skyhawk aircraft for the Fleet Air Arm, and delivered these to Australia in mid-August. On 20 September, Sydney departed on the twenty-first voyage to Vietnam. The troopship first sailed to Singapore, where she offloaded equipment for the ANZUK force and met the destroyer escort Swan. The two ships were in Vũng Tàu for 6–7 October, during which 3 RAR was heli-lifted to Sydney for return to Australia, with the troopship arriving in Adelaide on 16 October. Ten days later, Sydney sailed from her namesake city for her twenty-second visit to Vietnam, with a cargo of Defence Aid stores. Meeting the destroyer escort Derwent en route, Sydney arrived in Vũng Tàu on 6 November, where the stores were offloaded and replaced by Australian personnel and equipment from assorted units over a two-day period. Arriving back in Sydney, the troopship left again on 24 November for her twenty-third voyage to Vietnam. Sydney met Swan off Subic Bay, then arrived in Vũng Tàu on 8 December, where 4 RAR, the 104th Battalion of the Royal Australian Artillery, and No. 9 Squadron were embarked for the return to Australia. The ship was visited by South Vietnamese President Nguyễn Văn Thiệu before departing, who thanked the efforts of the Australian military during the Vietnam War. Sydney arrived in Townsville on 17 December.

Sydney left for her twenty-fourth voyage to Vietnam on 14 February 1972; the troopship and the destroyer escort Torrens reached Vũng Tàu on 28 February, where 457 Australian soldiers from various units boarded. They left the next day, and Sydney reached Townsville on 9 March before arriving in her namesake city three days later, concluding the military involvement of the RAN in the Vietnam War. Sydney underwent a refit between 22 May and 20 October, then departed on 1 November for her twenty-fifth journey to Vietnam, carrying defence equipment and foreign aid supplies for South Vietnam and the Khmer Republic. Sydney and the destroyer Vampire reached Vũng Tàu on 23 November, and sailed a day later with miscellaneous Australian equipment aboard. During the return voyage, Sydney encountered the disabled merchant ship Kaiwing, and towed her 450 nautical miles (830 km; 520 mi) to Hong Kong for repairs, arriving on 30 November.

During her voyages to South Vietnam, Sydney transported 16,902 soldiers, 5,753 deadweight tons of cargo, 2,375 vehicles, and 14 aircraft. Initially, personnel from Sydney, the other transport ships, and their escorts, could not claim time served on logistics or escort deployments towards the active service requirements of the Vietnam Medal, the Australian Active Service Medal, or the Returned From Active Service Badge: the Department of Defence had attempted to limit the cost of repatriation benefits by taking the stance that these ships were not eligible as they were not in combat. Following numerous campaigns to change this, the Australian government issued the Returned from Active Service Badge to all these personnel in 1986, and allowed them to receive military service pensions. Further campaigning and legal challenges resulted in the creation of the Vietnam Logistic and Support Medal in 1992, which was presented as a campaign medal to personnel who did not meet the requirements for the Vietnam Medal, but were still involved in the conflict. Similar efforts were made to have Sydney's service recognised with a battle honour: according to Nott and Payne, such a battle honour is yet to be awarded as of 2008, although a 2006 Department of Defence press release lists the honour "Vietnam 1965–72" among those awarded to the ship. The battle honour was confirmed in an updated list released in March 2010.

== Final years, decommissioning and fate ==
The ship was assigned the pennant number L134 during 1973. At the start of the year, Sydney was marked for a potential deployment to Mururoa in support of a Royal New Zealand Navy frigate sent to protest French nuclear testing at the atoll. The former carrier was chosen as she was capable of replenishing smaller vessels, and the RAN's dedicated replenishment oiler, HMAS Supply, was undergoing refits. The Australian government did not want to send a warship until all other avenues of protest had been exhausted; the length of this delay meant Supply's refit was finished before Sydney was deployed, and the oiler was sent instead. Sydney visited Singapore in March, returned to Australia, and sailed to New Zealand in April: she participated in training exercises during both visits. The troopship was then involved in a joint warfare exercise in Jervis Bay during May.

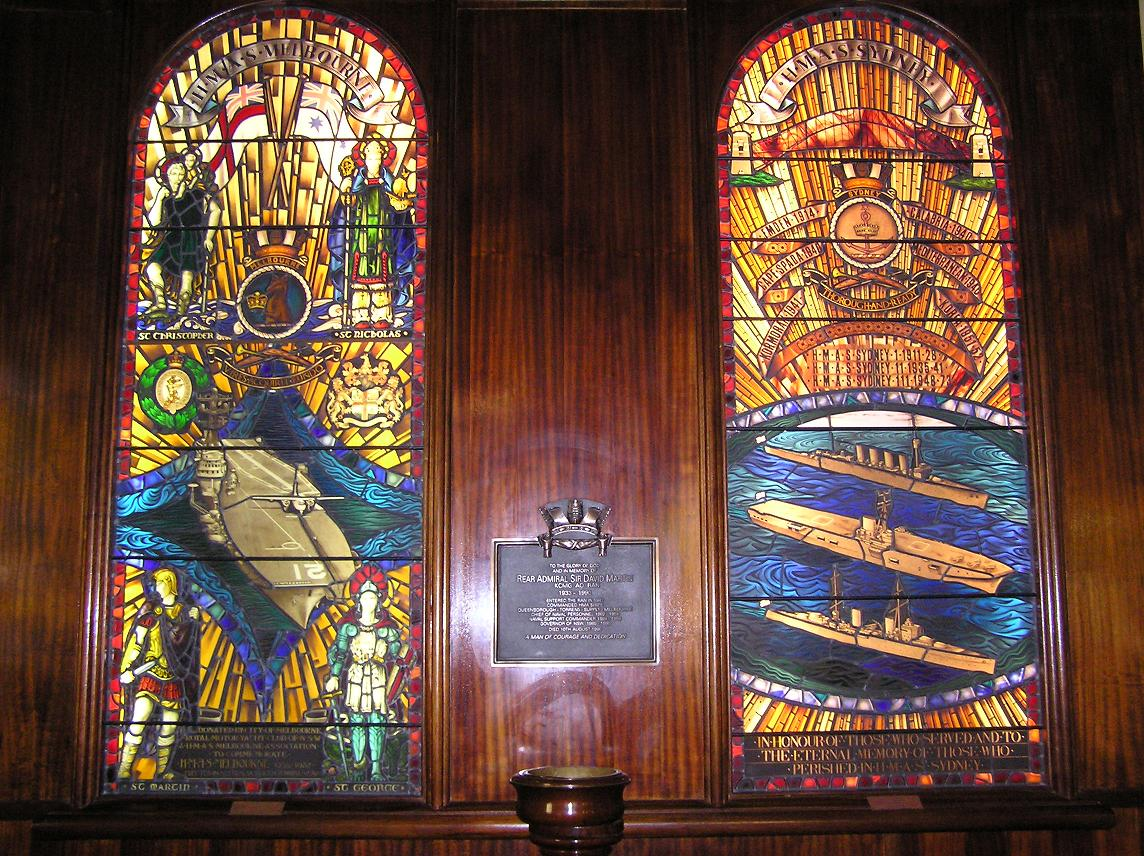
Memorial windows for the first three HMA Ships Sydney (right) and the carrier HMAS Melbourne (left)

On 20 July 1973, the Australian government decided that Sydney was to be decommissioned. A refit planned to start late in the year was cancelled, and on 12 November 1973, Sydney was paid off and marked for disposal. The ship had sailed 711,549 nautical miles (1,317,789 km; 818,836 mi) since she was first commissioned: 315,958 nautical miles (585,154 km; 363,598 mi) as an aircraft carrier, and 395,591 nautical miles (732,635 km; 455,238 mi) as a fast troop transport. Several suggestions for disposal were made by various companies and agencies. The Geelong Regional Tourist Authority wanted the ship moored in Corio Bay for use as a maritime museum, convention centre, and floating casino. The Naval History Society of Australia suggested that the island superstructure be removed and located in The Rocks as a maritime museum, while the owners of the Sydney Opera House planned to use the ship as a floating car park. Tenders closed on 7 October 1975, and the ship was sold on 30 October for breaking up as scrap metal to the Dongkuk Steel Mill in Seoul, South Korea, for A$673,516. Sydney was towed from her namesake city by a Japanese tugboat on 23 December 1975, leaving at 1300 hours.

Sydney had been originally slated for replacement in the 1960s, with rumours circulating that the new ship would either be an amphibious assault ship of the United States Iwo Jima class, or the British carrier HMS Hermes. The assault ship rumour was proven false by the early 1970s, while the acquisition of Hermes was still under discussion in the 1980s as a possible replacement for sister ship HMAS Melbourne. Following the decommissioning of Sydney, the Australian Defence Force did not possess a long-range troop transportation capability until the modified Round Table-class landing ship HMAS Tobruk was commissioned in 1981.

The ship's service, along with the previous two ships of the name, is commemorated by a stained-glass window at the Garden Island Naval Chapel. The carrier's chapel and bell were removed and installed at the naval base HMAS Moreton in 1974, then were relocated to the Australian National Maritime Museum's collection in the 1980s. One of Sydney's anchors is displayed at the Fleet Air Arm Museum at HMAS Albatross.
