= Monash =

Monash may refer to:

== Places ==
=== Australia ===
==== Australian Capital Territory ====
- Monash, Australian Capital Territory, a suburb of Canberra

==== South Australia ====
- Monash, South Australia, a town

==== Victoria ====
- City of Monash, a municipality
- Division of Monash, an Australian Electoral Division
- Monash College, Melbourne
- Monash Freeway, a road linking Melbourne to Gippsland
- Monash Medical Centre, a hospital and research centre in Melbourne
- Monash Province, an electorate of the Victorian Legislative Council until 2006
- Monash Special Developmental School, a school
- Monash University, a public research university in Melbourne

=== Israel ===
- Kfar Monash, an agricultural settlement in central Israel

== People ==
- John Monash (1865–1931), Australian World War I general
- Paul Monash (1917–2003), American producer and screenwriter

== Other uses ==
- .monash, an Internet top-level domain
- Australian Army ship John Monash (AS 3051)
