= Chauvel =

People with the surname Chauvel include:

- Charles Chauvel (filmmaker) (1897–1959), Australian filmmaker
- Charles Chauvel (politician) (born 1969), New Zealand lawyer and politician
- Elsa Chauvel (1898–1983), Australian actress and filmmaker; wife of Charles Chauvel
- Sir Harry Chauvel (1865–1945), senior officer of the Australian Imperial Force who fought in the First World War
- Louis Chauvel (born 1967), French sociologist, full professor at Sciences Po
- Patrick Chauvel (born 1949), independent war photographer

== See also ==
- Australian landing ship medium Harry Chauvel (AV 1353), United States Navy landing ship medium sold to Australia and operated by the Australian Army
- Chauvel Award, a film award
- Chauvel Cinema, a cinema in Paddington, Sydney
