= 32nd Small Ship Squadron, Royal Australian Engineers =

32nd Small Ship Squadron
- Active: 1959–1971
- Country: Australia
- Branch: Army
- Type: Royal Australian Engineers (RAE)

The 32nd Small Ship Squadron, Royal Australian Engineers was an amphibious unit of the Royal Australian Engineers. They were formed in 1959 to operate the four LSM-1 class Landing Ship Medium purchased from the United States Navy. The ships were sold in 1971 and the unit was disbanded.

== Ships of the 32nd Small Ship Squadron ==
- Harry Chauvel (AV 1353)
- Brudenell White (AV 1354)
- Vernon Sturdee (AV 1355)
- Clive Steele (AV 1356)
- John Monash (AS 3051)
- Mollymawk (AT 2383)
