= HMAS Sydney =

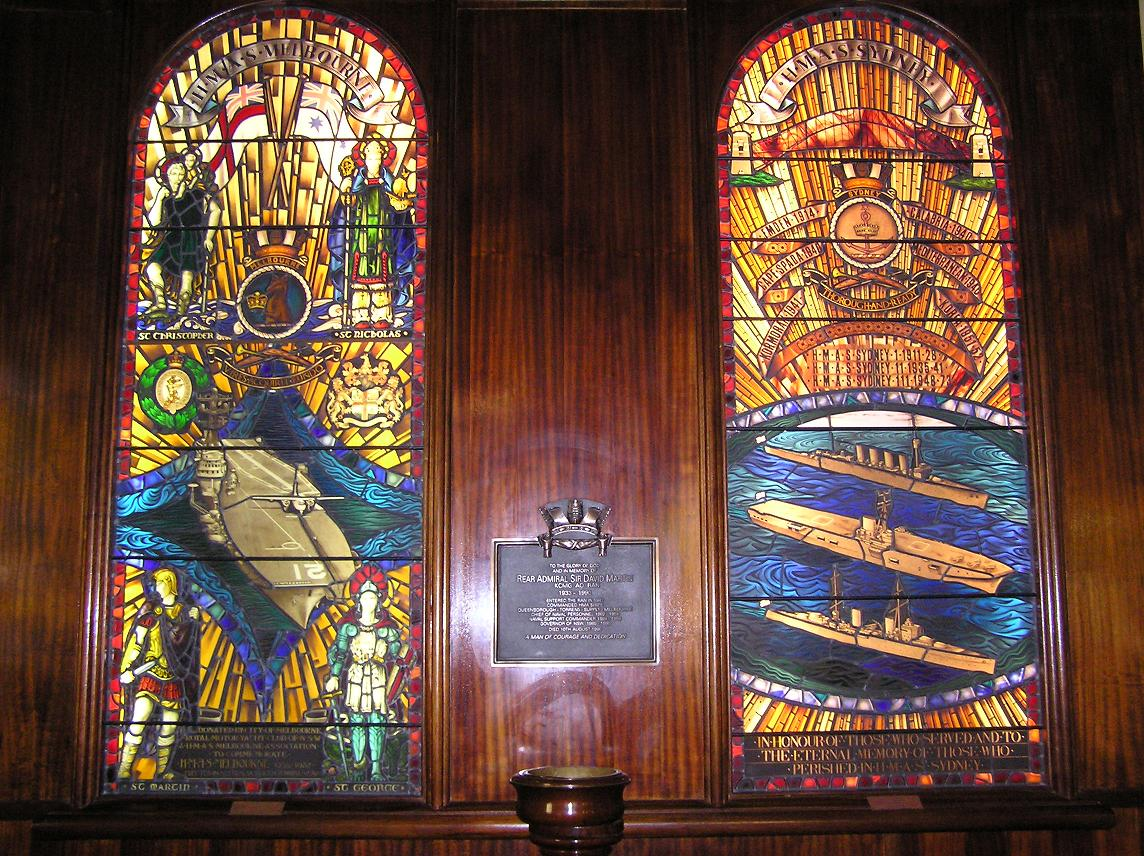
Memorial windows for the first three HMA Ships Sydney (right) and the carrier HMAS Melbourne

Five ships of the Royal Australian Navy have been named HMAS Sydney, after Sydney, the capital city of New South Wales.

- HMAS Sydney (1912), a Town-class light cruiser launched in 1912, decommissioned in 1928, and broken up for scrap
- HMAS Sydney (D48), a Leander-class light cruiser launched in 1934, and sunk following a battle with the German auxiliary cruiser Kormoran on 19 November 1941
- HMAS Sydney (R17), a Majestic-class light aircraft carrier launched in 1944, decommissioned in 1973, and broken up for scrap
- HMAS Sydney (FFG 03), an Adelaide-class guided missile frigate launched in 1980, and decommissioned in 2015
- HMAS Sydney (DDG 42), a Hobart-class air warfare destroyer in service since 2020

== Battle honours ==
Between them, vessels named HMAS Sydney have been awarded fourteen battle honours by the Royal Australian Navy. These include two of the only three battle honours awarded in the 20th century for an action involving a single opposing ship:

- Rabaul 1914
- Emden 1914
- North Sea 1916–18
- Calabria 1940
- Spada 1940
- Mediterranean 1940
- Kormoran 1941
- Korea 1951–52
- Malaysia 1964
- Vietnam 1965–72
- Kuwait 1991
- East Timor 1999
- Persian Gulf 2001–03
- Iraq 2003
