= 1st Australian Logistic Support Company =

- Bien Hoa, South Vietnam, 1965. Headquarters 1st Logistic Support Company
- Active: 1 May 1965 – 13 May 1966
- Country: Australia
- Branch: Australian Army
- Type: Logistic
- Engagements: Vietnam War

The 1st Australian Logistic Support Company (1 ALSC) was a ground support unit of the Australian Army during the Vietnam War. 1 ALSC commanded logistic support units for Australian forces in South Vietnam and was composed of engineer, transport, ordnance, medical and service corps units. The unit was formed in 1965 to support the 1st Battalion, Royal Australian Regiment at the Bien Hoa Air Base. It was absorbed into the 1st Australian Logistic Support Group in May 1966 following the formation of the 1st Australian Task Force as the Australian commitment in Vietnam expanded.

== Formation ==
On 29 April 1965, the Prime Minister of Australia, Sir Robert Menzies, announced that his government had decided to send an infantry battalion to South Vietnam. His description of the role of the battalion was necessarily vague, as this had not yet been determined. The contingent would be composed of the 1st Battalion, Royal Australian Regiment (1 RAR), 709 Signals Troop and the 1st Australian Logistic Support Company (1 ALSC), which was allotted a strength of 9 officers and 124 other ranks.

Bien Hoa, Vietnam, August 1965. Major Rod MacDonald (right) presents corporal stripes to newly promoted Corporal Alex McKean of Darra

Following the Prime Minister's announcement, the Director of Military Operations and Plans at Army Headquarters, Brigadier Kenneth Mackay flew to Saigon with a party of seven to make the arrangements. They met with the staff of the US Military Assistance Command, Vietnam (MACV) on 2 May, and agreed that 1 RAR would be attached to the US 173rd Airborne Brigade, which was en route from Okinawa. One of the brigade's battalions was tasked with guarding the Bien Hoa Air Base. A second infantry battalion was required for this, and 1 RAR could fulfil the role.

Logistical arrangements were part of the working arrangement concluded between the commander, Australian Army Force, Vietnam (AAFV), Colonel Oliver David Jackson, and the Commander, MACV, General William Westmoreland. The agreement was drawn up by Mackay and Westmoreland's chief of staff, Major General Richard G. Stilwell. This provided that "COMUSMACV will be responsible to provide all the logistical and administrative support on the same basis as that normally supplied to US forces. The provision and maintenance of items unique to AAFV will be the responsibility of COMAAFV."

On 1 May 1965, 1 ALSC was activated at Holsworthy Barracks under the command of Major Rod MacDonald. Elements of units that were to comprise it began arriving two days later, starting with the advance party of the 26th Company, Royal Australian Army Service Corps (RAASC). Other elements followed, although the company establishment was not yet finalised. A new establishment table was received on 12 May, with some elements being reduced and others being added. The additions included a troop of ten M113 armoured personnel carriers from the 4th/19th Prince of Wales's Light Horse. They were intended to carry stores rather than troops. The Army was unfamiliar with the capabilities of the M113 as the vehicles had only entered Australian service in 1964. They lacked radios but it was hoped that these could be acquired from US sources in Vietnam.

== Deployment ==
Vehicles on the flight deck of HMAS Sydney, anchored off Vũng Tàu in June 1965

The advance party of 1 ALSC departed for Vietnam by air on 25 May. The old aircraft carrier HMAS Sydney, which had been converted to a troopship, embarked elements of 1 ALSC and 1 RAR and 1 Troop, A Squadron, 4th/19th Prince of Wales's Light Horse, along with unit stores, vehicles and equipment. It departed from Sydney Harbour on 27 May 1965 and anchored off Vũng Tàu on 8 June. It was unloaded there by US and Army of the Republic of Vietnam (ARVN) landing craft. At the time the only deep-water ports in South Vietnam were at Saigon and Cam Ranh Bay, but the port of Saigon was badly congested due to the American military build up, and ships could spend up to three weeks awaiting a berth. Unloading at the anchorage allowed Sydney to unload in just three days. The vehicles and stores were moved up the Saigon River in landing craft and barges to Saigon, where they were loaded aboard US Army trucks and delivered to Bien Hoa. The vehicles arrived on 10 June followed by the stores on 12 June. Stores were pilfered, lost or damaged en route. The main bodies of 1 RAR and 1 ALSC flew to Bien Hoa in chartered Qantas Boeing 707 aircraft and a Royal Australian Air Force Lockheed C-130 Hercules transport.

The 1 ALSC Medical Corps, Service Corps, Ordnance Corps and Electrical and Mechanical Engineers worked with their respective US Army counterparts. The Dental Detachment found itself mainly treating American patients. The Australians were allocated an area north of Bien Hoa in cleared rubber plantation. Most of 1 ALSC was located in a 73 x 90 metre area about 900 metres north of the 173rd Airborne Brigade Maintenance Area. The perimeter was surrounded with barbed wire and patrolled at night by 14 men from 1 ALSC. To clear the scrub around the perimeter, 1 ALSC requested engineer assistance from the Americans, but the 173rd Airborne Brigade's engineer company had only light air-portable equipment. A request was made to Australia for a bulldozer, a grader and a forklift. In the meantime, the scrub was cleared by Vietnamese contractors and some graders borrowed from the US Air Force.

An engineer of 1st Australian Logistic Support Company manoeuvres his front-end loader while working near the base

The 1 ALSC Engineer Detachment consisted of one officer and twenty other ranks. This was inadequate for its initial task of constructing camp facilities, including electricity and running water, for 1 RAR and 1 ALSC. However, half the detachment was diverted to Saigon to construct accommodation for AAFV headquarters and 709 Signal Troop, and it was also called upon to establish a rest and recreation centre in Vũng Tàu. In the rush to prepare to move to Vietnam, 1 ALSC was unable to assemble the mandated 90 days' supplies, nor was 1 RAR able to gather its mandated 30 days' supplies, placing additional load on the already overburdened US logistics system. Not all demands could be met, so urgent maintenance requests were sent to Australia, to be despatched by sea or air. A fire in the 1 RAR lines on 11 June damaged tentage and stores, exacerbating the problem, and a few days later 1 RAR drew 1 ALSC's entire stock of pouches, water bottles and water bottle covers.

== Supply operations ==
Rations were drawn from US Army sources. The 173rd Support Battalion had no fresh vegetables, dehydrated or canned vegetables, and combat rations were in short supply. Bread was baked in Saigon but the local supplier consistently shipped stale bread. In September the problem was resolved by the 173rd Airborne Brigade establishing its own bakery. US rations were adjusted for Australian tastes and supplemented with purchases from the US commissary store and markets in Saigon. Fresh fruit was purchased in Saigon three days a week by the 1 ALSC administration officer. Since the US Army was alcohol free, special permission was obtained to supply the Australians with two cans of beer per man per day.

Sergeant Alan Harney checks ammunition supplies being loaded onto a US Army truck for the 1st Battalion, Royal Australian Regiment

The water supply for the 173rd Airborne Brigade was drawn from a nearby stream that had to be heavily chlorinated to be drinkable. Since it ran through the local countryside before reaching the brigade area, there were fears that it might be poisoned by the Viet Cong. The supply was inadequate for the 60,566 litres per day the Australians required even in the wet season, and the situation became critical as the country entered the dry season, so the Americans loaned a 400-US-gallon (1,500 L) water truck and a 10,000-US-gallon (38,000 L) pillow tank. The Americans agreed to sink a bore, but the plant required was unavailable. After the 3rd Field Troop arrived it drilled some shallow wells, and the safer supply was completed in January 1966.

Fuel was supplied from US sources. Most was held in 44-gallon drums. There was no problem until 20 September, when 1 ALSC was informed that 161 Reconnaissance Flight of No. 16 Army Light Aircraft Squadron was being sent to Vietnam with two Bell H-13 Sioux helicopters and two Cessna 180 Skywagon observation aircraft. Fuel for the former was no problem, as it used JP-4, which was readily available from the US Army, but the latter used 80/87 avgas, which was not used by the US Air Force. Some was purchased in Vung Tau and a supply contract was negotiated with Shell.

Ammunition was likewise sourced from the US Army but issued through 1 ALSC. This included 105 mm calibre artillery rounds used by the 105th Field Battery, Royal Australian Artillery, and the 161st Field Battery, Royal New Zealand Artillery. The Australians played a similar role to the Americans when it came to supplying the New Zealanders. The main uniquely Australian item was the 9 mm ammunition used by the F1 submachine gun and the 9 mm pistol. After the former was replaced by the M16 rifle, the ammunition was required only for the pistol, leaving 1 ALSC with five years' supply.

Captain Neil Spencer of Townsville, Qld (right), and Private John Van Roosmalen check boxes in the ordnance stores in the 1st Logistic Support Company area.

Some items had to be obtained from Australia. The Australian M113s had diesel engines whereas the American ones had petrol engines. Obtaining diesel fuel from the Americans was no problem, but spare parts had to come from Australia. The same applied to the Australian Land Rovers. The new GP boots started to arrive in December 1965 to replace the older canvas and rubber jungle boots, but 1 ALSC still held 4,366 pairs of these in stock. Medical stores soon ran low due to cuts made in the 1 ALSC establishment before it left Australia, and a severe shortage of the critical anti-malarial drug paludrine developed because 709 Signal Troop had left their initial issue behind. Specialised stores like vaccines were flown in by the RAAF courier from RAAF Butterworth.

== Disbandment ==
While 1 RAR and 1 ALSC were still deploying to Vietnam, the Chief of the General Staff, Lieutenant General John Wilton was already contemplating sending a brigade-sized task force to Vietnam. The larger formation could operate independently, and although it would still be under American operational control, it could more readily respond to military and political directives from Australia. On 8 March 1966, Harold Holt, who had succeeded Menzies as prime minister on 26 January, announced that a task force of 4,500 men would be sent to South Vietnam in May or June 1966.

This meant the end of 1 ALSC, as it was not designed to support that large a force. On 23 March, 1 ALSC was given notice that it would be moving to Vũng Tàu. Unit stores and vehicles would move to G Beach near Saigon, to be taken from there to Vũng Tàu in landing craft. Four 1 ALSC trucks were used, along with three 15-ton semi-trailers supplied by the US Army. Two Hercules transports were made available to move stores from Bien Hoa to Vũng Tàu by air. Personnel who had not completed their one-year tours in South Vietnam were reassigned to their parent units in the 1st Australian Logistic Support Group. MacDonald was succeeded by Captain Phillip H. B. Pritchard on 6 May and returned to Australia. The following day, 11 Movement Control Group, which had recently arrived in South Vietnam, advised that a landing craft, mechanized, (LCM) was due to beach at G Beach to move the stores. All available 1 ALSC vehicles, along with seven American trucks, were employed to move stores to G Beach. When the LCM arrived, it was found that there was no forklift to unload the stores. One was borrowed from the 173rd Engineer Company and stores were loaded the next day. By 9 May, only 30 pallets of stores remained in Bien Hoa, along with the 1 ALSC rear party of two officers and twenty-two other ranks. The rear party left for Vũng Tàu on 13 May and 1 ALSC was disbanded that day. The remaining stores were left in the care of a security party from 5 RAR.
