= HMAS Mollymawk =

Tugboat of Royal Australian Navy

History

Australia
- Name: Mollymawk
- Namesake: the Mollymawk
- Operator: Royal Australian Navy
- Builder: Poole & Steel, Sydney
- Launched: 1946
- Out of service: 1957

Australia
- Name: Mollymawk (AT 2383)
- Operator: Australian Army
- In service: 1957
- Out of service: 1963

Australia
- Name: Kallista
- Owner: Newsprint Mills Ltd, Hobart

General characteristics
- Type: Tugboat

HMAS Mollymawk (DT 933) was a tugboat of the Royal Australian Navy (RAN) between 1946 and 1957. She was then transferred to the Australian Army and was operated by the 32nd Small Ship Squadron, Royal Australian Engineers. In 1963 she was sold to Newsprint Mills Ltd in Hobart, Tasmania and was renamed Kallista.

== Construction and design ==
She was built in 1946 by Poole & Steel, Sydney and launched on 3 May 1946 as a tug for the RAN.

== Operational service ==
She was commissioned as DT 933 and served in Papua New Guinea waters between August 1946 to May 1949 when she was placed in reserve at HMAS Tarangau. She was commissioned in January 1950 and in September 1952, she was named HMAS Mollymawk. She served as a tender to HMAS Melville before being transferred to the Australian Army in 1957. On 6 October 1959 two men, Sappers Hugh Brooks and Ronald Leslie Hill, of Mollymawk were awarded the British Empire Medal for their "outstanding courage and seamanship". The men volunteered to board a lighter which was being towed by Mollymawk in heavy weather to reattach cables after the tow line parted. She served with the 32nd Small Ship Squadron, Royal Australian Engineers until 1963, when she was sold to Newsprint Mills Ltd in Hobart, Tasmania and was renamed Kallista.
