= HMAS Mother Snake =

History
- Name: Mother Snake
- Builder: Australian Ship Building Board
- Launched: 5 December 1944
- In service: 30 June 1945
- Out of service: 3 November 1945

General characteristics
- Tonnage: 300 tons
- Length: 125 ft (38 m)
- Beam: 24 ft (7.3 m)
- Depth: 12.6 ft (3.8 m)
- Installed power: 2 × Lister Blackstone diesel engines

HMAS Mother Snake was an auxiliary vessel operated by the Royal Australian Navy (RAN) during the Second World War. She was launched in 1944, as Australian Army AV 1354 Murchison transferred to the RAN and commissioned on 23 May 1945. She was used by the Services Reconnaissance Department and was paid off on 30 June 1945, before being handed over to the British Civil Administration in Borneo in 1945.
