= Australian landing ship Brudenell White =

1945 LSM-1-class landing ship medium

History

United States
- Name: LSM-477
- Builder: Brown Shipbuilding Co., Houston, Texas
- Commissioned: 3 April 1945
- Decommissioned: 15 May 1946
- Stricken: 15 May 1946
- Fate: Sold to Australia

Australia
- Name: Brudenell White (AV 1354)
- Namesake: General Sir Brudenell White
- Acquired: 16 July 1959
- Decommissioned: 30 September 1971
- Stricken: September 1971
- Fate: Renamed Paclog Utility, sunk off Cambodia by mine

General characteristics
- Class & type: LSM-1 Class Landing Ship Medium
- Displacement: 638 tons
- Length: 203 ft (62 m)
- Beam: 34 ft (10 m)
- Draft: 6 ft (1.8 m) light, 5 ft (1.5 m) loaded
- Propulsion: two Fairbanks Morse 18 cylinder opposed piston diesels, each 1,900 hp (1,400 kW), twin screws
- Speed: 14.5 knots (26.9 km/h)
- Range: 5,000 nmi (9,300 km; 5,800 mi)
- Capacity: Up to 306 tons, including four Centurion tanks
- Complement: 2 officers, 25 men
- Sensors & processing systems: Radar
- Armament: 1 × 40mm gun, 4 × 20mm gun mounts
- Armour: 10-lb. STS splinter shield to gun mounts, pilot house and conning station

The Australian landing ship medium Brudenell White (AV 1354) was a United States Navy landing ship medium which was later sold to Australia and operated by the Australian Army.

The ship was built by the Brown Shipbuilding Company in Houston, Texas and was commissioned into the United States Navy (USN) as USS LSM-477 on 3 April 1945. She was assigned to the Pacific Theater of Operations and performed occupation duty following the end of the war. She was decommissioned on 15 May 1946 and laid up in the Pacific Reserve Fleet.

The ship was purchased by the Australian Army on 16 July 1959 and was named Brudenell White (AV 1353) in honour of the Australian World War II general Brudenell White. The ship was one of four LSMs operated by the newly formed 32nd Small Ship Squadron, Royal Australian Engineers and was refitted in Japan before she arrived in Australia on 31 December 1959. From 1960 to 1970 she performed routine duties in support of the Australian Army, and carried equipment between ports in Australia, New Guinea, Malaysia and New Zealand. In October 1964 the Brudenell White steamed 595 km up PNG's Sepik River to the May River Junction in a 26-day mission, the furthest a ship of this size had travelled up the Sepik River.

The ship made her first deployment to a war zone in September 1970 when she sailed to Vung Tau in South Vietnam. She operated in South Vietnamese waters for about a month and returned to Sydney in November. She commenced a second voyage to South Vietnam in March 1971 but this was cancelled while she was en route.

Brudenell White was decommissioned on 30 September 1971 when the 32nd Small Ship Squadron was disbanded. She was sold to Pacific Logistics in September 1971 and was renamed Paclog Utility. The ship sunk when she struck a mine off the coast of Cambodia while being towed to her new operators there.
