= Australian landing ship medium Harry Chauvel =

1944 LSM-1-class landing ship medium

History

United States
- Name: LSM-319
- Builder: Pullman-Standard Car Manufacturing Company, Chicago, Illinois
- Commissioned: 10 August 1944
- Decommissioned: 14 June 1946
- Stricken: 14 June 1946
- Fate: Sold to Australia

Australia
- Name: Harry Chauvel
- Namesake: General Sir Harry Chauvel
- Commissioned: 16 July 1959
- Decommissioned: 30 September 1971
- Fate: sold and foundered at sea while under tow

General characteristics
- Class & type: LSM-1 Class Landing Ship Medium
- Displacement: 638 tons
- Length: 203 ft (62 m)
- Beam: 34 ft (10 m)
- Draft: 6 ft (1.8 m) light, 5 ft (1.5 m) loaded
- Propulsion: two Fairbanks Morse 18 cylinder opposed piston diesels, each 1,900 hp (1,400 kW), twin screws
- Speed: 14.5 knots (26.9 km/h)
- Range: 5,000 nmi (9,300 km; 5,800 mi)
- Capacity: Up to 306 tons, including four Centurion tanks
- Complement: 2 officers, 25 men
- Sensors & processing systems: Radar
- Armament: 1 × 40mm gun, 4 × 20mm gun mounts
- Armour: 10-lb. STS splinter shield to gun mounts, pilot house and conning station

The Australian landing ship medium Harry Chauvel (AV 1353) was a United States Navy landing ship medium which was later sold to Australia and operated by the Australian Army.

The ship was built by the Pullman-Standard Car Manufacturing Company in Chicago, Illinois and was commissioned into the United States Navy (USN) as USS LSM-319 on 10 August 1944. She was assigned to the Pacific Theater of Operations and saw action during the liberation of the Philippines during 1944 and 1945. Following the war she was decommissioned on 14 June 1946 and laid up in the Pacific Reserve Fleet.

The ship was purchased by the Australian Army on 16 July 1959 and was named Harry Chauvel (AV 1353) in honour of the Australian World War I general Harry Chauvel. The ship was one of four LSMs operated by the newly formed 32nd Small Ship Squadron, Royal Australian Engineers and was refitted in Japan before she arrived in Australia on 31 December 1959. From 1960 to 1964 Harry Chauvel supported Australian Army exercises and operated in a survey role on two occasions. In May 1964 she sailed for Malaysia and briefly took part in the Indonesian Confrontation in Borneo. During the late 60s the ship supported Australian Army exercises in Australian, New Guinea and New Zealand and made three voyages to South Vietnam to support the Australian units deployed there.

Harry Chauvel was decommissioned on 30 September 1971 when the 32nd Small Ship Squadron was disbanded. She was sold to Pacific Logistics in September 1971 and was renamed Paclog Dispatch. The ship foundered while under tow from Sydney to the Philippines.
