= Australian landing ship Clive Steele =

1946 LSM-1-class landing ship medium

History

United States
- Name: LSM-547
- Builder: Brown Shipbuilding Company, Houston, Texas
- Commissioned: 25 January 1946
- Decommissioned: 5 July 1955
- Fate: Sold to Australia

Australia
- Name: Clive Steele (AV 1356)
- Namesake: Major General Sir Clive Steele
- Acquired: 26 January 1960
- Decommissioned: 30 September 1971
- Fate: Sold to commercial interests, abandoned in Mekong Delta after rocket attack on 6 July 1973

General characteristics
- Class & type: LSM-1 Class Landing Ship Medium
- Displacement: 638 tons
- Length: 203 ft (62 m)
- Beam: 34 ft (10 m)
- Draft: 6 ft (1.8 m) light, 5 ft (1.5 m) loaded
- Propulsion: two Fairbanks Morse 18 cylinder opposed piston diesels, each 1,900 hp (1,400 kW), twin screws
- Speed: 14.5 knots (26.9 km/h)
- Range: 5,000 nmi (9,300 km; 5,800 mi)
- Capacity: Up to 306 tons, including four Centurion tanks
- Complement: 2 officers, 25 enlisted personnel; 4 officers and 47 other ranks (in Vietnam)
- Sensors & processing systems: Radar
- Armament: 1 × 40mm gun, 4 × 20mm gun mounts
- Armour: 10-lb. STS splinter shield to gun mounts, pilot house and conning station

The Australian landing ship medium Clive Steele (AV 1356) was a United States Navy landing ship medium which was later sold to Australia and operated by the Australian Army.

The ship was built by the Brown Shipbuilding Company in Houston, Texas and was commissioned into the United States Navy (USN) as USS LSM-547 on 25 January 1946. She was decommissioned on 11 March 1947 and laid up in the Atlantic Reserve Fleet. Recommissioned on 22 September 1950 and served during the Korean War between 1951 and 1953. She was decommissioned on 5 July 1955 and laid up in the Pacific Reserve Fleet.

The ship was purchased by the Australian Army on 26 January 1960 and was named Clive Steele (AV 1356) in honour of the Australian World War II general Clive Steele. The ship was one of four LSMs operated by the newly formed 32nd Small Ship Squadron, Royal Australian Engineers. From 1960 to 1971 she performed routine duties in support of the Australian Army, and carried equipment between ports in Australia, New Guinea, Malaysia and New Zealand.

The ship was deployed to Vung Tau in South Vietnam during the Vietnam War where she operated in South Vietnamese waters. Clive Steele was decommissioned on 30 September 1971 when the 32nd Small Ship Squadron was disbanded. She was sold to Pacific Logistics.

== Service ==
=== US Navy ===
Clive Steele was laid down at Brown Shipbuilding Company, in Houston, Texas, and commissioned into the United States Navy (USN) as USS LSM-547 on 25 January 1946. She was decommissioned on 11 March 1947 and laid up in the Atlantic Reserve Fleet. She was then re-commissioned on 22 September 1950 and served during the Korean War between 1951 and 1953. She was decommissioned again on 5 July 1955 and laid up in the Pacific Reserve Fleet.

=== Australian Army ===
In 1959, the Australian Army purchased four Landing Ship Medium (LSM) from the US Navy in Japan. These vessels were veterans of the Pacific Campaigns in World War II and the Korean War. They served extensively with 32 Small Ship Squadron in New Guinea and the South West Pacific and two of them served in Borneo during the confrontation with Indonesia in 1964. 32 Small Ship Squadron was disbanded in early 1972, after which the Royal Australian Navy (RAN) became responsible for all seagoing activities of the Defence Force.

She was one of the four Australian Army LSMs to serve in Vietnam. The Australian Army held one LSM vessel on station in Vietnam during the Australian involvement in support of both Australian and US forces operating mainly between Saigon, Vung Tau and Cam Ranh Bay. They also visited the coastal ports of Nha Trang, Phan Rang, Qui Nhon and Da Nang plus the Mekong Delta ports of My Tho, Can Tho and Bin Thuy. They were mainly on station to support Australian ground troops around Bien Hoa, Nui Dat and Vung Tau, but when not required they were used to support US Army units between the Mekong Delta and Danang. All LSM ships served in Vietnam with the John Monash undertaking the "shuttle run" between Australia and Vietnam.

== Design ==
=== Crew ===
Each LSM carried a crew of 4 officers and 47 other ranks, when on operations in Vietnam. While most of the manning was RAE, members of other Corps were also part of each crew, including medical, signals and ordnance. In Vietnam, the ships were fitted with a 40mm gun and several machine guns for protection. Signallers who served with the 32 Small Ship Squadron all became experienced ship Radio Operators who adapted to ships life, working both with the RAN and Army units in Vietnamese waters, without much support from RASigs. 32 Small Ship Squadron Headquarters (HQ) never left Australia and was located in Sydney. Once the ships sailed from their Sydney Base, operational control was run via the Commander Australian Fleet (COMAUSTFLT). In Vietnam waters the tasking was HQ Australian Vietnam Force (AFV) via HQ 1st Australian Logistics Support Group (1ALSG).

=== Ship conditions ===
The LSMs were built for short-term use landing supplies in the Pacific during World War II. As such the facilities for the crew were extremely basic. All accommodation spaces were below deck with poor ventilation with several sections of three tiered bunks in cramped and crowded conditions giving no room to roll over. Above the bunks were pipes lagged with asbestos, which would rain down on the sleeper during heavy seas, covering him in white dust. Toilet facilities were an open tray with a row of seats and no privacy. The Forrard Mess was the eating, meeting and relaxing place in each LSM. The flat-bottomed ships did not travel well in rough seas. When committed to the Vietnam War, the LSMs were already old ships in need of constant maintenance. On the Clive Steele's final voyage to Vietnam in 1970 one of the bow doors fell off whilst in transit. The LSM ships had to return to Sydney for repairs before taking up station in Vietnam.

== Fate ==
Clive Steele was decommissioned by the Australian Army in 1972 and sold to the Pacific Logistics S.A., Philippines. On 6 July 1973, she was struck by Communist rockets in the Mekong Delta where she was beached and abandoned. Her final resting place is unknown. USS LSM-547 Clive Steele earned four battle stars for her service in the Korean War alone. Clive Steele was also the only Australian LSM to sustain battle damage during the Vietnam War. Attacked in the Mekong Delta while sailing between Can Tho and Vung Tau on 5 January 1969, the ship was hit by three B40 RPG rockets. The water distilling plant and the refrigeration system were damaged, but there were no casualties amongst the crew.
