= HMAS Jeparit =

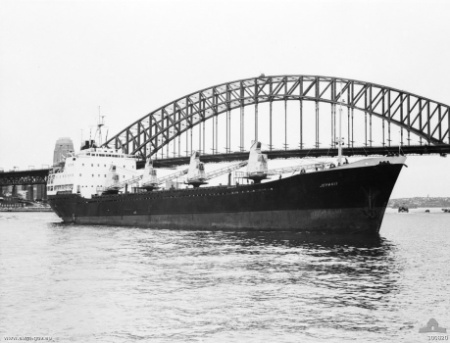
- HMAS Jeparit in front of the Sydney Harbour Bridge

History

Australia
- Builder: Evans Deakin & Co, Brisbane
- Laid down: 1962
- Launched: 5 October 1963
- Commissioned: 11 December 1969 (RAN)
- Decommissioned: 15 March 1972 (RAN)
- In service: 1964 (ANL)
- Identification: IMO number: 5427667
- Motto: "Supply and Support"
- Honours and awards: Battle honours: Vietnam 1969-72
- Fate: Broken up by 10 March 1993
- Badge

General characteristics
- Type: Bulk carrier
- Tonnage: 6,341 GT; 8,490 DWT
- Length: 435.6 ft (132.8 m)
- Beam: 56.6 ft (17.3 m)
- Draught: 22.7 ft (6.9 m)
- Propulsion: Sulzer 6-cylinder oil engine, 4500 bhp; Bow thruster
- Speed: 13 knots (24 km/h)
- Complement: 38
- Armament: None
- Notes: Taken from:

HMAS Jeparit was an Australian National Line (ANL) bulk carrier which was operated by the Royal Australian Navy (RAN) between 1969 and 1972. She was launched in 1964 and transported supplies to Australian military forces in South Vietnam between 1966 and 1972 under both civil and military ownership. She returned to service with ANL in 1972, being sold in 1979 to a Greek shipping company and renamed Pleias. She continued in civilian service under several names before being broken up in 1993.

== Construction ==
Jeparit was built for the Australian National Line. She was laid down at Evans Deakin & Co in Brisbane in 1962 and launched in 1963.

== Operational history ==
=== Vietnam War ===
In June 1966, she was chartered by the Department of Shipping and Transport to transport equipment and supplies from Australia to South Vietnam for the 1st Australian Task Force. This became an open-ended charter in August as the ship was needed to meet the supply needs of the Australian forces in South Vietnam, which were greater than had been anticipated by Army planners. The ship's cargo usually consisted of vehicles (including Centurion tanks), ammunition, civil aid program stores and supplies for the Australian Services Canteen Organisation. The ANL coastal cargo ship Boonaroo was also chartered to carry similar cargoes to South Vietnam, but was unable to embark tanks.

In February 1967, the Seamen's Union of Australia decided that it would not provide crews to Jeparit or Boonaroo for further voyages to South Vietnam; its members left both ships and were subsequently sacked by ANL. This move was not initially supported by most of the union movement and members of other maritime unions remained on board. While Boonaroo was commissioned into the RAN for a single voyage in March 1967, Jeparit remained under ANL control but was given a mixed crew of 20 merchant seamen and a RAN detachment of an officer and 17 sailors. The RAN detachment worked under the ship's civilian master, but was additionally under naval discipline.

The ship made 25 return trips to South Vietnam with a mixed crew between 1967 and December 1969. The naval and civilian sailors worked well together, though there was disquiet when it was discovered that the civilians' received a small "war bonus"<5th Engineer Peter Burge - Personal experience> during time spent in the war zone while the RAN personnel received only the usual allowances. This was resolved by paying the difference into the RAN Relief Trust Fund. Most voyages were between Sydney and Vung Tau, though the ship had to unload Centurion tanks at Cam Ranh Bay as there was no heavy lifting equipment at Vung Tau. Unloading and backloading times reduced over time as procedures improved and the crew gained experience, and by late 1967, the ship was operating on a three-day turnaround at Vung Tau.

Jeparit remained the occasional focus of anti-war attention between 1967 and 1969. The ship was targeted by a small protest in December 1967 and reloading in Sydney was occasionally disrupted by union activity. These protests came to a head in November 1969, when the Waterside Workers Federation refused to load or unload Jeparit. After a period of negotiation, the ship was commissioned into the RAN as HMAS Jeparit on 11 December. The ship's master was appointed Jeparit's commanding officer the next day and received a commission in the Royal Australian Naval Volunteer Reserve, but the ship continued to operate with a mixed civilian-naval crew. This did not end the ship's problems, however, as RAN personnel assigned to load the ship were initially slow and a building contractor had to be engaged to load tanks onto Jeparit after civilian crane operators refused their services. Army personnel from A Squadron 2nd Cavalry Regiment were also tasked with the job of unloading and loading the Jeparit.

HMAS Jeparit continued to travel between Australia and South Vietnam as a ship of the Royal Australian Navy. These voyages were generally uneventful, and the mixed crew continued to work together well and there were few further labour relations problems at Australian ports. Australian forces were withdrawn from South Vietnam in 1971 and 1972, and Jeparit completed her 43rd and final trip on 11 March 1972, when she returned to Sydney with the last Australian troops and equipment from South Vietnam. The ship had conducted five voyages with a civilian crew, 21 as an ANL ship with a mixed crew and 17 in RAN service.

Jeparit was decommissioned on 15 March and returned to ANL. She received the battle honour "Vietnam 1969-72" in recognition of her service while a commissioned vessel.

=== Post-war career ===
She continued in ANL service until September 1979 when she was sold the Greek company Massis Charity Shipping and renamed Pleias. She was later renamed Celestial I in 1984, Maria M. in 1987 and Sea Coral in 1988 and was broken up in early 1993.
