= Australian landing ship Vernon Sturdee =

1944 LSM-1-class landing ship medium

History

United States
- Name: LSM-315
- Builder: Pullman-Standard Car Manufacturing Company, Chicago, Illinois
- Commissioned: 13 July 1944
- Decommissioned: 14 June 1946
- Fate: Sold to Australia

Australia
- Name: Vernon Sturdee (AV 1355)
- Namesake: Lieutenant General Sir Vernon Sturdee
- Acquired: 26 January 1960
- Decommissioned: 1972
- Fate: Sold to commercial interests

General characteristics
- Class & type: LSM-1 Class Landing Ship Medium
- Displacement: 638 tons
- Length: 203 ft (62 m)
- Beam: 34 ft (10 m)
- Draft: 6 ft (1.8 m) light, 5 ft (1.5 m) loaded
- Propulsion: two Fairbanks Morse 18 cylinder opposed piston diesels, each 1,900 hp (1,400 kW), twin screws
- Speed: 14.5 knots (26.9 km/h)
- Range: 5,000 nmi (9,300 km; 5,800 mi)
- Capacity: Up to 306 tons, including four Centurion tanks
- Complement: 2 officers, 25 men
- Sensors & processing systems: Radar
- Armament: 1 × 40mm gun, 4 × 20mm gun mounts
- Armour: 10-lb. STS splinter shield to gun mounts, pilot house and conning station

The Australian landing ship medium Vernon Sturdee (AV 1355) was a United States Navy landing ship medium which was later sold to Australia and operated by the Australian Army.

The ship was built by the Pullman-Standard Car Manufacturing Company in Chicago, Illinois and was commissioned into the United States Navy (USN) as USS LSM-315 on 13 July 1944. She was assigned to the Pacific Theater of Operations and saw action during the liberation of the Philippines during 1944 and 1945. Following the war she was decommissioned on 14 June 1946 and laid up in the Pacific Reserve Fleet.

The ship was purchased by the Australian Army and was named Vernon Sturdee (AV 1355) in honour of the Australian World War II general Vernon Sturdee. The ship was one of four LSMs operated by the newly formed 32nd Small Ship Squadron, Royal Australian Engineers and was refitted in Japan before she arrived in Australia. From 1960 to 1970 she performed routine duties in support of the Australian Army, and carried equipment between ports in Australia, New Guinea, Malaysia and New Zealand.

The ship was deployed to Vung Tau in South Vietnam during the Vietnam War, where she operated in South Vietnamese waters. Vernon Sturdee was decommissioned on 30 September 1971 when the 32nd Small Ship Squadron was disbanded.

Vernon Sturdee was sold in June 1970 to P. R. Wieland Pty. Ltd. By 1982 had been converted at Ballina, New South Wales, with a new flush deck, a new bridge, spanning the deck, and improved accommodation, and renamed Jack Spry. She was reported as sunk off the Solomon Islands in 1984.
