= Australian Army ship John Monash (AS 3051) =

History

Australia
- Namesake: General Sir John Monash
- Operator: Australian Army (1965–1975)
- Launched: 1955
- Commissioned: 1965
- Decommissioned: 1975
- Identification: IMO number: 5226350

General characteristics
- Displacement: 1,010 tons light, 2,413 full load
- Length: 233.2 ft (71.1 m)
- Beam: 37.6 ft (11.5 m)
- Draft: 16.1 ft (4.9 m)
- Propulsion: One M47M British Polar diesel, single shaft, 1,120 bhp (840 kW)
- Speed: 11 knots (20 km/h)
- Capacity: 1,200 tons of cargo or 40 five-ton vehicles and 180 tons of cargo; 27 passengers
- Complement: 41
- Notes: Characteristics are for the ship's Army service and are from Gillet (1988)

John Monash (AS 3051) was a cargo ship operated by the Australian Army between 1965 and 1975.

== Service history ==
John Monash was built for the Associated Steamships Co. and was completed in 1955. She was purchased by the Australian Army in 1965 to provide a means of transporting cargo which was unsuitable for the Army's four Landing Ship Medium and was assigned to the 32nd Small Ship Squadron, Royal Australian Engineers. She was also used as a training ship and to supply Army units deployed in South Vietnam. In the later role she completed eleven voyages to South Vietnam between 1965 and 1972. The ship was sold in 1975 to a foreign company.
