= HMAS Boonaroo =

History
- Name: (United Kingdom) Boonaroo; Collin Four; Reunion
- Owner: Australian Shipping Board (1953–56); Australian National Line (1956–71); Collin Navigation Company (1971–72); Uni-Ocean Lines (1976–77); United Orient Lines (1977–85)
- Builder: Mort's Dock, Sydney
- Launched: 28 March 1953
- In service: 28 October 1953
- Identification: IMO number: 5048215
- Fate: Scrapped in 1985

History

Australia
- Commissioned: 1 March 1967
- Decommissioned: 8 May 1967
- Honours and awards: Battle honours: Vietnam War 1967
- Fate: Returned to civilian service

General characteristics
- Type: Cargo vessel
- Displacement: 1,789 tons (standard); 3,542 Gross tons (full load)
- Length: 391 ft (119.18 m) o/a
- Beam: 53 ft (16.15 m)
- Draught: 20 ft 9 in (6.32 m)
- Propulsion: 2 x Doxford diesel developing engines, 4,250 horsepower (3,170 kW)
- Speed: 12 knots (22 km/h; 14 mph)

HMAS Boonaroo (also known as MV Boonaroo) was an Australian National Line cargo vessel used to support Australian forces fighting in the Vietnam War. She was the first Australian ship to be commissioned after the introduction of the Australian White Ensign.

== Construction ==
Boonaroo was constructed for the Australian Shipping Board by Mort's Dock in Sydney. Displacing 1,789 tonnes (standard) and 3,542 tonnes at full load, Boonaroo was 391 ft (119.18 m) long, with a beam of 53 ft (16.15 m) and a draught of 20 ft 9 in (6.32 m). Powered by two Doxford diesel developing engines producing 4,250 horsepower (3,170 kW), the ship had a top speed of 12 knots (22 km/h; 14 mph).

== Operational history ==
Boonaroo was commissioned on 28 October 1953, operating between Brisbane, Sydney and Melbourne for the Australian Shipping Board. In October 1956, it passed with the Australian Shipping Board to the Australian Coastal Shipping Commission. In 1966, it was chartered by the Department of Shipping and Transport to carry Australian soldiers and supplies to South Vietnam. She completed one voyage to South Vietnam as a merchant vessel, leaving on 17 May 1966 and arriving back in Australia on 8 July 1966. However, members of the Seamen's Union of Australia refused to sail the vessel for subsequent voyages to South Vietnam in protest against Australia's involvement in the conflict.

To keep the ship operational, she was commissioned into the Royal Australian Navy (RAN) in Melbourne on 1 March 1967, and became the first Australian ship to be commissioned under Australian White Ensign. The crew were replaced by RAN personnel (most were drafted at short notice from Victorian naval base HMAS Lonsdale, while two ANL engineers aboard had their reserve commissions activated), and spent from 3 to 10 March at Point Wilson, loading a cargo of bombs for the Royal Australian Air Force (RAAF) and general cargo for the establishment and support of Australian facilities in Vietnam, including prefabricated kitchen structures, telegraph poles, and a fuel tanker.

Boonaroo sailed on 10 March, refuelled at Cairns on 17 March and reached Cam Ranh Bay on 28 March. The general cargo was unloaded that day by United States Army personnel. On 29 March, the freighter moved to the ammunition pier to offload the bombs. After unloading was complete, Boonaroo shifted to Vung Tau on 2 April, was replenished by a RAAF helicopter airlifting stores and provisions to the ship on 3 April, and sailed later that day. After stopping at Singapore on 5 and 6 April, then at Darwin from 12 to 20 April, Boonaroo sailed to Sydney, arriving on 29 April.

Boonaroo left Sydney for Melbourne on 3 May, arrived on 5 May, and was decommissioned from RAN service on 8 May. The 69-day commission was one of the shortest in RAN history: the duration meant that Boonaroo remained in ANL livery during her voyage, and no cap tallies were created for the ship's company. Because of the RAN's usual self-maintenance practices while at sea, Boonaroo was returned to ANL in better condition than she was received. Following a reorganisation of RAN battle honours in 2010, Boonaroo was retroactively awarded the honour "Vietnam 1967".

In January 1971, she was sold to Collin Navigation Co of Hong Kong, and renamed Collin Four and in 1972 transferred to a subsidiary company. The ship was sold to Uni-Ocean Lines of Singapore in February 1976 and renamed Reunion and again sold in November 1977 to United Orient Lines, Singapore. She was scrapped at Chittagong, Bangladesh in November 1985.
