= SS River Burnett =

Cargo steamship built 1946

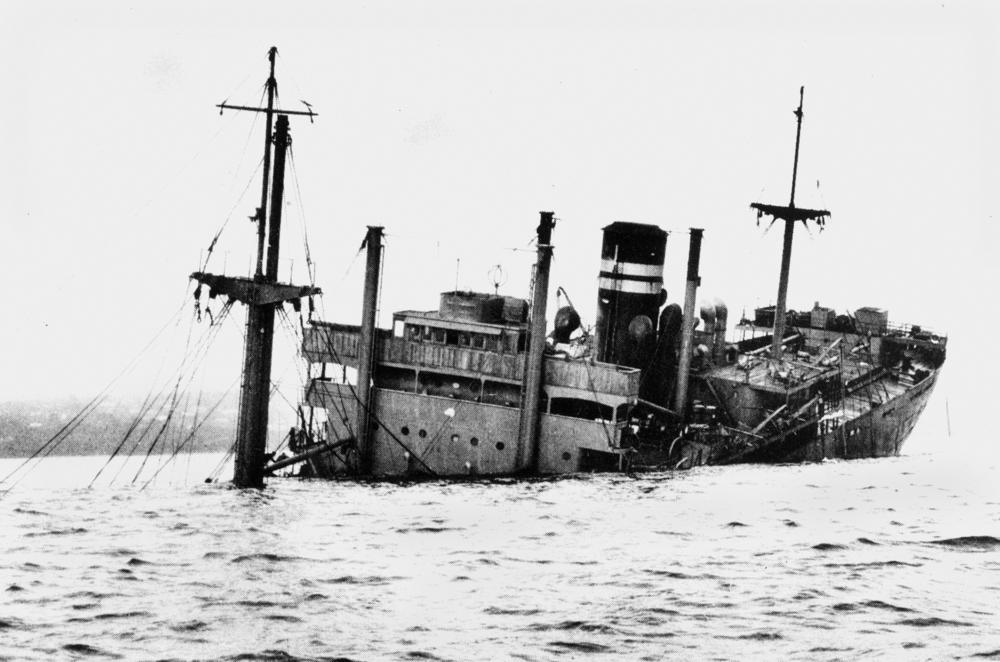
- River Burnett partly sunk in Port Phillip in 1955

History
- Name: 1947: River Burnett; 1965: Ionic Coast; 1967: Ilissos
- Namesake: 1947: Burnett River; 1965: Ionia; 1967: Ilisos
- Owner: 1947: Australian Shipping Board; 1957: Australian Coastal Shipping Commission; 1965: Australine Shipping Co; 1967: Devon Steamship Co; 1973: DL Wirth Corp
- Port of registry: 1947: (Australia) Brisbane; 1965: (Liberia) Monrovia
- Ordered: 22 January 1943
- Builder: Evans Deakin & Company, Brisbane
- Laid down: 2 November 1944
- Launched: June 1946
- Completed: November 1946
- Identification: 1947: UK official number 179033; 1947: call sign VLGS; IMO number 5297127
- Fate: Scrapped 1973

General characteristics
- Class & type: "A"-class cargo ship
- Tonnage: 1947: 6,660 GRT, 3,908 NRT; 1956: 5,183 GRT, 2,878 NRT, 8,525 DWT
- Length: 499 ft 1 in (152.12 m)
- Beam: 56 ft 8 in (17.27 m)
- Draught: 35 ft 8 1/2 in (10.9 m)
- Depth: 24 ft 6 1/2 in (7.5 m)
- Decks: 1 + shelter deck
- Propulsion: 1 × screw; 1 × triple expansion engine; 1 × low pressure steam turbine
- Speed: 12 knots (22 km/h)
- Crew: 46
- Sensors & processing systems: wireless direction finding; echo sounding device

SS River Burnett was a cargo steamship that was built in Queensland in 1946 and scrapped in Taiwan in 1973. She was a member of the "A"-class of standard cargo ships built for the Australian Shipbuilding Board between 1943 and 1947.

In 1955 River Burnett became notable as the first ship ever to survive hitting Corsair Rock in Port Phillip, Victoria. Numerous ships have been lost after hitting Corsair Rock. River Burnett succeeded in getting off the rock under her own power, but afterward her bow sank to the seabed. Her stern remained afloat, and a seven-week salvage operation succeeded in raising her.

River Burnett was successfully repaired, and gave many more years of service. In 1965 she was flagged out to Liberia and renamed Ionic Coast. In 1967 she was renamed again as Ilissos. She was scrapped in 1973 in Kaohsiung.

== "A"-class cargo ship design ==
In 1941 the Australian Shipbuilding Board commissioned a set of standard designs for cargo ships. One design, the "A"-class, was for a cargo steamship of about 5,000 GRT with five holds and a shelter deck. An existing design was copied, and adapted by extending the bulkheads up to the shelter deck to improve wartime safety.

For cargo handling, each ship was to have one 20-ton heavy derrick and ten five-ton derricks, each with its own steam winch. Each ship had also a warping winch.

The single screw was powered by a combination of a three-cylinder triple expansion engine and a Bauer-Wach low pressure steam turbine. The Commonwealth Government Marine Engine Works was established to build the reciprocating engines, cargo winches and steering engines, and assemble the Bauer-Wach turbines.

Exhaust steam from the low-pressure cylinder of the reciprocating engine drove the turbine. The turbine drove the same shaft as the reciprocating engine via a Föttinger fluid coupling and double reduction gearing.

== Building the "A"-class ==
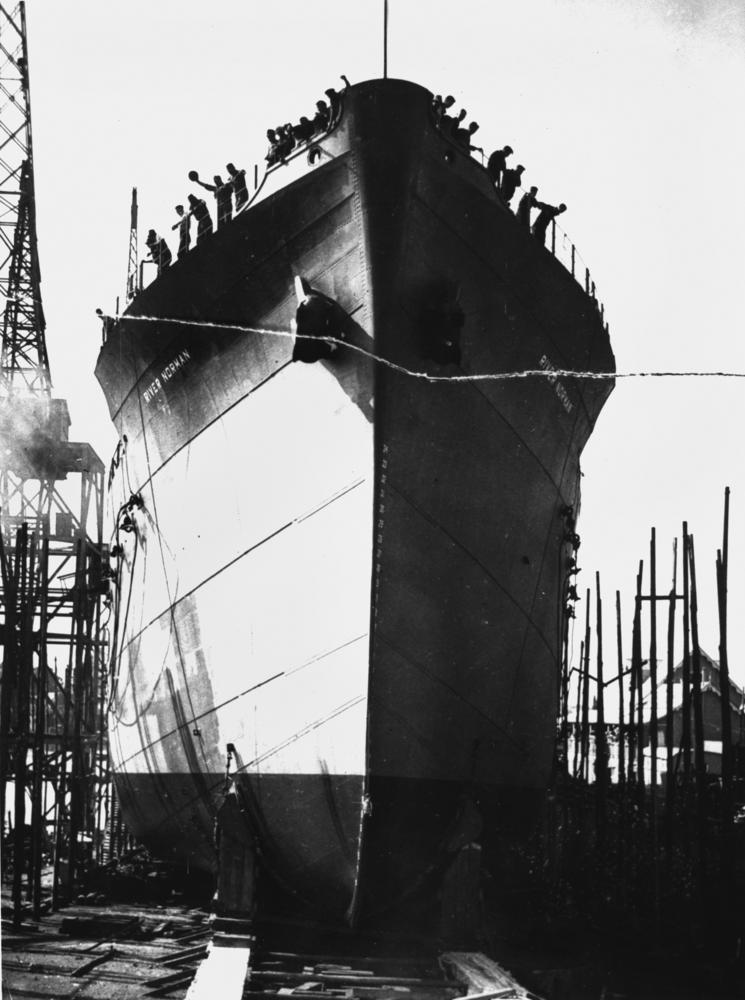
Launching River Norman in 1945

In June 1941 the Shipbuilding Board ordered the first six "A"-class ships: two from Cockatoo Docks & Engineering Company in Sydney, two from Evans Deakin & Company in Brisbane, and one each from BHP in Whyalla and the Commonwealth Naval Dockyard in Williamstown, Victoria.

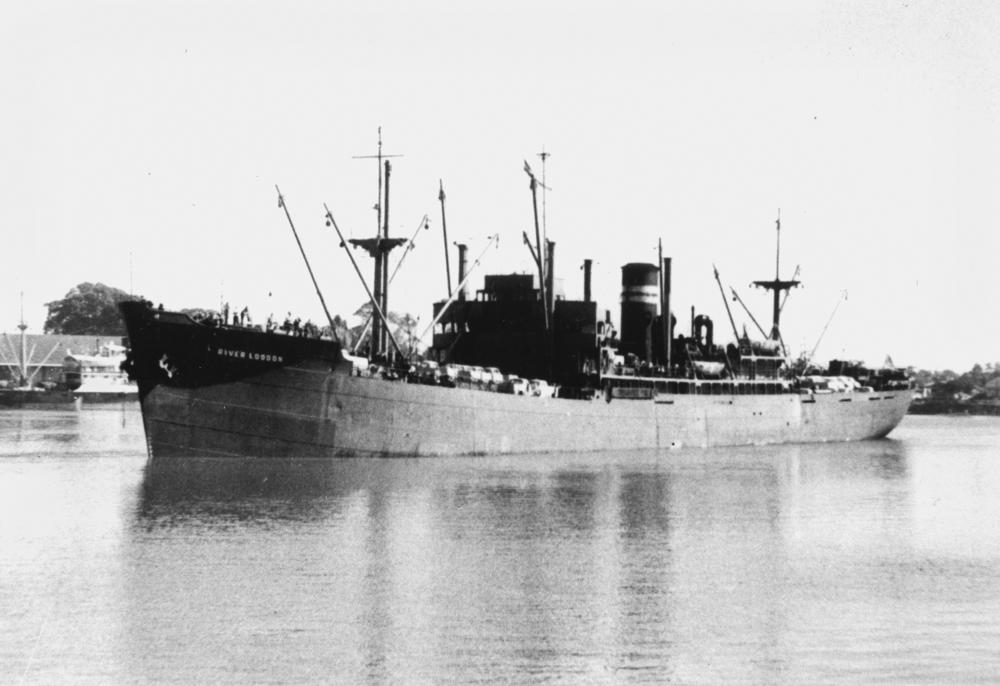
River Loddon

The "A"-class was nicknamed the River-class, because each was named after an Australian river. Cockatoo laid the keel for River Clarence in July 1941. Evans Deakin & Company laid the keel for River Burdekin that September. In October 1941 the board ordered three more "A"-class ships from BHP. In December 1941 Evans, Deakin laid the keel for River Fitzroy and BHP laid the keel for River Loddon.

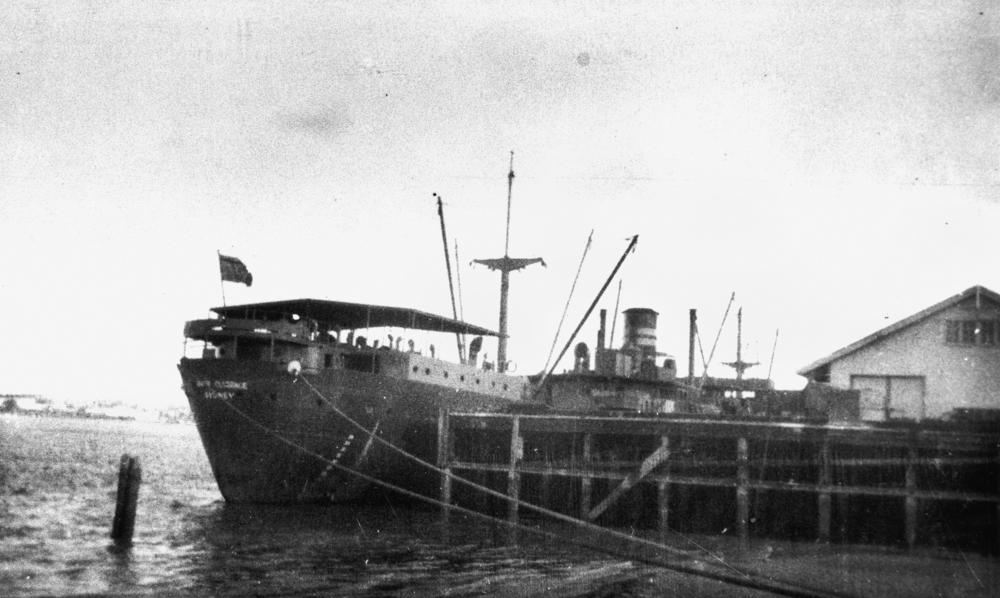
River Clarence

Progress was slow. Cockatoo launched River Clarence in January 1943 and completed her that May. Evans Deakin launched River Burdekin in March 1943 and completed her that December. BHP launched River Glenelg, River Murchison and River Derwent between October 1943 and September 1944, and completed them between March 1944 and February 1945.

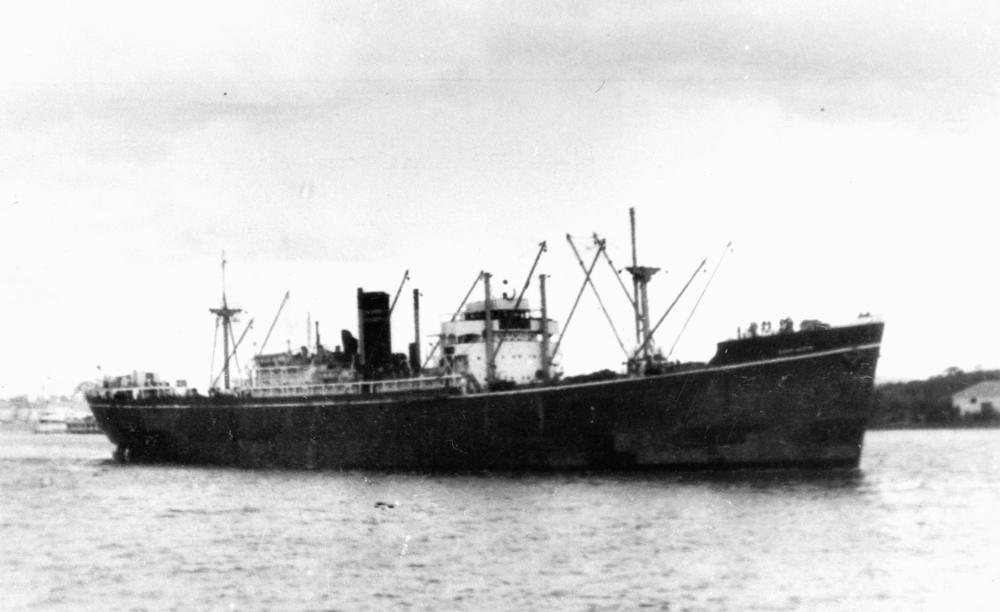
River Mitta

Evans, Deakin launched River Fitzroy in February 1944 and completed her that November, 35 months after her keel was laid. The Commonwealth dockyard did not lay the keel for River Mitta until December 1942. She was launched in April 1945 and completed that November, again 35 months after her keel was laid. Cockatoo did not lay the keel for River Hunter until July 1943. She was launched in October 1945 and completed some time in 1946.

The Shipbuilding Board ordered a final four "A"-class ships in 1943: two from Evans, Deakin in January and two from BHP in September and December. Evans, Deakin laid the keel for River Norman in June 1943, launched her in May 1945 and completed her in 1946. BHP laid the keels for River Murrumbidgee and River Murray in 1944, launched them in 1945 and completed them later that year.

River Burnett was not the last ship to be ordered but she was the last to be built. The Shipbuilding Board ordered her from Evans, Deakin at the same time as River Norman, in January 1943, but her keel was not laid until 2 November 1944. She was launched in June 1946 and completed in November 1946.

In total, 13 "A"-class ships were built.

== Description of River Burnett ==
River Burnett's registered length was 499 ft 1 in (152.12 m), her beam was 56 ft 8 in (17.27 m) and her depth was 24 ft 6 1/2 in (7.5 m). As built, her tonnages were 6,660 GRT and 3,908 NRT.

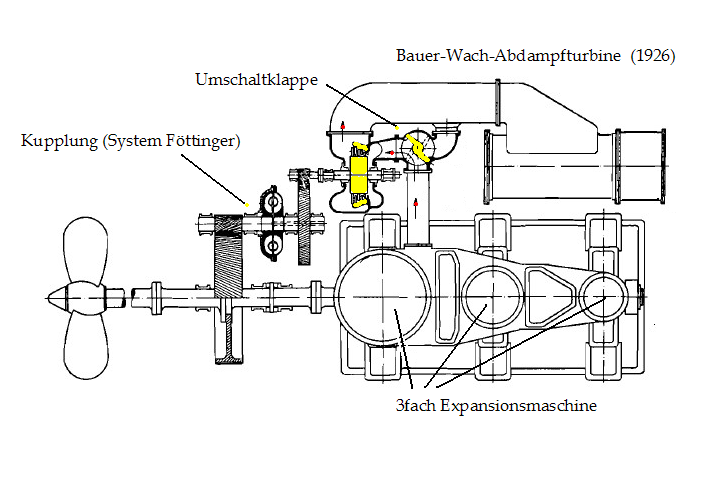
Plan of a triple-expansion piston engine with Bauer-Wach exhaust turbine system. Yellow marks the turbine rotor and the diverter valve. The Föttinger fluid coupling is between the intermediate gears.

River Burnett had a single screw. Her main engine was a three-cylinder triple expansion engine built by the Commonwealth Government Marine Engine Works in Brisbane. Steam from its low-pressure cylinder could be either returned to a condenser or used to drive a low-pressure steam turbine.

With both engines in use, River Burnett could maintain a speed of 12 knots (22 km/h). When cruising at 10 1/2 knots (19.4 km/h) she could cover about 250 miles a day, and would burn about 27 tons of fuel oil.

In September 1947 River Burnett was registered in Brisbane. Her official number was 179033 and her call sign was VLGS. The Department of Supply and Shipping managed River Burnett for the Commonwealth Government.

== Grounding ==
In July 1955 River Burnett was carrying a cargo of 7,800 tons of coal from Callide, Queensland, bound for Port Melbourne. On the night of 17–18 July she was passing through The Rip of Port Phillip in an ebb tide that was running to the southwest at about 5 knots (9 km/h).

The ship tended to swing to starboard, so her Master, Captain CL O'Toole, ordered his helmsman to turn her to starboard, and then hard a'starboard, to steady her. But she swung off course, so he ordered his helmsman to change course hard a'port. The ship then "gave a wild sheer south", so at about 0105 hrs O'Toole asked the engine room to check her steering gear. A few minutes later the ship hit Corsair Rock. The engine room reported that the steering gear was working correctly.

After ten minutes the ship freed herself from the rock by running her engines full astern. A hole 15 by 7 feet (5 by 2 m) was torn in her hull, and her crew found that water was rising in her number two hold. Her crew used her three pumps to stem the rise of water in her forward holds, and O'Toole tried to navigate her to a part of the shore where she could be safely beached.

However, River Burnett slowly sank by her bow, and after about four and a half hours her bow struck the seabed about a mile off Point Davy, between Frankston and Mornington. Her bow lay in water about 50 feet (15 m) deep, and she was also listing ten degrees to port. Her port boiler was submerged, but her starboard boiler remained above water and continued to provide steam for her pumps and electric lighting. The tug Howard Smith rescued 36 members of her crew. 10 men stayed aboard River Burnett to work her pumps and starboard boiler try to keep her stern afloat.

The ship quickly became a public spectacle. The cars of thousands of sightseers congested roads around Frankston, Mornington and Mount Eliza.

== Salvage ==
On the morning of Monday 18 July an assistant marine superintendent, Captain Raddats, came aboard to assist. Also on 18 July a salvage expert, Captain JP Williams, came aboard to take charge of raising River Burnett from the seabed. Williams had made his name in 1941 by being part of the syndicate that recovered 555 bars of gold bullion from the wreck of RMS Niagara in New Zealand. By 19 July two other salvagers, Captains J Fant and R Menzies, had joined him.

Seawater filled River Burnett's three forward holds, and began to seep through the bulkhead between number three hold and the engine room. If the bulkhead failed, the engine room would be flooded and its crew endangered. The sinking of the bow had raised the stern partly out of the water. This left the weight of coal in the after holds unsupported, which created a risk that the ship could break her back.

On 18 July the tug Vigorous from Melbourne brought a floating coal grab belonging to the Harbor Trust alongside River Burnett. The grab was to start discharging coal from her holds, reducing the strain on the ship's hull and helping her to regain buoyancy. The grab dumped the coal into the waters of Port Phillip.

On Tuesday 19 July, salvage equipment including compressors, oxy-acetylene cutting equipment, and extra pumps was put aboard River Burnett, and a salvage diver started preparatory work on the forward part of the ship. The workshop of a local salvage company started fabricating coffer dams that would be taken out to the ship and installed to give access to her number one and number two holds. Captain O'Toole was taken ashore for questioning, and his First Officer, Michael Brunton, took over command.

Also on 19 July, the bulkhead between number three hold and the engine room deteriorated. The leak of water into the engine room increased, but the pumps were enough to protect the crew and the starboard boiler. By Wednesday 20 July the strain on River Burnett had started to separate some of the plates of her hull. On the same day, seawater fractured a pipe. This sprayed water into a furnace of the starboard boiler, causing it to fail. This left the ship without steam, and hence unable to work her derricks, some of which had been working along with the floating grab to discharge coal from number three hold into the sea. After five hours, the engine room crew managed to get one of her boilers re-started.

On Thursday 21 July two tugs, Batman and Vigorous, tried to turn River Burnett to improve conditions for the salvage men working aboard her. One of the towlines broke, however, and the attempt was aborted.

In the first week of August the weather and sea became rougher. On 7 August another "A"-class cargo ship, River Hunter, got into difficulty outside Port Phillip Heads, and the tug Batman went to her aid. On the night of 7–8 August a northwesterly gale dislodged River Burnett's bow from the seabed and drove her about a quarter mile closer to shore. The gale damaged much of the salvage crew's work, but put the damaged ship in a safer position. By 9 August, rough seas had prevented boats from bringing River Burnett fresh victuals for four days.

By Friday 2 September, cables had been laid connecting River Burnett to the shore near Davy Point, a distance of about a mile. They were marked with two buoys, and vessels were warned not to pass between the ship and the shore. The salvage experts, Captains Williams and Fant, raised the ship on Sunday 4 September.

On Friday 9 September Captain Brunton brought River Burnett into Melbourne under her own power, and she docked at South Wharf to discharge the remaining 5,550 tons of her cargo of coal. On Tuesday 12 September fire broke out in the 1,250 tons of coal in number 5 hold, at the stern of the ship, as it was being discharged. There was a series of small explosions in the cargo, and firefighters poured thousands of gallons of water into the hold to extinguish it.

On Tuesday 27 September three tugs, including Howard Smith and Taronga, towed River Burnett to Duke and Orr's dry dock to be repaired. In the process a tow-line snapped, injuring a member of Taronga's crew. River Burnett hit the wharf three times, but did not sustain further damage.

== Marine Court of Inquiry ==
Mr Justice Simpson, of the Supreme Court of the Australian Capital Territory, presided over a Marine Court of Inquiry. Two assessors, Captains SB Page and AS Johnson, sat with him.

Captain O'Toole gave evidence on 29 August. He told the court that he held a pilot's exemption certificate for Port Phillip, and he had taken ships in and out through the Heads 25 times.

On 1 September the Court reached its verdict that O'Toole made a navigational error that caused River Burnett to hit Corsair Rock, and this amounted to misconduct. However, Captains Page and Johnson disagreed with the finding. And the court congratulated O'Toole on his actions after the grounding, by which he got his ship off Corsair Rock and navigated both the ship and her crew to safety. The Court decided not to cancel or suspend his Master's certificate.

== Australian Coastal Shipping Commission ==
In 1956 River Burnett's tonnages were reduced to 5,183 GRT, 2,878 NRT and 8,525 DWT. On 9 March she left Melbourne for Adelaide, so that may be when her repairs were completed. Also in 1956 the Australian Coastal Shipping Commission was founded, and in 1957 River Burnett became part of its fleet.

== Liberian service ==
In April 1965 Coastal Shipping Commission sold River Burnett to the Australine Shipping Co, Ltd, who renamed her Ionic Coast and registered her in Monrovia. In 1967 Australine sold her to the Devon Steamship Corp, who renamed her Ilissos but kept her registered in Monrovia.

== Detention and disposal ==
In April 1968 Ilissos was detained in Saigon in South Vietnam. In 1973 she was sold for scrap to the DL Wirth Corporation of North Hollywood. In September 1973 she was towed more than 1,100 nautical miles (2,000 km) across the South China Sea to Kaohsiung in Taiwan, where she was scrapped.
