= Mud Island (disambiguation) =

Mud Island is a small peninsula, surrounded by the Mississippi River to the west and the Wolf River Harbor to the east, within the Memphis city limits.

Mud Island may also refer to:

- Mud Islands, Victoria, Australia
- Mud Island (Queensland), Australia
- Mud Island (Ontario), an island of Ontario, Canada
- Mud Island (Michigan), U.S.
- Mud Island, site of Revolutionary War-era Fort Mifflin in Philadelphia, Pennsylvania, U.S.
- Mud Island (Brazoria County, Texas), an island of Texas, U.S.
- Former name of Ballybough area of Dublin, Ireland.
