= Australian Army ship Crusader (AV 2767) =

Australian Army amphibious operations support ship of World War II

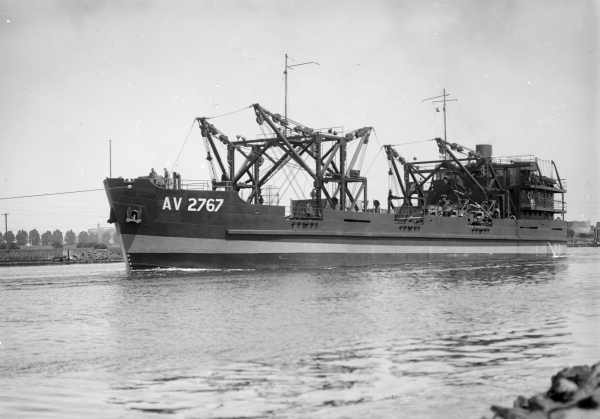
- Crusader in December 1945

History

Australia
- Operator: Australian Army (1945–1947); Australian Shipping Board (1947); Queensland Cement and Lime Company (1947–1984)
- Builder: Melbourne Harbour Trust, Williamstown Dockyard
- Launched: 8 August 1945
- Commissioned: Late 1945
- Decommissioned: 1947
- Out of service: 1984
- Renamed: Cementco (1947); Crusader II (1984?)
- Fate: Sunk as a dive wreck in 1986

General characteristics
- Displacement: 1,500 long tons (1,500 t)
- Length: 200 ft (61.0 m)
- Beam: 50 ft (15.2 m)
- Draft: 12 ft (3.7 m)
- Ramps: Six vehicle loading ramps
- Propulsion: Six Ruston & Hornsby engines and six propellers
- Speed: 9 knots (17 km/h)
- Endurance: 30 days
- Capacity: 1,500 long tons (1,500 t) of cargo in three holds and 40 vehicles as deck cargo
- Complement: 31
- Armament: Fitted for self-defence guns at the bow and stern
- Notes: Characteristics are for the ship's Army service and are from and

Crusader (AV2767) was an Australian Army amphibious operations support ship of World War II. She was launched shortly before the war ended and entered service in late 1945. From 1945 to 1947 she was mainly used to return Australian Army equipment from the islands off New Guinea. She was also loaned to the Australian Shipping Board in early 1947 and transported earth moving equipment and timber between Melbourne and Tasmania. However, the Army did not need a ship with Crusader's capabilities after the war, and she was sold in 1947 to the Queensland Cement and Lime Company which operated her as a coral barge on the Brisbane River until the mid-1980s. The ship was scuttled in 1986 and became a popular dive wreck.

== Design and construction ==
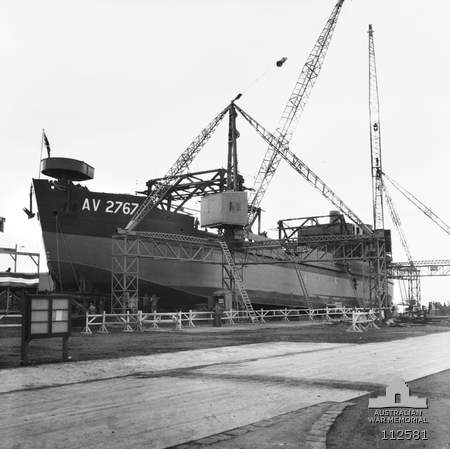
Crusader under construction

During late 1944 and early 1945 the Australian Army suffered from a shortage of shipping, leading to delays in moving heavy equipment and small watercraft from Australia to operational areas in the South West Pacific. While several British and United States vessels were eventually made available in mid-1945, the Australian Army's chief engineer, Major General Clive Steele, chose to design and build a heavy lift ship for the Army. Steele personally designed the ship, which was intended to support amphibious operations and transport supplies. He deliberately underestimated the project's cost in order to gain approval for the ship's design and construction.

The ship's design incorporated a number of unusual features. Crusader had a shallow draft to allow her to operate close to the shore, as well as four rudders and six engines driving six propellers to give her a high degree of manoeuvrability. While the ship required engines capable of generating a total of 2,000 horsepower (1,500 kW), the largest engines which were available in Australia at the time each generated only 220 horsepower (160 kW) horsepower. Only six of these engines could be fitted into the ship, and she was considered under powered during her Army service. Her hold could carry 1,500 long tons (1,500 t) of stores and an additional 40 vehicles could be embarked on her deck. The ship also had six 30-long-ton (30 t) cranes to move heavy equipment, as well as six bridge-like structures which were used to embark and disembark vehicles. This equipment allowed her to discharge cargo at the rate of 90 long tons (91 t) at any one time. Crusader had a 'box-like' appearance, and her design did not impress naval engineers.

Crusader was built by the Melbourne Harbour Trust at Williamstown Dockyard. She was the largest all-welded steel vessel to have been constructed in Australia at the time, and her final price of £124,000 was considerably more than Steele's deliberate underestimate. The ship was launched on 8 August 1945 after being named by Steele's wife, and later became the largest ship to be commissioned by the Australian Army during World War II. Construction of a sister ship, to be called AV2768 Corsair, was also begun, but this ship was cancelled when the war ended.

== Service history ==
=== Australian Army ===
The ship completed her sea trials in late November 1945, and subsequently entered service with the Army's No. 2 Ordnance Craft Park. In February 1946 Crusader sailed to Rabaul in New Britain and later Torokina, Bougainville. During these and later voyages she proved successful in her intended role, and returned supplies and equipment from the islands to Australia. She also transported the bodies of 600 Australian servicemen killed during the fighting in the Solomon Islands to Port Moresby for permanent interment in the war cemetery there. Other unusual tasks undertaken by the vessel included transporting 800 New Guineans from Aitape, Madang, Torokina and Wewak to a dispersal centre located in Rabaul and moving 44 tanks from Torokina to Sydney.

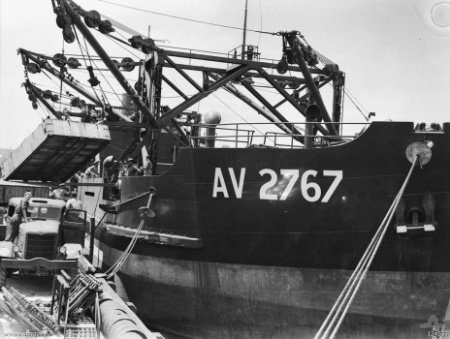
Crusader loading or unloading cargo in December 1945

By January 1947 the Army no longer needed a ship with Crusader's capabilities, and she was loaned to the Australian Shipping Board. In February that year she transported a load of earth moving equipment from Melbourne to Launceston, and carried a cargo of timber back to Melbourne. She continued to be manned by an Army crew and made several further trips between Tasmania and the mainland, but in April 1947 it was reported that the ship was to be scrapped on the grounds that she was considered unseaworthy. Gil Duthie, the Federal member for Wilmot, sought to have Crusader retained in service until the shortage of shipping capable of transporting heavy loads to and from Tasmania was rectified. The Shipping Control Board rejected Duthrie's representations on the grounds that Crusader would need extensive alterations before she could be permanently used for commercial trade, and it would take at least a year to complete the necessary works. However, the Board gave a commitment to make other ships available to transport timber from Tasmania. Crusader was subsequently offered for sale, and was purchased by the Queensland Cement and Lime Company (QCL). She arrived at Brisbane on 28 September 1947 and was subsequently renamed Cementco.

=== Queensland Cement and Lime Company ===
QCL used Cementco as a self-propelled coral barge. The ship was converted to this role in Brisbane by the firms Evans Deakin, Evans, Anderson, Phelan & Co. Modifications included moving the wheel-house from the aft superstructure to about 50 feet (15 m) from the bow and extensively altering the cargo holds to carry up to 2,000 long tons (2,000 t) of coral. After these works were completed in July 1948 The Courier-Mail reported that they had "made the strangest vessel on the Australian waterfront even stranger". Cementco's stern was later extended so that each member of her crew had their own cabin.

In her new role the ship carried coral which had been dredged from Moreton Bay by the converted Landing Ship Tank Coral (the former HMAS LST 3022) to QCL's cement factory at Darra in Brisbane. Like the rest of QCL's small fleet, Cementco underwent a period of extensive maintenance at the Cairncross dry dock in Brisbane once every three years. During the 1974 Brisbane flood the ship's crew had to fasten Cementco to the pylons of the Story Bridge to prevent her from being carried down the Brisbane River.

Cementco continued to transport coral until the mid-1980s, when QCL was acquired by the firm Holderbank and another ship was purchased to transport clinker to the company's new factory at Gladstone. She was subsequently laid up at Mary Street Wharf while attempts were made to sell her; during this period she was renamed Crusader II to avoid confusion with a new ship named Cementco. A buyer was not found, and in 1986 Cementco was sunk at Flinders Reef off Cape Moreton where she later became a popular dive wreck.
