= Mud Island (Queensland) =

Island in Queensland, Australia

Native name: Bungumba
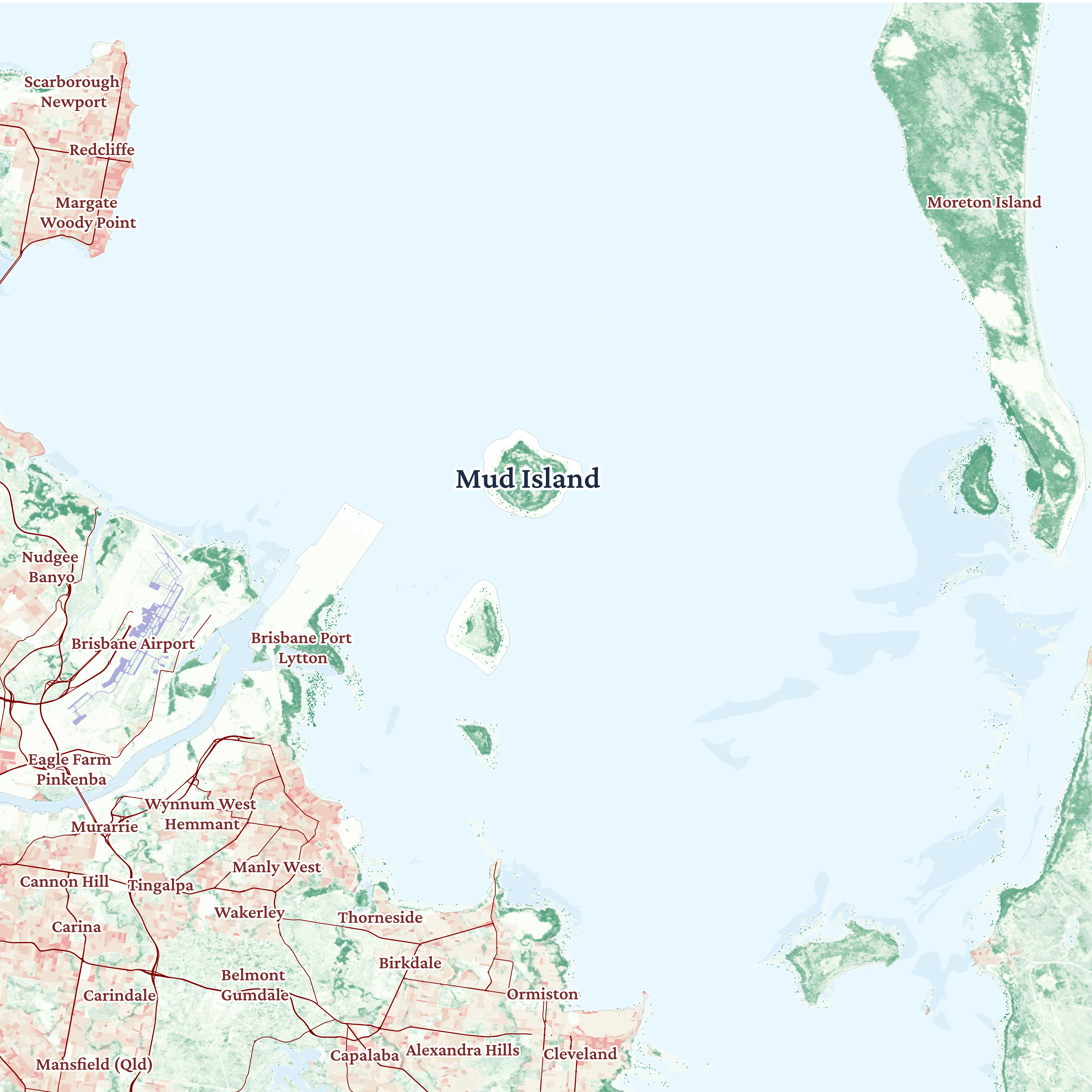
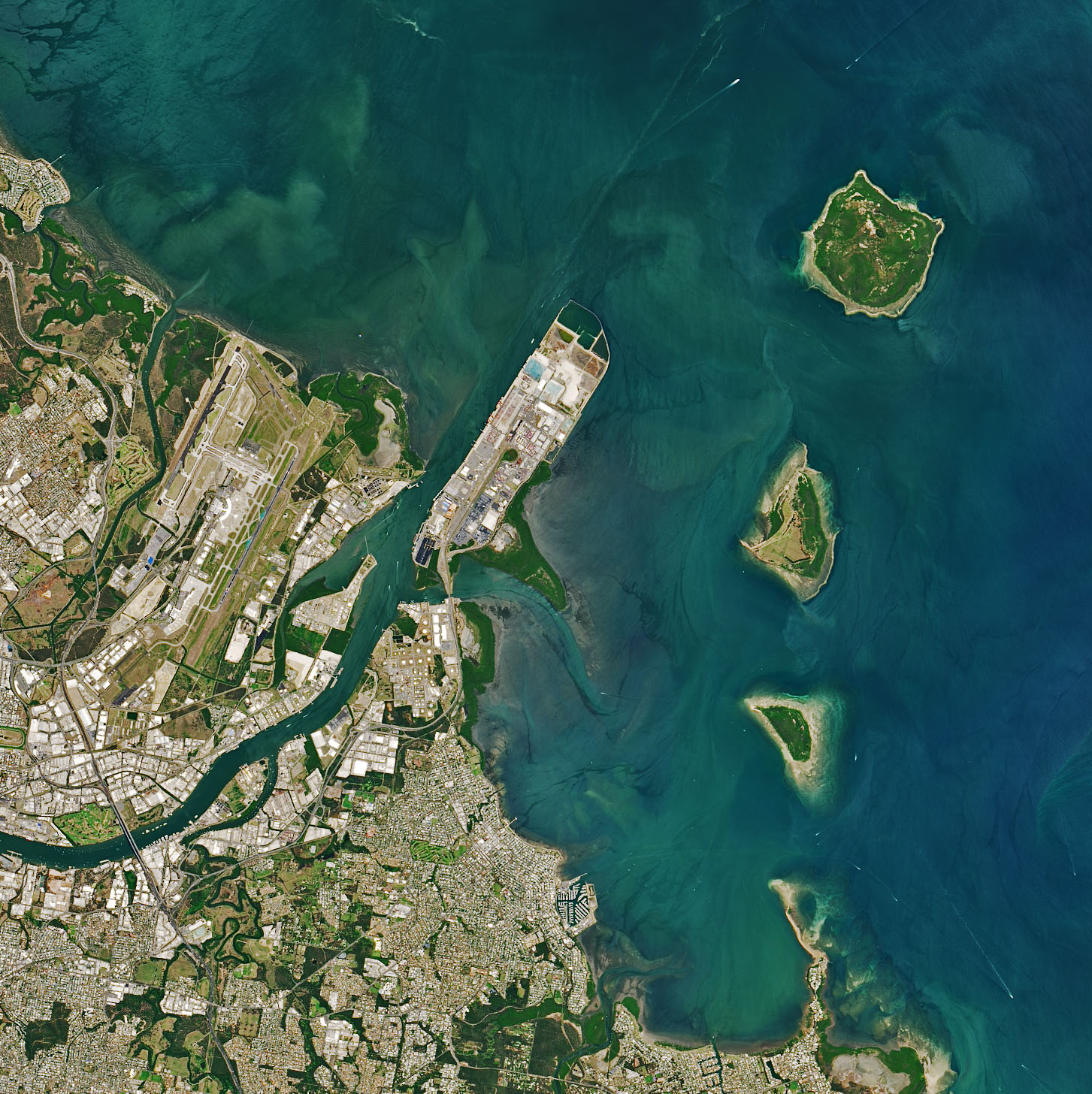
- Mud Island is located in Moreton Bay, near the Port of Brisbane Mud Island (top right) is the terminus of a chain of islands extending from Wellington Point
- Interactive map of Mud Island

Geography
- Location: Moreton Bay
- Coordinates: 27.3389°S 153.25111°E
- Area: 4.24 km^{2} (1.64 sq mi)

Administration
- Australia
- State: Queensland
- LGA: Brisbane City Council (Wynnum-Manly)
- Queensland State Electoral Division: Lytton
- Federal Electoral Division: Bonner

Mud Island is an intertidal saltmarsh island and conservation park located in Moreton Bay, South East Queensland. Situated approximately 4 km from the Port of Brisbane, the island is the largest in a chain that extends from Wellington Point, which includes King Island, Green Island and St Helena Island. The name is a misnomer, as the island is an intertidal mangrove reef composed primarily of coral.

Most of the island is submerged at high tide, with only a small fraction of the 4.24 km^{2} area constitutively above the high-water mark. Although the island attracted protections in the early twentieth century, recognising it as a sanctuary for birds and fish, the surrounding reef was excavated as the result of decades of coral dredging by the Queensland Cement and Lime Company, significantly reducing its area. The island was designated as a conservation park in 2000.

== Environment ==
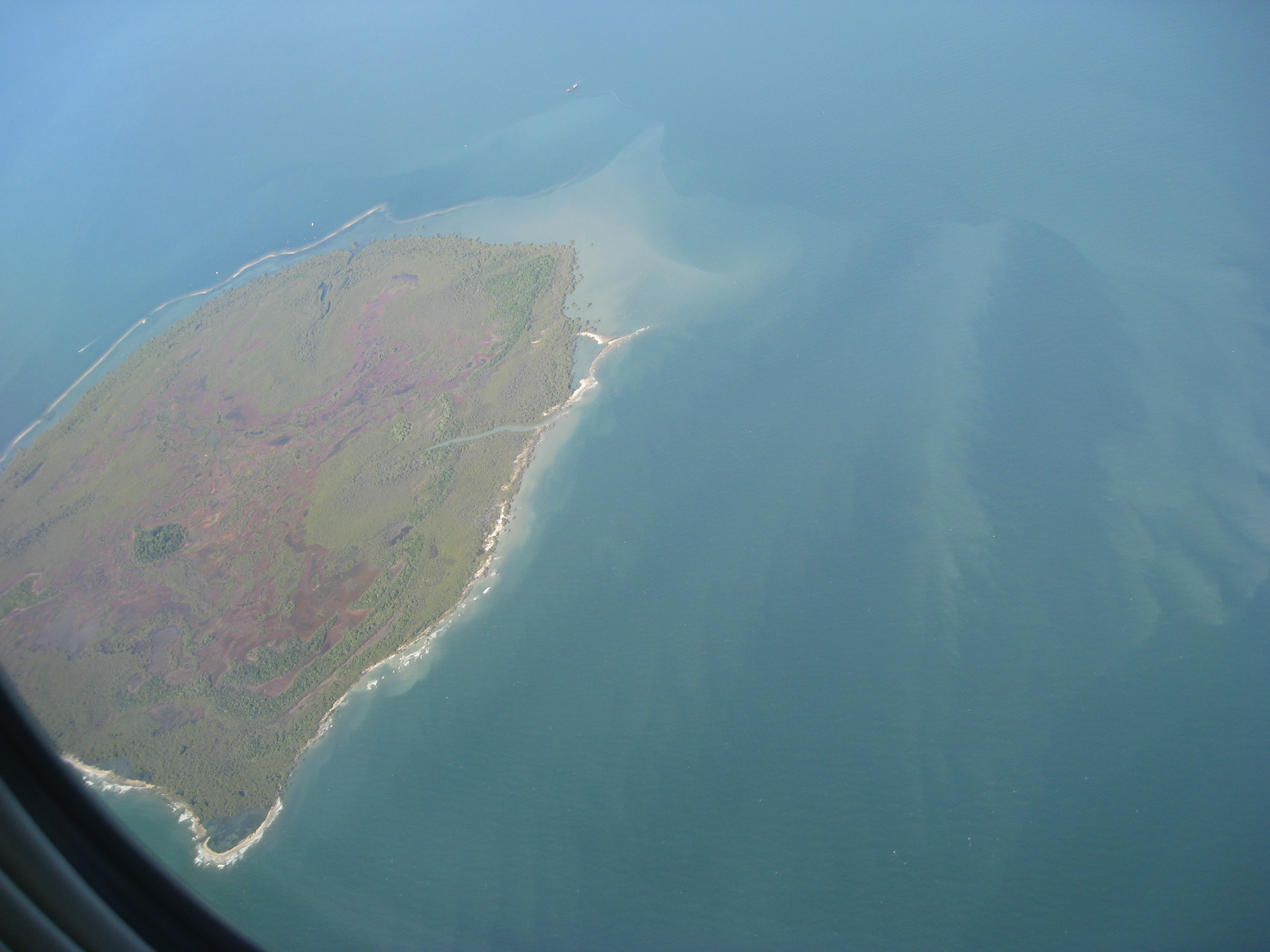
Mud Island in 2009. The high water mark can be seen bounding a small section in the centre of the island.

The island is a vegetated reef primarily populated by mangroves. As such, despite its name, the island's beaches are composed of coral. Prior to extensive dredging, the coral grew plentifully around the island – in 1932, Henry Richards described "excellent and quite extensive masses of growing coral" off the southern end. In 1938, Dorothy Hill visited the islands of Moreton Bay, including Mud Island and described the banks as 'fringing coral reef', with living coral below the low-water mark, shoaling 6–8 feet below. The coral reserves were once so vast they were described as 'inexhaustible'.

The island is known to be a sanctuary for birds, and hunting was prohibited as early as 1906. Notable species of the island include the eastern great egret, white-bellied sea-eagle, grey-tailed tattler, little tern, grey plover and southern giant petrel. The endangered Far Eastern curlew is also found on the island. Loggerhead sea turtles, dolphins, sharks and humpback whales can be seen around the island, as across the bay at large.

Mud Island is part of the Moreton Bay Ramsar site, which is designated as a wetland region of international importance. Intertidal areas like the island are critical for the conservation of waterbirds and vulnerable mangrove ecosystems, in addition to providing important nursery conditions for fish and crustaceans. It has long been regarded as a good fishing spot, particularly of Australasian snapper. The island was gazetted as a conservation park in 2000 under the Nature Conservation Act 1992 (Qld).

The island's geomorphology has been fundamentally altered by decades of coral dredging. Because so much of the subsurface reef has been removed, the island is surrounded by deeper water, leaving it exposed to stronger waves, and thus greater erosion. These waves also deposit coral rubble from the seafloor as 'ridges' surrounding much of the island. The coral ridges have been found to block intertidal drainage, resulting in mangrove mortality through ponding of water.

Fringe mangroves are especially vulnerable to smothering and abrasion as the result of these factors, and seaward areas have suffered significant erosion. The greater depth of the seafloor, along with significantly greater rates of fine sedimentation in the bay water, both the result of dredging and mangrove habitat erosion, have irreversibly damaged the ability of corals, algae and seagrasses to grow around Mud Island. Substantial coral rubble remains on the seafloor, nearly 30 years after the conclusion of dredging.

The tidal flux subjects the island and the surrounding reef to significant amounts of pollution and human refuse, in addition to marine debris like crab pots and netting. Cleaning is not undertaken as the island is very rarely visited.

== History ==
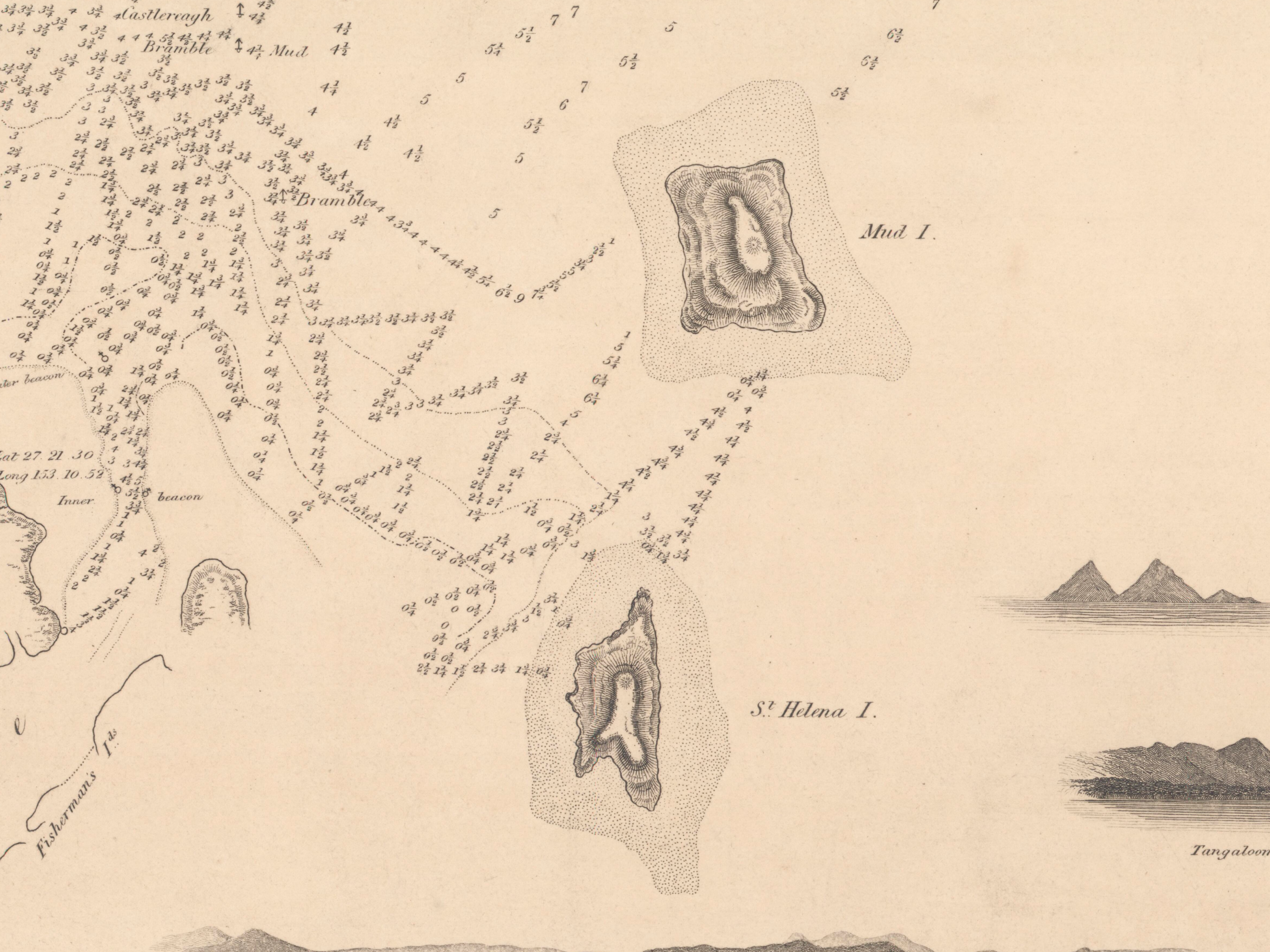
Mud Island and St Helena Island on an 1846 survey of Moreton Bay.

=== Indigenous history ===
Moreton Bay was historically occupied by the Quandamooka people, who lived around the bay and its islands. The Quandamooka called Mud Island "Bungumba", which may mean 'plenty mud'. The name 'Mud Island' likely originated with convicts around 1828, describing the muddy appearance of the island from afar. Mud Island features in an Indigenous story relayed by Thomas Petrie to his daughter Constance Campbell Petrie, of a bittern which captures a dugong and travels up the islands of the bay, from South Stradbroke to Russell Island, Coochiemudlo, Peel, Green Island, St Helena and finally to Mud Island, which is 'the last island'.

=== Settlement of Brisbane and Moreton Bay ===
In the 1850s, the water off Mud Island was regarded as the best point of anchorage for large ocean vessels approaching the settlement of Brisbane, as the shallow water at the mouth of the Brisbane River, and at Eagle Farm, prevented ships from going further upstream. Due to this adjacency, Mud Island became a site where passengers who had died en route to Brisbane were buried, including emigrants and labourers.

Unidentified skeletons have been found numerous times on the island. This includes one found in 1897, which was speculatively attributed to a victim of the capsize of the ferry Pearl, or of the 1893 Brisbane floods. Another, discovered by a fisherman in April 1988, was found in a wooden coffin, and remains unexplained.

The Queensland Home Department considered Mud Island as a possible site for a 'leper station' in 1906, but found it to be too small and inaccessible. Peel Island, which was closer to the mainland, was chosen, and became a lazaret for the detention and treatment of those suffering from Hansen's Disease.

=== Coral dredging ===
From 1932 to 1997, the Queensland Cement and Lime Company (QCL) operated dredges at Mud Island, mining coral for use in the manufacturing process of Portland cement. Coral contains limestone, which is a major component of the milled cement product. QCL obtained an exclusive license to the island's material after Henry Richards of the University of Queensland gave notice of the large quantity of coralline material, which was estimated to be over 50 million tons, and accumulating at "quite a fair rate".

Richards was a founder of the Great Barrier Reef Committee, which was established to counteract the "exploitation of the economic wealth of the Great Barrier Reef by foreigners". Richards wanted to investigate Darwin's ideas of coral reefs, but had little mind to the long-term sustainability of reef habitats, believing that the 'wandering and foreign population' should be replaced by 'resident European fishermen'. His interests, originally of marine life 'assets', turned to investigation of basaltic foundations, sedimentary basins, oil-bearing deposits and lime for cement manufacture.

It was in this capacity that he advised industrial interests, such as QCL, for Australian economic benefit. QCL had previously obtained limestone from Gore, but the significant distance to the factory at Darra, in concert with high freight rates by rail drove the company to seek an alternative. Mud Island, which is located close to the mouth of the Brisbane River, was an attractive option, especially following Richards' testimony. Coral would be extracted from water around the island by dredge, then shipped to Oxley, where it could then be trucked a short distance to the factory at Darra.

Operations expanded over the course of the 1930s, with 170 tons of coralline material being extracted from the island in 1932 alone. In addition to use of the dredge and carrier ship Kyogle, the Crocodile was hired as construction of the Story Bridge increased the demand for concrete in 1935. Between 1929 and 1937, approximately 8 million bags of coral reportedly were extracted from the island to be manufactured into cement. During World War II and thereafter, the demand for cement rose rapidly following an explosion in housing construction, and more than 1.5 million tons of coral were lifted from around Mud Island between 1938 and 1947.

In January 1948, an engineer working on the Grazier, a QCL-contracted steamer, drowned after the boat capsized in the bay. The 207-ton steamer was half-laden with coral at the time, and was struck by two large waves in otherwise normal conditions. A Harbours and Marine inquiry found no wrongdoing, and much of the ship was salvaged in 1949. Remnants of the wooden wreck reportedly remained as recently as 1997, but have since disappeared.

Beginning in 1947, despite the enormous reserves available to the company within the area circumscribed by the original license, QCL sought to expand their rights to the island. The company's original license, granted in 1932, allowed exclusive use of the island within the area encompassed by a 10-foot contour, the line along the seabed where the water was 10 feet deep at low tide. QCL had little respect for this boundary, and the majority of its dredging activity prior to 1948 took place outside the 10-foot contour. Despite this contravention, in 1956, the Queensland government removed the fourteen-year limit of the lease imposed by the Fish and Oyster Acts, and expanded the available dredging area to a 25-foot contour. By this time, QCL had bought and converted a LST 3022 tank landing ship into a 'mighty' 10'000 ton suction dredge called 'the Coral'.

In concert with the carrier Cementco, which transported the coral to Oxley, QCL was able to continue to increase its extraction capacity. By the 1990s, QCL had dredged and removed 74% of the open reef flat around Mud Island, with just a small section in the southwest remaining. The material removed over the course of the mining operation constituted more than half of the island and its reef, originally was as large as 12 km^{2}, reduced today to 4.24 km^{2}. By the time operations ceased in 1997, approximately 39 million tonnes of coral had been removed from Moreton Bay at large by the company.

In 1997, the Queensland Government decided not to extend or grant further license to dredge coral from the bay, following pressure from community groups such as the Rivermouth Action Group. In 1989, QCL had won extended rights over St Helena, Green Island, and Empire Point, prompting community outrage over the 'substantial and irreversible' environmental damage caused, and threatened, by the company. In response, the Goss government promised in 1995 that the QCL Darra factory would be "closed as soon as practicable", and dredging licenses in Moreton Bay were not renewed. In 2000, the island was designated as a conservation park.
