= HMAS LST 3022 =

1945 LST(3)-class tank landing ship

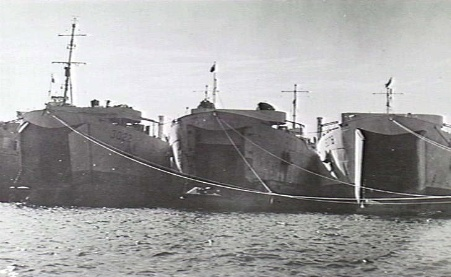
- HMAS LST 3022 (at left) in 1946

History

United Kingdom/Australia
- Builder: Lithgows, Port Glasgow
- Launched: 26 January 1945
- Commissioned: 1 July 1946 (into RAN)
- Decommissioned: 1946
- Renamed: 1 July 1946 (to HMAS LST 3022); September 1954 (to Coral)
- Fate: Converted to dredge Coral

General characteristics
- Class & type: Landing Ship Tank Mark 3
- Displacement: 2,140 tonnes (2,110 long tons; 2,360 short tons) light; 3,117 tonnes (3,068 long tons; 3,436 short tons) beaching
- Length: 345 ft (105 m) overall
- Beam: 55 ft 3 in (16.84 m)
- Draught: 13 ft 1 in (3.99 m)
- Propulsion: Triple expansion engine, 5,500 hp (4,100 kW), two propellers
- Speed: 13 knots (24 km/h; 15 mph)
- Range: 10,000 nautical miles (19,000 km; 12,000 mi) at 10 knots (19 km/h; 12 mph)
- Capacity: 18 40-ton tanks, 27 trucks, and 7 LCMs
- Troops: 168 troops
- Complement: 104
- Armament: 4 × 40 mm Bofors (two twin mounts); 6 × 20 mm Oerlikons (two twin, two single mounts)

HMAS LST 3022 was a Mark 3 Landing Ship Tank (LST) operated by the Royal Navy (as HMS LST 3022) during World War II, and the Royal Australian Navy (RAN) from 1946 until 1954.

The vessel was built by Lithgows at their shipyard in Port Glasgow, Scotland, and was launched on 26 January 1945. The Mark 3 LST had a light load displacement of 2,140 tonnes (2,110 long tons; 2,360 short tons), with a maximum beachable displacement of 3,117 tonnes (3,068 long tons; 3,436 short tons) beaching. They were 345 feet (105 m) in length overall, with a beam of 55 feet 3 inches (16.84 m), and a maximum draught of 13 feet 1 inch (3.99 m) at the stern. Propulsion was provided by triple expansion engines, which delivered 5,500 horsepower (4,100 kW) to the two propellers. Maximum speed was 13 knots (24 km/h; 15 mph), with a range of 10,000 nautical miles (19,000 km; 12,000 mi) at 10 knots (19 km/h; 12 mph). The LCTs had a ship's company of 104, and could carry a maximum load of 168 troops, eighteen 40-ton tanks, 27 trucks, and seven Landing Craft Mechanized. In RAN service, LST 3022 was armed with four 40 mm Bofors in two twin mounts and six 20 mm Oerlikons in two twin and two single mounts.

LST 3022 operated with the Royal Navy during World War II. In 1946, LST 3022 and five other Mark 3 LSTs were loaned to the RAN. They were all commissioned into RAN service on 1 July 1946. LST 3022 was placed in reserve before the end of the year, and was not recommissioned.

LST 3022 was sold to R.R. Coote for disposal on 4 June 1950. The vessel was purchased by the Queensland Cement and Lime Company. In September 1954, was converted into a dredge, and renamed Coral. In this role she was operated alongside the former Australian Army vessel Crusader, which had also been purchased by the Queensland Cement and Lime Company, converted to a coral barge and renamed Cementco.
