= MS Empress of Australia =

Ferry operated by the Australian National Line

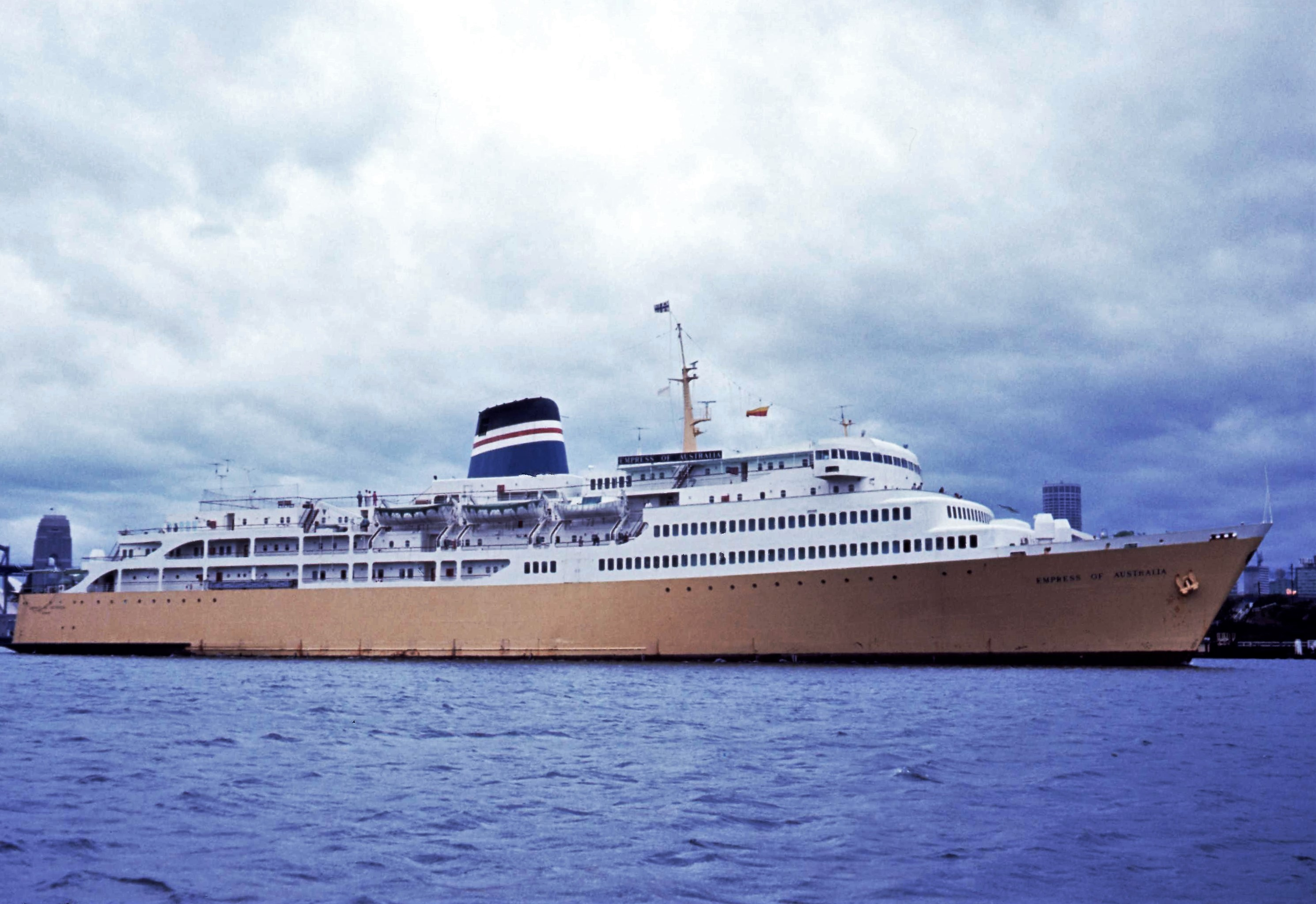
- Empress of Australia on Sydney Harbour in March 1968

History

Australia
- Name: Empress of Australia
- Operator: Australian National Line
- Builder: Cockatoo Docks & Engineering Company, Sydney
- Cost: $2.6 million
- Yard number: 220
- Laid down: 11 September 1962
- Launched: 18 January 1964
- Acquired: 8 January 1965
- Identification: IMO number: 6405434
- Fate: Sold, 1985; Sank after collision, 23 August 1992

General characteristics (as built)
- Type: Ro-Ro passenger ferry
- Tonnage: 12,037 GRT
- Length: 443 ft (135 m)
- Beam: 40 ft (12 m)
- Draught: 20 ft (240 in)
- Propulsion: MAN diesel engines, 2 shafts, bow thruster
- Speed: 17 knots (31 km/h; 20 mph)
- Capacity: 250 passengers; 91 cars

Empress of Australia was a ferry operated by the Australian National Line. Ordered in 1962 by the Australian National Line and launched by Cockatoo Docks & Engineering Company on 18 January 1964, Empress of Australia was the largest passenger ferry built in the world at the time.

From the time of her 16 January 1965 maiden voyage, the ship could carry up to 250 passengers in cabins, 91 cars, 16 trucks, and 160 intermodal containers. The ferry made three runs from Sydney to Tasmania every fortnight until 1972; one each to Hobart, Bell Bay and Burnie.

In 1972, the ship was transferred to the Melbourne to Tasmania route, replacing the Princess of Tasmania. She was modified at the State Dockyard: the installation of 190 reclining seats in the original lounge increased her passenger capacity to 440, and a deck was added at the aft end. Empress of Australia began sailing between Melbourne and Devonport on 28 June 1972, and continued making Bass Strait crossings until 1986.

Empress of Australia was replaced in 1986 by the Abel Tasman, also a car ferry, then renamed as Empress was sold to Cypriot owners and heavily refitted and converted into a cruise ship, in 1991 offered Mexican Riviera Cruises from San Diego, California to Acapulco, Guerrero, Mexico, may be under Starlite Cruises managing, but these trips were unsuccessful and lasted only six months, she may be sold to an Asian Company in Singapore, then she was renamed Royal Pacific and began operations there, mainly for gambling-casino business.

== Sinking ==
On 22 August 1992, the Royal Pacific departed from Singapore for a three-day, two night cruise off the coast of Malaysia and Thailand. In the evening of 23 August 1992, she was rammed by the Taiwanese fishing vessel Terfu 51 in the Straits of Malacca after the Tefru misjudged the distance needed to cross the path of the Pacific. The collision caused a six-foot hole beneath the water line of the hull. The ship remained above water for about two hours after the collision before sinking around 3 a.m.

At the time of sinking, she was carrying 516 people, consisting of 337 passengers and 179 crew. A majority of passengers were from Singapore, with smaller numbers from Britain, Australia, India, United States, Indonesia, Germany, Taiwan, and Canada. 193 passengers were rescued by the Japanese ship Marissa, while most others were picked up by the Greek ship Chapai. The collision resulted in 30 deaths, with most attributed to the crew's choice to abandon ship first. At the time of the collision the Royal Pacific was piloted by captain Anastasios Papagiannis.
