= Australian National Line =

Australian shipping line

- Industry: Maritime transport
- Founded: 1 October 1956
- Headquarters: Melbourne, Australia
- Parent: CMA CGM
- Website: www.anl.com.au

Australian National Line (ANL) is a coastal shipping line established by the Government of Australia in 1956. It was sold in 1998 to CMA CGM.

== History ==
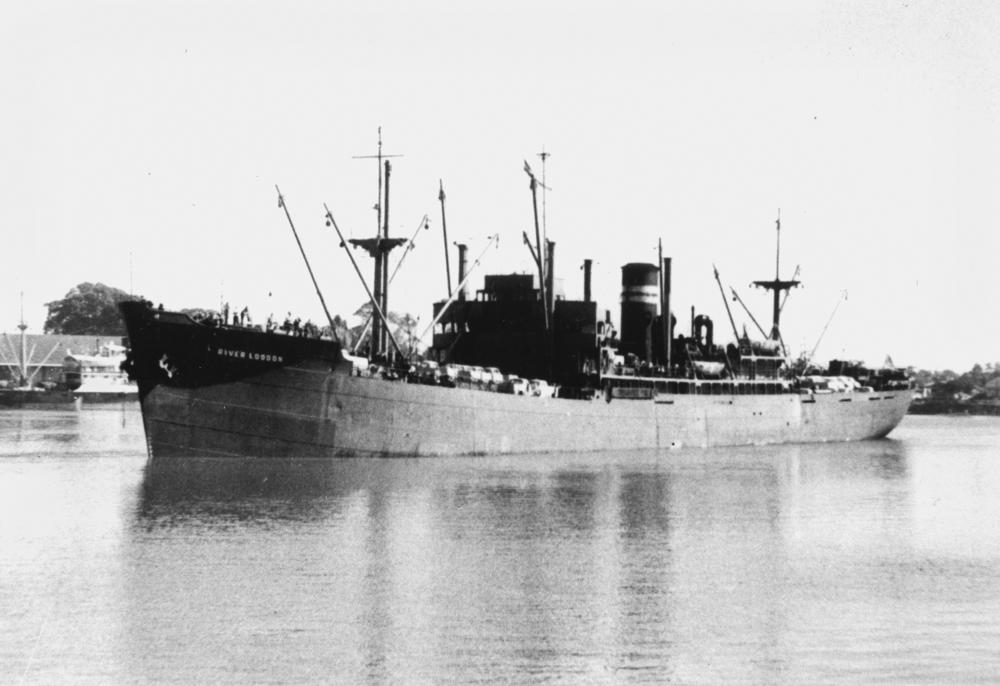
In 1957 the Australian Coastal Shipping Commission took over all 13 of the "A"-class cargo steamships that had been built for the Australian Government in the 1940s. This is River Loddon, which remained in the fleet until 1963.

Australian National Line was formed on 1 October 1956 as the Australian Coastal Shipping Commission with the passing of the Australian Coastal Shipping Commission Act. The organisation took about forty ships previously operated by the Australian Shipping Board, which had been formed in 1946 by the federal government.

In March 1969, ANL commenced operating services to Japan in a joint venture with K Line.

In 1974, the Australian Coastal Shipping Commission was renamed the Australian Shipping Commission in recognition of its international role, it continued to trade as ANL.

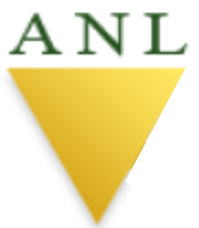
Previous logo

=== Privatisation ===
ANL was converted into a public company in 1989 via the ANL (Conversion into Public Company) Act 1988, although it remained government-owned. In 1991, the Hawke government announced its intention to privatise ANL following poor financial performance. The Keating government passed the ANL Guarantee Act 1994 and commenced a restructuring of ANL in 1995 to prepare it for sale. A deal to sell it to P&O collapsed after the Maritime Union of Australia threatened a national strike in the lead up to the 1996 Australian federal election.

In December 1998, the Howard government sold ANL's liner shipping business to CMA CGM with two ships: Australian Endeavour and Australian Enterprise. In May 1999, the bulk shipping business was sold to Auscan Self-Unloaders, a subsidiary of Canada Steamship Lines, with two ships: River Torrens and River Yarra.

The residual assets of four leased ships on long-term sub-charter; alumina carriers River Boyne and River Embley and Bass Strait vessels Searoad Tamar and Searoad Mersey, were placed in the custody of the Australian River Company Limited. Searoad Tamar and Searoad Mersey were sold in June and September 2005 to their charterer, Patrick Shipping, while River Embley and River Boyne were sold to Singapore for scrap in May and August 2012. The Australian River Company Limited was wound up in 2015.

== Services ==
=== Historical ===
The company entered the ferry business in 1959, when Tasmanian Steamers announced that it would be withdrawing from the Bass Strait. Its ship the Taroona was becoming totally inadequate, only being able to carry 30 cars, which had to be lifted aboard. As no replacement was available, the federal government decided that the Australian National Line should take over, and it would be provided with a subsidy with an order placed with the State Dockyard, Newcastle. The new ship was named Princess of Tasmania, was the first roll on/roll off ferry in the southern hemisphere and the largest. She entered the Melbourne to Devonport route on 23 September 1959. The new ship and route were such a success for the ANL ordered a cargo only ship, to be named Bass Trader.

With the passenger numbers going so well on the Princess of Tasmania and cargo going very well also, ANL decided that a regular passenger service from Sydney to Hobart should be re-established. An order was placed with Cockatoo Docks & Engineering Company. The new ship was christened Empress of Australia on 18 January 1964. Empress of Australia made her maiden voyage from Sydney to Hobart on 16 January 1965. The Empress of Australia operated from Sydney to Hobart and Sydney to Bell Bay/Burnie and back.

With the Princess of Tasmania going so well out of Melbourne, there needed to be more capacity on the route, so ANL ordered a new ship to be built at the State Dockyard. The new ship would be bigger, with smaller passenger capacity but more cargo space, an early example of the Ro/Pax concept. The new ship was launched on 17 February 1969 as the Australian Trader. On 24 June 1969, Australian Trader set out on her maiden voyage to Devonport. The new ship operated a rotation between Bell Bay, Devonport and Burnie.

On 27 June 1972 Princess of Tasmania left Devonport for the final time. ANL sold her to Bahamarine, Nassau and she left Australia on 7 October 1972. When the Princess of Tasmania left the route the Australian Trader swapped with her, and Empress of Australia replaced the Princess of Tasmania on the Melbourne to Devonport route.

ANL were involved in the 1975 Tasman Bridge disaster in Hobart, Tasmania, as the owner/operator of the Lake Illawarra, the bulk carrier which collided with the bridge, and consequently sank.

ANL announced that Australian Trader would be withdrawn from service, being replaced by a new freight only ship named Bass Trader.

On the final arrival of the Australian Trader in Bell Bay the crew went on strike. The ship remained idle there for two months. Finally on 24 September 1976 they gave up and she sailed to Sydney, laid-up and was offered for sale. The sale was completed on 16 January 1977 to the Royal Australian Navy as a training ship.

In 1983 the government of Tasmania were seeking from the federal government funds to charter a supplementary ship, being either Scotia Prince, St Patrick II, Stena Baltica or Odysseus Elytis. This was rejected.

In 1984 ANL announced that it would not be continuing in the ferry business, and the Empress of Australia would be withdrawn in 1985 and sold. This was then put into the hands of the Tasmanian Government which subsequently formed the TT-Line with the federal government agreeing to buy a ship.

The ceasing of the ANL's involvement in the passenger trade allowed it to concentrate solely on bulk freight and cargo. In December 1998, CMA CGM bought ANL's container shipping business and trading name from the federal government.

Commercially, ANL still operates the more traditional north–south directional trades, plus nearly 20 relatively new east–west directional trades riding on the services of CMA CGM.

== Fleet summary ==
This is a list of ships owned or operated by ANL between its formation in 1956 and privatisation in 1998.

Name	Type	Entered ANL service	Left ANL service	Disposition	Fate
Baralga	General cargo	February 1957	1972	Sold to Nilmore	Scrapped 1980
Bilkurra	General cargo	February 1957	1969	Sold to Malaysian International Shipping	Scrapped 1974
Binburra	General cargo	February 1957	1969	Sold to Malaysian International Shipping	Scrapped 1974
Boonaroo	General cargo	March 1957	January 1971	Sold to Collin Navigation Co	Scrapped 1985
Bulwarra	General cargo	March 1958	January 1971	Sold to Collin Navigation Co	Ran aground off Keelung and broke apart on 22 October 1971, total loss
Dalby	General cargo	January 1958	October 1969	Sold to Cronulla Cia Nav	Ran aground off Keelung on 14 November 1971, abandoned as total loss
Dandenong	General cargo	1957	1960	Sold to Jones Brothers Coal	Scrapped 1971
Daylesford	General cargo	1957	1960	Sold to Fung Shing Navigation Co	Scrapped 1972
Delungra	General cargo	November 1957	April 1960	Sold to H & S Credits	Scrapped 1974
Denman	General cargo	March 1957	1965	Sold to Eddie Steamships (Philippines)	Scrapped 1970
Dubbo	General cargo	March 1957	May 1965	Sold to Australia Pacific Co (Hong Kong)	Scrapped 1969
Edenhope	General cargo	February 1957	October 1965	Sold to Bougainville Trading Co	Scrapped 1979
Elmore	General cargo	February 1957	January 1965	Sold to John Burke	Scrapped 1987
Enfield	General cargo	February 1957	January 1965	Sold to Legaspi Oil Co	Deregistered 2008 in Manila, Philippines. Still afloat.
Eugowra	General cargo	February 1957	June 1969	Sold to Pacific Islands Shipping Co	Scrapped 1974
Euroa	General cargo	February 1957	March 1969	Sold to Keith Hollands Shipping Co	Scrapped 1980
Inyula	Bulk carrier	February 1957	September 1975	Sold to Octamaris Maritime Corporation	Sank in the Black Sea December 1977 in bad weather
Lake Barrine	Bulk carrier	February 1957	October 1975	Sold to Drillships	Scrapped 1982
Lake Eyre	Bulk carrier	February 1957	February 1973	Sold to Century Shipping Lines (Hong Kong)	Scrapped 1975
Nilpina	General cargo	February 1957	June 1971	Sold to Simanggang Sawmill Co	Sank off Little Andaman Island on 22 June 1985.
Noongah	General cargo	February 1957	25 August 1969	-	Sank off Smoky Cape in heavy seas with the loss of 21 crew
Ransdorp	Tanker	March 1957	May 1958	Sold to Dent & Graham	Sank in the Tasman Sea on 18 March 1961
River Burdekin	General cargo	March 1957	1959	Sold to Indonesian government	Scrapped 1971
River Burnett	General cargo	March 1957	April 1965	Sold to Australine Shipping Co	Scrapped 1973
River Clarence	General cargo	March 1957	1960	Sold to World-Wide SS Co	Scrapped 1968
River Derwent	General cargo	January 1957	April 1959	Interstate Steamships	Ran aground during Typhoon Wanda, refloated and scrapped 1962
River Fitzroy	General cargo	March 1957	March 1963	Sold to Amakasu Sangyo Kisen K K	Scrapped March 1963
River Glenelg	General cargo	March 1957	October 1960	Sold to Hang Fung Shipping & Trading Co	Scrapped January 1963
River Hunter	General cargo	February 1957	July 1959	Sold to Albert Sims	Scrapped 1960
River Loddon	General cargo	March 1957	March 1963	Sold to Amakasu Sangyo Kisen K K	Scrapped March 1963
River Mitta	General cargo	March 1957	July 1959	Sold to Hang Fung Shipping & Trading Co	Scrapped 1959
River Murchison	General cargo	February 1957	February 1963	Sold to Amakasu Sangyo Kisen K K	Scrapped March 1963
River Murray	General cargo	March 1957	August 1959	Sold to Albert Sims	Scrapped 1959
River Murrumbidgee	General cargo	March 1957	January 1963	Sold to Amakasu Sangyo Kisen K K	Scrapped March 1963
River Norman	General cargo	February 1957	1959	Sold to Wallem & Co	Ran aground during Typhoon Wanda, refloated and scrapped 1962
Talinga	Bulk carrier	February 1957	July 1970	Sold to Elios Compania Navigation	Ran aground during Typhoon Rose, refloated and scrapped 1972
Timbarra	Bulk carrier	February 1957	January 1969	Sold to Montauk Maritime	Scrapped 1973
Tyalla	Bulk carrier	March 1957	May 1957	Sold to Cambray Prince Steamship Co	Formerly repair ship HMS Dullisk Cove. Scrapped 1962
Wangara	General cargo	March 1957	October 1966	Sold to Western Australian Coastal Shipping Commission	Comveryed to a barge 1983
Windarra	General cargo	April 1957	October 1970	Sold to Collin Navigation Co	Scrapped 1980
Yanderra	Bulk carrier	February 1957	November 1970	Sold to Collin Navigation Co	Scrapped 1976
Yarrunga	Bulk carrier	February 1957	December 1971	Sold to Corona Navigation Co	Sank in the Persian Gulf 4 May 1975 after cargo caught fire
Iranda	Bulk carrier	1957	August 1977	Sold to Jollyboat	Scrapped 1982
North Esk	General cargo	1957	June 1979	Sold to West Pacific Shipping	Scrapped 1984
Lake Boga	Bulk carrier	1957	29 March 1978	Sold to International Activity Shipping & Investment Co	Scrapped 1984
Lake Boga	Bulk carrier	1957	January 1978	Sold to Tien Tai Shipping Co	Scrapped May 1978
Illowra	Bulk carrier	1957	June 1970	Sold to Athenmar Shipping Co	Scrapped 1982
Lake Illawarra	Bulk carrier	1958	5 January 1975	-	Sank after colliding with the Tasman Bridge
Lake Colac	General cargo	1958	1978	Sold to Maliac Shipping Corporation	Scrapped 1979
Lake Macquarie	Bulk carrier	1958	January 1979	Sold to Project and Services	Scrapped 1982
South Esk	General cargo	1959	December 1972	Sold to Eastern Shipping Lines	Sank in the South China Sea on 16 February 1980
Lake Macquarie	Bulk carrier	1959	June 1979	Sold to Bluewater Bay Maritime	Scrapped 1981
Princess of Tasmania	Passenger and roll-on/roll-off	September 1959	December 1972	Sold to Bahamarine	Scrapped 2005
Mount Keira	Ore carrier	1960	June 1976	Sold to Agile Shipping Co	Scrapped 1983
Mount Kembla	Ore carrier	1960	June 1973	Sold to Drillships	Scrapped 1988
Bass Trader (1st)	Roll-on/roll-off	1961	April 1975	Sold to Halley Enterprise Shipping Co, Panama as Halley	Scrapped 1984
Merino	General cargo	October 1963	December 1964	Sold to Carpentaria Holdings	Scuttled in the Arafura Sea on 17 December 1986
Jeparit	General and bulk cargo	1964	September 1979	Sold to Massis Charity Shipping Co	Scrapped 1993
Musgrave Range	Ore carrier	November 1964	June 1977	Sold to Zea Shipping Co	Scrapped 1983
Empress of Australia	Passenger and roll-on/roll-off	January 1965	1985	Sold to Sun Cruises Maritime	Sank in the Strait of Malacca on 23 August 1992
Darling River	Bulk carrier	1966	February 1979	Sold to Malcome Collins	Scrapped June 1979
Australian Trader (1st)	Passenger and roll-on/roll-off	1969	January 1977	Sold to the Royal Australian Navy	Scrapped 2004
Australian Enterprise (1st)	Container and roll-on/roll-off	1969	1 January 1986	-	Scrapped 1986
Australian Endeavour (1st)	Container	1969	1 June 1985	-	Scrapped 1985
Brisbane Trader	Container and roll-on/roll-off	1969	10 December 1986	Sold to Mastrogiorgis Shipping Co	Scrapped 2010
Sydney Trader	Container and roll-on/roll-off	1969	1984	-	Scrapped 1984
Tolga	Bulk carrier	October 1969 (leased)	1983	Returned to Arctic Shipping Co	Scrapped 1994
Yarra River	Bulk carrier	1970	1982	-	Scrapped 1982
Townsville Trader	Container and roll-on/roll-off	1970	November 1984	-	Scrapped 1984
Darwin Trader	Container and bulk carrier	1970	1998	-	Still in service
Echuca	Container	1971	July 1976	Sold to Wan Hai Steamship Co	Still in service
Allunga	Container and roll-on/roll-off	1971	1986	-	Scrapped 1986
Mount Newman	Bulk carrier	1973 (chartered)	1981	Returned to Pacific Maritime Services	Scrapped 1996
Alnwick Castle	Bulk carrier	1974 (leased)	June 1981	Returned to Ben Line	Scrapped 1996
Tambo River	Bulk carrier	1972 (chartered)	September 1979	Returned to Northern Bulk Carriers	Scrapped 1998
MSC Australian Exporter	Container	July 1972 (leased)	1990	Returned to Mediterranean Shipping Co	Scrapped 1999
Lysaght Endeavour	Roll-on/roll-off	1973	10 June 1987	-	Scrapped 1987
Lysaght Enterprise	Roll-on/roll-off	1973	1987	-	Scrapped February 1987
Australian Emblem	Container and roll-on/roll-off	1974(leased)	17 April 1988	Returned to Kawasaki Heavy Industries	Scrapped 1997
Melbourne Trader	Roll-on/roll-off	January 1975	1988	Sold to Bulk Enterprise	Still in service
MSC Australian Explorer	Container	April 1975	1986	-	Scrapped 1986
Stirling Range	Bulk carrier	April 1975	March 1980	Sold to Antigoni Shipping Co	Sunk 21 November 1983 in the Iran–Iraq War
Australian Escort	Container and roll-on/roll-off	January 1976	1989	-	Renamed Anro Melbourne
Bass Trader (2nd)	Roll-on/roll-off	1976	1997	Sold to Strintzis Lines	Still in service
Australian Pioneer	Bulk carrier	August 1976	1986	Sold to Shanghai Ocean Shipping Co	Still in service
Australian Prospector	Bulk carrier	December 1976	July 1979	Sold to Trikappa	Scrapped 1999
Australian Venture	Container	1976	December 1996	Sold to Lavicer Investments Corp	Scrapped 2006
Anro Australia	Container	February 1977	1997	Sold to Ruby Enterprises	Scrapped June 1997
Flinders Range	Bulk carrier	1977	2 January 1987	Sold to China Shipping Group	Still in service
Australian Purpose	Bulk carrier	December 1977	June 1979	Sold to Lavicer Investments Corp	Scrapped 2006
Lake Barrine	Bulk carrier	1978	1986	Sold to Societe Mo Car	Still in service
Lake Eildon	Bulk carrier	1978	1985	Sold to Queensland Lime & Cement	Scrapped 2008
Lake Eyre	Bulk carrier	1978	1984	Sold to Julia Shipping	Still in service
Lake Hume	Bulk carrier	January 1979	1986	Sold to Clarry Shipping	Still in service
Australian Progress	Bulk carrier	February 1979	1991	Sold to Treasure Sea Shipping	Scrapped 2002
Selwyn Range	Bulk carrier	July 1979	1990	Sold to CSL Pacific	Still in service
Cape Hawke	Bulk carrier	1981 (leased)	December 1986	Returned to British Phosphate Commission	Scrapped 1987
Baron Murray	Bulk carrier	August 1981 (leased)	1987	Returned to Otway Shipping Co	Scrapped 2003
Cape Otway	Bulk carrier	August 1981 (leased)	1987	Returned to British Phosphate Commission	Scrapped 2008
River Boyne	Ore carrier	1982	-	-	Still in service
River Embley	Ore carrier	1983	-	-	Still in service
River Yarra	Ore carrier	1984	2002	Sold to Canada Steamship Lines	Still in service
Australian Trader (2nd)	Container	1 February 1985	19 January 1997	Sold to Hub Line	Still in service
Australian Advance	Container	1986 (leased)	1988	Returned to United Arab Shipping Co	Still in service
Tranztas Trader	General cargo	1989	1998	Sold to Littleton Services	Sank off Vietnam on 16 December 2010
Anro Melbourne	Container and roll-on/roll-off	1989	1992	Sold to Plixia Trading	Scrapped 1998
Australian Searoad	Roll-on/roll-off	1989	1994	Returned to Pacific Intercontinental Co	Still in service
Australian Express	General cargo	6 September 1989 (leased)	3 February 1990	Returned to Nanyuan Shipping	Still in service
Australian Endeavour (2nd)	Container	1991	-	-	Still in service as ANL Australia
Australian Endurance	Container	1991	1996	Sold to Koala Shipping	Still in service
Australian Enterprise (2nd)	Container	1997	-	-	Still in service as ANL Explorer

== See also ==
- Commonwealth Line, another government-owned shipping company in operation between 1916 and 1928
