= Clive Steele =

Australian general (1892–1955)

Sir Clive Selwyn Steele
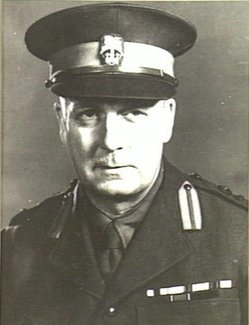
- Brigadier Clive Steele in May 1940
- Born: 30 September 1892; Canterbury, Victoria
- Died: 5 August 1955 (aged 62); Heidelberg, Victoria
- Military career
- Allegiance: Australia
- Branch: Australian Army
- Service years: 1912–1946
- Rank: Major General
- Commands: 6th Divisional Engineers (1939–40); 14th Battalion (1933–39); 4th Divisional Engineers (1926–31)
- Conflicts: First World War; Second World War
- Awards: Knight Commander of the Order of the British Empire; Distinguished Service Order; Military Cross; Colonial Auxiliary Forces Officers' Decoration; Mentioned in Despatches (2); War Cross (Greece)

Major General Sir Clive Selwyn Steele, KBE, DSO, MC, VD (30 September 1892 – 5 August 1955) was an engineer and a senior officer of the Australian Army who served in both the First and Second World Wars. He was instrumental in the expansion of the Royal Australian Engineers (RAE) in preparation for the war against Japan.

== Early life ==
Born on 30 September 1892 at Canterbury, Melbourne, Clive Steele was the son of Herbert Selwyn Steele and Alice Lydia née Sinclair. He was educated at Scotch College (prefect and captain of boats, 1910), and the University of Melbourne (B.C.E. 1919). He joined the Militia in 1912.

== First World War ==
Appointed as a second lieutenant in the Royal Australian Engineers (RAE), Australian Imperial Force on 8 October 1915, he sailed for Egypt in November with the 5th Field Company. He arrived on the Western Front in March 1916 and was promoted to captain in September. While on recreation leave, he married Amie Osland Bilson on 6 January 1917 at West Brompton, London. During actions around Péronne, France in August 1918, he commanded a unit undertaking repairs to bridges while under artillery and machine-gun fire. On 31 August he undertook reconnaissance 200 yards (180 m) in front of the Australian lines, providing details of the state of bridges across the River Somme and the Somme Canal. For this action he was awarded the Military Cross, the citation for which reads:

For conspicuous gallantry, initiative, and devotion on the 31st August, 1918, at Peronne, when he made the most daring and valuable reconnaissance regardless of heavy shelling, to ascertain the condition of the bridge across the Somme River and Canal and arrange for the repairs. He organised parties and carried out these repairs, which enabled communication across the river and canal to be successfully established. Throughout the operations he did splendid work under most trying conditions.

Steele was promoted to major in October. He returned to Australia, and was discharged on 1 August 1919.

== Interwar ==
Finishing his engineering degree at Melbourne University in 1919, he gained employment with Australian Reinforced Concrete & Engineering Co. until 1921 and then with James Hardie & Co. Pty Ltd from 1921 to 1923. Setting up private practice in 1924 as a consulting engineer, he designed and supervised structural works including the State Savings Bank of Victoria building in Melbourne, the members' stand at Flemington Racecourse, the National Mutual Life Association of Australasia Ltd building in Brisbane, Her Majesty's Theatre, Sydney and the Melbourne Town Hall. From 1919, he continued serving in the Militia. In 1926, he was promoted to lieutenant colonel and appointed to command the 4th Divisional Engineers (1926–1931) and the 14th Battalion (1933–1939).

== Second World War ==
With the outbreak of the Second World War, Steele was seconded to the Second Australian Imperial Force on 13 October 1939 as the commander of the 6th Divisional Engineers. He was promoted to temporary brigadier and appointed chief engineer of I Corps in April 1940. He sailed for the Middle East in September and during the Greek campaign in April 1941, he was chief engineer of the Anzac Corps. During the withdrawal at Farsala on 18 April, despite attacks by German aircraft, he organised the filling of a bomb crater in the road which was impeding the withdrawal of the allied forces. He was awarded the Distinguished Service Order and the Greek War Cross, and was twice Mentioned in dispatches for his service in the Middle East.

Transported to Java, Netherlands East Indies in January 1942, he was then sent to Sumatra on 14 February, where he helped organise the evacuation of Allied troops from Oosthaven. He returned to Australia in March, and in April was promoted to temporary major general and appointed engineer-in-chief at Land Headquarters, Melbourne.

In preparation for the war against Japan, he established the RAE Training Centre at Kapooka, New South Wales and increased the size of the School of Military Engineering at Liverpool, which trained sappers who disarmed mines, demolished obstacles, provided water supplies and other services to military camps, cut and milled timber, built huts, roads, bridges, railways, airfields and wharves, and operated the army's water-transport vessels. With the reorganisation of Land Headquarters in October 1943, fortifications, works, engineer stores and transport were added to Steele's responsibilities. During 1944 or 1945 he personally designed the heavy lift ship Crusader. On 12 March 1946 he transferred to the Reserve of Officers.

== Later life ==
Steele had been awarded the W. C. Kernot medal for 1944 by the University of Melbourne. He was active in the Institution of Engineers, Australia and was appointed Knight Commander of the Order of the British Empire (KBE) in 1953.

He died of myocardial infarction on 5 August 1955 at the Repatriation General Hospital, Heidelberg and was cremated. He was survived by his wife; the couple were childless. In recognition of his contributions, Steele Barracks, the current home to the School of Military Engineering, was named in his honour.
