= Queensland Cement and Lime Company =

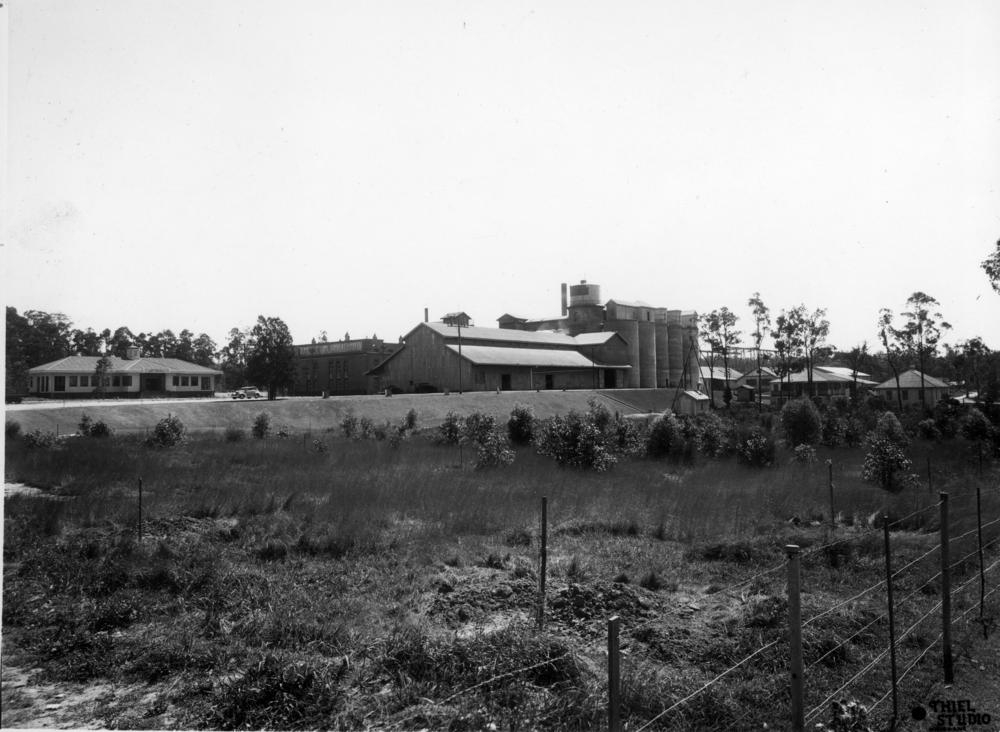
Queensland Cement & Lime Company Factory, Darra, 1939

Queensland Cement and Lime Company (QCL) was a company that manufactured cement and lime for use in construction in Queensland, Australia. It supplied many major projects in Queensland. It was also known as Queensland Cement Limited.

== History ==
The company was established in 1914, operating a cement factory at Station Road (now Station Avenue), Darra in Brisbane (27.5646°S 152.9508°E). From 1916, it obtained limestone from Gore on the Darling Downs. In the early 1930s, it built Oxley Wharf on the Brisbane River at Seventeen Mile Rocks (27.5444°S 152.9645°E). The company had a dredge at Mud Island in Moreton Bay from where they obtained coral, which was then transported up the river to the wharf from where it was conveyed via the company's private road to the Darra factory. By 1936, the company ceased using limestone from Gore in favour of the coral from Moreton Bay.

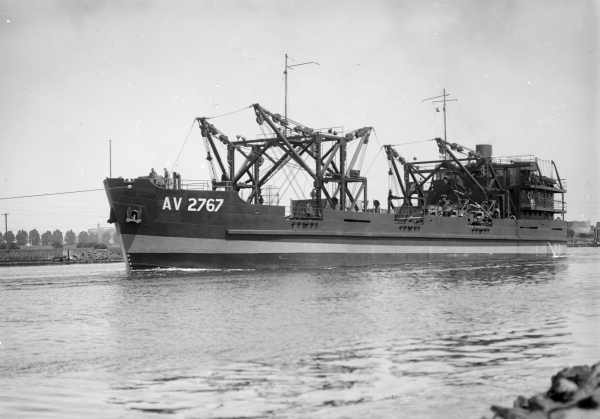
Army ship Crusader, 1945

In the decade following World War II the company acquired the Australian Army ship Crusader and the former HMAS LST 3022 after they were decommissioned from military service. These vessels were renamed Cementco and Coral respectively, and were extensively modified for their new roles. Coral was used to dredge coral from Morton Bay, and Cementco transported the material up the Brisbane River to the company's cement factory at Darra.

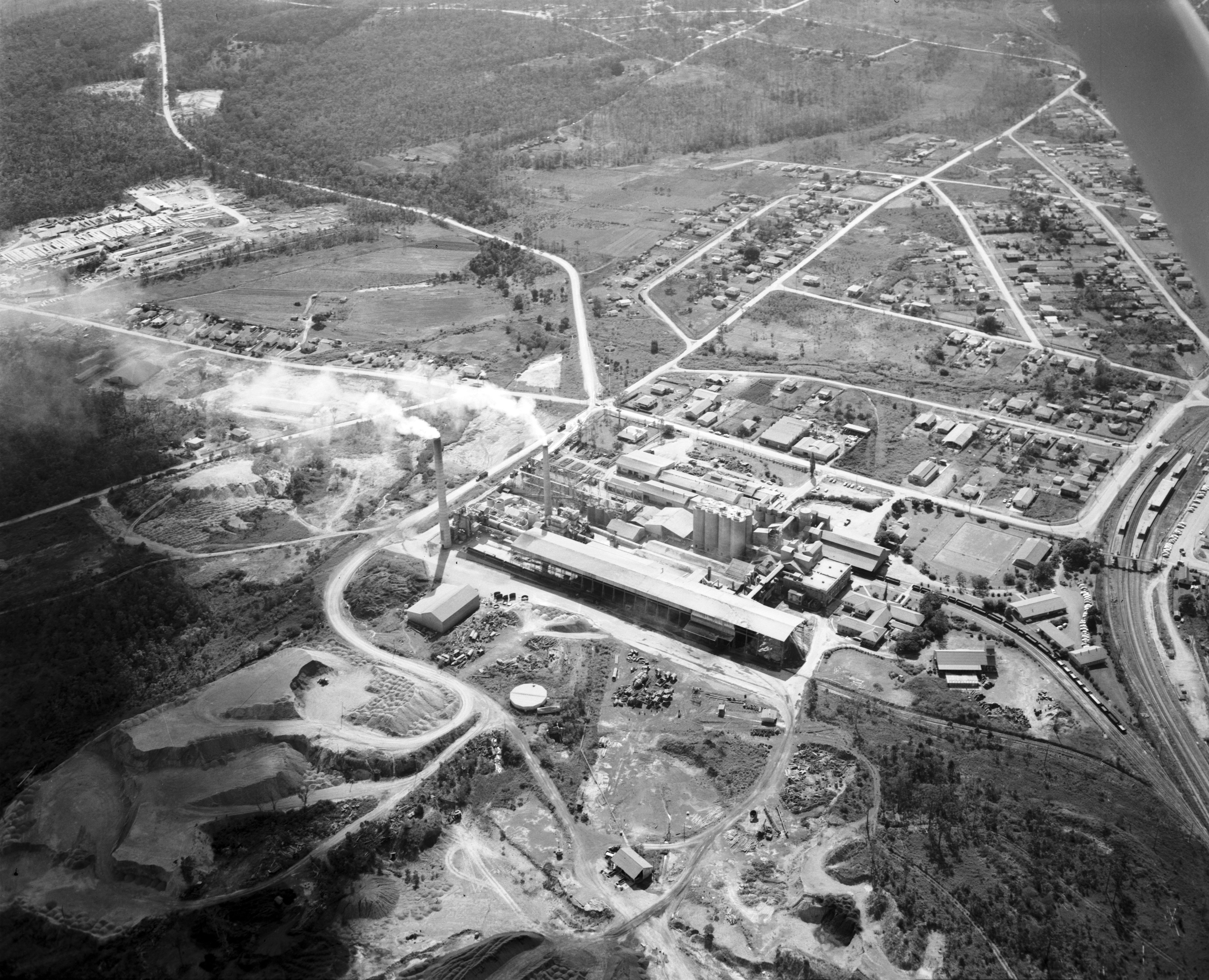
Cement works at Darra, with Darra railway station (far right), 1965

In 1969, the road transport was replaced by a 3.5 km overhead conveyor. In 1988 the company was renamed Queensland Cement Limited following some company mergers. In 1995, the company was unable to renew its dredging licences for Moreton Bay, leading to the closure of the Darra factory in 1998 after its stockpile was completely exhausted.

In 2003, the company merged with Australian Cement Holdings to create Cement Australia, which (as at 2020) still has some facilities at Station Avenue within a large industrial estate.

== Legacy ==
The company's wharf site at Seventeen Mile Rocks was taken over by Brisbane City Council in 1990. The council developed the site into the Rocks Riverside Park which opened in December 2003. The park incorporates elements of its industrial heritage.

The locality of Cement Mills in the Goondiwindi Region is located at the site of the company's works near Gore.
