= Steele Barracks (Moorebank) =

Steele Barracks was an Australian Army base in the Sydney suburb of Moorebank in New South Wales, near Liverpool. It was the home of the Royal Australian Engineers School of Military Engineering (SME), which was established there in 1940, as well as the RAE Museum, and the RAE Golf Club. It was also the location of the Regional Headquarters for the NSW Brigade of the Australian Army Cadets before it was moved to Holsworthy Barracks.

The base was located on Moorebank Avenue and its main access road was the M5 South Western Motorway. It was situated adjacent to Holsworthy Barracks in the Liverpool Military Area. In the Federal government's 2010–11 Budget it was announced that $35.2 million would be spent over two years to move SME to Holsworthy. The move is scheduled to take place in 2014, after which the site will be turned into the Moorebank Intermodal Terminal.

The move – named the Moorebank Units Relocation (MUR) project – took place during 2017–2020 and has now been completed. The move was contracted to, and carried out by, the architecture firm BVN.

The barracks was named after Major General Sir Clive Steele, an engineer officer who had a key role in expanding the Corps during the Second World War.
