= Halley (ship) =

History
- Name: 1960–1975: Bass Trader; 1975–1984: Halley
- Owner: 1960–1975: Australian National Line; 1975–1984: Halley Enterprising
- Builder: State Dockyard, Newcastle, Australia
- Yard number: 64
- Laid down: 14 September 1959
- Launched: 3 December 1960
- In service: 5 April 1961
- Out of service: 8 June 1982
- Identification: IMO number: 5037735
- Fate: Scrapped

General characteristics
- Tonnage: 4,129 GT
- Length: 98.2 m (322 ft 2 in)
- Beam: 17.3 m (56 ft 9 in)
- Propulsion: 2 Napier Deltic T18-27Cs

Halley, formerly Bass Trader, was a roll-on/roll-off ship operated by Australian National Line.

== History ==
Bass Trader was the second roll-on/roll-off ship operated by Australian National Line. Its keel was laid at the State Dockyard, Newcastle on 14 September 1959, being launched on 3 December 1960 by Minister for Customs Denham Henty's wife. It was commissioned 5 April 1961.

It operated from Webb Dock to Burnie, Bell Bay and Devonport. In February 1966 it ran aground in Port Phillip off St Leonards. It was withdrawn on 14 March 1975 and sold to Halley Enterprising, Italy in and renamed Halley. It was withdrawn on 8 June 1982 and scrapped in Savona, Italy in November 1984.
