= Australian Shipbuilding Board =

The Australian Shipbuilding Board was an Australian government authority formed in March 1941.

The board was tasked with the control of building all merchant ships built in Australian shipyards.

In January 1957 the Australian Coastal Shipping Commission replaced the Australian Shipbuilding Board.

== See also ==
- Australian Shipping Board
