= MS Princess of Tasmania =

Ferry of the "Australian National Line"

- Princess of Tasmania on the slipway of the State Dockyard in December 1958

History
- Name: 1959–1975: Princess of Tasmania; 1975–1984: Marine Cruiser; 1984: Majorca Rose; 1984: Equator; 1984–1985: Nomi; 1985–1988: Adriatic Star; 1988–1991: Lampedusa; 1991–1992: Shahd Fayez; 1992–2000: Al Mahrousa; 2000–2005: Tebah 2000
- Owner: 1959–1972: Australian National Line; 1972: Bahamarine Limited; 1972–1977: Canadian National; 1977–1984: Rideau Shipping Co; 1984: Dolphin International Shipping; 1984: Equator Shipping Co; 1984–1985: Comeret; 1985–1988: Adriatic Ferries; 1988–1991: Traghetti delle Isole; 1991–1992: Fayez Trading & Shipping; 1992–2000: Al Mahar Marine Co; 2000–2005: Nouran Navigation
- Builder: State Dockyard, Newcastle, New South Wales
- Yard number: 61
- Laid down: 15 November 1957
- Launched: 15 December 1958
- Maiden voyage: 23 September 1959
- Identification: IMO number: 5284986
- Fate: Scrapped, Alang, India, March 2005

General characteristics
- Tonnage: 3,964 GRT
- Length: 113.32 metres (371.8 ft)
- Beam: 17.73 metres (58.2 ft)
- Draught: 4.74 metres (15.6 ft)
- Propulsion: Two 9-cylinder Nydquist & Holm Polar M69TS diesel engines, 8,600 horsepower (6,400 kW)
- Speed: 17.75 knots (32.87 km/h; 20.43 mph)
- Capacity: 334 passengers, 142 vehicles
- Crew: 67

MS Princess of Tasmania was an Australian-built roll-on/roll-off passenger ferry commissioned by the Australian National Line (ANL) to operate a vehicle and passenger service across Bass Strait between mainland Australia and Tasmania. Constructed by the State Dockyard at Newcastle, New South Wales, the vessel was designed to modernise the Devonport to Melbourne route by enabling vehicles to be driven directly on and off the ship, significantly reducing loading times and improving service capacity.

Laid down on 15 November 1957 and launched on 15 December 1958, Princess of Tasmania was, at the time of her launch, the largest roll-on roll-off passenger ship in the Southern Hemisphere and the largest vessel ever built in Australia.

As built, she had a gross register tonnage of 3,964 gross register tons (GRT), a length of 113.32 metres (371.8 ft), a beam of 17.73 metres (58.2 ft), and a draught of 4.74 metres (15.6 ft). Propulsion was provided by two 9-cylinder Nydquist & Holm Polar M69TS diesel engines producing a combined output of 8,600 horsepower (6,400 kW), giving a maximum speed of 17.75 knots (32.87 km/h; 20.43 mph). The ship was capable of carrying up to 334 passengers and 142 vehicles, and was allocated the IMO number 5284986.

== Service history ==
Princess of Tasmania sailed on her maiden voyage on 23 September 1959. On entering service, she operated the Devonport to Melbourne route across Bass Strait. The vessel remained in this role until 1972, when she was replaced by the Empress of Australia.

Following her withdrawal from ANL service, the ship was sold to Bahamarine Limited of Nassau and chartered to Canadian National, operating between North Sydney and Argentia. In 1975 she was renamed Marine Cruiser. In 1977, ownership transferred to Rideau Shipping Co Ltd, which operated the vessel until 1984.

== Design and features ==
The ship was constructed at a reported cost of approximately £2,000,000. She was fitted with bow thrusters that enabled lateral manoeuvring without tug assistance, and was granted a special licence to pass through the Rip at Port Phillip Heads without escort. Automatic stabilisers were also installed to improve passenger comfort in heavy seas, features noted in contemporary coverage of her early crossings.

== Maiden voyage ==
The maiden voyage from Melbourne to Devonport was conducted as a special trip for invited guests, including Dame Pattie Menzies, Premier of Tasmania Robert Reece and his wife, along with other political and civic representatives. The vessel was escorted across Bass Strait by the Royal Australian Navy frigate HMAS Quiberon. On arrival at Devonport, large crowds gathered along the banks of the Mersey River, with shops reportedly closing for two hours and schools releasing students to observe the ship’s entry into port.

As a commemoration of the voyage, Dame Pattie Menzies presented the ship’s master, Captain W. B. Williams, with an 1835 map of Van Diemen’s Land. Prior to arrival in Devonport, the vessel also made a ceremonial passage past Burnie, circling offshore following the recent withdrawal of the older ferry Taroona from service.

== Later years ==
During 1984, the ship was renamed twice (Majorca Rose and Equator) and changed ownership several times. In 1985, she was acquired by Adriatic Ferries and renamed Adriatic Star. In 1988, she was sold to Traghetti delle Isole and renamed Lampedusa.

The vessel continued operating under successive owners and names, including Shahd Fayez, Al Mahrousa, and finally Tebah 2000. She was sold to Nouran Navigation in 2000 and remained in service until being scrapped at Alang, India, in March 2005.

== Sources ==
- "Princess of Tasmania". Ferries of Tasmania. Ferries of Tasmania. Archived from the original on 29 January 2026.
