= St Helena Island National Park =

Island and protected area in Queensland, Australia

- IUCN category II (national park)
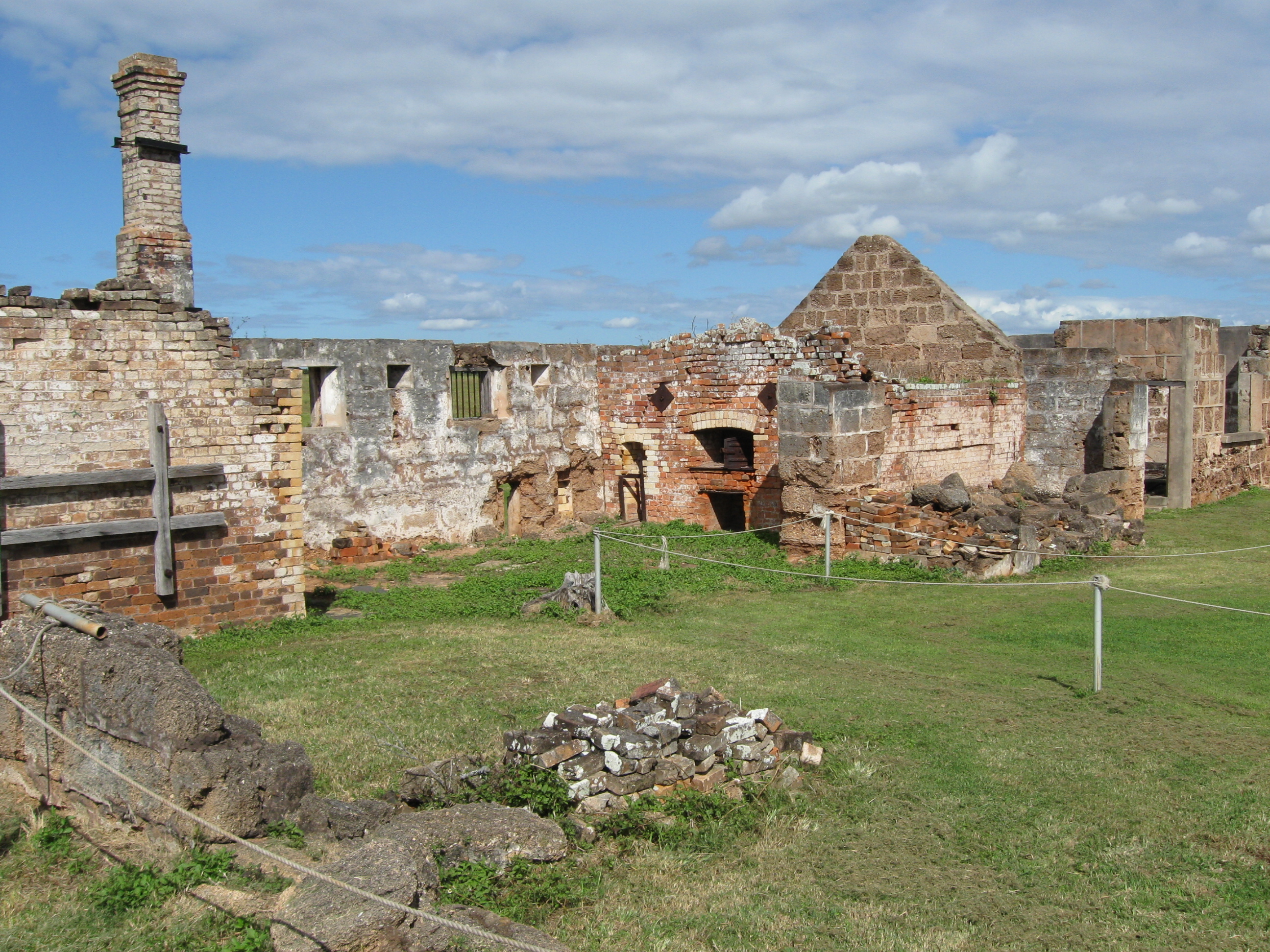
- Ruins of the butcher's shop and bakery at St Helena

- Location within Queensland
- Location: Queensland
- Coordinates: 27.3917°S 153.2328°E
- Area: 75 ha (190 acres)
- Established: 1979
- Governing body: Queensland Parks and Wildlife Service
- Website: parks.des.qld.gov.au/parks/st-helena-island

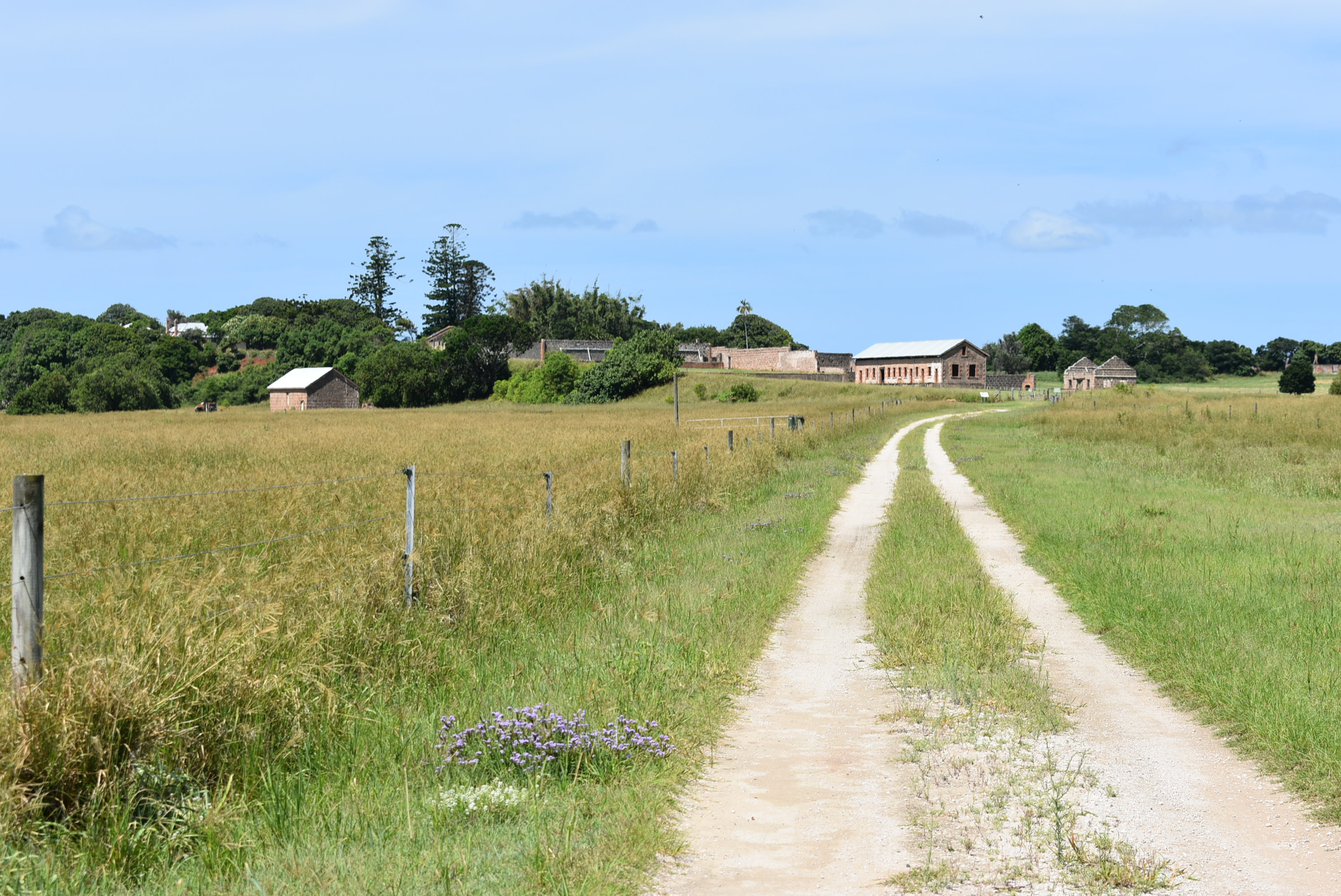
View of Saint Helena

St Helena Island is a heritage-listed island in Moreton Bay, City of Brisbane, Queensland, Australia. It is 21 kilometres (13 mi) east of Brisbane and 4 kilometres (2.5 mi) east of the mouth of the Brisbane River. Originally used as a prison, it is now a national park. Local Australian Aboriginals called the island Noogoon but it was renamed St Helena after an Aboriginal man named Eulope was exiled there in 1827. The island is visible from the mainland, particularly the suburbs of Wynnum, Manly and Lota. It has its own permanent water supply, a spring in the centre of the island. Many migratory birds use the island as a watering hole; it forms part of the Moreton Bay and Pumicestone Passage Important Bird Area, so identified by BirdLife International because it supports large numbers of migratory waders, or shorebirds.

== History ==
In 1827, Eulope (c. 1800 – c. 1840), who was the headman of the Quandamooka, was claimed to have thrown a spear at a British prison guard. Afterwards, he stole a steel axe from Dunwich, a military post on Stradbroke Island. Subsequently, Eulope was exiled to Noogoon by Captain Patrick Logan, which was uninhabited at the time. The island then gained the nickname Saint Helena in reference of Napoleon's exile to St. Helena. As Eulope had already known the island, he later stripped a sheet of tree bark, sewed both ends, and paddled back to Stradbroke Island.

In the 19th century St Helena Island was a quarantine station. It was also used to hunt dugongs for their meat and oil, a business that was profitable until the number of dugongs decreased, leading to the failure of the business.

It was operated as a prison from 1865 to 1933. Five of those involved in the 1891 Australian shearers' strike were imprisoned there.

=== St Helena Island Prison ===
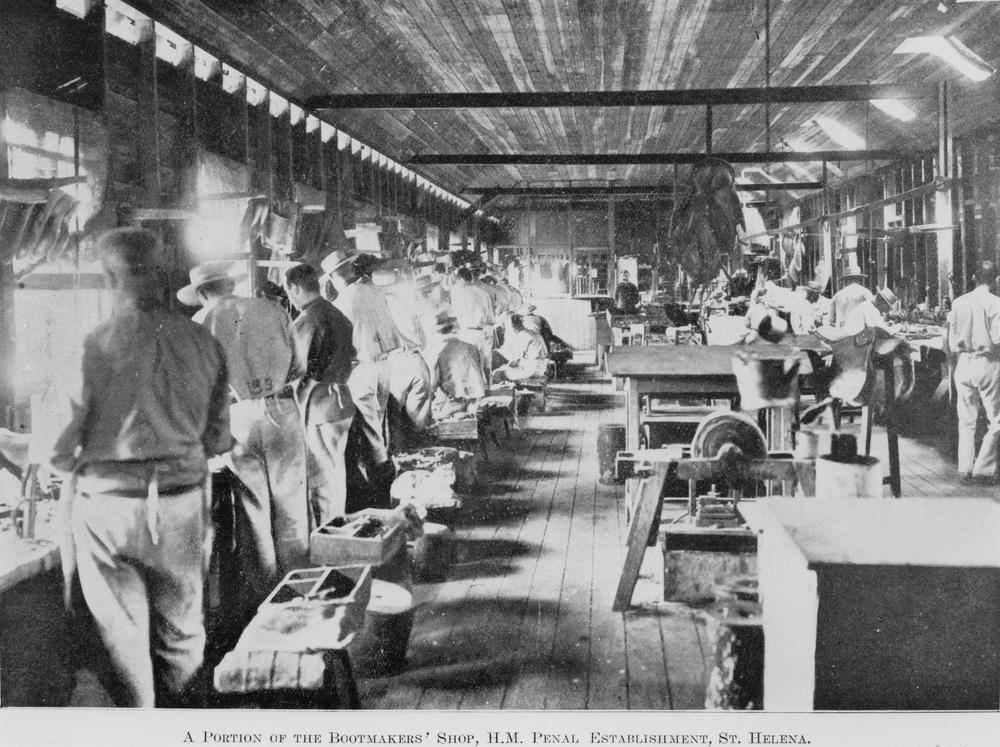
Prisoners making boots, 1911

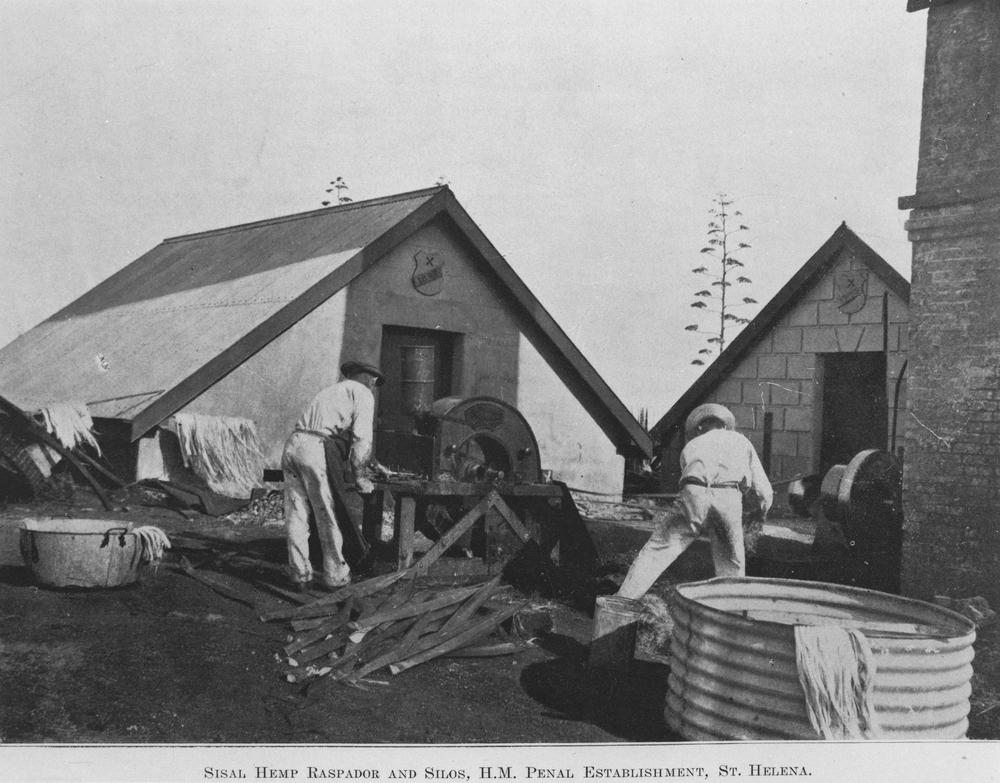
Prisoners making fibres from flax to turn into rope, 1911

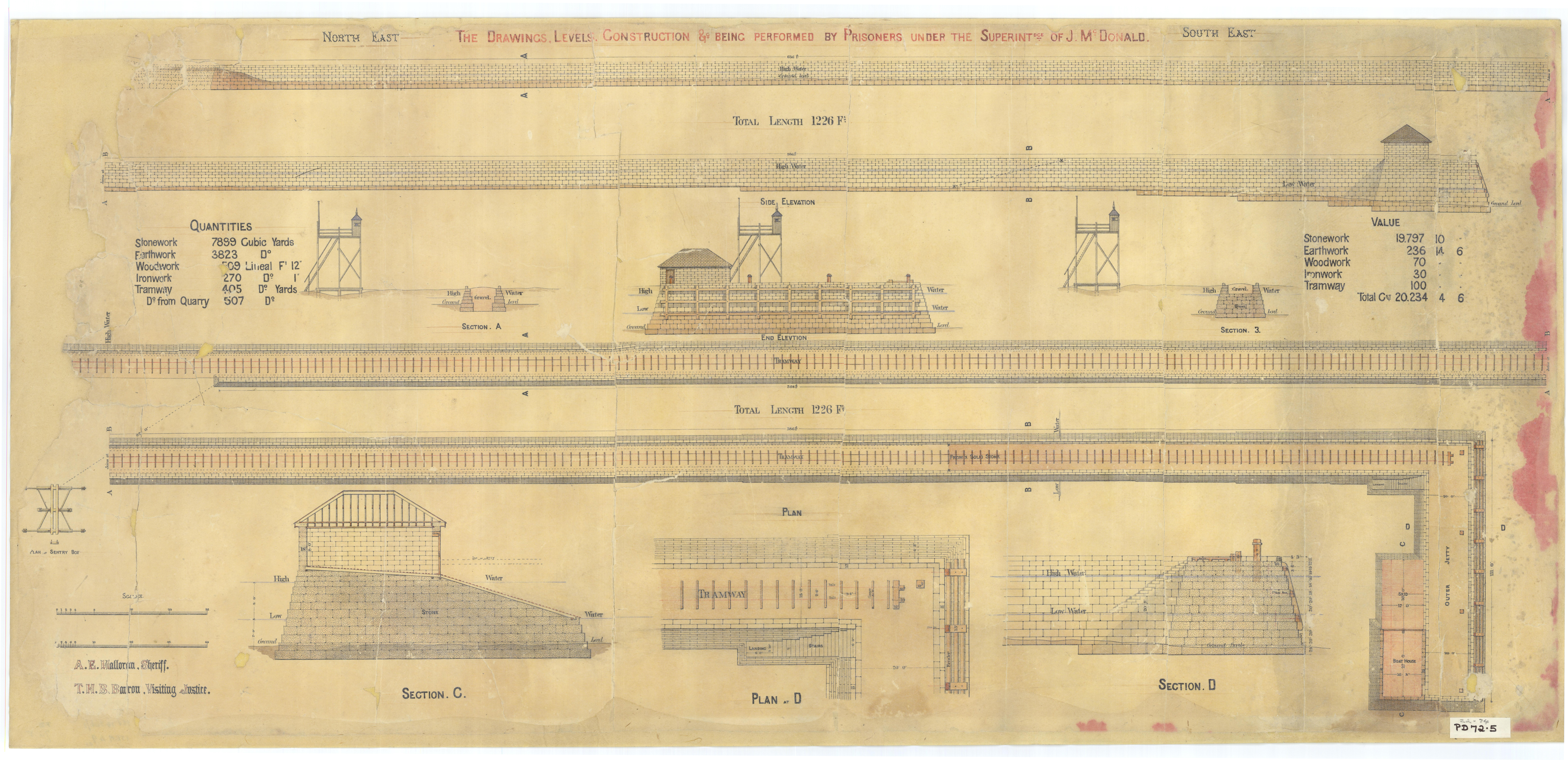
Plans for the prison, 1868

Four kilometres from the mouth of the Brisbane River lies St Helena Island. For more than 60 years from 1867, St Helena was the place of imprisonment for many hundreds of society's outcasts, for here was located colonial Queensland's foremost prison for men.

In the early 1860s, as Brisbane's gaol at Petrie Terrace became more and more crowded, about 30 prisoners were transferred to an old hulk, called the Proserpine, anchored near the mouth of the Brisbane River. In 1866, as part of their labours, the prisoners were taken each morning across the waters of Moreton Bay by whaleboat to St Helena Island. Here they were put to work sinking wells, clearing scrub, quarrying stone and building accommodation for a new quarantine station. They were brought back to the hulk each night.

Government plans for the quarantine station were scrapped later that year—because the conditions at Petrie Terrace gaol had become so unbearable, the prisoners from the Proserpine were set to work building a gaol instead. On 14 May 1867, the Governor of Queensland signed a proclamation declaring the island 'a place whereat offenders under order or sentence of hard labour or penal servitude may be detained'. In the years that followed, St Helena was to become Queensland's showpiece prison.

Architectural plans for a new penitentiary, 1887

The toughest years on St Helena were undoubtedly the early ones, and the ruins on the island testify to the hard work that the prisoners had to do. These, too, were the years of severe punishment—the lash, the dreaded dark underground cells, the gag, and energy-sapping shot drill. These were the years that gained St Helena its fearful reputation as 'the hell hole of the Pacific' and 'Queensland's Inferno'. But in these days tough measures were used, because St Helena housed some of the country's worst criminals. In 1891, for example, there were 17 murderers, 27 men convicted of manslaughter, 26 men convicted of stabbings and shootings, and countless individuals responsible for assaults, rapes and similar violent crimes.

Because of this, St Helena had to be a secure prison—and it was, through its isolation and its iron rule. During its lifetime, there were fewer than 25 serious attempts by prisoners to escape. Most of the 50 or so men involved were recaptured, although three disappeared without trace, two were drowned or taken by sharks in Moreton Bay, and a few were caught several years later.

By the turn of the century, the St Helena establishment had grown to accommodate over 300 prisoners in a maze of buildings surrounded by a high stockade wall. It operated as a self-sufficient settlement, and even exported some of its produce to the mainland, including bricks for many of Brisbane's buildings, clothes to be sold in Brisbane, and white rope for ships, which was made from imported Sisal Hemp plants. In the island workshops the prisoners were taught such trades as carpentry, boot making, tailoring, tinsmith, saddle making, bread baking and butchery. The island boasted a prize dairy herd which won many awards at the Brisbane Exhibitions. The island was extensively farmed, particularly in the later years as a prison. Maize, potatoes, lucerne and other vegetables thrived in the rich volcanic soil and the sugar mill crushed over 75 tons of locally grown sugar annually by 1880. In many ways, St Helena was regarded as a model prison for the times, and held in high regard by visiting interstate and overseas penologists.

By the 1920s, the prison had begun to show its age. In its later years, after the majority of prisoners and the workshops had been removed to the Boggo Road Gaol on the mainland, the island became a prison farm for trusties, with a few dozen resident inmates tenaciously dismantling the ageing edifice. Many prison buildings remain. The last prisoner left the island on 15 February 1933. The last prison superintendent was Mr Patrick Roche.

=== Escaping from St Helena Island prison ===
"It is impossible", wrote the Visiting Justice in 1869, "for prisoners to escape from St Helena. I am convinced of it. They would have three miles to swim." In fact, history was to show that the island was almost escape-proof.

Over six decades, there were more than 50 prisoners desperate enough to try to escape but, despite several super-human efforts, their attempts proved futile.

A few tried to swim. They were doomed to failure due to the dangers of the tides, offshore winds, choppy seas and sharks. Some took to crudely made rafts of driftwood and logs. One man lashed a door to two pine stools. Even a bath tub was tried. One pair planned to swim two horses across the bay with themselves as passengers. They were foiled by an alert warder.

Then there were those who took to boats. One commandeered a whaleboat after slinging the guard into the water. Others discovered boats which had broken loose from moorings on the mainland and had drifted unseen cross the bay into the mangroves at St Helena. Still others tried to break into the prison boathouse. Some prisoners perished in their attempt. The aborigine, Burketown Peter, clinging desperately to a wooden target-frame used by the warders during rifle practice, vanished beneath the waters of Moreton Bay as his makeshift raft headed out to sea on an outgoing tide.

One of the island prison's most publicised episodes took place in November 1911, when prisoners Henry Craig and David Mclntyre vanished for nearly two weeks. Most people believed they had escaped to the mainland and, as a result, a search was undertaken across South East Queensland. Warders turned out each day to search St Helena from end to end. Police and blacktrackers patrolled hundreds of kilometres of mainland coastline. On the twelfth day the prisoners reappeared. They had been hiding above the ceiling of the tailors' workshop on St Helena, where they had been aided by a prisoner accomplice who supplied them daily with food and water.

Most escapees, however, rarely got any further than the island mangroves and scrub where they were captured by searching warders, supplemented, if necessary, by police from Brisbane, or driven out by hunger, or by intolerable hordes of mosquitoes. In fact, only one man was not recaptured after escaping from the island prison. Notorious gunman Charles Leslie was whisked from the island early one morning in 1924 by criminal accomplices who were waiting offshore in a motor boat.

=== Tourism ===
These days, the island is a tourist destination for school children and visitors to Brisbane alike. The island is visited by Cat O' Nine Tails Cruises. Private individuals can visit the island but are restricted to the picnic area to the south west, and excluding the ruins. History tours of the island operate, including a Ghost tour.

2007 saw the first roving theatre on the island. Cat O' Nine Tails Cruises in conjunction with the St Helena Island Theatre Troupe, have written the show Secrets of St Helena. The show brings to life the often harsh but sometimes funny stories about St Helena Island. A repeater station for 4TAB is located on the island.

=== Historical timeline ===
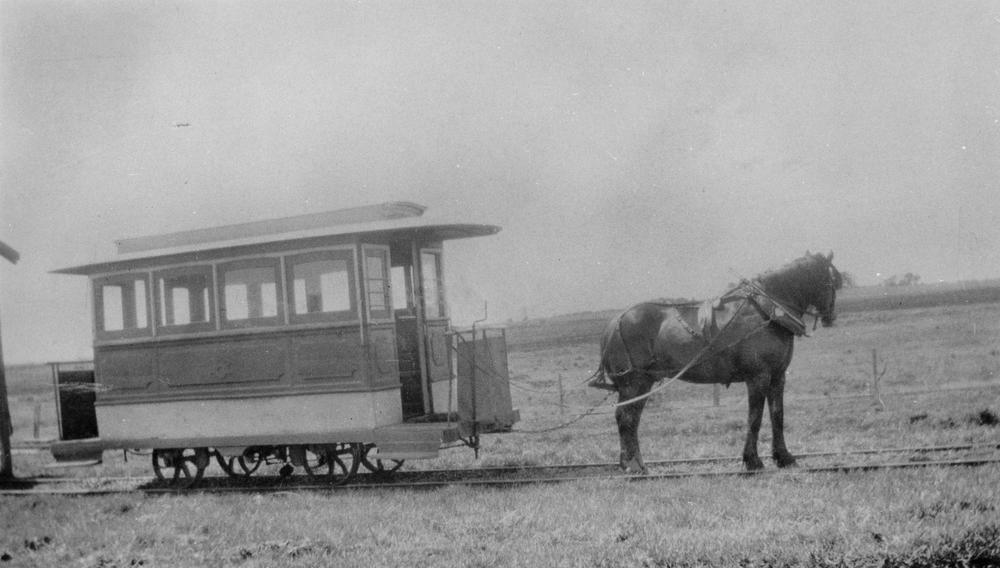
Horsedrawn tram, 1928

This is the timeline of events at St Helena Island:

- 720BC to 1840 (Approx) Inhabited by Aboriginal tribe, the Nooghies
- 1799 Island described as one of the 'Green Isles' by Matthew Flinders
- 1826 Named St Helena
- 1850s Fledgling dugong industry
- 1866 Quarantine Station built
- 1867 (14 May) Declared Penal Establishment
- 1875 Construction started on stone causeway
- 1885 Tramway commences operation (first passenger tramcar in Qld)
- 1890 Warder's families removed from Island
- 1891 Leaders of Great Shearer's Strike imprisoned on Island *
- 1905 Sisal Hemp growing started
- 1907 Lash last used
- 1921 Announcement of intended prison closure
- 1921 (to 1932) Became prison farm for low security prisoners
- 1922 Dismantling of buildings commenced (cont'd to 1932)
- 1925 Electric light installed
- 1932 (Dec) Official Prison closure
- 1933 (1 Dec) Opened to the public (under responsibility of Brisbane City Council) First passenger ferry service established from Wynnum Pier (Closed 1934)
- 1939 BCC handed Island back to State Gov't. Leased as dairy farm to 1973
- 1973 Charles Carroll acquires 2 leases on Island (tourism and pasture)
- 1974 Part of North Point leased to 4IP Radio to build radio station
- 1979 (4 Oct) Gazetted National Park
- 1980 (11 Sept) Gazetted Historic Area (First in Qld)
- 1981 First Park Ranger appointed to Island
- 1983 Coral dredging commenced Eastern side of Island (finished 1988)
- 1984 Carroll's leases requisitioned
- 1985 Education Queensland involved in guide training and collating archival material
- 1986 (Oct) New jetty opened. First scripted play, St Helena by Night staged on Island 1987 Horse-drawn wagon transport introduced to Island (until 1996)
- 1996 Diesel powered train commenced operation (until 2002)
- 2000 Establishment of Museum completed
- 2004 Queensland Prison & Penal Historical Association was formed by tour guides to assist in the restoration, research and promotion of the island.

== Heritage listing ==
St Helena Island was added to the Queensland Heritage Register in 1992.

== See also ==
- Protected areas of Queensland
- List of tramways in Queensland
