= Australian Shipping Board =

Australian government authority for shipping 1946 and 1961

Board overview
- Formed: 1 January 1946
- Dissolved: 17 November 1961
- Jurisdiction: Commonwealth of Australia

The Australian Shipping Board was an Australian government authority over shipping between 1946 and 1961.

The board was established on 1 January 1946, based in Melbourne. In 1956 the Australian Coastal Shipping Commission (trading as the Australian National Line) took over the responsibilities of the board, and took around forty ships previously operated by the Australian Shipping Board.

The Board continued to function until ceasing to exist on 17 November 1961. The Board membership as set out in the 1945 Regulations consisted of:

- the Secretary, Department of Supply and Shipping who was chairman of the board;
- the Director, who was deputy chairman of the board;
- an officer of the Department of Supply and Shipping;
- an officer of the Department of the Treasury;
- an officer of the Department of Trade and Customs; and
- four other members.
