= Benghazi burner =

Type of brazier

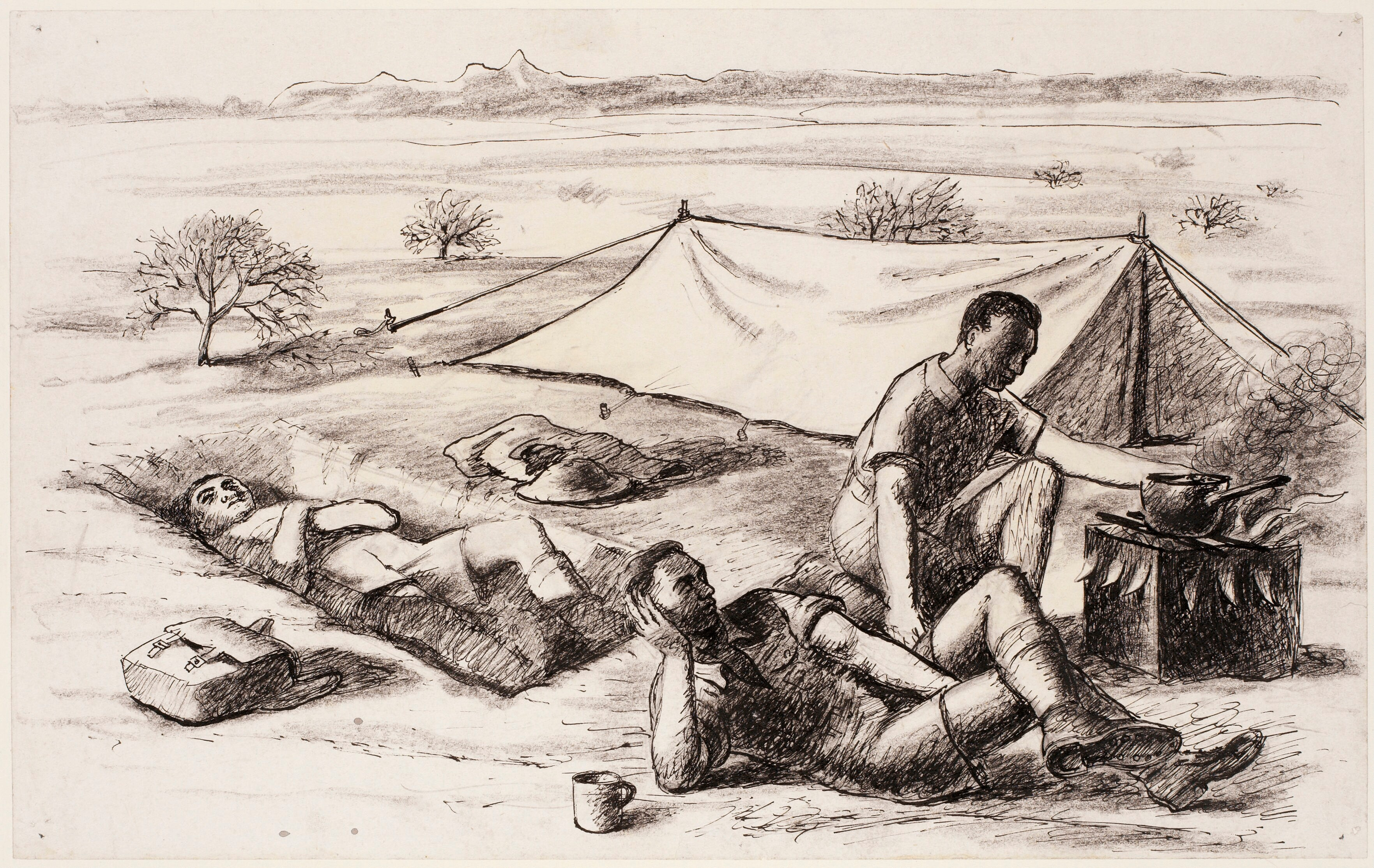
A soldier's sketch of British troops "brewing up" (making tea) in the Libyan Desert, 1940 to 1943.

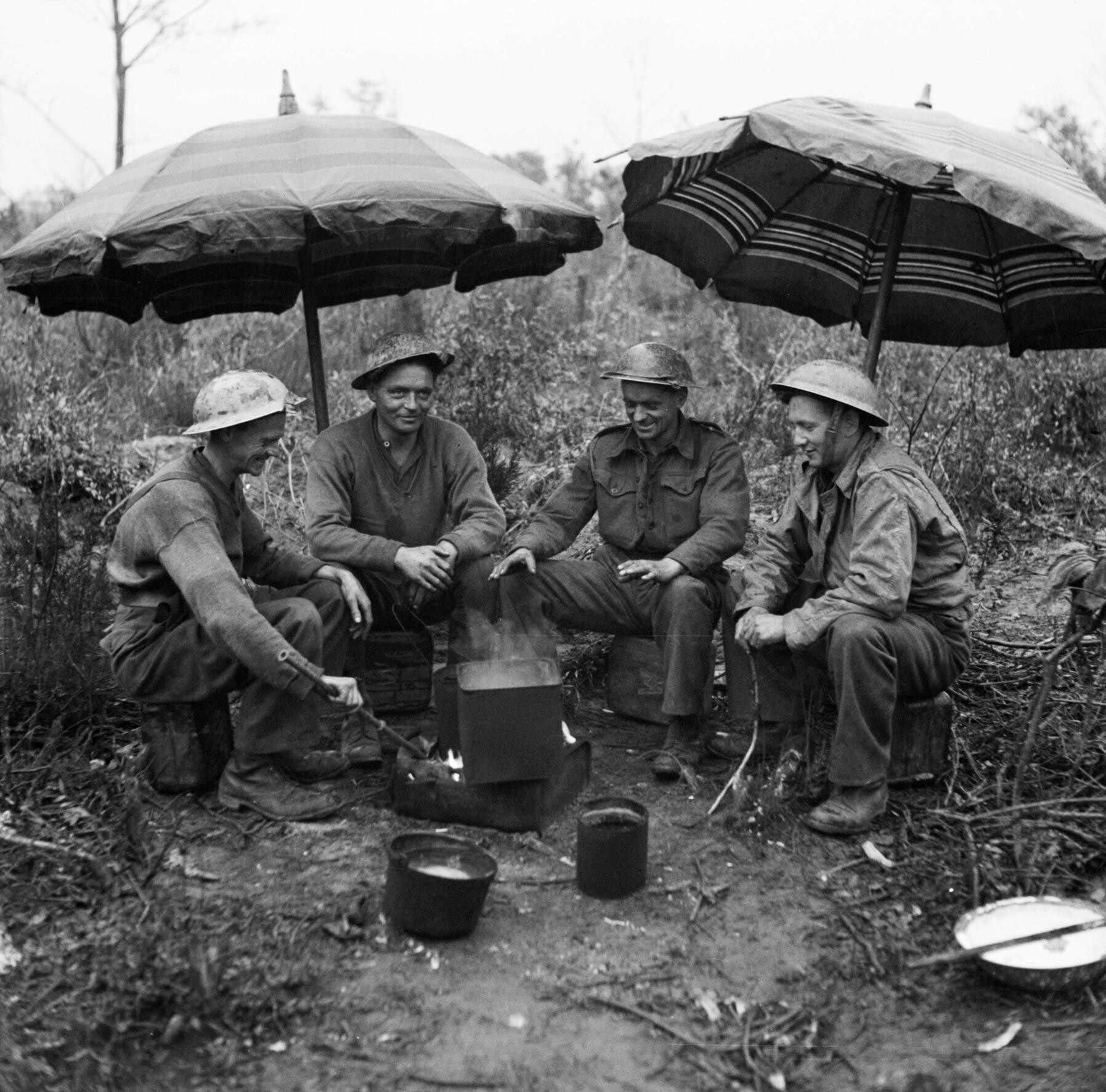
Members of the Royal Artillery in Italy, using sunshades to keep the rain off while making a brew over a Benghazi burner, February 1944

The Benghazi burner or Benghazi cooker was an improvised petrol stove or brazier used by British Army and Imperial troops in the Second World War, during and after the North African Campaign.

== The Western Desert campaign ==
As used in the Western Desert campaign, the Benghazi burner itself consisted of an empty steel fuel can—usually the 4 imperial gallons (18.18 L) type, known as a "flimsy"—or a biscuit tin. The sides of the top half would have some holes pierced in it, and the bottom half would be filled with sand. Petrol would be stirred into the sand and ignited. A second can of the same size would be secured on top and used as a cooking vessel. It was fashioned because the standard pressure stove issued to armoured vehicle crews, officially designated "Cooker, Portable No 2", was prone to blockages caused by sand. The Benghazi burner was superior in that empty cans, sand and fuel were readily available in the desert, it was very easy to construct, and it functioned silently. Its primary disadvantage was that it was unpredictable and the fuel would often burn out too early; soldiers were often tempted to add petrol to the hot sand, which could result in an explosion. An additional use was as a beacon to illuminate desert airstrips.

== Later developments ==
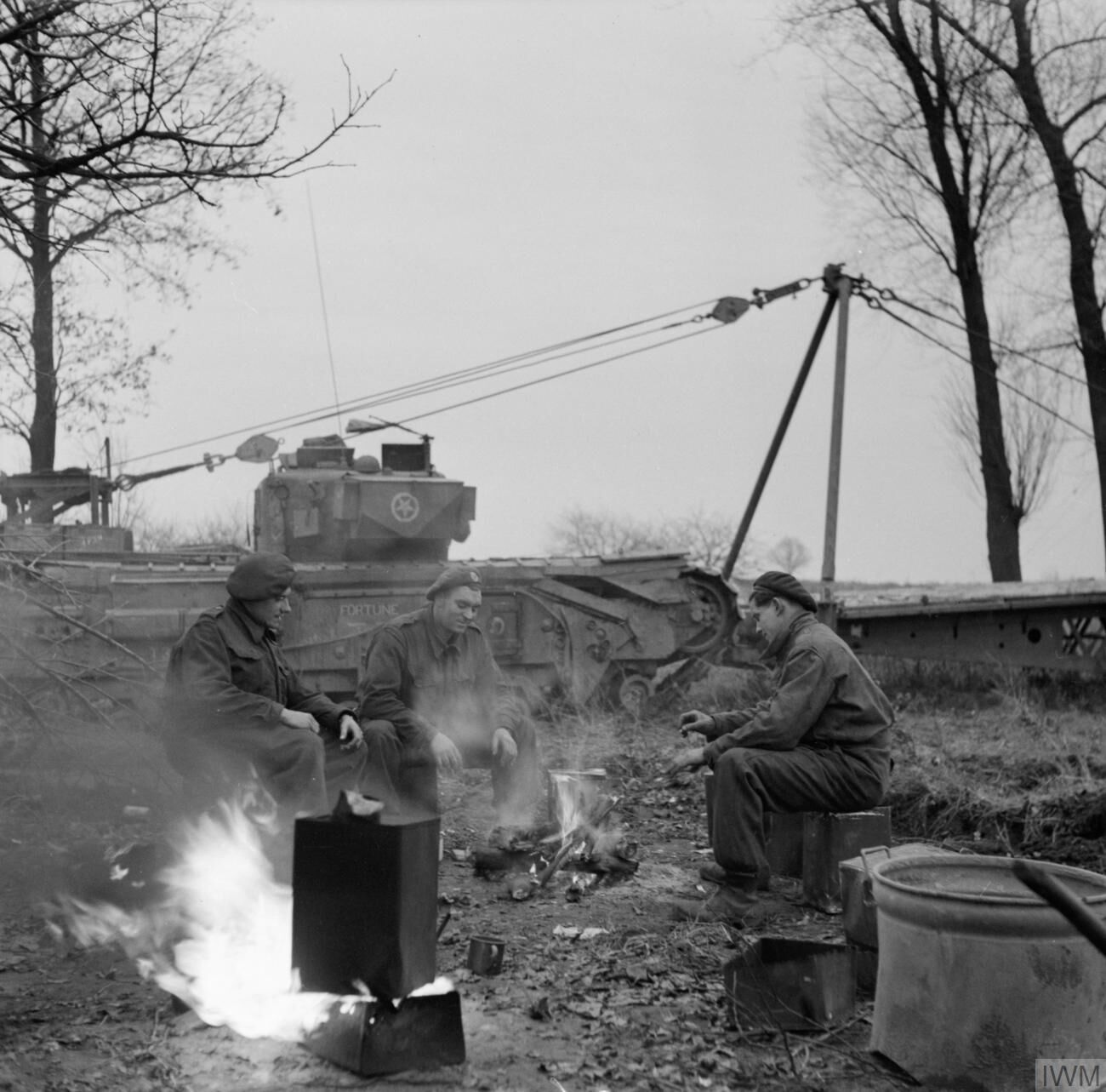
A Churchill AVRE crew, brewing up with a Benghazi burner in November 1944, during the Liberation of the Netherlands.

The burners were subsequently used during the Italian Campaign and in the North-West Europe Campaign.

The Benghazi burner was superseded by the introduction of the boiling vessel or "BV" which supplied hot water heated by a vehicle electrical system, however the Benghazi burner design had a brief revival by British forces in the Gulf War of 1990–91, albeit made from ammunition boxes.

== See also ==
- Kelly Kettle – a type of patent stove, known as a 'Thermette' in New Zealand, that was also sometimes called a "Benghazi boiler" in World War II
- Pebble-bed reactor – inspired by the burner
- Tommy cooker
