= Flimsy =

Fuel and water container

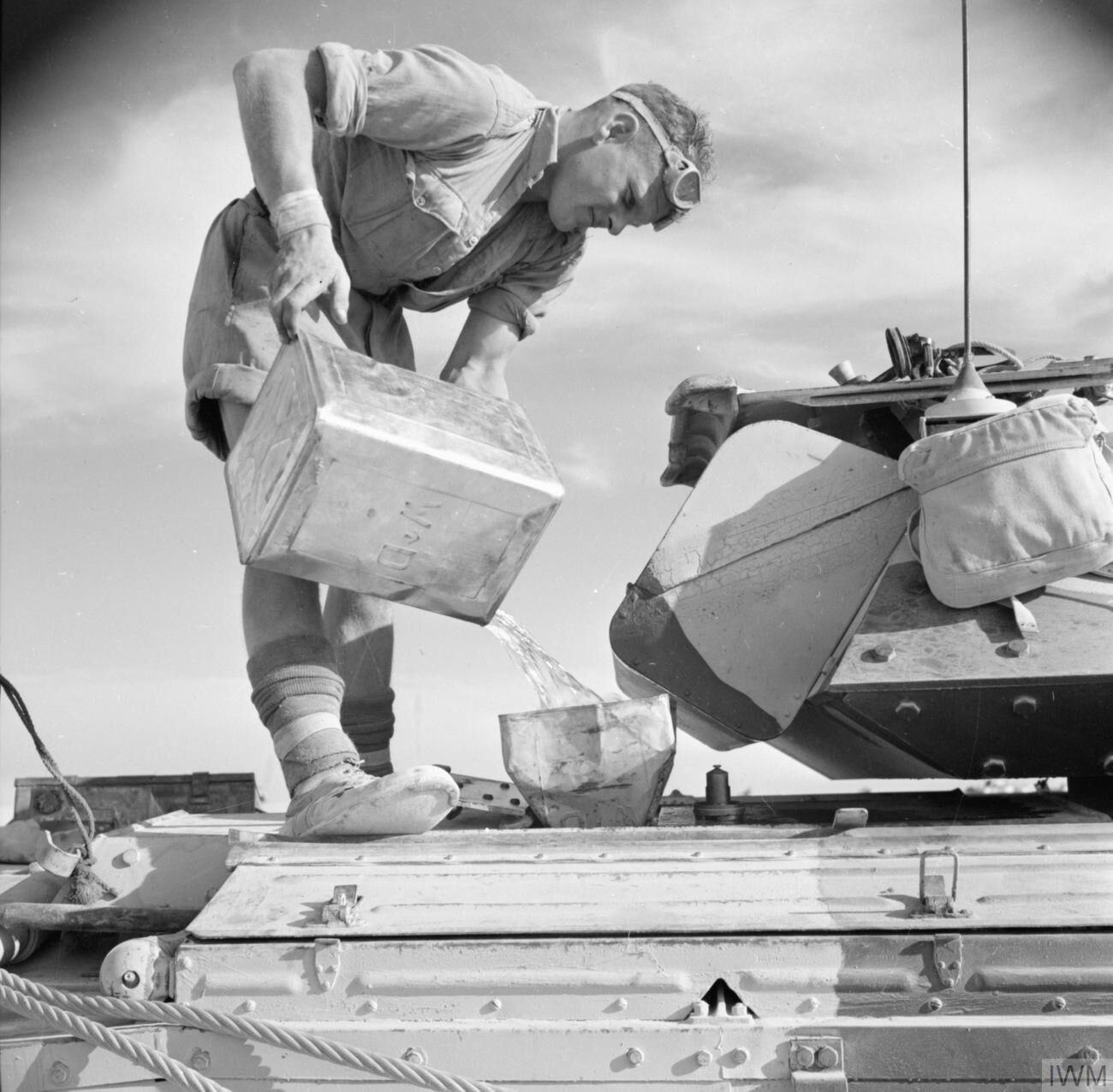
Crusader tank being refueled from a 4-gallon petrol tin

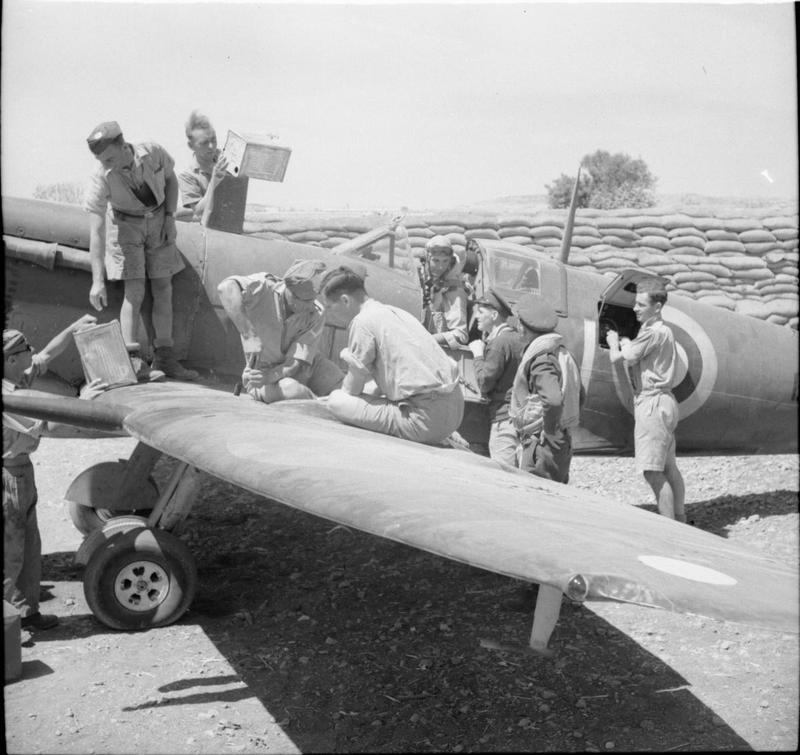
Spitfire being refueled from 4 gallon petrol tins at Luqa, Malta

The flimsy, officially known as the Petrol, Oil and Water can, was a World War II fuel container used by the British Army. They held 4 imperial gallons (18 L; 4.8 US gal) of fuel, which allowed them to be moved by a single person.

The flimsy was well known for leaking; when used in the North African Campaign, some flimsies leaked 20%, and in some cases over 50% of the fuel they carried over a journey. One quartermaster reported that his 70,000 imperial gallons (320,000 L; 84,000 US gal) of fuel had been reduced to just 30,000 imperial gallons (140,000 L; 36,000 US gal) over the journey; and was informed that even this was a "good effort".

The problem with the containers was the crimped or soldered seams, which easily split during transportation, especially over the rocky desert terrain in North Africa. Containers were stacked on top of each other during shipping, and the upper layers crushed those below, resulting in fuel flowing freely in the bilges, with the resulting poisoning and fire risks.

The favoured use by soldiers for the flimsy was as a small stove which could be used to heat meals and tea for the crews. A soldier would cut the flimsy in half, fill the bottom half with petrol-soaked sand and balance the other half on top, filled with water. This was known as a Benghazi Burner or Benghazi Boiler, after the embattled town of Benghazi. An alternative use for discarded fuel cans was to fill them with sand and use them to reinforce the walls of dugouts.

Both 4 gallon flimsies and the original 2 gallon cans were replaced by the jerrycan, copied from the much better German design of fuel container. This happened gradually from late 1940, first from captured stock of German jerrycans, then with British-made copies.
