= Boiling vessel =

Water heater in British tanks

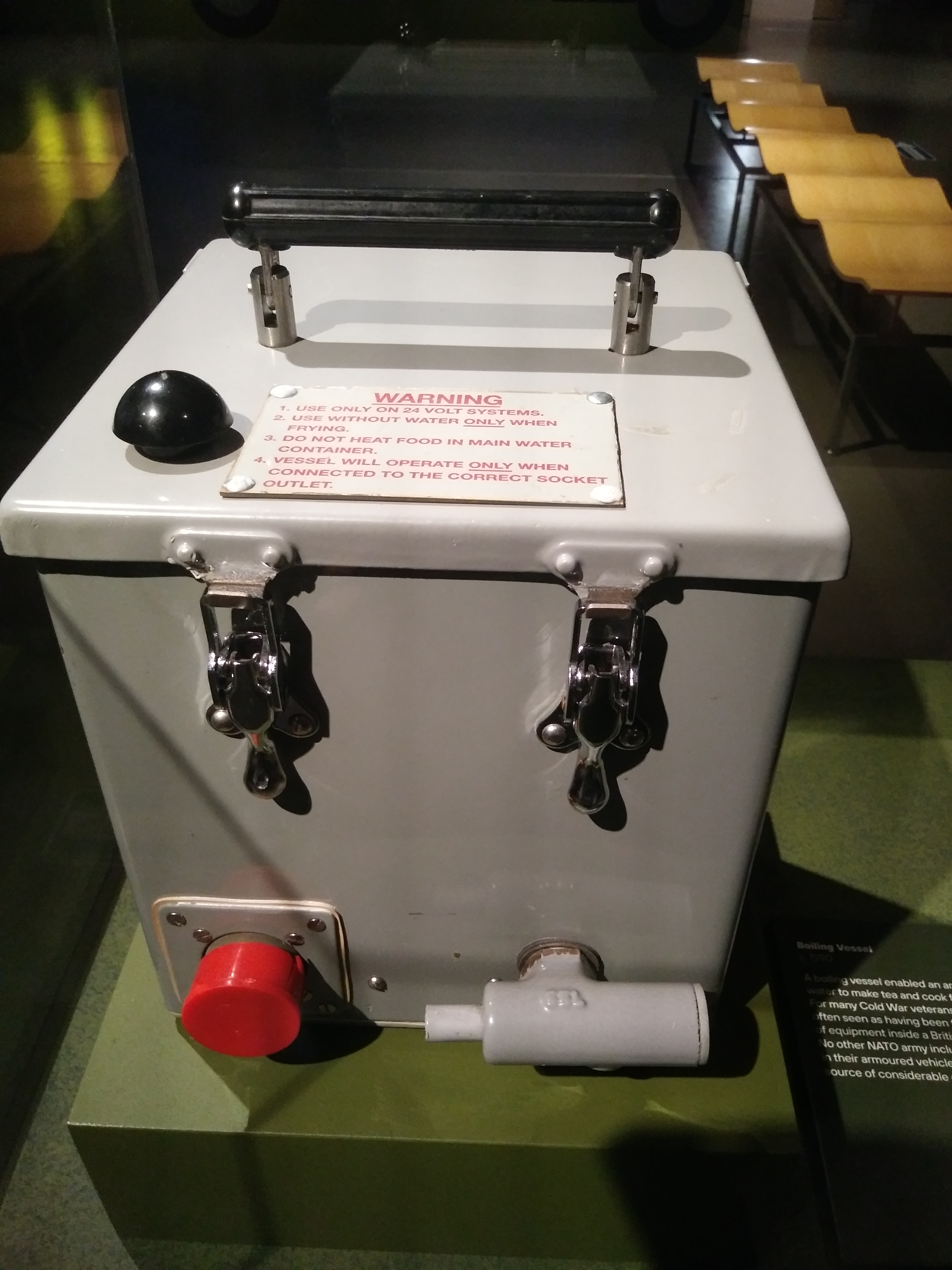
Boiling Vessel on Display at the National Army Museum

A boiling vessel is a water heating system fitted to British armoured fighting vehicles that permits the crew to heat water and cook food by drawing power from the vehicle electrical supply. It is often referred to by crewmembers (not entirely in jest) as "the most important piece of equipment in a British armoured vehicle".

== History ==
The "Vessel Boiling Electric" or "BV" was an innovation at the very end of World War II, when the Centurion tank was introduced with the device fitted inside the turret. Previously, British tank crews had disembarked when they wanted to "brew-up" (make tea), using a petrol cooker improvised from empty fuel cans called a "Benghazi burner". Use of the BV enabled the crew to stay safely inside the tank and reduced the time taken for breaks.

The first version, known as VBE No 1, began to be replaced in the early 1950s by the stainless steel No 2 version. A VBE No 3 had improved electrical sockets and was less prone to leakage. Besides being fitted to every tank designed since the Centurion, in the 1960s, the BV was fitted to the FV432 armoured personnel carrier for the benefit of the infantry carried on board. It is now fitted to almost every major type of vehicle used by the British Army.

== Current use ==
The principal use of the BV is to heat ration pouches or tins; the hot water is then used for making drinks or washing. The BV is cuboid and accommodates four tins; typically matching the crew numbers of an armoured fighting vehicle. Ration tins are supplied without adhesive labels so the surrounding water is not contaminated. The BV has recently been designated "Cooking Vessel FV706656" or "CV". It runs off the 24 Volt electrical system of the vehicle and is manufactured by Electrothermal Engineering Ltd in Rochford, Essex. Vehicles fitted with the BV include Challenger 2 tanks, MAN trucks, and Warrior, Warthog, Mastiff, Jackal and Foxhound armoured fighting vehicles, and earlier CVR(T) and CVR(W) reconnaissance vehicles, It is common practice for a junior member of a vehicle crew to be unofficially appointed "BV Commander", responsible for making hot drinks for the other soldiers.

Similar heaters, designated "Heater, Water & Rations" (HWR), are now also fitted to many US fighting vehicles.
