= Fuel container =

Type of container for liquid

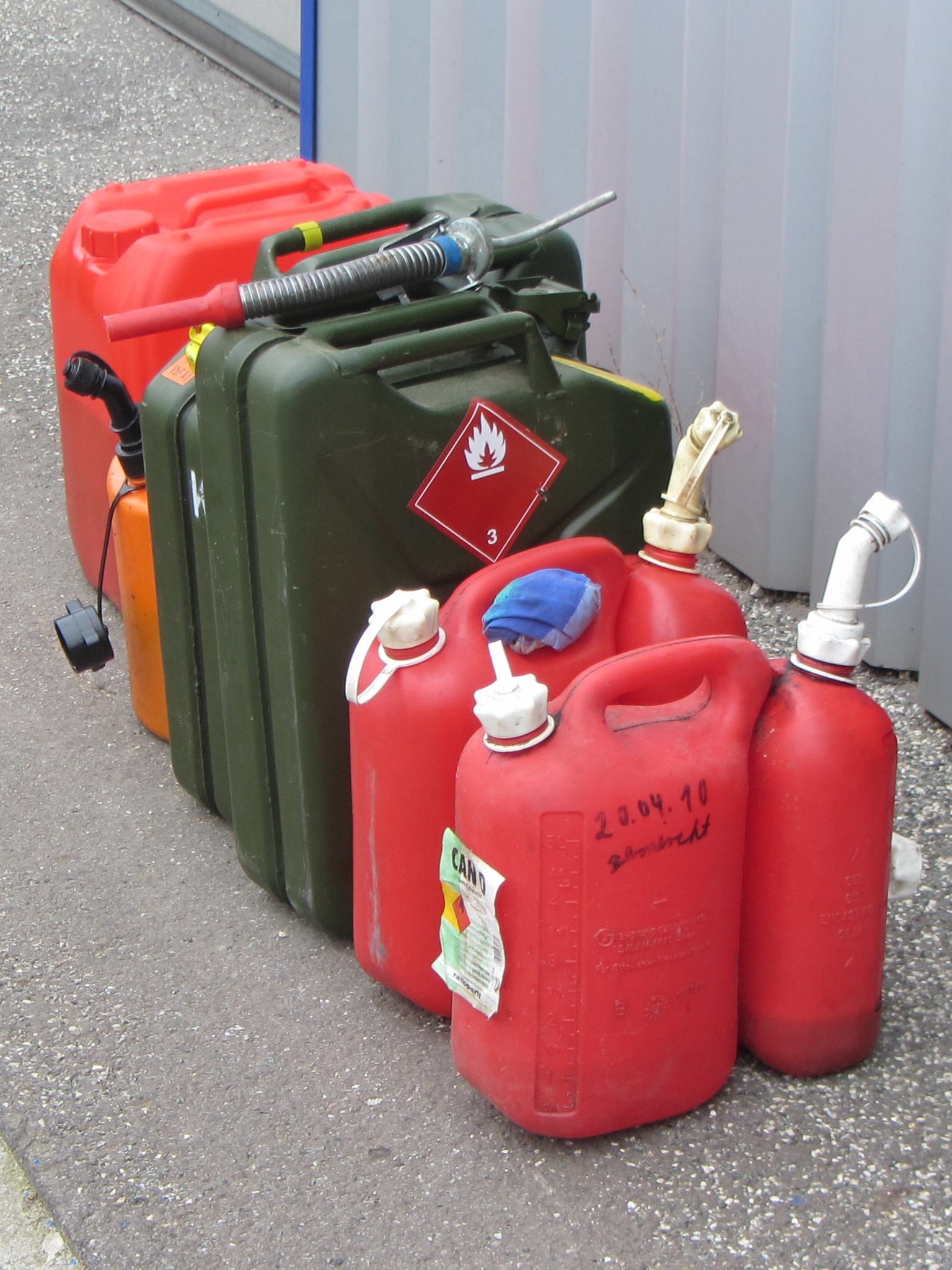
Various fuel cans in Germany, including red plastic containers and green metal jerrycans.

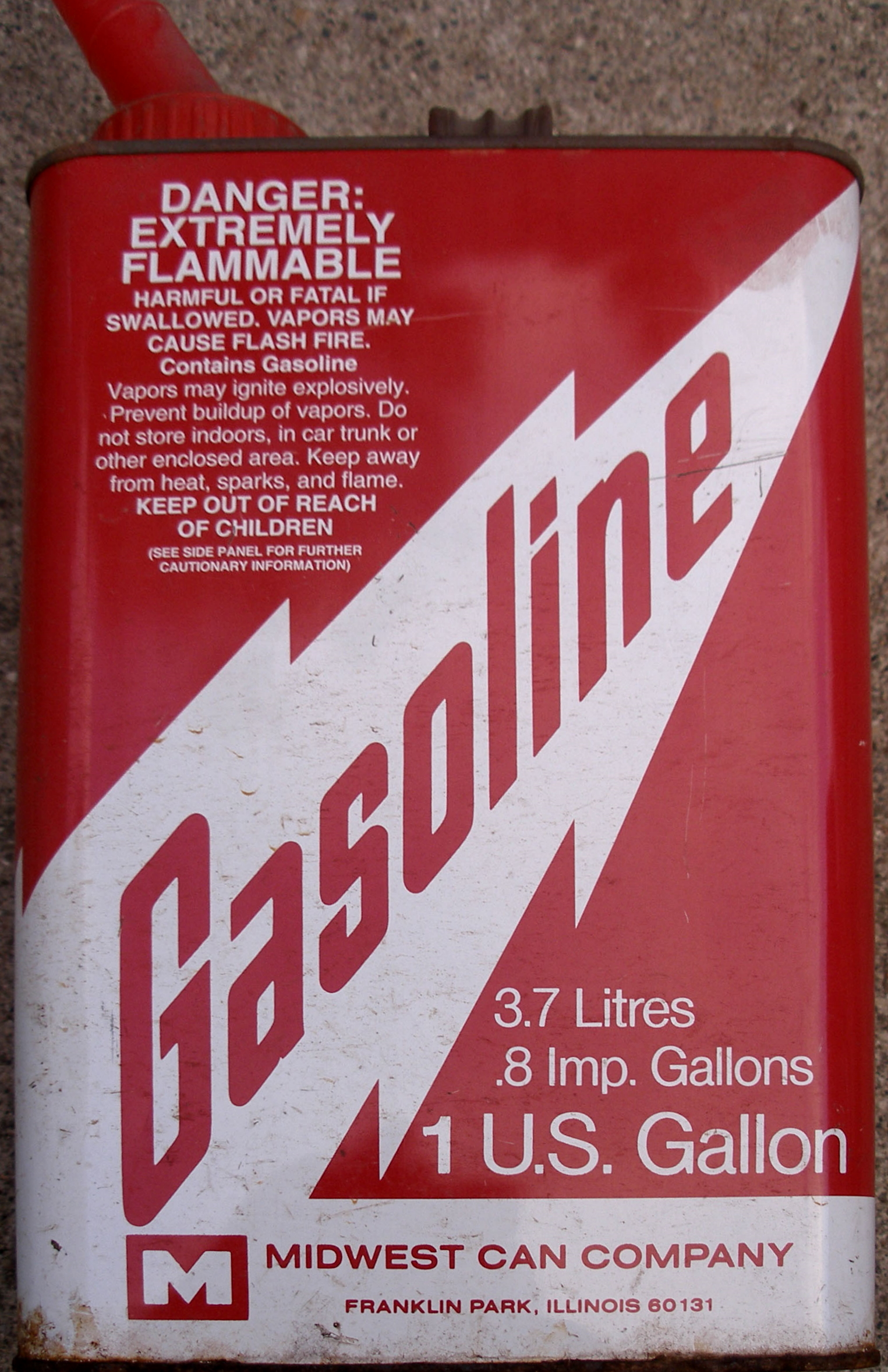
One US gallon (3.79 litres) of gas in an F-style can

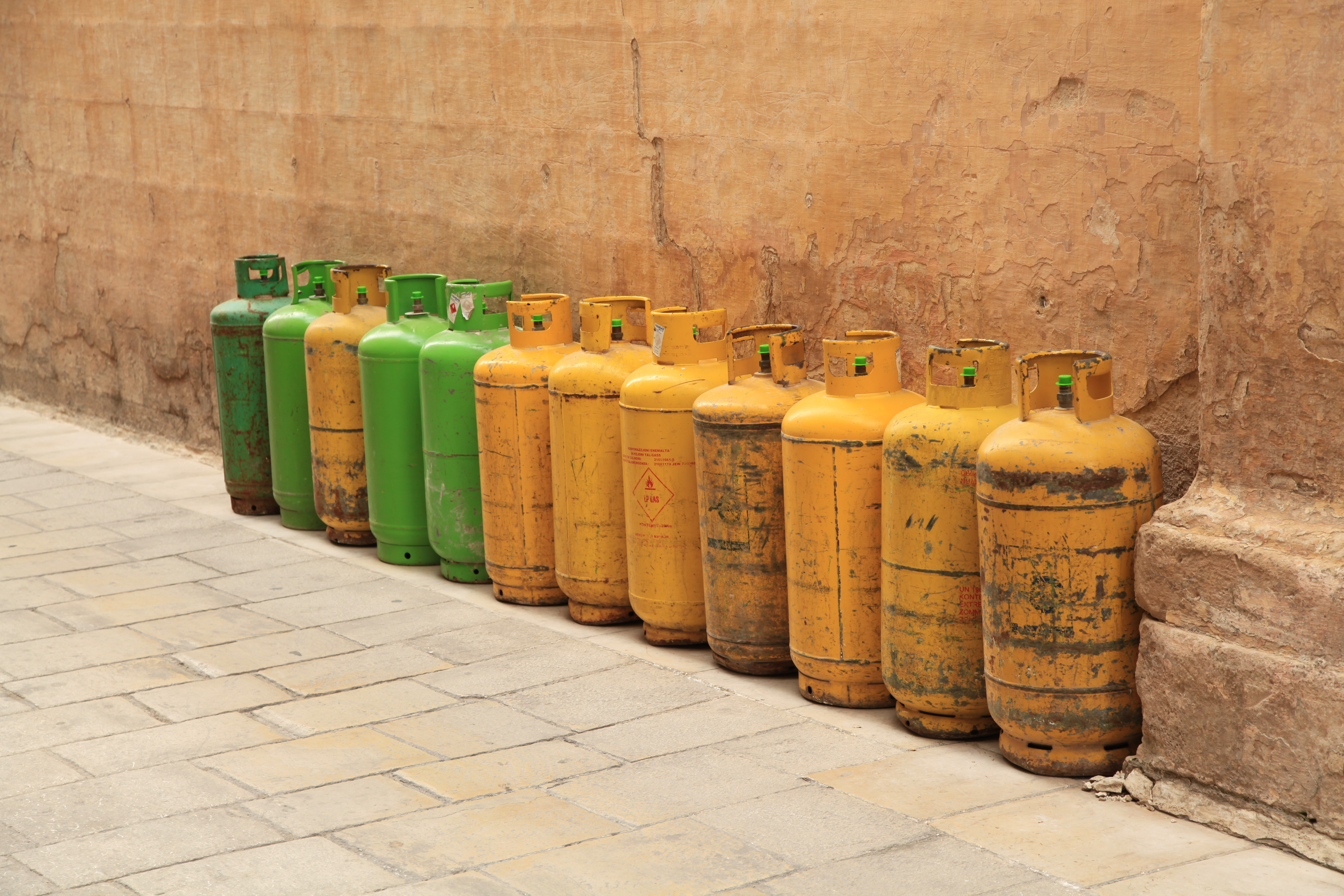
A group of 25 kg (55 lb) liquefied petroleum gas (LPG) cylinders in Malta

A fuel container is a vessel such as a steel can, bottle, drum, etc. for transporting, storing, and dispensing various fuels.

== Construction ==
A wide variety of container types and constructions are used for fuels. Each has its own engineering challenges.

The jerrycan is a robust liquid container originally made from pressed steel. It was designed in Germany in the 1930s for military use to hold 20 litres (4.4 imp gal; 5.3 US gal) of fuel. Three handles allow for two people carrying a full can or one person handling an empty can. The basic design is still in use today although construction is often of high density polyethylene.

Portable plastic gasoline containers are commercially available and are in common use. These are usually blow molded polyethylene or other polymers compatible with the designated fuel. It has been found that the use of flame arresters reduces the chance of fire or explosion of gasoline. Child resistant caps or closures are required in some regions or jurisdictions.

A drum (also called a barrel) is a cylindrical container used for shipping fuels. A typical drum has a nominal capacity of 200 litres (55 US or 44 imp gal). Drums are usually made of steel, but plastic drums are used for some liquids. Fuel drums need have the appropriate certification for shipment of dangerous goods: Flammable liquids, etc. Steel drums are suited for reconditioning for multiple uses.

== Grounding ==
Pouring of a flammable liquid has the potential of generating static electricity. Having the fuel container on the ground or having a grounding strap helps reduce the risk of sparks. In particular, loading a fuel container on a flatbed truck or vehicle can be dangerous because it is insulated. In industrial settings, bonding and grounding practices are commonly used together during fuel transfer operations to reduce static discharge hazards between containers and dispensing equipment.

== Regulations ==
Shipments of flammable or explosive liquids are highly regulated. Based on the UN Recommendations on the Transport of Dangerous Goods model regulations, each country has coordinated design and performance requirements for shipment. For example, in the US, the Department of Transportation has jurisdiction and published requirements in Title 49 of the Code of Federal Regulations.

The applicable regulation depends on the flash point of the fuel, quantity being shipped, mode of transit, etc.

== Examples ==
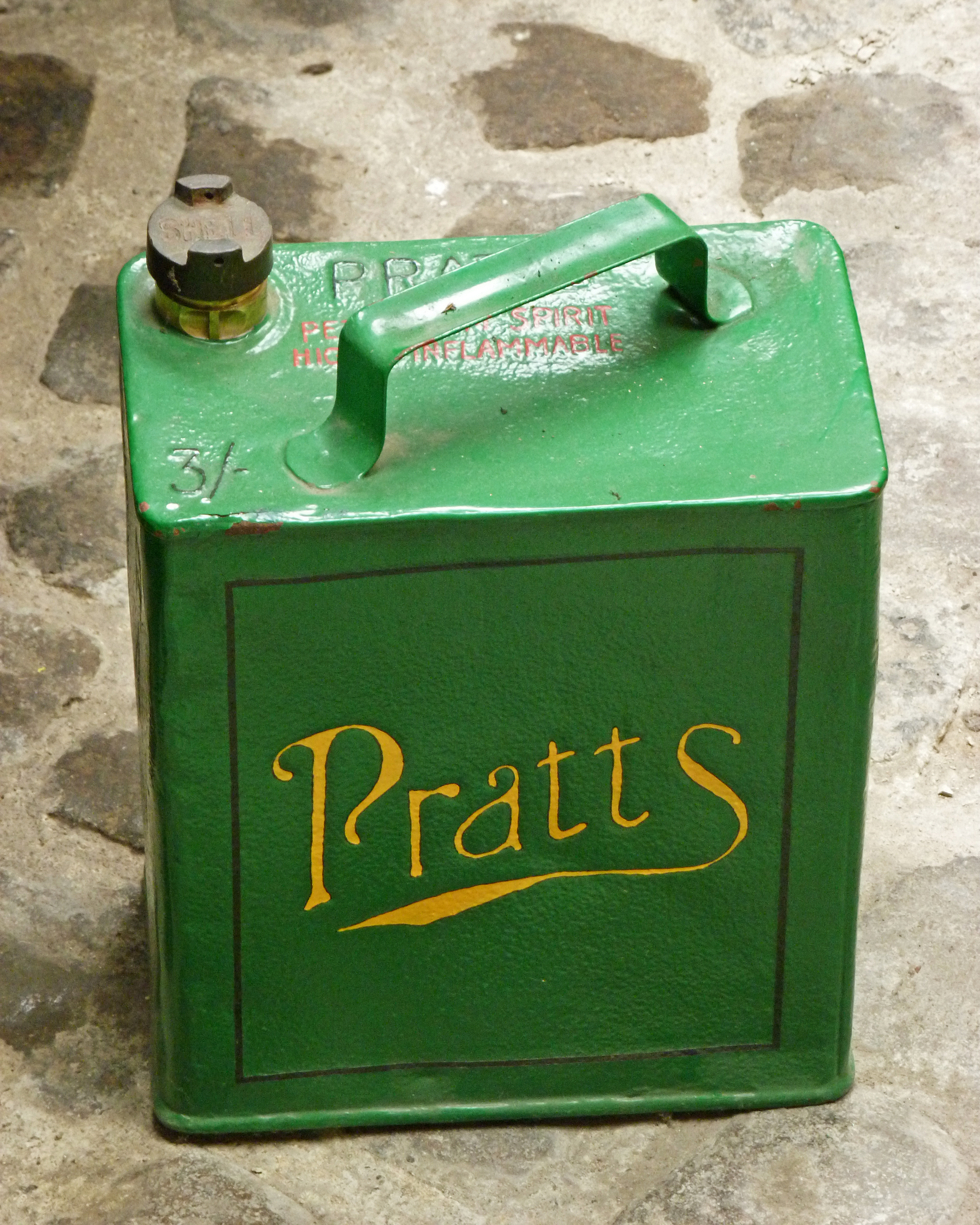
1930s vintage 2-gallon petrol can

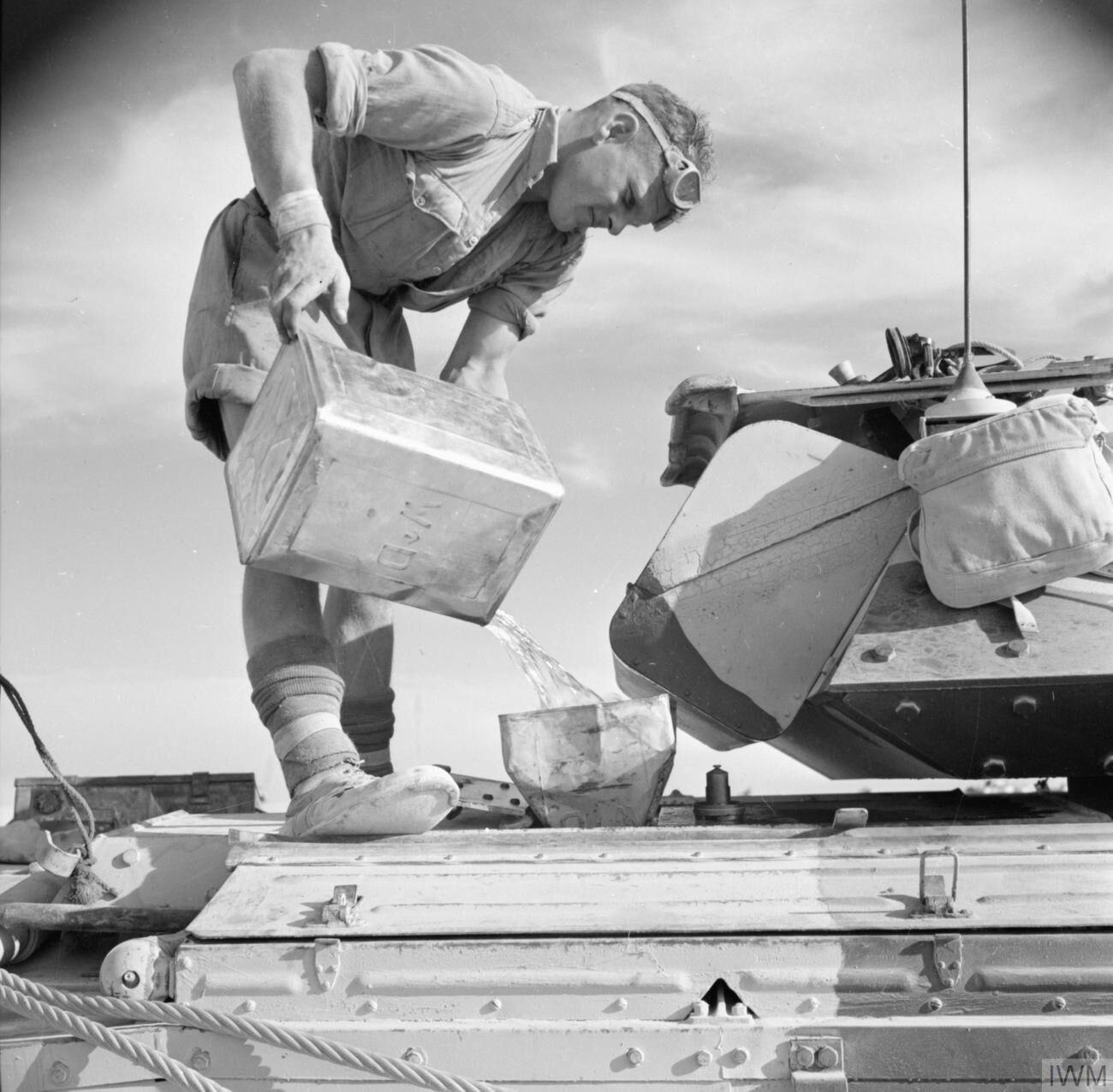
WW2 4 imperial gallon (18L) can or Flimsy

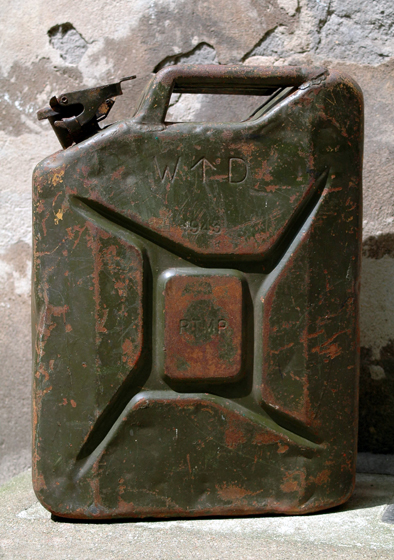
WWII Jerrycan

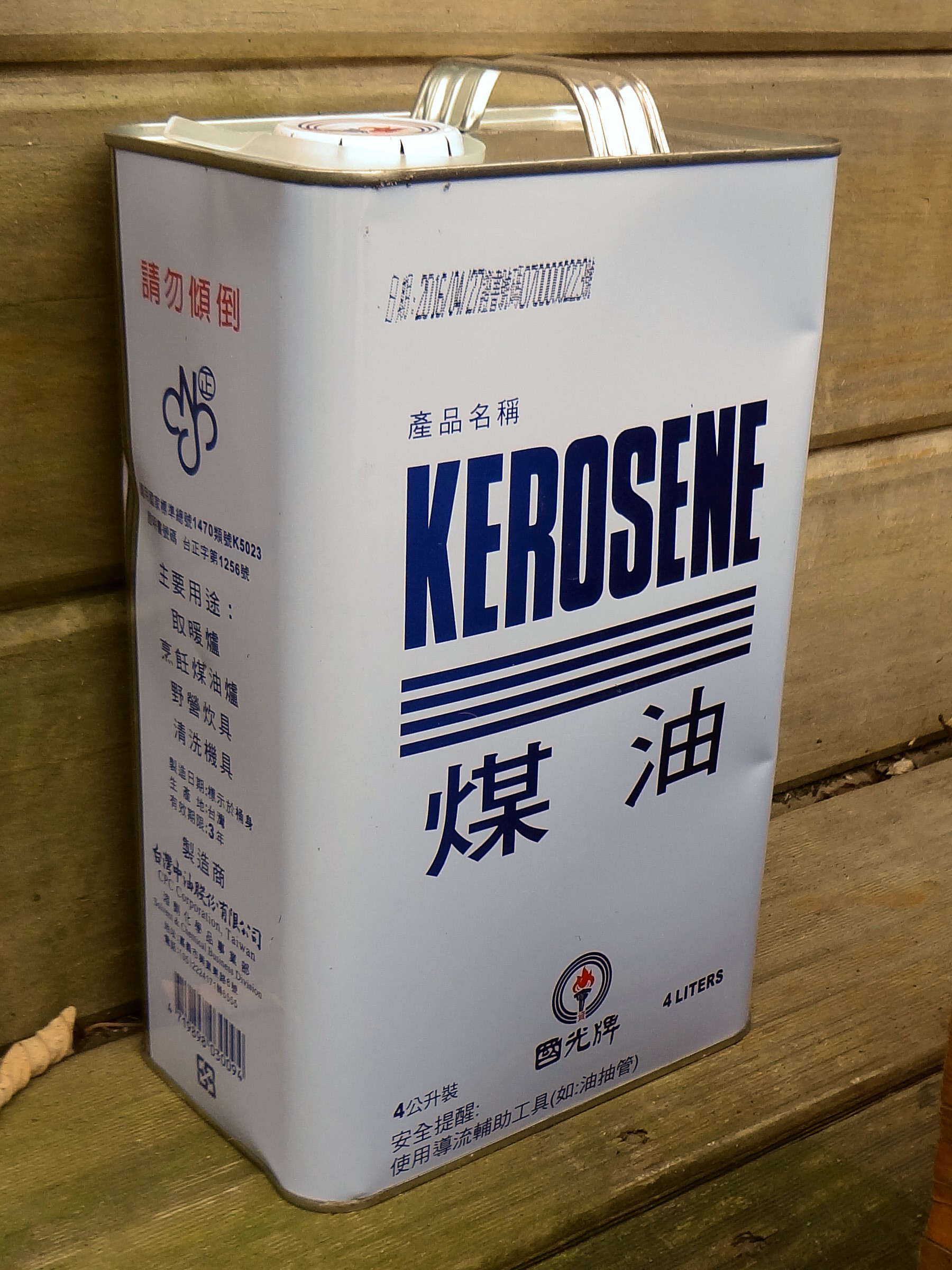
4L can of kerosene

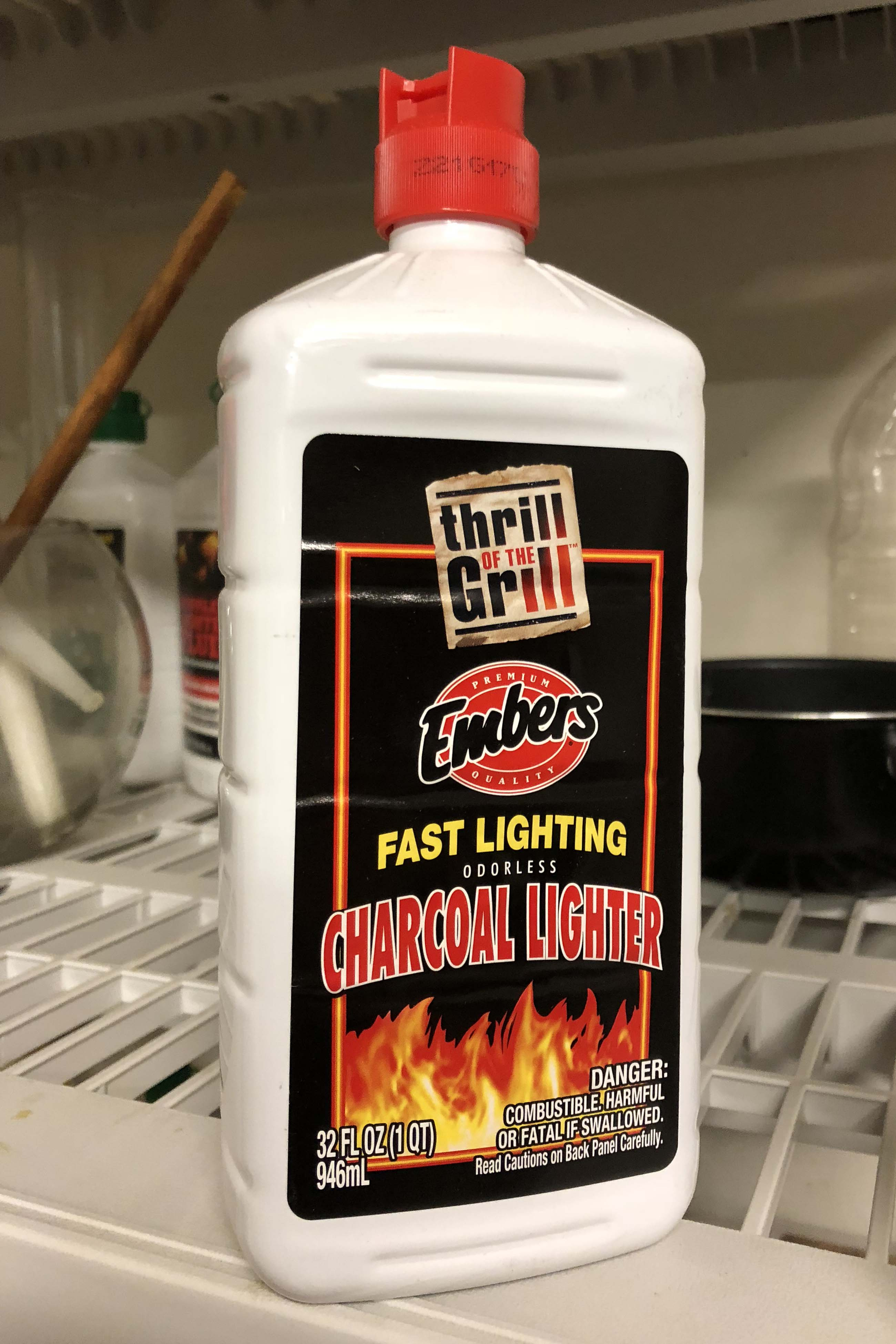
Charcoal lighter fluid in a plastic Squeeze bottle

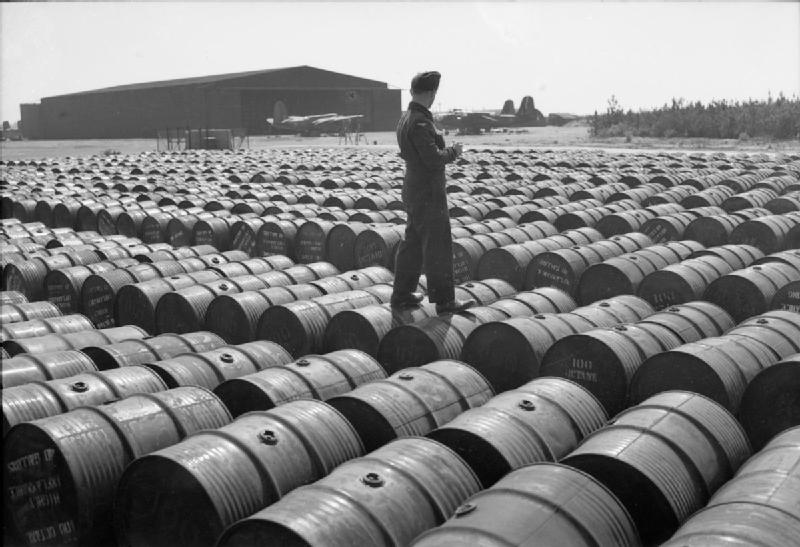
Drums of aviation fuel 1945

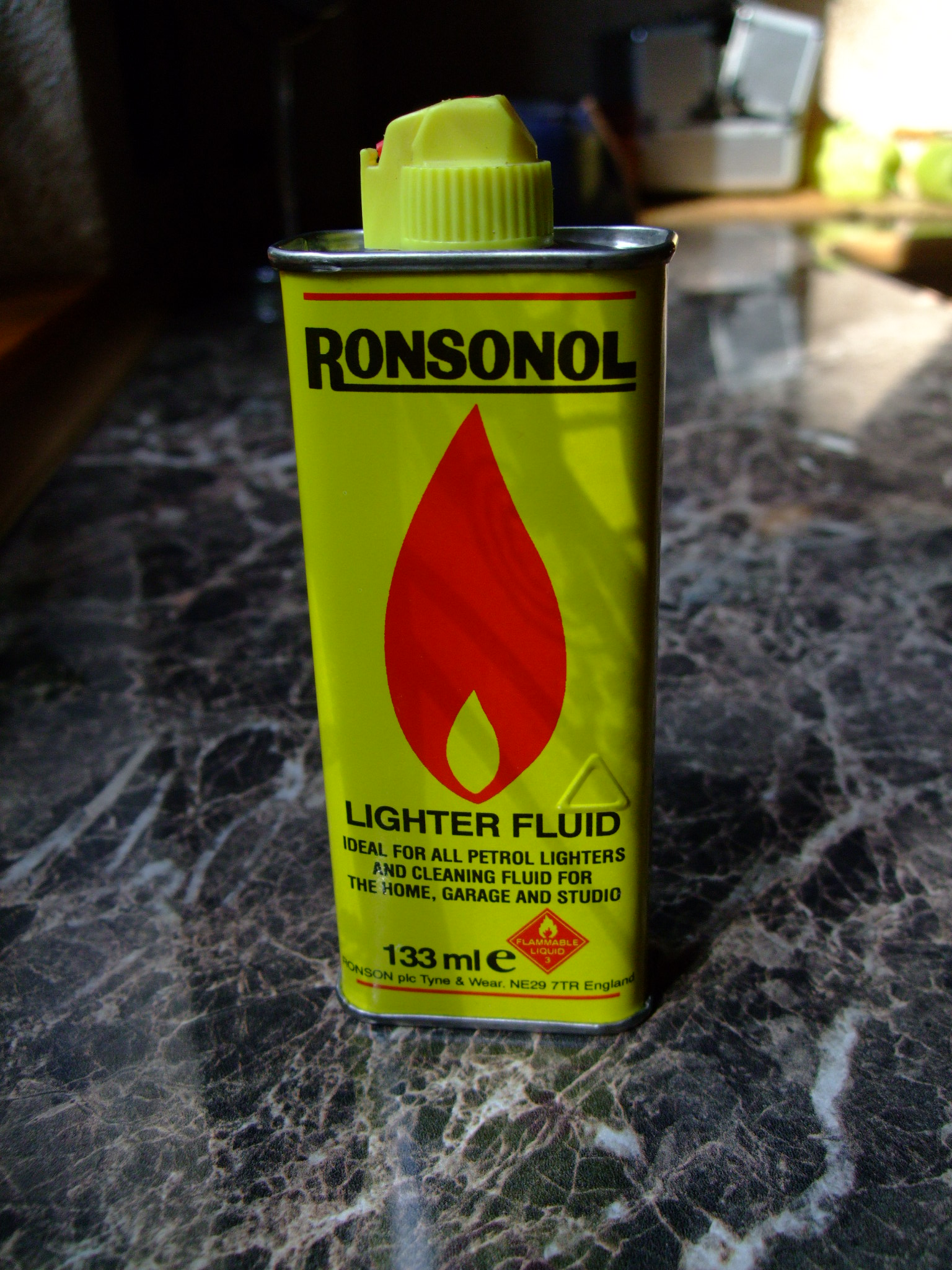
lighter fluid can

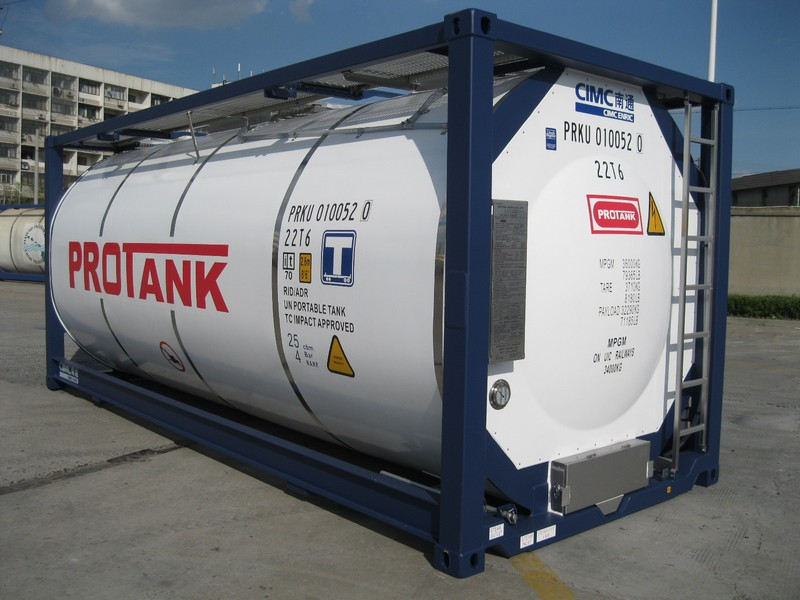
Intermodal tank container

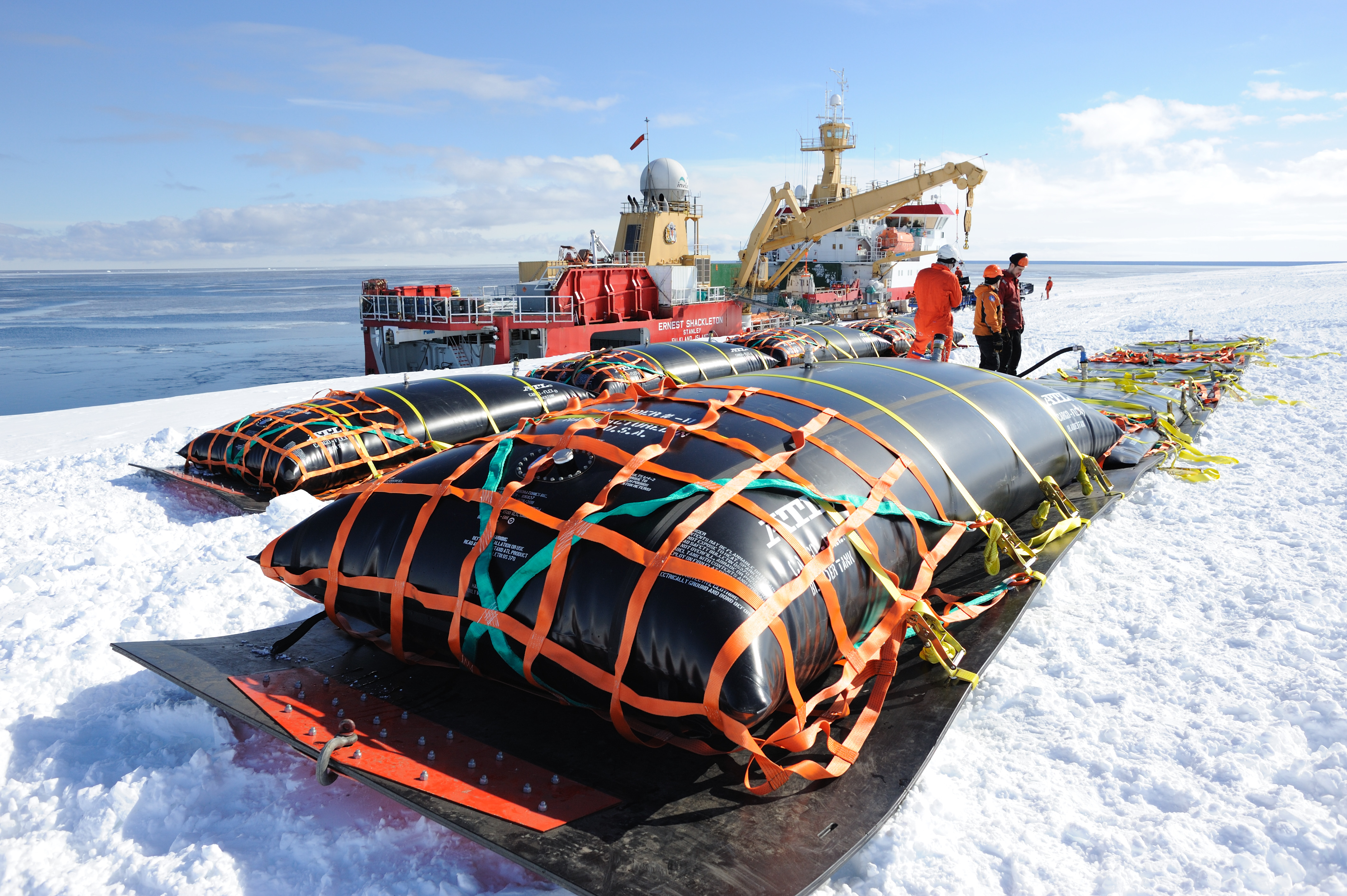
Fuel bladder in Antarctica

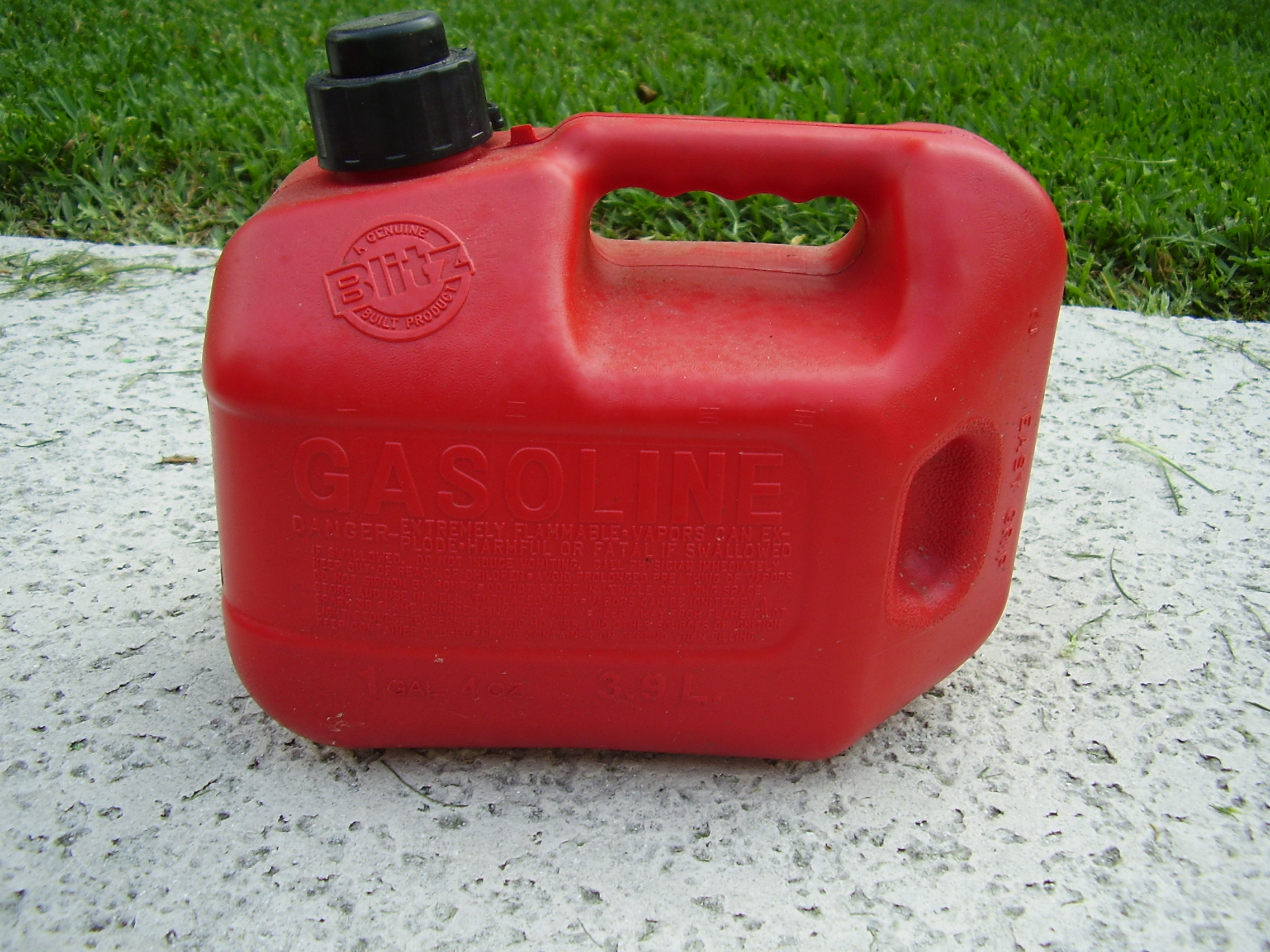
A typical gasoline container.

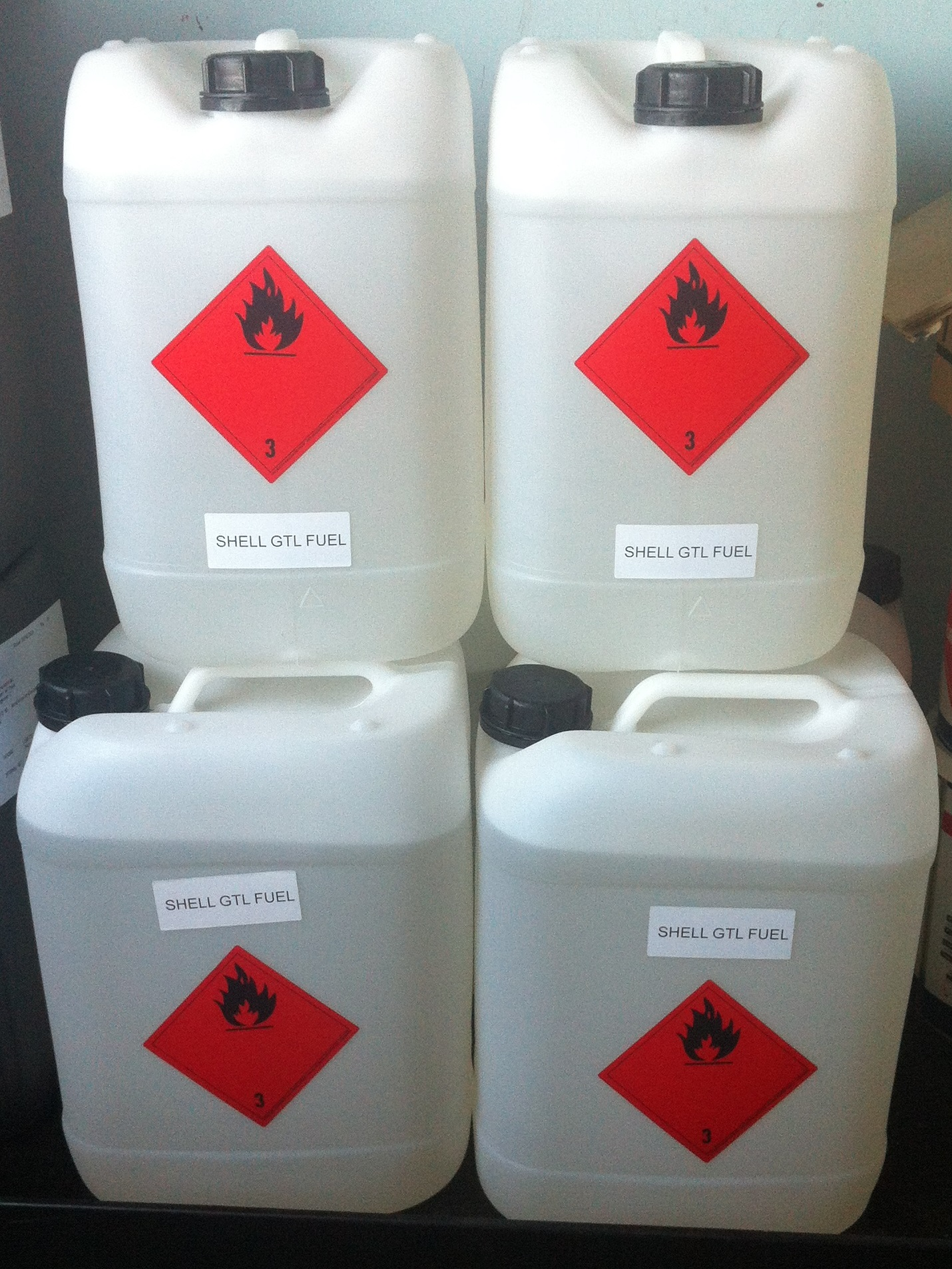
Gas to liquids fuel containers

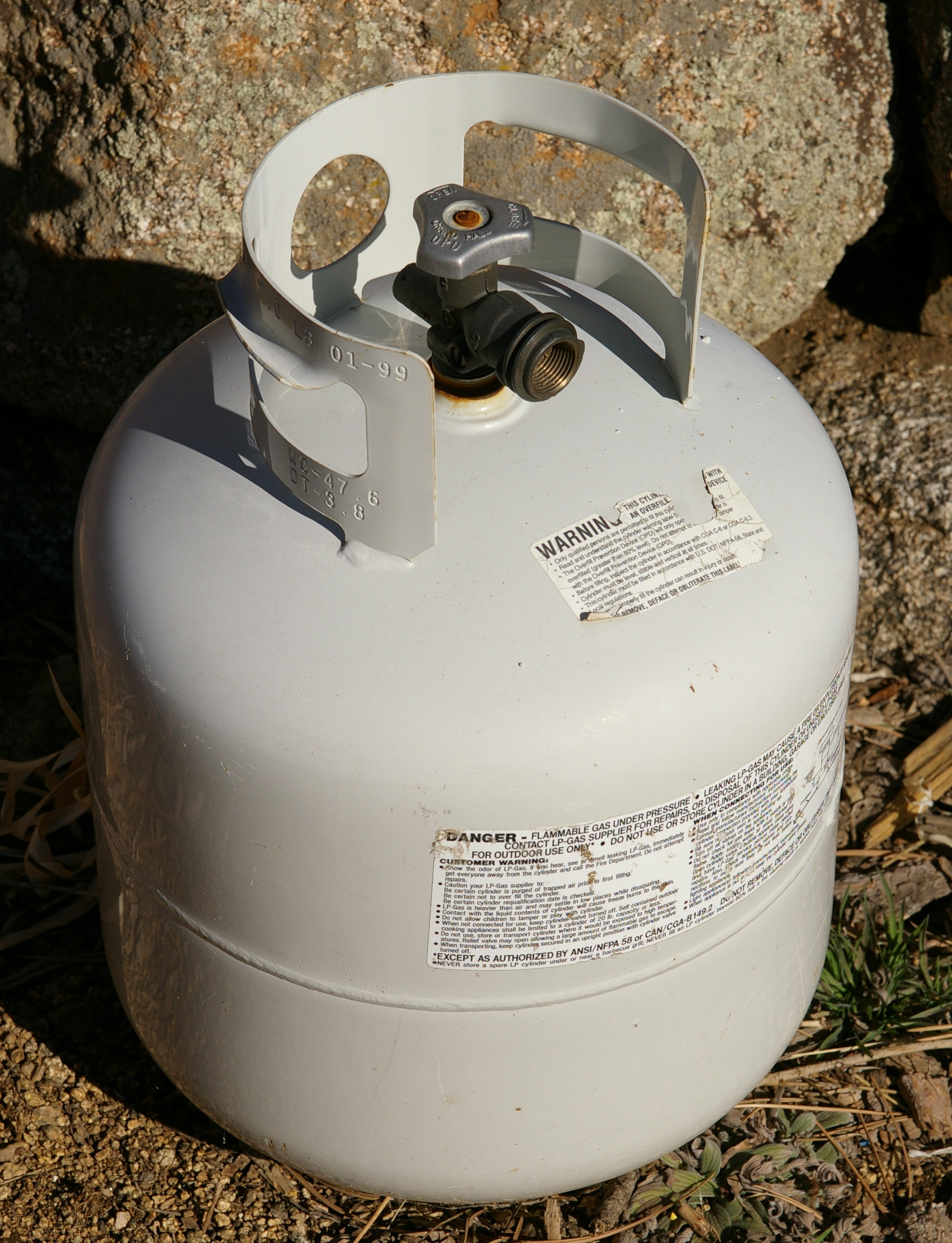
A 20 lb (9.1 kg) steel propane cylinder.

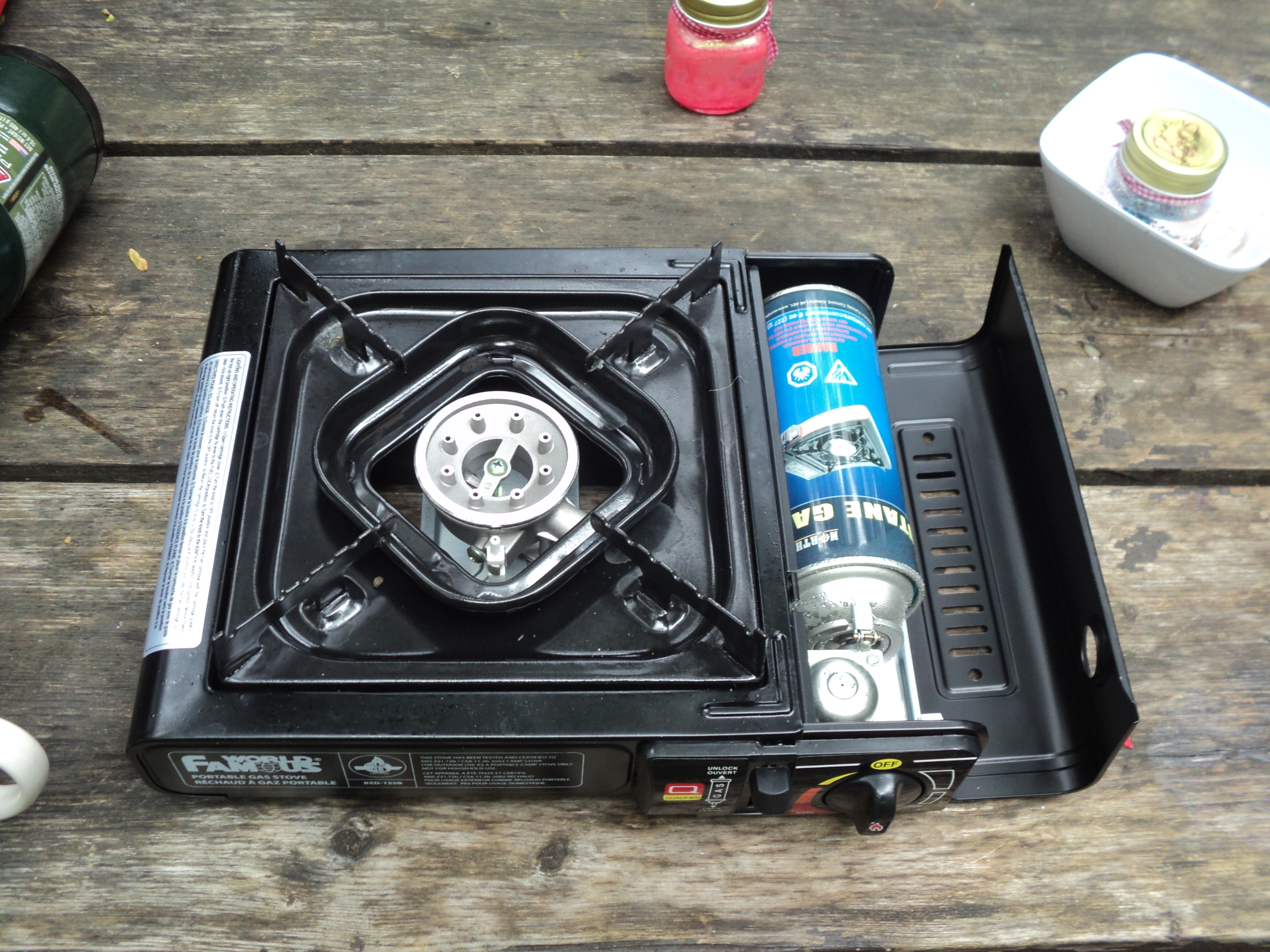
Camp stove with can of butane fuel

== See also ==
- Bottled gas
- Drum pump
- Flammability limit
- Flame arrester
- Fuel tank
- Gas cylinder
- Nuclear flask
- Pressure vessel
- Tank car
- Tank container
- Tank truck
