= Tommy cooker =

British ration heater of WW1/WW2

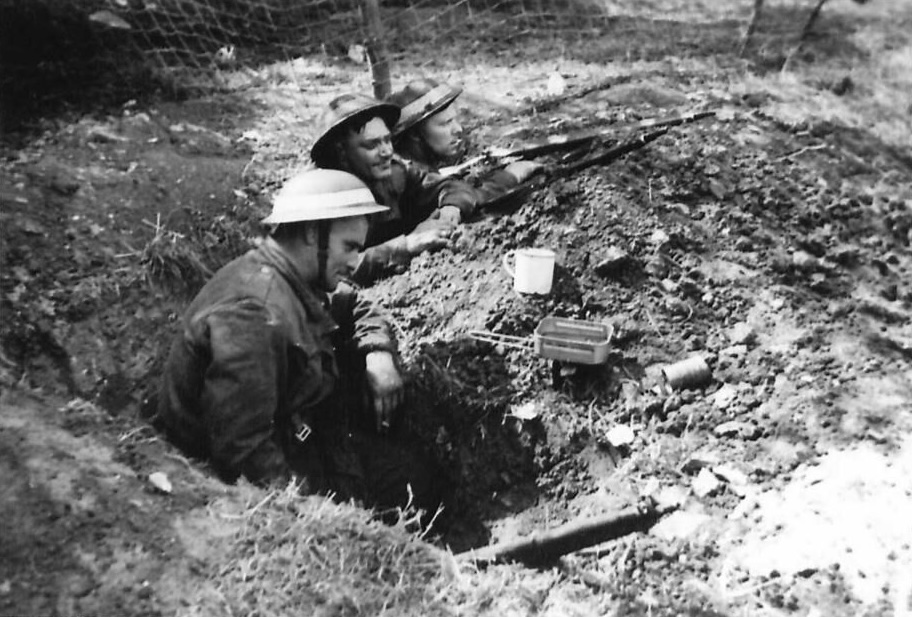
Two soldiers in a trench, boiling water for tea in a mess kit over a Tommy cooker, using solidified methylated spirit blocks as fuel (June 1944)

The Tommy cooker was a compact, portable stove, issued to the troops of the British Army ("Tommies") during World War I and World War II.

After World War II, "Tommy cooker" was alleged to have been used as a derogatory nickname for the M4 Sherman tank, but little to no contemporary evidence exists.

The British Army continued using compact solid fuel stoves until recently when they were replaced by stoves powered by alcohol gel.

== Fuel ==
Tommy cookers were fuelled by a substance referred to as "solidified alcohol"

== World War I ==
During World War I, some soldiers regarded the Tommy cooker as ineffective. One soldier complained that it took two hours to boil half a pint of water. A variety of commercial or improvised alternatives were in use.

=== WWI variants ===
Kampite Trench Fuel Blocks
BRYANT & MAY'S SAFETY TRENCH COOKER, SIX "KAMPITE" TRENCH FUEL BLOCKS
Cardboard box with a folding metal stand.

Anglo's Trench Fires
Folding tin stove fuelled by solid fuel tablets and retailed under the name "Anglo's Trench Fires". Contained in a card box with the slogan "A boon for dugouts, tents and trenches"

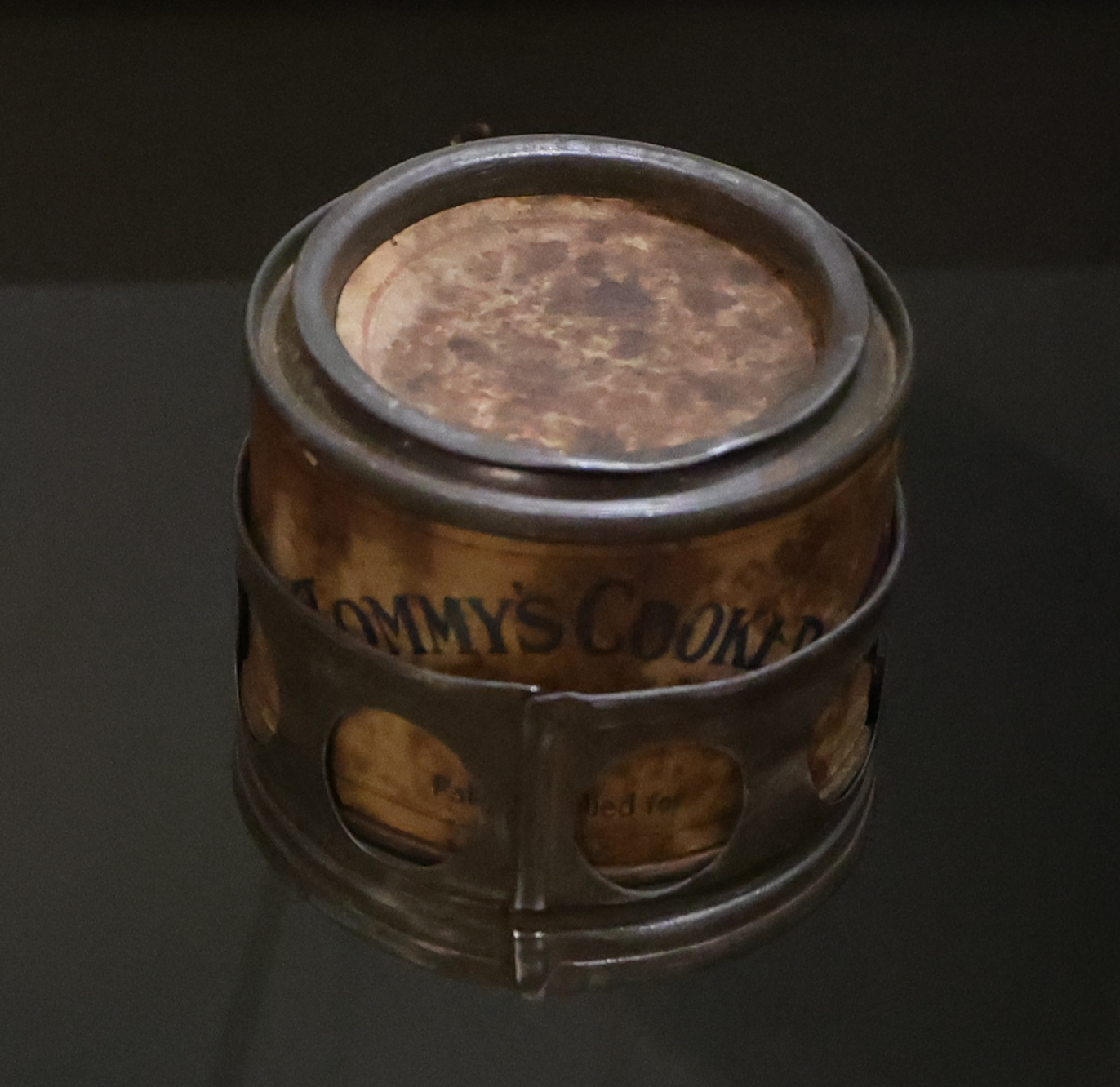
A Tommy's Cooker

Tommy's Cooker
One WWI soldier advised that an extra tin of fuel should be provisioned: "My Pack contained the following items. ...A tin containing extra solidified methylated spirits (i.e. Refill for a "Tommy's Cooker.")"

Tinned Heat - solidified methylated spirits
"Tinned Heat' was a little round tin pocket stove, or "Campaigner's Cooker". Only 3.5 inches (8.9 cm) in diameter and 1.5 inches (3.8 cm), it contained solidified methylated spirits. It was deemed to be perfectly safe, quite practical and absolutely efficient –an ideal arrangement for the trenches, If anything could be pronounced ideal in such circumstances. Tinned Heat cost 10½d each."

Canned Heat - Sterno solidified alcohol
Invented around 1900, Sterno is made from ethanol, methanol, water and an amphoteric oxide gelling agent, plus a dye that gives it a characteristic pink color. Designed to be odorless, a 7 oz (200 g) can will burn for up to two hours. The methanol is added to denature the product, which essentially is intended to make it too toxic for consumption, thus the British term 'Methylated Spirits'.

=== WW1 Manufacturers ===
The British cookers were made by Tommy's Cooker Co., Limited, The Little Kitchener Co. and the "Pals" Cooker by Matthias Jackson & Sons.

- "ThePALS" Cooker (Solidified Spirit Pocket Stove). The name "ThePALS" is our registered trade mark. "ThePALS" Kettle or Pan rests is our registered design. – Solidified Spirit Pocket Stove for the "Pals" at the Front! – Far away the BEST STOVE Made. – Hot water and food quickly and easily prepared by using "THE PALS" COOKER! Superior quality. Clean and powerful. A new design. Compact and handy. A welcome gift. – "The composition of this solid spirit is a new and exclusive preparation."—COMPLETE STOVE RETAILS at 1/- EACH. REFILLS RETAIL AT 1/- and 2/- PER TIN. – Sole Manufacturers: MATTHIAS JACKSON & SONS, Shepley Street Works, London Road, Manchester. (1916 Ad)
- Tommy's Cooker. (British Made, Patent Applied For) – A Marvel of Simplicity & Utility—Is the most welcome gift to soldiers in the trenches... Give him one before he leaves for the front. ...For preparing food out of doors it is perfection. – Used by the British, Belgian and French Army in the Field, and the Red Cross Society. – Price, 1/- Refills, 2/- ADVANTAGES.—1. Wind does not blow it out. 2. Composition unaffected by weather or climate. 3. Stand carries heavy pots or pans. – Tommy's Cooker Co. Ld. – Works 31 Carburton St., London, W. (1916 Ad)
- Little Kitchener Trench Cooker—Blackie Brand Always Best—Jelled fuel "Blackie Brand" Patent Tommy Cooker that has seen use from the Sudan of the 1880s. – Sole Proprietor Robert Blackie of London (who also produced Military Foot Powder in Tins) (The Cooker consist of a cooking ring that sits on the fuel container and is extremely lightweight)

== World War II ==
Refined versions of the Tommy cooker remained in use during World War II, and were still generally known as Tommy cookers. They used gelled fuel in a tin can; a steel ring fitted to the can supported a mess tin.

=== WWII Variants ===
Tommy cookers came in a number of different forms. The two most popular designs used were:

Blackie
Self contained 'gel fuel' version in a small tin and attachable pot stand. There were also similar commercial stoves sold as the "Tommy's Cooker" and the "Blackie".

Hexi Cooker
Small field tri-fold stove fuelled by solid fuel discs (similar to heximine fuel). A cylindrical tin container, an inscription reads; "SOLID FUEL COOKER (Stand, Disc & Tablets), INSTRUCTIONS INSIDE". The tin is black and measures 4.5 in (110 mm) high and 2.5 in (64 mm) in diameter. The entire item weighs 309 g (10.9 oz).

The instructions inside are like a newspaper cutting and say the following;

- DIRECTIONS FOR USE
- 1. Remove stand from this container and open out legs equally.
- 2. Place (hinge downwards) on level non-inflammable surface.
- 3. Remove metal disc from this container and fix on stand immediately above hinge so that the three slots cut in the edge of disc lock firmly on legs of stand.
- 4. Place one fuel tablet on metal disc and ignite with match, lighter etc.
- 5. To extinguish, tip tablet off stand and cover with lid.
- 6. If greater heat required, break tablet into two or more pieces and stand these upright on the disc. If less heat required, break off small piece and use instead of whole tablet.
- NOTES
- (a) It is essential to shield cooker from all draughts, using box, tin etc. or heating may be carried out in a shallow trench.
- (b) If used in a covered accommodation, allow adequate ventilation to assist combustion and to remove fumes.

== Replacement ==
Until recently, the British Army still used compact portable hexamine fuel tablet stoves; they were replaced with BCB Fire Dragon alcohol gel fuel stoves.

== Nickname for Sherman tank ==
The term is also alleged to have been applied by German tank crews as a derogatory nickname for the Sherman tank whose earlier models acquired a reputation for bursting into flames when hit, due to improper ammunition storage; the only evidence is anecdotal.

== See also ==
- Benghazi burner
- List of stoves
