= Jerrycan =

Robust pressed steel liquid container

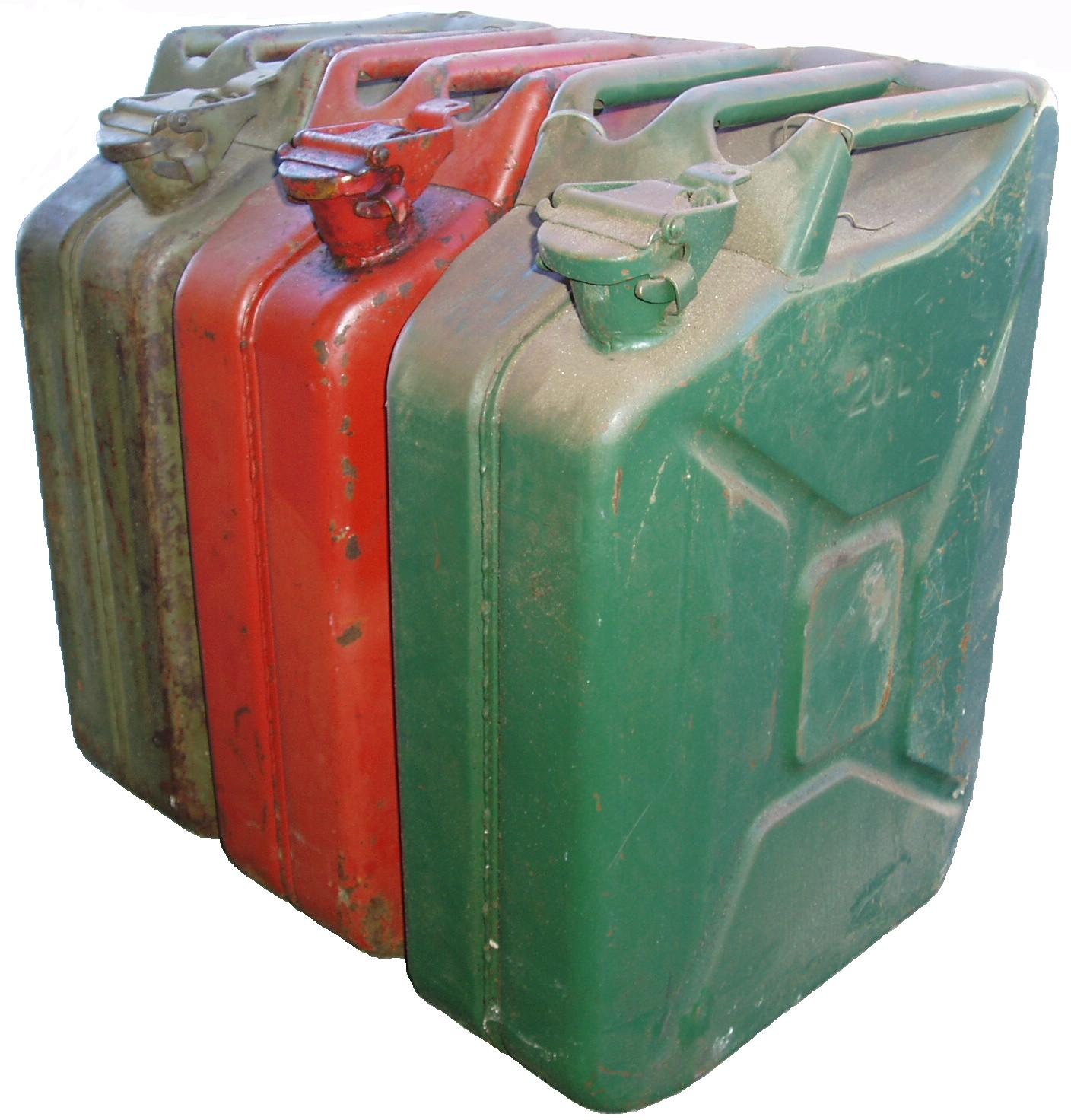
Stamped indentations stiffen the sides and allow expansion of the contents. Different colours designate the contents.

A jerrycan or jerrican (also styled jerry can or jerri can) is a fuel container made from pressed steel (and more recently, high density polyethylene). It was designed in Germany in the 1930s for military use, to hold 20 litres (4.4 imp gal; 5.3 US gal) of fuel or water, and saw widespread use by both Germany and the Allies during the Second World War.

The development of the jerrycan was a significant improvement on earlier designs, which required tools and funnels to use, and it contained many innovative features for convenience of use and robustness. Similar designs are used worldwide for fuel and water containers, in both military and civilian contexts.

== History ==
The name of the jerrycan refers to its German origins, Jerry being slang for Germans. The design was reverse engineered and subsequently copied, with minor modifications, by the Allies during the Second World War.

=== German invention ===
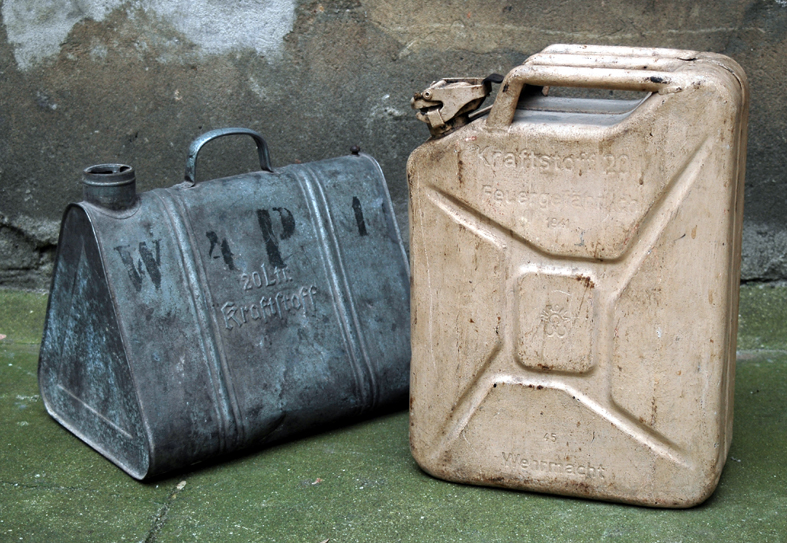
German 20 litre fuel containers: earlier container (left); Wehrmacht-Einheitskanister of 1941, manufacturer: Nirona (right)

The Wehrmacht-Einheitskanister ("Armed forces standard canister"), as it was known in Germany, was first developed in 1937 by the Müller engineering firm in Schwelm to a design by their chief engineer Vinzenz Grünvogel. A similar design was used in 1936 during the Spanish Civil War, where they had a company logo for Ambi-Budd Presswerk GmbH. Among others, the Wehrmacht had specified that a soldier should be able to carry either two full containers or four empty ones, which is the reason the triple handles were fitted. To achieve the required filling and draining speed, it was fitted with a large spout and flip top closure. A hole in the closure retainer made it possible to fit a securing pin or wire with a lead seal. The rectangular shape made it stackable. The recessed welded seam stiffened the container and protected the seam from impact damage. The indentations ensured a full can would not be severely damaged when falling from a vehicle, while a dip coat of paint on the inside protected it from corrosion.

By 1939 the German military had thousands of such cans stockpiled in anticipation of war. Motorised troops were issued the cans with lengths of rubber hose in order to siphon fuel from any available source, a way to aid their rapid invasion of Poland at the start of the Second World War.

=== American adaptation ===
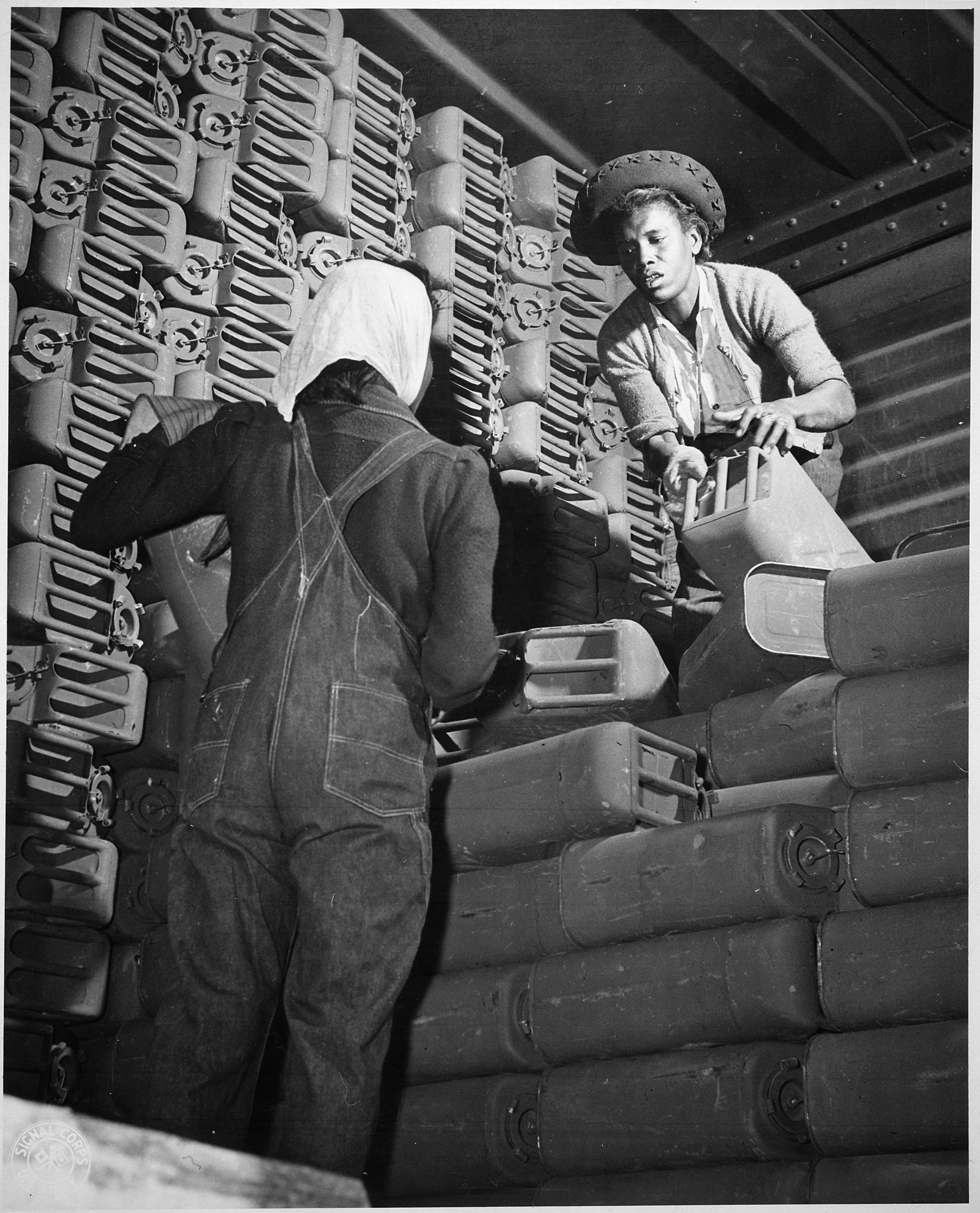
US-style jerrycans at Savannah Quartermaster Depot, Savannah, Georgia, 1943

In 1939 American engineer Paul Pleiss had built a vehicle to journey to India with his German colleague but they realised they did not have any storage for emergency water. The German engineer had access to the stockpile of jerrycans at Berlin Tempelhof Airport and managed to take three of them. The German engineer also gave Pleiss complete specifications for the manufacture of the can. Pleiss continued on to Calcutta, put his car in storage and flew back to Philadelphia, where he told American military officials about the can. He could raise no interest. Without a sample he realised he could not get anywhere. He eventually shipped the car to New York by a roundabout method and sent a can to Washington. The War Department decided instead to use World War I ten-US-gallon (38 L; 8.3 imp gal) cans with two screw closures, which required both a spanner and funnel for pouring.

The one jerrycan in American possession was sent to Camp Holabird, Maryland, where it was redesigned. The new design retained the handles, size and shape but is most easily distinguishable from the German original by the simplified "X" stiffening indentations in the sides of the can. The US can could be stacked interchangeably with German or British cans. The German recessed welded seam was replaced with rolled seams, which were prone to leakage. For fuel cans the lining was removed and a spanner and funnel were required. A similar water can was also adopted, with a flip-top lid and enamel lining.

The US-designed jerrycan was widely used by US Army and Marine Corps units. In all overseas theatres fuel and other petroleum products represented about 50% of all supply needs measured by weight. In the European Theatre of Operations alone, over 19 million were required to support US forces by May 1945.

A single standard US 2.5 ton truck could carry 875 US gallons (3,310 L) of fuel loaded in jerrycans. US logisticians requested more than 1.3 million per month to replace losses; these cans were provided by US and British manufacturers but supply could not keep up with demand. Loss of jerrycans in units was severe, with 3.5 million reported 'lost' in October 1944 for example. At one point in August 1944 lack of cans (caused by losses) limited the supply of fuel that could be brought forward to combat units, even though the fuel was available in rear areas.

The US design was slightly lighter than the German can (10 pounds (4.5 kg) v. 11.5 lb (5.2 kg) for the German version). These fuel containers were subsequently used in all theatres of war around the world. Such was the appreciation of the cans in the war effort that President Franklin Roosevelt noted, "Without these cans it would have been impossible for our armies to cut their way across France at a lightning pace which exceeded the German Blitzkrieg of 1940."

=== British necessity ===
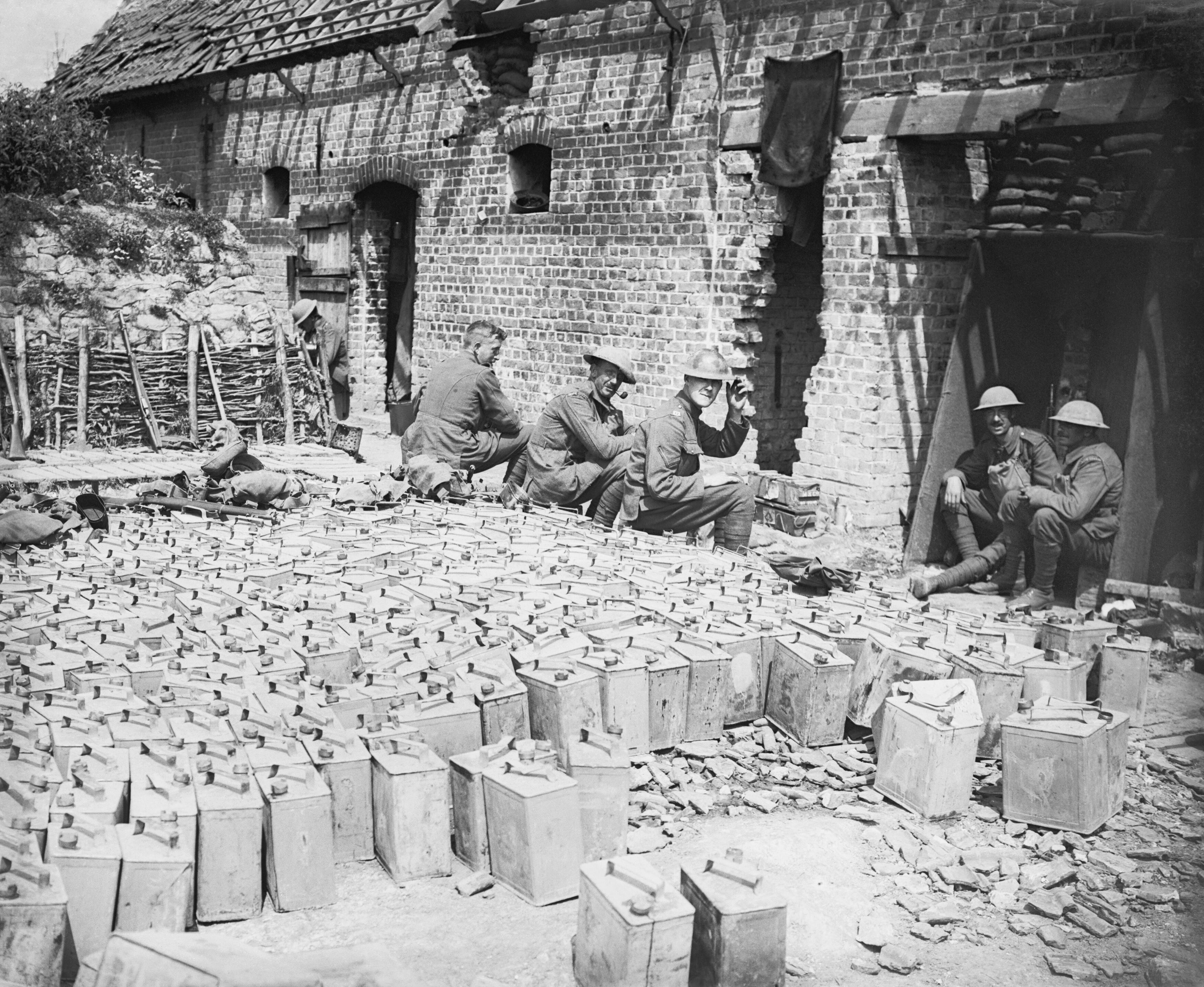
British pressed steel, two-imperial-gallon (9 L) petrol cans: Strong, but heavy and expensive (1917)

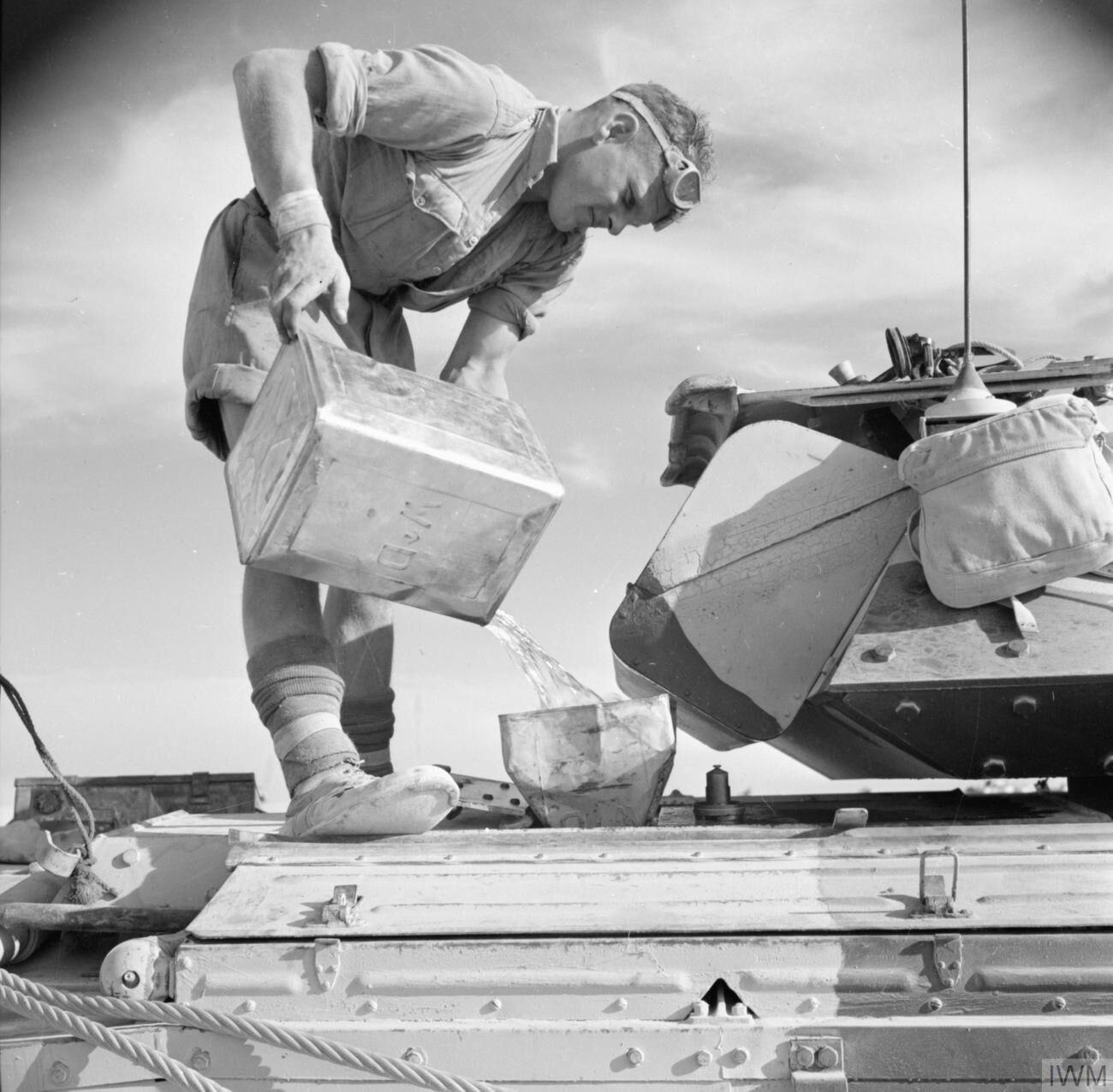
British tin plate, four-imperial-gallon (18 L) petrol tin ("Flimsy"). Inexpensive, but weak, with a tendency to leak (c. 1942).

At the beginning of the Second World War the British Army was equipped with two simple fuel containers: the two-imperial-gallon (9.1 L; 2.4 US gal) container made of pressed steel, and the four-imperial-gallon (18 L; 4.8 US gal) container made from tin plate. The two-gallon containers were relatively strong, but were expensive to produce. Manufactured primarily in Egypt, the four-gallon containers were plentiful and inexpensive, but they had a tendency to leak after minor damage. Early four-gallon containers were packed in pairs in wooden cases. When stacked, the timber framing protected the tins and prevented the upper layers of tins from crushing the lower. As the war progressed, the wooden case was replaced with either thin plywood or cardboard cases, neither of which provided much protection. four-gallon containers carrying fuel were hazardous to the cargo ships carrying them. The leaking fuel would accumulate in cargo holds. At least one such ship exploded.

Though adequate for transport along European roads, the four-gallon containers proved extremely unsatisfactory during the North African Campaign. The crimped or soldered seams easily split during transport, especially off-road over the rock-strewn deserts of North Africa. In addition, the containers were easily punctured by even minor trauma. Because of these problems the troops referred to the four-gallon containers as flimsies. Transport of fuel over rough terrain often resulted in as much as 25% of the fuel being lost through seam failures or punctures. Fuel leaks gave vehicles a propensity to catch fire. The containers were routinely discarded after a single use, and severely hampered the operation of the British Eighth Army. A more successful and popular use for the four-gallon container was to convert it into a cooking stove, referred to as the 'Benghazi burner'.

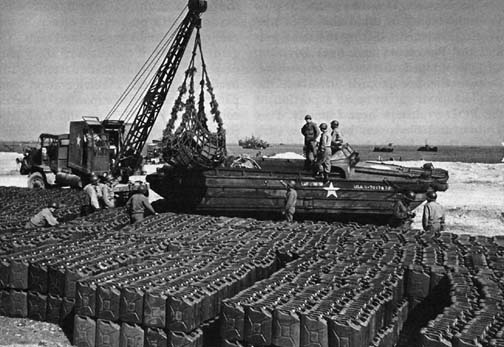
British fuel jerrycans used in April 1944 during training in England in preparation of the Allied landings in Normandy

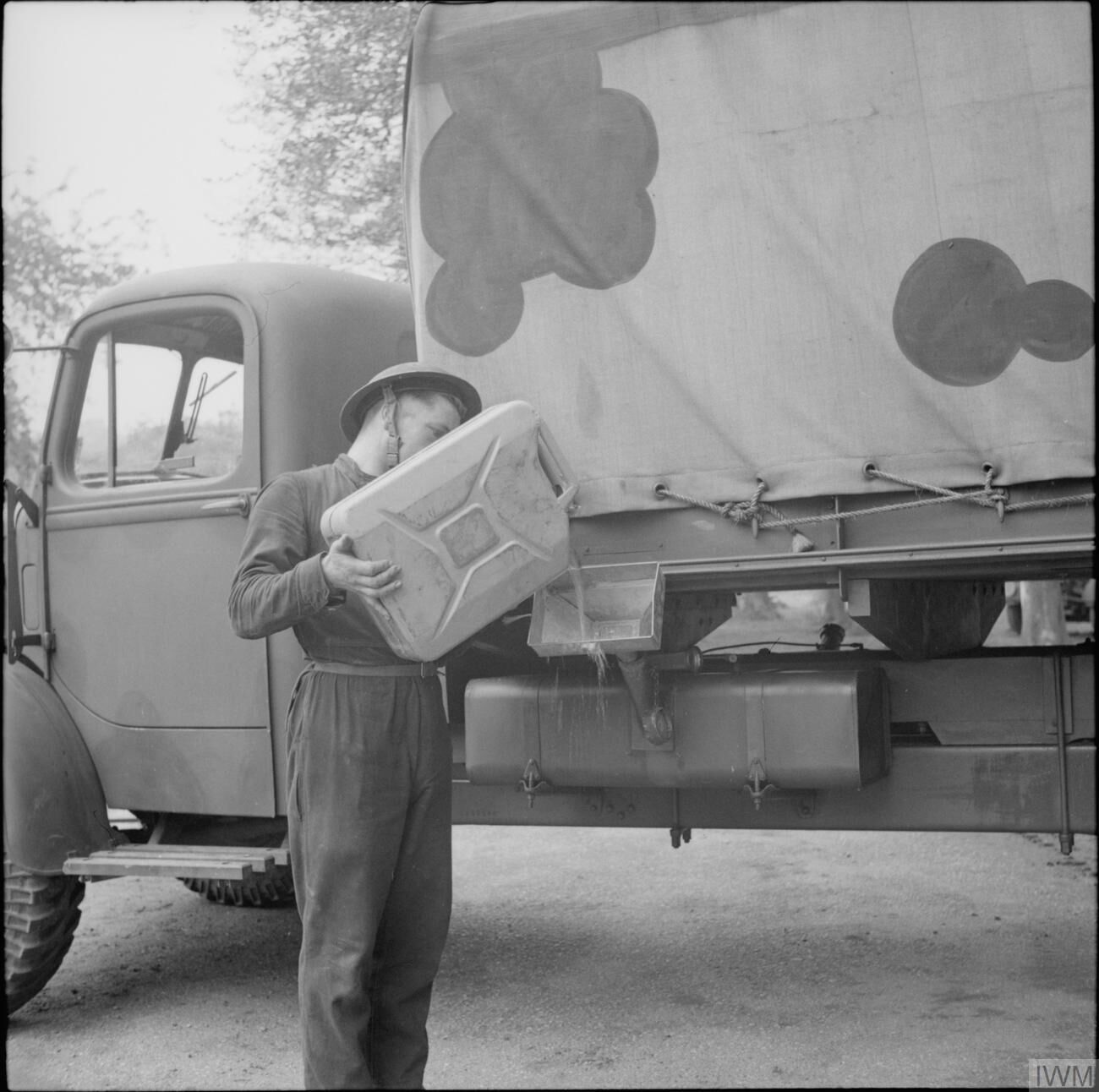
British soldier refueling a lorry with petrol from a jerrycan

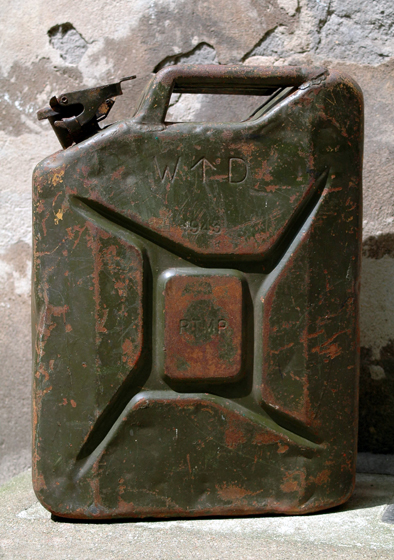
British copy of the German design

When the British Army first saw the German fuel cans during the Norwegian Campaign in 1940, they immediately saw the advantages of the superior design. The three handles allowed easy handling by one or two people, or movement bucket brigade-style. The handle design also allows for two empty cans to be carried in each hand, utilizing the right outer handle on the one and the left outer handle on the other.

The sides of the can were marked with cross-like indentations that strengthened the can while allowing the contents to expand, as did an air pocket under the handles when the can was filled correctly. This air pocket allowed the container to float if dropped in water. Rather than a screw cap, the containers used a cam lever release mechanism with a short spout secured with a snap closure and an air-pipe to the air pocket, which enabled smooth pouring (and which was omitted in some copies). The interior was also lined with an impervious plastic, first developed for steel beer barrels, that would allow the can to be used for either water or petrol. The can was welded and had a gasket for a leak-proof mouth.

The British used cans captured from the "Jerries" (slang for Germans), hence "jerrycans", in preference to their own containers as much as possible. Later in 1940, Pleiss was in London and British officers asked him about the design and manufacture of the jerrycan. Pleiss ordered the second of his three jerrycans flown to London. After the second capture of Benghazi at the end of 1941, large numbers of Axis jerrycans were captured, sufficient to equip some units such as the Long Range Desert Group.

British companies such as Briggs Motor Bodies, Vauxhall Motors and the Pressed Steel Company manufactured copies of the German design.

=== Soviet usage ===
The strength of the Wehrmachtskanister was also recognised in the Soviet Union. Its design was later copied and the Soviet Army accepted it as the standard container for liquids. This container is still being produced and used in modern Russia. In civilian use this container is used primarily for automotive fuel and lubricants.

== Design ==
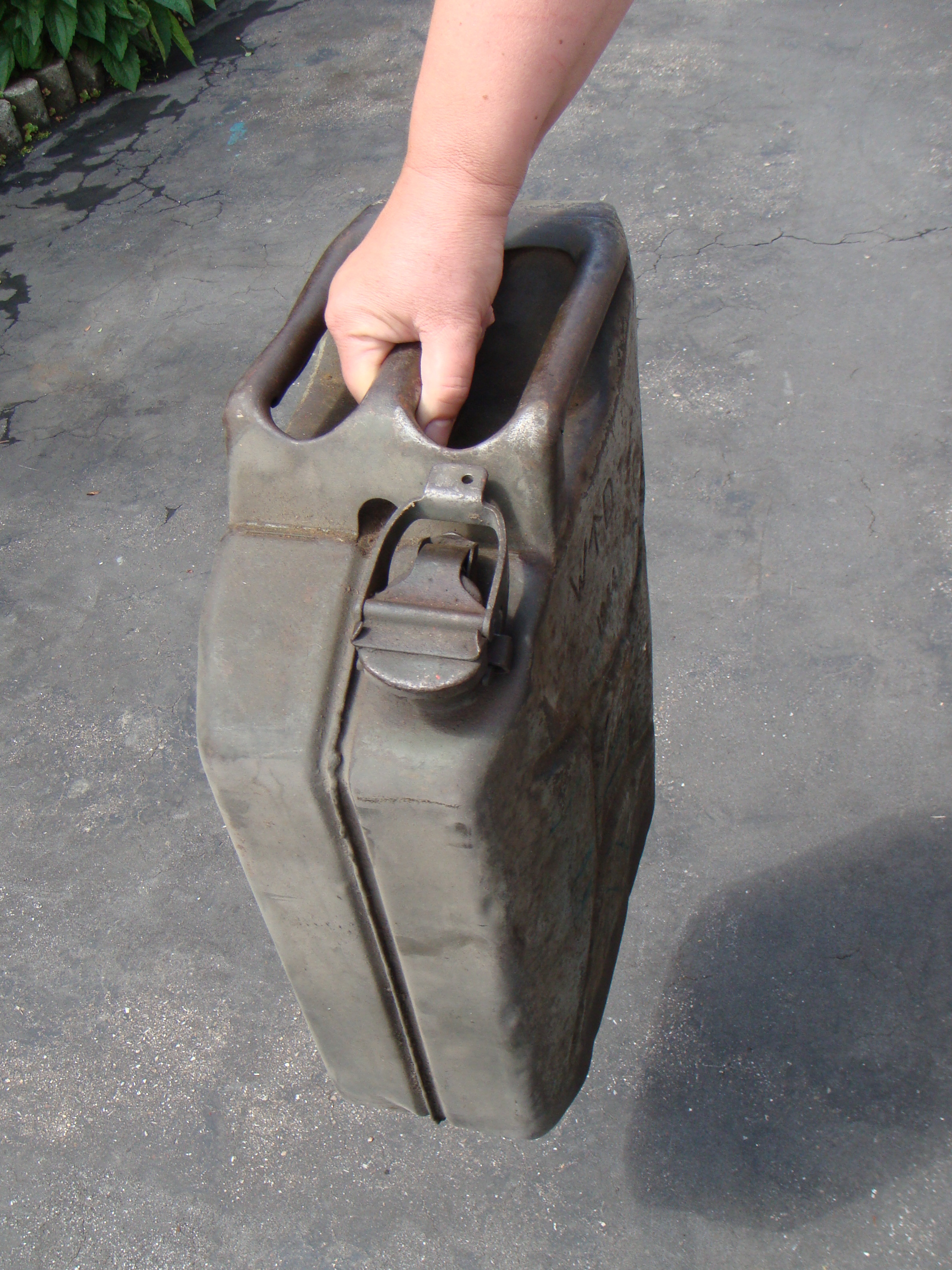
Carried by one person

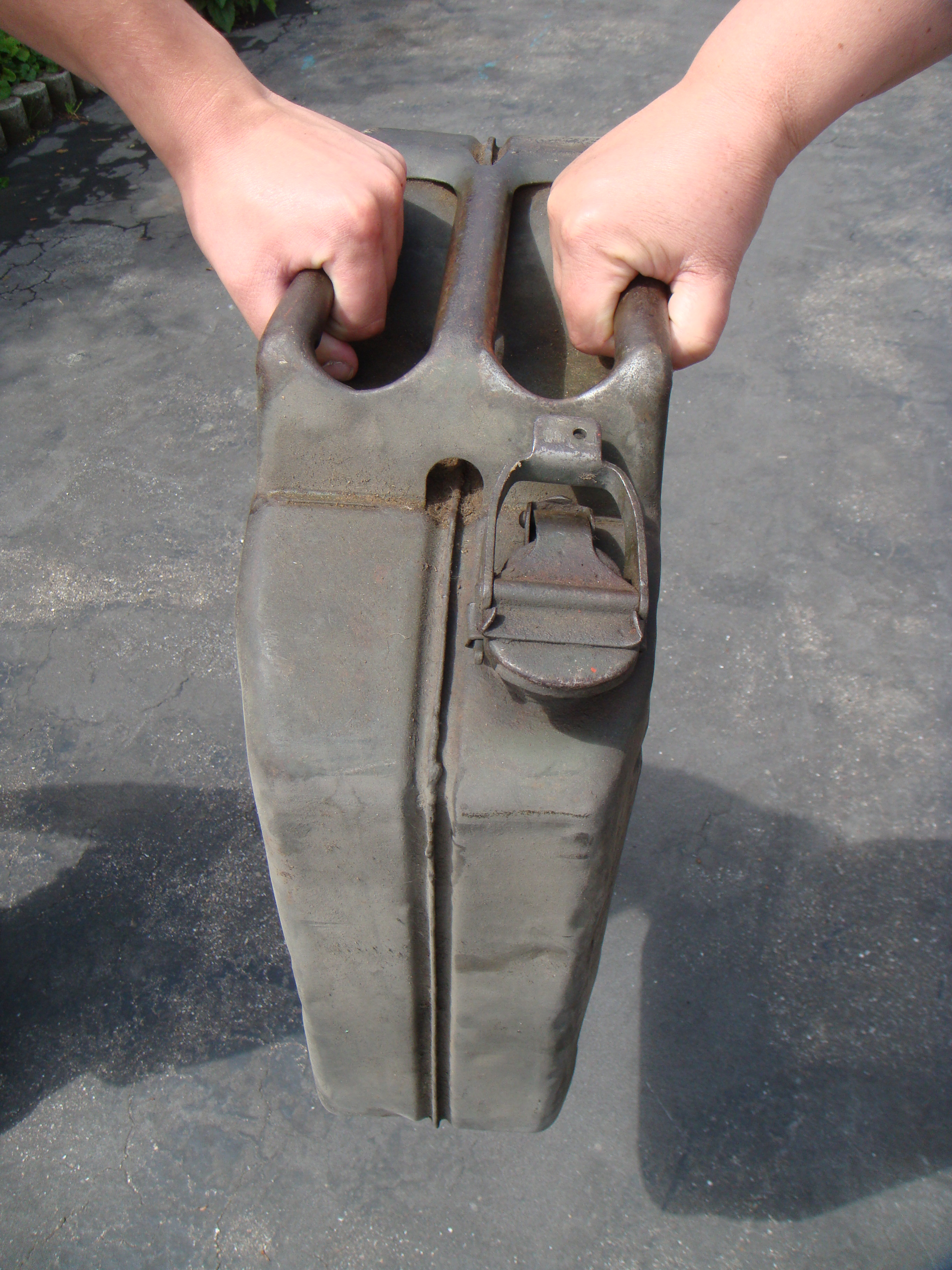
Carried by two people

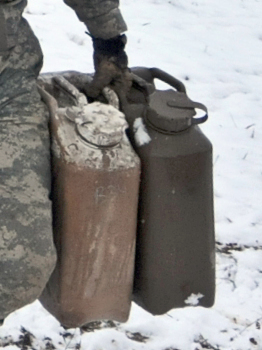
Two carried by one person

Jerrycans typically have a rounded rectangular cross section with package handles. Most have three handles, allowing one person to carry four cans (two in each hand), and to make them easier to move by a chain of people.

The cans were originally intended as fuel containers, but their usage has widened. This can be indicated by can colour, affixed labels, or occasionally, molded labelling, intended to prevent contamination of the contents by different fuels or mixing fuel with water.

The US version of the jerrycan has military specification MIL-C-1283 F produced since the early 1940s by a number of US manufacturers, according to one manufacturer, Blitz. The National Stock Number 7240-00-222-3088 is considered obsolete since new specification A-A-59592 B, covering high-density polyethylene versions.

== Modern use ==
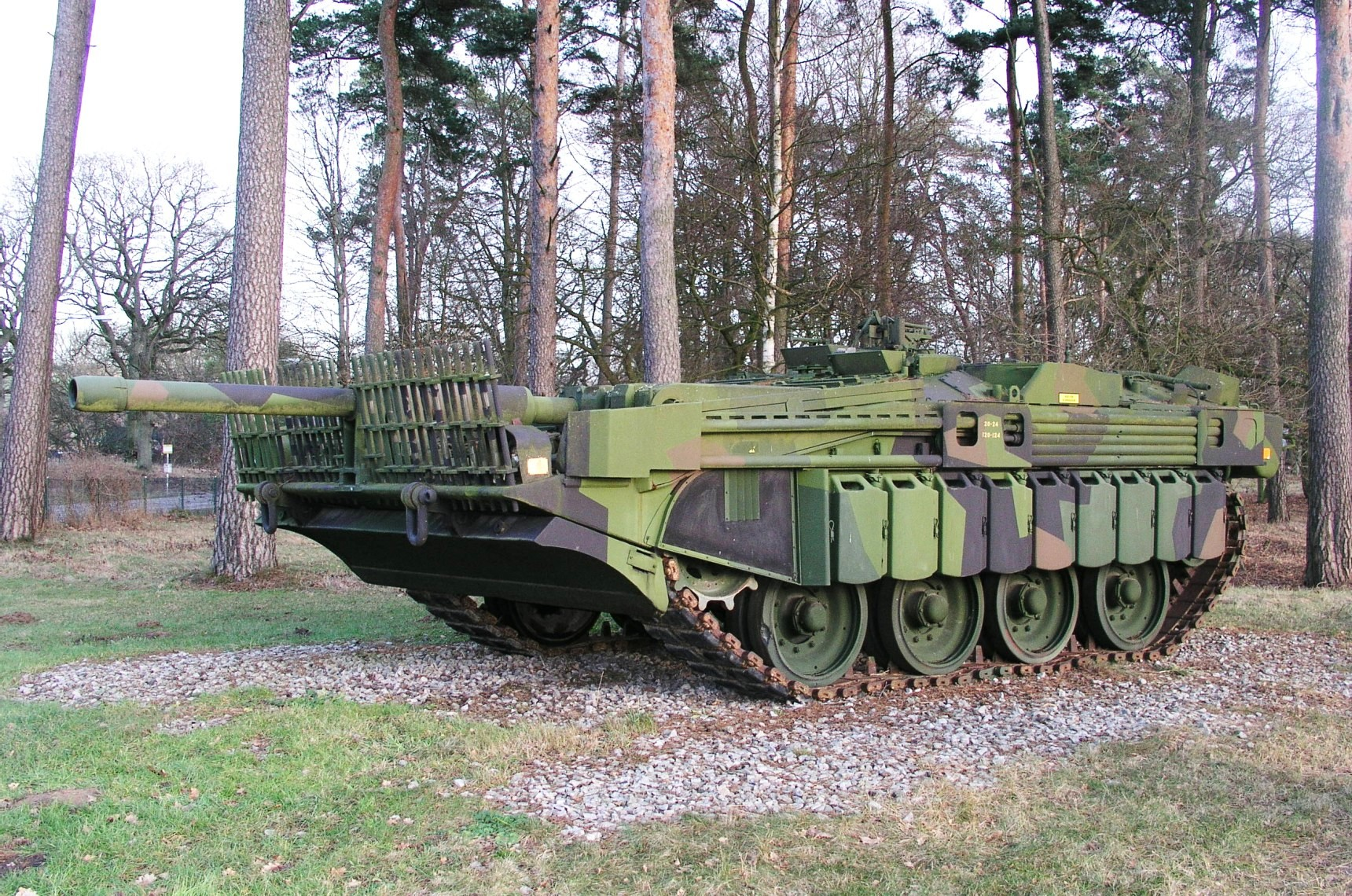
Nine examples of a Swedish adaptation of the jerrycan are stored on each side of a Stridsvagn 103C.

The German design jerrycan is still a standard container for fuel and other liquids in the armies of the NATO countries.

Finnish designer Eero Rislakki designed a plastic jerrycan in 1970 with a small screwable stopper on the top side behind the handle to allow air flowing in to ensure smooth fuel outflow. It is lighter than the original design yet almost as sturdy.

== Regulations ==
=== United States ===
The jerrycan is defined by the Code of Federal Regulation, 49 CFR 171.8 as "a metal or plastic packaging of rectangular or polygonal cross-section". As of 10 January 2009 all portable fuel containers are required to conform to two new regulations:

1. They must meet new federal Mobile Source Air Toxics regulations, based on the California Air Resources Board's regulations.
2. They must meet the requirements of the Children's Gasoline Burn Prevention Act.

These new regulations do not apply to OSHA-approved metal safety containers, but rather to the common red plastic, portable gas cans. The regulations apply only to newly manufactured petrol cans, and there is no requirement on the part of users to discard their existing cans or to upgrade, although the EPA provides informational resources for implementing community Gas Can Exchange Programs. Furthermore, in the state of California, the following colours are mandated:

1. Gasoline: red;
2. Diesel: yellow; and
3. Kerosene: blue.

Per ASTM F852, the particular shades should be "medium yellow" and "medium blue".

=== Europe ===
The transportation of dangerous goods (which includes liquid fuels) within Europe is governed by the UN European Agreement concerning the International Carriage of Dangerous Goods by Road (ADR). The term "jerrican" is defined within Chapter 1.2 of the 2011 ADR as "a metal or plastics packaging of rectangular or polygonal cross-section with one or more orifices", a definition which includes the traditional jerrycan but which also covers a wide range of other packagings. The ADR sets performance standards for packaging and specifies what standard of packaging is required for each type of dangerous good, including petrol and diesel fuels. The traditional jerrycan is available in UN-marked approved versions which satisfy the requirements of the ADR.
