= Formula One car =

Class of formula race car

A Formula One car or F1 car is a single-seater, open-cockpit, open-wheel formula racing car used to compete in Formula One racing events. A typical F1 car is characterised by substantial front and rear wings, large wheels, and turbocharged engines positioned behind the driver. The cars are constructed of carbon fibre and other composite materials for durability and are built to withstand high impact forces and considerable G forces.

Early F1 cars were simpler in design with no wings, front mounted engines. These cars also required significant driver effort for control. Later improvements saw the introduction of lighter cars as resulted by metallurgical advancements, introduction of ground effect, and the addition of wings and other aerodynamic devices, and control electronics. The introduction of turbocharged engines in the sport along with higher efficiency, and energy recovery systems to boost speeds, led to faster and more efficient F1 cars.

Modern F1 cars are composed of carbon fibre monocoques with open cockpits consisting of a single driver seat and detachable steering. An F1 power unit, a 1.6 L turbo hybrid V6 engine, is capable of producing up to 950 hp (710 kW). This enables the car to reach speeds of up to 375 km/h (233 mph). It uses a semi-automatic gear box with an eight-speed transmission and electro-hydraulic components for steering the car. The 18-inch wheels are fitted with slick tyres during normal dry conditions, and are fitted with carbon disc brakes capable of handling temperatures of up to 1,000 °C (1,830 °F). The wings act as inverted aerofoils to produce negative lift, resulting in increased down force.

The regulations governing the cars are specified by the FIA and have undergone considerable changes since their introduction in the late 1940s. The cars are constructed and operated by the constructors in racing events, though the design and manufacture can be outsourced. Since the 2000s, several changes have been made by the FIA, which are aimed at sustainability and cost reduction, such as the cap on car parts, usage of mixed fuel, and usage of energy recovery systems. It has also sought to reduce the downforce and limit speeds, while simplifying car design and improving close racing. Cars have also been made safer with durable materials, improvement in safety features and the recent addition of the halo.

== History ==
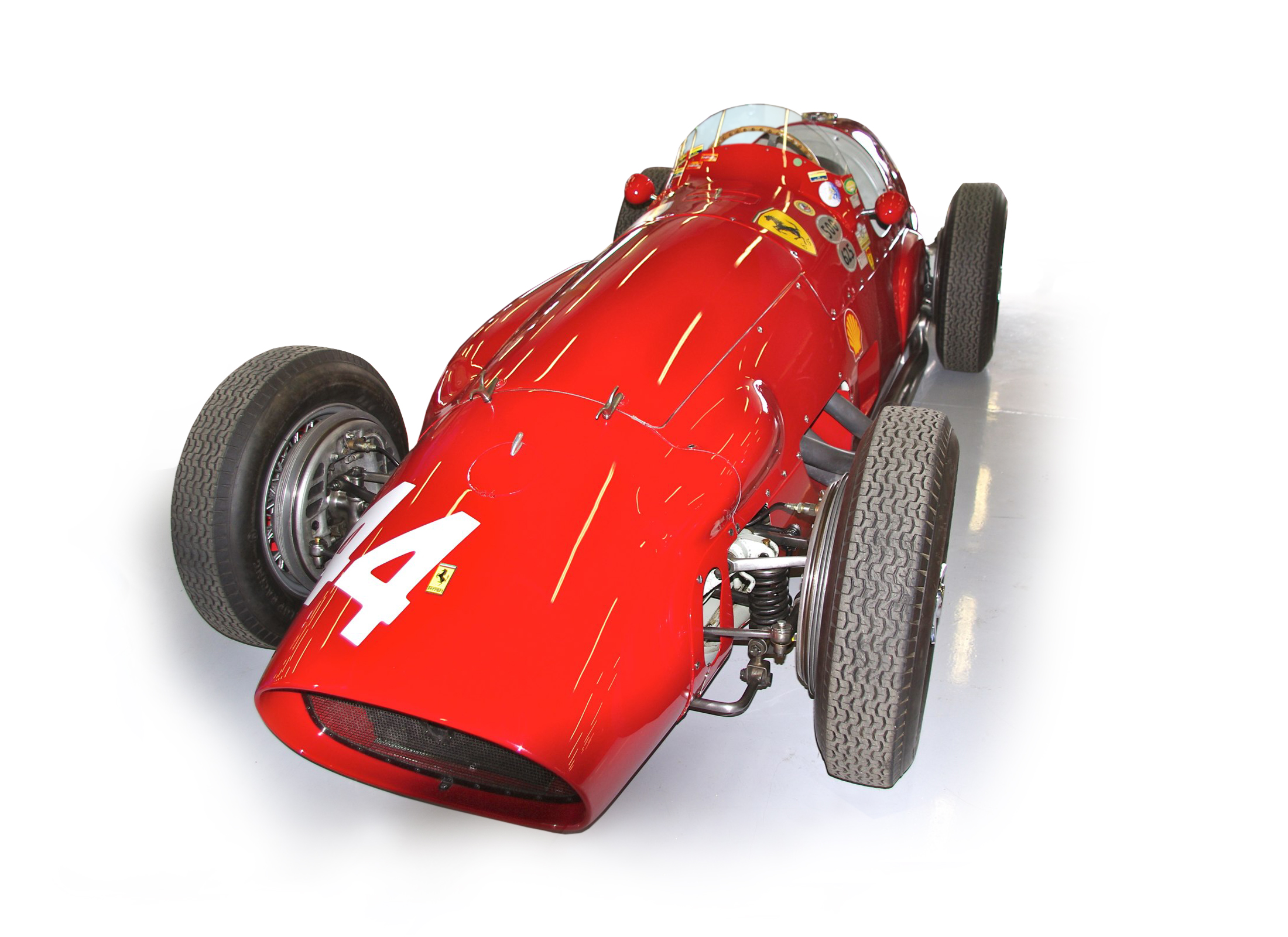
Early F1 cars were simpler with no wings and front mounted engines.

The early F1 cars were simpler in design with no wings, front mounted engines, and required significant driver effort for control. In the early 1960s, lighter cars with aluminum chassis were introduced with the addition of wings towards the end of the decade. In the 1970s, understanding of aerodynamics began to impact car design significantly, with the introduction of nose boxes in the front, and air boxes behind the driver to increase air flow to the engine. The advent of ground effect cars in the 1980s, allowed a significant increase in downforce with a small drag penalty. With continuous improvement in engines and the introduction of turbochargers, the cars produced an increased amount of thrust. The maximum permitted width of the cars was 2,150 mm (85 in) with a 1,500 mm (59 in) front axle and 1,000 mm (39 in) wide rear axle, and the maximum width was reduced to 2,000 mm (79 in) in 1994.

Following the 1994 San Marino Grand Prix, a number of changes were introduced, which led to the development of modern day F1 cars. A 10 mm (0.39 in) thick wooden skid block was added on the underside of the body to enforce minimum ground clearance. In the following seasons, several modifications were introduced, the underbody plank was lengthened and a 50 mm (2.0 in) tall, 500 mm (20 in) wide block was added on top of the plank to minimize the ground effect. The height of the front wing was increased from 40 to 50 mm (1.6 to 2.0 in) and the maximum height was reduced to 200 mm (7.9 in) above the reference plane. A step wise design was introduced with reduced side pods, engine cowling, and exclusion zones were added around the wheels to prevent any bodywork in the area apart from the suspension.

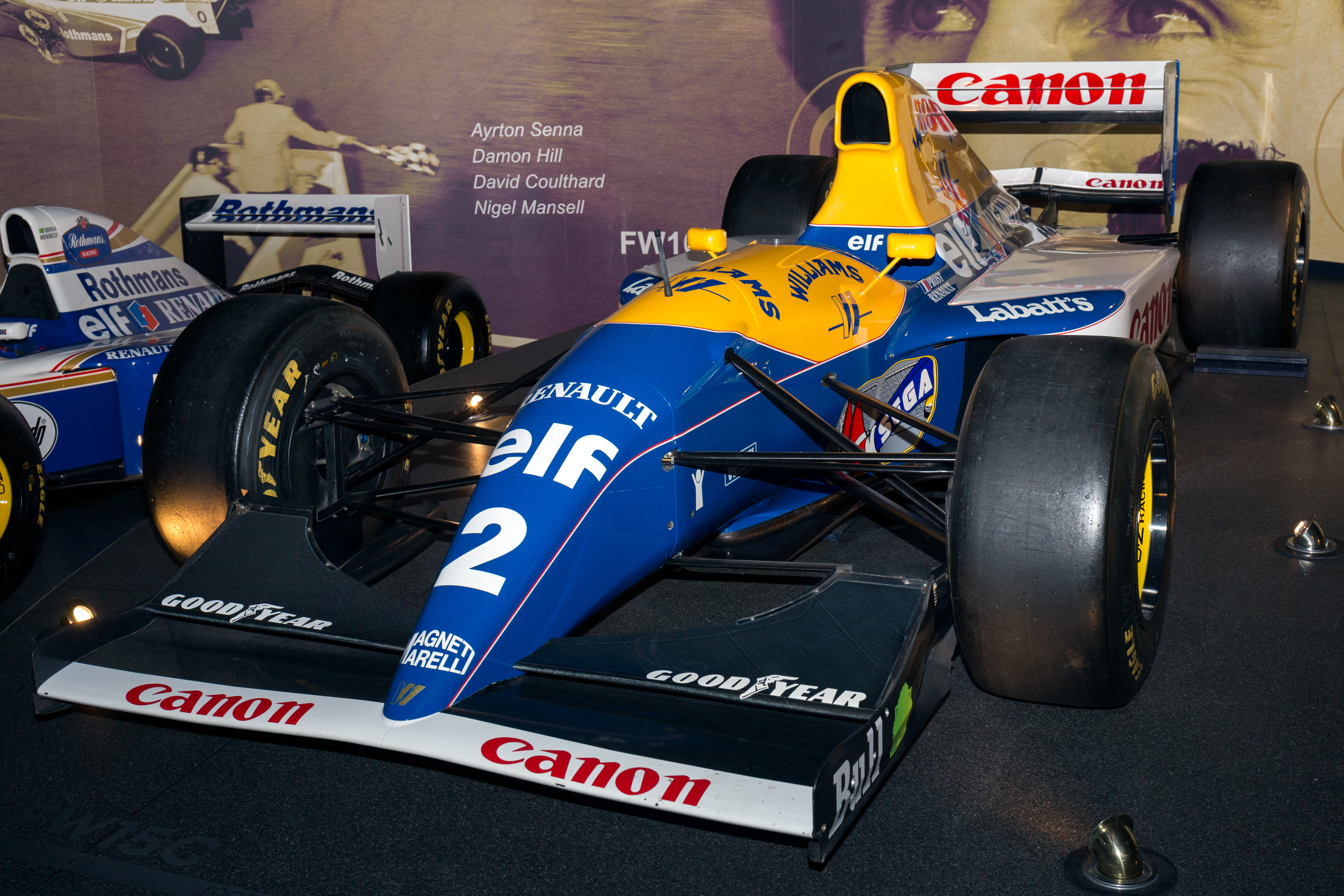
The structure of modern F1 cars developed in the 1990s.

Since the 1990s, improved electronics were incorporated to increase the efficiency, handling and reliability of the cars. Since the 2000s, with computer aided design, teams have been able to produce more efficient cars, with several changes aimed at sustainability and cost reduction, such as the cap on car parts, usage of mixed fuel, and usage of energy recovery systems. In the 2000s, the front height was increased progressively to 150 mm (5.9 in) and the maximum width and height were defined as 500 mm (20 in) and 950 mm (37 in) respectively. Fédération Internationale de l'Automobile (FIA) enacted further changes to the body structure over the subsequent years to improve racing such as changes to the structure and height of the front wing, and changes to the floor design. The governing body outlawed several structures introduced by the teams, including double diffusers, modified exhaust ducts, and extra aerodynamic elements such as sharklets, cooling slots, winglets and dive planes. Modifiable front wings were also trialled in 2009 and the drag reduction system (DRS) was introduced in 2011. The latest rules in the late 2010s introduced simpler front wings, which reduced the intake of dirty air from the cars in front, and enabled closer racing. The underside of the vehicle was required to be flat between the axles with the wear of skid block limited to a maximum of 1 mm (0.039 in) during the race. The latest regulations which came into effect in 2022 with the intention of enabling closer racing, simplified the aerodynamic components, which reduced vortices, and created more ground effect.

== Design ==
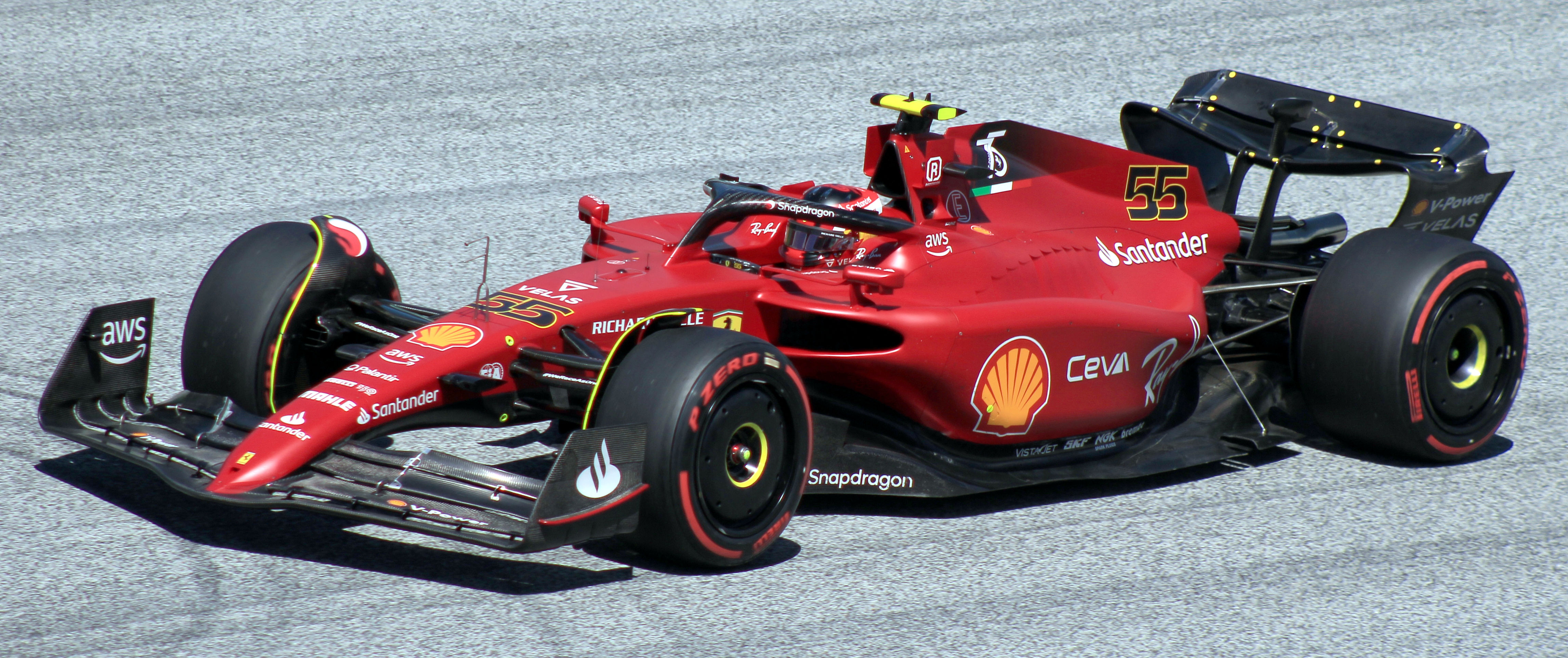
Modern F1 cars feature elaborate aerodynamic elements.

The modern Formula One car is a single-seat, open-cockpit, open-wheel racing car with substantial front and rear wings, large wheels, and a turbocharged engine positioned behind the driver. The monocoque is constructed of reinforced carbon fiber, lined with kevlar and fire resistant materials to protect the driver from high impact crashes and fires. The driver cockpit consists of single seat with a detachable steering wheel in the front. A halo safety device mounted on top of the open cockpit was introduced in 2018. Two front and rear wheels are bolted to the suspension and the engine is mounted behind the driver. The front and rear wings are aerodynamic surfaces fitted on the extremes. The minimum weight permissible is 798 kg (1,759 lb) including the driver, while fitted with dry-weather tyres and no fuel. The cars are limited to dimensions of 5.63 m (18.5 ft) in length, 2 m (6 ft 7 in) in width, and 0.9 m (2 ft 11 in) in height.

=== Livery ===
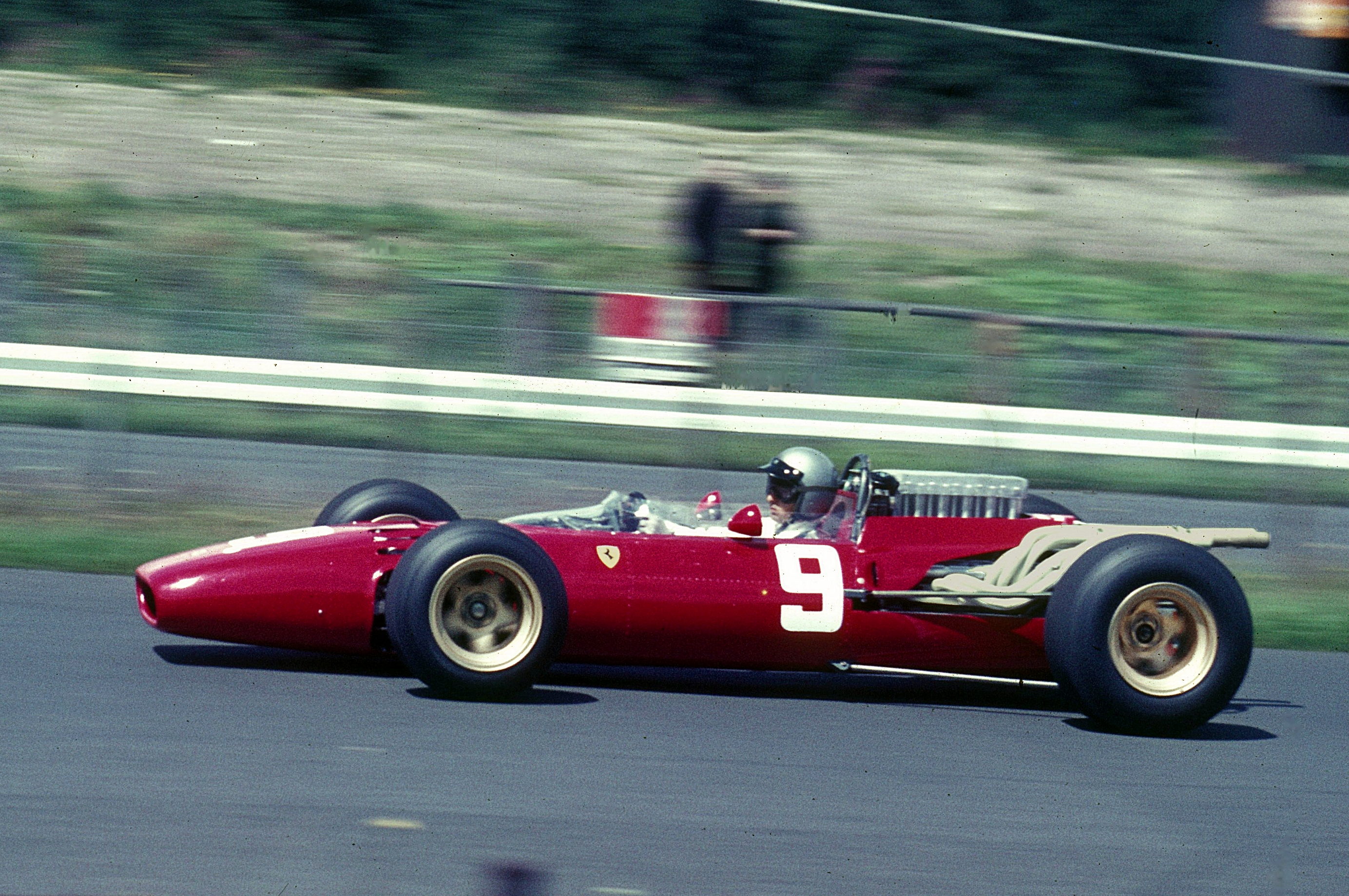
The livery of early Formula One cars only consisted of the colour and driver number.

Prior to 1968, Formula One cars were coloured after the nationality of a constructor, and as such would sport a standardised colour (e.g. British racing green, rosso corsa, Silver Arrows). The FIA allowed teams to have unrestricted sponsorship in 1968. The privateer Team Gunston was the first constructor to enter a car with sponsors, doing so at the 1968 South African Grand Prix. Teams began to rely on sponsors for funding as running costs increased, and as such their liveries began to feature major implementations of their sponsors. Following this uptick in sponsorships, it was very rare to see a team run with minimal sponsorships; one such example was McLaren in 2014. Following the debut of McLaren's special Monaco Grand Prix livery in 2021, teams began to design one-off liveries that would be run for one or more events, commonly celebrating an anniversary, sponsorship, or driver.

== Components ==
=== Engine and fuel ===
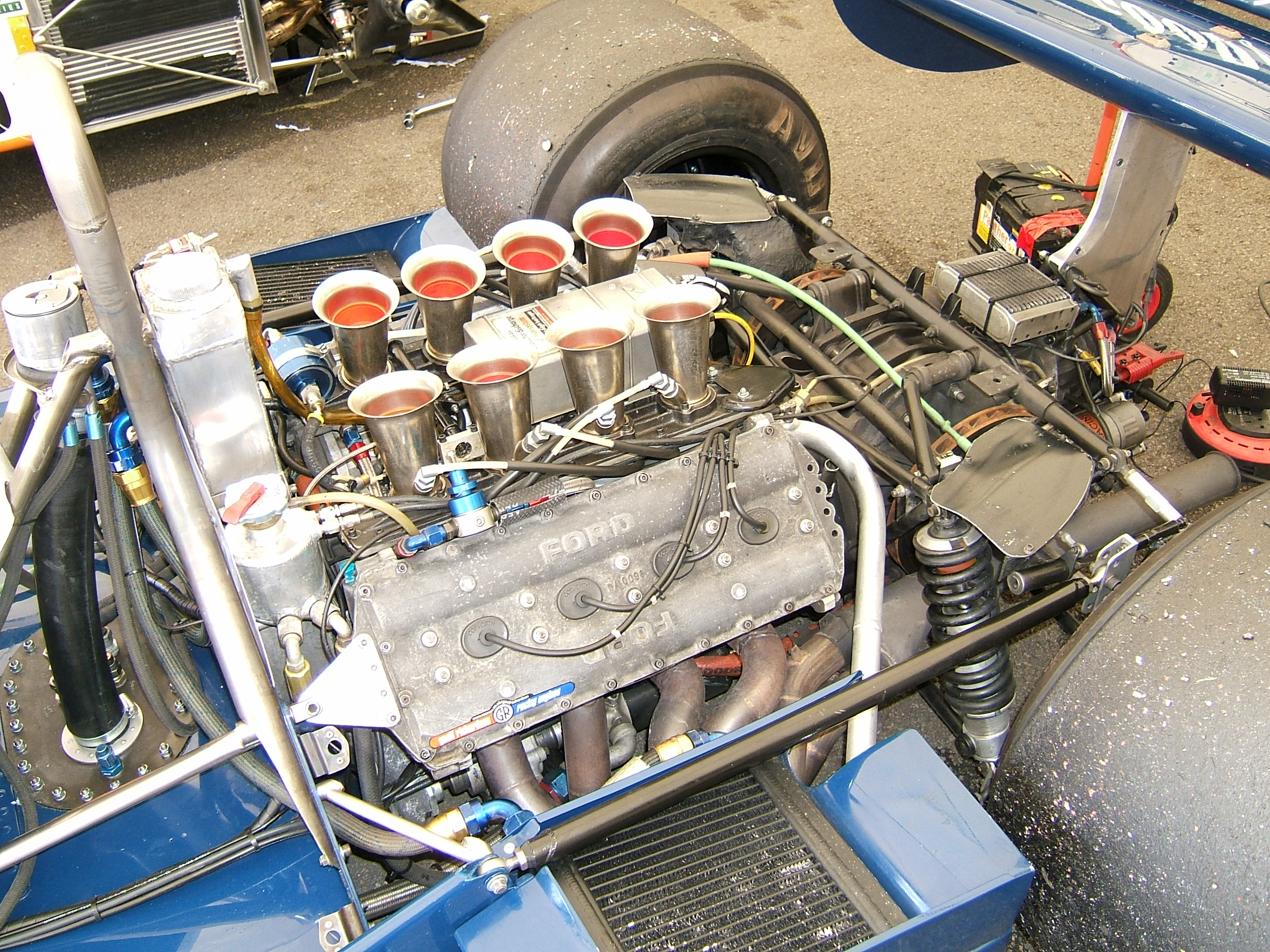
A Cosworth DFV V8 engine fitted to a Tyrrell, used from the late 1960s to early 1980s.

Since its inception, Formula One has used a number of different engine regulations. During the early years, a front-engine, four-wheel-drive layout was used with a 4.5 L naturally aspirated or a 1.5 L supercharged engine capable of an output power of up to 317 kW (425 hp). Progressively the engine capacity and power were reduced, and was limited to 0.75 L with compressor or 2.5 L without one during the late 1950s. In 1961, the engine was positioned behind the driver and the capacity was regulated to 1300–1500 cc with a power output of 150–225 hp without supercharging. In 1966, FIA increased engine capacity and allowed up to 3.0 L atmospheric with a power range of 290–370 kW (390–500 hp) or 1.5 L supercharged with a power range of 370–670 kW (500–900 hp). While the basic structure and configuration of a Formula One remained same since the late 1960s, the power output of the engines increased progressively to 1,000 kW (1,400 hp) at 12000 rpm in 1986. In 1987-88, turbocharged eight-cylinder engines were introduced alongside atmospheric engines with fuel caps for races introduced for turbocharged engines. Turbochargers were banned from 1989 with 3.0 L engines becoming the norm in the 1990s and led to the introduction of V10 and V12 engines.

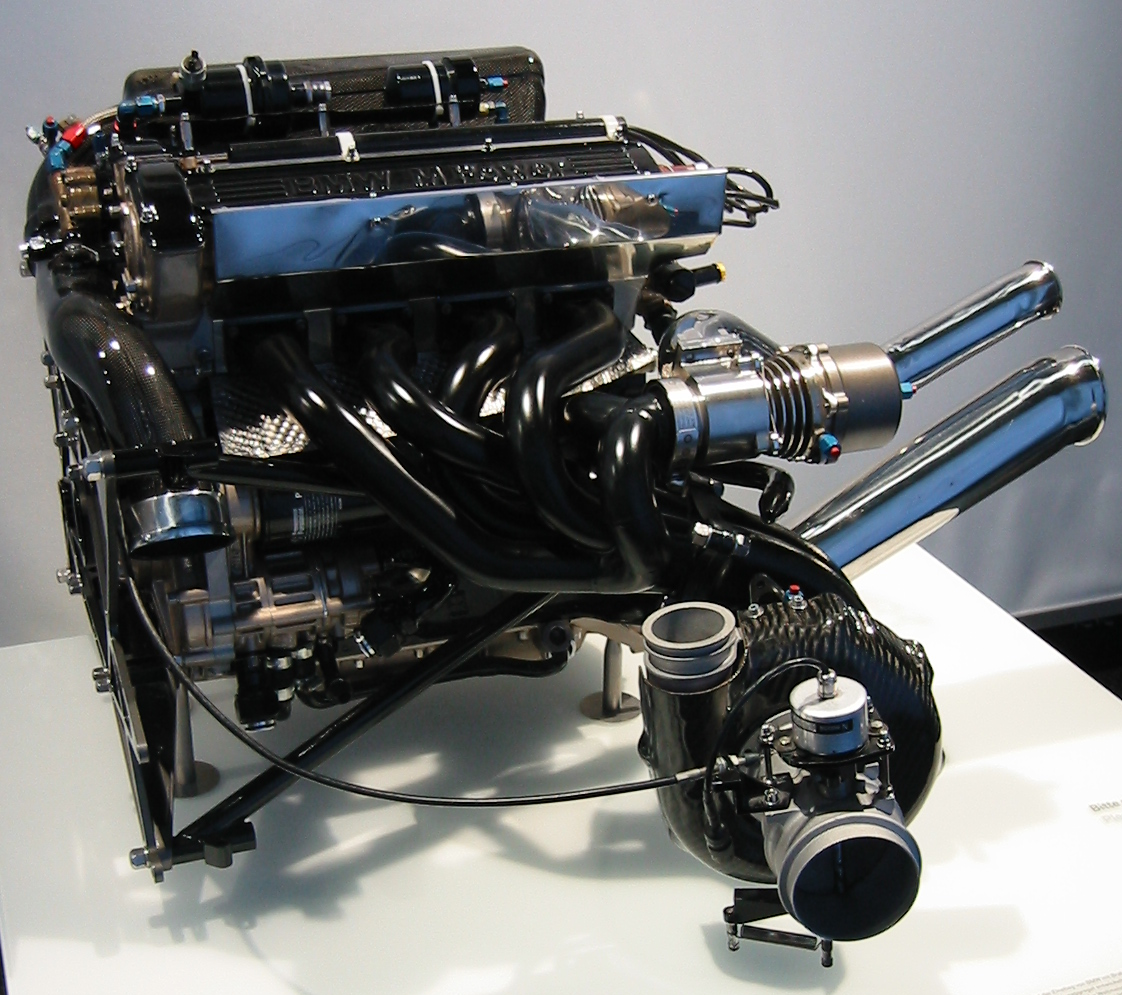
A four-cylinder 1.5 L turbo BMW engine from the 1980s.

The teams started constructing engine components using advanced metal alloys such as titanium and beryllium, which reduced weight and improved the efficiency and durability. FIA outlawed the use of these towards the late 1990s with only iron and aluminum permitted. The introduction of pneumatic valve springs in the same period allowed the engines to reach up to 20,000 rpm. For a decade, the F1 cars had run with 3.0 L naturally aspirated V10 engines producing 730–750 kW (980–1,000 hp) of power with top speeds of up to 375 km/h (233 mph). Though the FIA continually enforced material and design restrictions to limit power, the V10s in the 2005 season were reported to develop 730 kW (980 hp), power levels not seen since the ban on turbocharged engines in 1989. Before the 2006 season, FIA introduced a new engine formula, which mandated cars to be powered by 2.4 liter naturally aspirated V8 engine configuration, with no more than four valves per cylinder and banned variable intake trumpets. For the 2009 season, the engines were limited to 18,000 rpm to improve engine reliability and cut costs. In 2012, the engines consumed around 450 L (16 cu ft) of air per second with a race fuel consumption rate of 75 L/100 km (3.8 mpg_{‑imp}; 3.1 mpg_{‑US}).

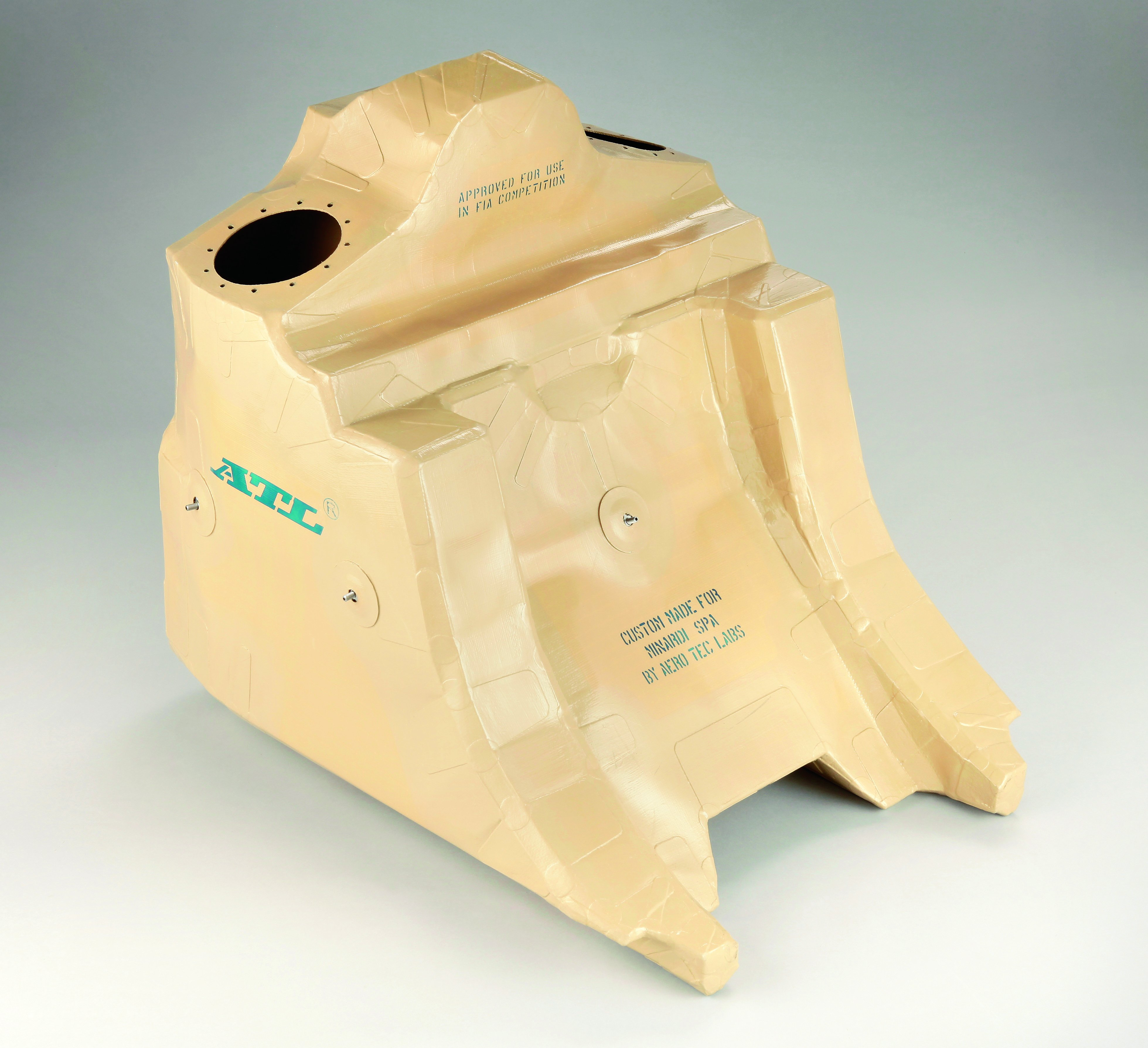
Crash resistant fuel bladders, reinforced with kevlar are used.

For the 2014 season, FIA introduced 1.6 L six-cylinder turbocharged engines with a kinetic energy recovery system (KERS) to increase fuel-efficiency. For 2022, a modified V6 configuration was introduced with a more powerful KERS. Over the years, FIA has been gradually reducing the overall allocation of engines per season and with the increasing number of races, each engine is expected to last for at least 2,000 km (1,200 mi). FIA had also introduced standardization of certain engine parts and cap on engine components to reduce costs with grid penalties applied for drivers who exceed the allocation. As per the current regulations, a maximum of five power units are allowed per season. The engine is located between the driver and the rear axle and is bolted to the cockpit at the front end, and transmission and rear suspension at the back end.

The fuel used in F1 cars is a mixture of unleaded petrol and ethanol with a tightly controlled mixture ratio. As a part of the regulation change in 2022, the ethanol content was increased from 5.75% to 10%. Formula One switched to fully sustainable fuels for the 2026 season, following a similar change in the Formula 2 feeder series. Cars were allowed to be refuelled during the race till 2010, after which refuelling was banned. The cars are stipulated to carry a maximum fuel of 110 kg per race, with at least 1 kg to be made available to the FIA for post race inspection. Any abnormalities in the fuel or failure to provide the sample results in disqualification from the race. The fuel bladder is made of high-quality rubber lined with kevlar for protection against crashes and is located in front of the engine, behind the cockpit.

=== Steering and transmission ===
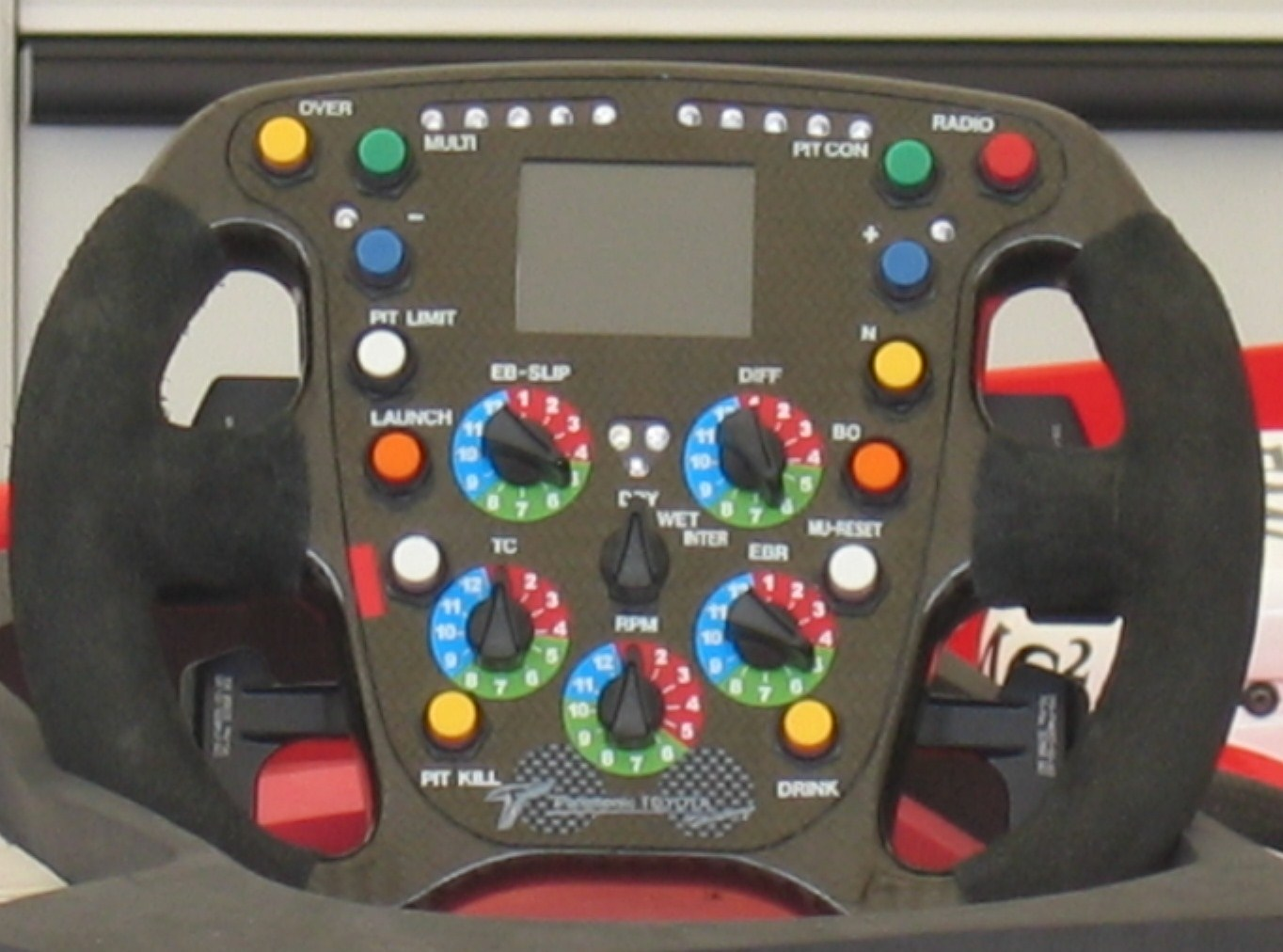
A typical electronic steering wheel used in a F1 car.

A typical steering wheel used in a F1 car is an electronic control with an array of knobs, buttons and levers. It is made of carbon fibre with titanium, silicon, fibreglass, and copper parts. It has two driver handles on the sides with a mandated Motion Applied LCD screen in the center which includes LED gear shift lights at the top and gear shift paddles in the back. The steering wheel is used to control various functions of the car such as gears, engine revolutions, fuel–air mix, brake balance, differential mapping, among others. The display displays various data points including engine parameters, gears, temperature and time. The steering wheel is also used to access the radio and control the drinking mechanism. It weighs about 1.3 kg (2.9 lb) and can cost about $50,000.

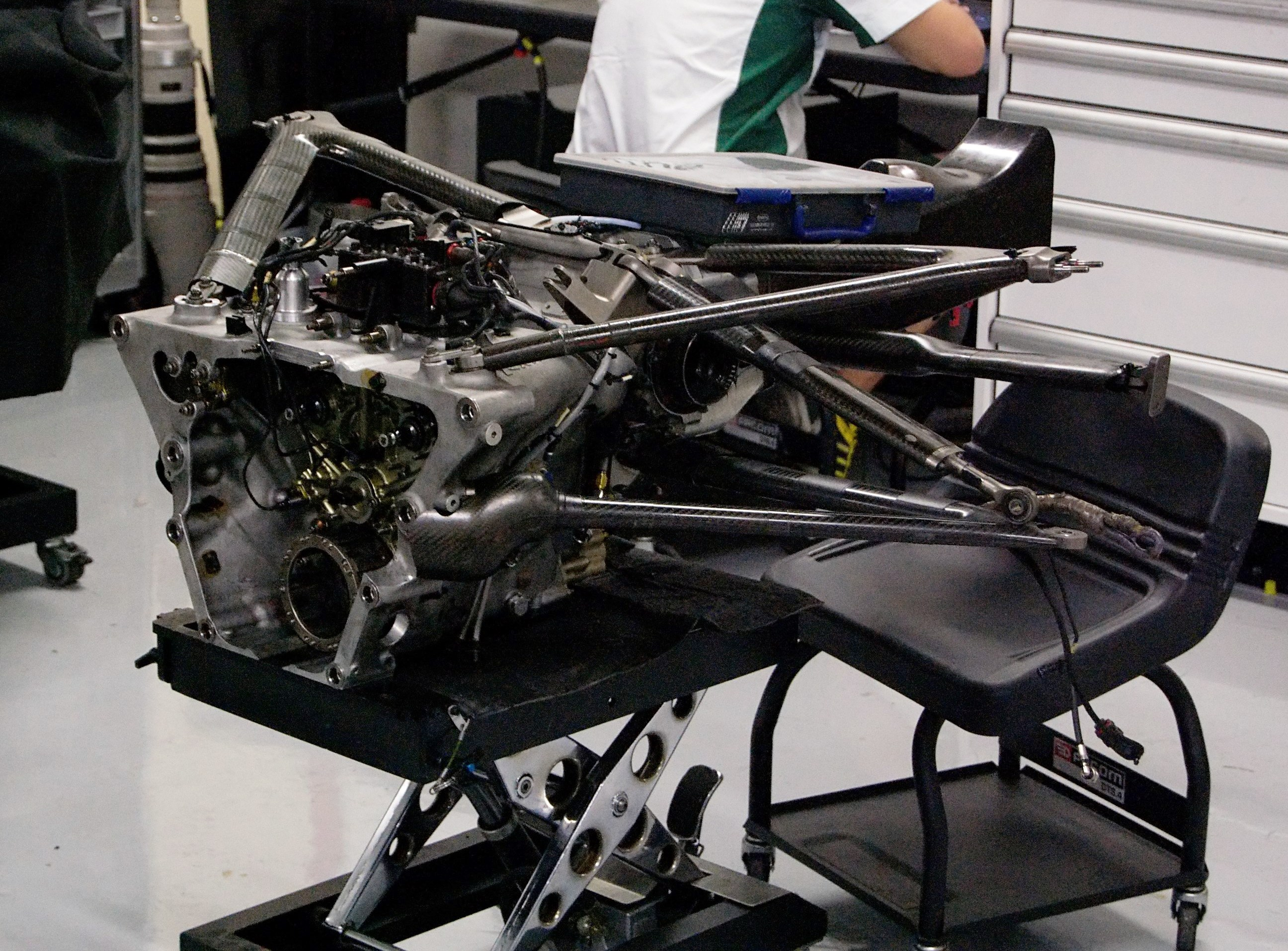
The gearbox and rear suspension from a Lotus T127 in 2010 season.

While conventional manual gearboxes were used earlier, modern Formula One cars use semi-automatic sequential gearboxes with a rear-wheel-drive. It has eight forward gears and a reverse gear operated with paddle-shifters. The gearbox is constructed of carbon reinforced titanium, and is bolted onto the back of the engine. Fully-automatic gearboxes, and systems such as launch control and traction control were banned in the 2000s to keep driver skill and involvement important in controlling the car, and reduce costs. When the driver initiates gear shifts using paddles mounted on the back of the steering wheel, a system of solenoids, hydraulic actuators, and sensors perform the actual shift, and electronic throttle control controlled by the ECU. Clutch control is also performed in the same manner except when launching from neutral into first gear, where the driver operates the clutch manually using a lever on the back of the steering wheel. The clutch is a multi-plate carbon design with a diameter of less than 100 mm (3.9 in), and weight of less than 1 kg (2.2 lb), capable of handling up to 540 kW (720 hp). The cars use seamless shift transmissions, which allow almost instantaneous changing of gears with minimum loss of drive and a shift times of 2–3 ms. As a measure to reduce costs, gearbox ratios are fixed for a season.

=== Wheels and tyres ===
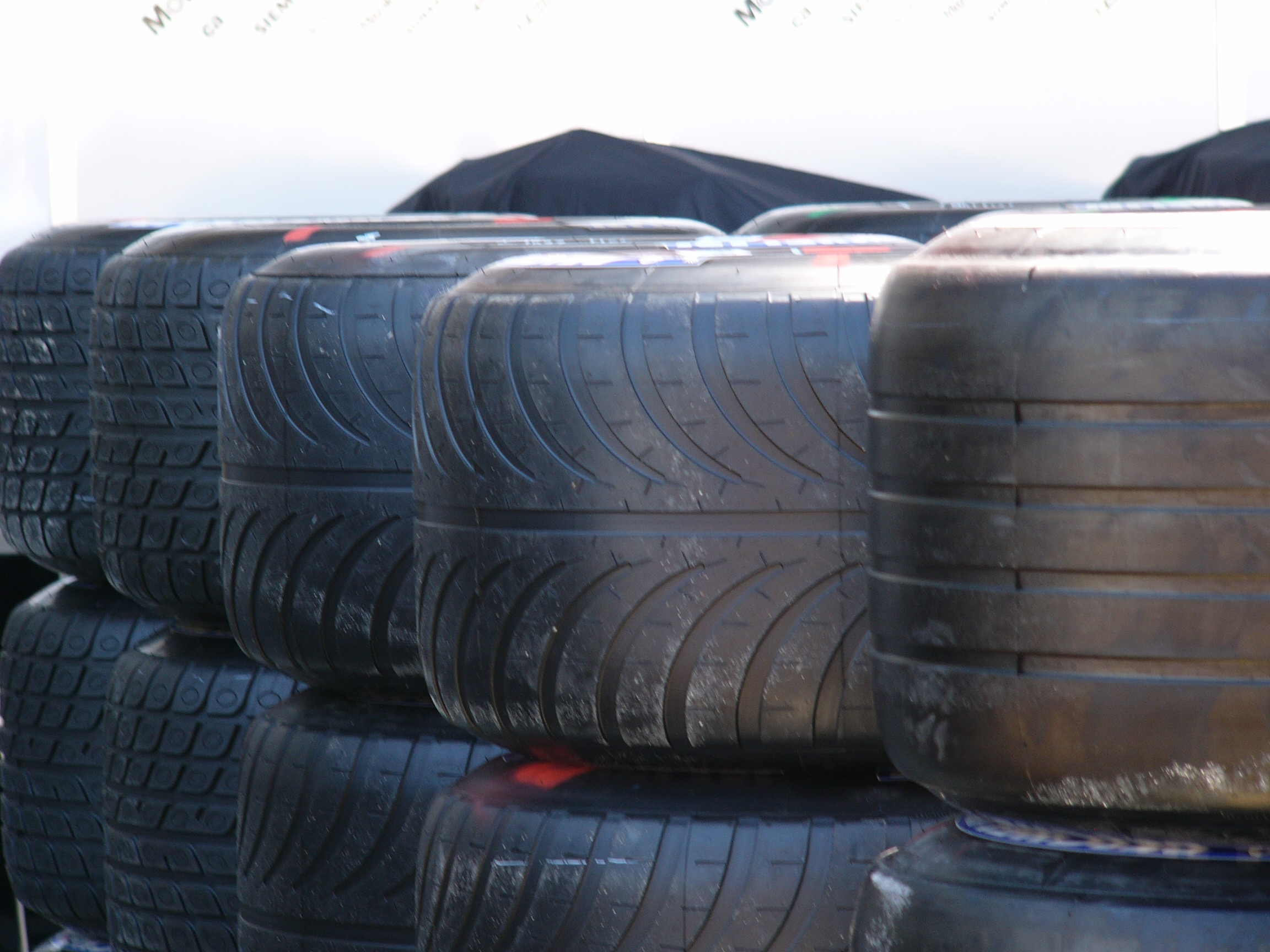
Grooved tyres were used between 1999 and 2008.

During the 1950s and 1960s, Formula One tyres were treaded rubber tyres similar to the automobile tyres but larger. In the late 1950s, cotton fabric was replaced with nylon fabric, which reduced weight and increased durability. In the 1960s, the tyres became wider and synthetic rubber was used along with nylon. Slick tyres were introduced for the first time during the 1971 season. In the 1975 season, the cars used 26.0"×16.2"–13" slick tyre (diameter × width) in the rear on a 13"×18" rim, and a 20.0"×9.2"–13" slick tyre in the front on a 13×10" rim. For the 1981 season, the maximum diameter of the rear tyre was limited to 26.0", and the diameter of the front tyres was increased, with the tyres measuring 25.0"×10.0"–13" in the front and 26.0"×15.0"–13" in the rear. Ahead of the 1993 season, the width of the rear was reduced from 18" to 15". In 1998, grooved tyres were introduced with three groove lines in the front tyres and four groove lines in the rear tyres. Between 1999 and 2008, regulations required the tyres to feature a minimum of four 14 mm (0.55 in) grooves in them, with the intention of slowing the cars down as the slick tyre, with no indentations, provides the most grip in dry conditions. The tyre sizes were limited to 355 mm (14.0 in) at the front and 380 mm (15 in) at the rear, and the maximum diameter was 660 mm (26 in) for dry and 670 mm (26 in) for wet tyres. Briefly in 2005, tyre changes during the race were outlawed and the tyre compounds were made harder to last the full race distance.

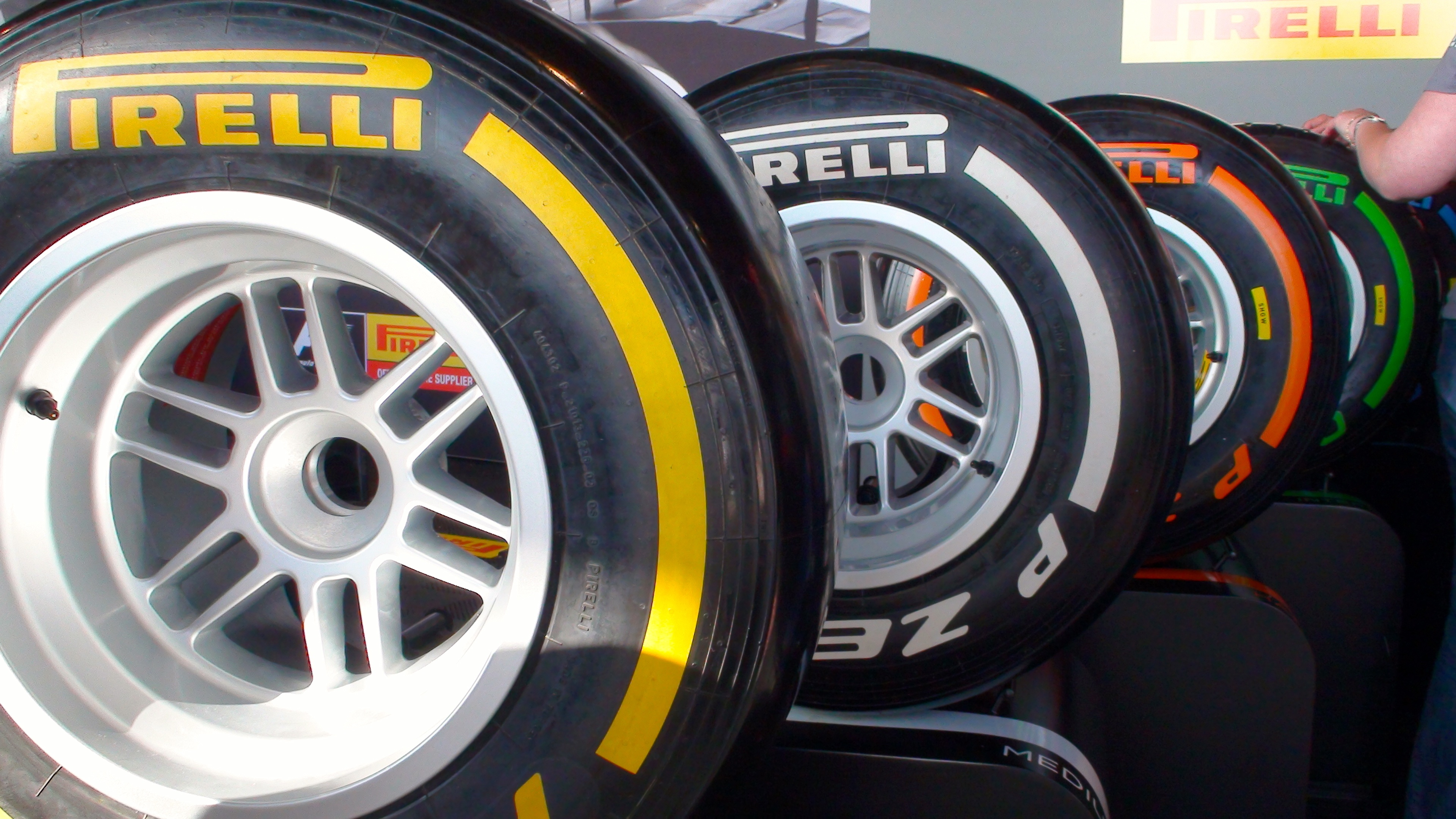
Various compounds of colour coded slick tyres are used during dry weather.

Slick tyres were reintroduced at the beginning of 2009, with the front tyres narrowed from 270 mm (11 in) to 245 mm (9.6 in), to shift the balance towards mechanical grip in an attempt to increase overtaking. Since the introduction of slick tyres in 2009, the tyre construct has remained almost the same with only variations to tyre sizes. The teams are given a fixed number of sets of three compounds of slick dry weather tyres, and additional sets of grooved intermediate and wet weather tyres for a race weekend. The tyre compounds are demarcated by a colour coding, with the teams mandated to use at least two dry compounds during a dry race. Briefly in 2016, teams were given an option to choose tyre compounds. For the 2017 F1 season, significantly wider Pirelli tyres were introduced at both the front and rear axles, while the overall diameter of the tyres was increased from 660 to 670 mm (26 to 26 in). Front tyre size increased to 305/670-R13 while rear-tyre size increased to 405/670-R13. For the 2022 F1 season, the wheel rim diameter size was increased from 13 to 18 in (330 to 460 mm), and the diameter was increased from 670 to 720 mm (26 to 28 in).

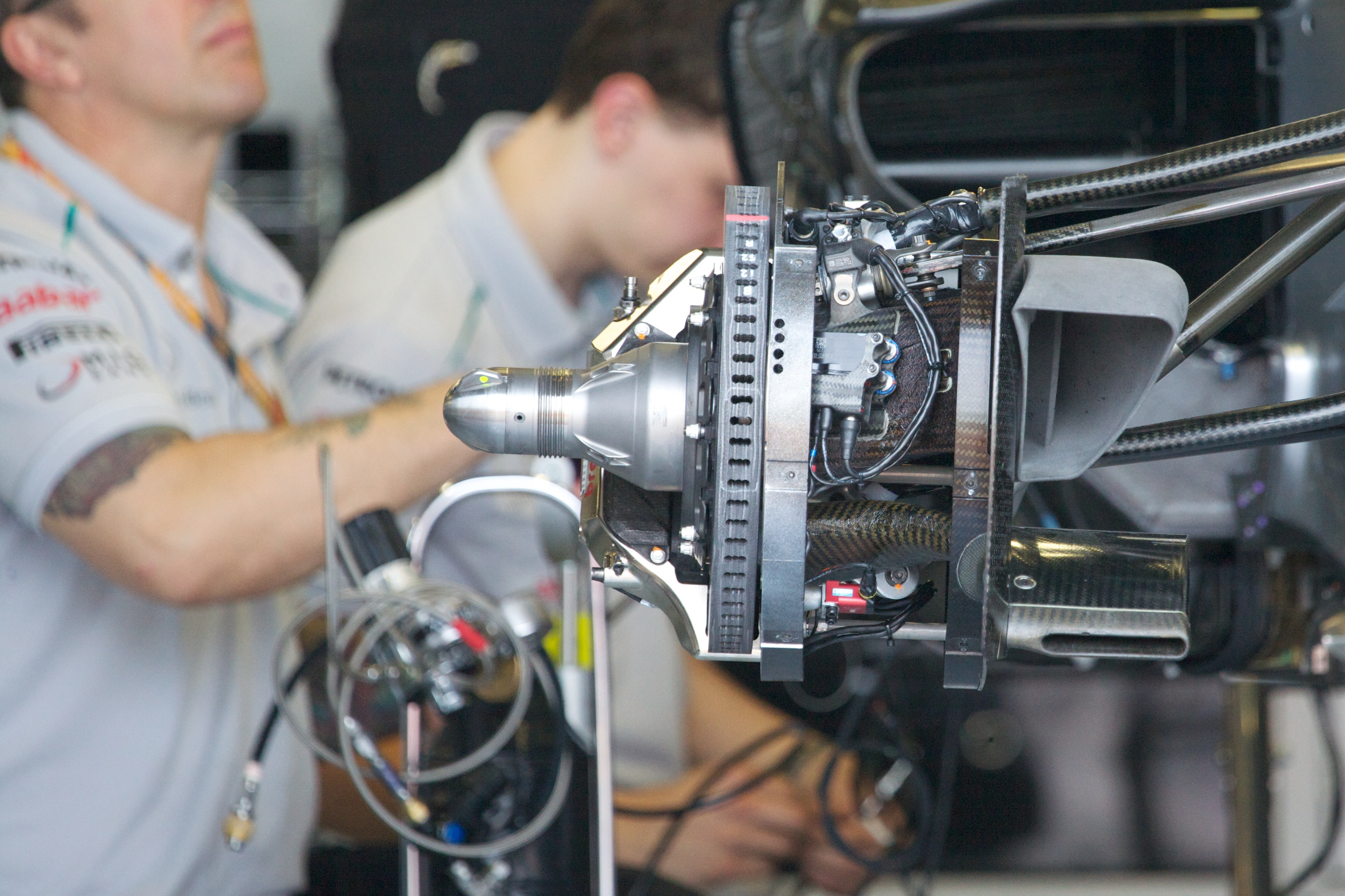
A brake disc on a F1 car.

Disc brakes are used for braking, similar to road cars. The brakes consist of a rotor disc and a caliper, with six piston clamp pads inside each caliper. The driver applies pressure on the brake pedal, which uses hydraulic pressure to drive the clamps and the friction on the disc slows the car. The front brakes are simpler with direct pressure applied onto the brake discs to slow down. In the rear, braking is achieved by the combination of three forces, friction on the brakes, resistance from the engine, and the energy recovery system. The driver can control the effect of these and brake distribution using the steering wheel. An average F1 car can decelerate from 100 to 0 km/h (62 to 0 mph) in less than 15 m (49 ft) and hence the brakes are subjected to high temperatures of up to 1,000 °C (1,830 °F) and severe g forces. To withstand high temperatures, brakes are made of carbon composites. The brakes are cooled by air passing through numerous small holes in the brake ducts.

=== Wings ===
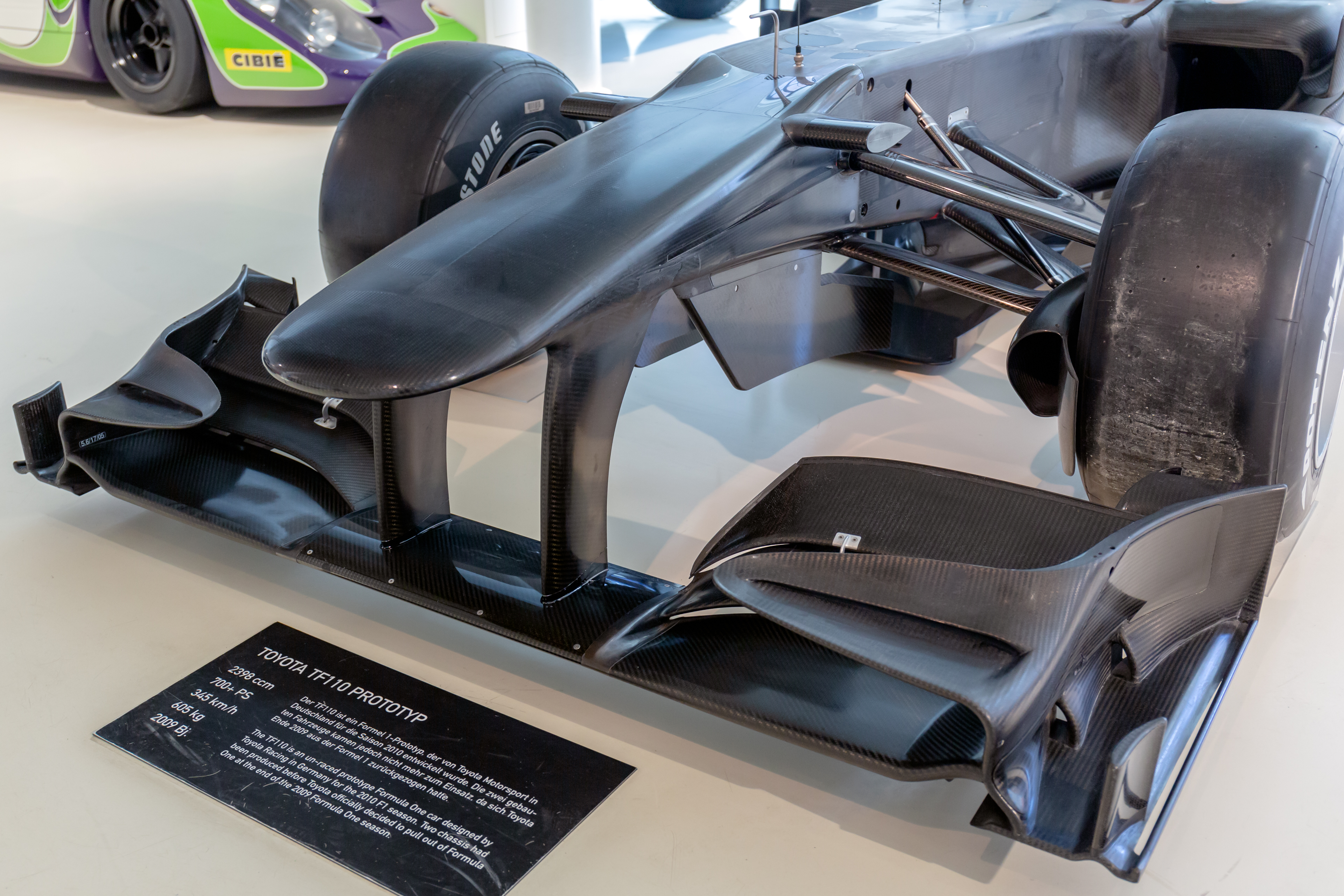
A typical front wing of a F1 car in 2009

Early designs linked wings directly to the suspension, but several accidents led to rules stating that wings must be fixed rigidly to the chassis. The wings are aerofoils on the front and rear of the car, and are made of carbon fibre composites for higher strength and reduced weight. The front wing is a forked structure with a maximum width of 1,800 mm (71 in) and must not extend more than 200 mm (7.9 in) beyond the center line. It can have a maximum of four wing elements and should not bend more than 5 mm (0.20 in). It is made of aluminium alloy, carbon fibre and fibre glass, and can cost up to $300,000. The rear wing consists of a main plane which spans the width of the car with smaller horizontal flaps that angle downwards. There are short upright tabs on the trailing edge of the flaps with vertical end plates at the wing tips. The drag reduction system (DRS) was a flap adjustment mechanism in the rear wings that was operated hydraulically following steering inputs from the driver.

=== Energy recovery system ===
Operation of KERS in an F1 car.

The kinetic energy recovery systems (KERS) recovers the kinetic energy created by the car's braking process. It stores that energy and converts it into power that can be used to boost acceleration. There are principally two types of systems: electrical and mechanical flywheel. Electrical systems use a motor-generator incorporated in the car's transmission which converts mechanical energy into electrical energy and vice versa. Once the energy has been harnessed, it is stored in a battery and released at will. Mechanical systems capture braking energy and use it to turn a small flywheel which can spin at high speeds. When extra power is required, the flywheel is connected to the car's rear wheels. KERS typically adds 120 hp (89 kW) additional power boost for a specific time.

=== Other elements ===
A nose box or nose cone is a structure to which the front wing is attached. It directs the airflow towards the floor of the car, and acts as a shock absorber in case of accidents. It is made of high strength composite materials and is subjected to various load tests by the FIA to ensure its rigidity. The halo is a safety device mounted on the cockpit, and is made of series of curved metal bars intended to protect the driver's head during crashes. The air box is situated behind the cockpit, and serves as the receptacle of the high speed air moving over the body. It supplies the pressurized air to the engine intakes, boosting its power and absorbs the turbulence generated from the air passing over the driver's helmet. Air filters are used to filter the dirty air before being passed into the engines.

== Aerodynamics ==
Aerodynamics has become key to success in the sport, and the teams spend time and money on research and development of the same each year. The sculpted front and rear wings with the rest of the body parts such as the vanes beneath the nose, bargeboards, sidepods, underbody, and the rear diffuser, play a role in determining the aerodynamic efficiency of the car. A modern Formula One car is capable of developing up to six G of lateral cornering force and a downforce equivalent to twice its weight at 190 km/h (120 mph). The car is designed to create the maximum amount of downforce for the minimal amount of drag with the configuration often modified to the requirements of a particular track. The interaction of various components amplifies the total downforce more than the sum of their standalone contributions.

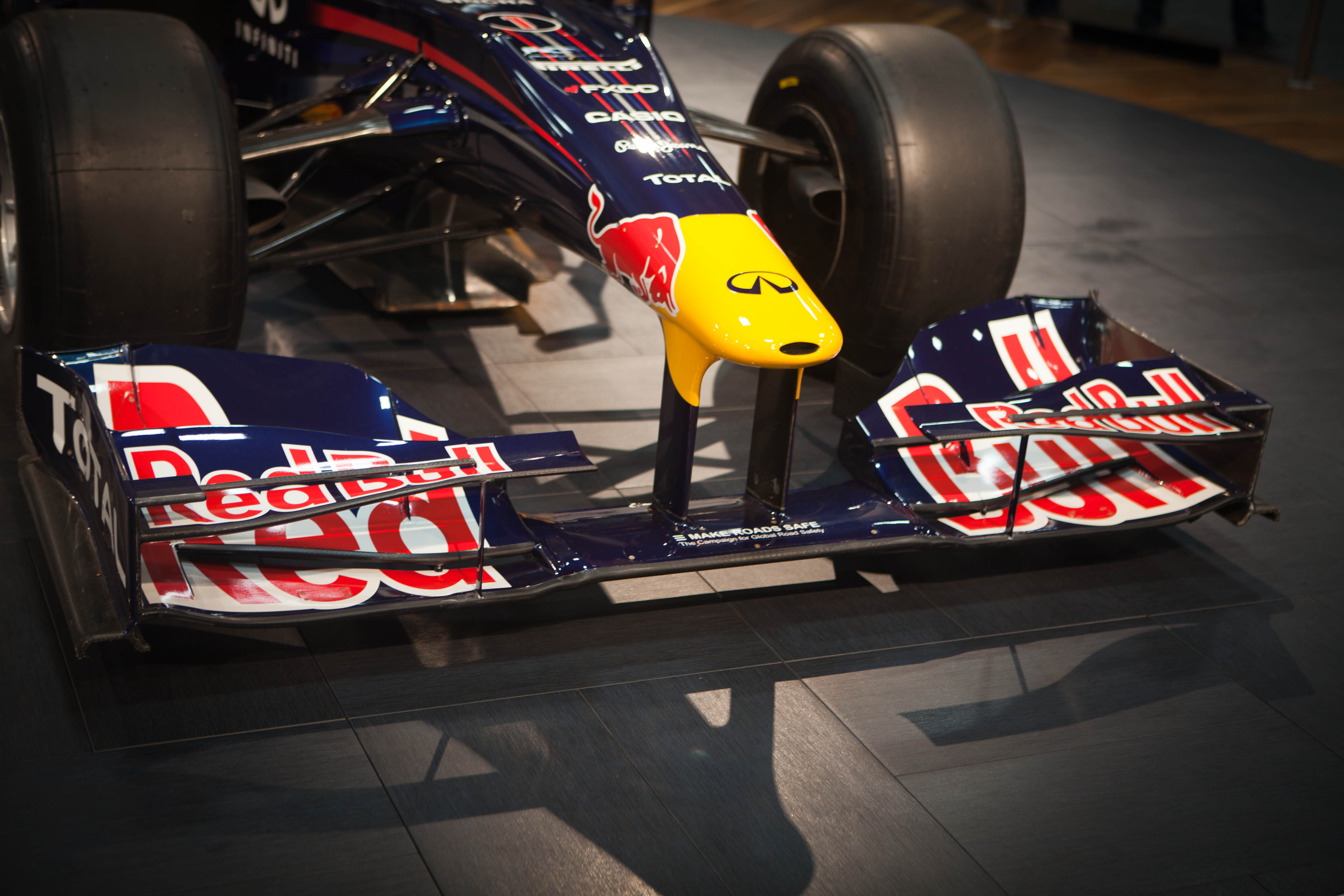
Front of a F1 car showing the front wing arrangement.

The wings operate similarly to inverted airplane wings, to produce a negative lift or downward force. The profile of the front wing, along with the angle of attack against the incoming air, define the downforce generated. Other smaller elements such as flaps, and gaps between the elements help with controlling the airflow. A steeper angle of attack increases the downforce while creating increased drag. The front wing also directs the airflow to the rest of the car with the air flowing into the sidepod intakes used for the temperature regulation of the engine. The air flowing underneath the floor helps to seal the gap with the ground, contributing to the ground effect. A low-pressure area is created which effectively sucks the car towards the ground, increasing the down force and grip of the car. The designers aspire for a smoother airflow over the body of the car, while minimizing the wakes formed by the rotating wheels.Vortices created between the front wing and the nose box help to reduce the turbulence. Minor changes to the front wing can have drastic effects on the aerodynamics of the car.

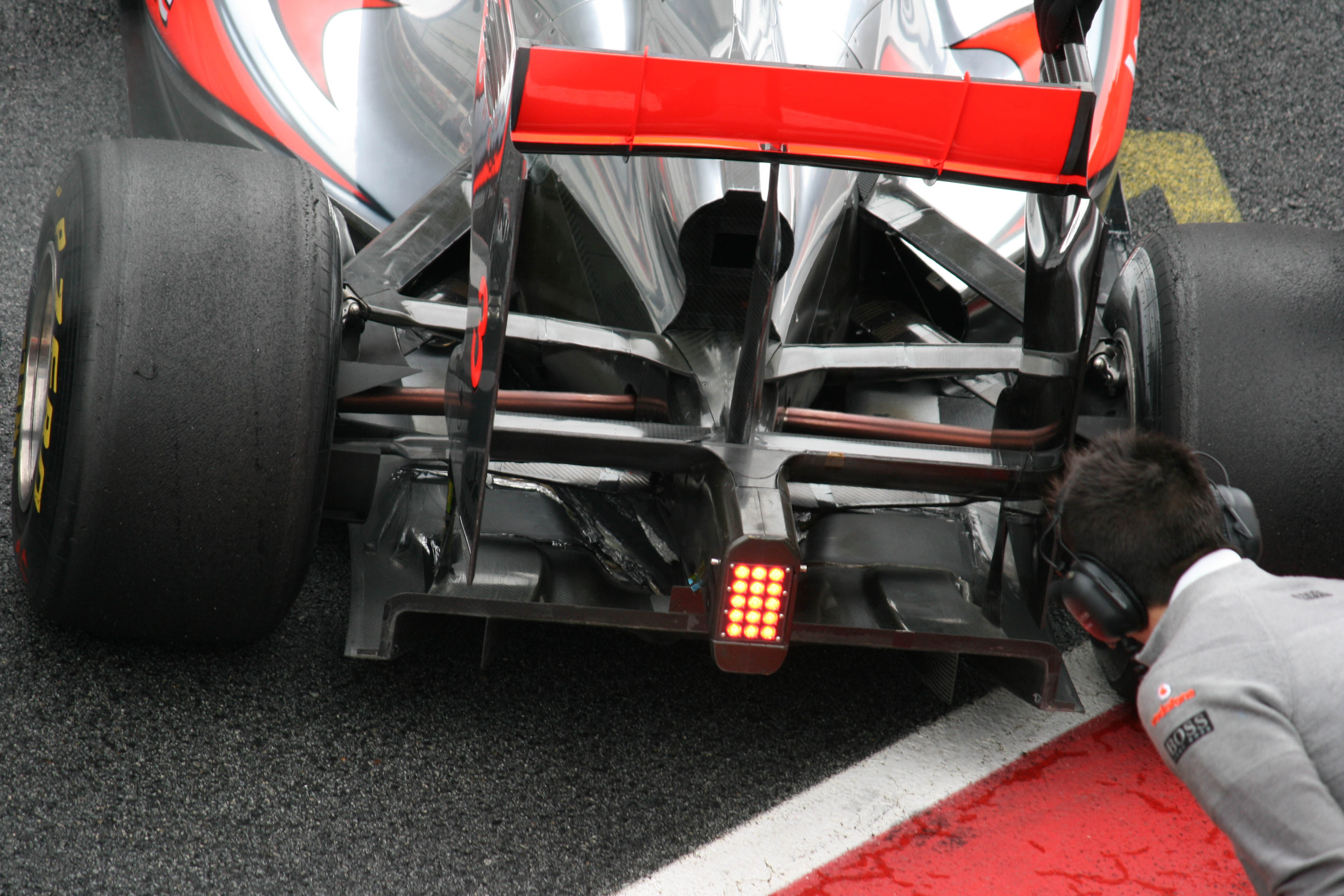
Rear of an F1 car, showing the rear wing and diffuser configuration.

The rear wings serve similarly to the front wings as inverted airfoils, and deflect the air downwards, causing a down force. The angle of the main plane and flaps determine the direction of the airflow, with other elements used to further fine tune the same. Higher angles increase downforce while also contributing to a higher turbulence and decreased stability of the rear wing. The rear wings are designed so as to withstand high loads without decreasing the downforce. The other structural elements of the car such as the side pods, and body work determine the amount of air flowing through the rear wings. The rear wing generates vortexes which keep the airflow attached to the car longer, delaying the aerodynamic stall. The rear wing can be modified to various configurations depending on the race track and the circumstances. The DRS opens a slot in the rear wing at the behest of the driver. It reduces drag and increases power, and hence speed, and is allowed to be operated in specific instances. The diffuser located at the rear is used to combine the pressurized airflow from the underside of the car to create more downforce.

== Performance ==
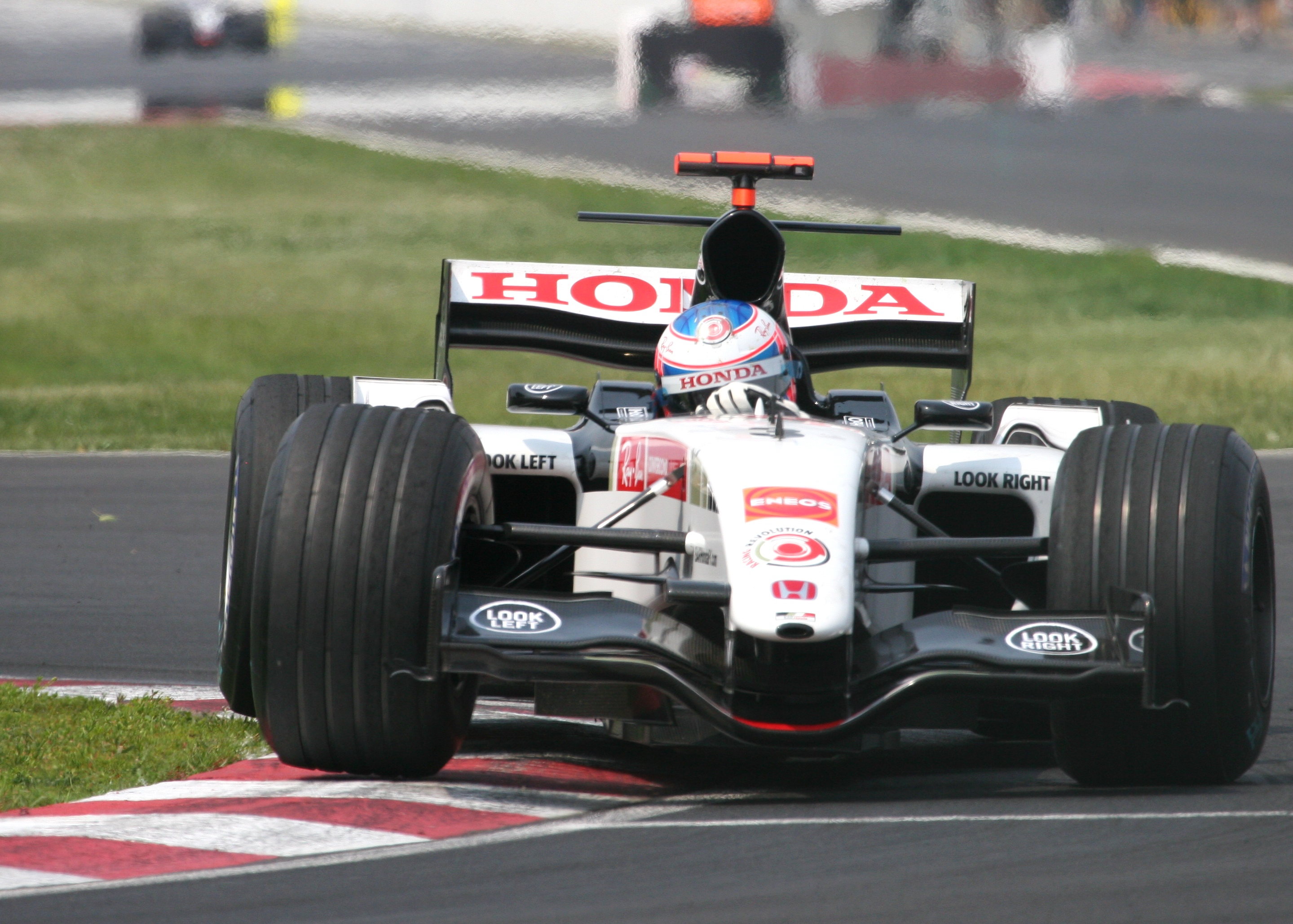
The BAR-Honda 007 set an unofficial speed record of 413 km/h (257 mph) at Bonneville Speedway.

The 1.6 L V6 hybrid engine on a modern F1 car is capable of outputting 710 kW (950 bhp) at 15,000 rpm when combined with the hybrid power system. This enables a modern F1 car to accelerate from 0 to 60 mph (0 to 97 km/h) in 1.8 seconds, and from 0 to 100 mph (0 to 161 km/h) in 2.6 seconds. It has a power-to-weight ratio of 1,297 hp/t, which would theoretically allow the car to reach 100 km/h (62 mph) in less than a second. However, due to traction loss, it accelerates slower and when the traction loss is minimal at higher speeds, the car accelerates at a very high rate. A F1 car is also capable of rapid deceleration and cornering at high speeds. Due to rapid acceleration and deceleration, the drivers may experience high levels of g force. The drivers experience 3–4 g during acceleration, and 5–6 g when braking from high speeds. During cornering at high speeds, drivers experience lateral forces between 4–6.5 g.

A modern F1 car can achieve top speeds of nearly 375 km/h (233 mph), and operate on average speeds of about 200 km/h (120 mph) during a race. Top speeds in practice are achieved in straight parts of a track, and is determined by the aerodynamic configuration of the car in balancing between high straight-line speed (low aerodynamic drag) and high cornering speed (high downforce) to achieve the fastest lap time. In 2005, McLaren recorded a record top speed of 372.6 km/h (231.5 mph) during testing, which was officially recognised by the FIA as the fastest speed ever achieved by an F1 car. At the 2016 Mexican Grand Prix, the Williams of Valtteri Bottas reached a top speed of 372.54 km/h (231.49 mph) in racing conditions. Away from the track, the BAR Honda team used a modified BAR 007 car to set an unofficial speed record of 413 km/h (257 mph) on a one way straight-line run on 6 November 2005 at Bonneville Speedway, with the car later setting an FIA ratified record of 400 km/h (250 mph) on 21 July 2006, again in Bonneville.
