= Flexible tank =

Storage container

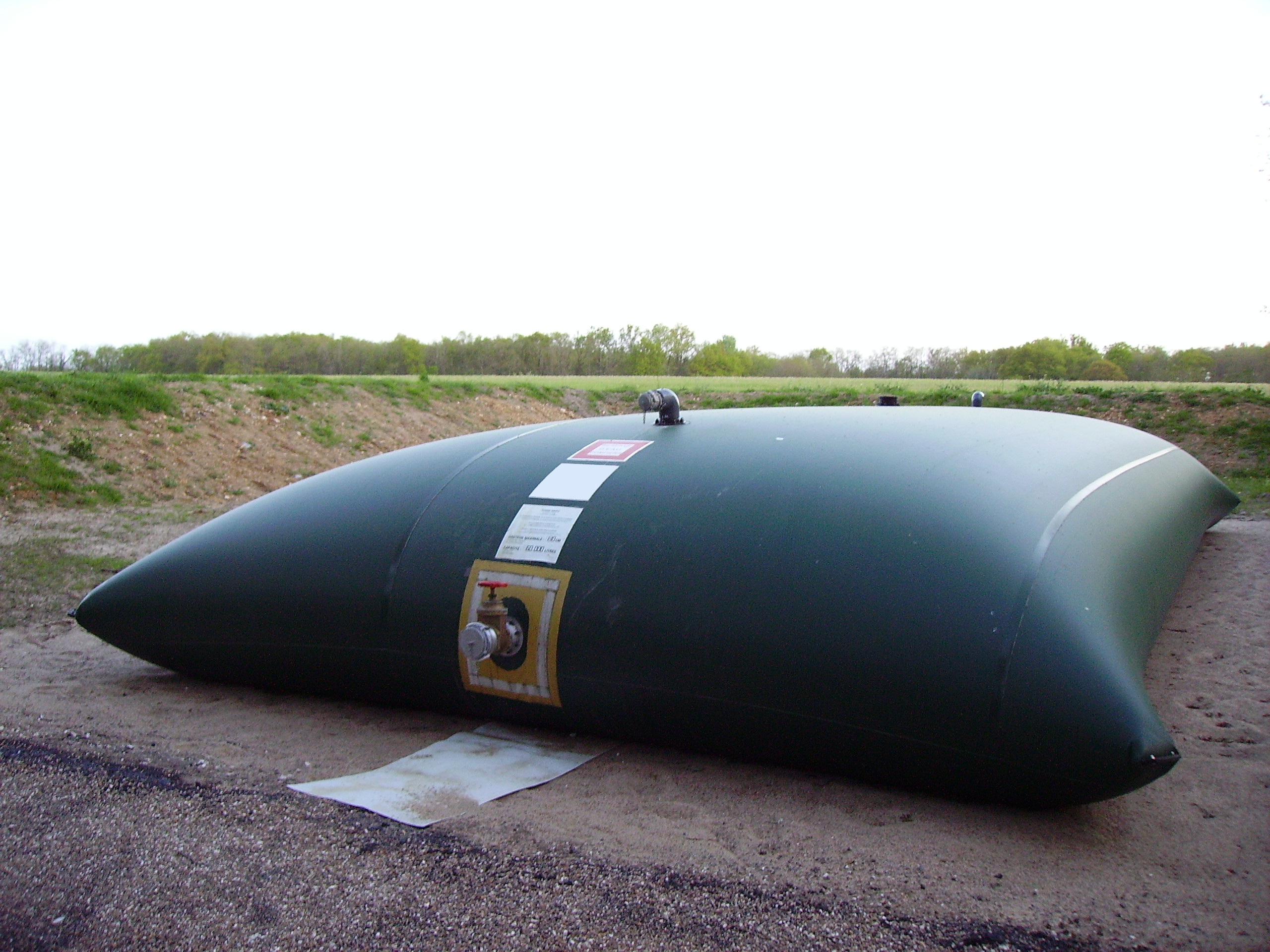
A portable flexible tank

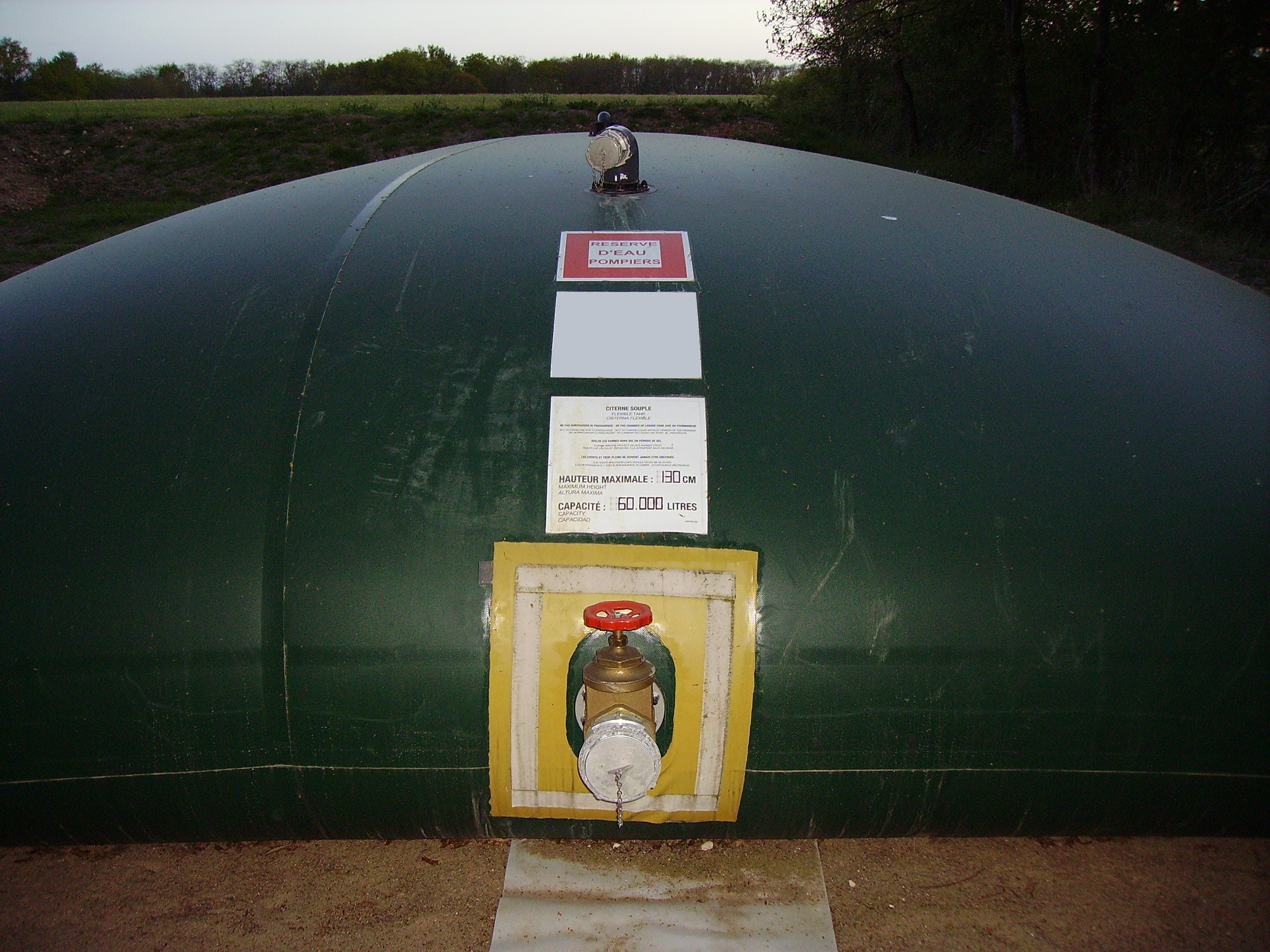
A 60,000-litre flexible tank

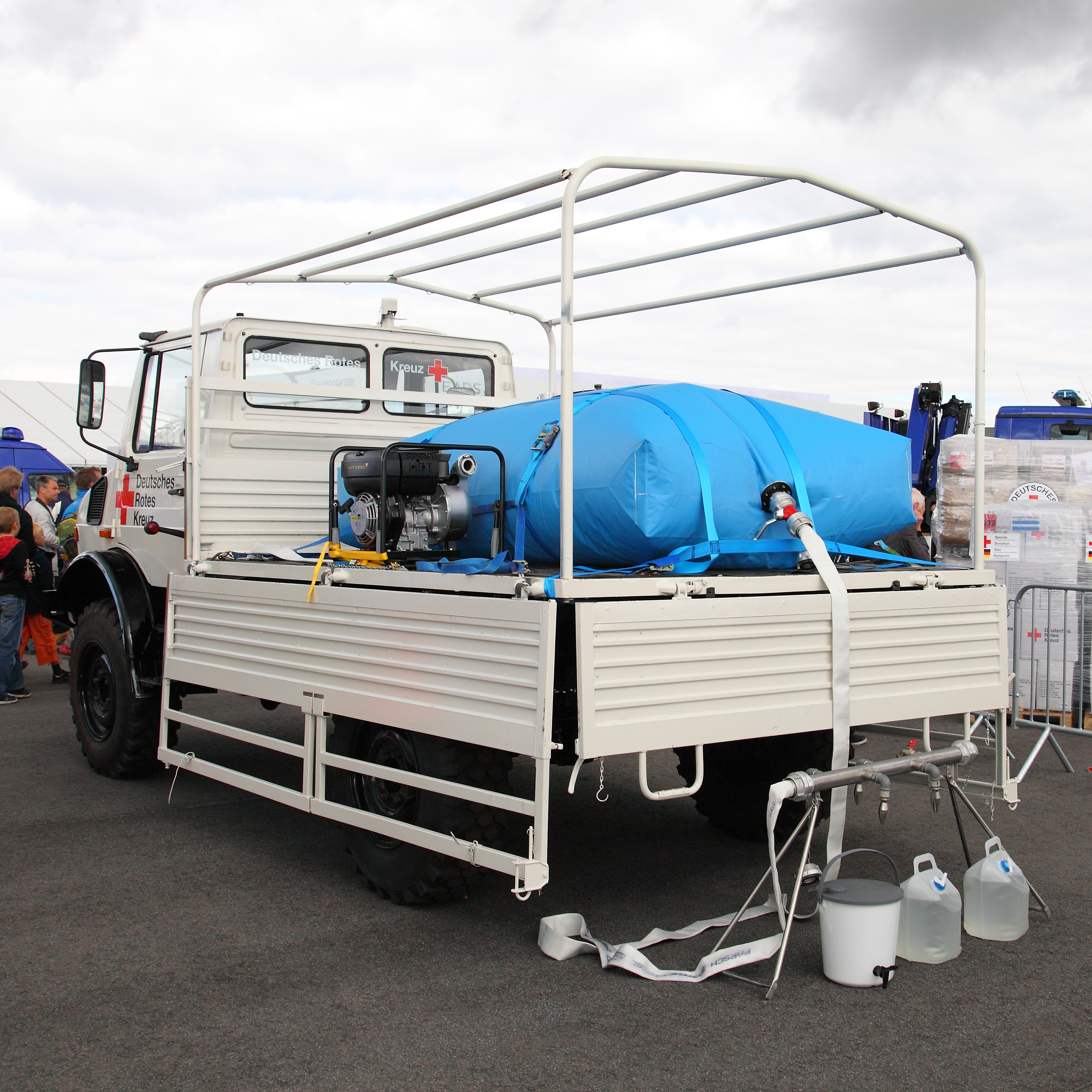
A flexible tank mounted on a light truck to provide drinking water

Flexible tanks (also flexi-bags, flexibags and flexi-tanks) are a kind of storage equipment for liquids such as water or oil. Compared to steel tanks, flexible tanks have many advantages, including lighter weight and being rustproof, foldable, and quicker and easier to set up. With the same capacity, an empty flexible tank may have just 10% of a steel tank's weight. The disadvantages of flexible tanks include lower durability and shorter longevity. Some flexible tanks can be used as transport containers on trucks, ships, or aeroplanes, with some suitable for use in airdrops, helicopter swing, or hauling water.

Flexible tanks can be made of high-tensile strength polyester fabric, with elastomer or plastomer (PU, PVC, nitrile) coated on both sides.

== History ==
Flexible tanks were first used in World War II aircraft including both fighters such as the Spitfire and bombers. Early manufacturers of flexible tanks included Marston Excelsior, who made fuel tanks for Vickers Wellington bombers and de Havilland Mosquito fighter-bombers in World War II.

Flexible tanks can be used to transport wine, juices, latex, oils and chemicals. Flexible tanks "made of fabric sandwiched between layers of rubber-like material" were advertised by ICI in 1959 as ways of carrying "all kinds of liquids from formaldehyde to fruit juice", and to "hold with equal safety anything from acids to drinking water." The advertisement compared modern flexible tanks to goatskins used to carry liquids by "our ancient forefathers".

The tanks used in F1 and rally cars and fighting vehicle fuel tanks are a kind of fabric reinforced thermoplastic or rubber Storage tank for liquids. These have greatly reduced deaths from fire among racing drivers. Rubber fuel tanks have been viable technology for cars since the late 1950s, but few manufacturers have adopted them.

In 1962, 10,000 gallon flexible tanks made of neoprene rubber were used to store fuel oil in Antarctica. Each tank weighed 750 pounds and could be folded up into a volume of 125 cubic feet. The tanks were laid directly on to the Antarctic permafrost.

== Water Storage ==
The water industry began using flexible membranes in the 1950s. Advantages over rigid storage systems include low cost, less algae growth, lower groundwater contamination, and less evaporation and seepage. Disadvantages include shorter life expectancy, greater susceptibility to damage, and more frequent maintenance requirements. Due to the structural limitations of flexible tanks, they tend to have a maximum recommended water storage capacity.

== Alternative to tank containers ==
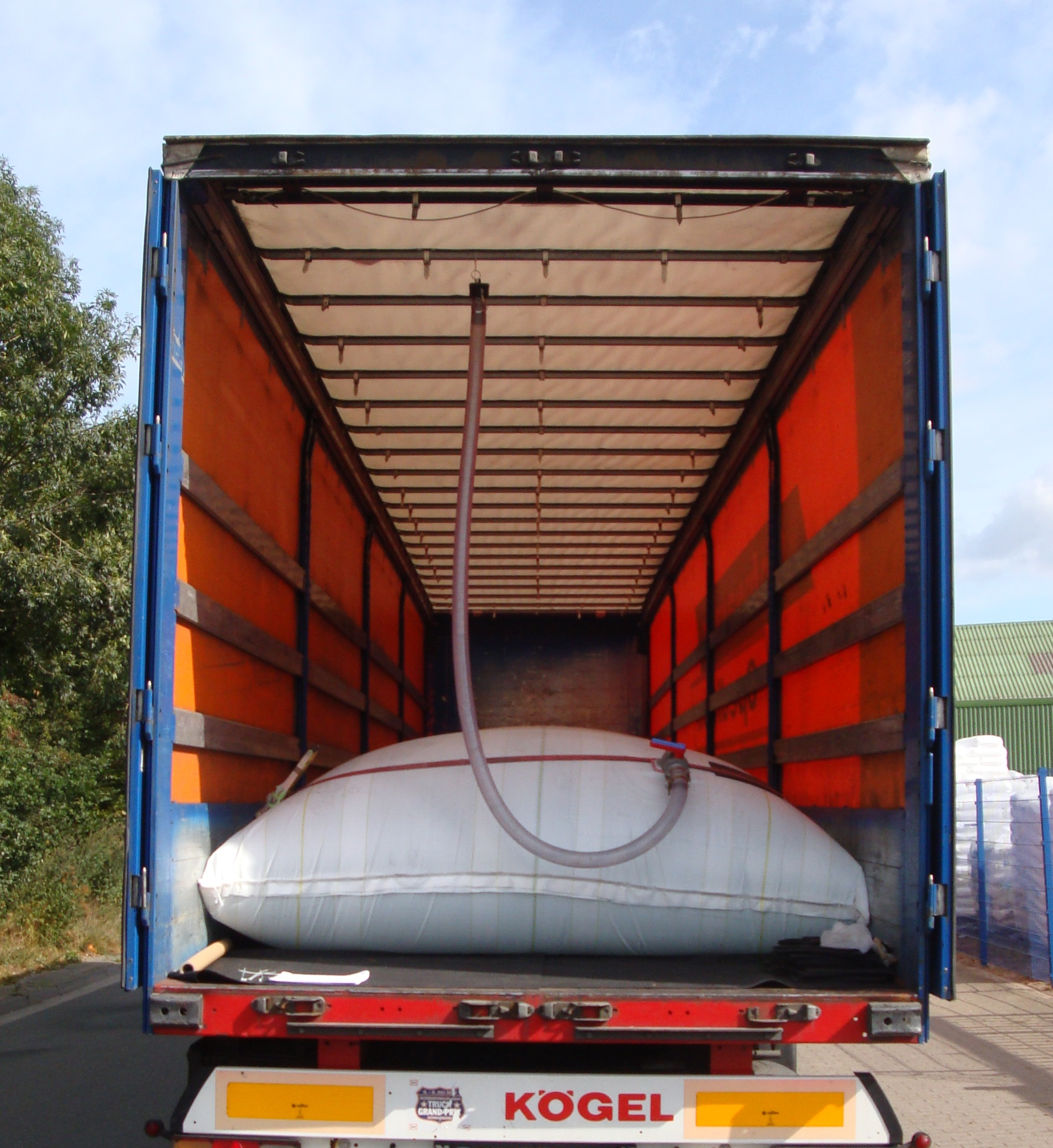
Flexi-bag in the back of a container

Flexi-bags offer an alternative to ISO tank containers for shipping oils, juices, wines, food-grade liquids and nonhazardous chemicals across the globe. Flexi-bags are usually loaded into 20′ food-grade, ISO containers for maritime or rail transport. Sizes range from 16,000 to 26,000 litres. For transport in the US, the materials used in the production of flexi-bags must meet the US Food and Drug Administration, EU food-grade or German BAG standards. The idea is to isolate the liquid being transported from ambient air to avoid oxidation.

They can also be used to transport a variety of other liquids such as base oils.

Depending on the product, many ISO tank container operators argue that flexi-bags can be more costly and less environmentally sound. This is generally the case for higher value products and/or environmentally dangerous products, because the transport protection offered by a flexi-bag is less, and the level of product that is left in the flexi-bag (2 to 5%) is higher than the amount left in a tank container.

== See also ==
- Bladder tank
- Flexible intermediate bulk container
- Fuel bladder
