= Bladder tank =

Flexible container used to store liquids

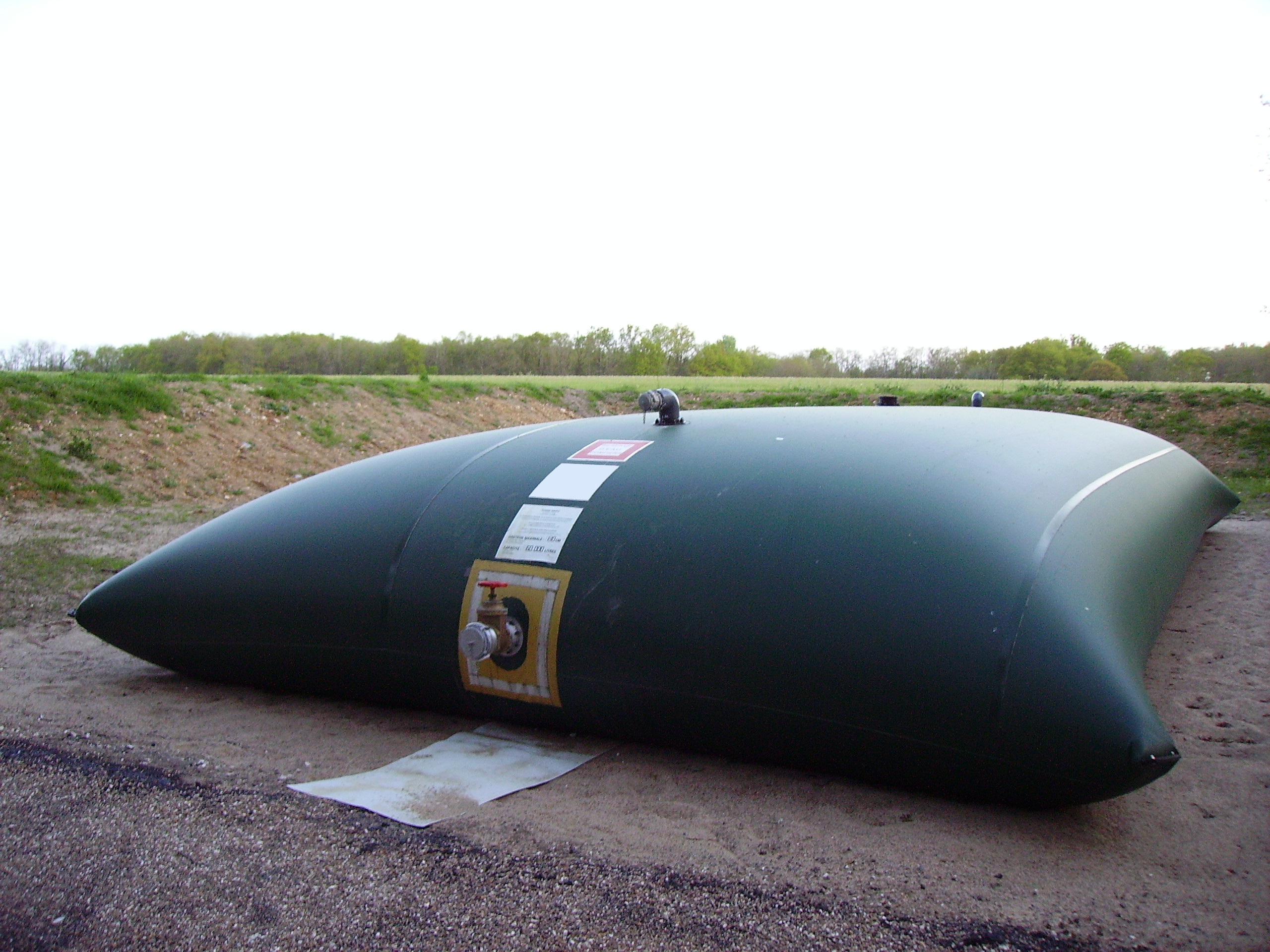
Bladder tank for fire protection

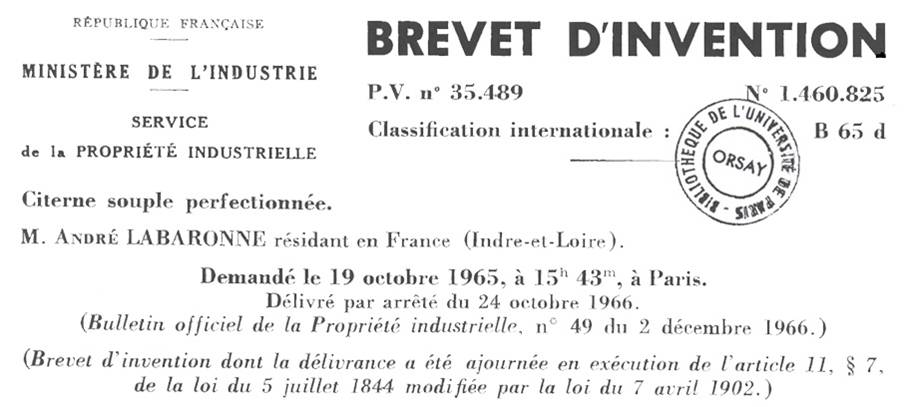
Labaronne's patent

A bladder tank is a large, flexible container used to store many types of liquids. When maximum capacity is reached, the bladder tank takes the form of a large pillow, hence it is also called a pillow tank.

== History ==
The first engineered flexible bladder tank was constructed from rubber in 1926 and manufactured by John Boyd Dunlop in Manchester UK, then later made from modern materials such polymers, and from PVC in Algeria, Africa in the 1950s. It was invented by André Labaronne (patent N°1.460.825, 19 October 1965) and marketed under the brand CITAF (Citernes pour l’agriculture Française).

The technology was popularized in the early 21st century, with many wines, for example, shipped by flexitank then bottled nearer a final point-of-sale.

== Description ==
Flexible bladder tanks are made from numerous materials depending on the chemical compatibility of its content. LLDPE, PVC, TPU and Nitrile rubber panels/sheets are all welded in different ways through; heat, High frequency and vulcanizing consequently. The panels/sheets are joined to form a sleeve which is then closed at each end to form a bladder tank. Materials selected for manufacturing bladder tanks in the first instant is for their Chemical compatibility of its content, secondly UV resistant if the application is for outside storage where UV plays a role and others are chosen for their mechanical abrasion resistance if used in transport on truck, trains or Aircraft. There are many applications for bladder tanks, static storage, transportable and ISO container tanks. Some examples of what can be stored or transported in the Bladder tanks are fossil fuels (hydrocarbon), liquid fertilizers, emulsions, rainwater, drinking and grey water.

For the use of static badder storage tanks, installation is fast and simple and requires a level, free of sharp objects like rocks, spikes or other materials that might damage the tanks. Ideally a layer of sand or a special ground sheet is often used to minimize surface irregularities. Static storage tanks when used for Fuels or other hazardous chemicals are usually placed with within a berm with a liner for secondary containment to prevent adverse environmental effects when bladder tanks leak or fail. For most non-hazardous applications ground cloths or sheets are used made from geotextile or PVC.

Bladder tanks were initially used for rapid deployment by DODs, UN, Ngos in the case of war or disaster and later for more long term applications in a wide range of industries such as farming, mining, manufacturing, marine and aviation. Bladder tanks have many capacities ranging from 500 liter up to 1 million liters. Liquid stored in a flexible bladder tank does not evaporate and any odor it may produce is completely sealed within the tank. Because the bladder tank works in a vacuum, contaminants cannot enter, what you put in is what you get out.

== See also ==
- Flexible tanks
- Fuel tank
- Fuel bladder
- Water tank
