= Fuel bladder =

Flexible bag used as a fuel container

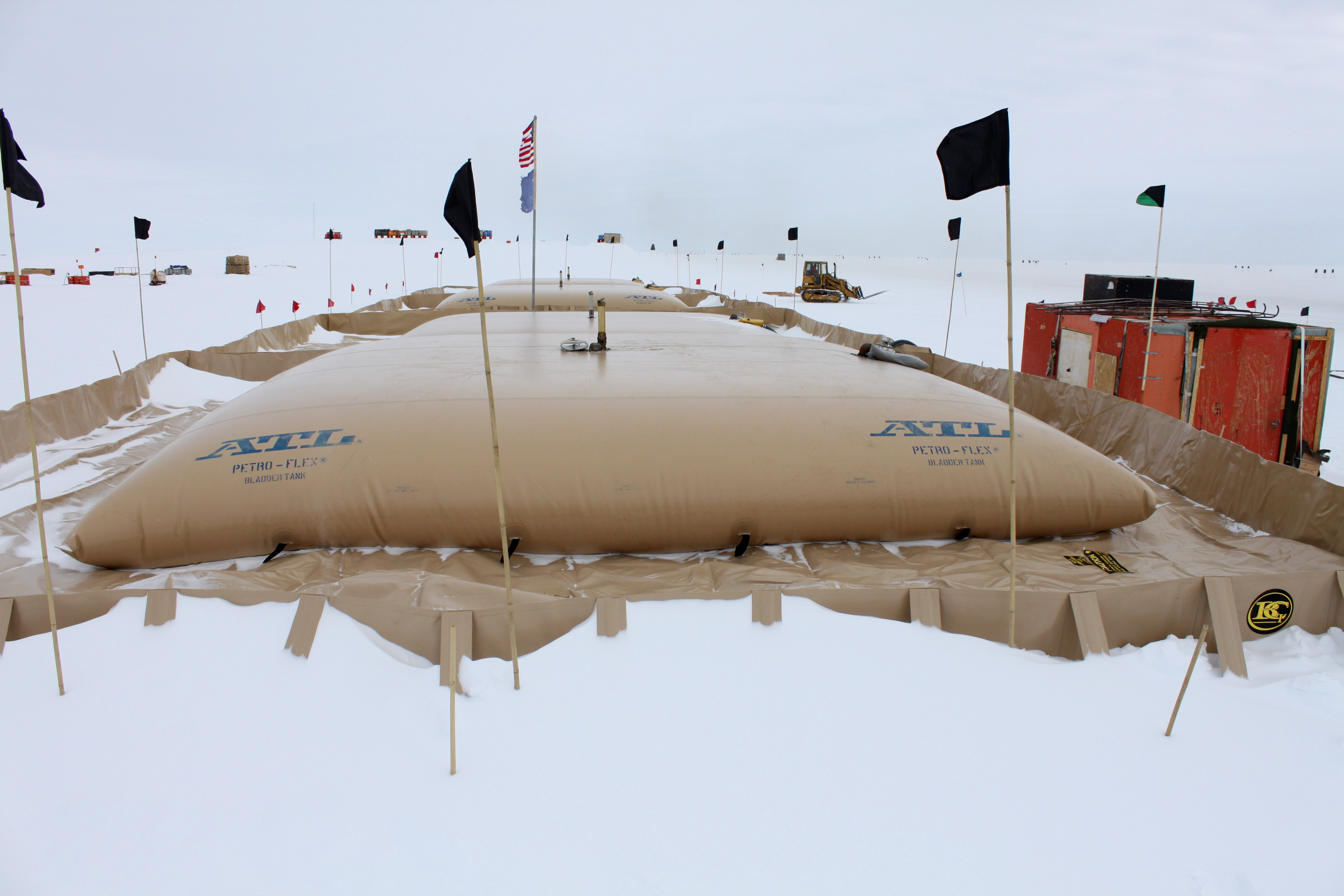
Fuel bladder at Byrd Field Camp in Antarctica

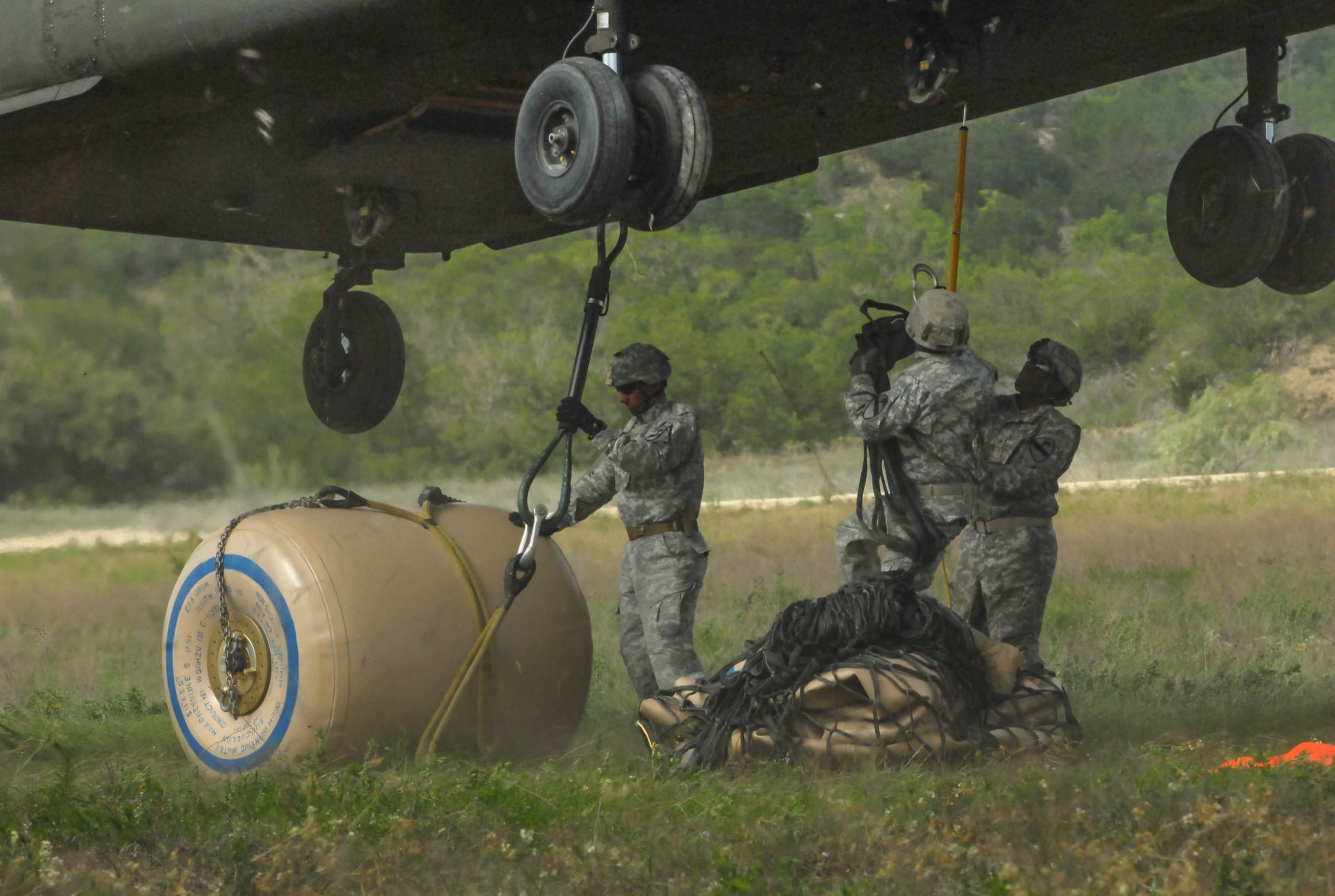
Portable 500 gallon fuel and water bladder known as a "blivet"

Fuel bladders or fuel storage bladders are a type of flexi-bag used as a fuel container. They are collapsible, flexible storage bladders (also known as tanks) that provide transport and storage (temporary or long term) for bulk industrial liquids such as fuels.

Standard fuel bladder tanks sizes range from 100-US-gallon (380 L) to 200,000-US-gallon (760,000 L) capacities and larger. Custom fuel storage bladders and cells are available, although at sizes exceeding 50,000 US gallons (190,000 L) there is an increased spill risk.

To minimize the risk of leakage, and for the sake of containing a catastrophic spill, all fuel bladders should be housed in secondary containment (bunding). The use of fuel bladders without precautionary measures is risky and should not be undertaken. The United States Environmental Protection Agency has set clear guidelines for the use of secondary containment concerning fuel bladders and imposes fines for discharging of fuel into the environment.

== Primary use ==
Fuel bladders are used in various fields, such as agribusiness, public works, humanitarian, military and industrial areas. Standard tanks are designed for land based use and operations, but can be used in marine settings and in aviation given proper support. Fuel bladders are also commonly used in oil spill recovery operations.

High end fuel bladders offer a high degree of protection of the stored liquids, ensuring the contents never come in contact with air. This ensures that there is no risk of evaporation or explosion due to gas formation. In order to prevent liquid contamination, a neutral barrier film is added to the fuel bladder's interior.

Fuel bladders are most useful in situations where critical infrastructure has been compromised or does not exist. The benefits of using a flexible storage system like fuel bladders include their ability to be transported and set up quickly. GMA Cover Corp. advertises that their pillow shaped bladders are foldable at less than 5% of the total volume. Fuel bladders have high resistance to climatic conditions, which makes them useful for use in disaster zones and wartime desert operations.

== Technical characteristics ==
High end fuel bladders are made of elastomer coated fabrics usually manufactured by homogeneous vulcanization in one operation. The fabrics ensure mechanical strength needed for shipment and storage. The coatings and design engineering provide compatibility with the intended contents (fuel).

Fuels are often classified as dangerous goods and thus have strict regulations for container construction, field performance, and markings.

== Transportation ==
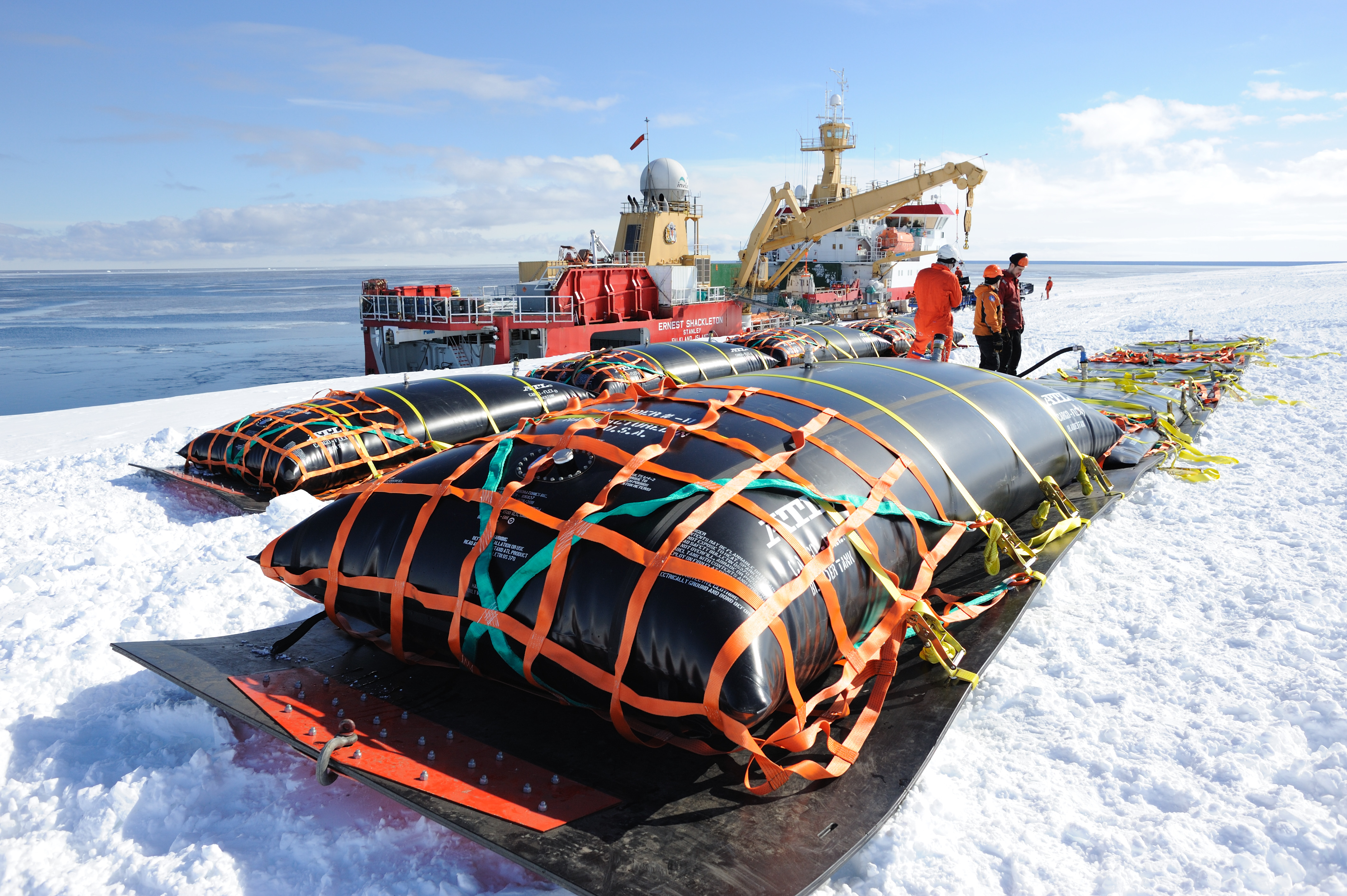
Liquid transport fuel bladders being filled in Antarctica

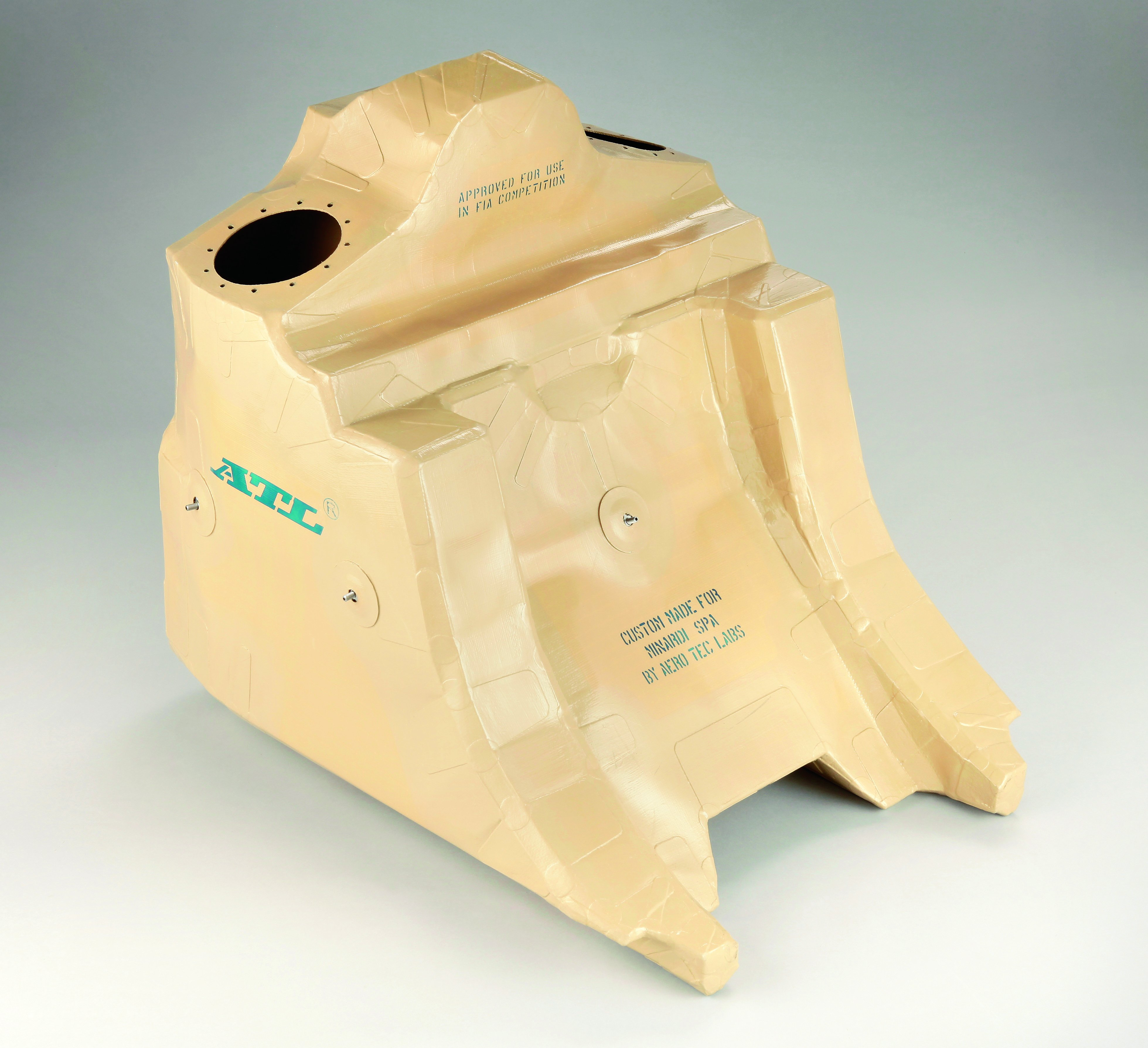
Typical Formula One "crash-worthy" fuel bladder

Fuel bladders can come equipped with all the necessary components for transportation; for example, water transportation or fuel transportation on vehicles. Flexible tanks are equipped with adjustable skirts and adjustable towage straps designed to provide high resistance to transport constraints. Adjustable skirts may be replaced by a strap net in case the users need to transform a traditional storage tank to a transportable flexible tank. Specially developed flexible fuel bladders can also be towed by sled, as in the unique Antarctic expeditions made by American, German and British science teams.

== Additional uses ==
Pillow shaped tanks can be designed for non-fuel bulk liquid transport, industrial chemicals, potable water, sludge, and fuel storage. They are also used as "water bladders". The synthetic fabrics used are tough and strong to avoid damage and to prevent leakage.

Ultra-tough "crash-worthy" fuel bladders, reinforced with such fibers as Kevlar, are popular in the motorsports industry and are considered a critical safety component, mandated by racing's top series such as Formula 1 and NASCAR. The development of the flexible crash-worthy fuel bladder has significantly reduced the number of fires, and subsequent explosions, often experienced in a violent auto racing crashes. The same crash-worthy technology can also be found in military/industrial vehicles, combatant craft and aircraft.

== See also ==
- Bladder tank
- Ferry tank
- Flexible tank
- Fuel container
- Self-sealing fuel tank
